= Robert Award for Best Danish Film =

Danish film award

The Robert Award for Best Danish Film (Danish: Robert Prisen for årets danske spillefilm) is presented at an annual Robert Award ceremony by the Danish Film Academy

== Honorees ==
=== 1980s ===
- 1984: Beauty and the Beast (Skønheden og udyret) directed by Nils Malmros
- 1985: The Element of Crime (Forbrydelsens element) directed by Lars von Trier
- 1986: The Flying Devils (De flyvende djævle) directed by Anders Refn
- 1987: Cœurs flambés (Flamberede hjerter) directed by Helle Ryslinge
- 1988: Pelle the Conqueror (Pelle Erobreren) directed by Bille August
- 1989: Emma's Shadow (Skyggen af Emma) directed by Søren Kragh-Jacobsen

=== 1990s ===
- 1990: Waltzing Regitze (Dansen med Regitze) directed by Kaspar Rostrup
- 1991: Dance of the Polar Bears (Lad isbjørnene danse) directed by Birger Larsen
- 1992: Europa directed by Lars von Trier
- 1993: Pain of Love (Kærlighedens smerte) directed by Nils Malmros
- 1994: The House of the Spirits (Åndernes hus) directed by Bille August
- 1995: Nightwatch (Nattevagten) directed by Ole Bornedal
- 1996: The Beast Within (Menneskedyret) directed by Carsten Rudolf
- 1997: Breaking the Waves directed by Lars von Trier
- 1998: Barbara directed by Nils Malmros & Let's get lost directed by Jonas Elmer
- 1999: The Celebration (Festen) directed by Thomas Vinterberg

=== 2000s ===
- 2000: The One and Only (Den eneste ene) directed by Susanne Bier
- 2001: The Bench (Bænken) directed by Per Fly
  - Help! I'm a Fish (Hjælp, jeg er en fisk) directed by Stefan Fjeldmark, Greg Manwaring, and Michael Hegner (uncredited)
- 2002: Kira's Reason: A Love Story (En kærlighedshistorie) directed by Ole Christian Madsen
  - Mona's World (Monas verden) directed by Jonas Elmer
  - One-Hand Clapping (At klappe med én hånd) directed by Gert Fredholm
  - Shake It All About (En kort en lang) directed by Hella Joof
  - The King Is Alive directed by Kristian Levring
- 2003: Open Hearts (Elsker dig for evigt) directed by Susanne Bier
  - I Am Dina (Jeg er Dina) directed by Ole Bornedal
  - Okay directed by Jesper W. Nielsen
  - Facing the Truth (At kende sandheden) directed by Nils Malmros
  - Wilbur Wants to Kill Himself (Wilbur begår selvmord) directed by Lone Scherfig
- 2004: The Inheritance (Arven) directed by Per Fly
  - Dogville directed by Lars von Trier
  - Move Me (Lykkevej) directed by Morten Arnfred
  - Stealing Rembrandt (Rembrandt) directed by Jannik Johansen
  - Reconstruction directed by Christoffer Boe
- 2005: King's Game (Kongekabale) directed by Nikolaj Arcel
  - Aftermath (Lad de små børn) directed by Paprika Steen
  - Day and night directed by Simon Staho
  - In Your Hands (Forbrydelser) directed by Annette K. Olesen
  - Pusher II directed by Nicolas Winding Refn
- 2006: Adam's Apples (Adams æbler) directed by Anders Thomas Jensen
  - Dark Horse (Voksne mennesker) directed by Dagur Kári
  - Flies on the Wall (Fluerne på væggen) directed by Åke Sandgren
  - Manderlay (Manderlay) directed by Lars von Trier
  - Manslaughter (Drabet) directed by Per Fly
- 2007: We Shall Overcome (Drømmen) directed by Niels Arden Oplev
  - A Soap (En soap) directed by Pernille Fischer Christensen
  - After the Wedding (Efter brylluppet) directed by Susanne Bier
  - Offscreen directed by Christoffer Boe
  - Prague (Prag) directed by Ole Christian Madsen
  - Princess directed by Anders Morgenthaler
- 2008: The Art of Crying (Kunsten at græde i kor) directed by Peter Schønau Fog
  - Daisy Diamond directed by Simon Staho
  - Echo (Ekko) directed by Anders Morgenthaler
  - Just Another Love Story (Kærlighed på film) directed by Ole Bornedal
  - White Night (Hvid nat) directed by Jannik Johansen
- 2009: Terribly Happy (Frygtelig lykkelig) directed by Henrik Ruben Genz
  - Fear Me Not (Den du frygter) directed by Kristian Levring
  - Flame & Citron (Flammen & Citronen) directed by Ole Christian Madsen
  - Little Soldier (Lille soldat) directed by Annette K. Olesen
  - Worlds Apart (To verdener) directed by Niels Arden Oplev

=== 2010s ===
- 2010: Antichrist directed by Lars von Trier
  - Aching Hearts (Kærestesorger) directed by Nils Malmros
  - Applause (Applaus) directed by Martin Zandvliet
  - Deliver Us from Evil (Fri os fra det onde) directed by Ole Bornedal
  - Old Boys directed by Nikolaj Steen
- 2011: R directed by Tobias Lindholm and Michael Noer
  - Brotherhood (Broderskab) directed by Nicolo Donato
  - Everything Will Be Fine (Alting bliver godt igen) directed by Christoffer Boe
  - Submarino directed by Thomas Vinterberg
  - Truth About Men (Sandheden om mænd) directed by Nikolaj Arcel
- 2012: Melancholia directed by Lars von Trier
  - A Family (En familie) directed by Pernille Fischer Christensen
  - A Funny Man (Dirch) directed by Martin Zandvliet
  - Rosa Morena directed by Carlos Augusto de Oliveira
  - SuperClásico directed by Ole Christian Madsen
- 2013: A Hijacking (Kapringen) directed by Tobias Lindholm
  - Teddy Bear (10 timer til paradis) directed by Mads Matthiesen
  - Love Is All You Need (Den skaldede frisør ) directed by Susanne Bier
  - A Royal Affair (En kongelig affære) directed by Nikolaj Arcel
  - Undskyld jeg forstyrrer (Undskyld jeg forstyrrer) directed by Henrik Ruben Genz
- 2014: The Hunt (Jagten) directed by Thomas Vinterberg
  - Department Q: The Keeper of Lost Causes (Kvinden i buret) directed by Mikkel Nørgaard
  - Nordvest directed by Michael Noer
  - Sorrow and Joy (Sorg og glæde) directed by Nils Malmros
  - Spies & Glistrup directed by Christoffer Boe
- 2015: Nymphomaniac Director's Cut directed by Lars Von Trier
  - Department Q: The Absent One (Fasandræberne) directed by Mikkel Nørgaard
  - Speed Walking (Kapgang) directed by Niels Arden Oplev
  - Klumpfisken directed by Søren Balle
  - Silent Heart (Stille hjerte) directed by Bille August
- 2016: Land of Mine (Under Sandet) directed by Martin Zandvliet
  - The Idealist (Idealisten) directed by Christina Rosendahl
  - A War (Krigen) directed by Tobias Lindholm
  - Men & Chicken (Mænd og høns) directed by Anders Thomas Jensen
  - Sommeren '92 directed by Kasper Barfoed
- 2017: The Day Will Come (Der kommer en dag) directed by Jesper W. Nielsen
  - Parents (Forældre) directed by Christian Tafdrup
  - In the Blood (I blodet) directed by Rasmus Heisterberg
  - The Commune (Kollektivet) directed by Thomas Vinterberg
  - The Neon Demon (The Neon Demon) directed by Nicolas Winding Refn
- 2018: Winter Brothers (Vinterbrødre) directed by Hlynur Pálmason
  - The Incredible Story of the Giant Pear (Den utrolige historie om den kæmpestore pære) directed by Amalie Næsby Fick, Jørgen Lerdam, and Philip Einstein Lipski
  - A Terrible Woman (En frygtelig kvinde) directed by Christian Tafdrup
  - Mens vi lever directed by Mehdi Avaz
  - Darkland (Underverden) directed by Fenar Ahmad
- 2019: The Guilty (Den skyldige) directed by Gustav Möller
  - A Fortunate Man (Lykke-Per) directed by Bille August
  - The House That Jack Built directed by Lars von Trier
  - Ditte & Louise directed by Niclas Bendixen
  - The Purity of Vengeance (Journal 64) directed by Mikkel Nørgaard

=== 2020s ===
- 2020: Queen of Hearts (Dronningen) directed by May el-Toukhy
  - Before the Frost (Før frosten) directed by Michael Noer
  - Daniel (Ser du månen, Daniel) directed by Niels Arden Oplev
  - Uncle (Onkel) directed by René Frelle Petersen
  - Sons of Denmark (Danmarks sønner) directed by Ulaa Salim
- 2021: Another Round (Druk) directed by Thomas Vinterberg
  - A Perfectly Normal Family (En helt almindelig familie) directed by Malou Reymann
  - Riders of Justice (Retfærdighedens ryttere) directed by Anders Thomas Jensen
  - Shorta directed by Anders Ølholm and Frederik Louis Hviid
  - The Good Traitor (Vores mand i Amerika) directed by Christina Rosendahl
- 2022: Persona Non Grata – Producer: Daniel Mühlendorph; Director: Lisa Jespersen; Screenplay: Lisa Jespersen and Sara Isabella Jønsson‡
  - Margrete: Queen of the North – Producers: Birgitte Skov and Lars Bredo Rahbek; Director: Charlotte Sieling; Screenplay: Jesper Fink, Maya Ilsøe and Charlotte Sieling
  - The Pact – Producers: Jesper Morthorst and Karin Trolle; Director: Bille August; Screenplay: Christian Torpe
  - The Shadow in My Eye – Producers: Jonas Allen and Peter Bose; Director and Screenplay: Ole Bornedal
  - The Venus Effect – Producers: Rikke Sasja Lassen and Lise Orheim Stender; Director and Screenplay: Anna Emma Haudal
- 2023: Holy Spider – Director: Ali Abbasi‡
  - As in Heaven – Director: Tea Lindeburg
  - Chrysanthemum – Director: Christian Bengtson
  - Godland – Director: Hlynur Pálmason
  - Rose – Director: Niels Arden Oplev
  - Speak No Evil – Director: Christian Tafdrup
- 2024: The Promised Land – Director: Nikolaj Arcel‡
  - Empire – Director: Frederikke Aspöck
  - The Great Silence – Director: Katrine Brocks
  - Tove's Room – Director: Martin Zandvliet
  - Unruly – Director: Malou Reymann

== Filmmakers with multiple wins (3 or more) ==
- Lars von Trier - 6
- Thomas Vinterberg - 3
- Nils Malmros - 3

== See also ==
- Bodil Award for Best Danish Film
- Dogme 95
