= Robert Award for Best Actor in a Leading Role =

Danish film award

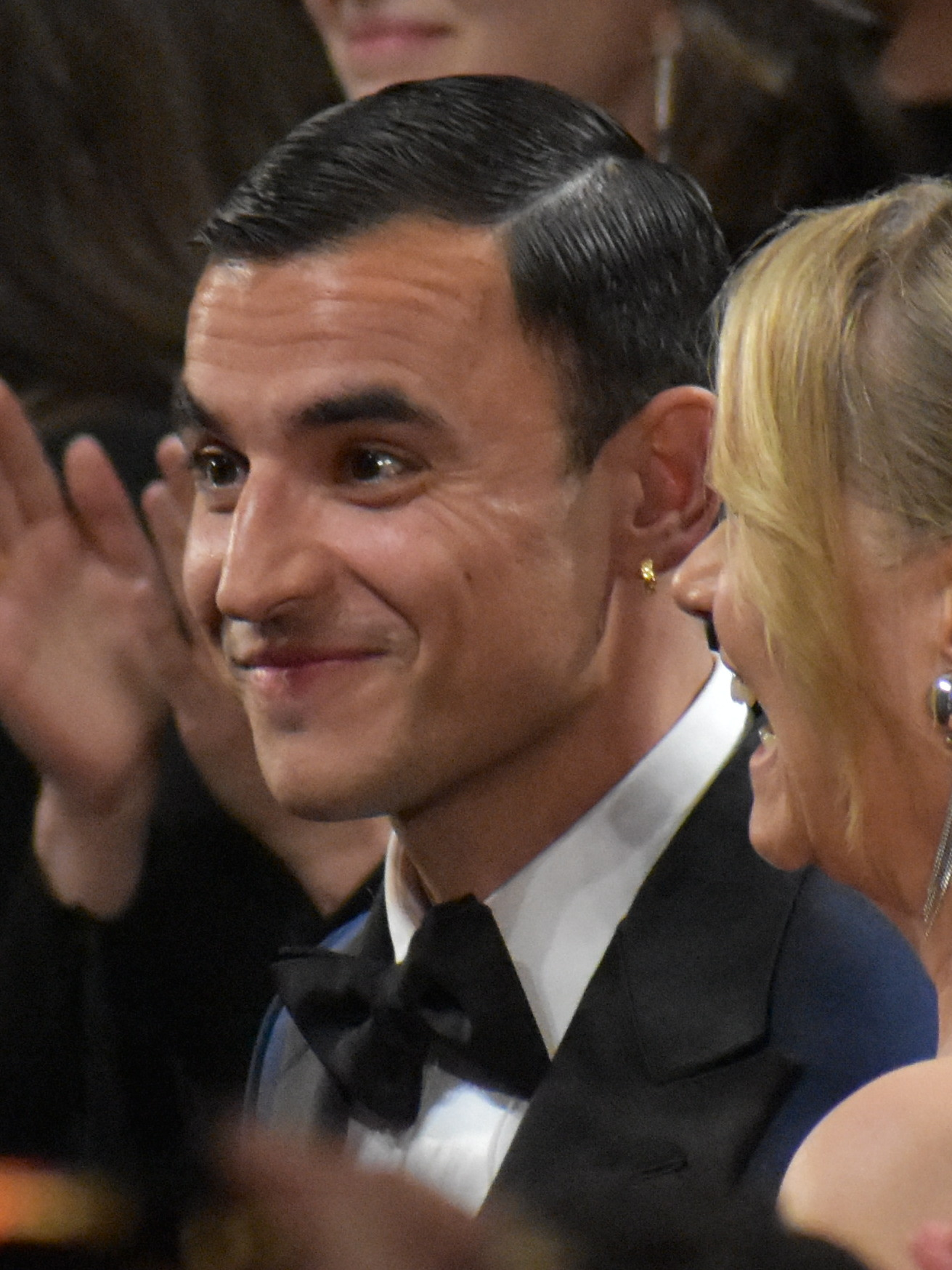
- The 2026 recipient: Besir Zeciri
- Awarded for: Best Performance by an Actor in a Leading Role
- Country: Denmark
- Presented by: Danish Film Academy
- First award: 1984
- Currently held by: Besir Zeciri for The Girl with the Needle (2026)
- Website: robertprisen.dk

The Robert Award for Best Actor in a Leading Role (Danish: Robert Prisen for årets mandlige hovedrolle) is presented at the annual Robert Awards ceremony by the Danish Film Academy to recognize an actor who has delivered an outstanding leading performance in a Danish film.

Danish actor Mads Mikkelsen holds the record for the most wins in this category, with four, for his performances in Pusher II (2004), The Hunt (2012), Another Round (2020) and The Promised Land (2023).

== Winners and nominees ==
=== 1980s ===
- 1984: Jesper Klein for Beauty and the Beast
- 1985: Lars Simonsen for Twist and Shout
- 1986: Reine Brynolfsson for Ofelia Comes to Town
- 1987: Torben Jensen for Coeurs flambés
- 1988: Max von Sydow for Pelle the Conqueror
- 1989: Börje Ahlstedt for Emma's Shadow

=== 1990s ===
- 1990: Frits Helmuth for Waltzing Regitze
- 1991: Tommy Kenter for Dance of the Polar Bears
- 1992: Ole Lemmeke for The Naked Trees
- 1993: Søren Østergaard for Pain of Love
- 1994: Frits Helmuth for Stolen Spring
- 1995: Ernst-Hugo Järegård for The Kingdom
- 1996: Ulf Pilgaard for Farligt venskab
- 1997: Thomas Bo Larsen for The Biggest Heroes
- 1998: Lars Simonsen for Barbara
- 1999: Ulrich Thomsen for The Celebration

=== 2000s ===
- 2000: Niels Olsen for The One and Only
- 2001: Jesper Christensen for The Bench
  - Anders W. Berthelsen nominated for Italian for Beginners
  - Søren Pilmark nominated for Flickering Lights
  - Thure Lindhardt nominated for A Place Nearby
  - Bjarne Henriksen nominated for Fruen på Hamre
- 2002: Nikolaj Lie Kaas for Truly Human
  - Martin Buch nominated for Chop Chop
  - Lars Mikkelsen nominated for Kira's Reason: A Love Story
  - Mads Mikkelsen nominated for Shake It All About
  - Jens Okking nominated for One-Hand Clapping
- 2003: Jens Albinus for Facing the Truth
  - Kim Bodnia nominated for Old Men in New Cars
  - Jørgen Kiil nominated for Minor Mishaps
  - Troels Lyby nominated for Okay
  - Mads Mikkelsen nominated for Open Hearts
- 2004: Ulrich Thomsen for The Inheritance
  - Lars Brygmann nominated for Stealing Rembrandt
  - Nikolaj Coster-Waldau nominated for The Bouncer
  - Frederik Christian Johansen nominated for Someone Like Hodder
  - Nikolaj Lie Kaas nominated for The Green Butchers
- 2005: Mads Mikkelsen for Pusher II
  - Mikael Birkkjær nominated for Aftermath
  - Frits Helmuth nominated for Villa Paranoia
  - Mikael Persbrandt nominated for Day and Night
  - Ulrich Thomsen nominated for Brothers
- 2006: Troels Lyby for Accused
  - Jesper Christensen nominated for Manslaughter
  - Bjarne Henriksen nominated for Kinamand
  - Nikolaj Lie Kaas nominated for Murk
  - Ulrich Thomsen nominated for Adam's Apples
- 2007: David Dencik for A Soap
  - Jens Albinus nominated for The Boss of It All
  - Nicolas Bro nominated for Offscreen
  - Mads Mikkelsen nominated for After the Wedding
  - Mads Mikkelsen nominated for Prague
- 2008: Lars Brygmann for White Night
  - Anders W. Berthelsen nominated for Just Another Love Story
  - Kim Bodnia nominated for Echo
  - David Dencik nominated for Outside Love
  - Søren Pilmark nominated for How to Get Rid of the Others
- 2009: Jakob Cedergren for Terribly Happy
  - Anders W. Berthelsen nominated for What No One Knows
  - Carsten Bjørnlund nominated for Oneway-ticket to Korsør
  - Thure Lindhardt nominated for Flame & Citron
  - Ulrich Thomsen nominated for Fear Me Not

=== 2010s ===
- 2010: Lars Mikkelsen for Headhunter
  - Willem Dafoe nominated for Antichrist
  - Thomas Ernst nominated for Aching Hearts
  - Kristian Halken nominated for Oldboys
  - Cyron Melville nominated for Love and Rage
- 2011: Pilou Asbæk for R
  - Jens Albinus nominated for Everything Will Be Fine
  - Jakob Cedergren nominated for Submarino
  - Mads Mikkelsen nominated for Valhalla Rising
  - Mikael Persbrandt nominated for In a Better World
- 2012: Nikolaj Lie Kaas for A Funny Man
  - Anders W. Berthelsen nominated for Rosa Morena
  - Anders W. Berthelsen nominated for SuperClásico
  - Nicolas Bro nominated for Beast
  - Nikolaj Lie Kaas nominated for A Family
- 2013: Søren Malling for A Hijacking
- 2014: Mads Mikkelsen for The Hunt
- 2015: Henrik Birch for Klumpfisken
- 2016: Ulrich Thomsen for Sommeren '92
  - Mads Mikkelsen nominated for Men & Chicken
  - Peter Plaugborg nominated for The Idealist
  - Pilou Asbæk nominated for A War
  - Roland Møller nominated for Land of Mine
- 2017: Søren Malling for Parents
- 2018: Elliott Crosset Hove for Winter Brothers
- 2019: Jakob Cedergren for The Guilty

=== 2020s ===
Year	Actor	Film	Original title	Ref.
2020 (37th)	Esben Smed	Daniel	Ser du månen, Daniel	
2020 (37th)	Dar Salim	Until We Fall	Til vi falder	
2020 (37th)	Gustav Lindh	Queen of Hearts	Dronningen	
2020 (37th)	Jesper Christensen	Before the Frost	Før frosten	
2020 (37th)	Zaki Youssef	Sons of Denmark	Danmarks sønner	
2021 (38th)	Mads Mikkelsen	Another Round	Druk	
2021 (38th)	Mads Mikkelsen	Riders of Justice	Retfærdighedens Ryttere	
2021 (38th)	Nikolaj Lie Kaas	Riders of Justice	Retfærdighedens Ryttere	
2021 (38th)	Mikkel Boe Følsgaard	A Perfectly Normal Family	En helt almindelig familie	
2021 (38th)	Jacob Ulrik Lohmann	Enforcement	Shorta	
2022 (39th)	Simon Bennebjerg	The Pact	Pagten	
2022 (39th)	Anders Matthesen	Checkered Ninja 2	Ternet Ninja 2	
2022 (39th)	Joachim Fjeldstrup	The Blue Orchid	Den blå orkidé	
2022 (39th)	Nikolaj Coster-Waldau	A Taste of Hunger	Smagen af sult	
2022 (39th)	Søren Malling	Margrete: Queen of the North	Margrete den Første	
2023 (40th)	Anders W. Berthelsen	A Lucky Man	Stastny clovek	
2023 (40th)	Elliott Crosset Hove	Godland	Volaða land	
2023 (40th)	Mehdi Bajestani	Holy Spider	عنکبوت مقدس	
2023 (40th)	Morten Burian	Speak No Evil	Gæsterne	
2023 (40th)	Morten Hee Andersen	Krysantemum		
2023 (40th)	Ole Sørensen	Forever	Resten af livet	
2024 (41st)	Mads Mikkelsen	The Promised Land	Bastarden	
2024 (41st)	Lars Brygmann	Tove's Room	Toves værelse	
2024 (41st)	Sylvester Byder	Unsinkable	Synkefri	
2024 (41st)	Nicolai Jørgensen	Viktor vs the World	Viktor mod verden	
2024 (41st)	Dar Salim	Darkland: The Return	Underverden II	
2025 (42nd)	Lars Ranthe	Matters of the Heart	Fuld af kærlighed	
2025 (42nd)	Sebastian Bull	Sons	Vogter	
2025 (42nd)	Gustav Giese	The Quiet Ones	De lydløse	
2025 (42nd)	Kristian Halken	When in Rome	Rom	
2025 (42nd)	Nikolaj Lie Kaas	Way Home	Vejen hjem	
2026 (43rd)	Besir Zeciri	The Girl with the Needle	Pigen med nålen	
2026 (43rd)	Magnus Juhl Andersen	Sauna		
2026 (43rd)	Nina Rask	Sauna		
2026 (43rd)	Nikolaj Lie Kaas	The Last Viking	Den sidste viking	
2026 (43rd)	Mads Mikkelsen	The Last Viking	Den sidste viking	

== See also ==
- Bodil Award for Best Actor in a Leading Role
