= 41st Robert Awards =

2024 Danish film awards ceremony

- Date: 3 February 2024
- Hosted by: Lise Baastrup
- Organized by: Danish Film Academy

Highlights
- Best Film: The Promised Land
- Most awards: Film; The Promised Land (8); Television; Prisoner (5)
- Most nominations: Film; The Promised Land (14); Television; Carmen Curlers 2, Chorus Girls, and Prisoner (6)

The 41st Robert Awards ceremony, presented by Danish Film Academy on 3 February 2024, to honour the best in Danish film and television of 2023. It took place at the Tivoli Hotel & Congress Centre in Copenhagen, Denmark and was hosted by actress Lise Baastrup.

Epic historical drama The Promised Land won eight awards out of fourteen nominations, including Best Danish Film. Documentary film Apolonia, Apolonia won all five awards out of its nominations. Other winners included Unruly with two. DR1's crime drama series Prisoner won five awards, including Best Danish Television Series and every acting category. Film producer Marianne Moritzen received this year's Robert Honorary Award. Film producer Sara Stockmann received the Ib Award.

== Winners and nominees ==
The nominations were announced on 9 January 2024. Winners are listed first, highlighted in boldface, and indicated with a double dagger (‡).

=== Film ===
**Best Danish Film**: **The Promised Land – Louise Vesth, Nikolaj Arcel, and Anders Thomas Jensen**‡; Empire – Nina Leidersdorff, Frederikke Aspöck, and Anna Neye; The Great Silence – Pernille Tornøe, Katrine Brocks, and Marianne Lentz; Tove's Room – Mikael Rieks, Martin Zandvliet, and Jakob Weis; Unruly – Matilda Appelin, Malou Reymann, and Sara Isabella Jønsson	**Best Children and Youth Film**: **The Great Glitch / Children of Paradise – Magnus Nygaard Albertsen and Søren Peter Langkjær Bojsen**‡; Rosa and the Stone Troll – Marie Bro, Karla Nor Holmbäck, and Toke Westmark Steensen; Shabholm – Daniel Mühlendorph, Gigis, Christoffer Krustrup, Sorena Sanjari, and Troels Unneland
**Best Director**: **Lea Glob – Apolonia, Apolonia**‡; Katrine Brocks – The Great Silence; Malou Reymann – Unruly; Martin Zandvliet – Tove's Room; Nikolaj Arcel – The Promised Land; Søren Peter Langkjær Bojsen – The Great Glitch / Children of Paradise
**Best Original Screenplay**: **Unruly – Malou Reymann and Sara Isabella Jønsson**‡; Empire – Anna Neye; The Great Silence – Katrine Brocks and Marianne Lentz; The Quiet Migration – Malene Choi and Sissel Dalsgaard Thomsen; Unsinkable – Christian Andersen and Martin Strange-Hansen	**Best Adapted Screenplay**: **The Promised Land – Anders Thomas Jensen and Nikolaj Arcel**‡; Copenhagen Does Not Exist – Eskil Vogt; Hygge! – Dagur Kári and Mads Tafdrup; The Land of Short Sentences – Ida Maria Rydén and Jenny Lund Madsen; Tove's Room – Jakob Weis
**Best Actor in a Leading Role**: **Mads Mikkelsen – The Promised Land as Ludwig Kahlen**‡; Lars Brygmann – Tove's Room as Victor Andreasen; Sylvester Byder – Unsinkable as Henrik; Nicolai Jørgensen – Viktor vs the World as Viktor; Dar Salim – Darkland: The Return as Zaid	**Best Actress in a Leading Role**: **Paprika Steen – Tove's Room as Tove Ditlevsen**‡; Amanda Collin – The Promised Land as Ann Barbara; Emilie Kroyer Koppel – Unruly as Maren; Anna Neye – Empire as Anna; Sofie Torp – The Land of Short Sentences as Marie
**Best Actor in a Supporting Role**: **Simon Bennebjerg – The Promised Land as Frederik de Schinkel**‡; Joachim Fjelstrup – Tove's Room as Klaus Rifbjerg; Anders Heinrichsen – Unruly as Overlæge Wildenskov; Elliott Crosset Hove – The Great Silence as Erik; Thomas Hwan – The Land of Short Sentences as Rasmus	**Best Actress in a Supporting Role**: **Jessica Dinnage – Unruly as Sørine**‡; Lene Maria Christensen – Unruly as Frk. Nielsen; Bodil Jørgensen – The Quiet Migration as Karen; Sonja Oppenhagen – Tove's Room as Ms. Andersen; Sara Fanta Traore – Empire as Petrine
**Best Production Design**: **The Promised Land – Jette Lehmann**‡; Ehrengard: The Art of Seduction – Margrethe II; Liberation – Heidi Plugge; The Quiet Migration – Josephine Farsø; Unruly – Rie Lykke	**Best Cinematography**: **The Promised Land – Rasmus Videbæk**‡; Copenhagen Does Not Exist – Jacob Møller; Empire – Linda Wassberg; The Great Silence – Mia Mai Dengsø Graabæk; The Quiet Migration – Louise McLaughlin; Unsinkable – Loui Ladegaard
**Best Costume Design**: **Ehrengard: The Art of Seduction – Margrethe II**‡; Empire – Charlotte Moe; Liberation – Emilie Bøge Dresler; The Promised Land – Kicki Ilander; Unruly – Mads Nikolaj Elley Jacobsen	**Best Makeup**: **The Promised Land – Sabine Schumann**‡; The Angel Maker – Sofie de Mylius; Liberation – Tina Helmark; Nightwatch: Demons Are Forever – Henrik Steen and Thomas Foldberg; Unruly – Sara Sofia Kasper
**Best Editing**: **Apolonia, Apolonia – Andreas Bøggild Monies and Thor Ochsner**‡; Darkland: The Return – Kasper Leick; The Great Glitch / Children of Paradise – Mathias Saabye; The Great Silence – Nikoline Løgstrup; Music for Black Pigeons – Adam Nielsen; The Promised Land – Olivier Bugge Coutté	**Best Sound Design**: **Apolonia, Apolonia – Anna Żarnecka-Wójcik and Jacques Pedersen**‡; Darkland: The Return – Adrian Aurelius and Philip Nicolai Flindt; Music for Black Pigeons – Peter Albrechtsen; Nightwatch: Demons Are Forever – Nino Jacobsen; The Promised Land – Claus Lynge and Hans Christian Kock; Thanks for Your Service – Anne Gry Friis Kristensen
**Best Score**: **Apolonia, Apolonia – Jonas Struck**‡; Darkland: The Return – Jens Ole Wowk McCoy; The Great Silence – Johan Carøe; The Promised Land – Dan Romer; Unsinkable – Anders Malta and Jonas Struck; Viktor vs the World – Lasse Aagaard	**Best Song**: **"Så ved man, hvad man får" from The Land of Short Sentences – Music and Lyric: Lasse Dein, Christian Grinderslev, and Andreas Hedegaard Mikkelsen; Performer: Lasse Dein**‡; "A Beautiful Life" from A Beautiful Life – Music and Lyric: Christopher, Petter Tarland, and Pär Westerlund; Performer: Christopher; "Jeg har dig" from Rosa and the Stone Troll – Music and Lyric: Pil Kalinka Nygaard Jeppesen and Rasmus Lundgaard Olsen; Performer: Pil; "Life's a High" from Peculiar People – Music and Lyric: Emma Grankvist, Gabriel Beltrone, and Rasmus Bille Bahncke; Performer: eee gee; "Shabholm" from Shabholm – Music and Lyric: Kevin "kephoi" Iversen and Mike Lowrey; Performer: Gigis
**Best Short Fiction/Animation**: **An Example – Christian Lønhart, Selma Sunniva, and Kristine Plechinger Tüchsen**‡; Ivalu – Rebecca Pruzan, Kim Magnusson, and Anders Walter; The Last Straw – Nadia Abrahamsen, Lovísa Dröfn, and Andrias Høgenni; Salmon – Pelle Axel von Schantz Iversen, Karoline Jørgensen, and Mattis Huus Heurlin; The Shift – Emma Lind, Amalie Maria Nielsen, and Oscar Anker Wiedemann	**Best Visual Effects**: **The Promised Land – Alexander Schepelern and Nina Strøm**‡; Ehrengard: The Art of Seduction – Erik Hals, Katharina Bormann, Martin Madsen, and Sune Reinhardt; Jomfruer fra rummet – Dan Dirckinck-Holmfeld; Liberation – Simon Sandin; Nightwatch: Demons Are Forever – Erik Hals, Katharina Bormann, and Martin Madsen
**Best Documentary Feature**: **Apolonia, Apolonia – Sidsel Lønvig Siersted and Lea Glob**‡; The Monk – Christian Sønderby Jepsen and Mira Jargil; The Mountains – Mathilde Hvid Lippmann and Christian Einshøj; Music for Black Pigeons – Emile Hertling Péronard, Andreas Koefoed, and Jørgen Leth; Twice Colonized – Emile Hertling Péronard and Lin Alluna	**Best Documentary Short**: **The Day I Died – Iben Søtang and Alexander Rahnami Mannstaedt**‡; Eternal Father – Alma Dyekjær Giese and Ömer Sami; Once Upon a Time on Twitch – Anna Cold Winge Leisner and Rikke Nørgaard; Soviet Bus Stops – Peter Alsted and Kristoffer Hegnsvad; Vildkvinde – Kristian Pugholm and Pauline Merrildgaard
**Best Non-English Language Film**: **Close in French and Dutch – Lukas Dhont; Distributed by Camera Film**‡; The Blue Caftan in Arabic – Maryam Touzani; Distributed by Camera Film; The Conference in German – Matti Geschonneck; Distributed by Camera Film; The Eight Mountains in Italian – Felix van Groeningen and Charlotte Vandermeersch; Distributed by Camera Film; Fallen Leaves in Finnish – Aki Kaurismäki; Distributed by Camera Film; The Quiet Girl in Irish – Colm Bairéad; Distributed by Camera Film	**Best English Language Film**: **Oppenheimer – Christopher Nolan; Distributed by United International Pictures**‡; Barbie – Greta Gerwig; Distributed by Warner Bros. Denmark; Killers of the Flower Moon – Martin Scorsese; Distributed by United International Pictures; Tár – Todd Field; Distributed by United International Pictures; The Whale – Darren Aronofsky; Distributed by Nordisk Film Distribution

==== Films with multiple nominations and awards ====
Films that received multiple nominations
Nominations	Film
14	The Promised Land
10	Unruly
7	The Great Silence
7	Tove's Room
6	Empire
5	Apolonia, Apolonia
4	Darkland: The Return
4	The Land of Short Sentences
4	Liberation
4	The Quiet Migration
4	Unsinkable
3	Ehrengard: The Art of Seduction
3	The Great Glitch / Children of Paradise
3	Music for Black Pigeons
3	Nightwatch: Demons Are Forever
2	Copenhagen Does Not Exist
2	Rosa and the Stone Troll
2	Shabholm
2	Viktor vs the World

Films that received multiple awards
Awards	Film
8	The Promised Land
5	Apolonia, Apolonia
2	Unruly

=== Television ===
**Best Danish Television Series**: **Prisoner (Danish title: Huset)**‡; Agent (TV 2); Carmen Curlers 2 (DR1); Chorus Girls (TV 2); The Nurse (Netflix)	**Best Short Television Series**: **Killjoy (TV 2)**‡; Behind Every Man (DR); Face to Face (Viaplay); One of the Boys (Viaplay); Valdes Jul - Skovens Vogter (TV 2)
**Best Actor in a Leading Television Role**: **David Dencik – Prisoner as Henrik (DR1)**‡; Morten Hee Andersen – Carmen Curlers 2 as Axel (DR1); Jacob Lohmann – Oxen as Niels Oxen (TV 2); Jakob Oftebro – Chorus Girls as Robert (TV 2); Esben Smed – Agent as Joe (TV 2)	**Best Actress in a Leading Television Role**: **Sofie Gråbøl – Prisoner as Miriam (DR1)**‡; Fanny Louise Bernth – The Nurse as Pernille Kurzmann Larsen (Netflix); Marie Bach Hansen – Chorus Girls as Sussie (TV 2); Josephine Park – The Nurse as Christina Aistrup Hansen (Netflix); Maria Rossing – Carmen Curlers 2 as Birthe (DR1)
**Best Actor in a Supporting Television Role**: **Gustav Dyekjær Giese – Prisoner as Benji (DR1)**‡; Anders W. Berthelsen – Chorus Girls as Preben Kaas (TV 2); Sami Darr – Prisoner as Hulken (DR1); Nicolai Jørgensen – Carmen Curlers 2 as Frans (DR1); Christian Tafdrup – Carmen Curlers 2 as Poul (DR1)	**Best Actress in a Supporting Television Role**: **Laura Christensen – Prisoner as Sille (DR1)**‡; Fanny Leander Bornedal – Carmen Curlers 2 as Kathrine (DR1); Mille Lehfeldt – Chorus Girls as Ulla-Berit (TV 2); Josephine Park – Oxen as Margrethe Franck (TV 2); Marie Reuther – Chorus Girls as Joy (TV 2)

==== Shows with multiple nominations and awards ====
Shows that received multiple nominations
Nominations	Film
6	Carmen Curlers 2
6	Chorus Girls
6	Prisoner
3	The Nurse
2	Agent
2	Oxen

Shows that received multiple awards
Awards	Film
5	Prisoner
