= List of Danish films of the 2020s =

The following table is a list of films produced in Denmark or in the Danish language during the 2020s (decade). For an alphabetical list of all Danish films currently on Wikipedia see Category:Danish films. For Danish films from other decades see the Cinema of Denmark box above.

Danish Title	English Title	Director(s)	Cast	Genre	Ref
2020
Druk	Another Round	Thomas Vinterberg	Mads Mikkelsen	Drama	
En helt almindelig familie	A Perfectly Normal Family	Malou Reymann	Mikkel Boe Følsgaard, Kaya Toft Loholt, Rigmor Ranthe, Neel Rønholt, Jessica Dinnage, Hadewych Minis, Tammi Øst, Kristian Halken, Peter Zandersen, Omar Abdel-Galil, Shireen Rasool Elahi Panah, Wilfred Schandorff Worsøe	Drama	
Kød og blod	Wildland	Jeanette Nordahl	Sidse Babett Knudsen	Thriller	
Retfærdighedens Ryttere	Riders of Justice	Anders Thomas Jensen	Mads Mikkelsen	Action, Comedy	
Shorta	Enforcement	Frederik Louis Hviid, Anders Ølholm		Drama	
2021
Flugt	Flee	Jonas Poher Rasmussen		Documentary	
Margrete den Første	Margrete: Queen of the North		Trine Dyrholm	Historical Drama	
The Middle Man		Bent Hamer	Pål Sverre Hagen, Tuva Novotny, Paul Gross, Don McKellar, Rossif Sutherland	Comedy	
Skyggen i mit øje	The Shadow in My Eye	Ole Bornedal	Fanny Bornedal, Alex Høgh Andersen, Danica Curcic, Bertram Bisgaard, Ester Birch, Ella Nilsson, Malena Lucia Lodahl, Alban Lendorf, Inge Sofie Skovbo, James Tarpey	War, Drama	
Smagen af sult	A Taste of Hunger	Christoffer Boe	Nikolaj Coster-Waldau	Drama	
2022
Gæsterne	Speak No Evil	Christian Tafdrup	Fedja van Huêt, Karina Smulders, Morten Burian, Sidsel Siem Koch	Horror, Thriller	
Vanskabte Land	Godland	Hlynur Pálmason	Elliott Crosset Hove, Ingvar Eggert Sigurðsson	Drama	
Kysset	The Kiss	Bille August	Esben Smed, Clara Rosager, Lars Mikkelsen, David Dencik, Rosalinde Mynster	Drama, Romance	
2023
Twice Colonized		Lin Alluna	Aaju Peter	Documentary	
Underverden II	Darkland: The Return	Fenar Ahmad	Dar Salim, Birgitte Hjort Sørensen, Stine Fischer Christensen	Action	
Ehrengard: The Art of Seduction		Bille August	Alice Zanden, Mikkel Følsgaard, Sidse Babett Knudsen	Drama, Comedy, Romance	
Bastarden	The Promised Land	Nikolaj Arcel	Mads Mikkelsen, Amanda Collin, Simon Bennebjerg, Melina Hagberg, Gustav Lindh	Drama	
Toves værelse	Tove's Room	Martin Zandvliet	Paprika Steen, Lars Bryggman, Joachim Fjelstrup	Drama	
2024
Rom		Niclas Bendixen	Bodil Jørgensen, Rolf Lassgård, Kristian Halken	Drama	
	The Girl with the Needle	Magnus Von Horn	Vic Carmen Sonne, Trine Dyrholm	Drama	
Vogter	Sons	Gustav Möller	Sidse Babett Knudsen, Sebastian Bull, Dar Salim	Drama	
2025
Sauna	Sauna	Mathias Broe	Magnus Juhl Andersen, Nina Rask, Dilan Amin, Klaus Tange	Drama	
