= 56th Bodil Awards =

2003 Danish film awards ceremony

- Date: 2 March 2003
- Site: Imperial Cinema, Copenhagen
- Hosted by: Søren Østergaard and Pernille Højmark

Highlights
- Best Film: Opens Hearts
- Best Actor: Jens Albinus; Facing the Truth
- Best Actress: Paprika Steen; Okay
- Most awards: Opens Hearts (3)
- Most nominations: Opens Hearts and Minor Mishaps (6)

The 56th Bodil Awards were held on 2 March 2003 in the Imperial Cinema in Copenhagen, Denmark, honouring the best national and foreign films of 2002. Susanne Bier's Open Hearts took three awards, winning Best Danish Film as well as the awards for Best leading Actor Actress which went to Nikolaj Lie Kaas and Paprika Steen respectively. Paprika Steen also won the award for Best Actress in a Leading Role for her performance in Okay, while Jens Albinus won Best Actor in a Leading Role. The David Lynch film Mulholland Drive was named Best American Film and Almodovar's Talk to Her the Best Non-American Film. Kim Fupz Aakeson, Anders Thomas Jensen and Mogens Rukov collectively received a Bodil Honorary Award for their work as screenwriters.

== Winners and nominees ==
=== Best Danish Film ===
- Open Hearts – Susanne Bier
  - Okay – Jesper W. Nielsen
  - Facing the Truth – Nils Malmros
  - Minor mishaps – Annette K. Olesen
  - Wilbur Wants to Kill Himself

=== Best Actor in a Leading Role ===
- Jens Albinus – Facing the Truth
  - Ole Ernst Okay
  - Jørgen Kiil – Minor Mishaps
  - Mads Mikkelsen – Opens Hearts

=== Best Actress in a Leading Role ===
- Paprika Steen – Okay
  - Sonja Richter – Opens Hearts
  - Maria Würgler Rich – Minor Mishaps
  - Maria Bonnevie – I Am Dina

=== Best Actor in a Supporting Role ===
- Nikolaj Lie Kaas – Open Hearts
  - Jesper Christensen – Okay
  - Jesper Christensen – Minor Mishaps
  - Henrik Pripp – Minor Mishaps

=== Best Actress in a Supporting Role ===
- Paprika Steen – Opens Hearts
  - Julia Davis – Wilbur Wants to Kill Himself
  - Jannie Faurschou – Minor Mishaps
  - Birthe Neumann – Opens Hearts

=== Best American Film ===
- Mulholland Drive
  - In the Bedroom
  - Gosford Park
  - The Man Who Wasn't There
  - The Royal Tenenbaums

=== Best Non-American Film ===
- Talk to Her
  - The Man Without a Past
  - Yi Yi
  - Y Tu Mamá También
  - The Piano Teacher

== See also ==
- 2003 Robert Awards
