= 65th Bodil Awards =

2012 Danish film awards ceremony

- Date: 3 March 2012
- Site: Bremen Theater, Copenhagen
- Hosted by: Ditte Hansen and Louise Mieritz

Highlights
- Best Film: Melancholia
- Best Actor: Nikolaj Lie Kaas; A Funny Man
- Best Actress: Lena Maria Christensen; A Family
- Most awards: A Funny Man (4)

The 65th Bodil Awards were held on 3 March 2012 in the Bremen Theater in Copenhagen, Denmark, honouring the best national and foreign films of 2010. Lars von Trier's Melancholia won the awards for Best Danish Film and Best Cinematography (Alberto Claro). The only other multiple winner was A Funny Man, which took the awards for Best Actor (Nikolaj Lie Kaas), Best Supporting Actor (Lars Ranthe) and Best Set Design (Charlotte Bay Garnov and Peter Grant). It also won the new Audience Award which was introduced this year in collaboration with Blockbuster. The awards for Best Leading and Supporting Actresses went to Lena Maria Christensen won the award for Best Actress for her performance in A Family and Paprika Steen won Best Supporting Actress for SuperClásico. Testamentet directed by Christian Sønderby Jepsen earned the award for Best Documentary. Winter's Bone was named Best American Film while the Iranian A Separation was selected as Best Non-American Film.

The actress Ghita Nørby received a Bodil Honorary Award and the producer Jes Graversen received a Special Award.

== Winners ==
=== Best Danish Film ===
- Melancholia
  - A Family
  - A Funny Man
  - Rebounce
  - SuperClásico

=== Best Documentary ===
- The Testament
  - Ambassadøren
  - Svend
  - ½ Revolution
  - Præsidenteno

=== Best Actor in a Leading Role ===
- Nikolaj Lie Kaas – A Funny Man
  - Jesper Christensen – A Family
  - Anders W. Berthelsen – SuperClásico

=== Best Actress in a Leading Role ===
- Lena Maria Christensen – A Family
  - Frederikke Dahl Hansen – Rebounce
  - Kirsten Dunst – Melancholia
  - Malou Reymann – Love Is in the Air

=== Best Actor in a Supporting Role ===
- Lars Ranthe – A Funny Man
  - Pilou Asbæk – A Family
  - David Dencik – Room 304
  - John Hurt – Melancholia
  - Kiefer Sutherland – Melancholia

=== Best Actress in a Supporting Role ===
Paprika Steen – SuperClásico

- Anne Sofie Espersen – Rebounce
- Charlotte Gainsbourg – Melancholia
- Anne Louise Hassing – A Family
- Charlotte Rampling – Melancholia

=== Best Cinematography ===
- Manuel Alberto Claro – Melancholia

=== Best American Film ===
- Winter's Bone
  - Drive
  - Black Swan
  - True Grit
- Tree of Life

=== Best Non-American Film ===
- A Separation
  - Another Year
  - Of Gods and Men
  - Oslo, August 31st
  - The King's Speech

=== Bodil Special Award ===
- Jes Graversen (film distributor, Miracle Film)

=== Bodil Honorary Award ===
- Ghita Nørby

=== Audience Award ===
- A Funny Man (actress)

=== Henning Bahs Award ===
- Charlotte Garnov and Peter Grant, scenography (A Funny Man)

== See also ==
- 2012 Robert Awards
