= Emile Hertling Péronard =

Greenlandic film producer (born 1979)

Emile Hertling Péronard is a Greenlandic film producer, who is partner with Inuk Silis Høegh in the Ánorâk Film documentary studio. He is most noted as a producer of the 2023 film Twice Colonized, which won the Canadian Screen Award for Best Feature Length Documentary at the 12th Canadian Screen Awards.

Born and raised in Nuuk, he works in both Nuuk and Copenhagen.

He was also a dual Robert Award nominee for Best Documentary Feature at the 41st Robert Awards in 2024, with nominations for both Twice Colonized and Music for Black Pigeons.

== Filmography ==
- Sumé: The Sound of a Revolution (Sumé – mumisitsinerup nipaa) - 2014
- The Raven and the Seagull (Lykkelænder) - 2018
- Aquarela - 2018
- Winter's Yearning (Håbets ø) - 2019
- The Fight for Greenland (Kampen om Grønland) - 2020
- The Green Land - 2021
- Tuullik - 2021
- Polaris - 2022
- Music for Black Pigeons - 2022
- Ivalu - 2022
- Tartupaluk (Prototype) - 2023
- Kalak - 2023
- Twice Colonized - 2023
- Walls - Akinni Inuk - 2025
