= Lars Ranthe =

Danish actor

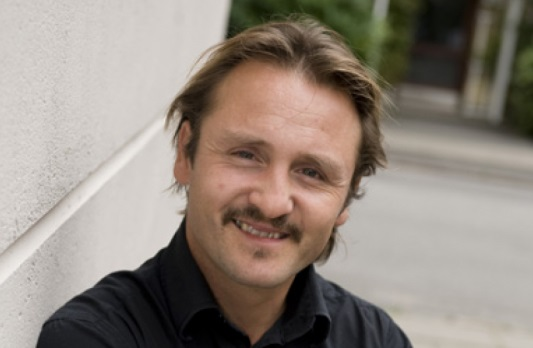
- Ranthe in 2012
- Born: Lars Kristian Ranthe; 26 August 1969 (age 55); Vesterbro, Copenhagen, Denmark
- Occupation: Actor

Lars Kristian Ranthe (born 26 August 1969) is a Danish actor.

== Personal life ==
Ranthe married to actress Christina Albeck Børge in 1998 with whom he has two daughters, actress Rigmor Ranthe (born 2004) & Betty Marie Ranthe (born 2008).

== Selected filmography ==
Year	Title	Role	Notes
2000	The Bench		
2001	Agnethe		
2002	Minor Mishaps		
2002	Okay		
2003	The Green Butchers		
2003	Old, New, Borrowed and Blue		
2003	Scratch		
2004	Aftermath		
2004	Brothers		
2004	In Your Hands		
2005	Adam's Apples		
2005	Flies on the Wall		
2005	Store planer		
2005	True Spirit		
2005	Vakuum		
2006	Clash of Egos		
2011	A Funny Man		
2011	Freddy Frogface		
2012	The Hunt		
2016	The Commune		
2020	Another Round		
2024	Matters of the Heart	Peter	

== Selected television work ==
Year	Title	Role	Notes
1984	Crash		television series
2007	Mors Dreng		television film
2008	Sommer		television series
2009	Manden Med de Gyldne Ører		television series
2009	Pagten		television series
2013-2014	Dicte	Torsten Svendsen	television series
2013-	Badehotellet	Merchant Georg Madsen	television series
2017	Ride Upon the Storm (Danish: Herrens Veje)	Daniel (psychiatrist)	television series
2019	Face to Face	Frank	television series
2021	The Chestnut Man	Nylander	television series
2013 ‧ present ‧ 9 seasons	Seaside Hotel (Badehotellet)	georg madsen	television series
