= That Time of Year =

2018 film

- Film poster
- Directed by: Paprika Steen
- Written by: Jakob Weis
- Starring: Sofie Gråbøl; Paprika Steen; Lars Brygmann
- Release date: 7 September 2018 (TIFF)
- Running time: 101 minutes
- Country: Denmark
- Language: Danish

That Time of Year (Danish: Den tid på året) is a 2018 Danish comedy film directed by Paprika Steen. It was screened in the Contemporary World Cinema section at the 2018 Toronto International Film Festival.

== Cast ==
- Sofie Gråbøl as Barbara
- Paprika Steen as Katrine
- Lars Brygmann as Torben
- Jacob Lohmann as Mads
- Lars Knutzon as Poul
