= The Day Will Come (2016 film) =

2016 film

- Directed by: Jesper W. Nielsen
- Starring: Lars Mikkelsen; Sofie Gråbøl
- Production company: Zentropa Entertainments
- Release date: 21 April 2016
- Running time: 119 minutes
- Country: Denmark
- Language: Danish

The Day Will Come (Danish: Der kommer en dag) is a 2016 Danish drama film directed by Jesper W. Nielsen. It won six prizes at the 2017 Robert Awards.

== Cast ==
- Lars Mikkelsen as Forstander Frederik Heck
- Sofie Gråbøl as Lærer Lilian
- Harald Kaiser Hermann as Elmer
- Albert Rudbeck Lindhardt as Erik
- Laurids Skovgaard Andersen as Tøger
- Lars Ranthe as Overlærer Toft Lassen
- Søren Sætter-Lassen as Lærer Aksel
- David Dencik as Inspektør Hartmann
- Sonja Richter as Moren
- Solbjørg Højfeldt as Fru Oskarson
- Lucas Helt Mortensen as Røde
- Oskar Damsgaard as Topper
