= Sommer (TV series) =

- Created by: Jesper W. Nielsen; Karina Dam
- Starring: Jesper Langberg; Lisbet Dahl; Mikael Birkkjær; Lars Ranthe; Marie Louise Wille; Cecilie Bøcker Rosling
- Music by: Lars Daniel Terkelsen, Halfdan E
- Country of origin: Denmark
- No. of episodes: 20

Production
- Running time: 59 minutes

Original release
- Network: Danmarks Radio
- Release: 1 January – 20 November 2008

Sommer is a Danish TV-drama aired on DR1 in 2008. The series was created by Jesper W. Nielsen and Karina Dam

== Cast ==
Skuespiller	Rolle
Jesper Langberg	Christian Sommer
Lisbet Dahl	Sofia Sommer
Mikael Birkkjær	Adam Sommer
Lars Ranthe	Jakob Sommer
Marie Louise Wille	Mille Kaiser
Cecilie Bøcker Rosling	Lærke Kaiser
Camilla Bendix	Anna Krogh Møller
Ida Dwinger	Ulla
