= Empire (2023 film) =

2023 period drama film

- Directed by: Frederikke Aspöck
- Written by: Anna Neye
- Produced by: Nina Leidersdorff; Meta Louise Foldager Sørensen; Pernille Munk Skydsgaard
- Starring: Anna Neye; Sara Fanta Traore
- Cinematography: Linda Wassberg
- Edited by: Martin Schade
- Music by: Rasmus Bille Bahncke
- Production companies: Meta Film; Brain Academy; Seven Islands Film
- Release date: 29 January 2023 (Gothenburg)
- Running time: 93 minutes
- Country: Denmark
- Language: Danish

Empire (Danish: Viften) is a 2023 absurdist period drama film directed by Frederikke Aspöck from a screenplay by Anna Neye. It stars Neye and Sara Fanta Traore.

The film had its world premiere on 29 January 2023 at the 2023 Gothenburg Film Festival. It won the 2023 Nordic Council Film Prize.

== Premise ==
In the Danish West Indies in 1848, Anna Elizabeth Heegaard, a wealthy "free colored" woman, maintains a close friendship with Petrine, her housekeeper who is enslaved. Meanwhile, rumors of a slave rebellion begin to circulate.

== Cast ==
- Anna Neye as Anna Elizabeth Heegaard
- Sara Fanta Traore as Petrine
- Claus Riis Østergaard as Peter von Scholten
- Jesper Groth as Admiral Carl Irminger

== Production ==
The idea of the film was conceived during Neye's trip to Saint Croix in 2015, where she filmed a documentary about the history of black Danes. In January 2021, the project received €144,700 funding from the Nordisk Film & TV Fond.

The principal photography took place in Canary Islands in May and June 2021.

== Release ==
Empire had its world premiere on 29 January 2023 at the Gothenburg Film Festival, competing for the Dragon Awards. REinvent acquired the film's international sales shortly after the world premiere.

The film was released in Danish theatres on 20 April 2023. Netflix acquired its distribution rights, releasing it on 23 October 2023.

== Accolades ==
Award	Date	Category	Recipient	Result	Ref.
Gothenburg Film Festival	4 February 2023	Dragon Award	Empire	Nominated	
Nordic Council Film Prize	1 November 2023	Nordic Council Film Prize	Empire	Won	
Robert Awards	3 February 2024	Best Danish Film	Nina Leidersdorff, Frederikke Aspöck, and Anna Neye	Nominated	
Robert Awards	3 February 2024	Best Actress in a Leading Role	Anna Neye	Nominated	
Robert Awards	3 February 2024	Best Actress in a Supporting Role	Sara Fanta Traore	Nominated	
Robert Awards	3 February 2024	Best Original Screenplay	Anna Neye	Nominated	
Robert Awards	3 February 2024	Best Cinematography	Linda Wassberg	Nominated	
Robert Awards	3 February 2024	Best Costume Design	Charlotte Moe	Nominated	
Bodil Awards	16 March 2024	Best Danish Film	Empire	Nominated	
Bodil Awards	16 March 2024	Best Actress in a Supporting Role	Sara Fanta Traore	Nominated	
Bodil Awards	16 March 2024	TV 2 Talent Prize	Sara Fanta Traore	Nominated	
Bodil Awards	16 March 2024	Best Screenplay	Anna Neye	Nominated	
