= The Great Silence (2022 film) =

2022 drama film

- Directed by: Katrine Brocks
- Written by: Katrine Brocks
- Produced by: Pernille Tornøe
- Starring: Kristine Kujath Thorp; Elliott Crosset Hove
- Cinematography: Mia Mai Dengsø Graabæk
- Edited by: Nikoline Løgstrup
- Music by: Johan Carøe
- Production company: Monolit Film
- Release date: 17 September 2022 (San Sebastián)
- Running time: 95 minutes
- Country: Denmark
- Language: Danish

The Great Silence (Danish: Den Store Stilhed) is a 2022 drama film directed by Katrine Brocks in her feature directorial debut from a screenplay she wrote with Marianne Lentz. It stars Kristine Kujath Thorp.

The film had its world premiere at the 70th San Sebastián International Film Festival. It was nominated for seven awards at the 41st Robert Awards, including Best Danish Film.

== Premise ==
Alma prepares for her vow as a nun when her estranged alcoholic brother unexpectedly shows up at the monastery.

== Cast ==
- Kristine Kujath Thorp as Sister Alma
- Elliott Crosset Hove as Erik
- Karen-Lise Mynster as mother superior
- Diêm Camille Gbogou as Sister Martha
- Petrine Agger as Sister Dorothea
- Bodil Lassen as Sister Elisabeth

== Production ==
Brocks revealed that the central theme of the film was inspired by her upbringing in a Christian community and the experience of attending the perpetual vow of a family friend. The project was selected as a part of the 2021 Finnish Film Affair, 2022 Nordic Film Market, and 2022 Marché du Film.

== Release ==
The Great Silence had its world premiere at the 70th San Sebastián International Film Festival on 17 September 2022 during the New Directors section. It was released in Danish theatres on 12 January 2023.

== Accolades ==
Award	Date	Category	Recipient	Result	Ref.
San Sebastián International Film Festival	24 September 2022	Kutxabank-New Directors Award	Katrine Brocks	Nominated	
Chicago International Film Festival	21 October 2022	Roger Ebert Award – New Directors	Katrine Brocks	Won	
Lübeck Nordic Film Days	6 November 2022	Best First Feature Film	Katrine Brocks	Won	
Robert Awards	3 February 2024	Best Danish Film	Pernille Tornøe, Katrine Brocks, and Marianne Lentz	Nominated	
Robert Awards	3 February 2024	Best Director	Katrine Brocks	Nominated	
Robert Awards	3 February 2024	Best Original Screenplay	Katrine Brocks and Marianne Lentz	Nominated	
Robert Awards	3 February 2024	Best Actor in a Supporting Role	Elliott Crosset Hove	Nominated	
Robert Awards	3 February 2024	Best Cinematography	Mia Mai Dengsø Graabæk	Nominated	
Robert Awards	3 February 2024	Best Editing	Nikoline Løgstrup	Nominated	
Robert Awards	3 February 2024	Best Score	Johan Carøe	Nominated	
Bodil Awards	16 March 2024	Best Danish Film	The Great Silence	Nominated	
Bodil Awards	16 March 2024	Best Actress in a Leading Role	Kristine Kujath Thorp	Nominated	
Bodil Awards	16 March 2024	Best Actor in a Supporting Role	Elliott Crosset Hove	Won	
Bodil Awards	16 March 2024	Best Actress in a Supporting Role	Karen-Lise Mynster	Nominated	
Bodil Awards	16 March 2024	Best Cinematographer	Mia Mai Dengsø Graabæk	Nominated	
Bodil Awards	16 March 2024	TV 2 Talent Award	Marianne Lentz (Note: Shared with her work in The Quiet Migration.)	Nominated	
