= Harry & Charles =

- Genre: Historical drama
- Written by: Jonas Cornell
- Country of origin: Norway
- No. of episodes: 3

Original release
- Network: NRK

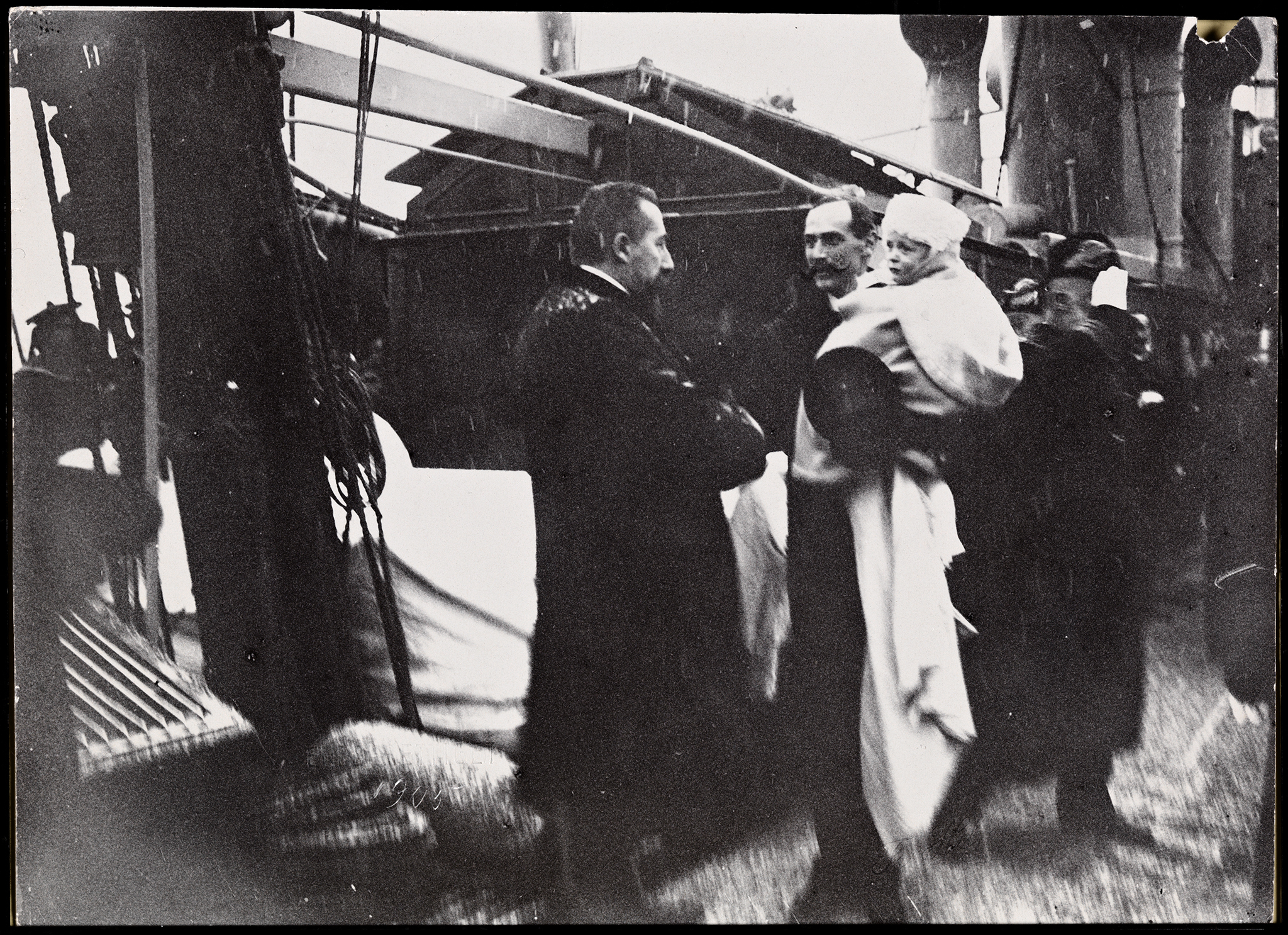
Photograph depicting the real arrival of King Haakon VII in 1905

Harry & Charles is a three part Norwegian TV-mini series produced by the state broadcaster NRK. The series was released in 2009 and focused on the dissolution of the union between Sweden and Norway and the royal election of Prince Carl of Denmark.

== Plot ==
The series follows Prince Carl of Denmark (Charles), his wife Maud (Harry), their son Alexander and their Lady-in-waiting Tulle Carstensen, during the time before and after the dissolution of the union between Sweden and Norway in 1905. Prince Carl is faced with a dramatic decision when he is asked to become the new King of Norway.

Other historic characters include Prime minister Christian Michelsen, polar explorer Fridtjof Nansen and King Oscar II.

== Cast ==
The cast includes :-

- Jakob Cedergren - Prince Carl of Denmark/Haakon VII of Norway
- Maria Bonnevie - Maud of Wales
- Viktor Andersen - Alexander
- Laura Bro - Tulle Carstensen
