= Jakob Cedergren =

Swedish and Danish actor (born 1973)

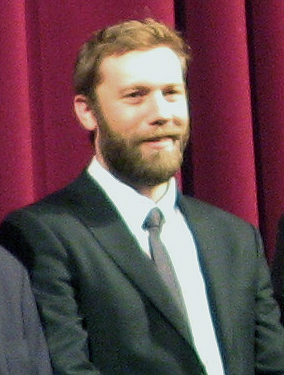
- Jakob Cedergren at the 2009 Berlinale Palast
- Born: 10 January 1973 (age 53); Lund, Sweden
- Citizenship: Sweden; Denmark
- Education: Danish National School of Performing Arts
- Occupation: Actor
- Years active: 1998-present
- Awards: Bodil Award for Best Actor in a Leading Role; Robert Award for Best Actor in a Leading Role

Jakob Cedergren (born 10 January 1973) is a Swedish and Danish actor who has appeared in films, television and theatre. He has starred in several cinema productions, including Stealing Rembrandt, Dark Horse, Rage, Timetrip – Der Fluch der Wikinger-Hexe and Submarino. However, he became best known for his roles in the Scandinavian television series Those Who Kill and The Sandhamn Murders.

== Biography ==
He has appeared in more than 40 films and television shows since 1998. He starred in the film Dark Horse, which was screened in the Un Certain Regard section at the 2005 Cannes Film Festival.

In 2009, he portrayed the Danish Prince Carl/King Haakon VII of Norway in the Norwegian TV-miniseries Harry & Charles. Maria Bonnevie played his wife, Maud. Since 2010 he has been starring in the Swedish crime series The Sandhamn Murders.

In 2018, he received critical acclaim for his lead performance in the Danish crime thriller film The Guilty.

== Selected filmography ==
- Stealing Rembrandt (2003)
- Dark Horse (2005)
- Offscreen (2006)
- The Killing (2007)
- Arn – The Knight Templar (2007)
- Arn – The Kingdom at Road's End (2008)
- Remix (2008)
- Terribly Happy (2008)
- Rage (2009)
- Submarino (2010)
- Morden i Sandhamn (2010–2018)
- Sorrow and Joy (2013)
- The Squad (2015)
- Compulsion aka Sadie (2016) as Alex
- The Guilty (2018)
