= Ali Abbasi =

Ali Abbasi may refer to:

- Ali Abbasi (director) (born 1981), Iranian-Danish film director
- Ali Abbasi (television host) (1961–2004), Pakistani-born Scottish television presenter
