= Parents (2016 film) =

- Official release poster
- Danish: Forældre
- Directed by: Christian Tafdrup
- Written by: Christian Tafdrup
- Produced by: Thomas Heinesen; Christel C.D. Karlsen; Henrik Zein
- Starring: Søren Malling; Bodil Jørgensen; Elliott Crosset Hove; Miri-Ann Beuschel
- Cinematography: Maria von Hausswolff
- Production companies: Nordisk Film; New Danish Screen
- Release date: 15 April 2016 (Tribeca Film Festival)
- Running time: 86 minutes
- Country: Denmark
- Language: Danish

Parents (Danish: Forældre) is a 2016 Danish drama film directed by Christian Tafdrup. Søren Malling won a Robert Award for Best Actor in a Leading Role for his role as Kjeld.

== Premise ==
When their son Esben moves away from home, Kjeld and Vibeke decide to move to something smaller. They discover that their old apartment is for sale and move back to start fresh. Kjeld decorates the apartment as it once looked, and together they relive their youthful days in love. But what once defined them may no longer exist, and one morning events take a turn neither of them could have predicted as they wake up thirty years younger.

== Cast ==
- Bodil Jørgensen as Vibeke
- Søren Malling as Kjeld
- Miri Ann Beuschel as Vibeke
- Emilia Imperatore Bjørnvad as Sandra
- Anton Honik as Esben
- Elliott Crosset Hove as Kjeld
