= Jessica Dinnage =

Danish actress (born 1993)

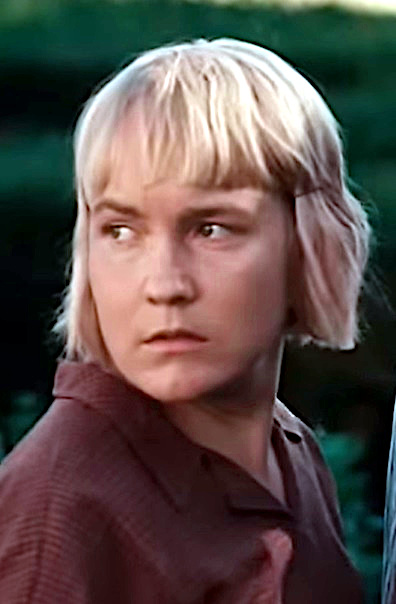
- Dinnage in Unruly 2022
- Born: 22 October 1993 (age 32)
- Occupation: Actress

Jessica Dinnage (born 22 October 1993) is a Danish actress. She is best known for her role as Lea in Netflix's TV series The Rain. In 2019, Dinnage won a Robert Award for Best Actress in a Supporting Role at the Danish Film Academy Robert Awards for her performance as Iben in the 2018 film The Guilty.

== Early life ==
Jessica Dinnage studied at the Danish National School of Performing Arts (Den Danske Scenekunstskole) in Copenhagen.

== Career ==
Dinnage made her screen acting debut in Charlotte Sieling's film The Man in 2017. This was followed in 2018 with a main role in Gustav Möller's 2018 film The Guilty institutioner/den-dansk alongside Jakob Cedergren, about a police search for a kidnapped woman, which was selected as Denmark's official entry for the Best Foreign Language Film at the Academy Awards. Later in 2018, she starred alongside Alba August, Lucas Lynggaard Tønnesen and Angela Bundalovic as Lea in the Netflix series The Rain, which tells the story of a group of people trying to survive six years after a deadly virus carried in the rain wiped out nearly all humans in Scandinavia.

In 2019, Dinnage won a Robert Award for Best Actress in a Supporting Role at the Danish Film Academy annual Robert Awards for her performance as Iben in The Guilty.

== Filmography ==
=== Film ===
Year	Title	Role	Notes
2017	Dan Dream	Baker's Maiden	
2017	The Man	Lilly	
2018	The Guilty	Iben	Voice role
2019	Ninna	Jeanette	
2020	A Perfectly Normal Family	Naja	Danish: En Helt Almindelig Familie
2022	Unruly	Sørine	Danish: Ustyrlig
2025	Vægtløs		

=== Television ===
Year	Title	Role	Notes
2018–2019	The Rain	Lea	Main role
2021	Fars Drenge (Daddy's Boys)	Lærke	Episode 1.8

== Awards and nominations ==
Year	Award	Category	Nominated work	Result	Ref.
2019	Danish Film Academy Robert Awards	Best Actress in a Supporting Role	The Guilty	Won	
2024	Danish Film Academy Robert Awards	Best Actress in a Supporting Role	Unruly	Won	
2024	Bodil Awards	Best Supporting Actress	Unruly	Won	
