= Jesper W. Nielsen =

Danish film director and editor (born 1962)

- Born: 1962 (age 63–64); Denmark
- Occupation: Director

Jesper Westerlin Nielsen is a Danish film director, known for Okay (2003), The Day Will Come (2016), and several TV series.

== Early life and education ==
Nielsen was born in 1962, and in 1989 graduated as a film editor from the Den Danske Filmskole (Danish Film School).

== Career ==
Early in his career, Nielsen edited feature films by Anders Refn, Thomas Vinterberg and Erik Clausen. He then became noted as a director of children's films, such as Retfærdigheden rytter (1989), The Last Viking (1997) and Forbudt for børn (1998).

In 2003, he made his breakthrough with the critically acclaimed adult drama film Okay, for which he was awarded the Dreyer Award. He is also known the film The Bouncer, and the TV series Pagten.

He also wrote the 2008 series Sommer with Karina Dam.

== Filmography ==
List of films and television shows directed
Title	Year	Notes
Ligusterkrigeren	1987	Short film
Retfærdighedens rytter	1989	
Hjerter i slør (Veiled Hearts)	1992	Winner: Robert Award for Best Documentary Short
Buldermanden	1996	Short film
The Last Viking	1997	
Southern Comfort	1997	
Ogginoggen	1997	Short film
Forbudt for børn (Little Big Sister)	1998	Nominated: Bodil Award for Best Danish Film
Okay	2002	Nominated: Robert Award for Best Director; Nominated: Robert Award for Best Danish Film; Nominated: Bodil Award for Best Danish Film; Nominated: Nordic Council Film Prize
The Bouncer	2003	
Store planer!	2005	
I et speil, i en gåte	2008	Winner: Amanda Award for Best Children's Film; Winner: Schlingel International Film Festival Junior Film Award; Winner: Schlingel International Film Festival Top Award in the Junior Film Competition
Pagten	2009	TV series
Lykke (Happy Life)	2011–12	TV series; Nominated: Robert Award for Best Danish Television Series
Borgen	2011–13	TV series
Badehotellet	2014	TV series
Dicte	2014	TV series
The Day Will Come	2016	Winner: Filmfest Hamburg Commerzbank Audience Award
Redwater	2017	TV series
Greyzone	2018	TV series
Undtagelsen (The Exception)	2019	Thriller film, based on Christian Jungersen's 2004 novel
