= Applause (2009 film) =

Applause (2009)
- Danish theatrical poster
- Directed by: Martin Zandvliet
- Written by: Anders August; Martin Zandvliet
- Produced by: Mikael Christian Rieks
- Starring: Paprika Steen
- Cinematography: Jesper Tøffner
- Edited by: Per Sandholt
- Music by: Sune Martin
- Release date: September 25, 2009
- Running time: 85 minutes
- Country: Denmark
- Language: Danish
- Budget: DKK 3.6 million

Applause (Danish: Applaus) is a 2009 Danish film starring Paprika Steen from director/co-writer Martin Peter Zandvliet and Koncern Film. It tells the story of an actress's journey to reclaim her life and her family from the ravages of alcoholism and divorce.

== Plot ==
Actress Thea Barfoed has been critically acclaimed but also suffers from alcoholism, which has disrupted her life. She has been divorced and lost custody of her two boys.

Eager to break with the past, regain control over her life, and get her children back, she uses charm and manipulation to persuade her ex-husband, Christian, that she is ready and able to take back the mantle of motherhood. She has not completely convinced herself.

On stage, Thea plays Martha, the aggressive and wounded wife in Who's Afraid of Virginia Woolf? Off stage, the actress is mixed up in a drama that has many of the same tragic, toxic ingredients. As Thea contends with the rigorous demands of stage life and a past that haunts her, she must face her inner demons. But what she and her family both know is that Thea is Thea, a prima donna better suited to acting her heart out than living an ordinary life.

== Cast ==
- Paprika Steen as Thea Barfoed
- Michael Falch as Christian Barfoed
- Otto Leonardo Steen Rieks as William Barfoed
- Noel Koch-Søfeldt as Matthias Barfoed
- Lars Brygmann as George
- Johanne Dam as Pige på café
- Michael Kastrupsen as AA mand
- Uffe Rørbæk Madsen as Peter
- Sara-Marie Maltha as Maiken
- Malou Reymann as Påklædersken
- Shanti Roney as Tom
- Annette Rossing as Pige på café
- Henriette Rossing as Bardame (bartender)
- Nanna Tange as Ekspedient
- Nikolaj Lie Kaas as Skuespiller (uncredited)

== Release ==
The film was released in Denmark on September 25, 2009. North American distributor World Wide Motion Pictures Corporation released the film theatrically on December 3, 2010 in Los Angeles and had a wider release in Los Angeles and New York on January 21, 2011. The film was shown at the European Union Film Festival on March 20 and 23, 2011 and River City Cinema, Maine on April 8, 2011. The film will be shown at the Minneapolis/ St. Paul International Film Festival on April 21 and 24, 2011. A general run in South Florida began on April 22, 2011, and in Austin, San Antonio, & Denver on September 16, 2011.

=== Critical response ===
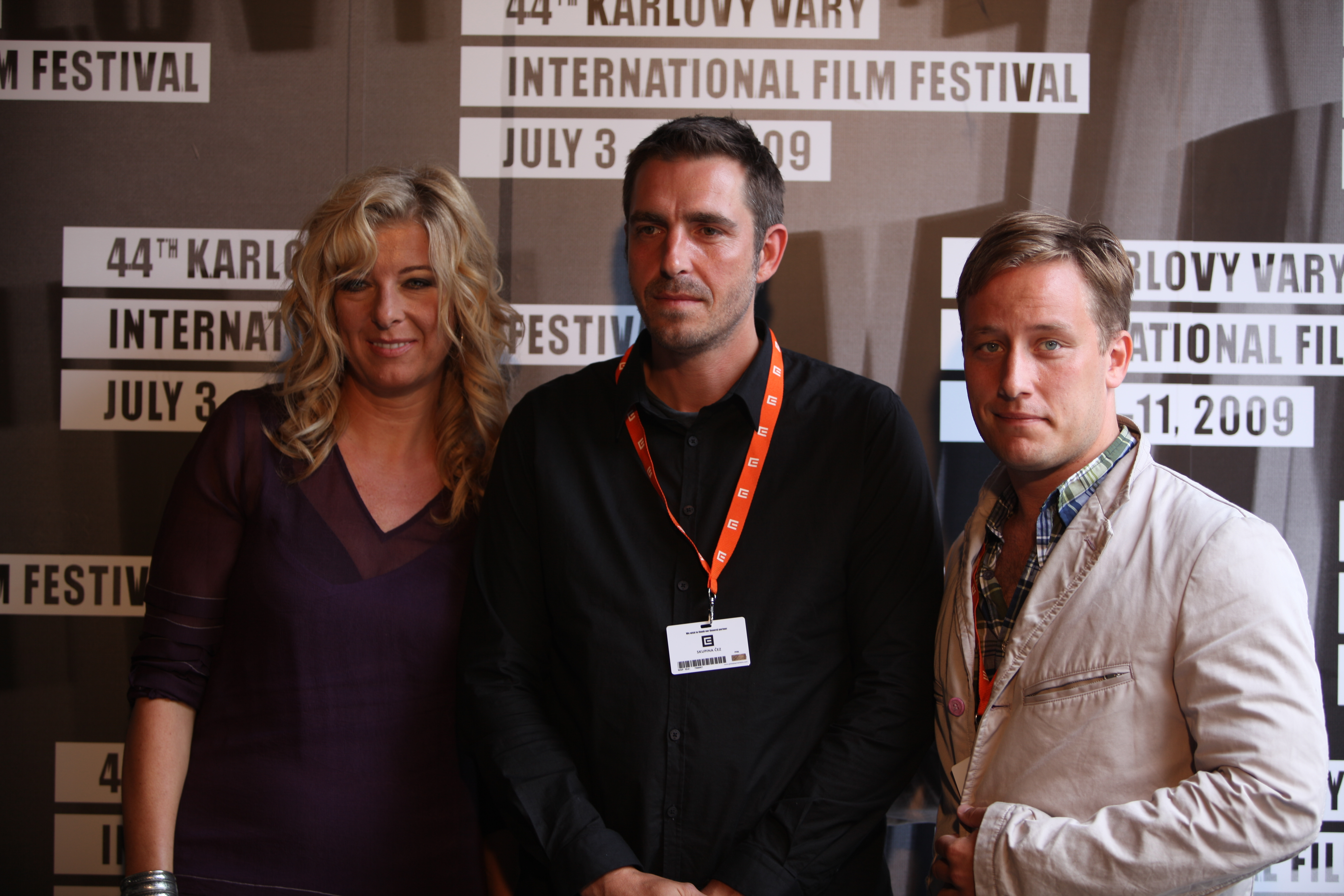
Steen, Zandvliet and August in Karlovy Vary

Premiering at the Karlovy Vary Film Festival in the Czech Republic in July 2009 and continuing on the international festival circuit, Applaus received critical acclaim and was recognized with numerous awards. CNN's Neil Curry named the picture as one of four Danish films to watch, film critic Roger Ebert called Paprika Steen's performance “extraordinary," Variety's Alyssa Simon hailed it as "fearless and tour-de-force", The Los Angeles Times' reviewer Betsy Sharkey called Paprika Steen's performance "Deeply affecting...unflinchingly real." Entertainment Weekly' Lisa Schwarzbaum said ""Paprika Steen brings a thrilling emotional nakedness and...unsentimental honesty to the part." and The New York Times' Karen Durbin called Paprika Steen's performance "one of the best screen performances of the year".

On review aggregator website Rotten Tomatoes, the film holds an approval rating of 89% based on 27 reviews, with an average rating of 7.2/10.

=== Accolades ===
Applaus has received several film festival awards, including:

- Zurich Film Festival - Critics' Choice Award
- Nashville Film Festival - Bridgestone Grand Jury Prize for Best Actress in Narrative Feature: Paprika Steen
- Hamptons International Film Festival - Outstanding Achievement in Acting: Paprika Steen
- Karlovy Vary International Film Festival - Best Actress: Paprika Steen
- Robert Award - Best Actress: Paprika Steen
- Zulu Awards - Best Actress: Paprika Steen
- Mumbai International Film Festival - Best Actress: Paprika Steen
- Rouen Nordic Film Festival - "Deuxième Souffle" Award: Martin Zandvliet
