= The Promised Land (2023 film) =

2023 Danish film

- International release poster
- Danish: Bastarden
- Directed by: Nikolaj Arcel
- Screenplay by: Nikolaj Arcel; Anders Thomas Jensen
- Based on: The Captain and Ann Barbara by Ida Jessen
- Produced by: Louise Vesth
- Starring: Mads Mikkelsen; Amanda Collin; Simon Bennebjerg
- Cinematography: Rasmus Videbæk
- Edited by: Olivier Bugge Coutté
- Music by: Dan Romer
- Production companies: Zentropa Entertainments; Nordisk Film & TV Fond; Sveriges Television; TV2 Danmark; Zentropa International Sweden; Zentropa
- Distributed by: Nordisk Film Distribution (Denmark)
- Release dates: 31 August 2023 (Venice); 5 October 2023 (Denmark)
- Running time: 127 minutes (cinema) or 122 minutes (home distribution)
- Countries: Denmark; Germany; Sweden
- Languages: Danish; Swedish; German
- Budget: €8 million
- Box office: $2,246,680

The Promised Land (Danish: Bastarden, IPA: [pæˈstɑˀtn̩], lit. 'The bastard') is a 2023 epic historical drama film directed by Nikolaj Arcel and written by Arcel and Anders Thomas Jensen. Based on the 2020 book The Captain and Ann Barbara by Ida Jessen, the film is a joint Danish-German-Swedish co-production starring Mads Mikkelsen, Amanda Collin and Simon Bennebjerg, and with Kristine Kujath Thorp, Gustav Lindh, Jakob Lohmann, Morten Hee Andersen, Magnus Krepper and Felix Kramer in supporting roles.

The Promised Land had its world premiere on 31 August 2023 at the 80th Venice International Film Festival where it competed for the Golden Lion. It was selected as the Danish entry for the Best International Feature Film at the 96th Academy Awards, and was one of the 15 finalist films in the December shortlist.

== Plot ==
In 1755, Captain Ludvig Kahlen, an impoverished Danish officer of humble birth, retires after 25 years of service in the Prussian Army with a measly pension. He obtains permission from the Royal Danish Court to build a property on the barren Jutland moorland for land cultivation. He hopes to establish a settlement on this land, and in return for that he requests from the Court the privilege of a noble title with an associated manor. Soon after arriving at the site of his prospective homestead, he comes into conflict with Frederik Schinkel, a local magistrate at the nearby Hald Manor and merciless landowner who has been trying to monopolize ownership of the moorland.

Schinkel does his utmost to make a workforce unavailable to Kahlen, who covertly employs and harbours Johannes Eriksen and his wife Ann Barbara, two of Schinkel's indentured serf farmers who broke their contract and fled Schinkel's mistreatment. After being led to their camp by Anmai Mus, a Romani girl he catches trying to steal from him, he also hires the "Tatere" Romani Travellers as workers, despite this practice being illegal. In the meantime, Schinkel's cousin and betrothed Edel Helene is not interested in marrying him, but her father insists on the marriage due to Schinkel's substantial wealth, unless she can come up with an alternative suitor within a year.

At a harvest ball, Edel meets Kahlen secretly and share a kiss to seal the understanding that if he can acquire a noble title within the year, they will marry, offering her an escape from the union with her cousin. Towards the end of the party, Schinkel reveals that he has recaptured Johannes while he was on his way to the coast to acquire clay for Kahlen's farm. The escaped serf is tortured to death with boiling water by his former master in front of appalled party guests. Kahlen takes Johannes' body back to his wife; seeing the boiled body of their fellow worker, the Travellers leave Kahlen's employment, though Anmai manages to stay behind. Despite multiple challenges during a brutal winter, with Ann's and Anmai's help, Kahlen manages to plant the potatoes brought from Germany and harvest 80 sacks. In the process, the three form an unofficial family; Kahlen and Ann start a sexual relationship.

When the King receives report of the successful harvest, he orders the establishment of a settlement on Kahlen's estate. Kahlen is conferred the title of Royal Surveyor, and 50 settlers from Northern Germany are sent to his land. The superstitious settlers are repulsed by Anmai because of her dark skin and Romani ethnicity, though she manages to stay out of sight and learns reading and surveying from Kahlen.

Furious at Kahlen's success, Schinkel imports convicts to attack the new settlement, killing two settlers and half of the livestock. In revenge, Kahlen and a few settlers attack and kill the perpetrators in their hideout, though he is forced to send Anmai away in exchange for their help. This betrayal also causes Ann to leave. Schinkel's officer, Preisler, witnesses the killings and flees. Schinkel and his fellow estate owners report this to the king's cabinet; the new settlement's ownership is transferred to Schinkel, and Kahlen is arrested.

While Kahlen is being tortured at Schinkel's estate, Ann sneaks in and prepares a poisoned drink; Edel leads Schinkel into drinking it. While he is incapacitated, Ann comes in and stabs him in the stomach and castrates him. Butler Bondo explains everything to the king's cabinet; Kahlen is released, Ann is imprisoned for life, and Edel returns to her home in Norway. Kahlen locates Anmai and promises to take care of her, and the two begin living on the farm.

Several years later, an officer informs Kahlen that he is granted the title of baron, and that 400 new settlers will be arriving soon. Before that happens, a now teenage Anmai leaves with a group of Romani travellers. Kahlen leaves the moor and his title is annulled. He eventually frees Ann from a travelling prisoner cart, and they ride a horse towards the sea.

== Cast ==
- Mads Mikkelsen as Ludvig Kahlen
- Amanda Collin as Ann Barbara
- Simon Bennebjerg as Frederik Schinkel
- Melina Hagberg as Anmai Mus
- Kristine Kujath Thorp as Edel Helene
- Gustav Lindh as Anton Eklund
- Morten Hee Andersen as Johannes Eriksen
- Thomas W. Gabrielsson as Bondo
- Magnus Krepper as Hector
- Søren Malling as Paulli
- Morten Burian as Lauenfeldt
- Jacob Lohmann as Trappaud
- Olaf Højgaard as Preisler
- Felix Kramer

== Production ==
Principal photography began on 5 September 2022 and wrapped in early November of the same year.

Filming took place on locations in Germany, Sweden, and Czechia.

== Release ==
The Promised Land had its world premiere on 31 August 2023 at the 80th Venice International Film Festival, to then screen on 7 September 2023 at the 48th Toronto International Film Festival. It was also invited at the 28th Busan International Film Festival in 'World Cinema' section and was screened on 6 October 2023.

It was released commercially on 5 October 2023, in Danish theaters.

An NTSC DVD version was released in 2024, by Magnolia Home Entertainment. In this format the film can be watched in the original Danish, with or without English subtitles. This DVD also includes a dubbed English audio track and optional subtitles in English. The run time of this version is 127 minutes, which is same as the Cinema release

== Reception ==
=== Critical response ===
On the review aggregator website Rotten Tomatoes, 97% of 130 critics' reviews are positive, with an average rating of 7.9/10. The website's consensus reads: "Mads Mikkelson leads us through the savage terrain of The Promised Land with a glimmer of hope in this epic Nordic tale with Western bones." Metacritic, which uses a weighted average, assigned the film a score of 77 out of 100, based on 29 critics, indicating "generally favorable" reviews.

=== Accolades ===
Award	Date	Category	Recipient	Result	Ref.
Venice International Film Festival	30 August – 9 September 2023	Golden Lion	The Promised Land	Nominated	
European Film Awards	9 December 2023	Best European Actor	Mads Mikkelsen	Won	
European Film Awards	9 December 2023	Best European Cinematographer	Rasmus Videbæk	Won	
European Film Awards	9 December 2023	Best European Costume Designer	Kicki Ilander	Won	
Robert Film Awards	3 February 2024	Robert Award for Best Danish Film	The Promised Land	Won	
Robert Film Awards	3 February 2024	Robert Award for Best Actor in a Leading Role	Mads Mikkelsen	Won	
Robert Film Awards	3 February 2024	Robert Award for Best Actor in a Supporting Role	Simon Bennebjerg	Won	
Robert Film Awards	3 February 2024	Robert Award for Best Production Design	Jette Lehmann	Won	
Robert Film Awards	3 February 2024	Robert Award for Best Cinematography	Rasmus Videbæk	Won	
Robert Film Awards	3 February 2024	Robert Award for Best Makeup	Sabine Schuman	Won	
Robert Film Awards	3 February 2024	Robert Award for Best Visual Effects	Alexander Schepelern, Nina Strøm	Won	
Bodil Film Awards	16 March 2024	Bodil Award for Best Danish Film	The Promised Land	Won	
Bodil Film Awards	16 March 2024	Bodil Award for Best Actor in a Leading Role	Mads Mikkelsen	Won	
Bodil Film Awards	16 March 2024	Bodil Award for Best Cinematographer	Rasmus Videbæk	Won	
Bodil Film Awards	16 March 2024	Henning Bahs Award	Jette Lehmann	Won	

== See also ==
- List of submissions to the 96th Academy Awards for Best International Feature Film
- List of Danish submissions for the Academy Award for Best International Feature Film
- List of awards for The Promised Land, Internet Movie Database
