= Tove's Room =

2023 Danish drama film

- Promotional poster
- Directed by: Martin Zandvliet
- Screenplay by: Jakob Weis
- Based on: Toves værelse by Jakob Weis
- Produced by: Mikael Rieks
- Starring: Paprika Steen; Lars Brygmann; Joachim Fjelstrup; Sonja Oppenhagen
- Cinematography: Camilla Hjelm Knudsen
- Edited by: Ida Bregninge; Per Sandholt
- Production company: Nordisk Film Production
- Release date: 9 February 2023 (Santa Barbara)
- Running time: 73 minutes
- Country: Denmark
- Language: Danish

Tove's Room (Danish: Toves værelse) is a 2023 biographical drama film directed by Martin Zandvliet. The screenplay was written by Jakob Weis, based on his 2016 play. It stars Paprika Steen as the author Tove Ditlevsen. Steen won the Robert Award and Bodil Award for her portrayal of Ditlevsen.

It had its world premiere at the Santa Barbara International Film Festival on 9 February 2023.

== Premise ==
Set in 1963, author Tove Ditlevsen deals with the inferiority complex of her sadistic husband, Victor Andreasen. One day, a young author Klaus Rifbjerg shows up at their house for lunch to discuss literature.

== Cast ==
- Paprika Steen as Tove Ditlevsen
- Lars Brygmann as Victor Andreasen
- Joachim Fjelstrup as Klaus Rifbjerg
- Sonja Oppenhagen as Ms. Andersen

== Production ==
In 2016, Jakob Weis staged a play Toves værelse about author Tove Ditlevsen's fourth marriage with Ekstra Bladet editor-in-chief Victor Andreasen, starred by Paprika Steen and Lars Brygmann. In April 2022, it was announced that the play would be adapted into a feature film and both Steen and Brygmann would reprise their roles.

== Release ==
Tove's Room had its world premiere at the Santa Barbara International Film Festival on 9 February 2023 during the World Premieres section. The film was released in Danish theatres on 22 June 2023.

== Accolades ==
Award	Date	Category	Recipient	Result	Ref.
Norwegian International Film Festival	25 August 2023	Audience Award	Martin Zandvliet	Won	
Robert Awards	3 February 2024	Best Danish Film	Mikael Rieks, Martin Zandvliet, and Jakob Weis	Nominated	
Robert Awards	3 February 2024	Best Director	Martin Zandvliet	Nominated	
Robert Awards	3 February 2024	Best Actor in a Leading Role	Lars Brygmann	Nominated	
Robert Awards	3 February 2024	Best Actress in a Leading Role	Paprika Steen	Won	
Robert Awards	3 February 2024	Best Actor in a Supporting Role	Joachim Fjelstrup	Nominated	
Robert Awards	3 February 2024	Best Actress in a Supporting Role	Sonja Oppenhagen	Nominated	
Robert Awards	3 February 2024	Best Adapted Screenplay	Jakob Weis	Nominated	
Bodil Awards	16 March 2024	Best Danish Film	Tove's Room	Nominated	
Bodil Awards	16 March 2024	Best Actor in a Leading Role	Lars Brygmann	Nominated	
Bodil Awards	16 March 2024	Best Actress in a Leading Role	Paprika Steen	Won	
Bodil Awards	16 March 2024	Best Actor in a Supporting Role	Joachim Fjelstrup	Nominated	
Bodil Awards	16 March 2024	Best Screenplay	Jakob Weis	Nominated	
