= Aftermath (2004 film) =

2004 Danish drama film

- Directed by: Paprika Steen
- Written by: Kim Fupz Aakeson
- Produced by: Thomas Heinesen
- Starring: Sofie Gråbøl; Mikael Birkkjær; Søren Pilmark
- Cinematography: Erik Zappon
- Edited by: Anne Østerud
- Music by: Nikolaj Steen
- Release date: 2004
- Running time: 104 min
- Country: Denmark
- Language: Danish

Aftermath (Danish: Lad de små børn) is a 2004 Danish drama film directed by Paprika Steen.

== Plot ==
Aftermath is about the emotional trauma of a young couple after the death of their daughter.

== Cast ==
- Sofie Gråbøl – Britt Lehmann
- Mikael Birkkjær - Claes Lehmann
- Søren Pilmark - Nisse
- Lena Endre - Vivi
- Karen-Lise Mynster - Anette Christoffersen
- Lars Brygmann - Chef
- Carsten Bjørnlund - Ulrik

== Reception ==
The film received awards at several film festivals including the Lübeck Nordic Film Days and the Film by the Sea International Festival.
