= Mikael Birkkjær =

Danish actor (born 1958)

- Born: Mikael Birkkjær; 14 September 1958 (age 67); Copenhagen, Denmark
- Occupation: Actor
- Years active: 1985–present

Mikael Birkkjær (born 14 September 1958) is a Danish actor.

Raised in Copenhagen, Birkkjær trained at Skuespillerskolen at Odense Teater in 1985. He is best known internationally for his roles as Phillip Christensen in the Danish TV political drama Borgen, and Inspector Ulrik Strange in the 2009 TV series Forbrydelsen.

== Personal life ==
Birkkjær was previously married to actress Tammi Øst with whom he has two children, Rasmus and Andrea;.

== Film ==
- Lad de små børn... (2004) (marketed as Aftermath in English speaking countries)
- Oh Happy Day (2004)
- Springet (2005)
- The Escape (2009)
- Room 304 (2011)
- All Inclusive (2014)
- What We Become (2016)

=== TV Series ===
- Een gang strømer... (1987)
- Krøniken (2005)
- Sommer (2008)
- Forbrydelsen (2009) (marketed as The Killing in English speaking countries)

Sthlm Requiem (TV series season 1 (2018)

- Borgen (2010/2011/2022)
- The Bridge (2018)
- Baby Fever (2022/2024)

=== TV films ===
- En farlig mand (1987)
- Begær, Lighed og Broderskab (1990)
- Boksning (1988)
