= Ivalu (film) =

Danish short film

Ivalu is a 2022 Danish short film directed by Anders Walter and Pipaluk K. Jørgensen. The film is produced by Rebecca Pruzan for M&M Productiuons and based on the graphic novel by Lars Horneman and Morten Dürr.

== Summary ==
In Greenland, Pipaluk awakes to find her older sister Ivalu missing and her father claiming that she's run away. Pipaluk is distressed over the disappearance and believes Ivalu is coming to her in the form of a raven. Pipaluk searches their old hangout spots together, and reminisces on their past interactions. Gradually, it is revealed that Ivalu was being sexually abused by their father, and it is implied that Ivalu died by suicide in order to escape the abuse. Pipaluk sadly mourns her sister, wearing her confirmation outfit to a visit by the Queen of Denmark.

== Accolades ==
The film was nominated for the 2023 Academy Award for Best Live Action Short Film.
