= Lars Brygmann =

Danish actor (born 1957)

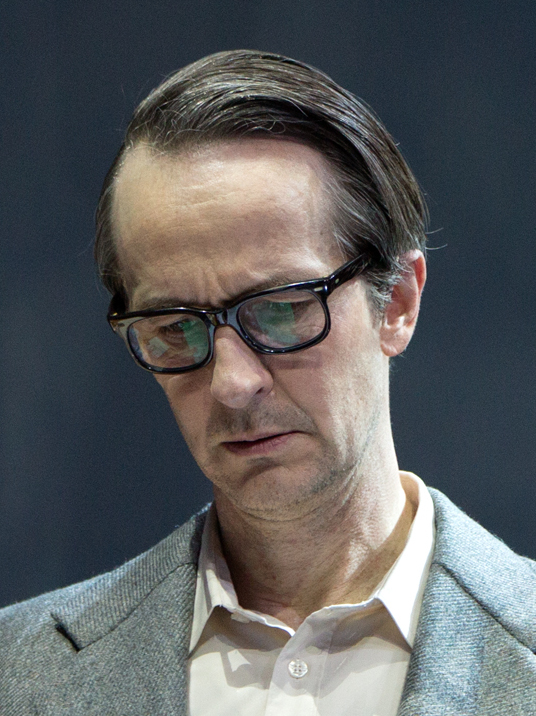
- Brygmann in 2016
- Born: 17 February 1957 (age 68); Copenhagen, Denmark
- Occupation: Actor

Lars Brygmann (born 17 February 1957) is a Danish actor. He graduated from acting school in 1987 and went on to perform in a number of theatres in Denmark. His television and film debut came in 1995. He is the brother of actors Martin and Jens Brygmann.

== Selected filmography ==
=== Film ===
List of film appearances, with year, title, and role shown
Year	Title	Role	Notes
1997	Smilla's Sense of Snow	Verlaine	
1997	Credo	Mormon	
1998	Festen	Lars	
2000	The Bench	Lars	
2003	The Inheritance	Ulrik	
2003	Stealing Rembrandt	Mick	
2004	King's Game	Mads Kjeldsen	
2004	Aftermath	Chef	
2008	Fear Me Not	Frederik	
2008	Terribly Happy	Dr. Zerleng	
2009	Applause	George	
2011	A Funny Man	Stig Lommer	
2011	Skyscraper	Helge	
2017	Good Favour	Mikkel	
2017	The Charmer	Lars	
2018	Kursk	Kasyenenko	
2018	That Time of Year	Torben	
2019	The Professor and the Madman	Max Mueller	
2020	Riders of Justice	Lennart	
2023	Tove's Room	Victor Andreasen	

=== Television ===
List of television appearances, with year, title, and role shown
Year	Title	Role	Notes
1995	Juletestamentet	Abrahamsen	14 episodes
1999	Taxa	Ulrik Warming	4 episodes
2000	Edderkoppen	Dam Jensen	4 episodes
2000–04	Rejseholdet	Thomas La Cour	32 episodes
2003–04	Forsvar	Mikael Frank	9 episodes
2005	Young Andersen	Jonas Collin	2 episodes
2009–10	Lulu & Leon	Leon	24 episodes
2010–11	Borgen	Troels Höxenhaven	7 episodes
2011–12	Lykke	Flemming Rønn Petersen / Flemming Horn Petersen	18 episodes
2013–16	Dicte	John Wagner	24 episodes
2014–15	Bankerot	Gerner	12 episodes
2016	Den anden verden	Philip	24 episodes
2018	Håbet	Kneisvig	4 episodes
2019	Mellem os	Jeppe Bech	8 episodes
2020	Equinox	Dennis	6 episodes
2023	Face to Face	Henrik Lang	1 episode
