= The Guilty (2018 film) =

Film by Gustav Möller

- Theatrical release poster
- Danish: Den skyldige
- Directed by: Gustav Möller
- Written by: Gustav Möller; Emil Nygaard Albertsen
- Produced by: Lina Flint
- Starring: Jakob Cedergren; Jessica Dinnage; Johan Olsen; Omar Shargawi; Katinka Evers-Jahnsen
- Cinematography: Jasper J. Spanning
- Edited by: Carla Luff
- Music by: Carl Coleman; Caspar Hesselager
- Production companies: Nordisk Film Spring; New Danish Screen
- Distributed by: Nordisk Film Distribution
- Release dates: 21 January 2018 (Sundance); 14 June 2018 (Denmark)
- Running time: 85 minutes
- Country: Denmark
- Languages: Danish; English
- Budget: €500,000
- Box office: $4.6 million

The Guilty (Danish: Den skyldige) is a 2018 Danish crime thriller film written by Gustav Möller and Emil Nygaard Albertsen and directed by Möller in his directorial debut. It premiered in the World Cinema Dramatic Competition section of the 2018 Sundance Film Festival, and was later selected as the Danish submission for the Best International Feature Film at the 91st Academy Awards, making the December shortlist.

The Guilty is a drama that unfolds entirely within the confines of an emergency call center, with Jakob Cedergren in the central role of Asger Holm, a distressed Copenhagen police officer with a pending court hearing for use of deadly force, who handles incoming 112 emergency calls. The tension and drama of the film are largely conveyed through the telephone conversations that Asger Holm engages in.

== Plot ==
Asger Holm, a Copenhagen police officer grappling with personal emotions and tension as he awaits a hearing for his on-duty shooting incident that resulted in the death of a 19-year-old man, is temporarily assigned to answer emergency calls at the Emergency East desk.

On the eve of the hearing, he receives a cryptic call from a woman. The caller's name, Iben Østergård, flashes on the call handler's screen, a detail obtained from the mobile number record. Her tone is oddly gentle, as if she's speaking to a child, yet she does not indicate an emergency.

Initially about to dismiss the call as yet another late-night trivial caller, Asger senses that something is not quite right and intuitively begins to ask her yes-or-no questions; she discreetly reveals she has been abducted but explicitly mentions a white van, all before the call is abruptly disconnected.

Tracing the call to the nearest cell site, Asger calls the North Zealand station to tell them to look for a white van driving north. The North Zealand dispatcher tells him this is not enough information, and a licence plate number and specific location are required.

Asger talks to an officer in the North Zealand patrol car which pulls over a light-coloured van but lets it go when no woman is found inside.

Becoming frustrated as he gets drawn into the urgency of the situation, Asger looks up information about Iben Østergård and finds a home telephone number, calling it. Iben's six-year-old daughter Mathilde answers.

Mathilde says her father Michael Berg was at the house, despite being separated from Iben, and drives a white van. Michael had gone into the room of Mathilde's baby brother Oliver and shouted, apparently at Oliver, and then her mother had also gone in and shouted, Mathilde says.

Michael then grabbed Iben and left with her. Mathilde also gives Asger her father's phone number, which she has memorised because he is not allowed to see her.

Mathilde admits that she is scared to be alone. Despite her father Michael's instructions not to enter her brother's room, Asger reassures her and advises her to sit with her baby brother. Following this, Asger calls North Zealand to dispatch police assistance at the house to check on Mathilde and Oliver. In the process, he discovers that Michael has a criminal record.

As the night shift arrives, Asger, now at the end of his shift, secludes himself in a separate room to relentlessly follow Iben's case by staying connected as the original emergency call handler. Intermittently, Asger speaks again to Iben, who says she does not want to be locked up again.

Concurrently, he communicates with the police who have arrived at the Østergård house, where they discover Mathilde, covered in blood. A horrifying revelation awaits them in Oliver's bedroom.

Devastated, Asger calls Rashid, his off-duty police colleague, urging him to go and break into Michael's house for any clues that might hint at his destination.

It is revealed that Asger and Rashid, currently not serving as police partners due to the pending court hearing, have conspired to give false testimony at the hearing into Asger, which worries Rashid. After deliberating, Asger phones Michael's number and engages in a conversation with him, culminating with Asger's chilling declaration that Michael deserves to be executed.

Inside the van, now carrying Iben bundled in the back, another tense call between Iben and Asger takes place. Asger, increasingly worried that Michael intends to harm Iben, instructs her to seize an opportunity to strike Michael with any available object found in the van and escape. Iben, however, reveals that Oliver is now fine and no longer crying. When Asger inquires what she means by this, she reveals that Oliver had 'snakes in his stomach' and was crying, so she 'cut them out' to help him. The call disconnects abruptly, leaving Asger in shock.

Asger then receives a call from Rashid, who is at Michael's house. Rashid has discovered records showing that Michael lost his visitation rights due to his criminal record, while Iben had been admitted to a psychiatric hospital in Elsinore. Asger comes to the realization that a distraught Michael, fully aware of Iben's mental state and having admitted his lost faith in the authorities' understanding, was attempting to take her to the psychiatric hospital because she had unknowingly caused their son's death.

Tormented by these revelations, Asger urges Rashid to tell the truth at the upcoming hearing. He calls Michael again, who discloses his location and that Iben has assaulted him and fled the van. After a period of time, Asger receives another call from Iben, who, having come to the realization that she has killed her son, is on the brink of jumping off a bridge.

Asger confesses to her that he shot a man, not in self-defense, but he assures her that unlike him, he knows she didn't mean to harm anyone. As the sound of approaching police officers can be heard, Asger urges her to surrender. The call disconnects abruptly.

Minutes later, Asger receives a call from the North Zealand police, who confirm they have Iben and commend him on his work. He rises from his desk and walks away slowly, his colleagues watching in disbelief after hearing his confession to Iben. Before leaving the building, Asger makes one last phone call.

== Cast ==
- Jakob Cedergren as Asger Holm
- Jessica Dinnage as Iben Østergård (voice)
- Omar Shargawi as Rashid (voice)
- Johan Olsen as Michael Berg (voice)
- Katinka Evers-Jahnsen as Mathilde Østergård (voice)
- Jacob Lohmann as Bo (voice)
- Simon Bennebjerg as Nikolaj Jensen (voice)
- Laura Bro as Tanja Brix (voice)
- Morten Thunbo as Torben

== Production ==
The genesis of the film was a YouTube clip of a kidnapped woman calling an emergency dispatcher while her kidnapper sat nearby. Möller was struck by how much an audio clip could convey on its own with no visual accompaniment. "It felt like I was seeing images just listening to sound," he said. "It felt like I had seen this woman; I had an idea of the car she was sitting in and the road they were driving on." Another influence was the podcast Serial, about the 1999 murder of a Maryland student. "With every episode I got new information about the people involved and the places and occurrences. With every episode my image of these people changed." Möller and co-writer Emil Nygaard Albertsen followed up by doing research at Danish dispatch centers, the characters emerged from there, including the idea of the main character being a police officer under investigation, who had been reassigned from the field to desk duty.

The research also inspired the intentionally drab set. "When I got out to the first dispatch center, I had expected something much more high tech," Möller said. "And then I saw this room that looked like a shitty office and I loved that. I loved that contrast of these cops dealing with life and death and they're sitting in this boring, kind of dirty room. So that's what I wanted in the production design."

Confining the film to a police dispatch center helped limit the budget to a frugal €500,000 (US$570,671) while forcing the filmmakers to work more creatively. Möller and his director of photography, Jasper Spanning, divided the script into eight segments, changing the camera lenses and cinematic approach for each. The screen time for each segment ultimately ranged from 5 to 35 minutes. Filming employed a three-camera setup and took 13 days. Post-production sound editing took another eight weeks.

Distribution rights to The Guilty in the United States were acquired by Magnolia Pictures at the Sundance Film Festival when the film first premiered there.

== Reception ==
=== Critical response ===
On the review aggregation website Rotten Tomatoes, the film holds an approval rating of 98% based on 120 reviews, with an average rating of 7.9/10. The website's critics consensus reads, "Sleek, well-acted, and intelligently crafted, The Guilty is a high-concept thriller that wrings maximum impact out of a handful of basic—and effective—ingredients." Metacritic assigned the film a normalized score of 83 out of 100, based on 23 critics, indicating "universal acclaim".

=== Accolades ===
Award	Date of ceremony	Category	Recipient(s)	Result	Ref.
Austin Film Critics Association	7 January 2019	Best Foreign Language Film		Nominated	
Bodil Awards	2 March 2019	Best Danish Film	Gustav Möller	Nominated	
Bodil Awards	2 March 2019	Best Actor	Jakob Cedergren	Won	
Bodil Awards	2 March 2019	Blockbuster Talent	Gustav Möller	Won	
National Board of Review	27 November 2018	Top 5 Foreign Language Films		Won	
Satellite Awards	17 February 2019	Best Foreign Language Film		Nominated	
St. Louis Film Critics Association	16 December 2018	Best Foreign Language Film		Nominated	
Robert Awards	February 2019	Best Danish Film	Gustav Möller	Won	
Robert Awards	February 2019	Best Actor	Jakob Cedergren	Won	
Robert Awards	February 2019	Best Director	Gustav Möller	Won	

== Remake ==
After The Guilty's debut, Möller received requests for remake rights from around the world, but declined personal involvement in any of them, preferring instead to work on new projects. In 2018, it was announced that Nine Stories and Jake Gyllenhaal had bought the American rights to The Guilty with Gyllenhaal set to star. In 2020, it was announced the film would be directed by Antoine Fuqua and be adapted by Nic Pizzolatto. The film was shot at a single Los Angeles location sometime in November. Peter Sarsgaard, Ethan Hawke, and Riley Keough were confirmed to join the cast. In September 2020, Netflix acquired worldwide distribution rights to the film for $30 million. The 2019 Tamil-language film 100 starring Atharvaa, Radha Ravi and Hansika Motwani was loosely based on the film.. Dial 100 (2021 film) Hindi filmed is also loosely based on this movie.

== Stage version ==
In 2026, a stage version of The Guilty opened at the Donmar Warehouse in London. The stage adaptation was by Chloë Moss, based on the 2018 screenplay by Gustav Möller and Emil Nygaard Albertsen, and starred Russell Tovey.

== See also ==
- List of submissions to the 91st Academy Awards for Best Foreign Language Film
- List of Danish submissions for the Academy Award for Best International Feature Film
