= Unruly =

Danish film

Unruly (Danish: Ustyrlig, lit. 'Uncontrollable') is a 2023 Danish film, directed by Malou Reymann.

== Plot ==
In Copenhagen in 1933, Maren (Emilie Kroyer Koppel) is a rebellious teenager, who dances to jazz music at nightclubs and parties until late to escape the drudgery and squalor of her home life.

After neighbours complain about her behaviour, Child Services comes to interview her mother, and subsequently decides to place her in a home for delinquent girls. There, she is interviewed by Dr. Wildenskov (Anders Heinrichsen), but finds his simple questions patronising and refuses to answer. He believes she is unable to answer them, and also sexually promiscuous, and diagnoses her as mildly mentally deficient, recommending she be placed in a home on the island of Sprogø.

On Sprogø, she shares a room with Sørine (Jessica Dinnage). Sørine reports any infractions of the rules to staff, hoping that doing so will allow her to be released quickly, to see her young daughter. Interviewed again on Sprogø, Maren once more refuses to answer basic questions. Once she realises she has thereby condemned herself to a long stay on the island and its strict rules, draconian punishment, isolation, and menial work, she begs to be interviewed again, but is refused.

One day workmen visit the island to carry out repairs, and are forced to stay overnight due to heavy seas and bad weather. Maren is attracted to one of them, escapes her room, and spends the night with him. She falls pregnant, and is sent to the mainland to give birth, but her child is removed from her custody within days. While still in hospital, she wakes up one morning to be told that she has been sterilised, according to a recently passed Danish law.

During a movie night on the island, Maren and Sørine create a diversion, and in the ensuing chaos try to escape the island via the boat that carried the projectionist. They are caught before they can start the engine, and Maren jumps into the ocean, where staff are unable to locate her. However, her lifeless body is found in the water the next day.

Eventually Sørine is told that she is allowed to leave the island (although remaining under care of Protective Services), but only if she agrees to be sterilised. Desperate to one day see her daughter, she acquiesces, and is placed as a maid with a frail, elderly couple. After three years with the couple, she is told that she is being released from Protective Services custody, and goes to meet her daughter, Ellen.

The movie closes with Sørine and Ellen walking down a country road, and text revealing that the home on Sprogø was open from 1923 to 1961.

== Reception ==
Unruly has been nominated for several international awards, winning three:

- Best Nordic Film at the 2023 Goteborg Film Festival.
- Fritz Gerlich Prize at the 2023 Munich Film Festival.
- Best Actress (for Emilie Kroyer Koppel), at the 2023 Riviera International Film Festival.
