= Martin Zandvliet =

Danish film director and screenwriter (born 1971)

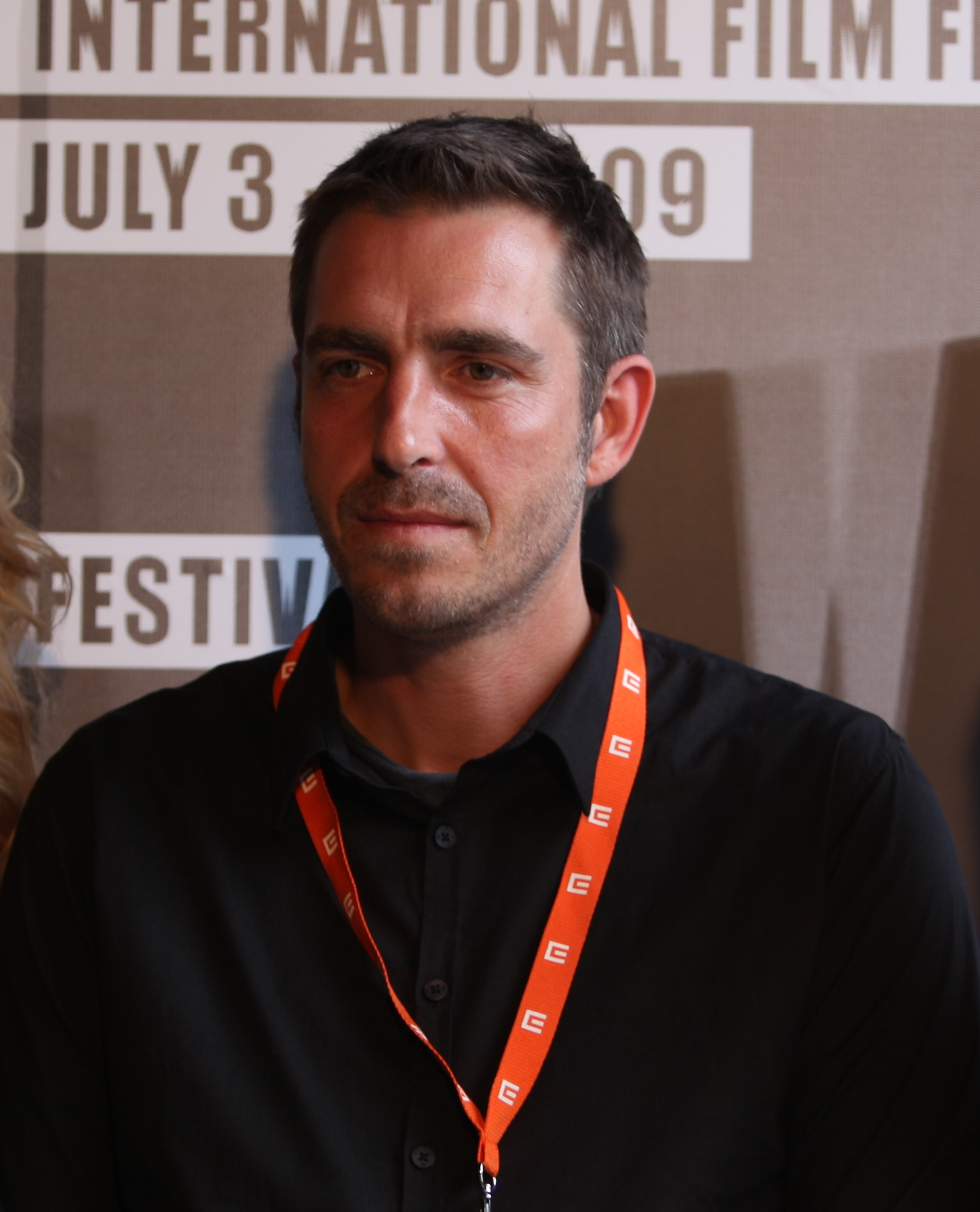
- Martin Zandvliet at KVIFF, 2009
- Born: Martin Pieter Zandvliet; 7 January 1971 (age 55); Fredericia, Denmark
- Education: Super16
- Occupations: Film director, Screenwriter
- Years active: 2002–present
- Notable work: Land of Mine
- Spouse: Camilla Hjelm Knudsen

Martin Pieter Zandvliet (born 7 January 1971 in Fredericia) is a Danish film director and screenwriter.

== Career ==
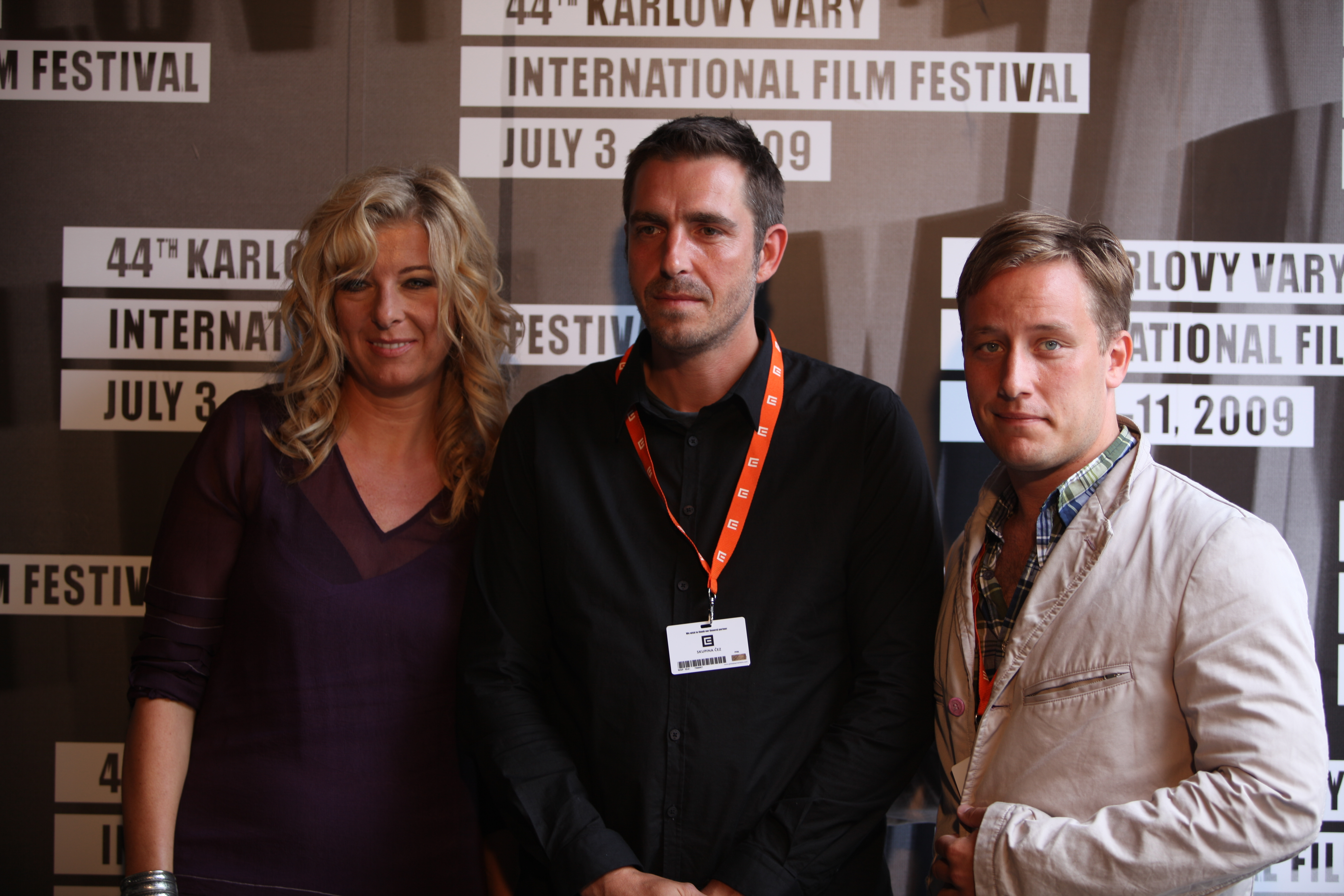
Paprika Steen, Zandvliet and Anders August in Karlovy Vary

Zandvliet originally began as an editor, before writing and directing the documentary Angels of Brooklyn in 2002. His first major picture was Applause in 2009, which received wide praise. He then wrote and directed A Funny Man, based on the life of Danish actor and comedian Dirch Passer. In 2015 he wrote and directed Land of Mine, which received almost universal acclaim at home, with many calling it the best Danish film that year, the film was furthermore nominated for the Academy Award for Best Foreign Language Film at the 89th Academy Awards.

== Filmography ==
Title	Year	Credited as			Notes	Ref(s)
Title	Year	Director	Writer	Actor	Notes	Ref(s)
Applause	2009	Yes	Yes	No		
A Funny Man	2011	Yes	Yes	Yes	Portrays Mus & Mænd director	
Teddy Bear	2012	No	Yes	No		
Land of Mine	2015	Yes	Yes	No		
The Model	2016	No	Yes	No		
The Outsider	2018	Yes	No	No		
The Marco Effect	2020	Yes	Yes	No	Co-written with Jussi Adler-Olsen	
Tove's Room	2023	Yes	No	No	After the play by Jakob Weis (2016)	

== Awards and nominations ==
Year	Award	Category	Nominated work	Result
2003	Robert Festival Awards	Best Documentary	Angels of Brooklyn	Won
2009	Bombay International Film Festival	Golden Gateway	Applause	Nominated
2009	Ghent International Film Festival	Best Film	Applause	Nominated
2009	Karlovy Vary International Film Festival	Crystal Globe	Applause	Nominated
2009	Karlovy Vary International Film Festival	Label Europa Cinemas	Applause	Won
2009	Zurich Film Festival	Critics' Choice Award	Applause	Won
2009	Zurich Film Festival	Best International Feature Film	Applause	Nominated
2010	Bodil Awards	Bodil Award for Best Danish Film	Applause	Nominated
2010	Lecce Festival of European Cinema	Golden Olive Tree	Applause	Nominated
2010	Robert Festival Awards	Best Film	Applause	Nominated
2010	Rouen Nordic Film Festival	"Deuxième Souffle" Award	Applause	Won
2011	Alliance of Women Film Journalists	Best Non-English Language Film	Applause	Nominated
2012	Bodil Awards	Best Film	A Funny Man	Nominated
2012	Bodil Awards	Blockbuster Audience Award	A Funny Man	Won
2012	Robert Festival Awards	Best Film	A Funny Man	Nominated
2012	Robert Festival Awards	Best Director	A Funny Man	Nominated
2012	Robert Festival Awards	Best Screenplay	A Funny Man	Nominated
2012	Zulu Awards	Best Film	A Funny Man	Nominated
2015	Gijón International Film Festival	Audience Award	Land of Mine	Won
2015	Hamburg Film Festival	Art Cinema Award	Land of Mine	Nominated
2015	Tokyo International Film Festival	Tokyo Grand Prix	Land of Mine	Nominated
2015	Toronto International Film Festival	Platform Prize	Land of Mine	Nominated
2016	AFI Fest	World Cinema	Land of Mine	Won
2016	Bodil Awards	Bodil Award for Best Danish Film	Land of Mine	Won
2016	Gothenburg Film Festival	Best Nordic Film	Land of Mine	Won
2016	Hong Kong International Film Festival	SIGNIS Awards (Sri Lanka)	Land of Mine	Won
2016	Miskolc International Film Festival	Adolph Zukor Prize	Land of Mine	Won
2016	Miskolc International Film Festival	International Federation of Film Critics Award	Land of Mine	Won
2016	Miskolc International Film Festival	International Ecumenical Award	Land of Mine	Won
2016	Miskolc International Film Festival	International Ecumenical Award	Land of Mine	Nominated
2016	Mill Valley Film Festival	World Cinema	Land of Mine	2nd Place
2016	Nordic Council	Nordic Council Film Prize	Land of Mine	Nominated
2016	Robert Festival	Best Film	Land of Mine	Won
2016	Robert Festival	Best Director	Land of Mine	Won
2016	Robert Festival	Best Original Screenplay	Land of Mine	Won
2016	Robert Festival	Audience Award	Land of Mine	Won
2016	Rotterdam International Film Festival	Audience Award	Land of Mine	Won
2016	Rotterdam International Film Festival	MovieZone Award	Land of Mine	Won
2016	Sydney Film Festival	Audience Award	Land of Mine	2nd Place
2016	Sydney Film Festival	Sydney Film Prize	Land of Mine	Nominated
2017	Academy Awards	Academy Award for Best Foreign Language Film	Land of Mine	Nominated
