= Fear Me Not =

2008 Danish psychological thriller film

- Theatrical poster
- Directed by: Kristian Levring
- Screenplay by: Anders Thomas Jensen; Kristian Levring
- Produced by: Sisse Graum Jørgensen
- Starring: Ulrich Thomsen; Paprika Steen; Emma Sehested Høeg; Lars Brygmann
- Cinematography: Jens Schlosser
- Edited by: Pernille Bech Christensen
- Distributed by: Nordisk Film
- Release date: 19 December 2008
- Running time: 95 minutes
- Country: Denmark
- Language: Danish

Fear Me Not (Danish: Den du frygter) is a Danish psychological thriller film released in 2008, directed by Kristian Levring. The film premiered at the Toronto International Film Festival and was produced by Zentropa.

== Plot ==
Mikael has taken leave from work because he thinks he needs a change in life. He stays at home with his wife Sigrid and daughter Selma. Sigrid's brother, Frederick, is a scientist and needs subjects to test an experimental anti-depressant, to see if there are side effects. Mikael decides to volunteer for the testing without telling his wife and daughter. During the process he writes a diary about how he feels each day and about the effects of the drugs. The pills make him gradually feel more free, as if he has no boundaries. He leaves the home his wife inherited from her father and goes to stay at his mother's old rural home.

Frederick's team shuts down the experiment after several of the subjects begin to exhibit aggressive and violent behavior, including Mikael. He refuses to let go of the freedom he thinks the pills give him, and he secretly continues to take them, leading him to cross boundaries without caring about the people he hurts in the process. He begins to resent his wife and starts subjecting her to gaslighting, first by scalding her in the shower by turning up the water heater, and later by releasing rats into the bedroom while she sleeps. He also scares a young woman into exposing herself to him while he gives her a ride, and he seduces Frederick's wife.

Getting increasingly disturbed by his own actions, Mikael prepares to confess to Frederik. But before he can gather the courage, Frederik reveals that Mikael has received placebo pills all the time because he would not expose his brother-in-law to unsafe drugs. Selma reads Mikael's diary, and in a panic Mikael locks her in the sauna when she threatens to tell her mother. Sigrid, who has been given a sleeping pill, awakens and fights with Mikael, but he punches her and locks her in the chest freezer. Mikael decides to run away, leaving his wife and daughter trapped. Soon after he leaves, Sigrid escapes from the freezer and lets Selma free.

The film ends with Mikael, who stands at a train station after visiting his mother in a nursing home. He expresses sadness at having left his family and notes that he is still trying to figure out when and why things began to go wrong for him, but the memories still are unpleasant to contemplate.

== Cast ==
- Ulrich Thomsen as Mikael
- Paprika Steen as Sigrid
- Emma Sehested Høeg as Selma
- Lars Brygmann as Frederik
- Stine Stengade as Ellen
- Bjarne Henriksen as Kenneth
- Bodil Udsen as Edith

== Reception ==
The film holds a score of 71% positive reviews on Rotten Tomatoes with the average score of 6.8/10, based on 7 reviews.

Staci Layne Wilson of Horror.com said that "While Fear Me Not may not fulfill the U.S. audience's need for speed, those who are interested in a creepy, unsettling story should definitely tune in for its [June 10, 2009] premiere on IFC's Festival Direct on Demand".

Ed Gonzalez of Slant Magazine called the film a "visual suggestion of madness", while David Harvey of Variety wrote that "Some of Danish cinema's leading lights try to illuminate the murky dramatics of [this film]".
