= A Perfectly Normal Family =

- Film poster
- Danish: En helt almindelig familie
- Directed by: Malou Reymann
- Written by: Malou Reymann; Rune Schøtt-Wieth; Maren Louise Käehne
- Produced by: Matilda Appelin; René Ezra
- Starring: Mikkel Boe Følsgaard; Neel Rønholt; Kaya Toft Loholt; Rigmor Ranthe
- Cinematography: Sverre Sørdal
- Edited by: Ida Bregninge
- Release dates: January 2020 (IFFR); 20 February 2020 (Denmark)
- Running time: 93 minutes
- Country: Denmark
- Language: Danish

A Perfectly Normal Family (Danish: En helt almindelig familie) is a 2020 Danish drama film directed by Malou Reymann and starring Mikkel Boe Følsgaard, Neel Rønholt, Kaya Toft Loholt and Rigmor Ranthe. The film premiered at the 2020 International Film Festival Rotterdam, before releasing in Denmark on 20 February 2020.

== Cast ==
- Mikkel Boe Følsgaard as Thomas / Agnete
- Kaya Toft Loholt as Emma
- Rigmor Ranthe as Caroline
- Neel Rønholt as Helle
- Jessica Dinnage as Naja
- Hadewych Minis as Petra
- Tammi Øst as Vibeke
- Kristian Halken as grandfather
- Peter Zandersen as Peter
- Omar Abdel-Galil as Youssef
- Shireen Rasool Elahi Panah as Sofia
- Wilfred Schandorff Worsøe as Casper

== Reception ==
The film has a 71% rating on Rotten Tomatoes. Sophie Monks Kaufman of Empire awarded the film two stars out of five.

Jay Weissberg of Variety gave the film a positive review, calling it "an engagingly sincere picture of good people trying to negotiate barely charted territory to the best of their abilities."
