= Minor Mishaps =

- DVD cover
- Directed by: Annette K. Olesen
- Written by: Kim Fupz Aakeson
- Produced by: Ib Tardini
- Starring: Jørgen Kiil; Maria Rich; Henrik Prip; Jesper Christensen; Jannie Faurschou; Vigga Bro
- Cinematography: Morten Søborg
- Edited by: Nicolaj Monberg
- Music by: Jeppe Kaas
- Distributed by: Zentropa Entertainment
- Release date: 15 February 2002
- Running time: 109 minutes
- Country: Denmark
- Language: Danish

Minor Mishaps is a 2002 Danish film. It won a number of awards and nominations including the Blue Angel at the 2002 Berlin International Film Festival for director Annette K. Olesen and a nomination for European Discovery of the Year at the European Film Awards.

The film is set in Amager in Denmark.

== Plot ==
Minor Mishaps is the story of a family's reaction to the untimely death of their matriarch, examining the effect of the tragedy on John, her husband, who is himself ill, his daughters, Marianne and Eva, and their friends and family. The film throws a spotlight on each of their lives as they confront the changed dynamic in the family and their own lives, with some surprises, revelations and false accusations occurring along the way.

Olesen developed the film in collaboration with the actors, following the style of Mike Leigh.
