= A Family (2010 film) =

2010 film

- Film poster
- Danish: En Familie
- Directed by: Pernille Fischer Christensen
- Written by: Pernille Fischer Christensen; Kim Fupz Aakeson
- Produced by: Sisse Graum Jørgensen; Vinca Wiedemann
- Starring: Jesper Christensen
- Cinematography: Jakob Ihre
- Edited by: Janus Billeskov Jansen; Anne Østerud
- Music by: Sebastian Öberg
- Release dates: 19 February 2010 (Berlinale); 28 October 2010 (Denmark)
- Running time: 102 minutes
- Country: Denmark
- Language: Danish

A Family (Danish: En Familie) is a 2010 Danish drama film directed by Pernille Fischer Christensen. It was nominated for the Golden Bear at the 60th Berlin International Film Festival.

== Cast ==
- Jesper Christensen as Rikard Rheinwald
- Anne Louise Hassing as Sanne
- Pilou Asbæk as Peter
- Lene Maria Christensen as Ditte
- Line Kruse as Chrisser
- Coco Hjardemaal as Line
- Gustav Fischer Kjærulff as Vimmer
