= SuperClásico =

2011 film

- Film poster
- Directed by: Ole Christian Madsen
- Written by: Ole Christian Madsen; Anders August
- Produced by: Signe Leick Jensen
- Starring: Paprika Steen; Anders W. Berthelsen
- Cinematography: Jørgen Johansson
- Distributed by: Nordisk Film
- Release date: 17 March 2011
- Running time: 99 minutes
- Country: Denmark
- Language: Danish

SuperClásico is a 2011 Danish romantic comedy film set in Argentina and directed by Ole Christian Madsen. The film was selected as the Danish entry for the Best Foreign Language Film at the 84th Academy Awards. On 18 January 2012, the film was named as one of the nine shortlisted entries for the Oscars.

== Plot ==
The Danish wine seller Christian receives the divorce papers of his wife Anna, who works in Argentina as a sports agent. Since their 16-year-old son Oscar is supposed to visit Anna, Christian decides to fly along to convince his wife not to divorce him. However, she already has a relationship with the Argentinian football star Juan Diaz, who is about to play the most important Argentinian football game, the Superclásico. Christian gets to know Argentine culture and people during his stay: The elderly but passionate housekeeper Fernanda, with whom he has a short affair and the odd winegrower Mendoza, who meets a fellow sufferer in Christian.

Meanwhile, son Oscar meets the travel guide Veronica. He runs away from home and starts a relationship with her. When the relationship comes to light, there are problems that can be resolved with Christian's help. When Anna and Juan Diaz have their first arguments, Christian and Anna get closer again. Only then does Christian, changed by the Argentinian culture, begin to let go of Anna. After the marriage of Juan Diaz and Anna, Christian goes happily home to Denmark.

== Cast ==
- Paprika Steen as Anna
- Anders W. Berthelsen as Christian
- Adriana Mascialino as Fernanda
- Sebastián Estevanez as Juan Díaz
- Dafne Schiling as Veronica
- Jamie Morton as Oscar
- Mikael Bertelsen as Narrator
- Miguel Dedovich as Mendoza

== See also ==
- List of submissions to the 84th Academy Awards for Best Foreign Language Film
- List of Danish submissions for the Academy Award for Best Foreign Language Film
