= Open Hearts =

2002 Danish drama film

- Danish movie poster
- Directed by: Susanne Bier
- Written by: Anders Thomas Jensen Susanne Bier
- Produced by: Vibeke Windeløv
- Starring: Mads Mikkelsen; Nikolaj Lie Kaas; Sonja Richter; Paprika Steen
- Cinematography: Morten Søborg
- Edited by: Pernille Bech Christensen
- Music by: Jesper Winge Leisner
- Distributed by: Nordisk Film
- Release date: 2002
- Running time: 113 minutes
- Country: Denmark
- Language: Danish

Open Hearts (Danish: Elsker dig for evigt) is a 2002 Danish drama film directed by Susanne Bier using the minimalist filmmaking techniques of the Dogme 95 manifesto. It stars Mads Mikkelsen, Nikolaj Lie Kaas, Sonja Richter and Paprika Steen. Also referred to as Dogme #28, Open Hearts relates the story of two couples whose lives are traumatized by a car crash and adultery.

Open Hearts received a 93% approval rating on Rotten Tomatoes movie review website. Susanne Bier received the International Critics Award at the 2002 Toronto International Film Festival. The film won both the Bodil and Robert awards for Best Danish Film in 2003.

== Plot ==
Joachim, a young man, is made a tetraplegic and hospitalized indefinitely by a car crash after being hit by Marie. Marie's husband Niels is a doctor at the hospital, and he falls for Joachim's fiancée Cecilie, and they have an affair. Niels then leaves his wife, teenage daughter, and two young boys for Cecilie, who abandons Joachim.

== Cast ==
- Sonja Richter as Cecilie
- Nikolaj Lie Kaas as Joachim
- Mads Mikkelsen as Niels
- Paprika Steen as Marie
- Stine Bjerregaard as Stine
- Birthe Neumann as Hanne
- Niels Olsen as Finn
- Ulf Pilgaard as Thomsen
- Ronnie Hiort Lorenzen as Gustav
- Pelle Bang Sørensen as Emil
- Anders Nyborg as Robert
- Ida Dwinger as Sanne
- Philip Zandén as Tommy
- Michel Castenholt as Salesperson in Ilva
- Birgitte Prins as Doctor
- Susanne Juhasz as Cashier
- Hans Henrik Clemensen as Cook
- Jens Basse Dam as Waiter
- Hanne Windfeld as Nurse 1
- Tina Gylling Mortensen as Nurse 2

== Soundtrack ==
Open Hearts

Soundtrack album by Anggun
- Released: 2002
- Recorded: 2002
- Genres: Urban pop, electronica
- Labels: Columbia, Sony Music
- Producers: Niels Brinck, Jesper Winge Leisner

Anggun chronology
Chrysalis (2000)	Open Hearts (2002)	Luminescence (2005)

Singles from Open Hearts
- 1. "Open Your Heart" Released: 2002; 2. "I Wanna Hurt You" Released: 2005

The soundtrack for the film was recorded by Indonesian-French singer Anggun. The album was released by Columbia Records and Sony Music International in many countries worldwide during 2002 to 2003. It became Anggun's second and final album to be released in the United States, following Snow on the Sahara in 1998. The soundtrack features nine songs written and produced by Jesper Winge Leisner and Niels Brinck, three of which co-written by Anggun.

The album received positive reception from music critics. William Ruhlmann from AllMusic rated it three out five stars, writing that Anggun "matches the propulsive, synthesized musical tracks with breathy, emotive vocals that never lose the beat for all their dramatic appeal." The album's lead single, "Open Your Heart", charted at number 51 on the Norwegian Singles Chart and was nominated for Best Song at the 2003 Robert Awards. "Counting Down" served as a radio-only single in Indonesia and promotional single in Denmark, while "I Wanna Hurt You" was released as 12" vinyl single in Italy.

Track listing

No.	Title	Writer(s)	Length
1.	"Counting Down"	Jesper Winge Leisner; Niels Brinck	3:45
2.	"Open Your Heart"	Anggun; Leisner; Brinck	3:27
3.	"Little Things"	Leisner; Brinck	4:29
4.	"Blue Satellite"	Leisner; Brinck	3:44
5.	"The End of a Story"	Anggun; Leisner; Brinck	4:42
6.	"I'm Your Mirror"	Leisner; Brinck	3:42
7.	"Pray"	Anggun; Leisner; Brinck	4:16
8.	"I Wanna Hurt You"	Leisner; Brinck	3:35
9.	"Naked Sleep"	Leisner; Brinck	4:20
10.	"I Wanna Hurt You" (Niels Brinck club mix)	Leisner; Brinck
11.	"Open Your Heart" (a capella edit)	Anggun; Leisner; Brinck

== Critical reception ==
The film holds a score of 93% positive reviews on Rotten Tomatoes with the average score of 7.3/10, based on 58 reviews. The website's critics consensus reads, "Pulsing with honesty, [Open Hearts] lays bare the rawness of human emotion with a story made all the more believable thanks to its gritty, low-budget approach." On Metacritic, the film holds a score of 77 out of 100, based on 22 reviews from professional critics, indicating "generally favorable reviews".

Nick Schager of Slant Magazine said that "Susanne Biers crafts her familiar story with equal doses of austerity and sympathy".

According to Elbert Ventura of PopMatters the film's scenario is "soapy and bedridden", adding that "Open Hearts is perhaps too studiously open-ended, a misstep we'll take considering the movie's refreshing magnanimity".

== Cancelled remake ==
In 2006, Zach Braff was reported to direct, write, and produce an English-language remake of the film following his debut of Garden State. Paramount Pictures won the rights to produce and distribute in a bidding war between Fox Searchlight Pictures and The Weinstein Company. Sean Penn was set to co-star with Braff in the film, but the film collapsed due to scheduling conflicts and budget issues. Despite this, Braff still hopes to one day make the film.
