= Elliott Crosset Hove =

Danish actor

Elliott Crosset Hove (born 18 March 1988) is a Danish–American actor mostly known for his work with Icelandic director Hlynur Pálmason. He is the son of Danish-Greenlandic actor Anders Hove and American dancer Ann Thayer Crosset. In 2023 he was awarded the Bodil for his role in Godland.

== Filmography ==
=== Film ===
Year	Title	Role	Notes
2013	A painter	The painter's son	Short film directed by Hlynur Pálmason for den Danske Filmskole
2015	April 9th	Private Jens-Otto Lassen	
2016	Parents	Kjeld	
2017	Winter Brothers	Emil	Also known as Danish: Vinterbrødre; Danish drama film directed by Hlynur Pálmason.
2018	Before the Frost	Peder	
2022	Godland	Lucas	Winner Bodil Award for Best Actor in a Leading Role
2022	The Great Silence	Erik	
2024	Basileia		First long feature film by Isabella Torre
2024	The Electric Child	Sonny	

=== Television ===
Year	Title	Role	Notes
2014	Dicte	Frederik	1 episode
2018	The Bridge	Kevin	Recurring role in season 4
2021	The Chestnut Man	Linus Bekker	Recurring role
