= Okay (film) =

2002 film

- Directed by: Jesper W. Nielsen
- Starring: Paprika Steen; Troels Lyby; Ole Ernst
- Cinematography: Erik Zappon
- Release date: 27 March 2002
- Running time: 93 minutes
- Country: Denmark
- Language: Danish

Okay is a 2002 Danish drama film directed by Jesper W. Nielsen.

== Plot ==
Nete is a strong woman of 35 who manages effectively her job, husband, and teenage daughter. After her widowed father suddenly becomes ill, Nete discovers he may have only three weeks to live. Despite their poor relationship, Nete insists he leaves his flat and moves in with her, saying "You should die with your family." She even tries to reconcile him with his estranged gay son, her brother. When he does not die, his presence increasingly places a strain on Nete's family. His appetite returns and the doctors reconsider the prognosis. With pressures increasing in a limited space, Nete's husband accepts offered comfort elsewhere, her daughter rebels with her grandfather's encouragement, and the relationship between Nete and her father unravels.

== Cast ==
- Paprika Steen – Nete
- Troels Lyby – Kristian
- Ole Ernst – Netes Father
- Nicolaj Kopernikus – Martin
- Molly Blixt Egelind – Katrine
- Laura Drasbæk – Tanja
- Trine Dyrholm – Trisse
- Lotte Andersen – Janni
- Jesper Christensen – Læge
- Henrik Prip – Nete's boss
