= Paprika Steen =

Danish actress (born 1964)

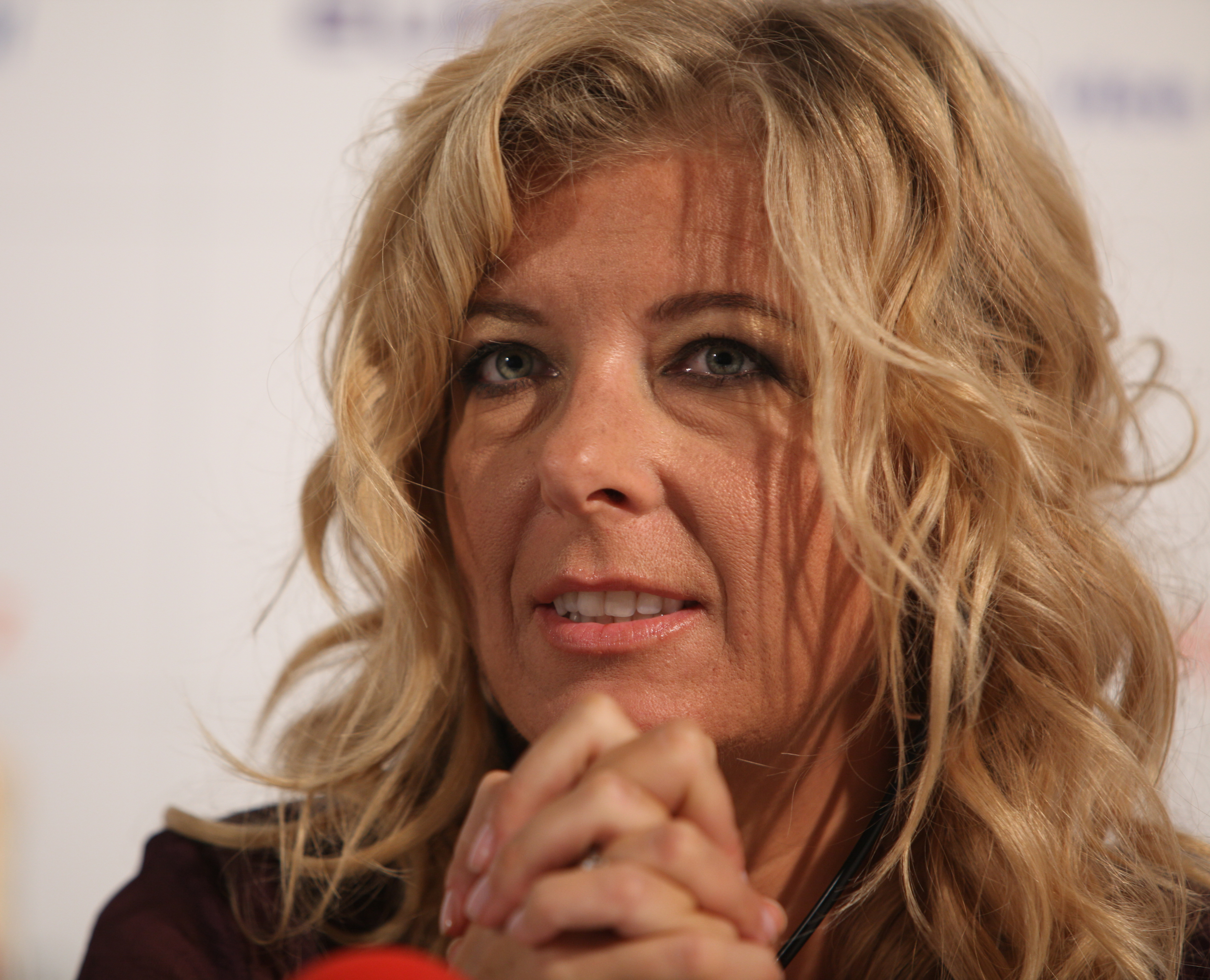
- Steen in July 2009
- Born: Kirstine Steen; 3 November 1964 (age 61); Frederiksberg, Denmark
- Occupations: Actress, director
- Years active: 1988–present
- Spouse: Mikael Rieks

Kirstine "Paprika" Steen (born 3 November 1964) is a Danish actress and director best known for her performances in Dogme 95 films Festen, The Idiots, Mifune, and Open Hearts. Steen was the first Danish actress since Karin Nellemose to win both Best Actress (for Okay) and Best Supporting Actress (Open Hearts) in the same year at the Robert Festival, the Danish equivalent of the Oscars.

== Biography ==
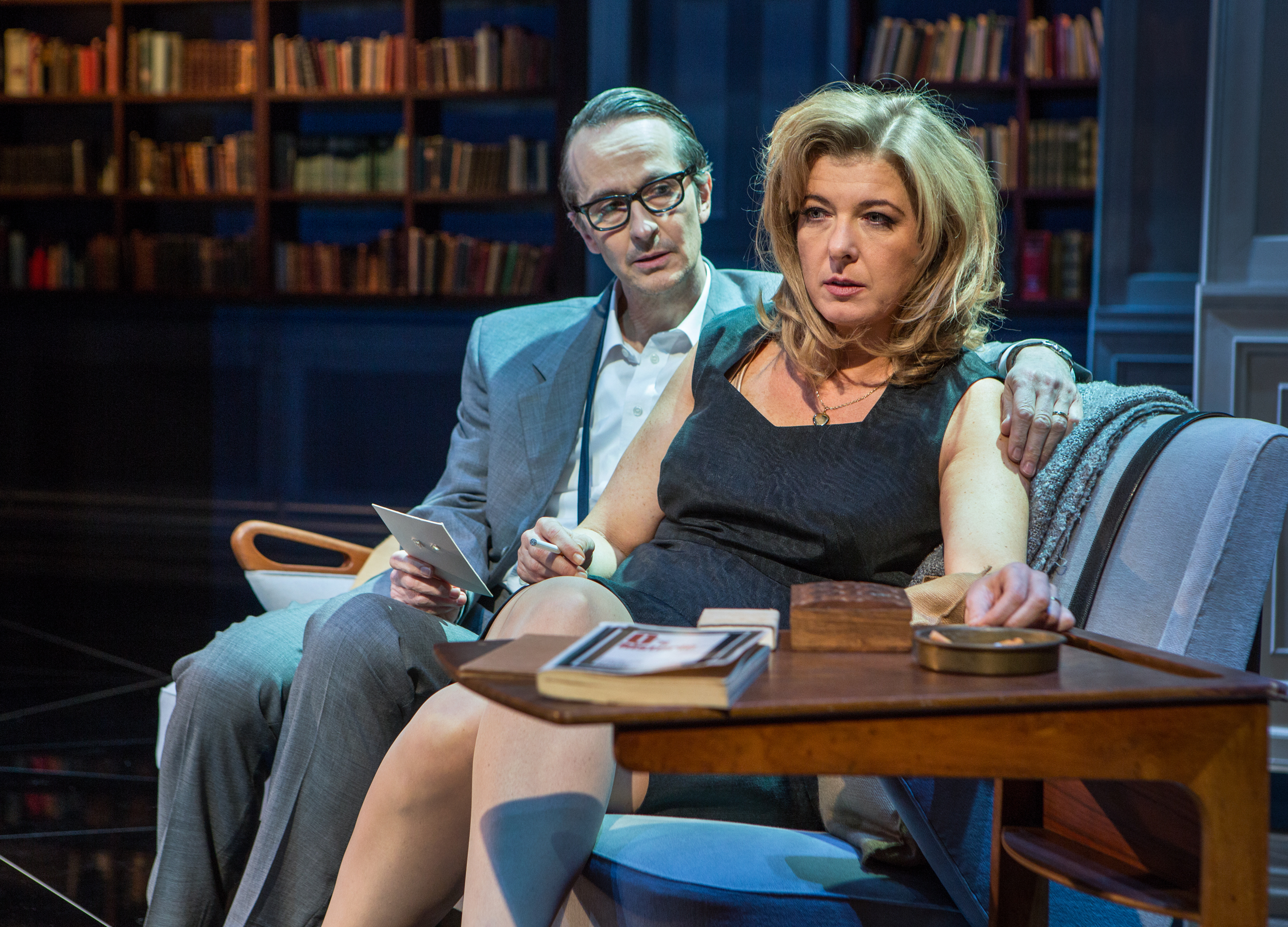
Steen in a theatre production of Toves værelse – Tove Ditlevsens sidste kærlighed in 2016

Steen was born on 3 November 1964 in Frederiksberg, Denmark, the daughter of musician and conductor Niels Jørgen Steen and the actress Avi Sagild. She is the sister of musician and actor Nikolaj Steen. Steen applied to the Acting School of Odense Theatre 13 times before being accepted and attending from 1988 to 1992. Steen performed on stage in Dr. Dante productions and been associated with the Royal Danish Theatre since 1997. In 1997 she wrote and performed in the satirical television series Lex og Klatten. In 1998, Steen became an active participant in the Dogme 95 film movement as the only performer to appear in the first three movies: Lars Von Trier's The Idiots, Festen by Thomas Vinterberg, and Søren Kragh-Jacobsen's Mifune's Last Song.

Steen won her first Bodil Award as the Best Supporting Actress in 2000 for Den eneste ene (The One and Only). In 2002, Steen won the Bodil Award, Robert Award and American Film Institute's Grand Jury Prize for her leading role as the controlling loudmouth Nete in Okay. The same year she also won both the Bodil and Robert awards as Best Supporting Actress in Elsker dig for evigt (Open Hearts).

Steen made her directorial debut in with the 2004 tragedy-drama Lad de små børn... (Aftermath) about the emotional trauma of a young couple after the death of their daughter. The film received awards at several film festivals including the Lübeck Nordic Film Days and the Film by the Sea International Festival. In 2007, Steen directed her second feature, the comedy film With Your Permission (Til døden os skiller).

Steen is married to producer Mikael Rieks.

== Filmography ==
=== Actress ===
- Rami og Julie (1988)
- Black Harvest (1993)
- Tre små historier (1993)
- Frække Frida og de frygtløse spioner (1994)
- Frihedens skygge (1994)
- Kun en pige (1995)
- The Biggest Heroes (1996)
- Hannibal & Jerry (1997)
- Festen (1998)
- Kirikou and the Sorceress (1998) (Danish dub)
- The Idiots (1998)
- Den lille ridder (1999)
- The One and Only (1999)
- Solen er så rød (1999)
- Mifune (1999)
- Max (2000)
- Help! I'm a Fish (2000)
- Prop & Berta (2001)
- Okay (2002)
- Open Hearts (2002)
- Drengen der ville gøre det umulige (2002)
- Stealing Rembrandt (2003)
- De drabbade (2003)
- Adam's Apples (2005)
- Snart kommer tiden (2006)
- Vikaren (2007)
- Fear Me Not (2008)
- Applause (2009)
- Everything Will Be Fine (2010)
- Skeletons (2010)
- SuperClásico (2011)
- Keep the Lights On (2012)
- Love Is All You Need (2013)
- Silent Heart (2014)
- Antboy 3 (2016)
- Undercover (2016)
- Modus Séries 2 (2017)
- Below the Surface (2017)
- The City and the City (2018)
- Domino (2019)
- Tove's Room (2023)
- Nightwatch - Demons Are Forever (2023)
- Families like Ours (2024)

=== Director ===
- Aftermath (Lad de små børn) - 2004
- With Your Permission (Til døden os skiller) - 2007
- That Time of Year (Den tid på året) - 2018
- Fathers and Mothers (Fædre & mødre) - 2022

== Awards and nominations ==
Year	Award	Title	Result
2003	Bodil Award for Best Actress	Okay	Won
2012	Bodil Award for Best Actress in a Supporting Role	SuperClásico	Won
2024	Bodil Award for Best Actress	Toves værelse	Won
2003	Robert Award for Best Actress in a Supporting Role	Open Hearts	Won
2003	Robert Award for Best Actress in a Leading Role	Okay	Won
2010	Robert Award for Best Actress in a Leading Role	Applause	Won
2024	Robert Award for Best Actress in a Leading Role	Toves værelse	Won
