= Bodil Award for Best Actress in a Supporting Role =

Annual Danish film award

Bodil Award for Best Supporting Actress
- Awarded for: Best Performance by an Actress in a Supporting Role in a Danish film
- Country: Denmark
- Presented by: Danish Film Critics Association
- First award: 1948
- Website: bodilprisen.dk

The Bodil Award for Best Actress in a Supporting Role (Danish: Bodilprisen for bedste kvindelige birolle) is one of the merit categories presented by the Danish Film Critics Association at the annual Bodil Awards. Created in 1948, it is one of the oldest film awards in Europe, and it honours the best performance by an actor in a supporting role in a Danish produced film. The jury can decide not to hand out the award, which happened numerous times between 1950 and 1985. Since 1986, it has been awarded every year.

== Honorees ==
=== 1940s ===
- 1948: Ellen Gottschalch won for her role in Ta', hvad du vil ha
- 1949: Karin Nellemose won for her role in Mens porten var lukket

=== 1950s ===
- 1950: Not awarded
- 1951: Not awarded
- 1952: Sigrid Neiiendam won for her role in Fra den gamle købmandsgård
- 1953: Not awarded
- 1954: Not awarded
- 1955: Not awarded
- 1956: Not awarded
- 1957: Not awarded
- 1958: Not awarded
- 1959: Not awarded

=== 1960s ===
- 1960: Not awarded
- 1961: Not awarded
- 1962: Not awarded
- 1963: Not awarded
- 1964: Not awarded
- 1965: Not awarded
- 1966: Not awarded
- 1967: Not awarded
- 1968: Not awarded
- 1969: Kirsten Peuliche won for her role in Tænk på et tal

=== 1970s ===
- 1970: Not awarded
- 1971: Not awarded
- 1972: Not awarded
- 1973: Lone Lindorff won for her role in Oh, to Be on the Bandwagon!
- 1974: Not awarded
- 1975: Not awarded
- 1976: Anne-Lise Gabold won for her role as Sylvie in A Happy Divorce
- 1977: Bodil Kjer won for her role as Sabine Lund in Strømer
- 1978: Not awarded
- 1979: Grethe Holmer won for her role as Kirsten's mother in In My Life

=== 1980s ===
- 1980: Berthe Qvistgaard won for her role in Johnny Larsen
- 1981: Helle Fastrup won for her role in Cirkus Casablanca
- 1982: Ghita Nørby won for her role in Pengene eller livet
- 1983: Not awarded
- 1984: Birgitte Raaberg won for her role in In the Middle of the Night
- 1985: Not awarded
- 1986: Catherine Poul Jupont for her role in The Dark Side of the Moon
- 1987: Sofie Gråbøl won for her role in The Wolf at the Door
- 1988: Karen Wegener won for her role in Pelle the Conqueror
- 1989: Tine Miehe-Renard won for her role in Katinka

=== 1990s ===
- 1990: Kirsten Rolffes won for her role in Waltzing Regitze
- 1991: Jannie Faurschou won for her role in Springflod
- 1992: Ditte Gråbøl won for her role in Møv og Funder
- 1993: Birthe Neumann won for her role in Pain of Love
- 1994: Pernille Højmark won for her role in Black Harvest
- 1995: Rikke Louise Andersson won for her role in Nightwatch
- 1996: Anneke von der Lippe won for her role as Eva in Pan
- 1997: Katrin Cartlidge won for her role in Breaking the Waves
- 1998: Birgitte Raaberg won for her role as Judith Petersen in Riget II
- 1999: Anne Louise Hassing won for her role in The Idiots

=== 2000s ===
- 2000: Paprika Steen won for her role as Stella in The One and Only
- 2001: Lene Tiemroth won for her role as Karen's mother in Italian for Beginners
  - Stine Holm Joensen was nominated for her role as Liv in The Bench
  - Sarah Boberg was nominated for her role as Connie in The Bench
- 2002: Susanne Juhasz won for her role as Heidi in One-Hand Clapping
  - Birthe Neumann was nominated for her role as Elly in Chop Chop
- 2003: Paprika Steen won for her role as Maria in Open Hearts
  - Julia Davis was nominated for her role as Moira in Wilbur Wants to Kill Himself
  - Jannie Faurschou was nominated for her role in Minor Mishaps
  - Birthe Neumann was nominated for her role as Hanne in Open Hearts
- 2004: Ditte Gråbøl won for her role in Move Me
  - Bronagh Gallagher was nominated for her role as Sophie in Skagerrak
  - Lisa Werlinder was nominated for her role as Maria in The Inheritance
- 2005: Trine Dyrholm won for her role in In Your Hands
  - Nastja Arcel was nominated for her role as Lone Kjeldsen in King's Game
  - Karen-Lise Mynster was nominated for her role in Aftermath
  - Sonja Richter was nominated for her role in In Your Hands
  - Pia Vieth was nominated for her role in Familien Gregersen
- 2006: Charlotte Fich won for her role as Lisbeth in Manslaughter
  - Anne Sophie Byder was nominated for her role in Murk
  - Tuva Novotny was nominated for her role in Bang Bang Orangutang
  - Pernille Valentin Brandt was nominated for her role as Gunnar in Nordkraft
- 2007: Stine Fischer Christensen won for her role in After the Wedding
  - Mette Riber Christoffersen was nominated for her role in Life Hits
  - Bodil Jørgensen was nominated for her role in Der var engang en dreng
  - Sofie Stougaard was nominated for her role in Lotto
  - Mia Lyhne was nominated for her role in The Boss of It All
- 2008: Charlotte Fich won for her role as Mette in Just Another Love Story
  - Anne Sophie Byder was nominated for her role in White Night
  - Stine Fischer Christensen was nominated for her role in Echo
  - Trine Dyrholm was nominated for her role as Eva in Daisy Diamond
  - Hanne Hedelund was nominated for her role as Mother in The Art of Crying
- 2009: Sarah Boberg won for her role as Karen in Worlds Apart
  - Emma Sehested Høeg was nominated for her role as Selma in Fear Me Not
  - Ghita Nørby was nominated for her role as Sigrid in What No One Knows
  - Paprika Steen was nominated for her role in Fear Me Not

=== 2010s ===
- 2010: Pernille Vallentin won for her role as Scarlett in Deliver Us from Evil
  - Sara Hjort was nominated for her role in Love and Rage
  - Charlotte Fich was nominated for her role in Love and Rage
  - Solbjørg Højfeldt was nominated for her role in The Blessing
  - Lea Høyer was nominated for her role in Above the Street, Below the Water
- 2011: Patricia Schumann won for her role as Sofie in Submarino
  - Marijana Jankovic was nominated for her role as Helena in Everything Will Be Fine
  - Laura Skaarup Jensen was nominated for her role as Karen in The Experiment
  - Rosalinde Mynster was nominated for her role as Julie in Truth About Men
  - Paprika Steen was nominated for her role as Siri in Everything Will Be Fine
- 2012: Paprika Steen won for her role as Anna in SuperClásico
  - Anne Sofie Espersen was nominated for her role as Susan in Rebounce
  - Charlotte Gainsbourg was nominated for her role as Claire in Melancholia
  - Anne Louise Hassing was nominated for her role as Sanne in A Family
  - Charlotte Rampling was nominated for her role as Gaby in Melancholia
- 2013: Frederikke Dahl Hansen won for her role as Maria in You & Me Forever
  - Emilie Kruse was nominated for her role as Christine in You & Me Forever
  - Elsebeth Stentoft was nominated for her role as Ingrid in Teddy Bear
  - Lotte Andersen was nominated for her role in Undskyld jeg forstyrrer
  - Trine Dyrholm was nominated for her role as Juliana Maria of Brunswick-Wolfenbüttel in A Royal Affair
- 2014: Susse Wold won for her role as Grethe in The Hunt
  - Anne Louise Hassing was nominated for her role as Agnes in The Hunt
  - Kristin Scott Thomas was nominated for her role as Crystal in Only God Forgives
  - Sonja Richter was nominated for her role as Merete Lynggaard in The Keeper of Lost Causes
  - Uma Thurman was nominated for her role as Mrs H in Nymphomaniac
- 2015: Susanne Storm won for her role in Klumpfisken
- 2016: Trine Pallesen won for her role as Katrine in Key House Mirror
- 2017: Victoria Carmen Sonne won for her role in In the Blood
- 2018: Julie Christiansen won for her role in Mens vi lever
- 2019: Katrine Greis-Rosenthal won for her role in A Fortunate Man

=== 2020s ===
- 2020: Sofie Torp won for her role in Daniel
- 2021: Sidse Babett Knudsen won for her role in Kød og blod
- 2022: Anne Sofie Wanstrup won for her role in Persona Non Grata
- 2023: Lene Maria Christensen won for her role in Rose (2022 film)
- 2024: Jessica Dinnage won for her role in Unruly

== See also ==
- Robert Award for Best Actress in a Supporting Role
