= Bodil Award for Best Actor in a Supporting Role =

Annual Danish film award

Bodil Award for Best Supporting Actor
- Awarded for: Best Performance by an Actor in a Supporting Role in a Danish film
- Country: Denmark
- Presented by: Danish Film Critics Association
- First award: 1948
- Website: bodilprisen.dk

The Bodil Award for Best Actor in a Supporting Role (Danish: Bodilprisen for bedste mandlige birolle) is one of the merit categories presented by the Danish Film Critics Association at the annual Bodil Awards. Created in 1948, it is one of the oldest film awards in Europe, and it honours the best performance by an actor in a supporting role in a Danish produced film. The jury can decide not to hand out the award, which happened numerous times between 1950 and 1985. Since 1986 it has been awarded every year.

== Honorees ==
=== 1940s ===
- 1948: Ib Schønberg won for his role in Ta', hvad du vil ha'
- 1949: Johannes Meyer won for his role in The Viking Watch of the Danish Seaman

=== 1950s ===
- 1950: Not awarded
- 1951: Preben Lerdorff Rye won for his role in I gabestokken
- 1952: Not awarded
- 1953: Not awarded
- 1954: Not awarded
- 1955: Not awarded
- 1956: Not awarded
- 1957: Not awarded
- 1958: Not awarded
- 1959: Not awarded

=== 1960s ===
- 1960: Not awarded
- 1961: Not awarded
- 1962: Henning Moritzen won for his role as Fyrst Igor in Harry and the Butler
- 1963: Hans W. Petersen won for his role as Victor in Støvsugerbanden
- 1964: Not awarded
- 1965: Not awarded
- 1966: Poul Bundgaard won for his role in Strike First Freddy
- 1967: Kjeld Jacobsen won for his role as the father in Once There Was a War
- 1968: Not awarded
- 1969: Not awarded

=== 1970s ===
- 1970: Preben Kaas won for his role as Dynamit Harry (Frandsen) in The Olsen Gang in a Fix
- 1971: Karl Stegger won for his role as caretaker Frederiksen in Ballade på Christianshavn
- 1972: Jørgen Ryg won for his role as adjutant Mühlhauser in Lenin, You Rascal, You
- 1973: Not awarded
- 1974: Not awarded
- 1975: Jens Okking for his role as Brask in 19 Red Roses
- 1976: Ole Larsen for his role in Den korte sommer
- 1977: Dick Kaysø won for his role as John Bullnes in Strømer
- 1978: Poul Bundgaard won for his role in Hærværk
- 1979: Otto Brandenburg won for his role in Hør, var der ikke en som lo?

=== 1980s ===
- 1980: Frits Helmuth won for his role in Johnny Larsen
- 1981: Kurt Ravn won for his role in Jeppe på bjerget
- 1982: Peter Schrøder won for his role in Rubber Tarzan
- 1983: Arne Hansen won for his role in Der er et yndigt land
- 1984: Hans Chr. Ægidius won for his role in Forræderne
- 1985: Not awarded
- 1986: Ingolf David won for his role in Ofelia kommer til byen
- 1987: Peter Hesse Overgaard won for his role in Cœurs flambés
- 1988: Björn Granath won for his role in Pelle the Conqueror
- 1989: Erik Mørk won for his role in Himmel og helvede

=== 1990s ===
- 1990: Henning Moritzen won for his role in Waltzing Regitze
- 1991: Steen Svare won for his role in Sirup
- 1992: Nikolaj Lie Kaas won for his role in The Boys from St. Petri
- 1993: Waage Sandø won for his role in Pain of Love
- 1994: Jesper Langberg won for his role in Stolen Spring
- 1995: Holger Juul Hansen won for his role as Einar Moesgaard in The Kingdom
- 1996: Lars Knutzon won for his role in Kun en pige
- 1997: Zlatko Burić won for his role as Milo in Pusher
- 1998: Jesper Christensen won for his role in Barbara
- 1999: Nikolaj Lie Kaas won for his role in The Idiots

=== 2000s ===
- 2000: Jesper Asholt won for his role as Rud in Mifune
- 2001: Nicolaj Kopernikus won for his role as Stig in The Bench
  - Henning Moritzen was nominated for his role as The Baron in A Place Nearby
  - Ole Thestrup was nominated for his role as Alfred in Flickering Lights
- 2002: Tommy Kenter won for his role as Anthon in Chop Chop
  - Troels II Munk was nominated for his role as Stromboli in Truly Human
- 2003: Nikolaj Lie Kaas won for his role as Joachim in Open Hearts
  - Jesper Christensen was nominated for his role in Okay
  - Jesper Christensen was nominated for his role in Minor Mishaps
  - Henrik Pripp was nominated for his role in Minor Mishaps
- 2004: Peter Steen won for his role as Niels in The Inheritance
  - Jesper Lohmann was nominated for his role in Lykkevej
  - Nicolas Bro was nominated for his role as Jimmy in Stealing Rembrandt
  - Stellan Skarsgård was nominated for his role as Chuck in Dogville
- 2005: Søren Pilmark won for his role as Erik Dreyer in King's Game
  - Nicolas Bro was nominated for his role as Henrik Moll in King's Game
  - Bent Mejding was nominated for his role as Henrik in Brothers
  - Leif Sylvester Petersen was nominated for his role as Smeden in Pusher II
- 2006: Nicolas Bro won for his role as Morfar in Dark Gorse
  - Lin Kun Wu was nominated for his role as Feng in Kinamand
  - Ali Kazim was nominated for his role as Khalid in Adam's Apples
  - Nicolas Bro was nominated for his role as Gunnar in Adam's Apples
- 2007: Bent Mejding won for his role as Lindum-Svendsen in Drømmen
  - Friðrik Þór Friðriksson was nominated for his role in Direktøren for det hele
  - Jens Jørn Spottag was nominated for his role as Peder in Drømmen
- 2008: Morten Grunwald won for his role in White Night
  - Dejan Čukić was nominated for his role in De unge år
  - Nicolaj Kopernikus was nominated for his role in De fortabte sjæles ø
  - Cyron Melville was nominated for his role as Emil Andersen in Fightgirl Ayse
- 2009: Kim Bodnia won for his role as Jørgen Buhl in Terribly Happy
  - Lars Brygmann was nominated for his role as Dr. Zerlang in Terribly Happy
  - Finn Nielsen was nominated for his role in Lille soldat
  - Henrik Prip was nominated for his role in Spillets regler
  - Jens Jørn Spottag was nominated for his role as Anders Dahl in Worlds Apart

=== 2010s ===
- 2010: Jens Andersen won for his role as Lars in Deliver Us from Evil
  - Michael Falch was nominated for his role as Christian Barfoed in Applause
  - Preben Harris was nominated for his role in Headhunter
  - Henning Moritzen was nominated for his role in Headhunter
  - Søren Pilmark was nominated for his role in Headhunter
- 2011: Kurt Ravn won for his role in Nothing's All Bad
  - Kim Bodnia was nominated for his role as Lars in In a Better World
  - Morten Holst was nominated for his role as Patrick in Brotherhood
  - Gustav Fischer Kjærulff was nominated for his role as Martin in Submarino
  - Roland Møller was nominated for his role as Mureren in R
- 2012: Lars Ranthe won for his role in A Funny Man
  - Pilou Asbæk was nominated for his role in A Family
  - David Dencik was nominated for his role as Martin in Room 304
  - John Hurt was nominated for his role as Dexter in Melancholia
  - Kiefer Sutherland was nominated for his role as John in Melancholia
- 2013: Tommy Kenter won for his role as Lachmann in The Passion of Marie
  - Nicolas Bro was nominated for his role in Undskyld jeg forstyrrer
  - Lars Bom was nominated for his role as Lars Cold in Max Embarrassing 2
  - Thomas W. Gabrielsson was nominated for his role as Schack Carl von Rantzau in A Royal Affair
  - Roland Møller was nominated for his role as Jan Sørensen in A Hijacking
- 2014: Roland Møller won for his role as Bjørn in Nordvest
  - Fares Fares was nominated for his role as Assad in The Keeper of Lost Causes
  - Jamie Bell was nominated for his role as K in Nymphomaniac
  - Thomas Bo Larsen was nominated for his role as Tgeo in The Hunt
- 2015: Pilou Asbæk won for his role in Silent Heart
- 2016: Louis Hofmann won for his role in Land of Mine
- 2017: Lars Mikkelsen won for his role in The Day Will Come
- 2018: Søren Malling won for his role in Den bedste mand
- 2019: Lai Yde Holgaard won for his role in Holiday

=== 2020s ===
- 2020: Gustav Lindh won for his role in Queen of Hearts
- 2021: Lars Brygmann won for his role in Riders of Justice
- 2022: Lars Mikkelsen won for his role in Venuseffekten
- 2023: Ingvar Eggert Sigurdsson won for his role in Godland
- 2024: Elliott Crosset Hove won for his role in Den store stilhed

== See also ==
- Robert Award for Best Actor in a Supporting Role
