= Bodil Award for Best Actress in a Leading Role =

Annual Danish film award

The Bodil Award for Best Actress in a Leading Role (Danish: Bodilprisen for bedste kvindelige hovedrolle) is one of the merit categories presented by the Danish Film Critics Association at the annual Bodil Awards. Created in 1948, it is one of the oldest film awards in Europe, and it honours the best performance by an actress in a leading role in a Danish produced film. The jury can decide not to hand out the award; this has happened 12 times since 1953.

== Honorees ==
=== 1940s ===
- 1948: Bodil Kjer won for her role as Jenny Christensen in Jenny and the Soldier
- 1949: Karin Nellemose won for her role as Thyra Sabroe in Kampen mod uretten

=== 1950s ===
- 1950: Astrid Villaume won for her role as Susanne Drewes in Susanne
- 1951: Not awarded
- 1952: Bodil Kjer won for her role as Musen Polyhymnia in Mød mig på Cassiopeia
- 1953: Not awarded
- 1954: Tove Maës won for her role as in Himlen er blaa
- 1955: Birgitte Federspiel won for her role as Inger Borgen in Ordet
- 1956: Sigrid Horne-Rasmussen won for her role as Helga Nielsen in Altid ballade
- 1957: Birgit Sadolin won for her role as Johanne 'Joe' Hansen in Tre piger fra Jylland
- 1958: Clara Pontoppidan won for her role as Enkefru Tang in En kvinde er overflødig
- 1959: Birgitte Federspiel won for her role as Vibeke in En fremmed banker på

=== 1960s ===
- 1960: Bodil Ipsen won for her role as Bedstemor Gunhild in Tro, håb og trolddom
- 1961: Lise Ringheim won for her role as Eva Sørensen in Den sidste vinter
- 1962: Not awarded
- 1963: Helle Virkner won for her role as Emilie in Den kære familie
- 1964: Laila Andersson won for her role as Gudrun in Gudrun
- 1965: Lone Hertz won for her role as Tine Bølling in Tine
- 1966: Not awarded
- 1967: Lone Hertz won for her role as Lene in Utro
- 1968: Harriet Andersson won for her role as Sofia Persson in Mennesker mødes og sød musik opstår i hjertet
- 1969: Not awarded

=== 1970s ===
- 1970: Anne-Lise Gabold won for her role as Vera Bagger in Jazz All Around
- 1971: Tove Maës won for her role as Gerda Knudsen in Det er nat med fru Knudsen
- 1972: Not awarded
- 1973: Lotte Tarp won for her role as Birthe Kold in Farlige kys
- 1974: Not awarded
- 1975: Agneta Ekmanner won for her role as Marianne Lorentzen in Per
- 1976: Ghita Nørby won for her role as Kirsten in Den korte sommer
- 1977: Not awarded
- 1978: Not awarded
- 1979: Kirsten Olesen won for her role as Kirsten in In My Life

=== 1980s ===
- 1980: Not awarded
- 1981: Karen Lykkehus won for her role as Dagmar Larsen in Next Stop Paradise
- 1982: Solbjørg Højfeldt won for her role as Karen in Slingrevalsen
- 1983: Tove Maës won for her role as Inger Marie Maage in Felix
- 1984: Line Arlien-Søborg won for her role as Mette in Beauty and the Beast
- 1985: Not awarded
- 1986: Stine Bierlich won for her role as Molly in Ofelia kommer til byen
- 1987: Kirsten Lehfeldt won for her role as Henriette 'Henry in Cœurs flambés
- 1988: Not awarded
- 1989: Karina Skands won for her role as Maria in Himmel og helvede

=== 1990s ===
- 1990: Ghita Nørby won for her role as Regitze in Waltzing Regitze
- 1991: Trine Dyrholm won for her role as Pauline in Springflod
- 1992: Ghita Nørby won for her role as Rosha Cohen in Freud Leaving Home
- 1993: Anne Louise Hassing won for her role as Kirsten in Pain of Love
- 1994: Sofie Gråbøl won for her role as Clara Uldahl-Ege in Black Harvest
- 1995: Kirsten Rolffes won for her role as Sigrid Drusse in The Kingdom
- 1996: Puk Scharbau won for her role as Lise (20-30 years) in Kun en pige
  - Michelle Bjørn-Andersen was nominated for her role as Frederik's mother in Menneskedyret
  - Charlotte Sieling was nominated for her role as Hannah in Elsker elsker ikke...
- 1997: Emily Watson won for her role as Bess McNeill in Breaking the Waves
- 1998: Sidse Babett Knudsen won for her role as Julie in Let's Get Lost
  - Amalie Dollerup was nominated for her role as Johanne in Nonnebørn
  - Anneke von der Lippe was nominated for her role as Barbara in Barbara
- 1999: Bodil Jørgensen won for her role as Karen in The Idiots

=== 2000s ===
- 2000: Sidse Babett Knudsen won for her role as Sus in The One and Only
- 2001: Björk won for her role as Selma in Dancer in the Dark
- 2002: Stine Stengade won for her role as Kira in Kira's Reason: A Love Story
- 2003: Paprika Steen won for her role as Nete in Okay
- 2004: Birthe Neumann won for her role as Sara in Move Me
- 2005: Connie Nielsen won for her role in Brothers
- 2006: Trine Dyrholm won for her role as My Larsen in Fluerne på væggen
- 2007: Trine Dyrholm won for her role as Charlotte in A Soap
- 2008: Noomi Rapace won for her role in Daisy Diamond
- 2009: Lene Maria Christensen won for her role in Terribly Happy

=== 2010s ===
- 2010: Charlotte Gainsbourg won for her role as She in Antichrist
  - Lærke Winther Andersen was nominated for her role as Katrine in The Blessing
  - Stephanie León was nominated for her role as Charlotte in Hush Little Baby
  - Malou Reymann was nominated for her role as Barbara in Se min kjole
  - Paprika Steen was nominated for her role as Thea Barfoed in Applause
- 2011: Trine Dyrholm won for her role as Marianne in Hævnen
  - Julie Brochorst Andersen was nominated for her role as Sara in Hold Me Tight
  - Ellen Hillingsø was nominated for her role as Nurse Gert in Eksperimentet
  - Bodil Jørgensen was nominated for her role as Ingeborg in Smukke mennesker
  - Mille Lehfeldt was nominated for her role in Smukke mennesker
- 2012: Lene Maria Christensen won for her role as Ditte in En familie
  - Frederikke Dahl Hansen was nominated for her role as Louise in Frit fald
  - Kirsten Dunst was nominated for her role as Justine in Melancholia
  - Emma Sehested Høeg was nominated for her role as Lina in Magi i luften
- 2013: Sara Hjort Ditlevsen won for her role as Helene in Undskyld jeg forstyrrer
  - Trine Dyrholm was nominated for her role as Ida in Den skaldede frisør
  - Alicia Vikander was nominated for her role as Caroline Matilda of Great Britain in En kongelig affære
  - Bodil Jørgensen was nominated for her role as Gudrun Fiil in Hvidsten gruppen
  - Julie Brochorst Andersen was nominated for her role as Laura in You & Me Forever
- 2014: Charlotte Gainsbourg won for her role as Joe in Nymphomaniac
  - Sofie Gråbøl was nominated for her role as Helen in The Hour of the Lynx
  - Stacy Martin was nominated for her role as Young Joe in Nymphomaniac
  - Helle Fagralíð was nominated for her role as Signe in Sorrow and Joy
- 2015: Danica Curcic won for her role in Silent Heart
- 2016: Mille Lehfeldt won for her role as Ellen in Lang historie kort
- 2017: Trine Dyrholm won for her role in The Commune
- 2018: Amanda Collin won for her role in En frygtelig kvinde
- 2019: Victoria Carmen Sonne won for her role in Holiday

=== 2020s ===
- 2020: Trine Dyrholm won for her role in Queen of Hearts
- 2021: Kaya Toft Loholt won for her role in A Perfectly Normal Family
- 2022: Birthe Neumann won for her role in Pagten
- 2023: Sofie Gråbøl won for her role in Rose
- 2024: Paprika Steen won for her role in Toves værelse

== See also ==
- Robert Award for Best Actress in a Leading Role
