= Bodil Award for Best Danish Film =

Danish film award

The Bodil Award for Best Danish Film (Danish: Bodilprisen for bedste danske film) is one of the categories for the Bodil Awards presented annually by the Danish Film Critics Association. It was created in 1948 and is one of the oldest film prizes in Europe. The jury can decide not to give out the award if no deserving films are submitted. This has occurred once, in 1974. More than one film also can receive the award in a single year, as occurred in 1955.

== Honorees ==
=== 1940s ===
- 1948: Jenny and the Soldier directed by Johan Jacobsen
- 1949: The Viking Watch of the Danish Seaman directed by Bodil Ipsen and Lau Lauritzen Jr.

=== 1950s ===
- 1950: Susanne directed by Torben Anton Svendsen
- 1951: Café Paradis directed by Bodil Ipsen and Lau Lauritzen Jr.
- 1952: Det Sande Ansigt directed by Bodil Ipsen and Lau Lauritzen, Jr.
- 1953: Adam and Eve directed by Erik Balling
- 1954: Farlig Ungdom directed by Lau Lauritzen, Jr.
- 1955: Ordet directed by Carl Theodor Dreyer and Der kom en dag directed by Sven Methling
- 1956: På tro og love directed by Torben Anton Svendsen
- 1957: Be Dear to Me directed by Annelise Hovmand
- 1958: Bundfald directed by Palle Kjærulff-Schmidt and Robert Saaskin
- 1959: A Stranger Knocks directed by Johan Jacobsen

=== 1960s ===
- 1960: Vi er allesammen tossede directed by Sven Methling
- 1961: The Last Winter directed by Edvin Tiemroth and Anker Sørensen
- 1962: Harry and the Butler directed by Bent Christensen
- 1963: Weekend directed by Palle Kjærulff-Schmidt
- 1964: Street Without End directed by Mogens Vemmer
- 1965: Gertrud directed by Carl Theodor Dreyer
- 1966: Strike First Freddy directed by Erik Balling
- 1967: Hunger directed by Henning Carlsen
- 1968: People Meet and Sweet Music Fills the Heart directed by Henning Carlsen
- 1969: Ballad of Carl-Henning directed by Sven and Lene Grønlykke

=== 1970s ===
- 1970: Jazz All Around directed by Knud Leif Thomsen
- 1971: Ang.: Lone directed by Franz Ernst
- 1972: The Missing Clerk directed by Gert Fredholm
- 1973: The Escape directed by Hans Kristensen
- 1974: Not awarded
- 1975: Lars-Ole 5.c directed by Nils Malmros
- 1976: That Brief Summer directed by Edward Fleming
- 1977: Boys directed by Nils Malmros
- 1978: Me and Charly directed by Morten Arnfred and Henning Kristiansen
- 1979: In My Life directed by Bille August

=== 1980s ===
- 1980: Johnny Larsen directed by Morten Arnfred
- 1981: Jeppe på bjerget directed by Kaspar Rostrup
- 1982: Rubber Tarzan directed by Søren Kragh-Jacobsen
- 1983: Der er et yndigt land directed by Morten Arnfred
- 1984: Beauty and the Beast directed by Nils Malmros
- 1985: The Element of Crime directed by Lars von Trier
- 1986: The Dark Side of the Moon directed by Erik Clausen
- 1987: Cœurs flambés directed by Helle Ryslinge
- 1988: Pelle the Conqueror directed by Bille August
- 1989: Emma's Shadow directed by Søren Kragh-Jacobsen

=== 1990s ===
- 1990: Waltzing Regitze directed by Kaspar Rostrup
- 1991: Dance of the Polar Bears directed by Birger Larsen
- 1992: Europa directed by Lars von Trier
- 1993: Pain of Love directed by Nils Malmros
- 1994: Fish Out of Water directed by Erik Clausen
- 1995: The Kingdom directed by Lars von Trier
- 1996: The Beast Within directed by Carsten Rudolf
- 1997: Breaking the Waves directed by Lars von Trier
- 1998: Let's Get Lost directed by Jonas Elmer
- 1999: The Celebration directed by Thomas Vinterberg

=== 2000s ===
- 2000: The One and Only directed by Susanne Bier
  - Bleeder directed by Nicolas Winding Refn
  - Magnetisørens femte vinter directed by Morten Henriksen
  - Mifune directed by Søren Kragh-Jacobsen
  - Bornholms voice directed by Lotte Svendsen
- 2001: The Bench directed by Per Fly
  - Flickering Lights directed by Anders Thomas Jensen
  - Dancer in the Dark directed by Lars von Trier
  - Italian for Beginners directed by Lone Scherfig
  - Miracle directed by Natasha Arthy
- 2002: Kira's Reason: A Love Story directed by Ole Christian Madsen
  - A Song for Martin directed by Bille August
  - Family directed by Sami Saif and Phie Ambo
  - One-Hand Clapping directed by Gert Fredholm
  - Truly Human directed by Åke Sandgren
- 2003: Open Hearts directed by Susanne Bier
  - Okay directed by Jesper W. Nielsen
  - Facing the Truth directed by Nils Malmros
  - Minor Mishaps directed by Annette K. Olesen
  - Wilbur Wants to Kill Himself directed by Lone Scherfig
- 2004: Dogville directed by Lars von Trier
  - Reconstruction directed by Christoffer Boe
  - Bagland directed by Anders Gustafsson
  - Stealing Rembrandt directed by Jannik Johansen
  - The Inheritance directed by Per Fly
- 2005: King's Game directed by Nikolaj Arcel
  - Brothers directed by Susanne Bier
  - In Your Hands directed by Annette K. Olesen
  - Pusher II directed by Nicolas Winding Refn
  - Terkel in Trouble directed by Fjeldmark/Vestbjerg Andersen/Christoffersen
- 2006: Manslaughter directed by Per Fly
  - Adam's Apples directed by Anders Thomas Jensen
  - Angels in Fast Motion directed by Ole Christian Madsen
  - Manderlay directed by Lars von Trier
  - Murk directed by Jannik Johansen
- 2007: A Soap directed by Pernille Fischer Christensen
  - We Shall Overcome directed by Niels Arden Oplev
  - After the Wedding directed by Susanne Bier
  - Life Hits directed by Christian E. Christiansen
  - Prague directed by Ole Christian Madsen
- 2008: The Art of Crying directed by Peter Schønau Fog
  - AFR directed by Morten Hartz Kaplers
  - Fightgirl Ayse directed by Nathasha Arthy
  - White Night directed by Jannik Johansen
- 2009: Terribly Happy directed by Henrik Ruben Genz
  - Flame & Citron directed by Ole Christian Madsen
  - Go With Peace, Jamil directed by Omar Shargawi
  - Little Soldier directed by Annette K. Olesen
  - Worlds Apart directed by Niels Arden Oplev

=== 2010s ===
- 2010: Antichrist directed by Lars von Trier
  - Aching Hearts directed by Nils Malmros
  - Applause directed by Martin Zandvliet
  - Headhunter directed by Rumle Hammerich
  - Oldboys directed by Nikolaj Steen
- 2011: R directed by Michael Noer and Tobias Lindholm
  - Clown directed by Mikkel Nørgaard
  - In a Better World directed by Susanne Bier
  - Submarino directed by Thomas Vinterberg
- 2012: Melancholia directed by Lars von Trier
  - A Family directed by Pernille Fischer Christensen
  - A Funny Man directed by Martin Zandvliet
  - Rebounce directed by Heidi Maria Faisst
  - SuperClásico directed by Ole Christian Madsen
- 2013: A Hijacking directed by Tobias Lindholm
  - A Royal Affair directed by Nikolaj Arcel
  - Excuse Me directed by Henrik Ruben Genz
  - Teddy Bear directed by Mads Matthiesen
  - You & Me Forever directed by Kaspar Munk
- 2014: The Hunt directed by Thomas Vinterberg
  - Nymphomaniac directed by Lars von Trier
  - Sorrow and Joy directed by Nils Malmros
  - Nordvest directed by Michael Noer
  - The Keeper of Lost Causes directed by Mikkel Nørgaard
- 2015: Silent Heart directed by Bille August
  - All Inclusive directed by Hella Joof
  - Speed Walking directed by Niels Arden Oplev
  - The Sunfish directed by Søren Balle
  - When Animals Dream directed by Jonas Alexander Arnby
- 2016: Land of Mine directed by Martin Zandvliet
  - The Idealist directed by Christina Rosendahl
  - Bridgend directed by Jeppe Rønde
  - Sommeren '92 directed by Kasper Barfoed
  - A War directed by Tobias Lindholm
- 2017: In the Blood directed by Rasmus Heisterberg
  - The Commune directed by Thomas Vinterberg
  - Parents directed by Christian Tafdrup
  - Shelley directed by Ali Abbasi
  - The Neon Demon directed by Nicolas Winding Refn
- 2018: Winter Brothers directed by Hlynur Pálmason
  - Team Hurricane directed by Annika Berg
  - Darkland directed by Fenar Ahmad
  - Mens vi lever directed by Mehdi Avaz
  - A Terrible Woman directed by Christian Tafdrup
- 2019: Holiday directed by Isabella Eklöf
  - The Guilty directed by Gustav Möller
  - That Time of Year directed by Paprika Steen
  - Ditte & Louise directed by Niclas Bendixen
  - Checkered Ninja directed by Anders Matthesen and Thorbjørn Christoffersen

=== 2020s ===
- 2020: Queen of Hearts directed by May el-Toukhy
  - Uncle directed by René Frelle Petersen
  - Before the Frost directed by Michael Noer
  - De frivillige directed by Frederikke Aspöck
  - Cutterhead directed by Rasmus Kloster Bro
- 2021: Another Round directed by Thomas Vinterberg
  - A Perfectly Normal Family directed by Malou Reymann
  - Riders of Justice directed by Anders Thomas Jensen
  - Shorta directed by Anders Ølholm and Frederik Louis Hviid
  - The Good Traitor directed by Christina Rosendahl
- 2022: Hvor kragerne vender directed by Lisa Jespersen
  - Margrete: Queen of the North directed by Charlotte Sieling
  - A Taste of Hunger directed by Christoffer Boe
  - Ternet Ninja 2 directed by Anders Matthesen
  - Venuseffekten directed by Anna Emma Haudal
- 2023: Resten af livet directed by Frelle Petersen
  - Godland directed by Hlynur Pálmason
  - Speak No Evil directed by Christian Tafdrup
  - Du som er i himlen directed by Tea Lindeburg
  - Holy Spider directed by Ali Abbasi

== See also ==
- Robert Award for Best Danish Film
