= Bodil Honorary Award =

Annual Danish film award

The Bodil Honorary Award (Danish: Æres-Bodil, Honorary Bodil) is one of the special awards at the annual Danish Bodil Awards presented by the Danish Film Critics Association. It was awarded for the first time at the 2nd Bodil Awards in 1949, and pro re nata until 1997, since when it has been awarded annually.

== Honorees ==
=== 1940s ===
- 1949: Cinematographer Annelise Reenberg for shooting Kristinus Bergman

=== 1950s ===
- 1951: Former Minister of Finance H. C. Hansen for having lowered taxes on film
- 1953: Cinematographer Kjeld Arnholtz for shooting The Crime of Tove Andersen
- 1958: Composer Sven Gyldmark for the music to Bundfald
- 1959: Charlie Chaplin

=== 1960s ===
- 1960: Cinematographer Henning Bendtsen for shooting Paw (1959)
- 1961: Actor Dirch Passer because he "with a great talent has let himself be abused by Danish producers, and in the hope that he will soon get a part that will match his talent"
- 1964: Cinematographer Henning Kristiansen for shooting Hvad med os? (1963) and School for Suicide (1964)
- 1966: Cinema Director Carl Thorvald Larsen for his excellent way to run the Alexandra Cinema
- 1967: Cinema Director Peter Refn for artistic and worthwhile repertoire at the Grand Theatre and the import of quality films
- 1968: Cinema Director Ove Brusendorff for the good repertoire in Carlton Cinema
- 1969: Cinema Director Peter Refn for importing Satyajit Ray's Indian masterpiece Pather Panchali

=== 1970s ===
- 1970: Film historian and handbook editor Bjørn Rasmussen for his five-volume encyclopaedia Filmens Hvem Hvad Hvor (The Who What and Where of Films)
- 1971: Cinematographer Henning Camre for shooting Giv Gud en chance om søndagen
- 1971: Cartoon Directors Flemming Quist Møller and Jannik Hastrup for the animated feature Benny's Bathtub
- 1972: Cinematographer Carsten Behrendt-Poulsen for shooting Lenin, You Rascal, You (1972)
- 1972: Film Editor Christian Hartkopp for good editing
- 1974: Special Effects Designer Henning Bahs for special effects
- 1976: Cinematographer Mikael Salomon, lifetime achievement award
- 1977: Cinematographer Dirk Brüel, lifetime achievement award
- 1978: Cinematographer Alexander Gruszynski for shooting the documentary Jenny (1977)

=== 1980s ===
- 1982: Cinematographer Dan Laustsen for shooting Rubber Tarzan (1981)
- 1983: Cinematographer Jan Weincke for shooting Tree of Knowledge (1981) and Zappa (1983)
- 1984: Film Importer Jan Vedersø from cinema 'Klaptræet' for quality imports
- 1985: Film Producer Per Holst for his excellent work on Kærne Film and import of Wim Wenders' Paris, Texas (1984)
- 1986: Set Designer Leif Sylvester Petersen for production design on The Dark Side of the Moon (1986)
- 1988: Animation Director Jannik Hastrup, lifetime achievement award for his total production

=== 1990s ===
- 1992: Film Editor Ghita Beckendorff for her work as editor
- 1993: Director Erik Balling, lifetime achievement award because "popular culture and quality are not two contradictory concepts"
- 1994: Animation Director Flemming Quist Møller, lifetime achievement award for his many animated films, including Jungledyret Hugo
- 1995: Screenwriter Niels Vørsel, lifetime achievement award for his work as a screenwriter, including The Kingdom
- 1997: Actress Bodil Kjer, lifetime achievement award
- 1998: Film Composer Joachim Holbek, lifetime achievement award for his work as a composer
- 1999: Actor Ove Sprogøe, lifetime achievement award "for his efforts and long career in the Danish film"

=== 2000s ===
- 2000: Actress Marguerite Viby, lifetime achievement award
- 2001: Film producers Peter Aalbæk Jensen, Ib Tardini, and Vibeke Windeløv for their and Zentropa's great importance to Danish film development through the 90s
- 2002: Film Critic Morten Piil og Film Historian Peter Schepelern for their longstanding contribution to Danish film literature
- 2003: Screenwriters Kim Fupz Aakeson, Anders Thomas Jensen, and Mogens Rukov, lifetime achievement awards for their screenplays
- 2004: Anders Refn, lifetime achievement award for his work as a director, assistant director, editor etc.
- 2005: Film Editor Janus Billeskov Jansen, lifetime achievement award for his work as an editor for several decades and as a consultant editor for a number of new directors and film editors
- 2006: Kim Foss and Andreas Steinmann for their work with NatFilm Festival
- 2007: Actress Helle Virkner, lifetime achievement award
- 2008: Ib Monty, Marguerite Engberg, and Niels Jensen for their pioneering efforts for Danish film history, film studies, and film distribution
- 2009: Director Jørgen Leth, lifetime achievement award for his documentary work through the ages

=== 2010s ===
- 2010: Carsten Myllerup, Linda Krogsøe Holmberg, and Jens Mikkelsen for founding the alternative film school Super16
- 2011: Actor Henning Moritzen, lifetime achievement award
- 2012: Actress Ghita Nørby, lifetime achievement award
- 2013: Composer Bent Fabricius-Bjerre, lifetime achievement award
- 2014: Actor Jesper Langberg, lifetime achievement award
- 2015: Danish American actor Viggo Mortensen, lifetime achievement award
- 2016: Anna Karina, lifetime achievement award
- 2017: Henning Jensen, lifetime achievement award
- 2018: Lone Scherfig for her impressive career as a director
- 2019: Arne Bro for his work as the head of the documentary line at the National Film School of Denmark

=== 2020s ===
- 2020: Michael Wikke and Steen Rasmussen for their great efforts for Danish family film
- 2021: The Danish cinemas, for their efforts after a historically difficult year of shutdown due to the covid-19 pandemic
- 2022: Susanne Bier
- 2023: Erik Clausen
- 2024: Anne Wivel
- 2025: Lars von Trier for his pioneering work as a director and screenwriter over five decades

== See also ==
- Robert Honorary Award
