= Bodil Award for Best Non-English Language Film =

Annual Danish film award

The Bodil Award for Best Non-English Language Film is one of the categories for the Bodil Awards presented annually by the Danish Union of Film Critics (Danish: Filmedarbejderforeningen). It was created in 1948 and is one of the oldest film prizes in Europe. This category was called "Best European Film'" until 2001, when it became the "Best Non-American Film". The award obtained its current name in 2024.

== Honorees ==
=== 1940s ===
- 1948: A Matter of Life and Death directed by Michael Powell and Emeric Pressburger
- 1949: Hamlet directed by Laurence Olivier

=== 1950s ===
- 1950: The Third Man directed by Carol Reed
- 1951: Bicycle Thieves directed by Vittorio De Sica
- 1952: The Browning Version directed by Anthony Asquith
- 1953: Only a Mother directed by Alf Sjöberg
- 1954: Forbidden Games directed by René Clément
- 1955: Umberto D. directed by Vittorio De Sica
- 1956: La Strada directed by Federico Fellini
- 1957: Smiles of a Summer Night directed by Ingmar Bergman
- 1958: Gates of Paris directed by René Clair
- 1959: Wild Strawberries directed by Ingmar Bergman

=== 1960s ===
- 1960: 400 Blows directed by François Truffaut
- 1961: Ballad of a Soldier directed by Grigory Chukhray
- 1962: Rocco and His Brothers directed by Luchino Visconti
- 1963: Jules and Jim directed by François Truffaut
- 1964: 8½ directed by Federico Fellini and Dr. Strangelove directed by Stanley Kubrick
- 1965: The Soft Skin directed by François Truffaut
- 1966: The Rules of the Game directed by Jean Renoir
- 1967: Loves of a Blonde directed by Miloš Forman
- 1968: Belle de Jour directed by Luis Buñuel
- 1969: Playtime directed by Jacques Tati

=== 1970s ===
- 1970: Adalen Riots directed by Bo Widerberg
- 1971: Le Boucher directed by Claude Chabrol
- 1972: Death in Venice directed by Luchino Visconti
- 1973: The New Land directed by Jan Troell
- 1974: Cries and Whispers directed by Ingmar Bergman
- 1975: Amarcord directed by Federico Fellini
- 1976: The Passenger directed by Michelangelo Antonioni
- 1977: 1900 directed by Bernardo Bertolucci
- 1978: Providence directed by Alain Resnais
- 1979: Autumn Sonata directed by Ingmar Bergman

=== 1980s ===
- 1980: The Tin Drum directed by Volker Schlöndorff
- 1981: Max Havelaar directed by Fons Rademakers
- 1982: The French Lieutenant's Woman directed by Karel Reisz
- 1983: The Simple-Minded Murderer directed by Hans Alfredson
- 1984: Carmen directed by Carlos Saura
- 1985: Paris, Texas directed by Wim Wenders
- 1986: Ran directed by Akira Kurosawa
- 1987: My Life as a Dog directed by Lasse Hallström
- 1988: Round Midnight directed by Bertrand Tavernier
- 1989: Au revoir les enfants directed by Louis Malle

=== 1990s ===
- 1990: A Short Film About Killing directed by Krzysztof Kieślowski
- 1991: Dekalog directed by Krzysztof Kieślowski
- 1992: Life Is Sweet directed by Mike Leigh
- 1993: Howards End directed by James Ivory
- 1994: Not awarded
- 1995: Three Colours: Red directed by Krzysztof Kieślowski
- 1996: Lamerica directed by Gianni Amelio
- 1997: Trainspotting directed by Danny Boyle
- 1998: The Full Monty directed by Peter Cattaneo
- 1999: My Name Is Joe directed by Ken Loach

=== 2000s ===
- 2000: All About My Mother directed by Pedro Almodóvar
- 2001: Crouching Tiger, Hidden Dragon directed by Ang Lee
- 2002: Songs from the Second Floor directed by Roy Andersson
- 2003: Talk to Her directed by Pedro Almodóvar
- 2004: Good Bye, Lenin! directed by Wolfgang Becker
- 2005: Look at Me directed by Agnès Jaoui
- 2006: Downfall directed by Oliver Hirschbiegel
- 2007: The Lives of Others directed by Florian Henckel von Donnersmarck
- 2008: Pan's Labyrinth directed by Guillermo del Toro
- 2009: Let the Right One In directed by Tomas Alfredson

=== 2010s ===
- 2010: Waltz with Bashir directed by Ari Folman
- 2011: The White Ribbon directed by Michael Haneke
- 2012: A Separation directed by Asghar Farhadi
- 2013: Amour directed by Michael Haneke
- 2014: Blue Is the Warmest Colour directed by Abdellatif Kechiche
- 2015: Force Majeure directed by Ruben Östlund
- 2016: Mommy directed by Xavier Dolan
- 2017: Toni Erdmann directed by Maren Ade
- 2018: The Square directed by Ruben Östlund
- 2019: Roma directed by Alfonso Cuarón

=== 2020s ===
- 2020: Parasite directed by Bong Joon-ho
- 2021: Portrait of a Lady on Fire directed by Céline Sciamma
- 2022: The Power of the Dog directed by Jane Campion
- 2023: The Worst Person in the World directed by Joachim Trier
- 2024: Close directed by Lukas Dhont
- 2025: The Zone of Interest directed by Jonathan Glazer
- 2026: Dreams (Sex Love) directed by Dag Johan Haugerud

== See also ==
- Robert Award for Best Non-American Film
