= Bodil Award for Best English Language Film =

Annual Danish film award

The Bodil Award for Best English Language Film is one of the categories for the Bodil Awards presented annually by the Danish Union of Film Critics (Danish: Filmedarbejderforeningen). It was created in 1948 and is one of the oldest film prizes in Europe. The category was named "Best American Film" until 1961, when it became the "Best Non-European Film". In 2001, the name of the award changed back to "Best American Film", and the European category was changed to "Best Non-American Film". The award was given its current name in 2024.

The judging committee may choose not to present an award if there isn't a worthy film. This has happened twice: In 1957, when American producers boycotted Denmark; and in 1964, when two Bodils were awarded to European films.

== Honorees ==
=== 1940s ===
- 1948: The Best Years of Our Lives directed by William Wyler
- 1949: Monsieur Verdoux directed by Charles Chaplin

=== 1950s ===
- 1950: The Snake Pit directed by Anatole Litvak
- 1951: Sunset Boulevard directed by Billy Wilder
- 1952: All About Eve directed by Joseph L. Mankiewicz
- 1953: High Noon directed by Fred Zinnemann
- 1954: Julius Caesar by Joseph L. Mankiewicz
- 1955: On the Waterfront directed by Elia Kazan
- 1956: Marty directed by Delbert Mann
- 1957: Not awarded
- 1958: East of Eden directed by Elia Kazan
- 1959: The Defiant Ones directed by Stanley Kramer

=== 1960s ===
- 1960: 12 Angry Men directed by Sidney Lumet
- 1961: The Young One directed by Luis Buñuel
- 1962: Judgment at Nuremberg directed by Stanley Kramer
- 1963: The Exterminating Angel directed by Luis Buñuel
- 1964: Not awarded
- 1965: Seven Days in May directed by John Frankenheimer
- 1966: The Pawnbroker directed by Sidney Lumet
- 1967: Aparajito directed by Satyajit Ray
- 1968: Bonnie and Clyde directed by Arthur Penn
- 1969: Pather Panchali directed by Satyajit Ray

=== 1970s ===
- 1970: Midnight Cowboy directed by John Schlesinger
- 1971: Tell Them Willie Boy Is Here directed by Abraham Polonsky
- 1972: Taking Off directed by Miloš Forman
- 1973: Cabaret directed by Bob Fosse
- 1974: Scarecrow directed by Jerry Schatzberg
- 1975: Chinatown directed by Roman Polanski
- 1976: One Flew Over the Cuckoo's Nest directed by Miloš Forman
- 1977: Nashville directed by Robert Altman
- 1978: Annie Hall directed by Woody Allen
- 1979: An Unmarried Woman directed by Paul Mazursky

=== 1980s ===
- 1980: Manhattan directed by Woody Allen
- 1981: All That Jazz directed by Bob Fosse
- 1982: The Four Seasons directed by Alan Alda
- 1983: Tootsie directed by Sydney Pollack
- 1984: Zelig directed by Woody Allen
- 1985: The Right Stuff directed by Philip Kaufman
- 1986: The Purple Rose of Cairo directed by Woody Allen
- 1987: Hannah and Her Sisters directed by Woody Allen
- 1988: Down by Law directed by Jim Jarmusch
- 1989: The Dead directed by John Huston

=== 1990s ===
- 1990: Dangerous Liaisons directed by Stephen Frears
- 1991: Goodfellas directed by Martin Scorsese
- 1992: Thelma & Louise directed by Ridley Scott
- 1993: The Player directed by Robert Altman
- 1994: The Age of Innocence directed by Martin Scorsese and The Piano directed by Jane Campion
- 1995: Short Cuts directed by Robert Altman
- 1996: Smoke directed by Wayne Wang
- 1997: Fargo directed by Joel Coen
- 1998: L.A. Confidential directed by Curtis Hanson
- 1999: The Ice Storm directed by Ang Lee

=== 2000s ===
- 2000: The Straight Story directed by David Lynch
- 2001: American Beauty directed by Sam Mendes
- 2002: The Lord of the Rings: The Fellowship of the Ring directed by Peter Jackson
- 2003: Mulholland Drive directed by David Lynch
- 2004: Bowling for Columbine directed by Michael Moore
- 2005: Lost in Translation directed by Sofia Coppola
- 2006: A History of Violence directed by David Cronenberg
- 2007: Babel directed by Alejandro González Iñárritu
- 2008: Letters from Iwo Jima directed by Clint Eastwood
- 2009: There Will Be Blood directed by Paul Thomas Anderson

=== 2010s ===
- 2010: Up directed by Pete Docter
- 2011: A Single Man directed by Tom Ford
- 2012: Winter's Bone directed by Debra Granik
- 2013: Martha Marcy May Marlene directed by Sean Durkin
- 2014: Beasts of the Southern Wild directed by Benh Zeitlin
- 2015: Boyhood directed by Richard Linklater
- 2016: Birdman directed by Alejandro González Iñárritu
- 2017: The Revenant directed by Alejandro González Iñárritu
- 2018: La La Land directed by Damien Chazelle
- 2019: The Florida Project directed by Sean S. Baker

=== 2020s ===
- 2020: Marriage Story directed by Noah Baumbach
- 2021: The Lighthouse directed by Robert Eggers
- 2022: Nomadland directed by Chloe Zhao
- 2023: C'mon C'mon directed by Mike Mills
- 2024: Aftersun directed by Charlotte Wells

== See also ==
- Robert Award for Best American Film
