= Henning Bahs Award =

Annual Danish film award

The Henning Bahs Award (Danish: Henning Bahs-prisen) is a film award established in 2012 by the Danish Film Critics Association in collaboration with the Association of Danish Scenographers (Danish: Sammenslutningen af Danske Scenografer) in honour of the Danish screenwriter and special effects designer Henning Bahs. It is given for excellence in production design and presented at the annual Bodil Awards-ceremony.

== Recipients ==
- 2012: Charlotte Bay Garnov and Peter Grant for A Funny Man
- 2013: Niels Sejer for A Royal Affair
- 2014: Rasmus Thjellesen for The Keeper of Lost Causes
- 2015: Rie Lykke for Speed Walking
- 2016: Mia Stensgaard for Men & Chicken (Mænd og Høns)
- 2017: Jette Lehmann for Forældre
- 2018: Thomas Bremer and Nikolaj Danielsen for QEDA
- 2019: Simone Grau Roney for The House That Jack Built
- 2020: Josephine Farsø for Harpiks
- 2021: Rie Lykke for Vores mand i Amerika
- 2022: Søren Schwarzberg for Margrete: Queen of the North

== See also ==
- Robert Award for Best Production Design
