= 51st Bodil Awards =

1998 Danish film awards ceremony

- Date: 1998
- Site: Imperial Theatre, Copenhagen

Highlights
- Best Film: Let's Get Lost
- Most awards: Let's Get Lost & The Kingdom II (2)

The 51st Bodil Awards ceremony was held in 1998 in Copenhagen, Denmark, honouring the best national and foreign films of 1997. Let's Get Lost directed by Jonas Elmer won the award for Best Danish Film.

== Winners ==
Best Danish Film	Best Danish Documentary
Let's Get Lost – Jonas Elmer	Not awarded
Best Actor	Best Actress
Holger Juul Hansen – The Kingdom II	Sidse Babett Knudsen – Let's Get Lost
Best Supporting Actor	Best Supporting Actress
Jesper Christensen – Barbara	Birgitte Raaberg – The Kingdom II
Best EuropeanFilm	Best Non-European Film
The Full Monty – Peter Cattaneo	L.A. Confidential – Curtis Hanson

=== Bodil Honorary Award ===
Joachim Holbek

== See also ==
- Robert Awards
