= 50th Bodil Awards =

1997 Danish film awards ceremony

- Date: 1997
- Site: Imperial Theatre, Copenhagen

Highlights
- Best Film: Breaking the Waves
- Most awards: Breaking the Waves (3)

The 50th Bodil Awards ceremony was held in 1997 in Copenhagen, Denmark, honouring the best national and foreign films of 1996. Lars von Trier's Breaking the Waves won the award for Best Danish Film and Emily Watson and Katrin Cartlidge won the awards for best leading and supporting actresses. Max von Sydow for his role in Hamsun and Zlatko Buric won the award for best supporting actor for his role in Pusher. Bodil Kjær, one of the two film people named Bodil for whom the statuette is named, the other being Bodil Ipsen, received a Bodil Honorary Award, bringing her total number of Bodil wins up to four.

== Winners ==
Best Danish Film	Best Danish Documentary
Breaking the Waves – Lars von Trier	Not awarded
Best Actor	Best Actress
Max von Sydow – Hamsun	Emily Watson – Breaking the Waves
Best Supporting Actor	Best Supporting Actress
Zlatko Buric – Pusher	Katrin Cartlidge – Breaking the Waves
Best EuropeanFilm	Best Non-European Film
Trainspotting (film) – Anthony Asquith	Fargo – Joel Coen

=== Bodil Honorary Award ===
Bodil Kjær

== See also ==
- Robert Awards
