= 52nd Bodil Awards =

1999 Danish film awards ceremony

- Date: 1999
- Site: Imperial Theatre, Copenhagen

Highlights
- Best Film: The Celebration
- Most awards: The Idiots (3)

The 52nd Bodil Awards ceremony was held in 1999 in Copenhagen, Denmark, honouring the best national and foreign films of 1998. The Celebration directed by Thomas Vinterberg won the award for Best Danish Film.

== Winners ==
Best Danish Film	Best Danish Documentary
The Celebration – Thomas Vinterberg	Not awarded
Best Actor	Best Actress
Ulrich Thomsen – The Celebration	Bodil Jørgensen – The Idiots
Best Supporting Actor	Best Supporting Actress
Nikolaj Lie Kaas – The Idiots	Anne Louise Hassing – The Idiots
Best EuropeanFilm	Best Non-European Film
My Name Is Joe – Ken Loach	The Ice Storm – Ang Lee

=== Bodil Honorary Award ===
Ove Sprogøe

== See also ==
- Robert Awards
