= 5th Bodil Awards =

1952 Danish film awards ceremony

- Date: 1952
- Site: World Cinema, Copenhagen
- Hosted by: Kai Holm

Highlights
- Best Film: Det Sande Ansigt

The 5th Bodil Awards ceremony was held in 1952 in Copenhagen, Denmark, honouring the best national and foreign films of 1951. The event had moved from Palace Hotel's night club Ambassadeur to a local cinema where All the King's Men had its Danish premiere as part of the celebrations.

Bodil Ipsen and Lau Lauritzen, Jr. won their third Bodil for Best Danish Film in the 5-years history of the awards for Det Sande Ansigt. Bodil Kjær won the award for Best Leading Actress for her role in Meet Me on Cassiopeia. Eighty-four-year-old Sigrid Neiiendam won the award for Best Supporting Actress for her role in Fra den gamle købmandsgård. The awards for Best Leading and Supporting Actor were not awarded. The tabloid BT subsequently referred to her as "the oldest film award winner in the World".

== Winners ==
Best Danish Film	Best Danish Documentary
Det Sande Ansigt	Not awarded
Best Actor	Best Actress
Notawarded	Bodil Kjær – Meet Me on Cassiopeia
Best Supporting Actor	Best Supporting Actress
Not awarded	Sigrid Neiiendam – Fra den gamle købmandsgård
Best American Film	Best European Film
The Browning Version – Anthony Asquith	All About Eve – Joseph L. Mankiewicz

== See also ==
- Robert Awards
