= 3rd Bodil Awards =

1950 Danish film awards ceremony

- Date: 1950
- Site: Ambassadeur, Copenhagen

Highlights
- Best Film: Susanne
- Most awards: Susanne (3)

The 3rd Bodil Awards ceremony was held in 1950 in Copenhagen, Denmark, honouring the best national and foreign films of 1949. The event had moved from Palace Hotel's night club Ambassadeur to a local cinema where All the King's Men had its Danish premiere as part of the celebrations.

Torben Anton Svendsen's film Susanne won the award for Best Danish Film. Erik Mørk and Astrid Villaume won the awards for Best Actor and Actress in a Leading Role for their performances in the same film.

== Winners ==
Best Danish Film	Best Danish Documentary
Susanne	Not awarded
Best Actor	Best Actress
Erik Mørk – Susanne	Astrid Villaume – Susanne
Best Supporting Actor	Best Supporting Actress
Not awarded	Not awarded
Best Non-American Film	Best American Film
The Fallen Idol	The Snake Pit

== See also ==
- Robert Awards
