= Breaking the Waves =

1996 film by Lars von Trier

- Theatrical release poster
- Directed by: Lars von Trier
- Written by: Lars von Trier; Peter Asmussen
- Produced by: Peter Aalbæk Jensen; Vibeke Windeløv
- Starring: Emily Watson; Stellan Skarsgård; Katrin Cartlidge; Jean-Marc Barr; Udo Kier
- Cinematography: Robby Müller
- Edited by: Anders Refn
- Production company: Zentropa
- Distributed by: Metronome Films ApS (Denmark); Svenska Filminstitutet; Triangelfilm (Sweden); Les Films du Losange (France); Norsk Film Distribusjon (Norway); Senso Films (Finland); Lucky Red (Italy); Pandora Film (Germany); October Films (United States)
- Release date: 18 May 1996 (Cannes)
- Running time: 158 minutes
- Countries: Denmark; Sweden; France; Netherlands; Norway; Iceland; Finland; Italy; Germany; United States
- Language: English
- Budget: $7.5 million
- Box office: $23 million

Breaking the Waves is a 1996 psychological romantic melodrama film directed and co-written by Lars von Trier and starring Emily Watson in her feature film acting debut, and with Stellan Skarsgård, a frequent collaborator with von Trier.

Set in the Scottish Highlands in the early 1970s, it is about an unusual young woman and the love she has for her husband. The film is divided into seven chapters and an epilogue, separated by audio-visual art by Per Kirkeby and accompanied by music.

The film is an international co-production between the US, Denmark, seven other European countries, and is von Trier's first feature film with his Danish production company Zentropa. As von Trier's first film made after his founding of the Dogme 95 movement, it is heavily influenced by the movement's style and ethos. It is the first film in Trier's Golden Heart trilogy, which includes The Idiots (1998) and Dancer in the Dark (2000), the former made in compliance with the Dogme 95 Manifesto.

Breaking the Waves was well-received, with Emily Watson's acting receiving unanimous critical praise and earning her first Academy Award nomination. The film has been described as "perhaps von Trier's most widely acclaimed film" and cited as among the best films of the 1990s. The film won numerous awards, including the Grand Prix at the 1996 Cannes Film Festival.

== Plot ==
Bess McNeill is a young and pretty Scottish woman who has, in the past, had treatment for an unspecified mental health condition after the death of her brother. She opines to others that a church should have bells, unlike theirs. She marries oil rig worker Jan Nyman, a Danish non-churchgoer, despite disapproval from her community and her Free Scottish Presbyterian Calvinist church. Bess is steadfast and pure of heart but quite simple and childlike in her beliefs. During her frequent visits to the church, she prays to God and carries on conversations with him in her own voice, believing that he is responding directly through her.

Bess is infatuated with Jan and has difficulty living without him when he is away on the oil platform. Jan makes occasional phone calls to Bess, in which they express their love and sexual desires. Bess grows needy and prays for his immediate return. The next day, Jan is severely injured in an industrial accident and is flown back to the mainland. Bess believes her prayer was the reason the accident occurred and that God was punishing her for her selfishness in asking him to neglect his job and return to her. No longer able to perform sexually and mentally affected by the paralysis, Jan asks Bess to find a lover. Bess is devastated and storms out. Jan then attempts to commit suicide and fails. He falls unconscious and is readmitted to the hospital.

Jan's condition deteriorates. He urges Bess to find another lover and tell him the details, as it will be as if they are together and will revitalize his spirits. Though her sister-in-law Dodo constantly reassures her that nothing she does will affect his recovery, Bess begins to believe these suggestions are the will of God and in accordance with loving Jan wholely. Despite her repulsion and inner turmoil at the thought of being with other men, she perseveres in her own sexual debasement, believing it will save her husband. Bess throws herself at Jan's doctor, but when he rebuffs her, she takes to picking up men off the street and allowing herself to be brutalized in increasingly cruel sexual encounters. In the face of probable expulsion from her church, she proclaims, "You cannot love words. You cannot be in love with a word. You can only love a human being. That's perfection". The entire village is scandalised by these doings, and Bess is excommunicated.

Dodo and Jan's doctor agree the only way to keep Bess safe from herself is to have her committed and move as far away from her husband – whom they believe to be in terminal decline – as possible. Bess decides to make what she thinks is the ultimate sacrifice for Jan: she unflinchingly returns to a derelict ship, where sailors brutally attack her. Dodo and Mrs. McNeill meet a severely injured Bess in the hospital for the last time, forgiving her for her actions. Bess dies in Dodo's arms.

Her church deems her soul to be lost and hell-bound. Unbeknownst to the church elders, Jan and his friends have substituted bags of sand for Bess's body inside her sealed coffin. Without notice to the church elders, Dodo condemns them, saying no-one has the right to consign Bess to hell. Later, Jan is shown, substantially restored to health despite the doctors not having thought it possible, burying Bess in the ocean, deep in grief. The film ends in magical realism as crewmen show Jan the radar screen is clear of contacts then take him topside where church bells are heard ringing from high in the sky.

== Cast ==
- Emily Watson as Bess McNeill
- Stellan Skarsgård as Jan Nyman
- Katrin Cartlidge as Dodo McNeill
- Jean-Marc Barr as Terry
- Adrian Rawlins as Dr. Richardson
- Jonathan Hackett as The Minister
- Sandra Voe as Mrs. McNeill
- Udo Kier as The Man on the Trawler
- Mikkel Gaup as Pits
- Roef Ragas as Pim
- Phil McCall as Grandfather
- Robert Robertson as Chairman

== Production ==
=== Development ===
Breaking the Waves was von Trier's first film after founding the Dogme 95 movement with fellow Danish director Thomas Vinterberg. Nonetheless, the film breaks many of the movement's "rules", including built sets, post-dubbed music and computer graphics. It was shot entirely with handheld Super35mm cameras and is the first of von Trier's Golden Heart trilogy, so named after a children's book called Guldhjerte he had read about a little girl lost in the woods who gives away everything she has to others needier than herself. He wanted to make a naturalistic film that was also a religious film without any miracles. Von Trier claimed that it took him five years to write the film and get financial backing, and he began to lose enthusiasm for it right after filming began. It had a budget of 42 million kroner.

Helena Bonham Carter was von Trier's first choice to play the role of Bess, but she dropped out just before shooting was to start, reportedly due to the large amount of nudity and sexuality required by the role. Several other big-name actresses were considered, but none of them was comfortable with the subject matter. Von Trier was eventually won over by Emily Watson's audition, even though she was a complete unknown in the film industry at the time. She was expelled from the School of Philosophy and Economic Science for having played such an explicit role in the film.

=== Filming ===
Von Trier initially wanted to film the exterior scenes on the west coast of Jutland, then in Norway, then in Ostende, Belgium, then in Ireland, before finally settling on Scotland. The graveyard was built for the film on the Isle of Skye; the church is in Lochailort, the harbour in Mallaig, and the beach in Morar. Von Trier chose the Isle of Skye because it was popular with 19th century English romantic painters and writers. The interiors were shot at Det Danske Filmstudie in Lyngby, Denmark. Principal photography began on 7 August 1995 and completed shooting on 20 October 1995. Emily Watson revealed that originally, in the script, the scene of Bess' wedding night was much more traditional, with Bess getting undressed.

=== Music ===
End of film credits:

1. "All the Way from Memphis" – Mott the Hoople
2. "Blowin' in the Wind" – Tom Harboe, Jan Harboe & Ulrik Corlin
3. "Pipe Major Donald MacLean" – Peter Roderick MacLeod
4. "In a Broken Dream" – Python Lee Jackson, featuring Rod Stewart
5. "Cross-Eyed Mary" – Jethro Tull
6. "I Did What I Did for Maria" – Tony Christie
7. "Virginia Plain" – Roxy Music
8. "A Whiter Shade of Pale" – Procol Harum
9. "Hot Love" – T. Rex
10. "Suzanne" – Leonard Cohen
11. "Love Lies Bleeding" – Elton John
12. "Goodbye Yellow Brick Road" – Elton John
13. "Whiskey in the Jar" – Thin Lizzy
14. "Child in Time" – Deep Purple
15. "Life on Mars" – David Bowie
16. "Siciliana" (Sonata BWV 1031 / 2nd movement) – Johann Sebastian Bach
17. "Gay Gordons" – Tom Harboe, Jan Harboe & Ulrik Corlin
18. "Scotland the Brave" – Tom Harboe, Jan Harboe & Ulrik Corlin
19. "Barren Rock of Aden" – Tom Harboe, Jan Harboe & Ulrik Corlin
20. "Happy Landing" – P. Harmann

The original soundtrack album also includes "He's Gonna Step on You Again" – John Kongos.

== Style ==
The film is divided into seven chapters. Each chapter begins with a different impressionistically filmed panorama title frame featuring early 1970s rock music interludes. Each of these chapters is filmed with a motionless camera, but features movement in the panorama. In the original released film, the epilogue, "The Funeral", features David Bowie's "Life on Mars", which was replaced by Elton John's "Your Song" on early home video releases; the more recent Criterion edition restores the Bowie song. The overall style is heavily influenced by the realist Dogme 95 movement, of which von Trier was a founding member, and its grainy images and hand-held photography give it the superficial aesthetic of a Dogme film. However, the Dogme rules demand the use of real locations, whereas many of the locations in Breaking the Waves were constructed in a studio. In addition, the film is set in the past and contains dubbed music, as well as a brief scene featuring CGI, none of which is permitted by the Dogme rules.

Some saw Breaking the Waves as mainstream cinema. Others saw it as a high-budget experimental film due to its elaborate chapter shots and handheld camera in a sketchy raw style that followed the actors closely. Breaking the Waves marked an important change in focus for Lars von Trier. In von Trier's early films, the protagonist is a man, typically a disillusioned idealist whose downfall is furthered by a deceitful femme fatale. In this film, for the first time the protagonist is an emotional and naïve woman. This motif continues in several of his later films, such as Dancer in the Dark, Dogville, and Manderlay. Breaking the Waves controversially connects religion with phallocentrism. The film focuses on sexual perversity and female martyrdom, issues that continue in Trier's later work.

The film was made using Panavision equipment. The low-res look of the scenes was obtained by transferring the film to video, and then back to film again. According to von Trier, "what we did was take a style and lay it like a filter over the story. It's like decoding a television signal when you pay to see a film. Here we encoded the film, and the audience has to decode it. The raw, documentary style that I imposed on the film, which actually dissolves and contradicts it, means that we can accept the story as it is".

== Reception ==
=== Critical response ===
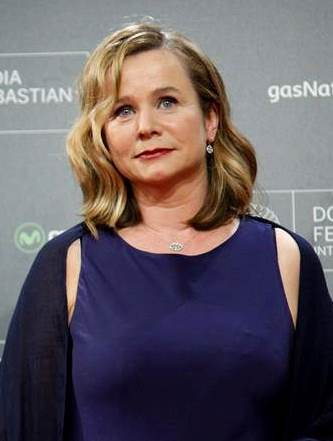
Emily Watson (pictured in 2016) received critical acclaim for her performance of Bess McNeil.

The film garnered an 85% approval rating on Rotten Tomatoes from 65 reviews. The critical consensus reads, "Breaking the Waves offers a remarkable testament to writer-director Lars von Trier's insight and filmmaking skill -- and announces Emily Watson as a startling talent". It also holds an 82/100 rating on Metacritic based on 28 reviews, citing a "universal acclaim" reception. During a show where film personalities listed their top movies of the 1990s, Breaking the Waves was named one of the ten best films of the decade by both critic Roger Ebert and director Martin Scorsese.

In an essay for the Criterion Collection, David Sterritt interpreted it as a film in which "no one is 'bad', everyone is 'good', and when trouble flares anyway, it's because incompatible concepts of 'good' can violently conflict with one another"; he praised the ending as "a magical vision that elevates the final moments to radically metaphysical heights".

=== Box office ===
The film grossed over $23 million worldwide including $4.6 million in France; $4 million in the US and Canada; $1.7 million in Italy; and $1.1 million in the UK.

=== Accolades ===
Award	Date of ceremony	Category	Recipient(s)	Result	Ref(s)
Academy Awards	24 March 1997	Best Actress	Emily Watson	Nominated	
BAFTA Awards	29 April 1997	Best Actress	Emily Watson	Nominated	
Bodil Awards	1997	Best Danish Film	Lars von Trier	Won	
Bodil Awards	1997	Best Actress	Emily Watson	Won	
Bodil Awards	1997	Best Supporting Actress	Katrin Cartlidge	Won	
Boston Society of Film Critics	13 December 1996	Best Actress	Emily Watson	Nominated	
Boston Society of Film Critics	13 December 1996	Best Director	Lars von Trier	Nominated	
Boston Society of Film Critics	13 December 1996	Best Cinematography	Robby Müller	Nominated	
Cannes Film Festival	20 May 1996	Grand Prix	Lars von Trier	Won	
César Awards	8 February 1997	Best Foreign Film	Lars von Trier	Won	
European Film Awards	8 November 1996	Best Film	Lars von Trier	Won	
European Film Awards	8 November 1996	Best Actress	Emily Watson	Won	
European Film Awards	8 November 1996	FIPRESCI Prize	Lars von Trier	Won	
Golden Globes	19 January 1997	Best Motion Picture – Drama		Nominated	
Golden Globes	19 January 1997	Best Actress in a Motion Picture – Drama	Emily Watson	Nominated	
Guldbagge Awards	10 February 1997	Best Foreign Film	Lars von Trier	Won	
Independent Spirit Awards	22 March 1997	Best Foreign Film	Lars von Trier	Nominated	
Los Angeles Film Critics Association	14 December 1996	New Generation Award	Emily Watson	Won	
National Society of Film Critics	5 January 1997	Best Film		Won	
National Society of Film Critics	5 January 1997	Best Director	Lars von Trier	Won	
National Society of Film Critics	5 January 1997	Best Actress	Emily Watson	Won	
National Society of Film Critics	5 January 1997	Best Cinematographer	Robby Müller	Won	
New York Film Critics Circle	5 January 1997	Best Film		3rd Place	
New York Film Critics Circle	5 January 1997	Best Director	Lars von Trier	Won	
New York Film Critics Circle	5 January 1997	Best Actress	Emily Watson	Won	
New York Film Critics Circle	5 January 1997	Best Cinematographer	Robby Müller	Won	

== Operatic adaptation ==
Composer Missy Mazzoli and librettist Royce Vavrek premiered their operatic adaptation of the film on 22 September 2016, at Opera Philadelphia. The work was called "the most startling and moving new American opera in memory" by parterre box, with Opera News proclaiming that it "stands among the best twenty-first-century American operas yet produced".

== Home media ==
The Criterion Collection initially released the film in the United States in 1997 on LaserDisc in a director's approved 2-disc edition and featured four deleted scenes selected by Lars von Trier, the complete European director's cut, a promo clip prepared by Lars von Trier for the 1996 Cannes Film Festival and the U.S. theatrical trailer. On 27 January 1998, the film was made available on VHS format courtesy of Artisan Entertainment in an edited cut, while a subsequent DVD release was made available from Artisan on 25 July 2000, in a non-anamorphic edition and lacking the special features which appeared on Criterion's LaserDisc edition. Criterion again reacquired home distribution rights to the film and released a Dual-Format digipack 1-disc Blu-ray and 2-disc DVD edition on 15 April 2014. The set contains a new 4k transfer and DTS-HD 5.1 Master Audio, most of the previous restored special features from the original LaserDisc, in addition to new select-scene audio commentary featuring von Trier, editor Anders Refn, and location scout Anthony Dod Mantle, new interview with filmmaker and critic Stig Björkman, new interviews with actors Emily Watson and Stellan Skarsgård, interview from 2004 with actor Adrian Rawlins, excerpts from Watson's audition tape, with commentary by von Trier, deleted scene featuring late actor Katrin Cartlidge and a booklet featuring an essay by critic David Sterritt and an excerpt from the 1999 book Trier on von Trier.

In the United Kingdom, Breaking the Waves was first released on VHS home video on 28 April 1997, while a second VHS was released in a 'Special Widescreen Edition' on 1 October 1999 via Pathé. Pathé made the film available on DVD format on 1 September 2003, and featured its original aspect ratio in a 16:9 anamorphic screen, with Dolby Digital English 5.1, Italian 2.0 dub and multiple subtitle options. The special features include select commentary from Lars von Trier and Anders Refn interviewed by Anthony Dod Mantle. Curzon Artificial Eye currently occupy distribution rights in the UK and have released the film on DVD and on Blu-ray on 10 November 2014. Curzon featured their 4k restoration on Blu-Ray in their Lars Von Trier Collection box set in 2023, and then in a 4K Blu-Ray release soon after.

== Bibliography ==
- Breaking the Waves (DVD liner notes). Vol. 705. The Criterion Collection. 2014.
- Tiefenbach, Georg (2010). Drama und Regie (Writing and Directing): Lars von Trier's Breaking the Waves, Dancer in the Dark, Dogville. Würzburg: Königshausen & Neumann. ISBN 978-3-8260-4096-2.
- Trier, Lars von (1996). Breaking the Waves. Faber. ISBN 978-0-571-19115-4.
- Villadsen, Ebbe. Danish Erotic Film Classics (2005)
- Tiefenbach, Georg (2025). The Lars von Trier Conversations. Volume One. About the Art of Filmmaking: Editing, Sound Design, and Costume Design. Conversations with Molly Malene Stensgaard, Per Streit, and Manon Rasmussen. Königshausen & Neumann. ISBN 978-3-8260-9039-4
