= 72nd Bodil Awards =

2019 Danish film awards ceremony

- Date: 2 March 2019
- Site: Stærekassen, Copenhagen
- Hosted by: Iben Hjejle and Signe Lindkvist

Highlights
- Best Film: Holiday

The 72nd Bodil Awards were held on 2 March 2019 in Denmark, honoring the best national and foreign films of 2018.

It was hosted by Iben Hjejle and Signe Lindkvist.

== Winners ==
Best Danish Film	Best Danish Documentary
Holiday – Isabella Eklöf	The Distant Barking of Dogs – Simon Lereng Wilmont
Best Actor	Best Actress
Jakob Cedergren – The Guilty	Vic Carmen Sonne – Holiday
Best Supporting Actor	Best Supporting Actress
Lai Yde – Holiday	Katrine Greis-Rosenthal – A Fortunate Man
Best European Film	Best Non-European Film
Roma – Alfonso Cuarón	The Florida Project – Sean Baker
