= 2nd Bodil Awards =

1949 Danish film awards ceremony

- Date: 29 April 1949
- Site: Ambassadeur, Copenhagen
- Hosted by: Ib Schønberg

Highlights
- Best Film: The Viking Watch of the Danish Seaman

The 2nd Bodil Awards ceremony was held on 29 April 1949 at Palace Hotel's night club Ambassadeur in Copenhagen, Denmark, honouring the best national and foreign films of 1938. Ib Schønberg acted as host and Lily Broberg, Poul Reichhardt and Grethe Thordahl performed at the event which was attended by 300 guests.

Bodil Ipsen's and Lau Lauritzen, Jr.'s The Viking Watch of the Danish Seaman won the award for Best Danish Film and Johannes Meyer won the award for Best Supporting Actor for his role in it. Mogens Wieth won the award for Best Leading Actor for his role in Kampen mod uretten. Karin Nellemose won the award for Best Leading Actress for her role in the same film and the award for Best Supporting Actress for Mens porten var lukket.

== Winners ==
Best Danish Film	Honorary Bodil Award
The Viking Watch of the Danish Seaman	Annelise Reenberg for her work as a cinematographer on Astrid and Bjarne Henning Jensen's Kristinus Bergman
Best Actor	Best Actress
Mogens Wieth – Kampen mod uretten	Karin Nellemose – Kampen mod uretten
Best Supporting Actor	Best Supporting Actress
Johannes Meyer – The Viking Watch of the Danish Seaman	Karin Nellemose – Mens porten var lukket
Best American Film	Best Non-American Film
Monsieur Verdoux	Hamlet

== See also ==
- Robert Awards
