= 4th Bodil Awards =

1951 Danish film awards ceremony

- Date: 30 April 1951
- Site: World Cinema, Copenhagen
- Hosted by: Herbert Steinthal

Highlights
- Best Film: Café Paradis
- Most awards: Café Paradis (2)

The 4th Bodil Awards ceremony was held on 30 April 1951 in Copenhagen, Denmark, honouring the best national and foreign films of 1950. The event took place in the World Cinema where Born Yesterday had its Danish premiere as part of the celebrations.

Bodil Ipsen and Lau Lauritzen, Jr. won their second Bodil for Best Danish Film in the 4-years history of the awards for Café Paradis. Preben Lerdorff Rye won the award for Best Leading Actor for his role in I gabestokken while Ib Schønberg won the award for Best Supporting Actor for his role in Café Paradis. Best Leading and Supporting Actresses were not awarded. Finance minister H. C. Hansen received the first ever Honorary Bodil Award for lowering film taxes.

== Winners ==
Best Danish Film	Best Danish Documentary
Café Paradis	Not awarded
Best Actor	Best Actress
Preben Lerdorff Rye – I gabestokken	Not awarded
Best Supporting Actor	Best Supporting Actress
Ib Schønberg – Café Paradis	Not awarded
Best American Film	Best Non-American Film
Sunset Boulevard – Billy Wilder	Bicycle Thieves – Vittorio de Sica

=== Honorary Award ===
- H.C. Hansen for lowering film taxes

== See also ==
- Robert Awards
