= Helle Fastrup =

Danish actress (1951–2022)

- Born: 6 November 1951
- Died: 15 April 2022 (aged 70); Diakonissestiftelsen, Denmark
- Occupation: Actress
- Awards: Bodil

Helle Fastrup (6 November 1951 – 15 April 2022) was a Danish actress. She was awarded the Bodil Award for Best Actress in a Supporting Role in 1981.

Fastrup died of cancer at a hospice, aged 70. Her death was announced by a close friend.

== Filmography ==
- Cirkus Casablanca (1981)
- Den kroniske uskyld (1987)
- Ledsaget Udgang (2007)
