= 19 Red Roses =

1974 film

- Film poster
- Directed by: Esben Høilund Carlsen
- Written by: Esben Høilund Carlsen; Torben Nielsen
- Produced by: Per Årman; Erik Crone; Jørgen Lademann
- Starring: Henning Jensen
- Cinematography: Henning Camre
- Edited by: Lars Brydesen
- Release date: 16 August 1974
- Running time: 99 minutes
- Country: Denmark
- Language: Danish

19 Red Roses (Danish: Nitten røde roser) is a 1974 Danish crime film directed by Esben Høilund Carlsen and starring Henning Jensen.

== Plot ==
The film follows Detective Ancher (Poul Reichhardt) and his team as they investigate a series of murders that happened over a period of days. Seemingly unrelated at first, the investigators soon deduce that the killings are connected and stem from an incident that associates of the victims were all involved in.

== Cast ==
- Henning Jensen as William Brehmer
- Poul Reichhardt as Kriminalassistent Ancher
- Jens Okking as Kriminalassistent Brask
- Ulf Pilgaard as Kriminalassistent Rieger
- Holger Juul Hansen as Kriminalkommisær Runge
- Troels Munk as Henri Durant
- Lisbet Lipschitz as Frk. Durant
- Helle Virkner as Marianne Durant
- Mogens Brix-Pedersen as Otto Lintz
- Birgit Sadolin as Fru Lintz
- Paul Hüttel as Poul Steffensen
- Bendt Rothe as Janus Bech
- Birgitte Federspiel as Louise Bech
- Lene Vasegaard as Charlotte Nørlund
- Rasmus Windfelt as Charlotte Nørlunds søn
- Preben Lerdorff Rye as Holger Hjort
- Pia Grønning as Bitten Hjort
- Holger Munk as Direktør Pelving
- Vibeke Juul Bengtsson as Direktør Pelvings sekretær
- Bente PuggaardasMüller as Politibetjent
- Per Årman as Spejderfører

== Sequel ==
The film was followed with a sequel, Terror, in 1977. All of the major characters returned for this followasup.
