= Morten Piil =

Danish writer and film critic (1943–2018)

- Born: 1 March 1943; Copenhagen, Denmark
- Died: 22 March 2018 (aged 75)
- Occupations: Film critic, writer

Morten Piil (1 March 1943 – 22 March 2018) was a Danish writer and film critic. He received a Bodil Honorary Award in 2002 for his "long-standing contribution to Danish film literature".

Piil was a film critic at Berlingske Tidende 1962–67, and has since then been at Dagbladet Information where he has also written about literature and rock music. He was a film consultant at the Danish Film Institute 1975–77, and 1968-96 consultant for DR's film department.

Piil has written several reference works on Danish cinema. His three books published on Gyldendal, Danske filmskuespillere ("Danish film actors") (2001), a monograph on 525 actors active in the period 1930–2001, Danske filminstruktører ("Danish filmmakers") (2005), detailing 120 Danish film directors active between 1930 and 2005, and Gyldendals danske filmguide ("Gyldendals Danish film guide") (2008), a description of 1200 Danish feature films — virtually every major film release from 1930 to 2008, poses with a total volume of approximately 1,800 pages the most comprehensive survey of Danish film and the main figures behind it.

In 2003, Information published Film på hjernen: 40 års bedste biografoplevelser a 664-page selection of his film criticism from the last 40 years.

Piil has translated three works of Vladimir Nabokov to Danish.

== Selected works ==
- Ib Monty; Morten Piil (1964). Se — det er film: en antologi af filmessays (in Danish). Copenhagen, Denmark: Fremad.
- Ib Monty; Morten Piil (1965). Se — det er film: en antologi af filmessays (in Danish). Vol. 2. Copenhagen, Denmark: Fremad.
- Ib Monty; Morten Piil (1966). Se — det er film: en antologi af filmessays (in Danish). Vol. 3. Copenhagen, Denmark: Fremad.
- Per Calum; Morten Piil; Viggo Holm Jensen; Ib Monty (1969). Generationsskifte i Hollywood (in Danish). Copenhagen, Denmark: Det Danske Filmmuseum.
- Ib Monty; Morten Piil (1970). Se, det er film — i klip (in Danish). Copenhagen, Denmark: Fremad.
- François Truffaut; Alfred Hitchcock; Morten Piil (1973). Hitchcock om Hitchcock (in Danish). Copenhagen, Denmark: Rhodos.
- Peter Kirkegaard; Morten Piil; Bo Tao Michaëlis; Jørgen Stegelmann; Marianne Rosen; Anders Bodelsen (1985). Truffaut: tolv film-essays (in Danish). Copenhagen, Denmark: Centrum. ISBN 978-87-583-0270-6.
- Morten Piil (2000). Gyldendals filmguide: danske film fra A til Z (in Danish). Copenhagen, Denmark: Gyldendal. ISBN 978-87-00-47806-0.
- Christian Monggaard [in Danish]; Morten Piil (2003). Filmquiz: Bind 1 (in Danish). Copenhagen, Denmark: Informations Forlag. ISBN 978-87-7514-089-3.
- Morten Piil (2003). Film på hjernen: 40 års bedste biografoplevelser (in Danish). Copenhagen, Denmark: Informations forlag. ISBN 978-87-7514-077-0.
- Christian Monggaard [in Danish]; Jacob Wendt Jensen; Morten Piil (2004). Filmquiz: Bind 2 (in Danish). Copenhagen, Denmark: Informations Forlag. ISBN 978-87-7514-102-9.
- Morten Piil (2005). Danske filminstruktører (in Danish). Copenhagen, Denmark: Gyldendal. ISBN 978-87-02-02981-9.
- Morten Piil (2006). Danske filmskuespillere (in Danish). Copenhagen, Denmark: Gyldendal. ISBN 978-87-02-02104-2.
- Morten Piil (2008). Gyldendals danske filmguide (in Danish). Copenhagen, Denmark: Gyldendal. ISBN 978-87-02-06669-2.
