= Holiday (2018 film) =

2018 film

- Film poster
- Directed by: Isabella Eklöf
- Written by: Johanne Algren; Isabella Eklöf
- Produced by: David B. Sørensen
- Starring: Victoria Carmen Sonne
- Cinematography: Nadim Carlsen
- Edited by: Olivia Neergaard-Holm
- Music by: Martin Dirkov
- Distributed by: Reel Pictures
- Release dates: 21 January 2018 (Sundance); 11 October 2018 (Denmark)
- Countries: Denmark; Netherlands; Sweden
- Language: Danish
- Box office: $2,671

Holiday is a 2018 internationally co-produced drama film directed by Isabella Eklöf and produced by David B. Sørensen. It was screened in the World Cinema Dramatic Competition section at the 2018 Sundance Film Festival. The film won four Bodil Awards, including Best Danish Film.

== Plot ==
Michael is a drug dealer who takes his friends, including younger girlfriend and collaborator Sascha, on a vacation to Bodrum in the Turkish Riviera. There, they engage in activities such as sunbathing and enjoying the water park. Michael appears to spoil Sascha, but drugs her and sexually assaults her during the night. While visiting an ice cream shop, Sascha meets two Dutch men, Frederik and Tomas, and speaks with them informally. Sascha and her friends go to a restaurant for dinner and she spots the Dutch men again and speaks to them. She meets Tomas one night and shares drugs with him. When one of his men, Musse, shows up at the house after a contact fails to show, Michael viciously beats him, fearing the police could have followed Musse to him. Still raging he rapes Sascha, an attack which is witnessed by an unknown party in the house, who does nothing to intervene. Michael realizes the drug deals have been a success, and handsomely rewards Musse.

Alone, Sascha visits the nearby harbour where she spots the Dutch flag on one of the boats and realizes it must be Tomas'. She joins the two Dutch men on the boat for drinks when Michael happens upon them. Jealous, Michael introduces himself as Sascha's employer and boards the boat to join the small party. Tomas speaks about how he left his suburban life and sales career for the boat and how it helped his "soul". Michael is skeptical about this story and suggests Tomas is looking for sex. When Michael and Sascha walk home, Michael interrogates her about how she knows Tomas and how many times they have met. At the house, Michael finds Tomas on Sascha's phone contact list and calls him, inviting him for steaks on the pretense that Michael wants to consult Tomas about buying a boat. The three have dinner (during which Michael recounts stories of his crimes to intimidate Tomas) and eventually go into the house, where Michael invasively questions Tomas further on his sexual interest in Sascha, and assaults a visibly uncomfortable Sascha in front of him. Michael orders the deeply unsettled Tomas to leave under threat of harm, and he complies; Sascha is crestfallen.

Sascha visits Tomas' boat once again, with bruises around her neck, to apologize for the evening. Tomas realizes Michael is abusive, but is unwilling to speak with her. Annoyed, he tells her she and her friends will all be dead or in prison in a few years and he will not be whisking her away on his boat to romantically free her from her circumstances. After Tomas repeatedly calls her stupid, Sascha snaps, picks up a glass pitcher and repeatedly hits Tomas over the head with it, killing him. She then throws the pitcher and her shoes into the sea. She stops by the Turkish police station, but leaves without confessing anything and returns to Michael. The next day, Sascha is seen at the harbour, watching Michael's men clean Tomas's boat of evidence of the murder. When Frederik arrives, looking for Tomas, she lies and claims that he had stood her up and she is unable to reach him; she leads him away so that he cannot witness the cleanup. The film ends with Sascha seemingly happy and partying with Michael and his friends on his new luxury yacht, as though nothing has happened.

== Cast ==
- Victoria Carmen Sonne as Sascha
- Lai Yde as Michael
- Thijs Römer as Tomas
- Yuval Segal as Bobby
- Bo Brønnum as Bo
- Adam Ild Rohweder as Musse
- Morten Hemmingsen as Jens
- Mill Jober as Maria
- Laura Kjær as Tanja
- Stanislav Sevcik as Karsten
- Saxe Rankenberg Frey as Emil
- Michiel de Jong as Frederik

== Reception ==
=== Critical response ===
On Rotten Tomatoes the film has an approval rating of 78% based on reviews from 36 critics. The site's critical consensus reads, "Holiday is challenging, but filmgoers interested in taboo-testing cinema should find this one picture whose provocations are justified by a genuinely meaningful story."

=== Accolades ===
Award	Date of ceremony	Category	Recipients	Result	Ref.
Bodil Awards	2 March 2019	Best Danish Film		Won	
Bodil Awards	2 March 2019	Best Actress	Victoria Carmen Sonne	Won	
Bodil Awards	2 March 2019	Best Supporting Actor	Lai Yde Holgaard	Won	
Bodil Awards	2 March 2019	Best Cinematographer	Nadim Carlsen	Won	
Fantastic Fest	September 2018	Next Wave Best Picture	Isabella Eklöf	Won	
Fantastic Fest	September 2018	Next Wave Best Director	Isabella Eklöf	Won	
