= Isabella Eklöf =

Swedish screenwriter and film director

- Born: 10 February 1978 (age 48); Östra Ryds landskommun, Stockholms län, Sweden
- Education: National Film School of Denmark
- Occupation: Screenwriter film director

Isabella Eklöf (born 10 February 1978) is a Swedish screenwriter and film director.

== Education ==
Eklöf attended the National Film School of Denmark.

== Career ==
She served on the crew as a "runner" for the 2008 Swedish film Let the Right One In. Eklöf co-wrote the 2018 Swedish film Border with director Ali Abbasi; together they expanded on the source material, a short story by John Ajvide Lindqvist. For Border, Eklöf, Abbasi and Lindqvist were nominated for the Guldbagge Award for Best Screenplay; they were also nominated for the European Film Award for Best Screenwriter. She also wrote and directed the 2018 Danish film Holiday, for which she won the New Wave Best Picture and New Wave Best Director awards at the Fantastic Fest in Austin, Texas; Holiday went on to win four Bodil Awards, including Best Danish Film.

== Filmography ==
=== Film ===
Year	Title	Director	Writer	Editor	Notes	Ref.
2009	Willkommen in Barbaristan	Yes	Yes	Yes	Short film	
2011	Notes from Underground	Yes	Yes	No	Short film	
2018	Holiday	Yes	Yes	No	Debut feature; co-written with Johanne Algren	
2018	Border	No	Yes	No	Co-written with Ali Abbasi and John Ajvide Lindqvist	
2023	Kalak	Yes	Yes	Yes	Co-written with Kim Leine and Sissel Dalsgaard Thomsen	

=== Television ===
Year	Title	Director	Editor	Notes	Ref.
2013	Dybvaaaaad!	No	Yes	8 episodes (season 3)	
2021	Servant	Yes	No	2 episodes (season 2)	
2022–2024	Industry	Yes	No	8 episodes (seasons 2–3)	
2025	The Death of Bunny Munro	Yes	No	6 episodes (miniseries)	

== Awards and nominations ==
Year	Award	Category	Nominated work	Result	Ref.
2018	Fantastic Fest	Award for New Wave Best Picture	Holiday	Won	
2018	Fantastic Fest	Award for New Wave Best Director	Holiday	Won	
2018	European Film Awards	Best Screenwriter	Border	Nominated	
2019	Guldbagge Awards	Best Screenplay	Border	Nominated	
2023	British Academy Cymru Awards	Best Director: Fiction	Industry	Nominated	
