= Grethe Holmer =

Danish actress (1924–2004)

Grethe Holmer (12 January 1924, in Copenhagen, Denmark – 13 October 2004) was a Danish actress. She performed in the theatre at the Aarhus Teater and numerous other theatres in Denmark later, and in film and in her later years on television.

== Filmography ==
- Skilsmissens børn - 1939
- Gå med mig hjem - 1941
- Forellen - 1942
- Når man kun er ung - 1943
- Det brændende spørgsmål - 1943
- Elly Petersen - 1944
- Det bødes der for - 1944
- En ny dag gryer - 1945
- Diskret ophold - 1946
- Så mødes vi hos Tove - 1946
- Hr. Petit - 1948
- De røde heste - 1950
- Mosekongen - 1950
- Bag de røde porte - 1951
- Det gamle guld - 1951
- Det store løb - 1952
- Fløjtespilleren - 1953
- Himlen er blå - 1954
- Mod og mandshjerte - 1955
- Gymnasiepigen - 1960
- Med kærlig hilsen - 1971
- Honning Måne - 1978
- Sort høst - 1993
- Farligt venskab - 1995
- Kun en pige - 1995
- Kat (film) - 2001
