= 8th Bodil Awards =

1955 Danish film awards ceremony

- Date: 1955
- Site: Copenhagen

Highlights
- Best Film: Ordet; Der kom en dag
- Best Actor: Emil Hass Christensen; Ordet
- Best Actress: Birgitte Federspiel; Ordet
- Most awards: Ordet (3)

The 8th Bodil Awards was held 1955 in Copenhagen, Denmark, honouring the best in Danish and foreign film of 1954.

Prime Minister H. C. Hansen, who had been given the first Bodil Honorary Award in 1951, was guest of honour at a quite untraditional Bodil event. For the first and only time in the Bodil Award's history two film were awarded Best Danish Film: Carl Theodor Dreyer's Ordet and Sven Methling's Der kom en dag.

Emil Hass Christensen and Birgitte Federspiel each received an award for their performances in Ordet, Umberto D. directed by Vittorio De Sica won the Bodil Award for Best European Film, and On the Waterfront directed by Elia Kazan won the award for Best American Film.

== Winners ==
=== Best Danish Film ===
- Ordet directed by Carl Theodor Dreyer and Der kom en dag directed by Sven Methling

=== Best Actor in a Leading Role ===
- Emil Hass Christensen in Ordet

=== Best Actress in a Leading Role ===
- Birgitte Federspiel in Ordet

=== Best Actor in a Supporting Role ===
- Not awarded

=== Best Actress in a Supporting Role ===
- Not awarded

=== Best European Film ===
- Umberto D. directed by Vittorio De Sica

=== Best American Film ===
- On the Waterfront directed by Elia Kazan
