= Kirsten Rolffes =

Danish actress (1928–2000)

- Born: 20 September 1928; Copenhagen, Denmark
- Died: 10 April 2000 (aged 71); Copenhagen
- Occupation: Actress
- Years active: 1947–2000
- Spouse: Carl Viggo Becker (m. 1951)
- Children: 3

Kirsten Rolffes (20 September 1928 – 10 April 2000) was a Danish actress, internationally mostly recognized for her roles in The Kingdom and Matador. She also had a leading role in Denmark's first sitcom, Een stor familie (One big family), set in an early 1980s office building. She attended drama school at Frederiksberg Theater (1947–48) and at the National Theater (Kongelige teater; 1948–50).

== Career ==
Rolffes trained at the Frederiksberg Theatre and the student school of the Royal Danish Theatre (RDT; Det Kongelige Teater). She acted on stage at the RDT between 1950–63 and 1988–94.

Her role in the country's first soap opera Landsbyen (The Village) helped cement her fame in her native country. She also worked in animation, voicing Ursula in the Danish language version of Disney's The Little Mermaid, Maleficent in the Danish dub of Sleeping Beauty, the Fairy Godmother in the Danish dub of Cinderella and the Evil Queen in the Danish dub of Snow White and the Seven Dwarfs.

== Honors ==
For the 1989 film Waltzing Regitze, Rolffes won the 1990 Bodil Award for Best Supporting Actress.

She was knighted in 1990 by Queen Margrethe II for her services to the theatrical arts.

== Death ==
After fighting breast cancer and having multiple surgical operations, she conceded to the disease and halted treatment in 1995. She died in 2000 in Copenhagen, survived by her three children, and is interred in Garrison Cemetery.

== Television roles ==
Year	Title	Role	Notes	Ref
	Matador	Aunt Anna		
1994	The Kingdom	Mrs. Drusse		
1997	The Kingdom II	Mrs. Drusse		
	En stor familie	Miss Gramme		
	Landsbyen	Ingeborg		

== Filmography ==
Year	Title	Role	Notes
1951	Meet Me on Cassiopeia	Rumsterstang pige	Uncredited
1953	We Who Go the Kitchen Route	Olga	
1955	Gengæld	Fru Donner	
1956	Qivitoq – Fjeldgængeren	Sygeplejerske Kirsten Prage	
1963	Hvad med os?	Gorm's Wife	
1968	I den grønne skov	Spåkone	
1969	The Man Who Thought Life	Værtinden	
1970	Løgneren	Fru Høst	
1974	Rapportpigen	Harriet, the mature woman	
1974	Pigen og drømmeslottet	Emma Holgersen	
1974	Nøddebo præstegaard	Rasmine	
1975	Sønnen fra vingården	Konsulinde Martin	
1977	Mind Your Back, Professor	Sekretær på Slavisk Institut	
1979	Skal vi danse først?	Susannes mor	
1981	Historien om Kim Skov	Skolelærer	
1981	Gummi-Tarzan	Hundedame	
1983	Otto er et næsehorn	Mrs. Flora	
1984	Busters verden	Joanna's Mother	
1985	Walter og Carlo – op på fars hat	Viola van Heimvee	
1986	Valhalla	Ravnen Munin / Røskvas og Tjalfes mor	Danish version, Voice
1986	Walter og Carlo – yes, det er far	Viola van Heimvee	
1987	Sidste akt	Miss Archie	
1988	Elvis Hansen, en samfundshjælper	Putte von Porter	
1989	Waltzing Regitze	Regitze's Mother	
1990	Casanova	Sygeplejerske	
1991	The Great Day on the Beach	Fru. Fredriksen	
1992	Sofie	Jonas' Mother	
1993	Jungledyret		Voice
1997	Nonnebørn	Priorinden / The Prioress	

== Awards and nominations ==
Award	Year	Category	Nominated work	Result	Ref.
Bodil Awards	1998	Best Supporting Actress	Nonnebørn	Nominated	
