= Strømer =

1976 film

- DVD cover
- Directed by: Anders Refn
- Written by: Anders Bodelsen; Knud Buchardt
- Produced by: Erik Crone; Nina Crone
- Starring: Jens Okking; Lotte Hermann; Bodil Kjer; Birgit Sadolin
- Cinematography: Mikael Salomon
- Edited by: Kasper Schyberg
- Music by: Kasper Winding
- Distributed by: Crone Film
- Release date: 29 October 1976
- Running time: 106 minutes
- Country: Denmark
- Language: Danish

Strømer (English: Cop) is a 1976 Danish crime drama film directed by Anders Refn.

== Cast ==
- Jens Okking as Karl Jørgensen
- Lotte Hermann as Vera Jørgensen
- Bodil Kjer as Sabine Lund
- Birgit Sadolin as Grete Svendsholm
- Otto Brandenburg as Willer Johansen
- Henning Palner as Palle Møller
- Preben Harris as Eskebjerg
- Holger Juul Hansen as Kramer
- Bendt Rothe as Mester
- Ove Verner Hansen as Max Thorsen
- Dick Kaysø as John Bullnes
- Lizzie Corfixen as Topsy
- Anne Marie Helger as Marianne
- Inger Stender as Fru Severinsen
- Ulla Jessen as Bente
- Lene Vasegaard as Blonde
- Annie Birgit Garde as Politician's wife
- Jørgen Kiil as Politician
- Gösta Schwarck as Coach Heine Grün
- Finn Nielsen as Bonanza
- Lars Lunøe as Mayor Heidersvold
- Baard Owe as Skull
- Preben Lerdorff Rye as Fessor
- Bent Børgesen as Christian Warnebue
- Erik Kühnau as Warnebue's henchman
- Poul Glargaard as Warnebue's henchman
- Peter Ronild as Redaktør Arnold
- Birger Jensen as Staldkarl
- Alvin Linnemann as Guest at the Guesthouse
- Flemming Quist Møller as Tasketyv
- Alberte Winding as Lis
- Jesper Christensen as Police officer
- André Sallyman as Lawyer
- Voja Miladinowiç as Fremmedarbejder i politiforhør
- Erik Høyer as Getaway driver
