= Birgit Sadolin =

Danish actress (born 1933)

- Born: 10 October 1933 (age 92); Hellerup, Denmark
- Other name: Birgit Møller Petersen
- Occupation: Actor

Birgit Sadolin (born 10 October 1933) is a Danish actress. She entered film in 1953 with the comedy Ved Kongelunden. Sadolin won the Bodil Award for Best Actress in a Leading Role in 1957 for her role in Tre piger fra Jylland.

== Filmography ==
- Ved Kongelunden – 1953
- Karen, Maren og Mette – 1954
- Altid ballade – 1955
- På tro og love – 1955
- Kristiane af Marstal – 1956
- Tre piger fra Jylland – 1957
- Der brænder en ild – 1962
- Een pige og 39 sømænd – 1965
- En ven i bolignøden – 1965
- Dyden går amok – 1966
- Flagermusen – 1966
- Min søsters børn – 1966
- Min søsters børn på bryllupsrejse – 1967
- Sjov i gaden – 1969
- Pigen fra Egborg – 1969
- Nitten røde roser – 1974
- Strømer – 1976
- Slægten – 1978
- Johnny Larsen – 1979
- Otto er et næsehorn – 1983
- Baby Doll – 1988
- Den røde tråd – 1989
- Dansen med Regitze – 1989
- Det skaldede spøgelse – 1992
- Frække Frida og de frygtløse spioner – 1994
- At kende sandheden – 2002
