= Solbjørg Højfeldt =

Danish actress

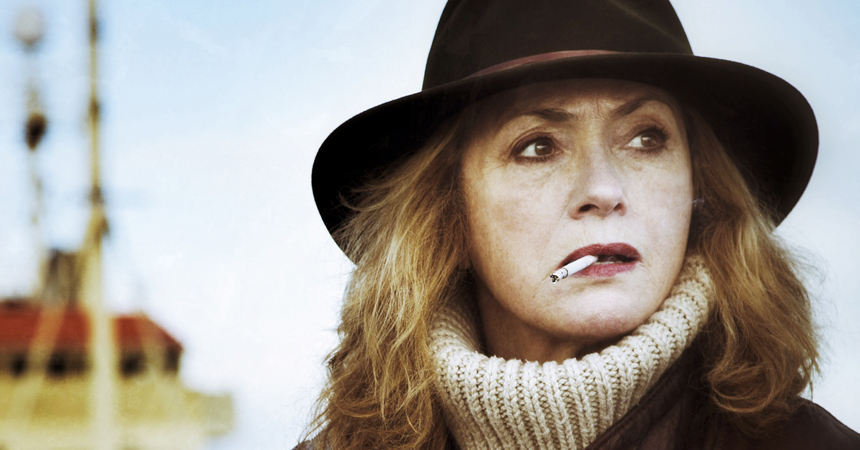
Solbjørg Højfeldt, 2017.

Solbjørg Højfeldt (born 10 June 1947, in Copenhagen) is a Danish actress. She has performed in more than fifty films since 1978. She is married to Danish actor Henning Jensen.

== Selected filmography ==
Film
Year	Title	Role	Notes
2009	No Time for Love		
2004	Brothers	Else	
2000	Flickering Lights	Peter's Mother	
1991	The Boys from St. Petri	Fru Hvidmann	
1988	Medea	Nurse	
1983	Zappa	Steen's Mother	

TV
Year	Title	Role	Notes
2023	Face to Face	Elisabeth Lang	
2017	Ride Upon the Storm (Danish: Herrens Veje)	Nete	
1997	Taxa	Eva Henningsen	
1994	The Kingdom	Camilla	

== Awards ==
- Bodil Award for Best Actress in a Leading Role (1982)
