= 71st Bodil Awards =

2018 Danish film awards ceremony

- Date: 17 March 2018
- Site: Folketeatret, Copenhagen
- Hosted by: Mille Lehfeldt, Laus Høybye, and Jakob Fauerby

Highlights
- Best Film: Winter Brothers
- Best Actor: Dejan Čukić; Fantasten
- Best Actress: Amanda Collin; A Horrible Woman
- Most awards: Winter Brothers (1)
- Most nominations: Darkland (5)

The 71st Bodil Awards were held on 17 March 2018 in Denmark, honoring the best national and foreign films of 2017.

It was hosted by Mille Lehfeldt, Laus Høybye, and Jakob Fauerby.

== Winners ==
Best Danish Film	Best Danish Documentary
Winter Brothers – Hlynur Pálmason	Last Men in Aleppo – Feras Fayyad
Best Actor	Best Actress
Dejan Čukić – Fantasten	Amanda Collin – A Horrible Woman
Best Supporting Actor	Best Supporting Actress
Søren Malling – Den bedste mand	Julie Christiansen – Mens vi lever
Best European Film	Best Non-European Film
The Square – Ruben Östlund	La La Land – Damien Chazelle
