= Altid ballade =

1955 film

- Film poster
- Directed by: Gabriel Axel
- Written by: Leck Fischer
- Produced by: Nordisk Films Kompagni
- Starring: Sigrid Horne-Rasmussen
- Cinematography: Poul Pedersen
- Edited by: Carsten Dahl
- Music by: Sven Gyldmark
- Distributed by: Nordisk Film
- Release date: 31 October 1955
- Running time: 88 minutes
- Country: Denmark
- Language: Danish

Altid ballade (English: Nothing but trouble) is a 1955 Danish drama film directed by Gabriel Axel which focuses on a working-class family. The film was a remake of Edith Carlmar's 1954 film Aldri annet enn bråk, and Axel's début as a film director.

Sigrid Horne-Rasmussen received a Bodil Award for Best Actress in a Leading Role for her role as Helga Nielsen.

== Cast ==
- Sigrid Horne-Rasmussen
- Carl Heger
- Asbjørn Andersen
- Jørn Jeppesen
- Kai Holm
- Kirsten Passer
- Annie Birgit Hansen
- Karen Lykkehus
- Valsø Holm
- Birgit Sadolin
