= 70th Bodil Awards =

2017 Danish film awards ceremony

- Date: 4 March 2017
- Site: Bremen Theater, Copenhagen
- Hosted by: Mille Lehfeldt, Laus Høybye, and Jakob Fauerby

Highlights
- Best Film: In the Blood
- Best Actor: Søren Malling; Parents
- Best Actress: Trine Dyrholm; The Commune
- Most awards: Parents (4)
- Most nominations: The Commune (5)

The 70th Bodil Awards were held on 4 March 2017 in Denmark, honoring the best national and foreign films of 2016. In the Blood won 3 awards, including the Bodil Award for Best Danish Film.

It was hosted by Mille Lehfeldt, Laus Høybye, and Jakob Fauerby.

== Winners ==
Best Danish Film	Best Danish Documentary
In the Blood – Rasmus Heisterberg	The War Show
Best Actor	Best Actress
Søren Malling – Parents	Trine Dyrholm – The Commune
Best Supporting Actor	Best Supporting Actress
Lars Mikkelsen – Der kommer en dag	Victoria Carmen Sonne – In the Blood
Best European Film	Best Non-European Film
Toni Erdmann – Maren Ade	The Revenant – Alejandro González Iñárritu
