= Bodil Kjær =

Danish architect and furniture designer (born 1932)

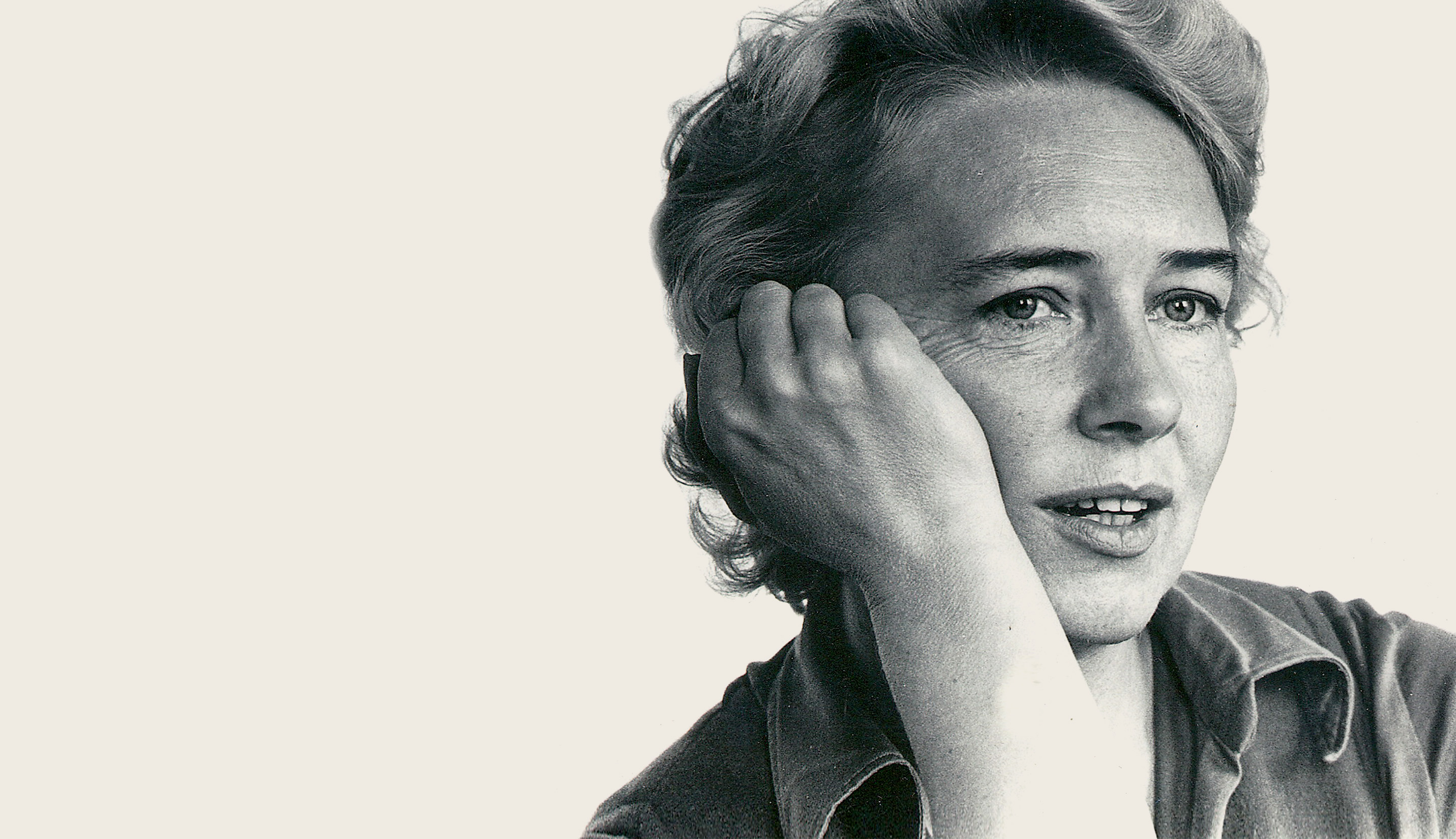
Portrait of Bodil Kjaer

Bodil Kjær (born 11 March 1932) is a Danish architect, furniture designer, professor and researcher, who has specialized in interior design and city planning. Today she is recognized above all for the flexible series of office furniture she designed in the 1960s.

== Early life ==
The daughter of a Jutland farmer, Kjær studied in Copenhagen at the School for Interior Architecture (1964) and then in London at the Royal College of Art and at the Architectural Association School of Architecture (1965–69).

Bodil Kjær was born into a family, where her parents in her terms were "well-read pillar of the community". Within such a family, she started developing an understanding of what makes a cohesive society along with aesthetics, feeling for quality and respect for nature.

As a child, Kjær was very active and engaged with sports. After passing her high school exams at a former Latin School, she went off to England for language studies. This gave her the chance to meet students from different countries and learn about different cultures. While in England, in 1950, discovering the tradition of well-thought-out furniture and accessories eventually led her to study interior architecture.

Following this, in 1951, she started studying at the State School of Interior Architecture in Copenhagen. Having the opportunity to work with teachers like Finn Juhl and Jørgen Ditzel was what she called a "good fortune" and she could learn a lot about the creation of spaces and the design of interior elements.

== Early career ==
Before eventually opening her own practice, Kjær spent the years of her early adulthood abroad. She studied in London at both the Royal College of Art and the Architectural Association School of Architecture (1965-69). Additionally, she worked as a senior architect at the Arup building consultancy in London (1967–69). She has had studios of her own in Copenhagen, Denmark (1960–65) and in London, England (1969–79).

Kjær lived in Italy for some time as well, where she "combined her practice in Europe with teaching appointments at universities in the United States." Said appointments include her time serving as a visiting professor at both Ball State University (1967–1968) and the University of Texas at Arlington (1976–1977), teaching at the Pratt Institute in New York City (1970), and becoming a professor within the Department of Housing and Design at the University of Maryland (1982-89). Ultimately, in 1980 Kjær returned to Denmark.

== Interior design ==
Inspired by the Modernist masters Mies van der Rohe and Marcel Breuer, she has always given her work an international appeal. Her interior design work has included the development of furniture, lighting, and glass for a wide range of buildings from housing in the African tropics to factories, offices and universities. She has since conducted research into the future of cities and has worked as a planning and design consultant.

== Furniture ==
Kjær's furniture designs date mainly from 1959 to 1964. Her first assignment was an upholstered series for Paul Rudolph, dean of the Yale School of Architecture, who made the order for his Blue Cross Blue Shield tower in Boston, Massachusetts. She also provided designs for Josep Lluís Sert, dean of the Harvard Graduate School of Design, for a Harvard University building. Marcel Breuer installed 28 of her upholstered sofas in a building he had designed in New York. Examples of her furniture can still be seen today at Harvard University, Massachusetts Institute of Technology and Boston University. In notes she prepared in 1995 for an exhibition in Berlin, Kjær commented: "I often ran into problems of finding furniture that would express the same form-ideas as those we employed in the buildings we designed and which would, at the same time, express the ideas of contemporary management. The office furniture I found on the market in 1959, I found to be clumsy and confining, while neither the new architecture nor the new management thinking was the least bit clumsy or confining."

Her working table (1959) was designed as part of a flexible working environment. The prototype, in ashwood with a matte, chrome-plated base, was made for Massachusetts Institute of Technology. A model in walnut was made for Wellesley College. In addition to the table with its four inset drawers, Kjær designed a number of storage items with adjustable shelves and drawers which could be placed under the table or beside a wall.

The table has been used widely in films (From Russia with Love) and on television (BBC election broadcasts) as well as by celebrities including Prince Philip (at Sandringham), the actor Michael Caine, and the pianist Oscar Peterson. In the 1960s, the table and storage elements were manufactured by E. Pedersen & Søn in Rødovre, Denmark as well as in Boston. But production terminated in 1974 when one manufacturer went bankrupt and another suffered fire damage. Some of her office units and upholstered designs were reissued between 2007 and 2009 by Hothouse Design in Shanghai but production has now ceased. Today her furniture is auctioned at increasingly high prices. In 2008, one of her working tables was sold for DKK 131,250 or some $24,000.

The Rights to Bodil Kjær's designs are managed by FORM portfolios.

== Exhibitions ==
=== På Vej ===
Bodil Kjær, together with Kirsten Birch (today known as Birk Hansen), was the first curator of På Vej (On the Way) exhibition. The main idea of bringing På Vej into life was to show works of Danish women who were planners, architects and artists to a broader audience.

The significance of På Vej lies beneath the time's politized agenda of gender equality, social and ecological justice. Within that context, the exhibition negotiated feminist concerns and brought up the ongoing tensions and challenges both in the architectural and curatorial practices. På Vej still holds its relevance in today's agenda as it offers a pre-context to contemporary architectural work taking up feminist position.

Not just the exhibition itself but the production of it is also worth looking into in terms of the challenges of the time. The curatorial group published an open call in architectural magazines to receive projects. However, it was evidently proved that it was not as easy as expected to get other women architects to join the exhibition with their works. Although there is no evidence to provide reasons for that, Kjær got herself concerned if it was because of the way they presented the exhibition and its aim. Another challenge was due to the nature of the group and the funding received from Danish Arts Foundation, the Aarhus School of Architecture, the foundation Salling, Copenhagen Culture Fund was only enough to cover the production. Therefore, they had a loosely organized group of unpaid volunteer workers struggling with the workload.

Nevertheless, the exhibition was successfully displayed at Copenhagen City Hall during the summer of 1980, followed by another display in Aarhus City Hall and accompanied with a book Kvinder ytrer sig om omgivelserne in Danish, and Women's Expressions on the Environment: A Commentary to the Exhibition PÅ VEJ That Shows the Work of Women Architects, Planners and Artists in English.

Regarding the overall exhibition, an architectural periodical Arkitekten noted that På Vej challenged the common narrative that women were often overshadowed by their male counterparts. Instead, it highlighted that women architects and artists were equally capable of creative imagination and socio-political engagement.

== See also ==
- Danish modern
- Danish design

== Literature ==
- Jannie Rosenberg Bendsen; Svava Riesto; Henriette Steiner (18 June 2023). Ufortalte Historier. Om Kvinder, køn og arkitektur i Danmark (in Danish) (1st ed.). Copenhagen: Strandberg Publishing. ISBN 978-87-94102-66-7. OCLC 1384442522. Wikidata Q133858010.
