= Frederikke Dahl Hansen =

Danish television and film actress (born 1994)

- Born: 26 March 1994 (age 32); Copenhagen, Denmark
- Occupation: Actress
- Years active: 2011–present

Frederikke Dahl Hansen (born 26 March 1994) is a Danish television and film actress best known for her role in the film Copenhagen as Effy.

== Life and career ==
Frederikke Dahl Hansen was born in Copenhagen, Denmark. She began her acting career in 2008 by appearing in the short film Blændet af solen. She later went on to star in movies such as You & Me Forever as Maria, Rebounce (2011) as Louise, Teenland, and in Copenhagen as Effy. She is also well recognized for her recurring roles in shows like Manden med de gyldne ører and Heartless.

== Awards ==
In 2013, she was awarded the title of Best Actress in a Supporting Role at the Bodil Awards for her appearance as Maria in You & Me Forever.
