= 9th Bodil Awards =

1956 Danish film awards ceremony

- Date: 26 April 1956
- Site: Copenhagen

Highlights
- Best Film: På tro og love
- Best Actor: Ove Sprogøe; På tro og love
- Best Actress: Sigrid Horne-Rasmussen; Altid ballade
- Most awards: På tro og love (2)

The 9th Bodil Awards was held 26 April 1956 in Copenhagen, Denmark, honouring the best in Danish and foreign film of 1955.

The evening started with a preview screening of Alexander Mackendrick's The Ladykillers. American actor Fess Parker was guest and performed on stage in leather jacket and fur hat songs from Davy Crockett, King of the Wild Frontier.

The winner this year was På tro og love (On my Honor) directed by Torben Anton Svendsen. Ove Sprogøe got a well-deserved award for his performance in the film, and Sigrid Horne-Rasmussen received a Bodil for Altid ballade (Always Trouble).

La Strada directed by Federico Fellini won the Bodil Award for Best European Film, and Marty directed by Delbert Mann won the award for Best American Film.

The Bodil Award for Best Documentary had not been handed out since 1948, but Bjarne Henning-Jensen received the second ever awarded for his documentary Hvor bjergene sejler.

== Honorees ==
=== Best Danish Film ===
- På tro og love directed by Torben Anton Svendsen

=== Best Actor in a Leading Role ===
- Ove Sprogøe in På tro og love

=== Best Actress in a Leading Role ===
- Sigrid Horne-Rasmussen in Altid ballade

=== Best Actor in a Supporting Role ===
- Not awarded

=== Best Actress in a Supporting Role ===
- Not awarded

=== Best European Film ===
- La Strada directed by Federico Fellini

=== Best American Film ===
- Marty directed by Delbert Mann

=== Best Documentary ===
- Hvor bjergene sejler directed by Bjarne Henning-Jensen
