= 7th Bodil Awards =

1954 Danish film awards ceremony

- Date: 27 April 1954
- Site: World Cinema, Copenhagen
- Hosted by: Kaj Berg Madsen

Highlights
- Best Film: Farlig Ungdom
- Best Actor: Angelo Bruun; Hendes store aften
- Best Actress: Tove Maës; Himlen er blaa

The 7th Bodil Awards was held on 27 April 1954 at the World Cinema in Copenhagen, Denmark, honoring the best in Danish and foreign film of 1953.

The evening started with a preview screening of James Stewart and June Allyson starring in Anthony Mann's The Glenn Miller Story.

The award ceremony was a triumph for director Lau Lauritzen Jr., who had previously, albeit shared with Bodil Ipsen, received the Bodil for Best Danish Film three times: In 1949, for The Viking Watch of the Danish Seaman, in 1951, for Café Paradis (Paradise Cafe), and in 1952, for Det Sande Ansigt (The True Face). For his direction of Farlig Ungdom he took home the award for Best Danish Film for a fourth time, a record that would stand more than forty years until Lars von Trier in 1997 received his fourth Best Danish Film Bodil for Breaking the Waves.

Foreign films were well represented with René Clément's Forbidden Games winning the Bodil Award for Best European Film, and Julius Caesar directed by Joseph L. Mankiewicz winning the award for Best American Film.

== Winners ==
=== Best Danish Film ===
- Farlig Ungdom directed by Lau Lauritzen Jr.

=== Best Actor in a Leading Role ===
- Angelo Bruun in Hendes store aften

=== Best Actress in a Leading Role ===
- Tove Maës in Himlen er blaa

=== Best Actor in a Supporting Role ===
- Not awarded

=== Best Actress in a Supporting Role ===
- Not awarded

=== Best European Film ===
- Forbidden Games directed by René Clément

=== Best American Film ===
- Julius Caesar directed by Joseph L. Mankiewicz
