= Ditte Gråbøl =

Danish actress (born 1959)

Ditte Gråbøl (born 22 June 1959 in Copenhagen) is a Danish actress. She trained at Aarhus Teater and graduated in 1984. Having worked at Jomfru Ane Teatret, she has appeared in a number of revues, among others the Cirkusrevyen more than once. She has also appeared on TV in Flemming og Berit, Fæhår og Harzen, Bryggeren, Krøniken, The Eagle and Album. Her breakthrough came with the DR satire show, Den gode, den onde og den virk'li sjove which was broadcast from 1990 to 1992. She played various parts on the show but is particularly remembered for her portrayal of a cantankerous, coughing woman in the "Four ordinary Danes" sketch. Gråbøl's name was at the time Ditte Knudsen, Knudsen being her maiden name. She began using the surname of Gråbøl after marrying the director, Niels Gråbøl in 1992. They were, however, divorced in 1998.

== Filmography ==
- Møv og Funder – 1991
- Det store flip – 1997
- Baby Doom – 1998
- Dybt vand – 1999
- Dykkerne – 2000
- En kort en lang – 2001
- Move Me – 2003
- Oh Happy Day – 2004
- Anklaget – 2005
- Lotto – 2006
- Ledsaget udgang – 2007
- In a Better World – 2010
- A Caretaker's Tale – 2012

== Television series ==
- Lykke – 2011

== Awards ==
- 1994: Tagea Brandt Rejselegat
