= In My Life (1978 film) =

1978 film by Bille August

- Film poster
- Directed by: Bille August
- Written by: Bille August
- Produced by: Vibeke Windeløv
- Starring: Claus Strandberg
- Cinematography: Dirk Brüel; Fritz Schrøder
- Edited by: Janus Billeskov Jansen
- Music by: Fuzzy
- Production company: Obel Film ApS
- Distributed by: Konsortiet Honning Måne
- Release date: 21 August 1978
- Running time: 95 minutes
- Country: Denmark
- Language: Danish

In My Life (Danish: Honning Måne) is a 1978 Danish drama film written and directed by Bille August (in his directorial debut). It was entered into the 11th Moscow International Film Festival. For her role as Kirsten's mother, Grethe Holmer won the Bodil Award for Best Actress in a Supporting Role.

== Plot ==
A young man finds love and settles down, but when his young wife spirals into depression they both have decisions to make.

== Cast ==
- Claus Strandberg as Jens
- Kirsten Olesen as Kirsten
- Jens Okking as Bjarne
- Poul Bundgaard as Kirstens far
- Grethe Holmer as Kirstens mor
- Ulla Asbjørn Andersen as Bitten
- Bjarne Buur as Kenneth
- Benno P. Hansen as Sangeren
- Lars Junggren as Brudekjolesælgeren
- Jørgen Kiil as Rejselederen
