= Vibeke Windeløv =

Danish film producer (born 1950)

Vibeke Windeløv (born 22 December 1950) is a Danish film producer. She founded Refugees United in 2008 and served on numerous corporate boards, film festival juries and association committees. She produced the films of Lars von Trier for ten years.

She served on the board of the European Film Academy 1998–2004, on the Jury of the Venice Film Festival 2001, the Montreal Film Festival 2006, Sundance Film Festival 2009 and chaired of the juries of numerous festivals including the international film festival Vladivostok 2008, Ghent 2008 & Sevilla 2008.

She is on the board of European Film Bond, Filmstationen and the Danish Design Center. She is appointed a member of the School Council at the Danish Academy of Fine Arts by the Minister of Culture.

Awarded Chevalier de l’Ordre des Arts et des Lettres, France She won the Prix Eurimages award in the European Film Awards, 2008.

She has recently founded the production companies Windelov/Lassen Aps as well as Windelov/Lassen Interactive Aps together with producer Stinna Lassen.

In 2014 she founded Good Company Films with Stinna Lassen, Ole Sandberg and Anni Fernandez.

== Selected filmography ==
(films produced by Vibeke Windeløv)

Year	English Title	Original Title	Director	Notes
2012	All You Need Is Love		Susanne Bier	
2009/10	Wallander			Executive producer
2009	Mammoth		Lukas Moodysson	Executive producer
2006	The Boss of It All	Direktøren for det hele	Lars von Trier	
2005	Manderlay		Lars von Trier	Main competition in Cannes
2003	The Five Obstructions	De fem benspænd	Lars von Trier and Jørgen Leth	Executive producer
2003	Dogville		Lars von Trier	Main competition in Cannes
2002	Open Hearts	Elsker Dig For Evigt	Susanne Bier	
2000	Dancer in the Dark		Lars von Trier	Main competition in Cannes
1998	The Idiots	Idioterne	Lars von Trier	Main competition in Cannes
1997	The Kingdom II	Riget II	Lars von Trier	
1996	Breaking the Waves		Lars von Trier	Main competition in Cannes
1994	Family Matters	Det Blir I Familien	Susanne Bier	
1989	Christian		Gabriel Axel	
1978	In My Life	Honning Måne	Bille August	
