= Rebounce =

2011 film

- Film poster
- Directed by: Heidi Maria Faisst
- Written by: Heidi Maria Faisst
- Produced by: Meta Louise Foldager
- Starring: Frederikke Dahl Hansen
- Cinematography: Manuel Alberto Claro
- Release date: 28 April 2011
- Running time: 93 minutes
- Country: Denmark
- Language: Danish

Rebounce (Danish: Frit fald) is a 2011 Danish drama film written and directed by Heidi Maria Faisst. The film won a Robert Award for Best Children's Film at the 2012 Robert Awards.

== Cast ==
- Frederikke Dahl Hansen as Louise
- Anne Sofie Espersen as Susan
- Kirsten Olesen as Marianne
- Niels Skousen as Henning
- Dar Salim as Hans
- David Dencik as Marcel
- Marco Ilsø as Niclas
- Coco Hjardemaal as Kat
- Victoria Carmen Sonne as Mie
- Søren Christiansen as Mikkel
- Peder Bille as Ung mand på grill
