= Move Me (film) =

2003 film by Morten Arnfred

- Directed by: Morten Arnfred
- Starring: Birthe Neumann; Jesper Lohmann
- Release date: 30 January 2003 (GFF)
- Running time: 95 min
- Country: Denmark
- Language: Danish

Move Me (Danish: Lykkevej) is a 2003 Danish comedy film directed by Morten Arnfred. Birthe Neumann received both a Robert Award for Best Actress in a Leading Role and a Bodil Award for Best Actress in a Leading Role for her role as Sara.

== Cast ==
- Birthe Neumann – Sara
- Jesper Lohmann – Robert
- Ditte Gråbøl – Sus
- Asger Reher – Bo
- Niels Olsen – Holger
- Claus Bue – Jan
- Lykke Sand Michelsen – Amalie
- Jakob Slot Pedersen – Tim
- Klaus Bondam – Henrik
- Tine Miehe-Renard – Anita
- Gyrd Løfqvist – Far
- Litten Hansen – Oldfrue
