= Imperial Theater, Copenhagen =

Cinema in Copenhagen, Denmark

Imperial Biograf
- Imperial
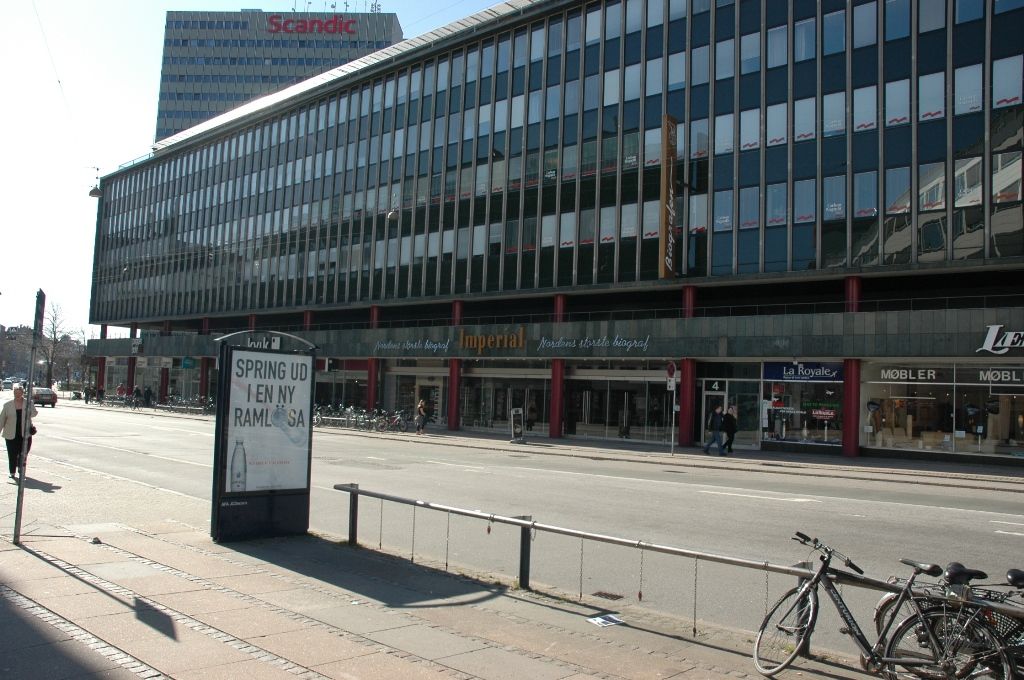
- Front entrance as seen from across the street.
- Interactive map of Imperial Biograf
- Address: Ved Vesterport 4, 1612 København V.
- Coordinates: 55.6753°N 12.5611°E
- Owner: Nordisk Film
- Capacity: 1,002
- Type: Cinema

Construction
- Built: 1961
- Opened: 1 November 1963
- Renovated: September 2013
- Expanded: September 2013
- Cost: 59 million DKK (1959 numbers)

Website
- www.nfbio.dk/biografer/imperial

Imperial has the largest single screen in Northern Europe with 1002 seats. It is among the best cinemas in Copenhagen and is usually the go-to place for cinephiles in the Danish capital. Imperial is owned by Nordisk Film and is located near Vesterport railway station. It has undergone several renewals, the latest of which were completed in September 2013 when Dolby Atmos was installed. It is one of the only big cinemas in Copenhagen which can still project 70 mm film, as well as the only one which can project 4K in 3D.

== Renewals ==
The cinema has undergone several renewals over the years. Among the biggest can be mentioned the change from 1521 to 1179 seats in 1988, with the number of seats being further reduced in 1998 in order to pass the THX-certification. The current projector is Barco's premium model, the DP4K-32B, which was installed in February 2012. This allowed Imperial to project 4K imagery in 3D as the first cinema in Denmark. The latest renewal took place in September 2013 when a new borderless, 40% bigger screen was installed, along with Dolby Atmos and new seats. The number of rows was also reduced from 24 to 21, and the total number of seats went down to 1002.

== Technical details ==
=== Picture ===
The main workhorse is the Barco DP4K-32B which was installed in 2012. In order to continue to support the projection of legacy films, as well as newer movies which are not distributed digitally, Imperial still has one of the two Philips EL4001 DP70's, which were first installed back when it first opened in 1957. The screen itself is 18,4 x 7,7 m, in the Todd-AO format. It is slightly curved and among the absolutely biggest screens in Denmark.

=== Sound ===
Imperial was THX-certified in 1998. The quality of the sound is reaffirmed twice every year by THX-technicians. Due to the hall's special fan-like shape, Imperial has had many problems with the surround sound system. In certain places in the hall, the sound coming from the side speakers can appear to radiate from the corners of the room instead of the sides.

== Sources ==
- Biobookings side med information om hvilke film der går
- Alt om Københavns side
- Nordisk Film
- Artikel om teknikken i Imperial og Palads
- Artikel om installationen af den digitale projektor
- biografmuseet.dk's artikel om Imperial
