= Waltzing Regitze =

1989 film

- Front cover of the Danish DVD for Waltzing Regitze
- Directed by: Kaspar Rostrup
- Written by: Kaspar Rostrup; Martha Christensen (novel)
- Produced by: Lars Kolvig
- Starring: Ghita Nørby; Frits Helmuth; Henning Moritzen
- Cinematography: Claus Loof
- Edited by: Grete Møldrup
- Music by: Fuzzy
- Distributed by: Nordisk Film
- Release date: 17 November 1989
- Running time: 87 minutes
- Country: Denmark
- Language: Danish

Waltzing Regitze (Danish: Dansen med Regitze), also known as Memories of a Marriage, is a 1989 Danish drama film directed by Kaspar Rostrup. Based upon a popular Danish novel by Martha Christensen, the film is an unsentimental portrait of the history and changes of a middle-aged couple's marriage, told through flashbacks during a summer party. The film stars Ghita Nørby and Frits Helmuth.

The film was nominated for the Academy Award for Best Foreign Language Film. In 1990, it won the Robert Award for Film of the Year and swept the Bodil Awards, winning Best Danish Film as well as all four of acting categories.

== Plot ==
The Danish retired couple Karl Aage and Regitze are hosting a summer party for their friends and relatives in their garden cabin. While Regitze is joyfully celebrating, Karl, who is more introverted, sits apart and reminisces about the past 30 years with his wife. He remembers their love at first sight during World War II, living together before marriage, and the challenges they faced, like their mother's opposition to baptizing their son. He recalls moments that showcase Regitze's passionate and open-hearted nature, such as inviting a homeless person and confronting their son's teacher. He also remembers her love for dancing and his fear that his social awkwardness might harm their relationship.

== Cast ==
Actor	Role	Notes
Frits Helmuth	Karl Aage	Mikael Helmuth portrays a young Karl Aage
Ghita Nørby	Regitze	Rikke Bendsen portrays a young Regitze
Henning Moritzen	Børge	Michael Moritzen portrays a young Børge
Anne Werner Thomsen	Ilse	Dorthe Simone Lang portrays a young Ilse
Henning Ditlev	Rikard	Kim Rømer portrays a young Rikard
Birgit Sadolin	Annie	Nanna Møller portrays a young Annie
Hans Henrik Clemensen	John	Peter Zhelder portrays John at 19 years old, while Sylvester Zimsen portrays John at 11–13 years old.
Kirsten Rolffes	Regitze's Mother	
Birgit Zinn	Gloria	
Torben Jensen	Gloria's Husband	
Poul Clemmensen	Jonas	
Tove Maës	Vera	
Lise Kamp Dahlerup	Vibeke	
Sune Kølster	Brian	
Jane Eggertsen	Susan	
Asger Bonfils	Physician	
Else Petersen	Neighbour	
Bolette Schrøder	Funny girl	
Anne Fletting	Smart girl	

== See also ==
- List of submissions to the 62nd Academy Awards for Best Foreign Language Film
- List of Danish submissions for the Academy Award for Best Foreign Language Film
