= 43rd Bodil Awards =

1990 Danish film awards ceremony

- Date: March 1990
- Site: Dagmar, Copenhagen
- Hosted by: Kim Schumacher and Michael Meyerheim

Highlights
- Best Film: Dansen med Regitze
- Best Actor: Frits Helmuth; Dansen med Regitze
- Best Actress: Ghita Nørby; Dansen med Regitze
- Most nominations: Dansen med Regitze(5)

The 43rd Bodil Awards was a historical event as the Danish drama Dansen med Regitze, also known as Memories of a Marriage, directed by Kaspar Rostrup, took all the Danish film related awards available in 1990.

Only two additional awards were given to two foreign films A Short Film About Killing by Krzysztof Kieślowski and Dangerous Liaisons by Stephen Frears.

== Winners and nominees ==
=== Best Actor in a Leading Role ===
Frits Helmuth – Dansen med Regitze

=== Best Actress in a Leading Role ===
Ghita Nørby – Dansen med Regitze

=== Best Actor in a Supporting Role ===
Henning Moritzen – Dansen med Regitze

=== Best Actress in a Supporting Role ===
Kirsten Rolffes – Dansen med Regitze

=== Best European Film ===
A Short Film About Killing

=== Best non-European Film ===
Dangerous Liaisons
