= 10th Bodil Awards =

1957 Danish film awards ceremony

- Date: 1957
- Site: Copenhagen

Highlights
- Best Film: Be Dear to Me
- Best Actor: Peter Malberg; Be Dear to Me
- Best Actress: Birgit Sadolin; Tre piger fra Jylland
- Most awards: Be Dear to Me (2)

The 10th Bodil Awards was held in 1957 in Copenhagen, Denmark, honouring the best in Danish and foreign film of 1956.

The recipient of the Bodil Award for Best Actress in a Leading Role Birgit Sadolin, arrived with from Sønderborg at the last minute to run onto stage and be hailed for her role in Tre piger fra Jylland.

Be Dear to Me directed by Annelise Hovmand, and actor Peter Malberg for his role in the same film, each received an award.

Jørgen Roos got a Bodil Award for Best Documentary for Ellehammerfilmen, and the neighbouring Sweden won Best European Film with Ingmar Bergman's Smiles of a Summer Night.

For the first time, the critics had not been able to choose an American film – U.S. producers had boycotted the Danish market.

== Honorees ==
=== Best Danish Film ===
- Be Dear to Me directed by Annelise Hovmand

=== Best Actor in a Leading Role ===
- Peter Malberg in Be Dear to Me

=== Best Actress in a Leading Role ===
- Birgit Sadolin in Tre piger fra Jylland

=== Best Actor in a Supporting Role ===
- Not awarded

=== Best Actress in a Supporting Role ===
- Not awarded

=== Best European Film ===
- Smiles of a Summer Night directed by Ingmar Bergman

=== Best American Film ===
- Not awarded

=== Best Documentary ===
- Ellehammerfilmen directed by Jørgen Roos
