= Holger Juul Hansen =

Danish actor (1924–2013)

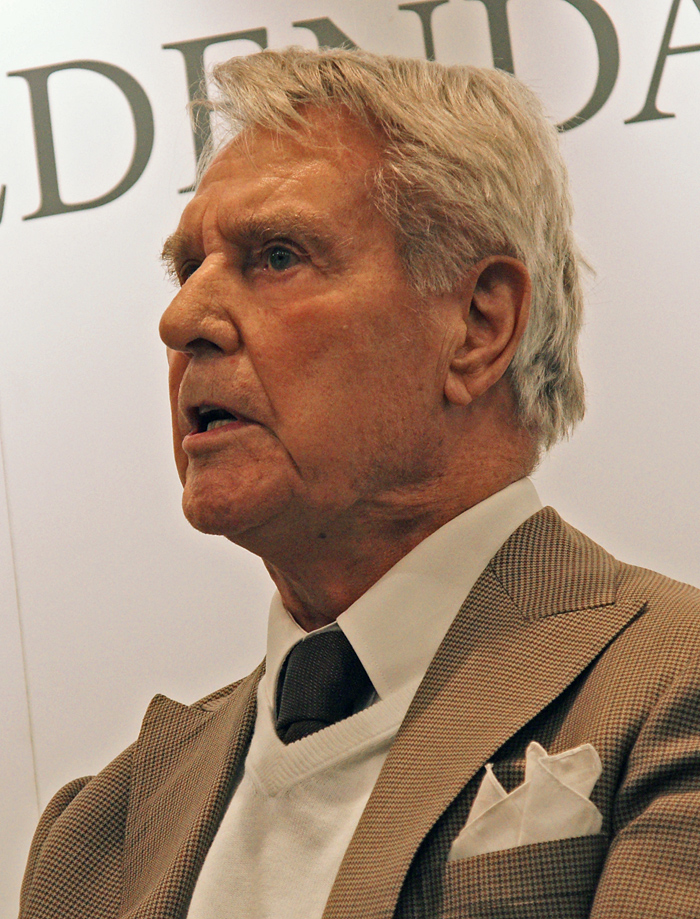
- Born: 14 August 1924; Nyborg, Denmark
- Died: 19 March 2013 (aged 88); Copenhagen, Denmark
- Occupation: Actor
- Years active: 1947–2008

Holger Juul Hansen (14 August 1924 – 19 March 2013) was a Danish actor.

Hansen starred in a large number of Danish movies and television shows. His most prominent roles were as banker Hans Christian Varnæs, head of one of the two rival families in Matador, and as Professor Moesgaard in The Kingdom.

== Selected filmography ==
- Tine (1964)
- Matador – a Danish TV series produced and shown between 1978 and 1982.
- The Kingdom – a Danish television mini-serie created by Lars von Trier.
