= 57th Bodil Awards =

2004 Danish film awards ceremony

- Date: 7 March 2004
- Site: Imperial Cinema, Copenhagen
- Hosted by: Peter Mygind and Mette Horn

Highlights
- Best Film: Dogville
- Best Actor: Ulrich Thomsen; The Inheritance
- Best Actress: Birthe Neumann; Lykkevej
- Most awards: Flammerne på Væggen (2)

The 58th Bodil Awards were held on 7 March 2004 in Imperial Cinema in Copenhagen, Denmark, honouring the best national and foreign films of 2003. Peter Mygind og Mette Horn hosted the event. Lars von Trier's Dogville won the award for Best Danish Film while The Inheritance won the awards for best actor in leading and supporting roles and Lykkevej won the awards for best actress in leading and supporting roles.

== Winners ==
=== Best Danish Film ===
- Dogville
  - Reconstruction
  - Scratch
  - Stealing Rembrandt
  - The Inheritance

=== Best Actor in a Leading Role ===
- Ulrich Thomsen – The Inheritance
  - Lars Brygmann – *Reconstruction
  - Jakob Cedergren – Stealing Rembrandt
  - Mads Mikkelsen – De grønne slagtere
  - John Turturro – Fear X

=== Best Actress in a Leading Role ===
- Birthe Neumann – Lykkevej
  - Stephanie Leòn – Bagland
  - Nicole Kidman – Dogville
  - Maria Bonnevie ' *Reconstruction

=== Best Actor in a Supporting Role ===
- Peter Steen – The Inheritance
  - Jesper Lohmann – Lykkevej
  - Nicolas Bro – Stealing Rembrandt
  - Stellan Skarsgård – Dogville

=== Best Actress in a Supporting Role ===
- Ditte Gråbøl – Lykkevej
  - Bronagh Gallagher – Skagerrak
  - Lisa Werlinder – The *Inheritance

=== Best American Film ===
- Bowling for Columbine
  - The Lord of the Rings: The Two Towers
  - Far From Heaven
  - The Hours
  - Mystic River

=== Best Non-American Film ===
- Goodbye, Lenin!
  - Sweet Sixteen
  - City Of God
  - Guddommelig indgriben
  - Irréversible

=== Bodil Special Award ===
- Anders Refn

== See also ==
- 2004 Robert Awards
