= 6th Bodil Awards =

1953 Danish film awards ceremony

- Date: 1953
- Site: Copenhagen

Highlights
- Best Film: Adam and Eve
- Best Actor: Per Buckhøj; Adam and Eve
- Most nominations: Adam and Eve (2)

The 6th Bodil Awards was held in 1953 in Copenhagen, Denmark, honouring the best in Danish and foreign film of 1952.

Erik Balling received his first Bodil Award for Best Danish Film for his début film Adam and Eve.

Foreign films were represented with Alf Sjöberg's Only a Mother winning the Bodil Award for Best European Film, and Fred Zinnemann's High Noon winning the award for Best American Film.

== Winners ==
=== Best Danish Film ===
- Adam and Eve directed by Erik Balling

=== Best Actor in a Leading Role ===
- Per Buckhøj in Adam and Eve

=== Best Actress in a Leading Role ===
- Not awarded

=== Best Actor in a Supporting Role ===
- Not awarded

=== Best Actress in a Supporting Role ===
- Not awarded

=== Best European Film ===
- Only a Mother directed by Alf Sjöberg

=== Best American Film ===
- High Noon directed by Fred Zinnemann

== Recipients ==
=== Honorary Award ===
- Cinematographer Kjeld Arnholtz for shooting Kriminalsagen Tove Andersen (1953)
