= 44th Bodil Awards =

1991 Danish film awards ceremony

- Date: March 1991
- Site: Imperial, Copenhagen
- Hosted by: Dorthe Friis

Highlights
- Best Film: Lad isbjørnene danse
- Best Actor: Tommy Kenter; Lad isbjørnene danse
- Best Actress: Trine Dyrholm; Springflod
- Most nominations: Lad isbjørnene danse (2)

The 44th Bodil Awards took place in Imperial in Copenhagen.

Two additional awards were given to two foreign films Dekalog by Krzysztof Kieślowski and GoodFellas by Martin Scorsese.

== Winners and nominees ==
=== Best Actor in a Leading Role ===
Tommy Kenter – Lad isbjørnene danse

=== Best Actress in a Leading Role ===
Trine Dyrholm – Springflod

=== Best Actor in a Supporting Role ===
Steen Svare – Sirup

=== Best Actress in a Supporting Role ===
Jannie Faurschou – Springflod

=== Best European Film ===
Dekalog

=== Best non-European Film ===
GoodFellas
