= 1st Bodil Awards =

1948 Danish film awards ceremony

- Date: 1948
- Site: Palace Hotel, Copenhagen

Highlights
- Best Film: Soldaten og Jenny
- Best Actor: Poul Reichhardt; Jenny and the Soldier
- Best Actress: Bodil Kjer; Jenny and the Soldier
- Most awards: Jenny and the Soldier (3)

The 1st Bodil Awards was held at the Palace Hotel's night club Ambassadeur in Copenhagen, Denmark, honoring the best in Danish and foreign film of 1947. Jenny and the Soldier took home three awards, winning Best Danish Film, Best Actor in a Leading Role and Best Actress in a Leading Role. Ta', hvad du vil ha' took home both awards for supporting performances. The event was hosted by Lilian Harvey and Victor Borge.

== Winners and nominees ==
=== Best Danish Film ===
- Soldaten og Jenny – Johan Jacobsen (director)

=== Best Actor in a Leading Role ===
- Poul Reichhardt – Soldaten og Jenny

=== Best Actress in a Leading Role ===
- Bodil Kjer – Soldaten og Jenny

=== Best Actor in a Supporting Role ===
- Ib Schønberg – Ta', hvad du vil ha'

=== Best Actress in a Supporting Role ===
- Ellen Gottschalch – Ta', hvad du vil ha'

=== Best European Film ===
A Matter of Life and Death

=== Best American Film ===
- The Best Years of Our Lives – William Wyler
