= 59th Bodil Awards =

2006 Danish film awards ceremony

- Date: 5 March 2006
- Site: Imperial Cinema, Copenhagen
- Hosted by: Peter Mygind and Mette Horn

Highlights
- Best Film: Manslaughter
- Best Actor: Jesper Christensen; Manslaughter
- Best Actress: Trine Dyrholm; Daisy Diamond
- Most awards: Fluerne på væggen (2)

The 59th Bodil Awards were held on 5 March 2006 in Imperial Cinema in Copenhagen, Denmark, honouring the best national and foreign films of 2005. Peter Mygind og Mette Horn hosted the event. Per Fly's Manslaughter won the award for Best Film. Best Actor in a Leading Role went to Jesper Christensen, the film's protagonist. Trine Dyrholm won Best Actress in a Leading Role for her performance in Fluerne på væggen.

== Winners ==
=== Best Danish Film ===
- Manslaughter
  - Adam's Apples
  - Manderlay
  - Murk
  - Nordkraft

=== Best Actor in a Leading Role ===
- Jesper Christensen
  - Mikael Persbrandt
  - Troels Lyby
  - Thure Lindhardt
  - Bjarne Henriksen

=== Best Actress in a Leading Role ===
- Trine Dyrholm
  - Birthe Neumann
  - Sofie Gråbøl
  - Signe Egholm Olsen

=== Best Actor in a Supporting Role ===
- Nicolas Bro
  - Lin Kun Wu
  - Ali Kazim
  - Nicolas Bro

=== Best Actress in a Supporting Role ===
- Charlotte Fich
  - Tuva Novotny
  - Anne Sophie Byder
  - Pernille Valentin Brandt

=== Best American Film ===
- A History of Violence
  - Brokeback Mountain
  - Broken Flowers
  - Good Night and Good Luck
  - Sideways

=== Best Non-American Film ===
- Der Untergang
  - Sophie Scholl – The Final Days
  - Spring, Summer, Fall, Winter... and Spring
  - Vera Drake, Mike Leigh
  - Wallace & Gromit: The Curse of the Were-Rabbit

=== Best Cinematographer ===
- Manuel Claro – Allegro and Dark Horse

=== Bodil Special Award ===
- Kim Foss and Andreas Steinmann for NatFilm Festival

== See also ==
- 2006 Robert Awards
