= Danish Film Critics Association =

Danish Film Critics Association (Danish: Danske Filmkritikere, until 2013 Filmmedarbejderforeningen) is a film critics association that annually since 1948 have handed out the Bodil Awards.
