= Bodil Awards =

Danish film awards

The Bodil Award
- Awarded for: Excellence in cinematic achievements
- Country: Kingdom of Denmark
- Presented by: Danish Film Critics Association
- First award: 1948; 78 years ago
- Website: www.bodilprisen.dk

The Bodil Awards are the major Danish film awards given by the Danish Film Critics Association. The awards are presented annually at a ceremony in Copenhagen. Established in 1948, it is the oldest film award in Denmark and one of the oldest film awards in Europe. The awards are given without regard to commercial interests or box-office sales, but rather to highlight the films or actors that the critics regard as most worthy.

The name of the award honours two of the most important figures in Danish cinema, actress Bodil Kjer and groundbreaking director Bodil Ipsen. The statuette is made of porcelain, and was designed by Danish artist Ebbe Sadolin and sculpted by Svend Jespersen of Bing & Grøndahl.

== Categories ==
Awards are presented for the following categories:

Merit awards

- Best Danish Film
- Best Actor
- Best Actress
- Best Supporting Actor
- Best Supporting Actress
- Best English Language Film, awarded as Best Non-European Film from 1961 until 1969
- Best Non-English Language Film, awarded as Best European Film from 1961 until 1969
- Best Documentary
- Best Cinematographer
- Best Screenplay, annually since 2015

Special awards

- Honorary Award, since 1951 and pro re nata until 1997; since then annually
- Special Award, annually since 2008

External awards

- Henning Bahs Award, annually since 2012 for excellence in production design
- Arbejdernes Landsbank Talentprisen, annually since 2020 for a young talent

== See also ==
- Robert Awards
