= Nest (2022 film) =

2022 Icelandic short film

- Icelandic: Hreiður
- Directed by: Hlynur Pálmason
- Screenplay by: Hlynur Pálmason
- Produced by: Anton Máni Svansson; Katrin Pors; Eva Jakobsen; Mikkel Jersin
- Starring: Ída Mekkín Hlynsdóttir; Grímur Hlynsson; Þorgils Hlynsson
- Cinematography: Hlynur Pálmason
- Edited by: Julius Krebs Damsbo
- Music by: Alex Zhang Hungtai
- Production companies: Join Motion Pictures; Snowglobe
- Distributed by: New Europe Film Sales
- Release date: 14 February 2022 (Berlin)
- Running time: 22 minutes
- Language: Icelandic

Nest (Icelandic: Hreiður) is an Icelandic short film written and directed by Hlynur Pálmason and released in 2022. The story follows siblings building a tree house together over the course of a year. It was filmed by Hlynur right outside his house over a period of 18 months, with the support and assistance of his three children.

Nest premiered at the Berlin International Film Festival on 14 February 2022. It won a number of film festival awards that year. At the Odense International Film Festival, Nest won Best Danish Short Film, and was nominated as Short Film Candidate for the 35th European Film Awards.Nest was nominated for the Zabaltegi-Tabakalera Prize at the San Sebastián International Film Festival, which was won by another of Hlynur's films, Godland. Nest also won the Grande Prémio Competição Internacional at the Vila do Conde International Short Film Festival.

Nest was released on the streaming service MUBI as part of their Best of 2022 series.
