= A Painter (film) =

- En maler
- Directed by: Hlynur Pálmason
- Written by: Hlynur Pálmason
- Produced by: Julie Waltersdorph Hansen
- Starring: Ingvar Eggert Sigurðsson; Elliott Crosset Hove
- Cinematography: Maria Von Hausswolff
- Edited by: Julius Krebs Damsbo
- Release date: 2013
- Running time: 30 minutes
- Country: Denmark
- Language: Danish

A Painter (Danish: En maler) is a 2013 Danish short film written and directed by Hlynur Pálmason, starring Ingvar Eggert Sigurðsson and Elliott Crosset Hove. The film follows a famous yet solitary painter whose peace and quiet is disrupted by the sudden arrival of his son and other outsiders.

A Painter was written and filmed in Skagen, the northernmost town of Denmark, and won the award for the Best Danish Short Film at the Odense Film Festival. The film was made as Pálmason's graduation short from the Danish National Film School, marking his first collaboration with the actor Sigurðsson who has also acted in Pálmason's later films, including A White, White Day (2019) and Godland (2022).

== Cast ==
- Ingvar Eggert Sigurðsson as maler (painter)
- Elliott Crosset Hove as søn (son)
- Ida Cæcilie Rasmussen as kvinde (woman)
- Peter Sloth Madsen as interviewer
- Mads Riisom as photographer
