= Night Walk =

Night Walk may refer to:

- Night Walk (novel), a 1967 SF novel by Bob Shaw
- Night Walk (TV series), a late-night television program seen in Ontario on CIII-TV from 1986 to 1993
- Night Walk (film), a 2019 American film directed by Aziz Tazi
- "Night Walk", a track from Belle & Sebastian's 2002 album, Storytelling
- "Night Walk", a track from Dirty Beaches's 2013 album, Drifters/Love is the Devil
