= Crush the Skull =

- Theatrical release poster
- Directed by: Viet Nguyen
- Written by: Chris Dinh; Viet Nguyen
- Produced by: Aya Tanimura; Jimmy Tsai
- Starring: Chris Dinh; Katie Savoy; Chris Riedell; Tim Chiou; Lauren Reeder; Walter Michael Bost
- Cinematography: Tuan Quoc Le; John Reyes-Nguyen
- Edited by: Viet Nguyen
- Music by: David Frank Long
- Production companies: Cherry Sky Films; Ninja Crush
- Distributed by: Breaking Glass Pictures
- Release dates: 11 June 2015 (Los Angeles Film Festival); 13 May 2016 (United States)
- Running time: 83 minutes
- Country: United States
- Language: English

Crush the Skull is a 2015 American black comedy horror thriller film directed by Viet Nguyen, written by Nguyen and Dinh, and starring Chris Dinh, Katie Savoy, Chris Riedell, Tim Chiou, Lauren Reeder, and Walter Michael Bost.

== Cast ==
- Chris Dinh as Ollie
- Katie Savoy as Blair
- Chris Riedell as Connor
- Tim Chiou as Riley
- Lauren Reeder as Vivian
- Devyn Stokdyk as Young Vivian
- Walter Michael Bost as Killer
- Lincoln Hoppe as Sheriff Dennis
- Nathan Moore as Officer Gabbe
- Leonard Wu as Koji Miller
- Jerry Ying as Yoji Miller
- Michelle Grondine as Torture Video Victim
- Katrina Nelson as Mom
- Justin Ray as Boy Toy

== Plot summary ==
A young girl is shown to be chained to a bed in a concrete room. A woman, revealed to be her mother, breaks into the room and shakily reassures her they will get out, only to be stabbed in the stomach in the doorway. She tries to stop her attacker from getting to the girl; the attacker stabs her again and moves to the girl while she screams.

Next, we see couple Ollie and Blair, two career criminals preparing for their last heist, robbing a large house. They laugh and joke as they rob the house, only to have the apparent owners come home ahead of schedule. Panicking, they hide in an upstairs bedroom closet as the couple come into that same room and proceed to get busy. Suddenly, another person comes in the house, revealed to be the woman's husband. He comes into the room, in a rage and holding a gun. Through a series of unfortunate events, both the wife's lover and the two thieves are discovered, with Ollie and Blair getting away in the chaos. Hearing the screaming and gunshots, Ollie has a change of heart and goes to try and help the wife and lover, only to find them shot dead and the husband futiely clicking the empty gun under his chin. The police then arrive and capture Ollie with Blair speeding off.

Blair later bails Ollie out, using the last of their money and putting them back in debt to a crime boss named Timmy Song, putting them in the crime business once more. Desperate, they take a seemingly easy heist of a vacation home with Blair's brother Connor and his dim-witted companion Riley. Connor and Ollie share a mutual hatred of each other due to jobs going wrong in the past, but Connor grudgingly lets him come along at the behest of his sister, but only as lookout.

During the job, Connor, Blair and Riley go inside and Ollie loses radio contact with them, deciding to go in after them through the skylight they used after hearing screams. With everyone inside, they discover the house is barren of any valuables or essentials, all doors and windows are locked from the outside, the windows are bulletproof and a jammer is blocking their communications. Even worse, they discover a television in the basement playing home recordings of a woman being tortured with many other recordings labeled with peoples names nearby.

When Ollie wonders how Connor didn't know all this about the house, Blair reveals that Connor lied about knowing the ins and out of the house they're in, mostly because he was too lazy to scope the place out properly. Frustrated at his and Riley's ineptitude, Ollie and Blair take over as leaders with a plan to find the jammer, disable it and phone out for help. As they search, there are glimpses of a man walking in the house unseen, and the group see the skylight has been shut. In the basement, Ollie finds a secret passage leading to a labyrinthine underground facility lined with automatic doors. They find the jammer deeper in and disable it, calling out to 911 but are unsure if it sent through. Hearing a sound, they find a woman named Vivian held prisoner in a large glass box. The group gets separated by an automatic door, Connor and Riley with the girl and Ollie and Blair going to get a better signal.

After releasing her, the traumatized Vivian tearfully reveals the one who imprisoned her did horrible things to her and will kill them. Another door opens and she runs through it with Connor chasing after, getting separated from Riley. Ollie and Blair hear Riley struggling with someone beyond the door, unable to help. The door opens revealing Riley slashed up badly, keeling over. They try to help but Riley ends up getting his head cut off and Blair falls through a sudden opening in the wall, Ollie following behind as it closes.

They end up in the killer's torture room, full of chains, handcuffs and bloody trays, but can only find a tiny pocketknife to defend themselves. Vivian suddenly stumbles through another opening, saying she and Connor got separated; Blair is skeptical of her trustworthiness, noticing a fresh pedicure on her feet despite Vivian saying she's been trapped for weeks. Another door separates Ollie from the girls, who hear Connor get killed in the room next to them.

A security screen in Ollie's room shows a sheriff has arrived at the house. With the killer, identifying as Jack Tucker to the sheriff, distracted, the three downstairs get the door open, reunite and make their way out. Vivian collapses, and unable to get her up, Ollie and Blair leave her and run out to Jack and the sheriff who was just about to leave. Jack claims they were robbing him and holding him hostage, but Vivian makes her way outside vouching for Blair and Ollie, only to stab the sheriff and shoot at them with his gun. Blair and Ollie get back inside and watch as Vivian and Jack stab the sheriff to death.

As they try and figure out what to do, Connor suddenly shows up and ushers them back downstairs, having survived his attack by playing possum. He then shows them the control room for all the doors and security cameras, revealing a room with a potential escape route, but Ollie instead rallies them to stay and take them out to stop their killing spree. Connor says he has a plan.

With Connor manning the doors, Ollie and Blair separate Vivian and Jack, with Jack going after the couple and Vivian coming for Connor. Vivian manages to crack the control room door and shoots at Connor, only for it to be a decoy as Connor douses Vivian's face and arm with poison from their corpse disposal room, sending her running away screaming.

Ollie and Blair struggle with Jack before managing to hang him by a cord in the torture room, reuniting with Connor afterwards. Vivian appears and runs screaming at them, only for Ollie to manage to slash her throat with the tiny pocketknife. Before leaving, Blair decides they need to crush Jacks head with a large pipe to make sure he's dead. Jack grabs Ollie's foot and Ollie swings for his head as the screen cuts to black.

An old home video of the girl from the opening plays, showing Jack feeding her parts of her mother and her saying it tastes good. He asks her name and she answers 'Macy'. He then says her name is now Vivian and the screen cuts to black one last time.

== Release ==
The film premiered at the 2015 Los Angeles Film Festival, where it won the Nightfall Award.

== Reception ==
Martin Tsai of the Los Angeles Times wrote that the film is "Easily the most thrilling thriller in recent memory", and that it "recalls the snappy meta horrors of the mid-1990s almost as though the glut of formulaic straight-to-VOD throwaways circa the mid-2000s never happened."

Timothy Tau of IndieWire gave the film a rating of "B+" and wrote, "Extremely entertaining and well-crafted, Crush The Skull promises a bright future in genre films for Nguyen."

Frank Scheck of The Hollywood Reporter wrote that despite the film's "formulaic and derivative aspects" and the "overzealous camerawork that is far more busy than effective", it is "fun at times, thanks to the frequently witty dialogue delivered by the performers in deadpan fashion."
