= Christopher Makoto Yogi =

American filmmaker

Christopher Makoto Yogi is an American filmmaker from Hawaiʻi, best known for his feature films August at Akiko's (2018) and I Was a Simple Man (2021), which premiered at major international film festivals and received critical recognition.

== Career ==
Yogi's debut feature film, August at Akiko's, premiered at the International Film Festival Rotterdam in 2018 and received positive reviews. The film stars Alex Zhang Hungtai and was released theatrically by Factory 25. It was listed among the best films of 2019 by Richard Brody in The New Yorker.

His subsequent feature, I Was a Simple Man, starring Constance Wu, premiered in the U.S. Dramatic Competition at the 2021 Sundance Film Festival. The project participated in the Sundance Screenwriters and Directors Labs and was released theatrically by Strand Releasing. It won the Grand Jury Prize at the San Diego Asian Film Festival, the Made in Hawaiʻi Award at the Hawaiʻi International Film Festival, and was listed as the fourth-best film of 2021 by The New Yorker.

Yogi's experimental work has screened at the Museum of Modern Art and Flaherty NYC. His short films include Occasionally, I Saw Glimpses of Hawaiʻi and Obake (Ghosts).

== Filmography ==
Film credits
Year	Title	Credited as	Notes
2009	Layover, on the Shore	Director, co-writer	Short film
2011	Obake	Director, writer, editor	Short film
2016	Occasionally, I Saw Glimpses of Hawaiʻi	Director, editor	Short film
2018	August at Akiko's	Director, writer, editor	
2021	I Was a Simple Man	Director, writer, editor	
