= Hlynur Pálmason =

Icelandic film director and screenwriter

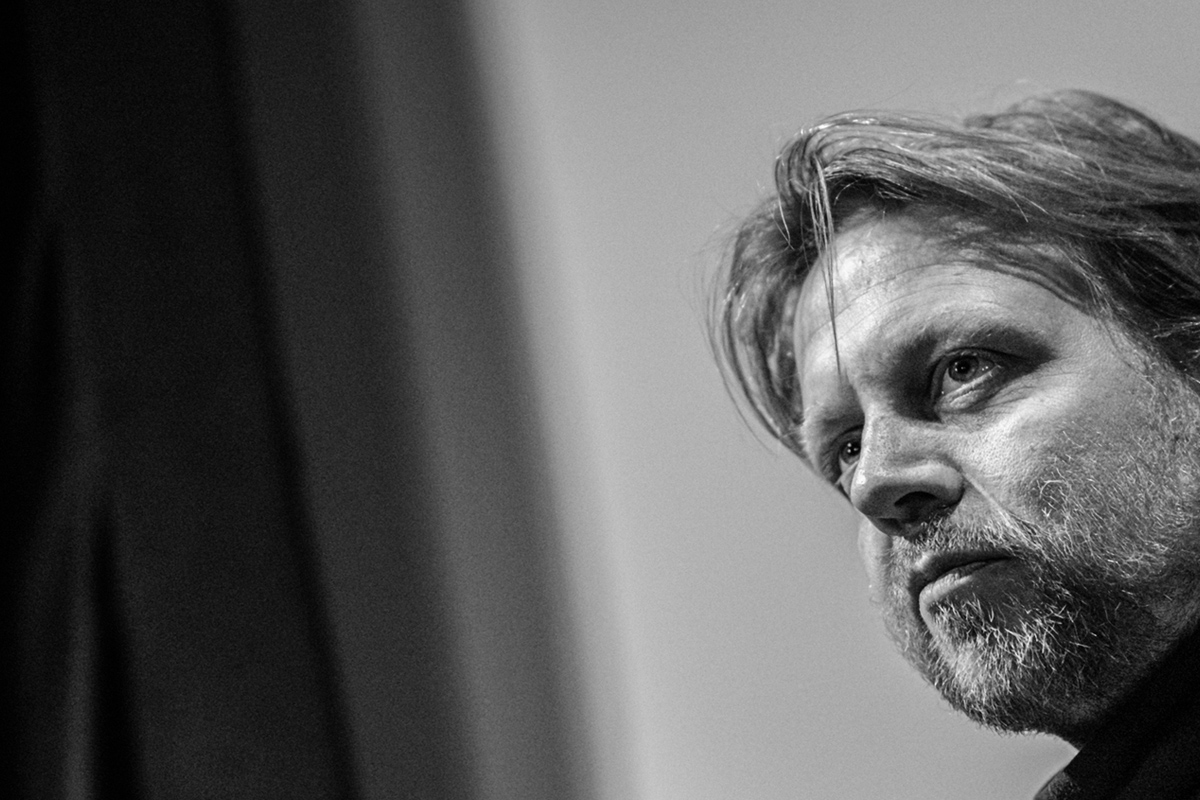
- Øst for Paradis cinema (Denmark 2025); Photo Hreinn Gudlaugsson
- Born: 1984 (age 41–42); Höfn í Hornafirði, Iceland
- Occupations: Film director, screenwriter, producer
- Years active: 2012–present
- Awards: Edda Award for Best Director

Hlynur Pálmason (born 1984) is an Icelandic film director, screenwriter, and visual artist. He is most known for his feature film works made in Iceland and Denmark, including Winter Brothers (2017) and Godland (2022).

== Early life and education ==
Hlynur Pálmason was born in 1984 in Höfn í Hornafirði, Iceland. He studied film at the National Film School of Denmark in Copenhagen, graduating in 2013. He lived in Denmark for 10 years before returning to Höfn, a town on the Hornafjörður fjord. He is also a visual artist.

== Career ==
Pálmason has said he is more interested in "the narrative style and flow of films" than the actual plotline.

His debut feature film Winter Brothers (Vinterbrødre), which was filmed in Denmark, debuted at the Locarno Film Festival in Switzerland in 2017. It went on to win the Bodil Award for Best Danish Film and the Robert Award for Best Danish Film, with Pálmason also winning the Robert Award for Best Director.

His second feature film, A White, White Day (Hvítur, Hvítur Dagur), was filmed in Iceland, and many of the people he had worked with on Winter Brothers were also employed for this film, including the Swedish cinematographer Maria von Hausswolff, editor Julius Krebs Damsbo, and sound designer Lars Halvorsen. He had previously collaborated with Icelandic actor Ingvar Sigurðsson on the short film he made for graduation, A Painter, in 2013. A White White Day was selected to screen in the Critics' Week section at the 2019 Cannes Film Festival, and was selected as Iceland's submission for the Academy Award for Best International Feature Film at the 92nd Academy Awards in 2020.

He followed up in 2022 with Godland (Vanskabte Land), which premiered at the 2022 Cannes Film Festival and was selected as Denmark's 2022 submission for the Nordic Council Film Prize. The film, its director, and several actors were nominated for many awards and won a number of them, including Gold Hugo for Best Feature Film at the Chicago Film Festival and Best Feature Film at the Riga International Film Festival in Latvia.

Pálmason won Director of the Year at Iceland's 2023 Edda Awards.

== Filmography ==
=== Feature films ===
Year	English Title	Original Title	Notes
2017	Winter Brothers	Vinterbrødre	
2019	A White, White Day	Hvítur, hvítur dagur	
2022	Godland	Volaða land	
2025	The Love That Remains	Ástin sem eftir er	
2025	Joan of Arc	Jóhanna af Örk	
TBA	On Land and Sea	Á landi og sjó	Post-production

=== Short films ===
Year	English Title	Original Title	Notes
2012	A Day or Two	En dag eller to	
2013	A Painter	En maler	
2014	Seven Boats	Sjö bátar	
2022	Nest	Hreiður	

== Personal life ==
Pálmason's daughter is Ída Mekkín Hlynsdóttir, who plays significant roles in both A White White Day and Godland.
