= Stateless (Dirty Beaches album) =

Studio album by Dirty Beaches
- Released: November 4, 2014
- Recorded: Lisbon, Portugal
- Length: 41:08
- Label: Zoo Music

Dirty Beaches chronology
Drifters/Love Is The Devil (2013)	Stateless (2014)

Professional ratings
Aggregate scores
Source	Rating
AnyDecentMusic?	6.3/10
Metacritic	67/100
Review scores
Source	Rating
Consequence of Sound	C
DIY Magazine	3/5 stars
Exclaim!	7/10
NME	3/5 stars
Pitchfork	7.6/10

Stateless is the sixth and final studio album by Dirty Beaches. It was released on November 4, 2014 under Zoo Music.

The four-track album is an instrumental piece, and features Italian composer Vittorio Demarin.

== Critical reception ==
Stateless was met with generally favorable reviews from critics. At Metacritic, which assigns a weighted average rating out of 100 to reviews from mainstream publications, this release received an average score of 67, based on 7 reviews.

== Track listing ==
Stateless track listing
No.	Title	Length
1.	"Displaced"	7:26
2.	"Stateless"	11:21
3.	"Pacific Ocean"	7:27
4.	"Time Washes Away Everything"	14:54
