= Shit. Meet. Fan. =

2024 play by Robert O'Hara

- Original language: English
- Written by: Robert O'Hara
- Subject: technology, divorce, white privilege, homosexuality, race relations, cheating
- Genre: Comedy-drama
- Setting: 2020's New York City

Premiere
- Date: 10 October 2024
- Place: New York City
- Directed by: Robert O'Hara
- Official website

Shit. Meet. Fan. is a domestic comedy-drama play written and directed by Robert O'Hara. The play is based on the 2016 Italian film Perfect Strangers directed by Paolo Genovese. The production opened in previews on 10 October 2024 at the Robert W. Wilson Theater which was produced by MCC Theater Off-Broadway. The original cast includes Neil Patrick Harris, Jane Krakowski, Debra Messing, and Constance Wu.

== Background ==
O'Hara based the play on the 2016 Italian film Perfect Strangers directed by Paolo Genovese.

== Summary ==
The show is a domestic comedic drama, and exploration into the relationships between three couples and the secrets they have behind their phones. One night at a party to watch an eclipse, they play a game in which they place their phones on the table and have to read aloud or show every text or message that comes in on their phone.

== Cast ==
Role	MCC Theater, Off-Broadway October 2024
Roger	Neil Patrick Harris
Eve	Jane Krakowski
Claire	Debra Messing
Brett	Garret Dillahunt
Frank	Michael Oberholtzer
Hannah	Constance Wu
Logan	Tramell Tillman
Sam	Genevieve Hannelius

== Productions ==
The play began previews on Off-Broadway at The Robert W. Wilson MCC Theater Space on October 10, 2024, with opening night initially set for October 28. On August 27, 2024, it was announced that Garret Dillahunt, Billy Magnussen, Debra Messing, and Constance Wu would star in the production. On September 3, 2024, it was announced that Neil Patrick Harris and Jane Krakowski would join the cast. On October 8 it announced a second extension through December 15, 2024. On October 23, 2024, it was announced that Magnussen had withdrawn from the production during previews due to an "unforeseen health concern". He was replaced by Michael Oberholtzer, and the play's opening night was moved to November 18.
