= Constance Wu =

American actress (born 1982)

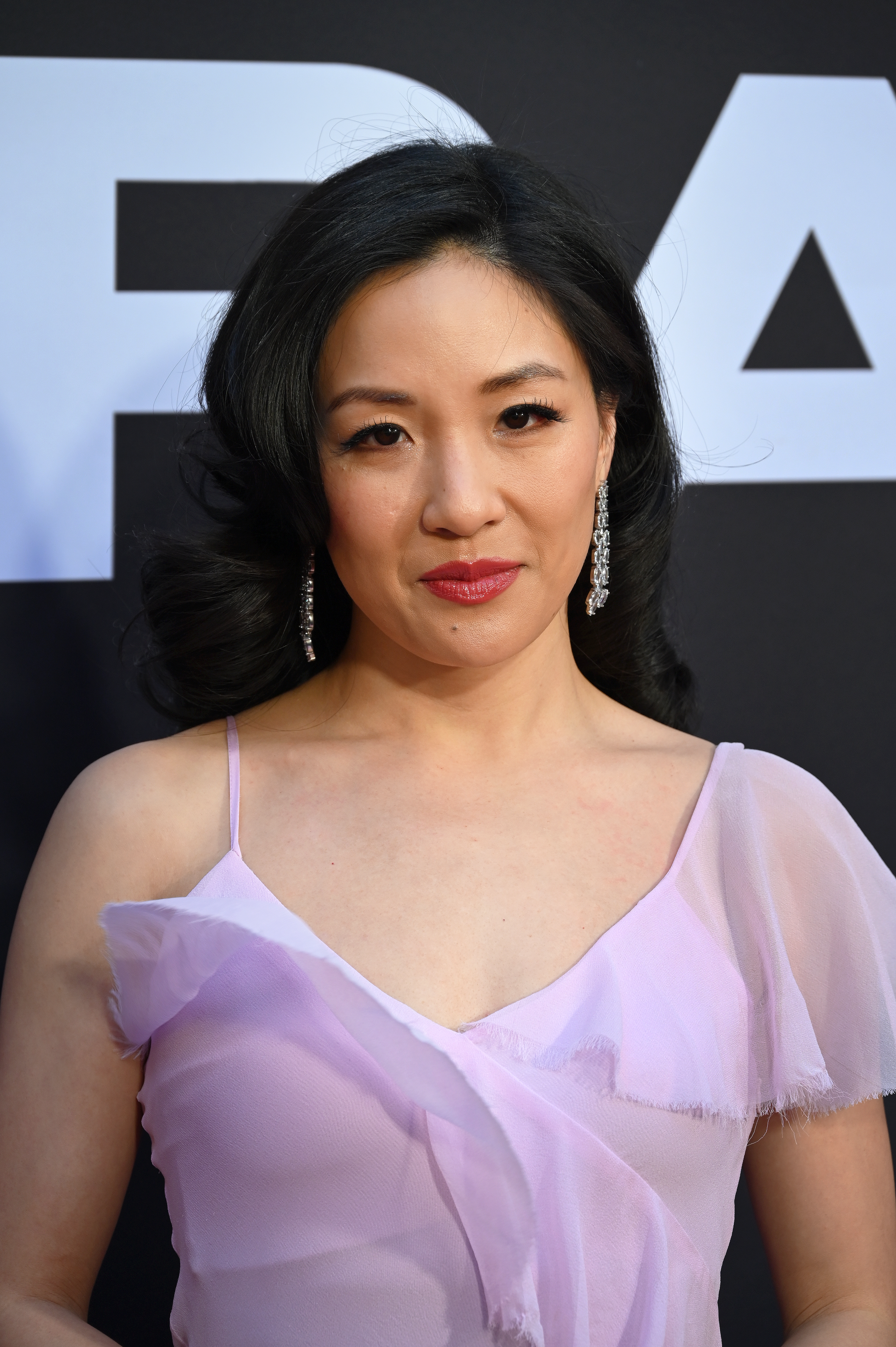
- Wu in 2025
- Born: March 22, 1982 (age 44); Richmond, Virginia, U.S.
- Education: State University of New York, Purchase (BFA)
- Occupation: Actress
- Years active: 2006–present
- Partner: Ryan Kattner
- Children: 2

Chinese name
- Traditional Chinese: 吳恬敏
- Simplified Chinese: 吴恬敏
Transcriptions
Standard Mandarin
- Hanyu Pinyin: Wú Tiánmǐn
- Wade–Giles: Wu^{2} T'ien^{2}-min^{3}
- IPA: [ǔ tʰjɛ̌n.mìn]
Southern Min
- Hokkien POJ: Gô͘ Tiām-bín

Constance Tianming Wu (Chinese: 吳恬敏; born March 22, 1982) is an American actress. Wu's breakthrough role came with the ABC sitcom Fresh Off the Boat (2015–2020), which earned her four nominations at the Critics' Choice Television Awards. For leading the romantic comedy-drama film Crazy Rich Asians (2018) as Rachel Chu, she became the fourth Asian woman to be nominated for the Golden Globe Award for Best Actress in a Motion Picture – Musical or Comedy.

Wu has appeared in the crime film Hustlers (2019), the musical film Lyle, Lyle, Crocodile (2022), and the drama film The Friend (2024). Her television roles include the web series EastSiders (2012–2017) and the Amazon Prime action thriller series The Terminal List (2022). She also voiced Daphne Blake in the Max animated series Velma (2023–2024). On stage, Wu acted in the Los Angeles production of 2:22 A Ghost Story (2022) and off Broadway productions of the rock musical Little Shop of Horrors (2023) and the comedy-drama play Shit. Meet. Fan. (2024).

She was included on Time magazine's list of the 100 most influential people in the world in 2017. Her 2022 memoir, Making a Scene, detailed her experiences with sexual harassment, cyberbullying, and psychotherapy.

== Early life and education ==
Constance Tianming Wu was born in Richmond, Virginia, to a Taiwanese immigrant family. She is the third of four daughters. Her father, Fang-Sheng Wu, is a biology and genetics professor at Virginia Commonwealth University, and her mother is a computer programmer. Wu said that her paternal grandparents were very poor, working as bamboo farmers, and did not have the opportunity to get an education, so they were unable to read and write.

She graduated from Douglas S. Freeman High School, in Henrico County, Virginia, where she performed in local theatre. She participated in a six-month program during high school at the Lee Strasberg Theatre and Film Institute. Wu later graduated from State University of New York at Purchase's Conservatory of Theatre Arts with a Bachelor of Fine Arts in acting in 2005.

After college, Wu studied psycholinguistics in New York for three semesters of post-bachelor studies. She then applied to and was accepted by Columbia University to pursue graduate studies in speech pathology. Before she entered Columbia, however, Wu decided to leave New York to continue acting and moved to Los Angeles. She has cited Academy Award-winning director Ang Lee as an influence.

== Career ==
=== 2006–2016: Early work and Fresh Off the Boat ===
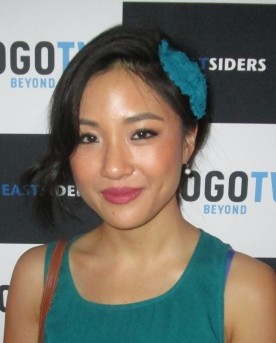
Wu in August 2015

In New York City, Wu got roles onstage and in independent films. She made her screen debut with a supporting role in Stephanie Daley (2006). She later had supporting roles in Year of the Fish and The Architect. On television, she appeared in episodes of Law & Order: Special Victims Unit, Torchwood, and Covert Affairs and had a recurring role as Laudine Lee on the ABC soap opera One Life to Live in 2007. In an interview, Wu stated that she impulsively moved to Los Angeles from New York in 2010 after a heartbreak. In Los Angeles, she was cast in Sound of My Voice, directed by Zal Batmanglij. From 2012 to 2017, Wu starred in the web series EastSiders, which won two Indie Series Awards, both for Best Ensemble - Drama in 2014 and 2016. She was also nominated for two Indie Series Awards, one for Best Supporting Actress - Drama and the other for Best Guest Actress - Drama in those same years.

In 2015, Wu participated in Sundance Screenwriters' Lab with two emerging Asian-American directors, Yung Chang and Christopher Yogi, in what she felt was a unique opportunity to support fellow Asian storytellers. In 2014, after landing a role in one unsuccessful comedy pilot, Wu won the lead role in the ABC comedy series Fresh Off the Boat alongside Randall Park. The series is loosely based on the life of chef and food personality Eddie Huang and his book Fresh Off the Boat: A Memoir. The series premiered in 2015, and Wu received critical acclaim for her performance. E! named her a breakout star of the 2014–15 television season. For her role as Jessica Huang, she received four nominations for the Critics' Choice Television Award for Best Actress in a Comedy Series, tying with Amy Poehler as the second most nominated actress in the category behind Julia Louis-Dreyfus. She was also nominated for two TCA Awards for Individual Achievement in Comedy.

=== 2017–present: Film breakthrough and stage work ===
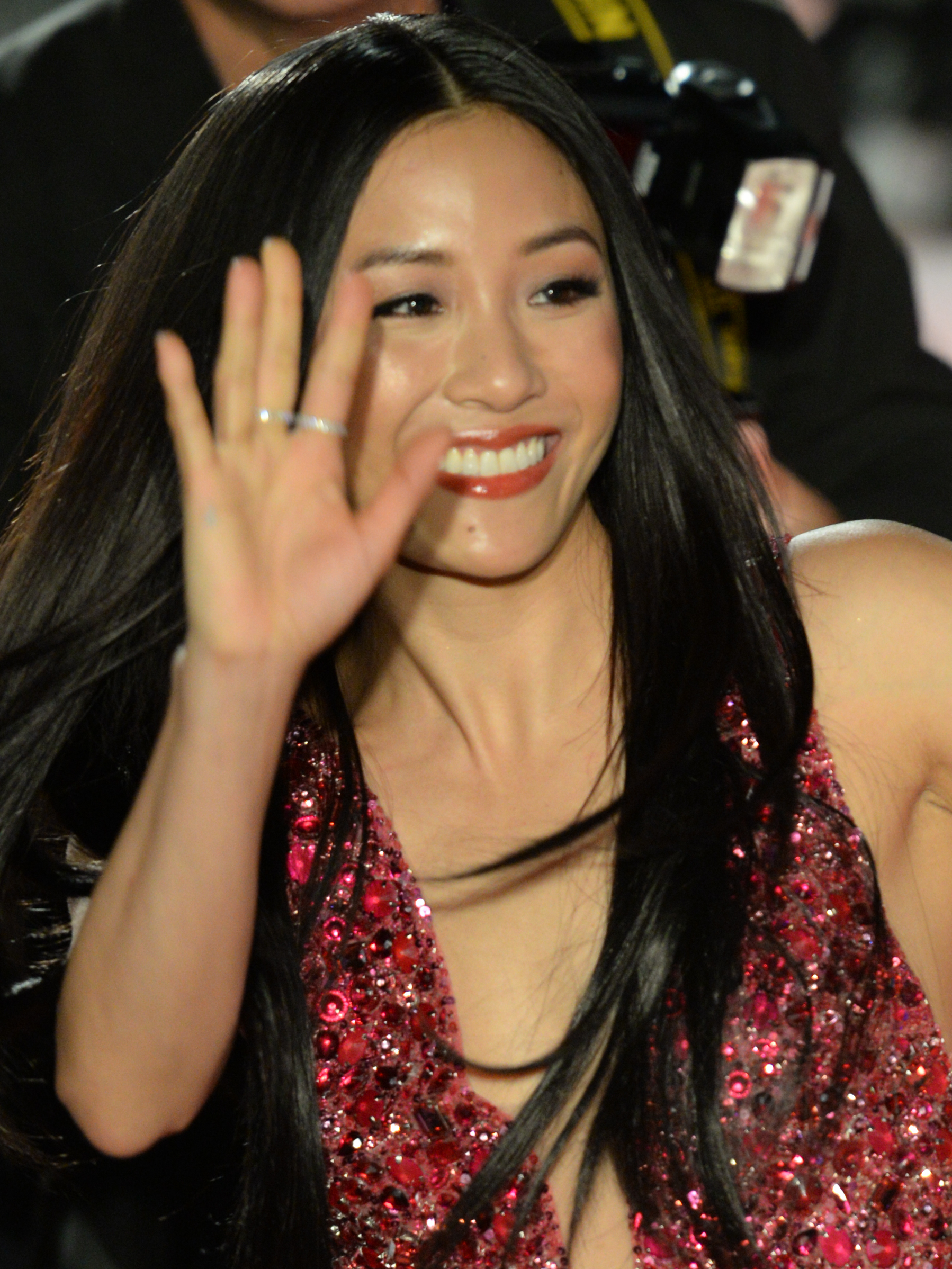
Wu at the TIFF premiere of Hustlers in 2019

In 2017, she appeared in the Hulu anthology series, Dimension 404, and was included on the annual Time 100 list of the most influential people in the world. In February 2017, Wu was cast as the female lead in Jon M. Chu's adaptation of Crazy Rich Asians, based on the bestselling novel of the same name by Kevin Kwan. The film was released in the United States and Canada on August 15, 2018, by Warner Bros., and was the first major Hollywood studio film to feature an all-Asian cast since 1993's The Joy Luck Club. The film was a critical and commercial success, and emerged as the highest-grossing romantic comedy in a decade, grossing over $238 million. Wu received critical acclaim for her performance and was nominated for a Golden Globe Award, a Screen Actors Guild Award, a Satellite Award, two Critics' Choice Movie Awards, and two NAACP Image Awards. She is the first Asian woman in over 40 years to be nominated for the Golden Globe Award for Best Actress in a Motion Picture – Musical or Comedy, and the fourth-ever female Asian nominee. Wu is signed on to reprise her role as Rachel Chu in both sequels to Crazy Rich Asians titled China Rich Girlfriend and Rich People Problems, which were originally set for back-to-back filming in 2020, although production on them has not yet begun.

In November 2018, Wu starred in a short animated film Crow: The Legend as Skunk. The following year, the actress starred alongside Jennifer Lopez in the crime comedy film Hustlers, which follows a group of former strippers in Manhattan who rob wealthy men. Wu worked at a strip club undercover to prepare for the role. The film opened on September 13, 2019, and became a box office success, grossing over $157 million worldwide and receiving positive reviews from critics. Also in 2019, Wu starred in the independent drama film I Was a Simple Man. In June 2019, it was announced that Wu would play the lead role in a film titled Goodbye Vitamin, based on the debut novel of Rachel Khong. The film will be distributed by Universal Pictures and Wu will serve as an executive producer on the film.

In March 2021, Wu was cast in the Amazon Prime thriller series The Terminal List. More recently, she signed a first look TV deal with Entertainment One. She plays Mrs. Primm in the new movie Lyle, Lyle, Crocodile, which was released in theaters October 7, 2022. In late 2022, she starred in the U.S. debut of the play 2:22 A Ghost Story at the Ahmanson Theatre in Los Angeles. In 2023, she had a recurring voice role as Daphne Blake in the Max animated series Velma created by Mindy Kaling. That same year she acted in the horror comedy rock musical Little Shop of Horrors opposite Corbin Bleu off Broadway . In 2024 she acted in the drama film The Friend alongside Naomi Watts and Bill Murray. On August 26, 2024, it was announced that Wu has joined the cast of Shit. Meet. Fan. alongside Neil Patrick Harris, Jane Krakowski, and Debra Messing in an off Broadway play written and directed by Robert O'Hara.

In October 2024, Wu was announced as a producer for a potential limited series based upon R. F. Kuang's 2023 novel Yellowface that had been optioned by Lionsgate Television. In December 2025, she was a guest narrator at Disney's Candlelight Processional at Walt Disney World.

On October 8, 2026, it was announced that Crazy Rich Asians will be adapted into a TV series sand Constance Wu will return as Rachel Chu.

== Other ventures ==
=== Activism and philanthropy ===
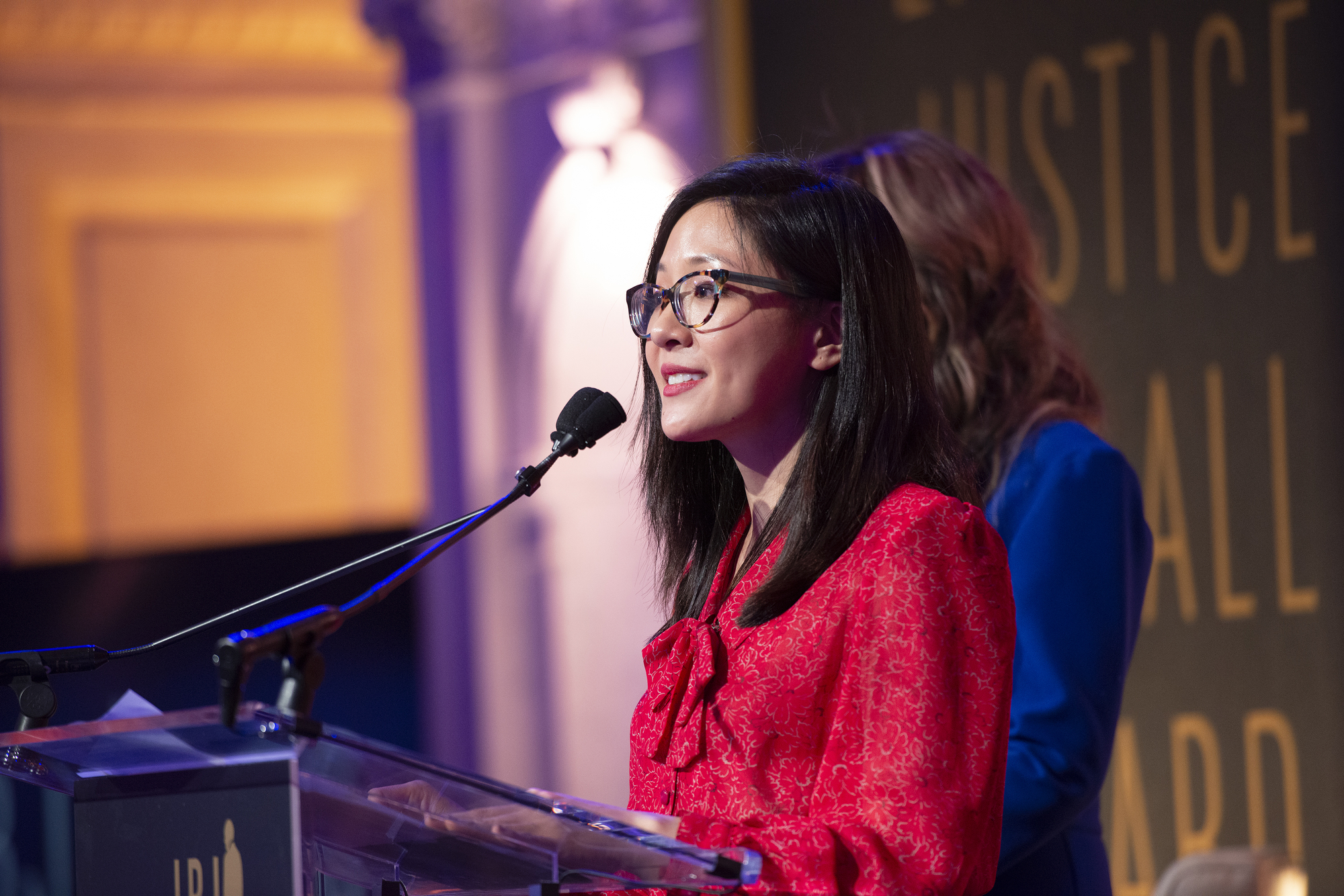
Wu in 2020

Wu is an activist regarding Asian representation in American media and has expressed her support for bringing more diversity into the film industry. Wu has shared her stories regarding times that she had been denied roles due to her racial background, and stated her hopes that her success would pave more paths for diverse representation in the Aman film industry. The #StarringConstanceWu hashtag meme, adopted by Asian-American activists, inserts Wu's image into film promotional materials in order to highlight the lack of actors of Asian descent in starring roles.

In 2017, Wu worked with Miry's List, an organization that provides essential kits to newly arrived immigrants and refugee families in Southern California, stating in an interview with Teen Vogue that she wants to be active in her care of "people with the courage to make an immigrant journey in search of peace, safety and well-being for their families."

In 2023, Wu was one of the actors to sign an open letter praising President Joe Biden advocating for the release of the October 7th hostages. She signed alongside Gal Gadot, Bradley Cooper, Madonna, Bob Odenkirk, Taika Waititi, Tyler Perry, and Zoe Saldaña.

=== Writing ===
Wu released her first book, the memoir Making a Scene, in October 2022. In it, she claimed to have experienced date rape in her twenties.

== Personal life ==
=== Relationships and children ===
Wu lives in Brooklyn in New York. In December 2011, Wu met actor Ben Hethcoat, whom she dated until February 2018. In November 2018, Wu spoke out about online harassment and criticism she had received for dating Hethcoat, who is white. In August 2020, Wu gave birth to her first child, a girl, with her boyfriend Ryan Kattner, frontman of the band Man Man. On February 21, 2023, Wu announced her second pregnancy in an Instagram story, and on July 20, 2023, she revealed she gave birth to her second child, a son.

=== Mental health, cyberbullying and harassment ===
In May 2019, after Fresh Off the Boat was renewed for its sixth and final season, Wu made several social media posts expressing her unhappiness with the renewal, including commenting "Dislike" on the show's Instagram post announcing the renewal and tweeting, "So upset right now that I'm literally crying. Ugh. Fuck". Several days later, Wu clarified that she had been angry at the show's renewal because it had forced her to drop out of another project that she was "really passionate about," one that would have been an artistic challenge compared to her role in Fresh Off the Boat. She further stated that she loved her cast mates and harbored no animosity towards them. The posts sparked backlash on social media.

In July 2022, Wu revealed that the controversy, and specifically several private messages from "a fellow Asian actress" who told Wu that she had "become a blight on the Asian American community", had prompted her to attempt suicide; she was found by a friend and saved. Wu abstained from social media for the subsequent three years and decreased her acting workload to "focus on [her] mental health", which included entering psychotherapy.

In September 2022, Wu stated in interviews that she was the target of sexual harassment by an unspecified producer of Fresh Off the Boat, which had contributed to her initial reaction to the news of the show's renewal.

== Filmography ==
=== Film ===
Year	Title	Role	Notes
2006	Stephanie Daley	Jenn	
2006	The Architect	Michelle	
2007	Year of the Fish	Lucy	
2011	Sound of My Voice	Christine	
2012	Watching TV with the Red Chinese	Kimi Hu	
2013	Best Friends Forever	Melanie	
2014	Electric Slide	Mika Oh	
2015	Parallels	Polly	
2017	The Feels	Andi	
2017	The Lego Ninjago Movie	The Mayor of Ninjago (voice)	
2017	Nine Minutes	Lilian	short film
2018	Crazy Rich Asians	Rachel Chu	
2018	Next Gen	Molly Su (voice)	
2019	Hustlers	Destiny	
2021	Wish Dragon	Mrs. Song (voice)	
2021	I Was a Simple Man	Grace	
2022	Jennifer Lopez: Halftime	Herself	Documentary film
2022	Lyle, Lyle, Crocodile	Katie Primm	
2024	The Friend	Tuesday	
2026	Happy Hours	Liz's agent	
2026	The Outer Threat	Michelle	

=== Television ===
Year	Title	Role	Notes
2006	Law & Order: Special Victims Unit	Candy	Episode: "Underbelly"
2007	One Life to Live	Laudine Lee	3 episodes
2011	Torchwood	Shawnie Yamaguchi	Episode: "Miracle Day: End of the Road"
2013	Browsers	Prudence Yu	Television pilot
2013	Covert Affairs	Wendy Chen	Episode: "Rock a My Soul"
2014	Franklin & Bash	Caroline Chilton	Episode: "Falcon's Nest"
2014	High Moon	Mikiko Kobiyashi	Unsold television pilot
2015	Childrens Hospital	Pepsi Lamarr	Episode: "Up at 5""
2015–2020	Fresh Off the Boat	Jessica Huang	Main role
2016	Royal Pains	Amy Chang	Episode: "Fly Me to Kowloon"
2017	Dimension 404	Jane	Episode: "Bob"
2021	Solos	Jenny	Episode: "Jenny"
2022–present	The Terminal List	Katie Buranek	Main role, 16 episodes, 2 seasons
2022	Celebrity Jeopardy!	Herself	Contestant
2023–2024	Velma	Daphne Blake	Voice; Main role
2026	Elsbeth	Dr. Mallory Haynes	season 3 episode 17 "High Class Problems"
2026	Not Suitable for Work	Vanessa Hsu	6 episodes
2027	Crazy Rich Asians	Rachel Chu	Production to start by 2027

=== Theater ===
Year	Title	Role	Venue	Ref.
2004	And the Earth Moved	Jenny	45th Street Theatre	
2005	The Tempest	Miranda	Virginia Shakespeare Festival	
2006	Ping Pong Diplomacy	Zhu	59E59 Theaters	
2022	2:22 A Ghost Story	Jenny	Ahmanson Theatre	
2023	Little Shop of Horrors	Audrey	Westside Theatre	
2024	Shit. Meet. Fan.	Hannah	MCC Theater	

=== Music videos ===
- "Family Feud" (2017) by Jay-Z featuring Beyoncé

== Bibliography ==
- Making a Scene (2022) ISBN 978-1982188566

== Awards and nominations ==
Wu has earned several accolades, including nominations for a Golden Globe Award, a Screen Actors Guild Award, two Critics' Choice Movie Awards, four Critics' Choice Television Awards, and two TCA Awards.

Year	Award	Category	Nominated work	Result	Ref.
2014	Indie Series Awards	Best Supporting Actress - Drama	EastSiders	Nominated	
2014	Indie Series Awards	Best Ensemble - Drama	EastSiders	Won	
2014	Critics' Choice Television Awards	Best Actress in a Comedy Series	Fresh Off the Boat	Nominated	
2015	Critics' Choice Television Awards	Best Actress in a Comedy Series	Fresh Off the Boat	Nominated	
2015	Unforgettable Gala – Asian American Awards	Female Breakout Star of the Year	Fresh Off the Boat	Won	
2015	Poppy Awards	Best Supporting Actress in a Comedy Series	Fresh Off the Boat	Nominated	
2015	TCA Awards	Individual Achievement in Comedy	Fresh Off the Boat	Nominated	
2016	Poppy Awards	Best Actress in a Comedy Series	Fresh Off the Boat	Nominated	
2016	Critics' Choice Television Awards	Best Actress in a Comedy Series	Fresh Off the Boat	Nominated	
2016	TCA Awards	Individual Achievement in Comedy	Fresh Off the Boat	Nominated	
2016	Indie Series Awards	Best Supporting Actress - Drama	EastSiders	Nominated	
2016	Indie Series Awards	Best Ensemble - Drama	EastSiders	Won	
2018	Critics' Choice Television Awards	Best Actress in a Comedy Series	Fresh Off the Boat	Nominated	
2018	Detroit Film Critics Society	Best Ensemble	Crazy Rich Asians	Nominated	
2018	Hollywood Film Awards	Breakout Ensemble Award	Crazy Rich Asians	Won	
2019	The Asian Awards	Outstanding Achievement in Cinema	Crazy Rich Asians	Won	
2019	National Board of Review	Best Cast	Crazy Rich Asians	Won	
2019	Satellite Awards	Best Actress – Comedy or Musical	Crazy Rich Asians	Nominated	
2019	NAACP Image Awards	Outstanding Actress in a Motion Picture	Crazy Rich Asians	Nominated	
2019	NAACP Image Awards	Outstanding Ensemble Cast in a Motion Picture	Crazy Rich Asians	Nominated	
2019	Golden Globe Awards	Best Actress in a Motion Picture – Comedy or Musical	Crazy Rich Asians	Nominated	
2019	Critics' Choice Movie Awards	Best Actress in a Comedy	Crazy Rich Asians	Nominated	
2019	Critics' Choice Movie Awards	Best Acting Ensemble	Crazy Rich Asians	Nominated	
2019	Screen Actors Guild Awards	Outstanding Performance by a Cast in a Motion Picture	Crazy Rich Asians	Nominated	
2019	Dublin Film Critics' Circle	Best Actress	Crazy Rich Asians	Nominated	
2019	Teen Choice Awards	Choice Comedy Movie Actress	Crazy Rich Asians	Nominated	
2020	Satellite Awards	Best Actress in a Motion Picture, Comedy/Musical	Hustlers	Nominated	
