= Tim Chiou =

American actor

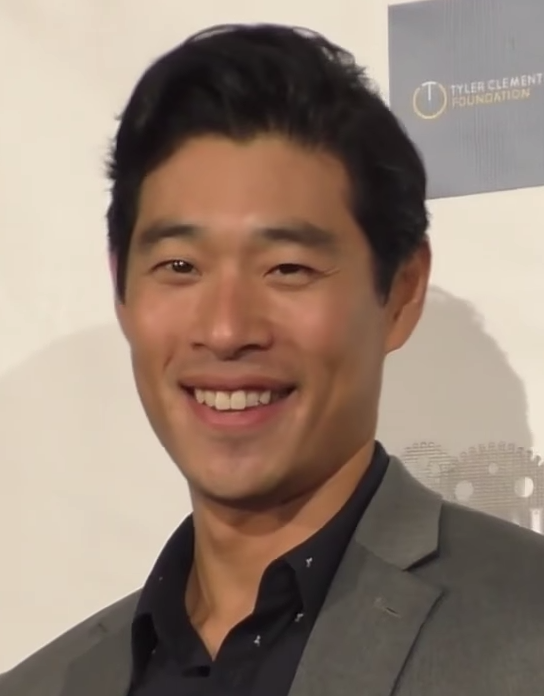
- Chiou at the premiere of Love Is All You Need? in 2016
- Born: November 23, 1979 (age 46); Iowa City, Iowa, U.S.
- Education: University of California, Los Angeles (BA)
- Occupations: Actor; model
- Years active: 2005–present
- Height: 6 ft 2 in (188 cm)
- Website: timchiou.com

Timothy Chiou (born November 23, 1979) is an American actor. He most notably played the reoccurring role of the venture capitalist Ed Chen on Season 4 of HBO's Silicon Valley.

== Education ==
Chiou attended the University of California, Los Angeles, where he majored in English and was involved in the Asian American theatre company on campus, LCC, which had been co-founded by Randall Park just several years prior. He would later join Park to form the comedy troupe "The Propaganders".

== Career ==
Chiou's most prominent role to date has been as the venture capitalist Ed Chen on Season 4 of HBO's Silicon Valley. The character, who works at the fictional Raviga Capital Management, serves as a parody of Silicon Valley "bro" culture.

On television, he also played A.J., the Gang leader on IZombie, and on TV shows such as House M.D., The Cape (as Kwan), Victorious, Parenthood (as Mike Garrison), CSI:NY, Grey's Anatomy, Southland, Dollhouse (as Travis Nikoden), NCIS (as Officer Kevin Lim), Hannah Montana, Chuck, Just Jordan, and 'Til Death.

Chiou has starred in feature films such as multi-character film Crossing Over also starring Harrison Ford, Ray Liotta, Ashley Judd, Justin Chon, Leonardo Nam and more, Seventh Moon opposite Amy Smart as her love interest, Quentin Lee's The People I've Slept With as Fred, the husband of Lynn Chen's character, Juliet, and as "The Wang" in Abraham Lim's The Achievers, written by Michael Golamco. He has also been in a number of independent short films such as James Huang's Represent and The Adventures of Johnny Karate and Golden Delicious, Viet Nguyen's Ninja Say What, and Nadine Truong's Initiation.

Chiou has also appeared in the Colony Theater production of Michael Golamco's play, Year Zero as Han as well as the production of the play at the Victory Gardens Theater in Chicago. Chiou has also appeared in Snow Falling on Cedars at Theaterworks in Silicon Valley as Kabuo Miyamoto, Beth Henley's Crimes of the Heart at East West Players, You Can't Take It with You at the Geffen Playhouse as well as the Berkeley Repertory Theater production of Heidi Stillman's The North China Lover, a stage adaptation of Marguerite Duras's novel, The Lover. He has also reprised his role as "The Lover" in Looking Glass Theater's 2013 Chicago production of Heidi Stillman's The North China Lover, the play getting rave reviews from the Chicago Sun-Times, Time Out Chicago, and The Chicago Theater Beat.

Chiou has also appeared in print modeling ads for companies such as GNC.

== Awards ==
Chiou won a "Best Actor" award at the 8th Annual NBC Short Cuts Film Festival in 2013 for his performance as "King" in Kevin Lau's short film, Made in Chinatown opposite Elaine Kao. The awards ceremony was hosted by Craig Robinson, and the film Made in Chinatown also won awards for Best Short (presented by Marlon Wayans), and Best Writing. For the 2013 NBC Short Cuts Film Festival, only eight films made the final cut of finalists considered for awards out of the 1400 total films submitted.

== Filmography ==
Film
Year	Work	Role	Notes
2006	The Achievers	The Wang	
2007	The Wizard of Gore	Chinese Mickey	
2007	L.A. Proper	Daniel Yang	
2008	Seventh Moon	Yul	
2009	Crossing Over	Steve	
2010	A Foundling	Jim Wales	
2012	The People I've Slept With	Fred	
2014	Tin Man	Teddy Meade	TV movie
2015	Crush the Skull	Riley	
2015	Unsingle	Michael	TV movie
2016	Love Is All You Need?	Brad Henderson	
2019	Plus One	Nate	
2021	I Was a Simple Man	Masao	

Television
Year	Work	Role	Notes
2006	Standoff	Paul	Episode: "Shanghai'd"
2006-2007	'Til Death	Delivery man	2 episodes
2007-2009	Grey's Anatomy	Paramedic	3 episodes
2007	October Road	Young dude	Episode: "Let's Get Owen"
2008	Just Jordan	Monte	Episode: "Picture Me Rollin'"
2008	Chuck	Mighty Jock	Episode: "Chuck Versus the Break-Up"
2008	Hannah Montana	Stage manager	Episode: "He Ain't a Hottie, He's My Brother"
2009	NCIS	Petty Officer Kevin Lim	Episode: "Broken Bird"
2009	Dollhouse	Travis Nikoden	Episode: "A Spy in the House of Love"
2009	Southland	Responding officer	Episode: "See the Woman"
2010	CSI: NY	Vince	Episode: "Unusual Suspects"
2011	Victorious	Record producer	Episode: "The Diddly-Bops"
2011	The Cape	Kwan	Episode: "Scales"
2011	House	Dad #1	Episode: "Parents"
2012	2 Broke Girls	Edwin	Episode: "And the One-Night Stands"
2013-2016	Living with Models	Kim	Recurring role, 22 episodes
2013	Baby Daddy	Good Samaritan	Episode: "Surprise!"
2014	Don't Talk in the Kitchen	Kenny	Episode: "Single Ladies Life Alert"
2014	Chicago P.D.	Rick Fong	Episode: "Different Mistakes"
2015, 2017-19	iZombie	AJ	Episode: "Liv and Let Clive"; "Return of the Dead Guy"; "Yipee Ki Brain, Motherscratcher!"; "Insane in the Germ Brain; and "The Fresh Princess"
2015	Major Crimes	Ken Song	Episode: "Blackout"
2016	Stitchers	Morgan	Episode: "Pretty Little Lawyers"
2016	Code Black	Lt. Jeff Reese	Episode: "Sleight of Hand"
2017	Silicon Valley	Ed Chen	4 episodes in Season 4
2020	SEAL Team	Michael ‘Thirty Mike’ Chen	Season 3 and Season 4
2022	Space Force	Dr. Lim	Season 2
2023	The Company You Keep	David	Main role

Web series
Year	Work	Role
2017	John Hughes Ruined My Life	Tim
