= I Was a Simple Man =

2021 drama film

- Theatrical release poster
- Directed by: Christopher Makoto Yogi
- Written by: Christopher Makoto Yogi
- Produced by: Sarah Kim
- Starring: Steve Iwamoto; Constance Wu; Tim Chiou; Kanoa Goo
- Cinematography: Eunsoo Cho
- Edited by: Christopher Makoto Yogi
- Music by: Pierre Guerineau; Alex Zhang Hungtai
- Production companies: Talk Tree; Flies Collective
- Distributed by: Strand Releasing
- Release dates: January 29, 2021 (Sundance); November 19, 2021 (United States)
- Running time: 100 minutes
- Country: United States
- Languages: English; Hawaiian; Chinese; Japanese
- Box office: $12,669

I Was a Simple Man is an American family drama film written and directed by Christopher Makoto Yogi. The film stars Steve Iwamoto, Constance Wu, Tim Chiou and Kanoa Goo.

The film has its world premiere at the 2021 Sundance Film Festival on January 29, 2021, and received a limited theatrical release in the United States on November 19, 2021, by Strand Releasing.

== Premise ==
As a family in Hawai'i faces the imminent death of their eldest, the ghosts of the past haunt the countryside.

== Cast ==
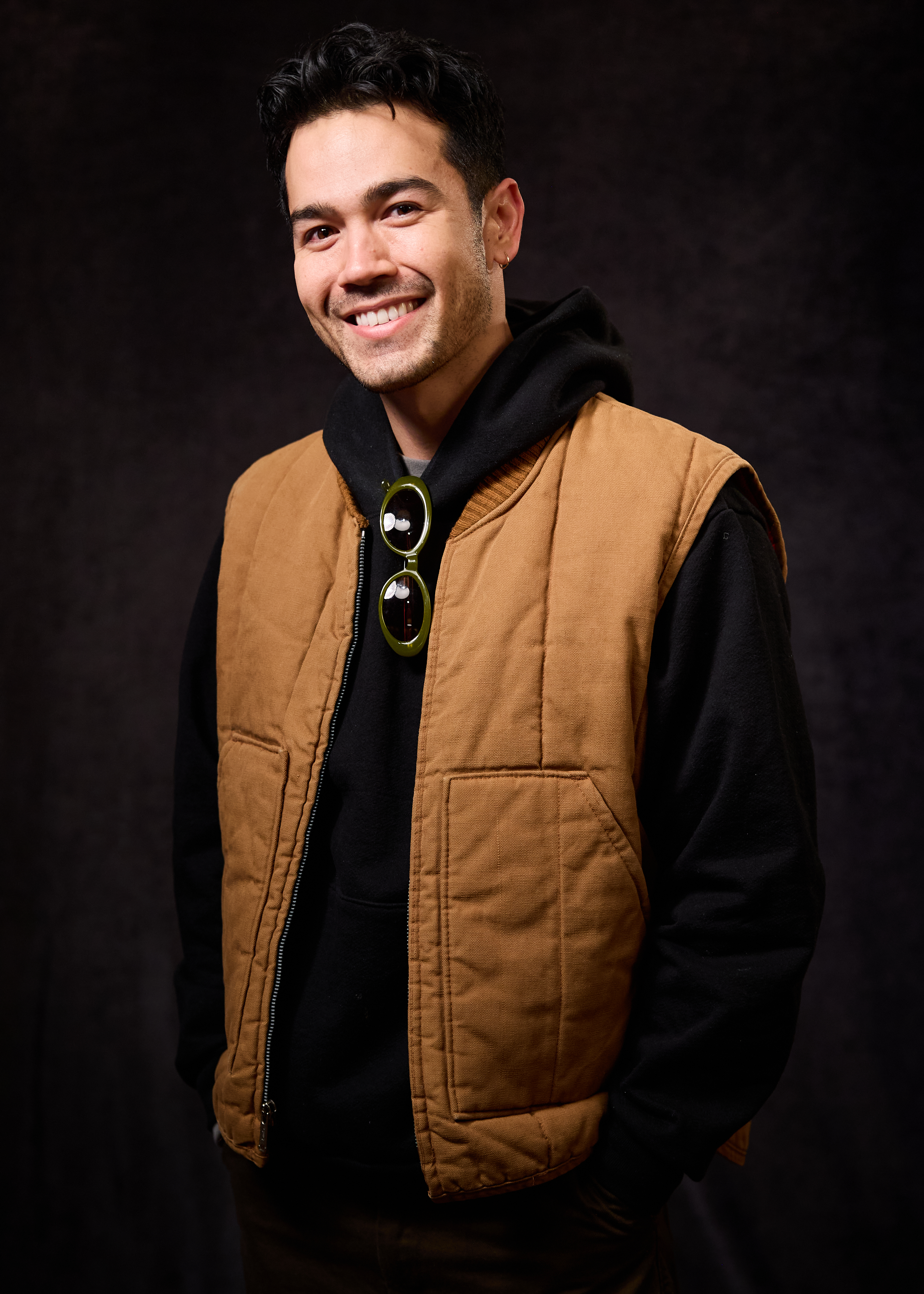
Kanoa Goo at the 2024 Sundance Film Festival

The cast includes:

- Steve Iwamoto as Masao Matsuyoshi
- Constance Wu as Grace
- Tim Chiou as Adult Masao
- Kanoa Goo as Gavin
- Chanel Akiko Hirai as Kati
- Nelson Lee as Mark
- Hau'oli Carr as Ashley
- Kyle Kosaki as Young Masao
- Boonyanudh Jiyarom as Young Grace

== Reception ==
The film won the Grand Jury Award at the San Diego Asian Film Festival. It also won the Grand Jury Prize at the Los Angeles Asian Pacific Film Festival and the Made in Hawai‘i Award at the Hawai‘i International Film Festival.

On the review aggregator website Rotten Tomatoes, 88% of 24 critics' reviews are positive, with an average rating of 7.00/10. The website's consensus reads: "I Was a Simple Man tells a simple story whose deceptively straightforward approach yields richly melancholic rewards." Metacritic, which uses a weighted average, assigned the film a score of 83 out of 100, based on 9 critics, indicating "universal acclaim". It was named the fourth best film of 2021 in the New Yorker Magazine, where film critic Richard Brody called it "one of the great films about death." Roxana Hadadi wrote on RogerEbert.com that the film is a "100-minute spell of beauty and melancholy, intimate and grand in equal measure", while David Ehrlich of IndieWire called it "masterful" and dubbed it a "Critics Pick".
