= Ela Orleans =

Polish musician (born 1971)

- Also known as: Tract; Lizzy Swimmers
- Born: 1971 (age 54–55); Oświęcim, Poland
- Genres: Electronic; experimental; folk; indie; indie electronic; opera; post-punk; soundtrack; witch house; 21st-century classical
- Occupations: Composer; multi-instrumentalist; singer; DJ
- Instruments: Vocals; synthesiser; piano; violin; guitar
- Website: elaorleans.com

Ela Orleans (born 1971 in Oświęcim, commonly known by its German name of Auschwitz) is a Polish composer, multi-instrumentalist and singer.

== Personal life and musical career ==
Orleans lives and works between Paris, Glasgow, and Warsaw. Various independent labels around the world since 2008 have released her solo studio albums, as well as compilations, mixes and collaborations with artists such as Dirty Beaches, U.S. Girls and The Pastels. Orleans has scored music for TV, film, and opera.

== Discography ==
=== Hassle Hound ===
- Scaring the Grass in the Garden (2002, Pickled Egg)
- Sun & Hassle Hound (2003, Textile; split with Sun)
- "Appalachian Listening Post" (2004, Twisted Nerve; single)
- Limelight Cordial (2006, Staubgold)
- Born in a Night (2010, Staubgold)

=== Ela Orleans solo ===
- Low Sun, High Moon (2008, Setola di Maiale)
- Ahata/Anahata (2009, La Station Radar; collaboration with Skitter)
- Lost (2009, La Station Radar)
- The Strongest Walls Open as I Pass (2010, La Station Radar; collaboration with Skitter)
- Double Feature (2011, Night People, La Station Radar; split with Dirty Beaches)
- Mars Is Heaven (2011, La Station Radar, Atelier Ciseaux)
- NEO PI-R (2011, Clan Destine; compilation)
- Statement (2012, Clan Destine; split with Slim Twig, Dirty Beaches, U.S. Girls)
- 80 Minutes of Funk (2012, Clan Destine; (split with Curt Crackrach)
- De fléchettes (2013, Clan Destine; collaboration with Skitter)
- Tumult in Clouds (2013, Clan Destine; double album)
- Upper Hell (2015, HB)
- Circles of Upper and Lower Hell (2016, Night School; double album)
- Movies for Ears (2019, Night School; compilation)
