= Leonard Wu =

American actor (born 1980)

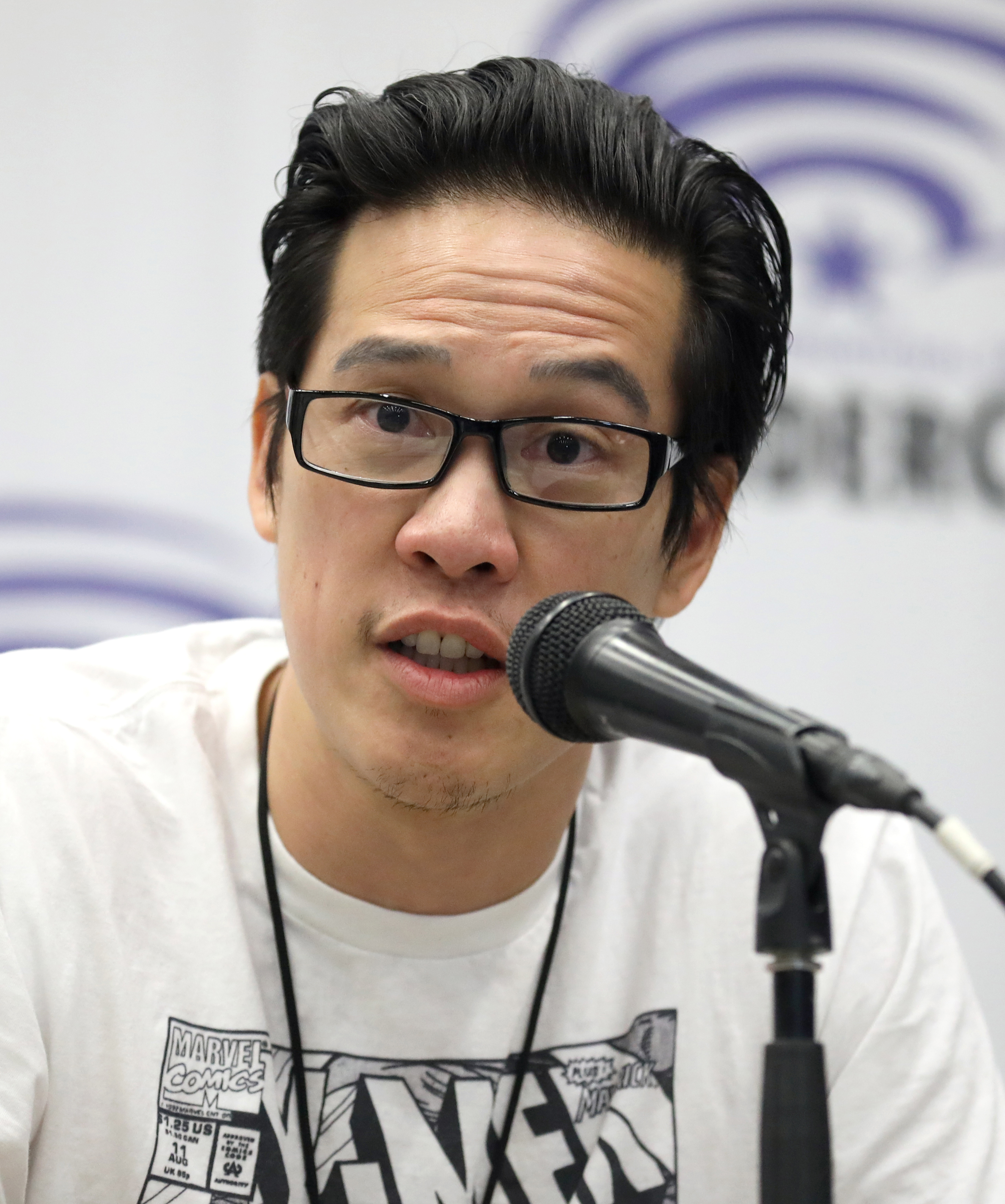
- Wu at the 2024 WonderCon
- Born: Washington, D.C., U.S.
- Education: University of California, Los Angeles (BA)
- Occupation: Actor
- Years active: 2003–present
- Children: 1

Leonard Wu is an American actor. He is known for his roles as Orus in the Netflix television drama series Marco Polo (2016), Shiwei Chen in the drama television series Bosch (2018), Kinuba in the action film Alita: Battle Angel (2019) and Ryuzo in the video game Ghost of Tsushima (2020).

== Early life ==
Wu was born in Washington, D.C. to Chinese parents. Wu graduated from the UCLA with a BA degree in English.

== Career ==
From 2004 to 2013, he has appeared in a series of short films which lasted for nine years.

He has appeared in various television shows, including NCIS and Bones and several feature films including While She Was Out opposite Kim Basinger, and 17 Again.

In 2016, he portrayed Orus in the second and final season of the Netflix drama television series Marco Polo. In his interview on Cliche Magazine, he stated that "Orus is a fierce and loyal warrior intent on bringing long-held traditions back to the people of Mongolia." In 2019, he portrayed Kinuba in the science-fiction action film Alita: Battle Angel.

In 2020, he then went on to provide the voice and motion-capture of Ryuzo, a leader of the Straw Hat ronin who is a childhood friend of the main character, Daisuke Tsuji's character, in the PlayStation 4 video game Ghost of Tsushima.

Wu has recently appeared on the gritty feature film based on the New York gang warfare of the 1990s, Revenge of the Green Dragons, from director Andrew Lau.

In 2024, Wu has appeared once again with his Ghost of Tsushima castmates Daisuke Tsuji, Eddie Shin and Earl T. Kim in the video game Rise of the Rōnin.

== Filmography ==
=== Film ===
Year	Title	Role	Notes
2008	While She Was Out	Vingh	
2009	Why Am I Doing This?	Brian	
2009	17 Again	Kid in Office	
2014	Revenge of the Green Dragons	Ah Chung / Dai Lo	
2015	Crush the Skull	Koji Miller	
2019	Alita: Battle Angel	Kinuba	
2022	The World's Greatest	Ken	

=== Television ===
Year	Title	Role	Notes
2005	Veronica Mars	Hamilton Cho	Episode: "Kanes and Abel's"
2007	Bones	Nelson Han	Episode: "The Boneless Bride in the River"
2016	Marco Polo	Orus	8 episodes
2018	Bosch	Shiwei Chen	7 episodes
2018	Arcadia 51/50	Jason	Episode: "Getting Schooled"
2019	Soundtrack	Stephen	Episode: "Track 3: Sam and Dante"
2020	Bulge Bracket	Paul	Episode: "Volatility Index"
2021	The Casagrandes	Hui (voice)	Episode: "Bunstoppable"
2021	The Blacklist	Kuo Pai-Han	Episodes "The Skinner (No. 45)" and "The Skinner (No. 45): Conclusion"
2021	Magnum P.I.	Pin Kim	Episode: "Better Watch Out"
2023–2024	The Ghost and Molly McGee	Ruben Chen (voice)	Recurring
2023	American Born Chinese	Niu Mowang	Recurring
2024	Grey's Anatomy	Eddie Huang	Episode: "Take Me to Church"
2025	Low Life	Sim Hong-gi (voice)	Disney+ English version
2026	Chicago P.D.	Shen Zhuang	Episode: "The Thin Grey Line"

=== Video games ===
Year	Title	Role	Notes
2020	Ghost of Tsushima	Ryuzo	Voice and motion-capture
2024	Rise of the Rōnin	Shinpachi Nagakura	Voice; English version
2025	Ghost of Yōtei	Thousand Blades Toramasa	Voice; English version
