= Badlands (Dirty Beaches album) =

Studio album by Dirty Beaches
- Released: March 28, 2011
- Genres: Post punk, ambient, lo-fi
- Length: 27:01
- Label: Zoo Music
- Producer: Alex Zhang Hungtai

Dirty Beaches chronology
Night City (2010)	Badlands (2011)	Double Feature (2011)

Professional ratings
Review scores
Source	Rating
Allmusic	4/5 stars
The A.V. Club	A-
Pitchfork	(8.2/10)
PopMatters	8/10 stars
Tiny Mix Tapes	3.5/5 stars
Now	3/5 stars

Badlands is an album by Canadian musician Dirty Beaches. It was released on March 28, 2011 by Zoo Music.

It was longlisted as a nominee for the 2011 Polaris Music Prize.

== Track listing ==
#	Title	Samples	Time
1	"Speedway King"		3:31
2	"Horses"	"Mustang" performed by Link Wray	4:09
3	"Sweet 17"		3:26
4	"A Hundred Highways"	"Night Of The Assassins" performed by Les Rallizes Denudes	4:43
5	"True Blue"	"Keep on Dancing" performed by The Ronettes	2:53
6	"Lord Knows Best"	"Voilà" performed by Françoise Hardy	3:25
7	"Black Nylon"		2:52
8	"Hotel"		2:02
