= Dirty Beaches =

Canadian musician and actor

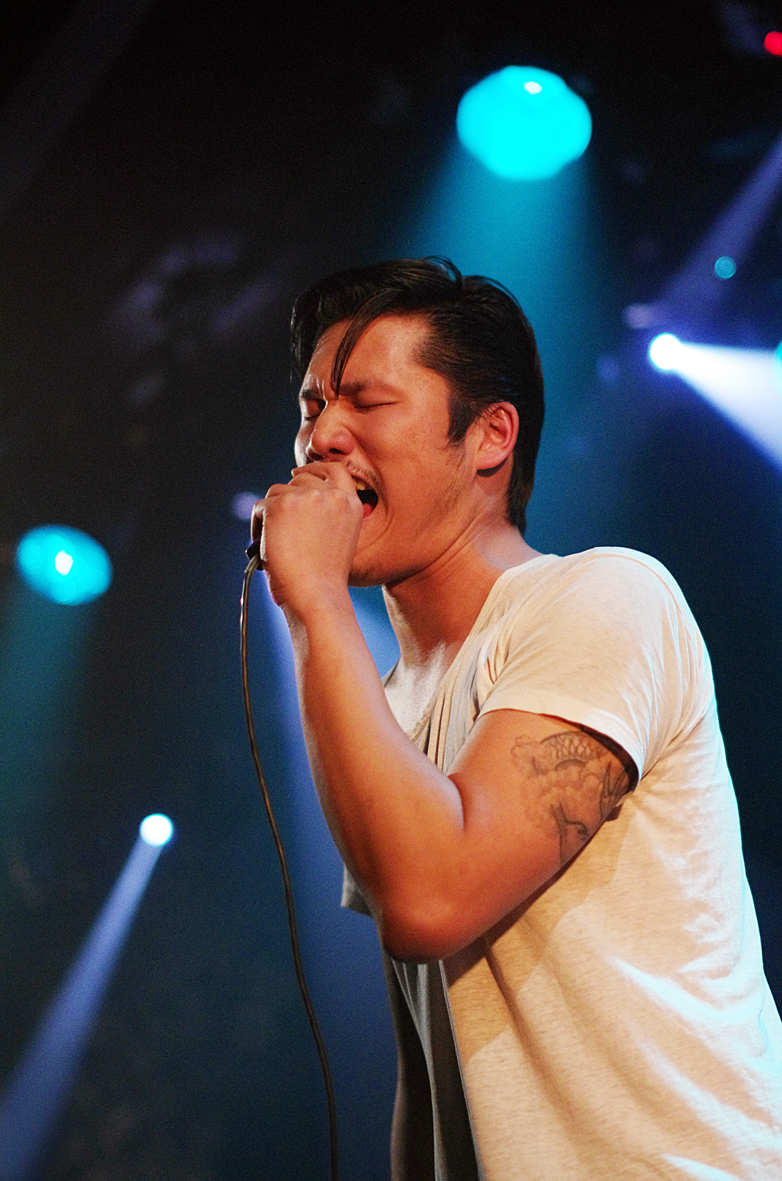
- Hungtai performing in 2012
- Born: Alex Zhang Hungtai; September 4, 1980 (age 46); Taipei, Taiwan
- Other names: Dirty Beaches; Last Lizard
- Citizenship: Canada
- Occupations: musician; composer; actor
- Musical career
- Genres: Post-punk; No wave; noise; ambient
- Instruments: Vocals; Saxophone; Guitar; Keyboard; Synth; Sampler
- Years active: 2005–present
- Label: Zoo Music
- Website: alexzhanghungtai.bandcamp.com

Chinese name
- Simplified Chinese: 张洪泰
- Traditional Chinese: 張洪泰
Transcriptions
Standard Mandarin
- Hanyu Pinyin: Zhāng Hóngtài
- Wade–Giles: Chang Hung-t'ai

Alex Zhang Hungtai (traditional Chinese: 張洪泰; simplified Chinese: 张洪泰; pinyin: Zhāng Hóngtài; Wade–Giles: Chang Hung-t'ai; born 4 September 1980) is a Taiwanese-born Canadian musician, composer, and actor. He has released music under the stage names Dirty Beaches and Last Lizard.

Zhang released several EPs and three albums as Dirty Beaches on cassette-only labels before releasing his fourth full-length album, Badlands, in March 2011. Unlike his earlier work, Badlands includes his vocals on most songs. The album was long-listed for the 2011 Polaris Music Prize. Drifters/Love Is The Devil followed in 2013, pushing further into no wave, electronic, jazz and ambient territory.

In 2014, Zhang ended the Dirty Beaches project after releasing the instrumental album Stateless, on which he played the saxophone. As Last Lizard, he collaborated with jazz and improvisational musicians and released new solo pieces on SoundCloud, Vimeo and Vine. In 2016 he released the instrumental piano album Knave of Hearts under his own name.

Zhang has also recorded original film soundtracks for several films and documentaries, including Water Park (2012), Who Is Arthur Chu? (2017) and Godland (2022), in addition to directing music videos for himself and others.

== Early life ==
Alex Zhang Hungtai was born September 4, 1980 in Taipei to Chinese parents from Shanghai. His parents immigrated to Canada with Zhang, where they settled in the Etobicoke neighborhood of Toronto. His parents returned to Taiwan when Zhang was 14, forcing him to move to New York City to live with his cousin in Queens. Zhang's mother disapproved the idea of him living in Queens, as his cousin was a drug dealer. Zhang subsequently moved to Hawaii to live with his sister in Honolulu, where he went to college to study psychology. He joined a Sepultura influenced band, however was kicked out due to "not being masculine enough".

In 2003, Zhang dropped out of college to join a indie rock band that was the opening act for The Strokes' Honolulu show. Zhang moved to San Francisco to join another band, but the suspension of his F Visa, forced him to return to Canada. Zhang was briefly barred from entering the United States due to overstaying his visa, forcing him into homelessness in Vancouver. Zhang briefly moved to Shanghai to live with his parents, where he worked in real estate, but returned to Canada to pursue music in Montreal.

== Career ==
=== Dirty Beaches (2005–2014) ===
Dirty Beaches began as a one-man band, sometimes employing sampling, inspired by Zhang's longtime love of hip-hop. In addition to his own years moving between countries and on the road touring, films are one of Zhang's influences, particularly those by both Hong Kong filmmaker Wong Kar-wai and Taiwanese director Hou Hsiao-Hsien. Zhang commented on Wong's films in an interview with Nothing Bad Magazine, saying:

"[They're] usually about the passage of time, and how in relation it distorts your relationship with everything else in life. The central Dirty Beaches character is a product of those experiences. Of someone traveling long distances in search of something, in exile, misplaced, with no home to return to".

As Dirty Beaches, Zhang released work on record labels worldwide after his first album, Old Blood, released on Montreal-based Fixture Records in 2008. He recorded and toured with musicians such as Dum Dum Girls, U.S. Girls, Tonya Harding, Ela Orleans, and Xiu Xiu.

In 2011, Zhang left a kitchen job to play music full-time. First touring solo, he then put together a live band with saxophone player Francesco De Gallo and drummer Jesse Locke. On tour, the band moved away from the sample-based rock of Badlands to embrace a more improvised sound. In 2012, guitarist Shub Roy and electronic musician Bernardino Femminielli joined the band live and in the studio.

After Badlands released in 2011, followed by several EPs and collaborations, the band recorded 75 minutes of new material in late 2012 and early 2013. One set of songs, Drifters, began at La Brique recording space in Montreal and features Zhang's vocals and songwriting, along with instrumental contributions by Roy, Femminielli, De Gallo, and Locke. Using live instruments such as the guitar, bass, keyboard, drum machines and saxophones arranged into original loops. None of the eight songs sampled previously existent recordings, a change from previous methods. While he was recording Drifters, Zhang moved to Berlin. On the invitation his friend Anton Newcombe of The Brian Jonestown Massacre, he finished the record in Newcombe's studio and also recorded Love is the Devil, an instrumental set of eight songs, in late hours when the studio was not in use.

Drifters/Love Is The Devil eventually released as a double LP, as well as on a single CD and in digital formats, on the Zoo Music label in May 2013. In November of the same year, Dirty Beaches played the All Tomorrow's Parties festival in Camber Sands, United Kingdom.

In August 2014, Zhang announced a new album, Stateless, which later released in November 2014. In December 2014, filmmaker Loic Zimmermann released an extended music video for the track Time Washes Everything Away, focusing on Zhang recording in Lisbon.

In a series of tweets in October 2014, Zhang announced the retirement of Dirty Beaches.

=== Music as Last Lizard and under full name (2015–present) ===
In early 2015, Zhang began releasing music under the project name Last Lizard. He also started releasing music under his full name.

In July 2018, Zhang released the album Divine Weight. The recording process originated from Zhang's dissatisfaction with his saxophone recordings prompting him to feed them through a laptop, "manipulating the sounds into entirely new forms, like rusted copper piping stripped out of an abandoned building and melted down into shiny, interwoven wiring". The recordings were influenced by Chilean-French mystic and filmmaker Alejandro Jodorowsky, and the cover shows a distorted image of the Japanese Butoh dancer Kazuo Ohno. In a 2018 review of Divine Weight, Pitchfork commented:

"Since retiring the Dirty Beaches moniker in 2014, having completed the transition from songs to soundscaping, Zhang has fully indulged his newfound aesthetic freedom. Whether he's releasing meditative piano instrumentals, forming violent free jazz trios, or constructing dark, dissonant sound collages with Love Theme, Zhang is never afraid to expose his work's jagged edges. He's long favoured a raw field recording ambience that amplifies the overarching sense of improvised experiments being caught on tape in real time".

In 2020, Zhang collaborated on two full length instrumental albums, LONGONE with Tseng Kuo-Hung and STYX with Pavel Milyakov.

In 2021, Zhang collaborated with Pierre Guerineau for the soundtrack to the Christopher Makoto Yogi film I Was a Simple Man. The following year in 2022, he composed the soundtrack for Godland, directed by Hlynur Pálmason.

Zhang's music explores the meaning of existence, often expressing subtle feelings about being in different countries, by integrating his own cultural and traditional heritage into his work. In a 2023 interview with BmoreArt, Zhang commented:

"I belong nowhere, neither a native Taiwanese nor a true American, I will be an outsider all my life. So I don't have that kind of loyalty to a place... I used to feel sad because of the feeling of being an outsider. At that time, I didn't know why I was sad, and I didn't know what "diaspora" meant. It was an abstract, indescribable, and unspeakable feeling".

In January 2024, Zhang released a full length album, Young Gods Run Free.

In April 2026, Zhang released a full length album, Dras. In June of the same year, he released a double album, Orion/Mother, of which two tracks featured in a short film, At the River Styx, directed by Brian Echon and filmed at the Los Angeles River.

== Acting career ==
In 2016, Zhang appeared as the central character in the short film Correspondence, directed by Loic Zimmermann, featuring Zhang's saxophone-based original score and some lo-fi piano soundscapes and voiceovers read by Mike Watt. The film is a tribute to Chantal Akerman's News from Home.

In 2017, Zhang appeared in the fifth, David Lynch-directed episode of the revived third season of Twin Peaks. Playing with Dean Hurley and Riley Lynch as part of the group Trouble. The song, Snake Eyes, was issued as a single by Sacred Bones Records.

In 2018, he appeared alongside Jessica Henwick and Kiko Mizuhara in the short film Yo! My Saint, directed by Ana Lily Amirpour, featuring music from Karen O and Michael Kiwanuka, promoting the fashion label Kenzo's spring line. Zhang also starred as Konrad in the Canadian independent film "A", directed by Mitchell Stafiej. The film was released in 2018 featured other notable musicians such as Bernardino Femminielli, Maica Armata, and Petra Glynt. He also contributed original music to the film, recorded entirely on set, in character, during production.

In 2018, the film August at Akiko's had its premiere at film festivals. Directed by Christopher Makoto Yogi and set in Zhang's childhood home in Honolulu. The film features Zhang in a leading role, alongside Zhang's sax based original score, which was released as a soundtrack album.

== Discography ==
=== Studio albums ===
==== As Dirty Beaches ====
- Old Blood (2007, Fixture Records)
- Horror (2008, Fixture Records)
- Night City (2010, Night People)
- Badlands (2011, Zoo Music)
- Drifters/Love Is the Devil (2013, Zoo Music)
- Stateless (2014, Zoo Music)

==== As Alex Zhang ====
- Knave Of Hearts (2016, Ascetic House)
- Divine Weight (2018, NON Worldwide)
- Young Gods Run Free (2020)
- Swimming Bird (2022)
- Dras (2026, Shelter Press)
- Orion/Mother (2026, American Dreams)
- Wild Gander (2026, Industrial Coast)

==== Collaborative albums ====
- Split (2009, Campaign for Infinity) split album with Omon Ra II, as Dirty Beaches
- Mae Mae (2011, free download) collaborative album with Apollo Ghosts, as Masterchef
- Decadent (2010, Campaign for Infinity) split album with Generic Shit, Hobo Cubes & Street Gnar, as Dirty Beaches
- Double Feature (2011, Night People/ La Station Radar/ Atelier Ciseaux) split album with Ela Orleans, as Dirty Beaches
- Statement (2012, Clan Destine Records) split album with Ela Orleans, Slim Twig & U.S. Girls, as Dirty Beaches
- Love Theme (2017, Alter) collaborative project with Austin Milne and Simon Frank
- Longone (2020) collaborative album with Tseng Kuo-Hung
- STYX (2020, PSY X) collaborative album with Pavel Milyakov
- KETU (2022, Futuro Familiar) collaborative album with Pedro Alves Sousa, David Maranha and Gabriel Ferrandini
- RAHU (2022, Futuro Familiar) collaborative album with Pedro Alves Sousa, David Maranha, Gabriel Ferrandini & Júlia Reis

=== Live albums ===
- The Spirit of Crazy Horse (Live at Landmark: Bergen, Norway) (2012, digital release) as Dirty Beaches
- Âncora (2016, Grain Of Sound) collaboration with David Maranha and Gabriel Ferrandini trio, as Alex Zhang

=== Singles and EPs ===
==== As Dirty Beaches ====
- Chess Music EP (2007)
- Seaside EP (2008, Fixture Records)
- Bird EP (2009, Fixture Records)
- Dirty Beaches cassette (2009, Night People)
- Golden Desert Sun single (2010, Italian Beach Babes)
- B Side cassette (2010, La Station Radar)
- True Blue single (2010, Zoo Music)
- Solid State Gold cassette (2010, Rose Mansion Analog)
- No Fun single (2011, Italian Beach Babes)
- Lone Runner single (2011, Suicide Squeeze Records)
- Tarlabaşı single (2012, BRONSON Produzioni)
- Dune Walker single (2012, Slowboy Records)
- Elizabeth's Theme single (2012, Kingfisher Bluez)
- Hotel EP (2014, BIG LOVE Records)
- Neon Gods of Lost Youth EP (2014)

==== Collaborative singles and EPs ====
- U.S. Girls/Dirty Beaches (2010, Sibling Sex) split EP
- The Singer (2011, Soft Power Records) split single with Conor Prendergast
- Xiu Xiu/Dirty Beaches (2012, Bella Union) split single for Record Store Day
- Dirty Beaches/Tonstartssbandht (2013, Spacebridge Records) split cassette EP
- Snake Eyes (2017, Sacred Bones Records) single by Trouble, a group comprising Dean Hurley, Riley Lynch and Zhang

=== Compilations ===
- Expressway (2012, Bathetic Records) compilation co-curated by Alex Zhang

=== Soundtracks ===
- Practical ESP (2011) directed by Zoe Kirk-Gushowaty
- The Hippo (2012) directed by J. Asher Lynch
- Waterpark (2013) directed by Evan Prosofsky
- Who Is Arthur Chu? (2017) directed by Yu Gu and Scott Drucker
- August at Akiko's (2018) directed by Christopher Makoto Yogi
- I Was a Simple Man (2021) directed by Christopher Makoto Yogi (soundtrack by Zhang and Pierre Guerineau)
- Godland (2022) directed by Hlynur Pálmason (soundtrack by Zhang)

=== Music videos ===
==== As Dirty Beaches ====
- "West Coast Bird" (2009) directed by Alex Zhang
- "Shangri-La" (2010) directed by Alex Zhang
- "True Blue" (2010) directed by Alex Calder
- "Lord Knows Best" (2011) directed by Zoe Kirk-Gushowaty
- "Speedway King" (2011) directed by Alex Zhang
- "Lone Runner" (2011) directed by Kevin Luna
- "White Sand" (2011) directed by Tsien-Tsien Zhang, cinematography by Christopher Doyle
- "Neon Gods & Funeral Strippers" (2012) directed by Alex Zhang
- "Casino Lisboa" (2013) directed by Gary Boyle
- "I Dream in Neon" (2013) directed by Michael Lawrence
- "Stateless" (2014) directed by Alex Zhang
- "Time Washes Everything Away" (2014) directed by Loic Zimmermann

==== As Last Lizard ====
- "Alex Zhang: Last Lizard" (2015) directed by Emily Kai Bock

==== Videos directed for other artists ====
- "Between" by Night Musik (2015)
