= Drifters/Love Is the Devil =

Drifters/Love Is The Devil

Studio album by Dirty Beaches
- Released: 21 May 2013
- Recorded: Montreal and Berlin, 2012-2013
- Genres: Indie rock; art rock; experimental pop; noise pop; no wave; lo-fi
- Length: 75:34
- Label: Zoo Music
- Producer: Alex Zhang Hungtai

Dirty Beaches chronology
Water Park OST (2012)	''Drifters/Love Is The Devil'' (2013)	Stateless (2014)

Professional ratings
Review scores
Source	Rating
AllMusic	3.5/5 stars
Consequence of Sound	3.5/5 stars
Exclaim!	8/10
Filter	81%
NME	6/10
Now	4/5 stars
Paste	76%
Pitchfork	8.4/10
Tiny Mix Tapes	4/5 stars

Drifters/Love Is the Devil is a double album by Dirty Beaches, released on 21 May 2013.

The first eight songs comprise the Drifters set, recorded in Montreal, Canada and Berlin, Germany and featuring songwriter, instrumentalist and singer Alex Zhang Hungtai, guitarist Shub Roy, electronic musician Bernardino Femminielli, with additional contributions by saxophonist Francesco De Gallo and drummer Jesse Locke. The final eight songs comprise the Love Is The Devil set, recorded by Zhang in Berlin and featuring his instrumental guitar and keyboard work. Zhang had recorded in Berlin on the invitation of Anton Newcombe of The Brian Jonestown Massacre where he used his studio in the late hours when not in use.

The photo for the album cover was shot in Roses, a gay bar on Oranienstrasse in the Kreuzberg district of Berlin.

== Track listing ==
Drifters: Side One
No.	Title	Length
1.	"Night Walk"	3:55
2.	"I Dream In Neon"	3:36
3.	"Belgrade"	3:39
4.	"Casino Lisboa"	3:46
5.	"ELLI"	3:15
Total length:		17:11

Drifters: Side Two
No.	Title	Length
1.	"Au Revoir Mon Visage"	4:01
2.	"Mirage Hall"	9:47
3.	"Landscapes In The Mist"	5:13
Total length:		19:01

Love is the Devil: Side One
No.	Title	Length
1.	"Greyhound At Night"	3:24
2.	"This Is Not My City"	3:42
3.	"Woman"	3:53
4.	"Love Is The Devil"	4:11
Total length:		15:10

Love is the Devil: Side Two
No.	Title	Length
1.	"Alone At The Danube River"	7:33
2.	"I Don't Know How To Find My Way Back To You"	3:28
3.	"Like The Ocean We Part"	4:32
4.	"Berlin"	7:39
Total length:		23:11
