= Godland (film) =

2022 film by Hlynur Pálmason

- Icelandic theatrical release poster
- Icelandic: Volaða land
- Danish: Vanskabte Land
- Directed by: Hlynur Pálmason
- Written by: Hlynur Pálmason
- Produced by: Eva Jakobsen; Mikkel Jersin; Katrin Pors; Anton Máni Svansson
- Starring: Elliott Crosset Hove; Ingvar Eggert Sigurðsson
- Cinematography: Maria von Hausswolff
- Edited by: Julius Krebs Damsbo
- Music by: Alex Zhang Hungtai
- Production companies: Snowglobe Films; Garagefilm International
- Distributed by: Sena (Iceland); Scanbox Entertainment (Denmark); Folkets Bio (Sweden); Jour2Fête (France)
- Release date: 24 May 2022 (Cannes)
- Running time: 142 minutes
- Countries: Iceland; Denmark; France; Sweden
- Languages: Icelandic; Danish
- Budget: €5,000,000
- Box office: $1.6 million

Godland (Icelandic: Volaða land, Danish: Vanskabte Land, lit. 'Malformed Land') is a 2022 drama film written and directed by Hlynur Pálmason. Set in the late 19th century, the film stars Elliott Crosset Hove as Lucas, a Lutheran priest from Denmark who is sent to Iceland to oversee the establishment of a new parish church, only to have his faith tested and challenged by the harsh conditions of rural life, including his inability as a monolingual Danish-language speaker to communicate with his assigned Icelandic guide, Ragnar (Ingvar Eggert Sigurðsson).

The film premiered at the 2022 Cannes Film Festival on 24 May 2022, and was nominated for many and won several awards in 2022, including the Gold Hugo for Best Feature Film at the Chicago Film Festival. It was selected as the Icelandic entry for the Best International Feature Film at the 96th Academy Awards, and was one of the 15 finalist films in the December shortlist.

== Plot ==
In the late 19th century, Danish priest Lucas is tasked with traveling to Iceland (at the time a Danish territory) and building a church in a Danish settlement. He takes a camera to document the land and travels by boat with several Icelandic labourers and an interpreter, who is Lucas's only ally and connection to the rest of the group. When they arrive, they meet their guide, Ragnar, who harbors a distrust of Danes.

While traveling the group encounters a deep and raging river which, despite Ragnar's warnings, Lucas insists they ford. Both the interpreter and a large cross fall off his horses and the interpreter drowns. They bury him by covering him with earth, which is soon dispersed by the rising tide. Grief-stricken, Lucas becomes withdrawn and sullen, praying for God to allow him to return to Denmark. He faints from exhaustion and falls off his horse, and the group has to carry him the rest of the way on a makeshift stretcher. Later, the group is shown to have arrived at the settlement, where Lucas is nursed back to health by a man named Carl and his daughters, Anna and Ida.

The villagers come together to build the church and celebrate occasions within it. When a couple marry, Lucas refuses to perform the ceremony as the church is yet unfinished. During the wedding reception, the men engage in traditional wrestling games and Carl chooses to go against Lucas, who wins and then faces Ragnar, where there is a palpable tension, but the outcome is not shown.

As Lucas befriends Ida and develops an attraction to Anna, his horse goes missing and is later shown to be dead. When the church is completed, Ragnar finds Lucas outside the village and requests that a photo of him be taken before he leaves, but Lucas refuses and insults him. Ragnar makes a confession in Danish, including confirming that he had killed Lucas's horse. Lucas snaps and attacks him, and as they fight, he bashes Ragnar's head against the rocks and kills him. Lucas returns to Anna and discards his camera equipment, and she seduces him and they have sex. Next morning, Carl warns Anna not to get involved with Lucas.

During Lucas's first service in the finished church, Ragnar's dog interrupts by continuously barking outside. When Lucas goes out to quiet it, he slips in mud and dirties his robes and face. Lucas steals one of Ida's horses and flees. Carl pursues him, ignoring Anna's request that he not harm Lucas. Carl catches up to Lucas and stabs him to death, saying that everyone will believe he simply fell off the horse. Months later, Ida finds Lucas's skeleton and tearfully tells him that he will soon be part of nature.

== Cast and characters ==
- Elliott Crosset Hove as Lucas
- Ingvar Eggert Sigurðsson as Ragnar
- Jacob Lohmann as Carl
- Vic Carmen Sonne as Anna
- Ída Mekkín Hlynsdóttir (Note: Real-life daughter of the director, Hlynur Pálmason.) as Ida

== Production ==
The film is a drama, written and directed by Hlynur Pálmason. Maria von Hausswolff was responsible for the cinematography, for which she won the 2023 Bodil Award for Best Cinematographer.

In the opening of the film a title card states "A box was found in Iceland with seven wet plate photographs taken by a Danish priest. These images are the first photographs of the southeast coast. This film is inspired by these photographs." However these images never existed. Hlynur invented the story to help inspire the filmmaking process. As part of the filming, several wet plate photographs were taken, one of which was used for the film's poster.

== Release ==
The film premiered in the Un Certain Regard program of the Cannes Film Festival on 24 May 2022, and had its North American premiere at the 2022 Toronto International Film Festival in September. It was distributed by Sena in Iceland; Scanbox Entertainment in Denmark; Folkets Bio in Sweden;.and Jour2Fête in France. Godland was released in Denmark on 1 December 2022. It was released in cinemas as well as on Curzon Home Cinema in the UK on 7 April 2023, and in Australian cinemas on 17 August 2023.

== Reception ==
On the review aggregator website Rotten Tomatoes, 92% of 66 critics' reviews are positive, with an average rating of 8/10. The website's consensus reads: "Necessarily bleak but shot through with moments of humor, the beautifully filmed Godland serves as a gently absorbing meditation on mortality." Metacritic, which uses a weighted average, assigned the film a score of 81 out of 100, based on 21 critics, indicating "universal acclaim".

Peter Bradshaw of The Guardian gave it five out of five stars, calling it "an extraordinary film... breathtaking in its epic scale, magnificent in its comprehension of landscape, piercingly uncomfortable in its human intimacy and severity." He wrote that it brings to mind such films as Werner Herzog's Aguirre, the Wrath of God and Roland Joffé's The Mission, among others. Paul Byrnes of The Sydney Morning Herald called it "bone-chilling, eye-dazzling, heart-wrenching... and one of the best films of the year."

== Awards ==
The film was selected as Denmark's 2022 submission for the Nordic Council Film Prize.

The film and its director were nominated for many awards and won several of them, including:

- Look Prize for Best Film, Oostende Film Festival, Belgium
- Zabaltegi-Tabakalera Prize, San Sebastian Film Festival, Spain
- Honourable Mention, Best Film, London Film Festival, UK
- Gold Hugo for Best Feature Film, Chicago Film Festival, U.S.
- Best Feature Film, Riga International Film Festival, Riga

Hlynur Pálmason won the Edda Award for Best Director at the Icelandic Edda Awards in 2023.

Maria von Hausswolff won the Silver Hugo for cinematography, Bodil Award for Best Cinematographer, and Best Cinematography at the Edda Awards.

Elliott Crosset Hove won the Bodil Award for Best Actor in a Leading Role.

== See also ==
- List of submissions to the 96th Academy Awards for Best International Feature Film
- List of Icelandic submissions for the Academy Award for Best International Feature Film
