= Riga International Film Festival =

Annual film festival in Riga, Latvia

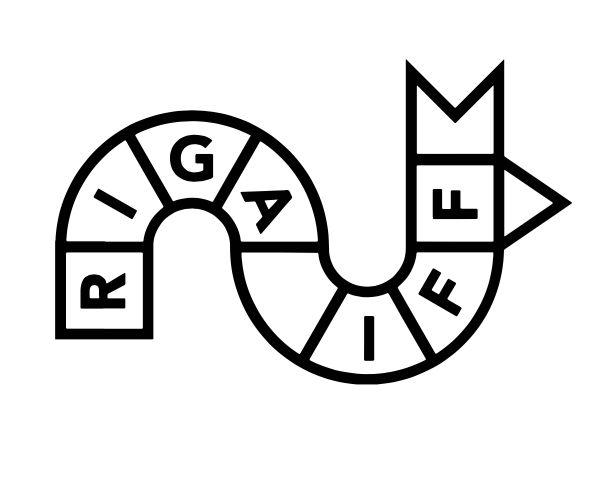
- RIGA IFF logo
- Location: Riga, Latvia
- Founded: 2014
- Awards: Rooster award
- Website: rigaiff.lv/en/

The Riga International Film Festival (Latvian: Rīgas Starptautiskais kino festivāls; abbreviated RIGA IFF) is an annual international film festival held in Riga, Latvia. It was launched in 2014 during Riga's year as a European Capital of Culture, and continued as a recurring autumn festival from 2015. Its programme includes feature films, short films, children's and youth cinema, retrospectives, Baltic and Nordic cinema, and industry events. The festival presents a main award in its Feature Film Competition, and its short-film competition is part of the European Film Academy Short Film Network.

== History ==
RIGA IFF began in December 2014, in the final month of Riga's European Capital of Culture year. The first edition was presented as a ten-day programme with 139 screenings of recent and classic European films. In 2015 the festival returned as an October event with more than 80 films, director meetings, workshops, discussions, thematic programmes and an official competition programme.

The third edition was scheduled for 13–23 October 2016 and was described by Film New Europe as a festival for films from the Baltic Sea region, the Nordic countries and other European countries. The same year, the festival expanded its industry activity under the RIGA IFF Forum name, including project pitching sessions, a Critics' Meeting and a European Script Meeting.

In 2019, RIGA IFF was held from 17 to 27 October and included 148 films across 11 themed sections and competition programmes. The opening film was Away, directed by Latvian filmmaker Gints Zilbalodis. The 2020 edition was the festival's first hybrid edition, combining physical screenings with online screenings; it presented 129 films in 10 thematic programmes.

The 2021 edition was initially organised in a hybrid format but moved fully online from 21 October after Latvia entered a COVID-19 lockdown. Its lineup included more than 100 films in 10 thematic sections, several competitions and an industry section. The 2023 edition was the festival's tenth edition and included 84 films competing for awards.

The 11th edition took place from 17 to 27 October 2024, with a Feature Film Competition centred on films from the Baltic Sea region and Scandinavian countries, alongside festival selections, retrospectives and industry events. The 12th edition was held from 16 to 26 October 2025, with nine titles from Denmark, Latvia, Lithuania, Norway, Ukraine and Sweden selected for the Feature Film Competition.

== Programme and competitions ==
The festival programme combines competition sections with curated thematic programmes. Its Feature Film Competition focuses on works from the Baltic Sea region and the Nordic countries, while other sections have included short-film competitions, children's and youth cinema, Baltic music videos, retrospectives, festival selections and special thematic strands. In 2021, the festival opened submissions for six competition sections, including the main feature competition, KIDS' REEL, international and national short-film competitions, and Baltic music videos.

The festival's short-film section is linked to the European Film Academy Short Film Network. The network consists of festivals with international short-film competitions, and each participating festival selects one candidate for the annual European Film Awards short-film category.

The festival has also presented Latvian and Baltic premieres, international festival titles, and programmes for local and international audiences. In 2023, the RIGA IFF awards ceremony was opened to worldwide audiences through a livestream for the first time.

== Industry programme ==
RIGA IFF has included industry events for film professionals alongside public screenings. In 2016, the RIGA IFF Forum included pitching sessions for feature and documentary projects, the Critics' Meeting and the European Script Meeting. In 2019, the Magnetic Latvia Film Conference took place during the festival and focused on the development of the Northern European film market.

The industry section later included the RIGA IFF Showcase co-production market. In 2025, the fourth Showcase selected 12 projects, including nine feature films and three series from the Baltic states and Eastern and Central Europe. In 2026, the Forum opened submissions for RIGA IFF Showcase and SHORT RIGA Test Screenings, with feature, series and short-film projects eligible for industry feedback and presentation.

== Awards ==
The Feature Film Competition presents the festival's main Rooster award. LSM English described the 2020 main prize as the bronze Rooster of Riga, while later Film New Europe coverage referred to the main competition award as the Golden Rooster Award.

Selected Feature Film Competition winners include:

Year	Film	Director
2020	Conference	Ivan I. Tverdovsky
2021	Runner	Andrius Blaževičius
2022	Godland	Hlynur Pálmason
2023	Family Time	Tia Kouvo
2024	Songs of the Slow Burning Earth	Olha Zhurba
2025	The Visitor	Vytautas Katkus

== See also ==
- Cinema of Latvia
- European Film Awards
- Riga International Short Film Festival 2ANNAS
