= Mikkel Bryggers Gade =

Street in Copenhagen, Denmark

Nørrebrogade
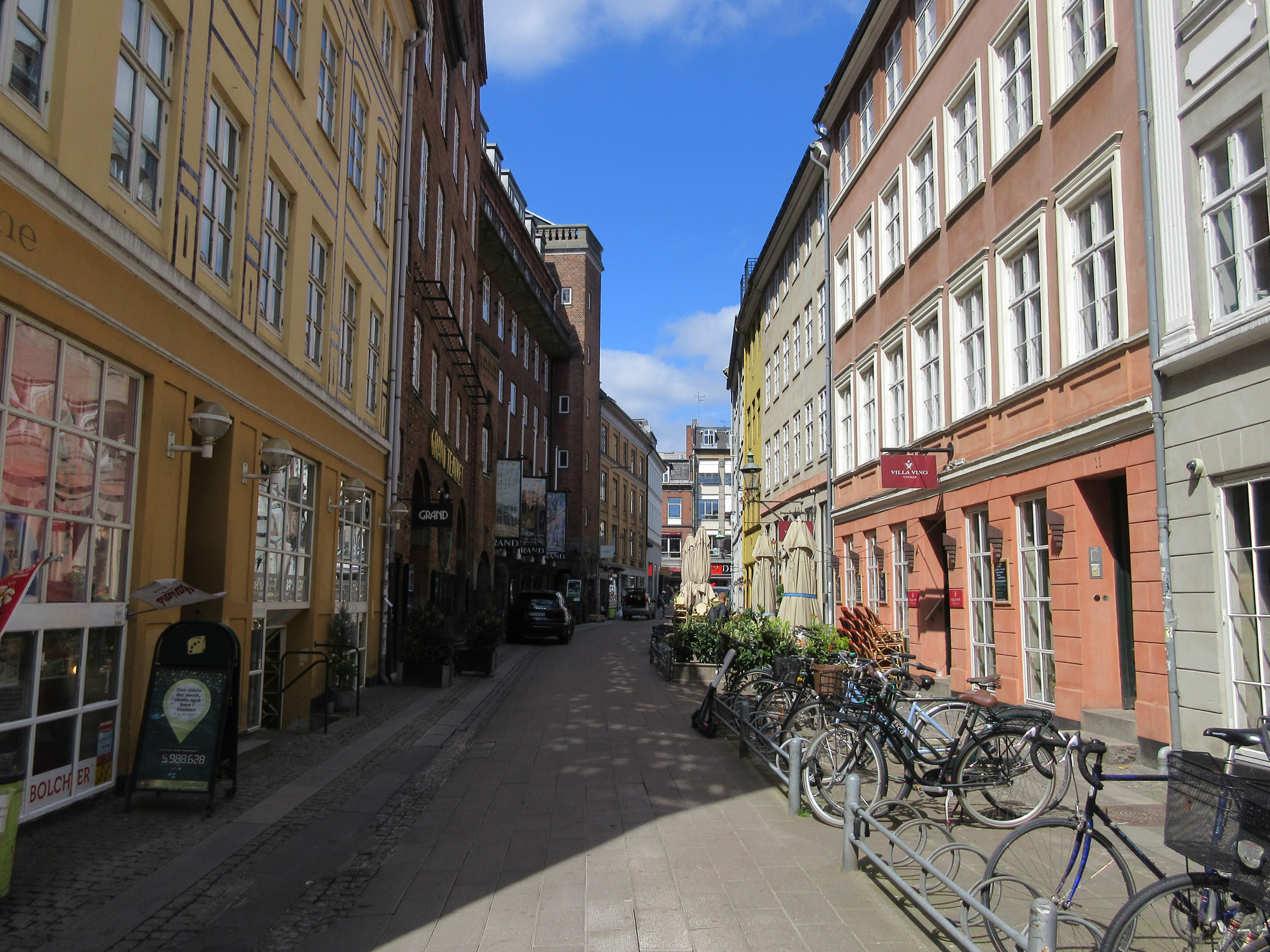
- Interactive map of Nørrebrogade
- Length: 97 m (318 ft)
- Location: Copenhagen, Denmark
- Quarter: Indre By
- Postal code: 1460
- Nearest metro station: Rådhuspladsen station
- Coordinates: 55°40′35.91″N 12°34′15.62″E
- North end: Frederiksberggade
- South end: Lavendelstræde

Mikkel Bryggers Gade is a pedestrianized street in the Old Town of Copenhagen, Denmark. It runs from Frederiksberggade in the north to Lavendelstræde in the south. The art cinema Grand Teatret is located in the street. It is based in the large Palace Hotel complex.

== History ==
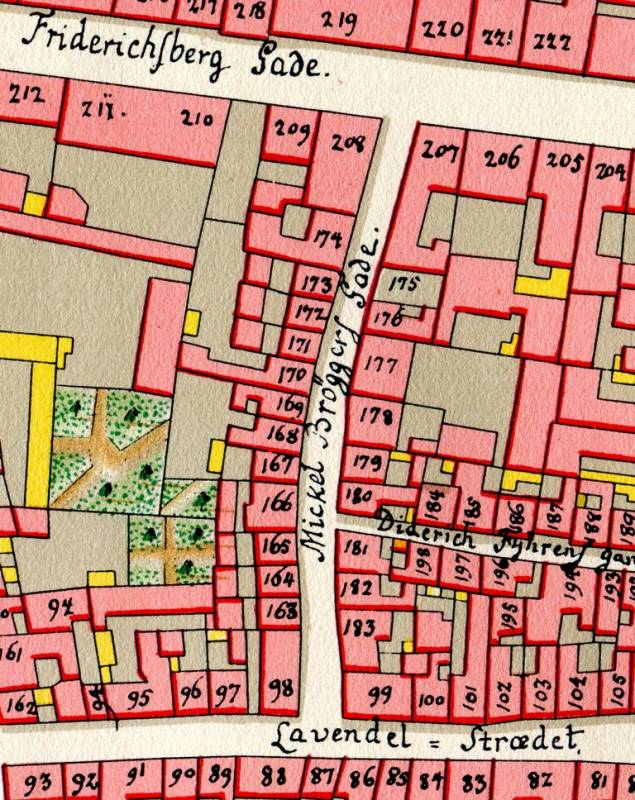
Mikkel Bryggers Gade seen on Gedde's district map

The street was in the Middle Ages situated just inside the moat and possibly a rampart that surrounded the original settlement of Havn. It was from at least 1529 known as Pugestræde. The street may then have continued all the way to Garvergade in the south and continued in the no longer existing street Vombadstuestræde in the north.

The current name is seen from 1617. The name refers to Mikkel Thomsen Brygger who owned a large property at the corner with present-day Frederiksborggade from the 1580s and until at least 1600.

The two narrow alleys Hellig Kors Stræde and Henrick (or Diderik) Fyhrens Gang linked the east side of the street to Kattesundet but were not rebuilt after the Copenhagen Fire of 1795.

== Notable buildings ==
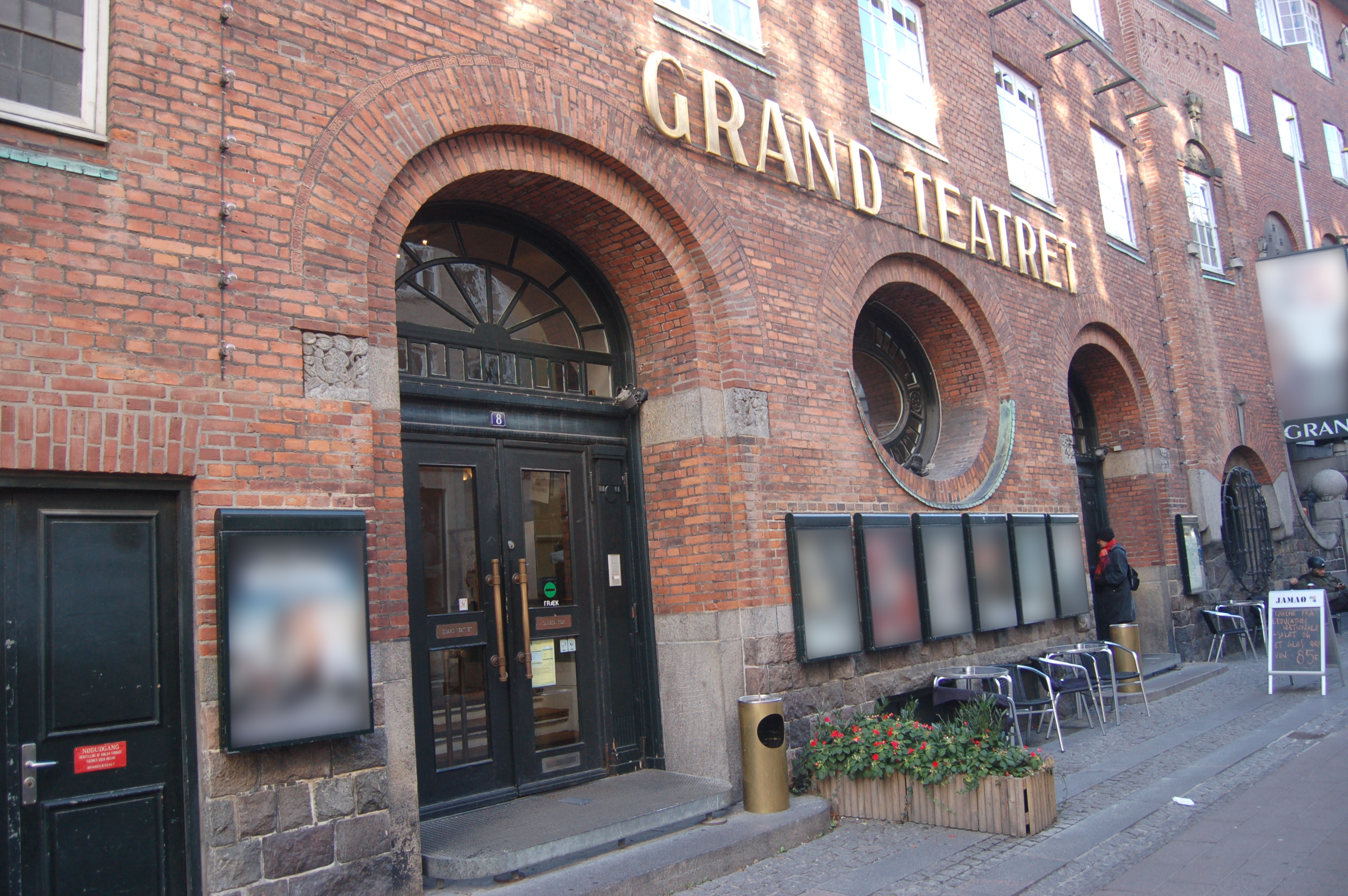
The Grand Theatre in Mikkel Bryggers Gade

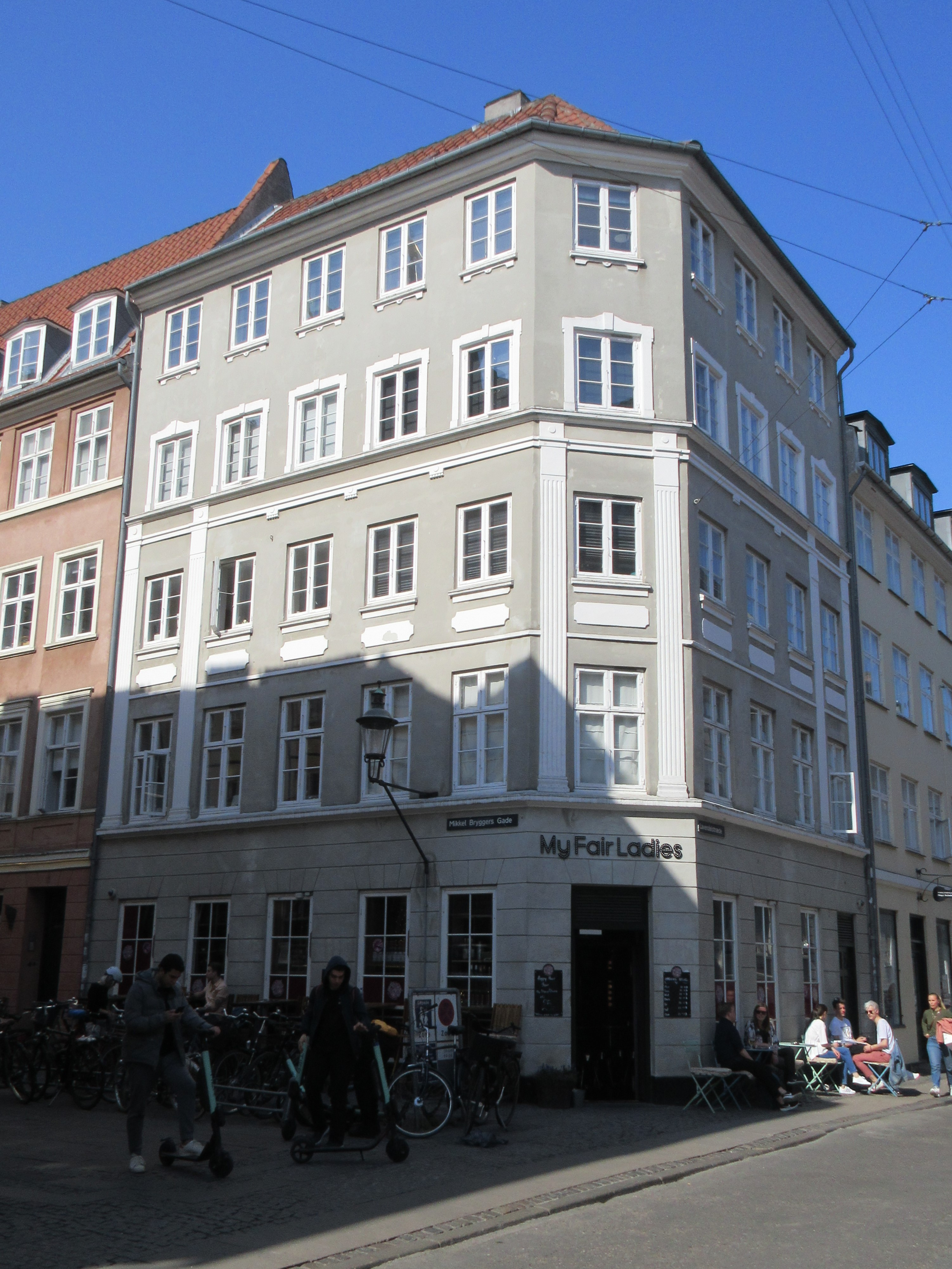
No. 11

Grand Teatret (No. 8) traves its history back to 1926. The building is from 1910 and was designed by Anton Rosen. It was listed in the Danish registry of protected buildings and places in 1958.

Many of the other buildings date from the years after the Copenhagen Fire of 1795 No. 11 is from 1798.

== Cultural references ==
In the 1954 drama film Hendes store aften, Helle Virkner is seen throwing some counterfeit money into the sewer.

== Transport ==
The nearest metro station is Rådhuspladsen on the City Circle Line. There is bicycle parking in both ends of the street.
