= Løvenborg =

Løvenborg may refer to:

- Løvenborg, Copenhagen, a Jugenstil building in Copenhagen
- Løvenborg, Holbæk Municipality, a manor house at Holbæk, Denmark
