= Grand Theatre (Copenhagen) =

Cinema in Copenhagen, Denmark

Coordinates: 55.6765°N 12.5709°E

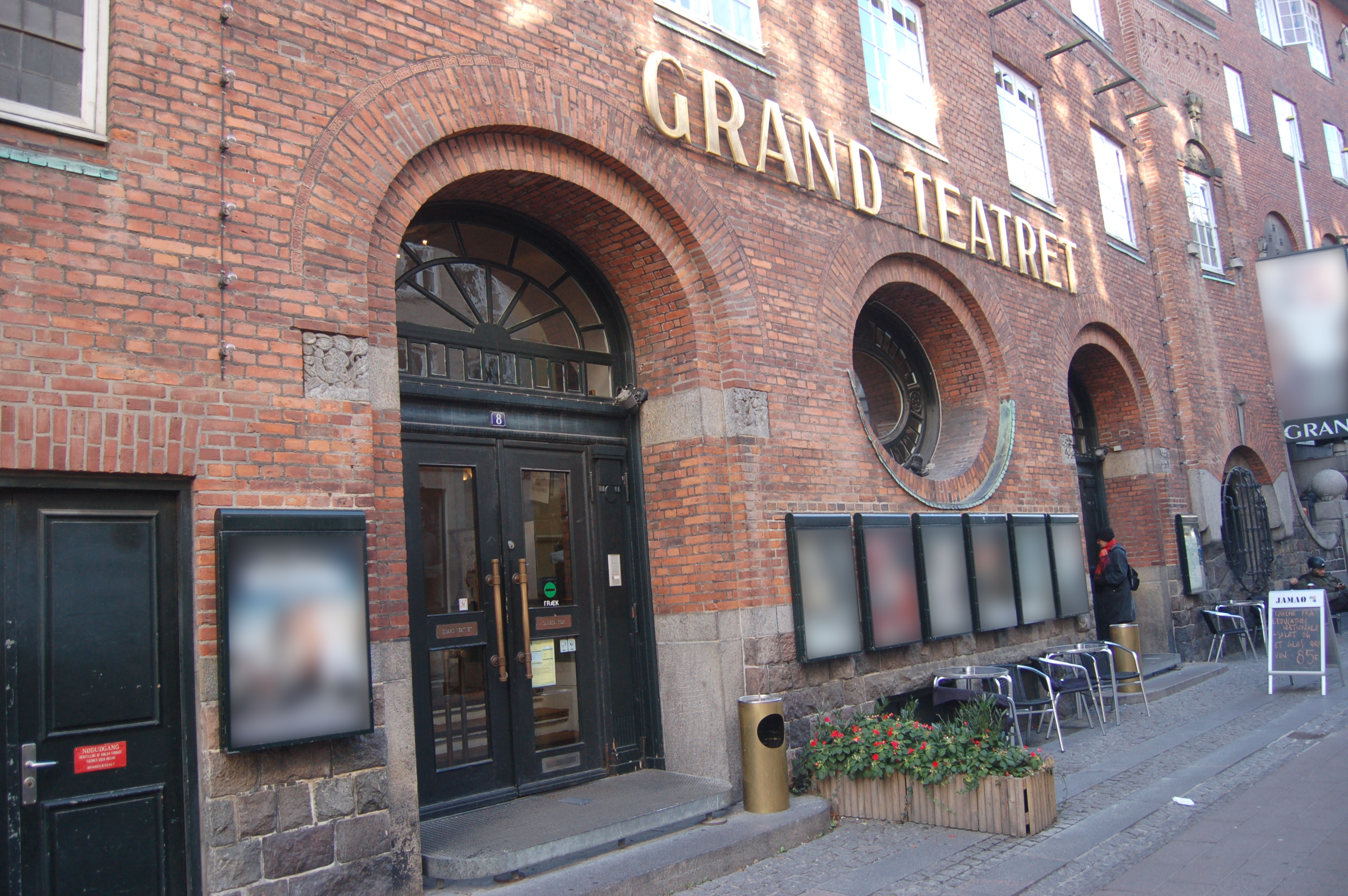
The Grand Theatre in Mikkel Bryggers Gade

The Grand Theatre (Danish: Grand Teatret), located in Mikkel Bryggers Gade (No. 9), a small side street off Strøget, is one of the oldest cinemas in Copenhagen, Denmark. The cinema is based in the rear side of the Palace Hotel complex on City Hall Square. The building was completed to an Art Deco design by Anton Rosen in 1910. It was listed in the Danish Registry of Protected Buildings and Places in 1993.

== History ==
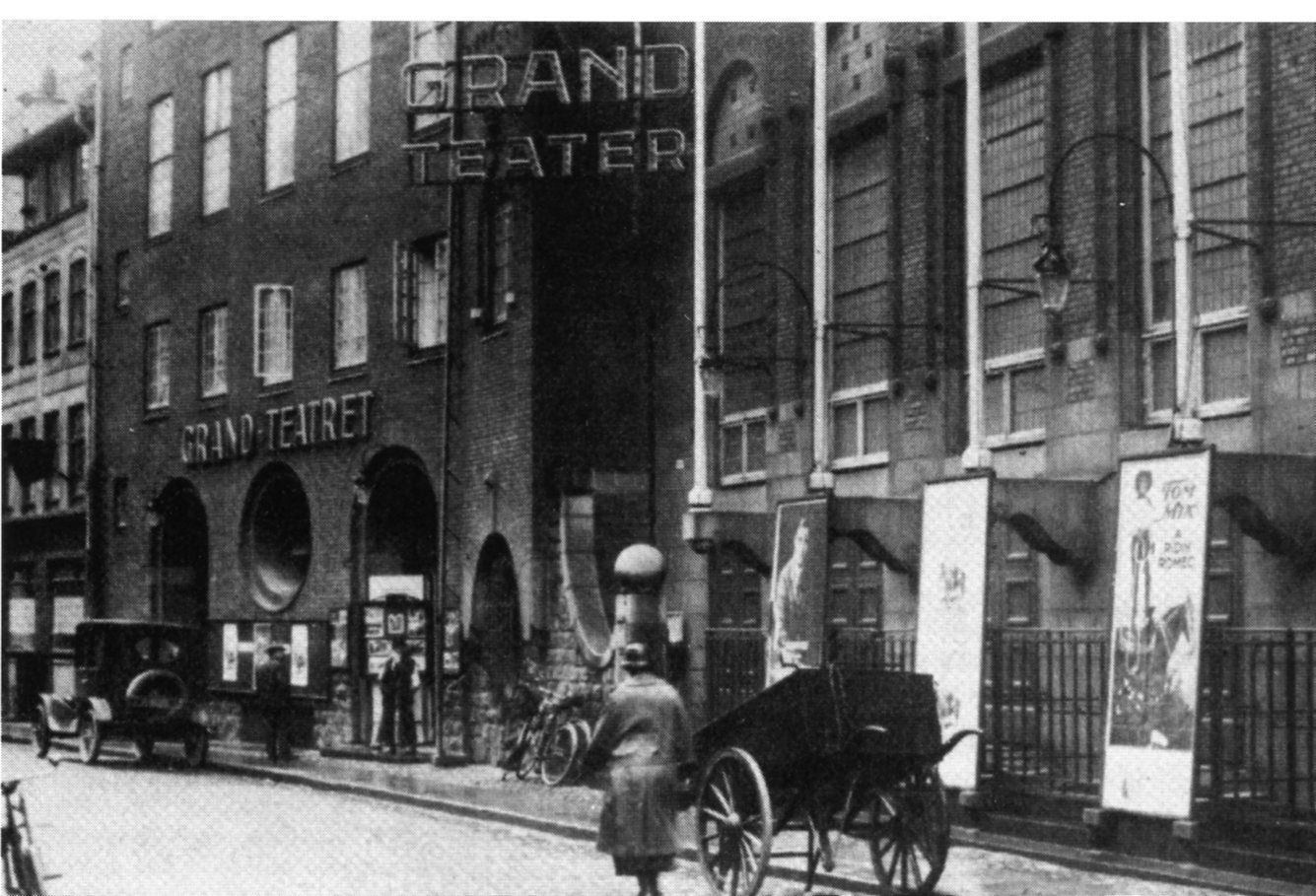
The Empire Theater shortly after its opening in 1913

The cinema is located on the rear side of the block which also contains the Palace Hotel on City Hall Square, Copenhagen's most fashionable hotel at the time of its opening in 1910. The entire block was designed by the architect Anton Rosen. The first cinema at the site opened on 26 December 1913. It was known as Empire Theatre and based in the Palace Hotel's Grand Hall which had originally been built as a concert hall accessed from Mikkel Bryggers Gade. The director at the time was Walter Christmas. The cinema changed its name to Metropol Theatre the following year, now with Sofus Madsen as managing director.

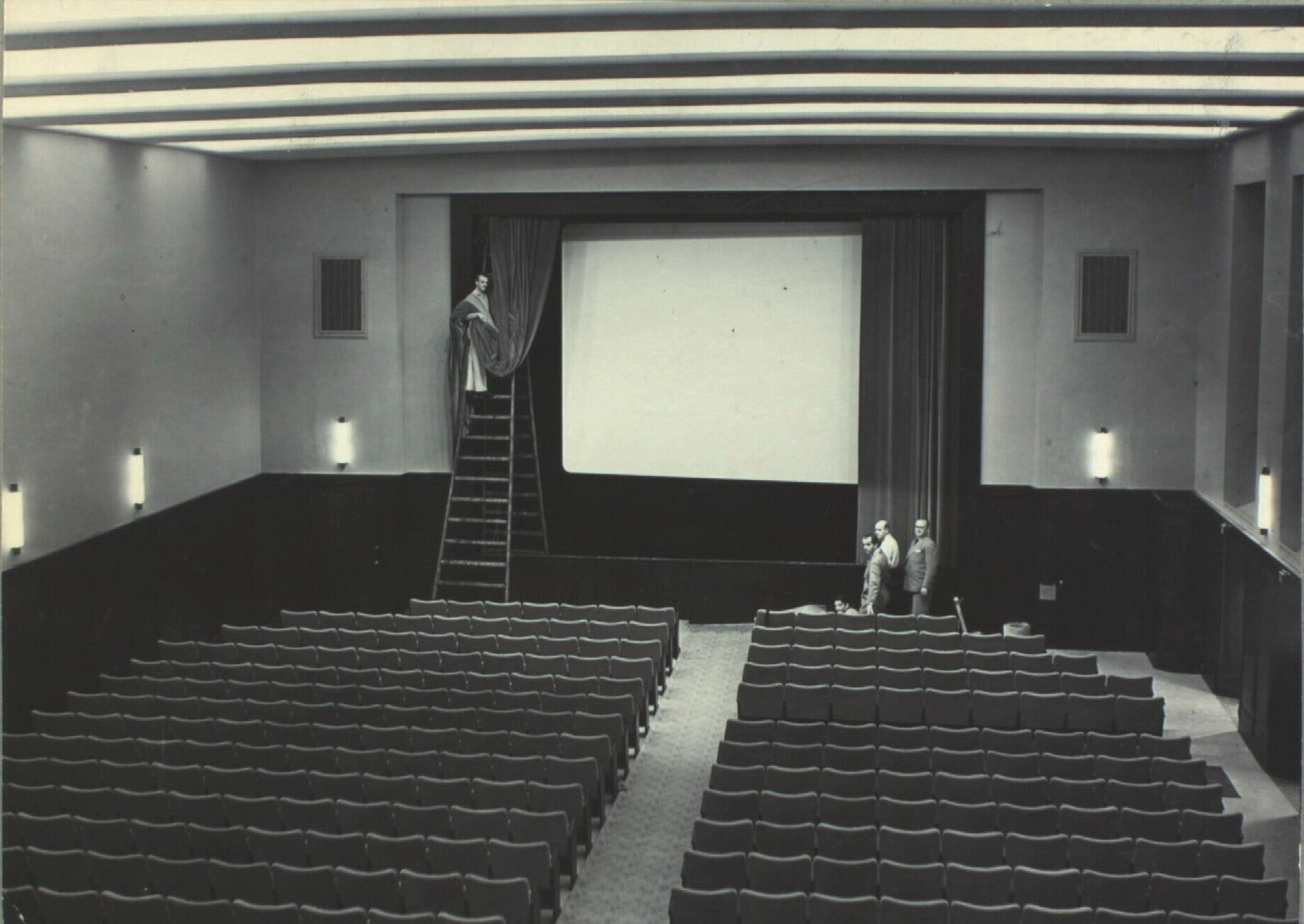
Grand Teatret photographed on 16 August 1939 by Holger Damgaard

In 1923, Metropol Theatre moved to Frederiksberggade. Its old premises were taken over by the film director Urban Gad who had recently returned to Copenhagen from Germany where he had worked since 1911. He reopened the cinema under the name Grand Theatre on 2 April as a venue for quality film. In 1939 the cinema was temporarily closed while the Grand Hall was converted into the auditorium today known as Grand 3. After Urban Gad's death in 1948, his wife Esther took over the cinema.

On 1 August 1974, Peter Emil Refn and Kai Michelsen took over the Grand Teatret after Esther Gad. They had previously founded Camera Film, a distribution company specializing in the import of Japanese, Swedish, and French films to the Danish market. In 1976, they expanded the cinema with two new auditoria in addition to the old one which became known as Grand 3, and in 1977 it was followed by Grand 4 and Grand 5. Kai Michelsen left the management in 1979. Up through the 1970s and early 1980s, Grand gained a reputation as the "French" cinema in Copenhagen. The editor Palle Fogtdal bought a fifty percent share in Grand Theatre/Camera Film in 1984 but sold it again to Annette Trampedach in 1991.

After Peter Emil Refn's death in 1994, Kirsten Dalgaard and Annette Trampedach took over the responsibility for the cinema. They were succeeded by Kim Foss in 1996. All six auditoria underwent renovations and modernisations between 1998 and 2012.

== Auditoria ==
The cinema has six auditoria with a total of 773 seats. The largest auditorium (Grand 3) seats 326.

== Repertoire ==
The repertoire consists mainly of European-quality films. It is a member of the EU supported Europa Cinemas collaboration. Some of its films are imported directly through its own distribution company, Camera Film, which is represented every year at the Cannes Film Festival.

== Awards ==
In 1993, Peter Emil Refn received an Honorary Robert for his contribution to Danish cinema through the Grand Theatre and Camera Films. In 2006, Grand Theatre received the award for Europe's best cinema at the Europa Cinemas Awards. In 2011, Kim Foss received the French Ordre des Arts et des Lettres in recognition of his contribution to French culture.
