= Palace Hotel (Copenhagen) =

Building in Copenhagen, Denmark

Coordinates: 55.676266°N 12.570081°E

General information
- Location: Copenhagen, Denmark
- Opening: 15 July 1910; 116 years ago

Design and construction
- Architect: Anton Rosen

Other information
- Number of rooms: 162
- Number of restaurants: 1

Website
- Official website

Palace Hotel is a residential hotel on the eastern side of City Hall Square in Copenhagen, Denmark. Influenced by the Art Nouveau style, the red brick building was designed by Anton Rosen and completed in 1910.

== History ==
=== Site history, 1689–1907 ===
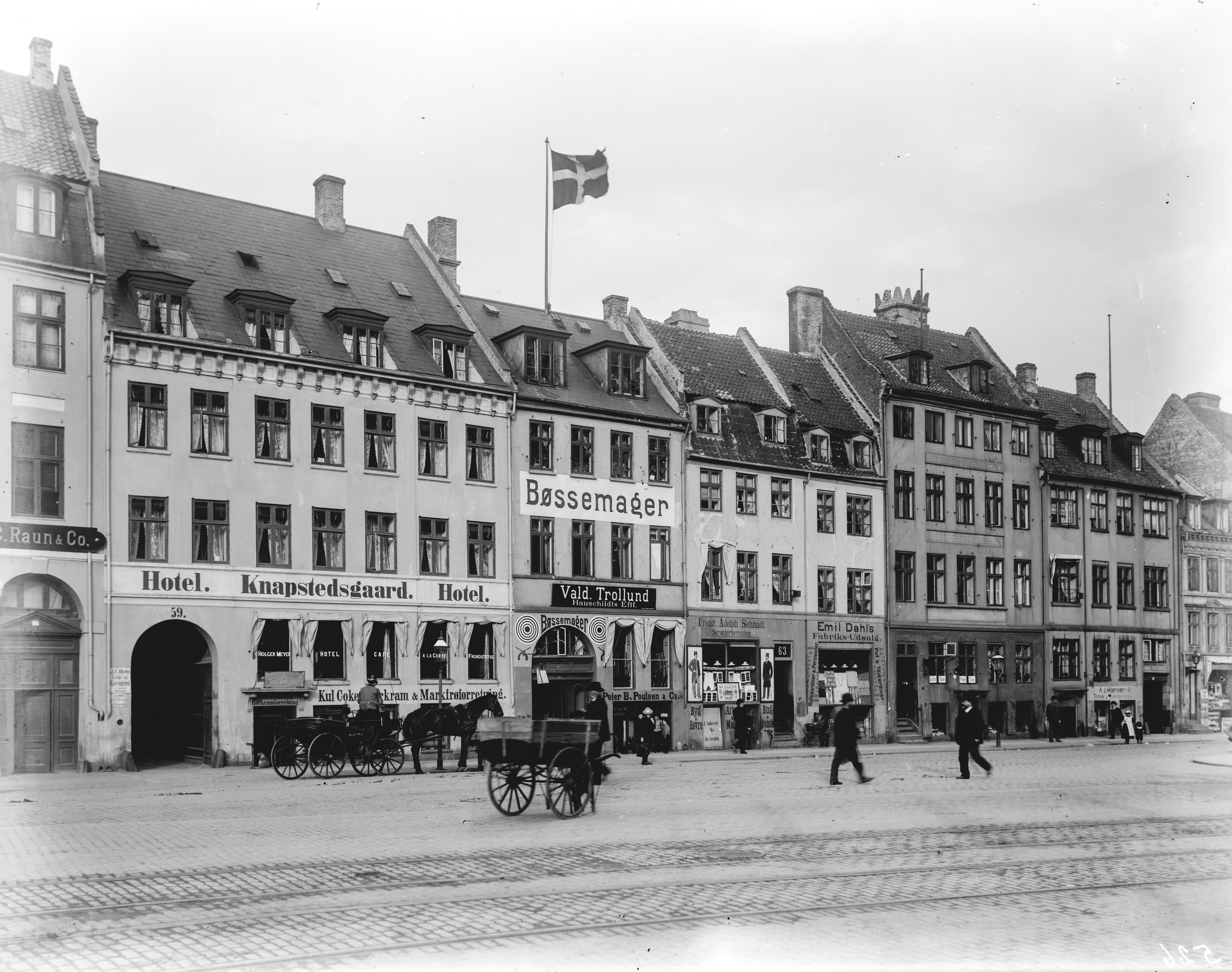
Hotel Knapstedgaard in c. 1903.

Prior to 1907, the site was made up of 11 properties. The six properties on Rådhuspladsen were listed in Copenhagen's mew cadastre of 1806 as No. 63–68 in Western Quarter. The five properties on Mikkel Bryggers Gade were listed as No. 96–100 in Western Quarter.

Knapstedgaard (No. 64) was one of the city's more well-known hostels. With its location, just inside the city's Western City Gate (Vesterport), on the city's old haymarket, it was conviently located for travellers. The specious courtyard had room for carriages and stabling of horses.

=== Anders Jensen's hotel ===
Palace Hotel.

The hotel was built by the master butcher Anders Jensen, from 1909 alderman of the butchers' guild in Copenhagen, who had made a move into the hotel business in 1897 when he acquired Hotel Marienlyst in Helsingør. In 1907, he purchased a lot on the square in front of the new Copenhagen City Hall which had been completed in the grounds of the city's old Haymarket just two years earlier. The architect Anton Rosen was commissioned to design the hotel which was inaugurated on 15 July 1910. King Frederik VIII was among the first to visit the hotel. Rosen not only designed the building but also everything from furniture to wallpaper, textiles, uniforms, luggage tags and keys. He also designed cutlery and door handles in collaboration with Georg Jensen.

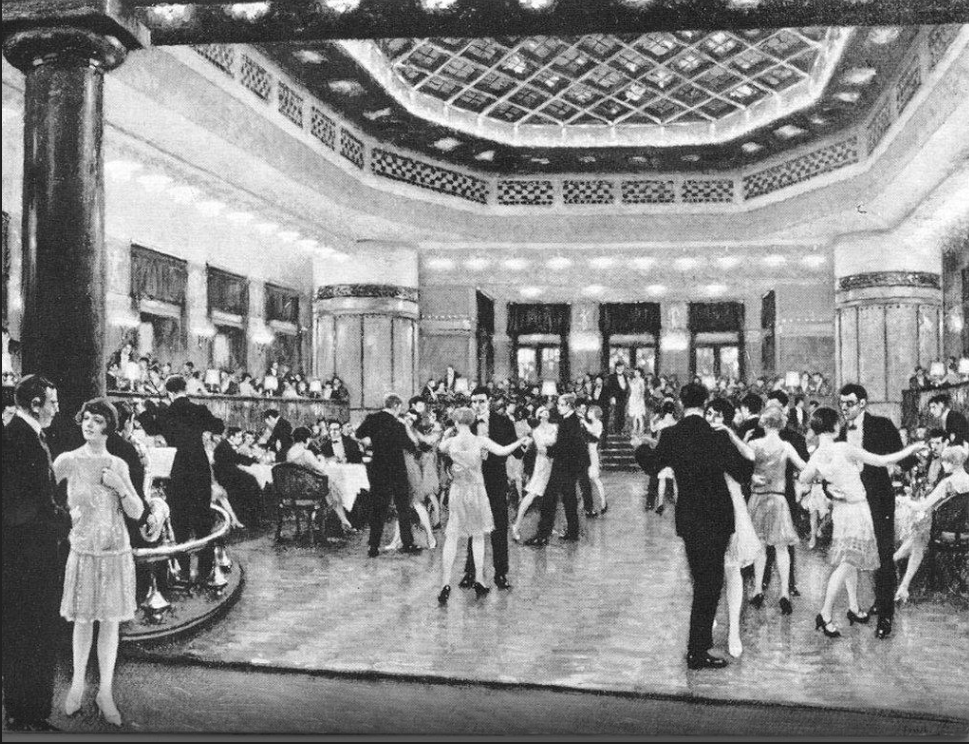
The ballroom

In 1927, Jensen sold the hotel to Valdemar Nielsen, who changed its original name "Palads" to the more international "Palace Hotel" and spent a large sum on refurbishing its interiors. In 1937, the hotel changed hands once again when it was acquired by the Danish-Norwegian hotelier Waldemar Jensen. Assisted by his Hungarian architects, he converted the Marble Garden into the "Ambassadeur", turning the hotel into a popular entertainment venue.

The hotel was the venue for the first and founding congress of the International Handball Federation that took place 10–13 July 1946.

The Danish businessman Fritz Schur purchased the building in November 1999. From 2005 until 2009, the hotel was managed by Starwood and renovated to upgrade it to a five-star hotel under the Le Méridien brand. After failed negotiations between Schur and Starwood, the hotel was taken over by Scandic Hotels.

== Architecture ==
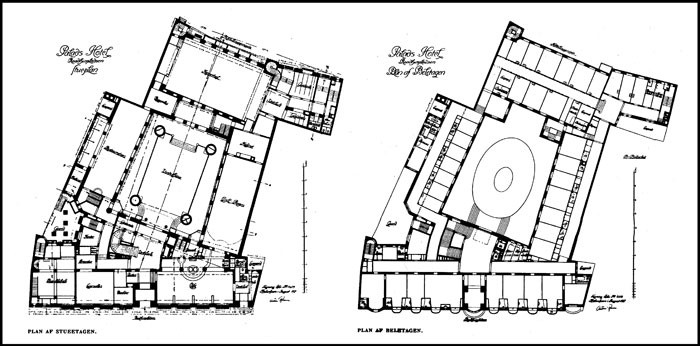
Floor plans of the hotel

The Palace Hotel building is considered one of Rosen's most important works and shows clear evidence of his appreciation of Jugendstil. He received the commission shortly after completing the Løvenborg building on nearby Vesterbrogade, the first example of the style in Denmark. The building is constructed in red brick and stands on a sandstone plinth. The portal and other details on the facade are also in sandstone. The copper canopy above the main entrance is a later addition.

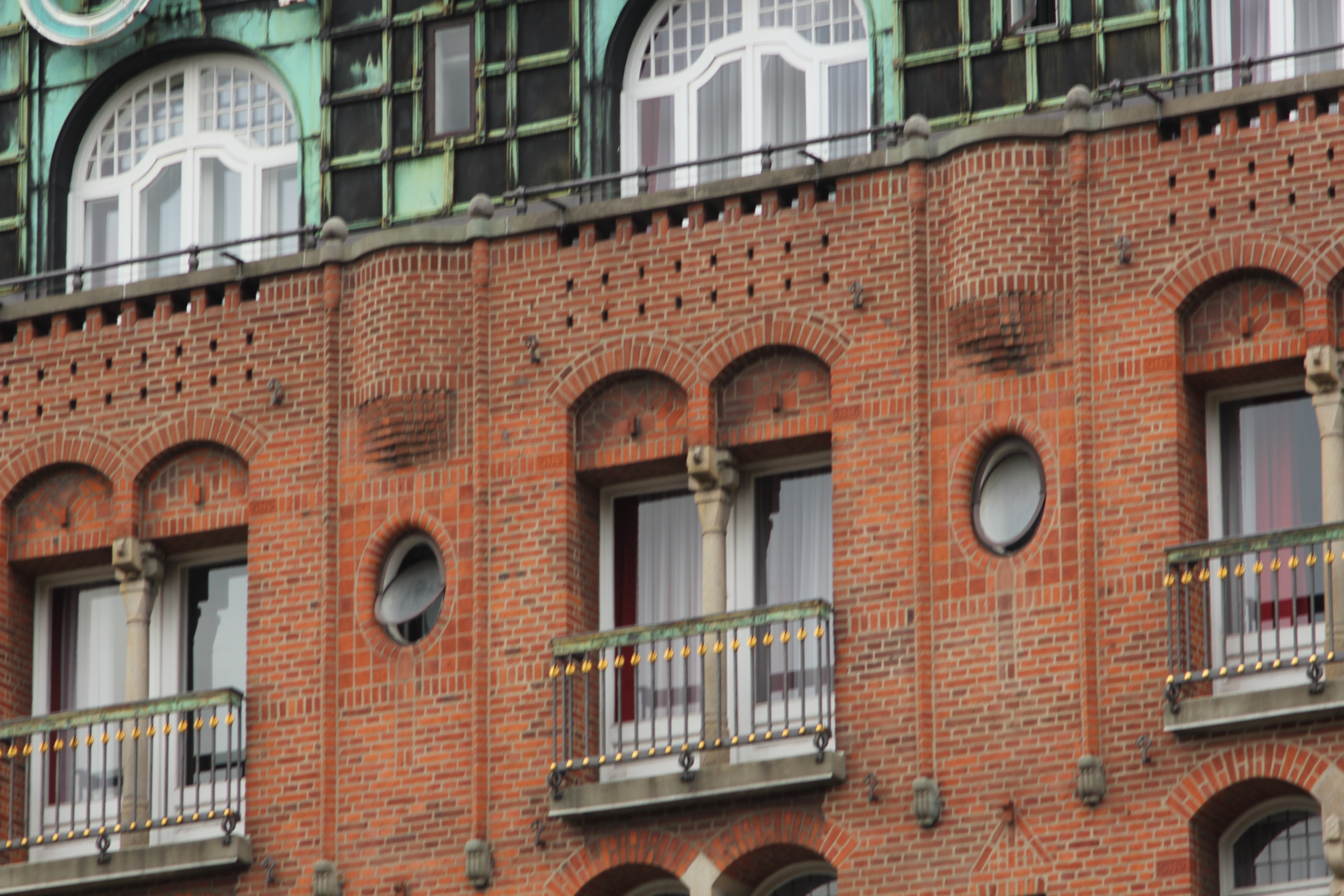
Facade detail

A distinctive feature of the exterior is the slender tower which together with those of the City Hall and the former Hotel Bristol dominates the City Hall Square. The copper-roofed tower is 65 metres (213 ft) high and decorated with mosaics by the painter Johannes Kragh on all four sides, symbolizing morning, day, evening and night. The hotel is also noted for its beautiful lobby.

Anton Rosen designed the entire block between the City Hall Square and Mikkel Bryggers Gade where the Grand Cinema is now located. It was heritage listed in 1985.

== Today ==
Palace Hotel is owned and operated by Scandic Hotels but marketed under the Summit Hotels and Resorts brand. It has 169 rooms, 40 of which have balconies overlooking the City Hall Square. Other facilities include five conference rooms and a restaurant and cocktail bar on the ground floor.

== In popular culture ==
The hotel has been used as a location in the films Dorte (1951), Hendes store aften (1954), Mariannes bryllup (1958) and Een blandt mange (1961).

== Gallery ==
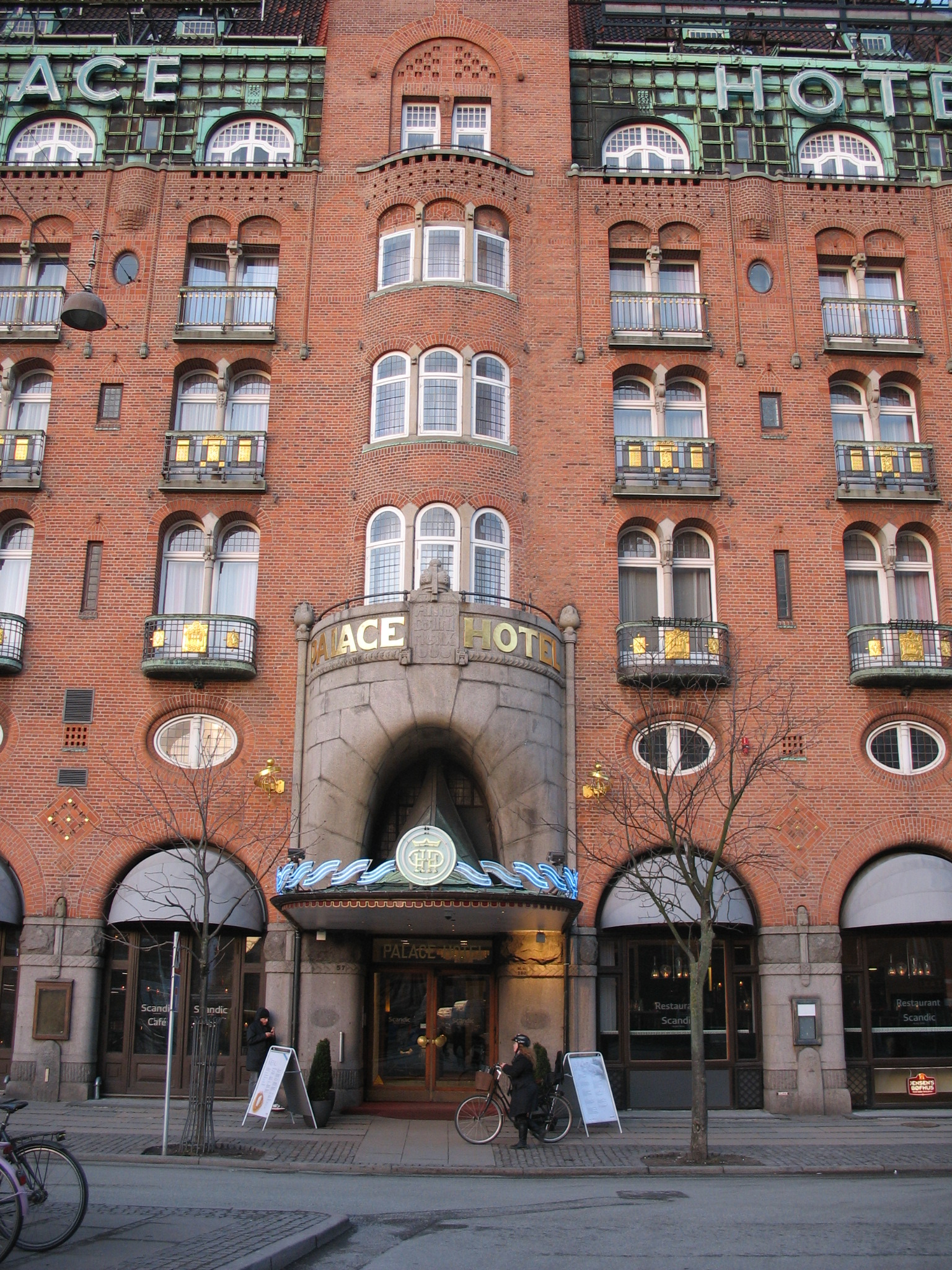
Main entrance

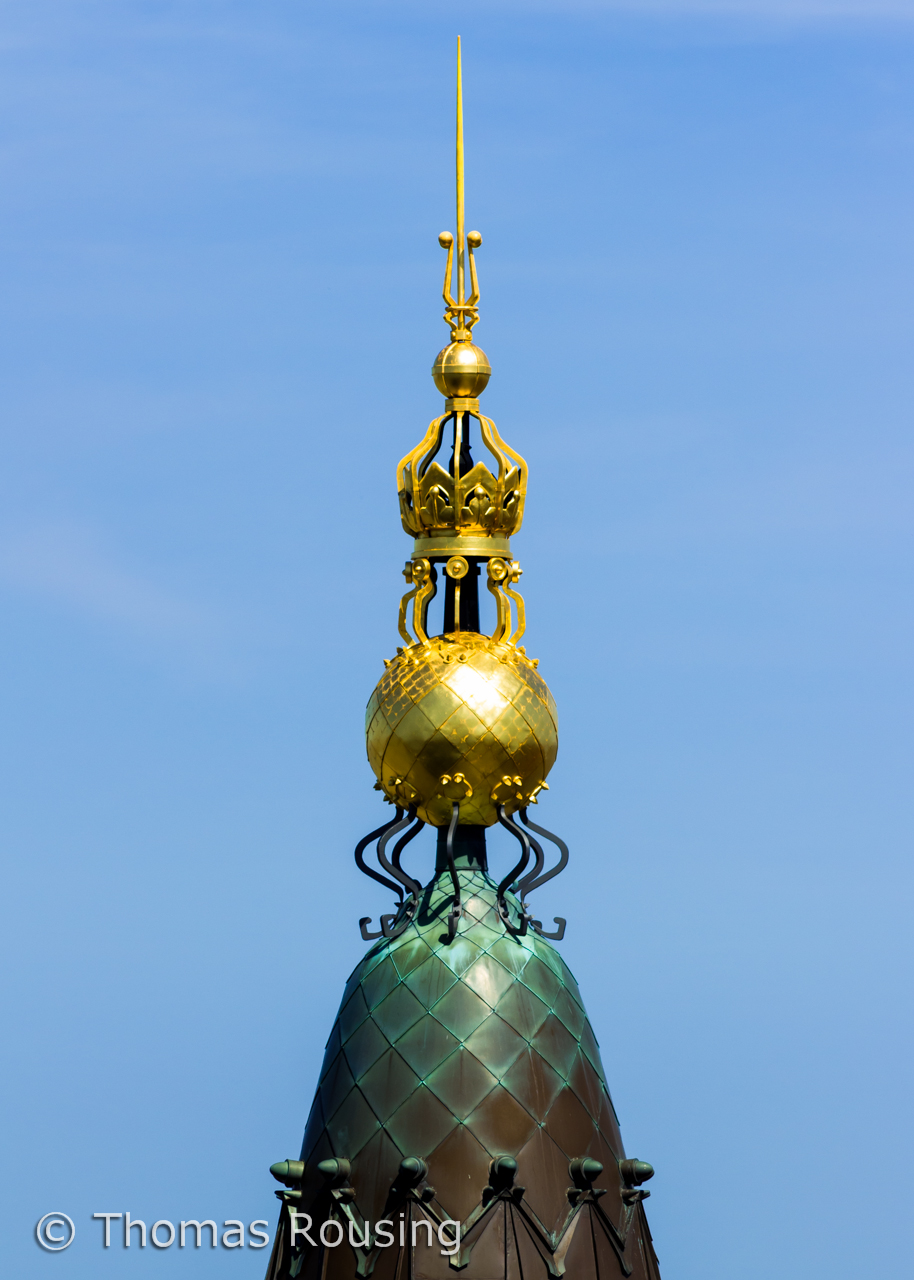
The spire
