= Anton Rosen =

Danish architect and professor (1859–1928)

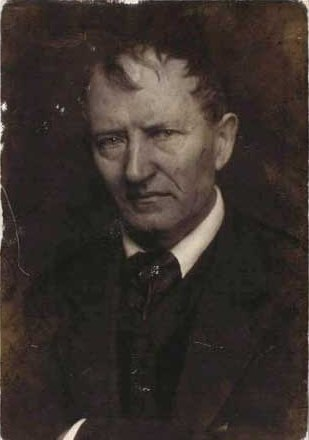
- Born: 13 September 1859; Horsens, Denmark
- Died: 2 July 1928 (aged 68); Copenhagen
- Occupation: Architect
- Buildings: Palace Hotel, Copenhagen; Tuborg Building, Hellerup

Signature
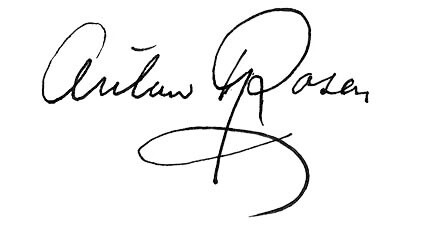

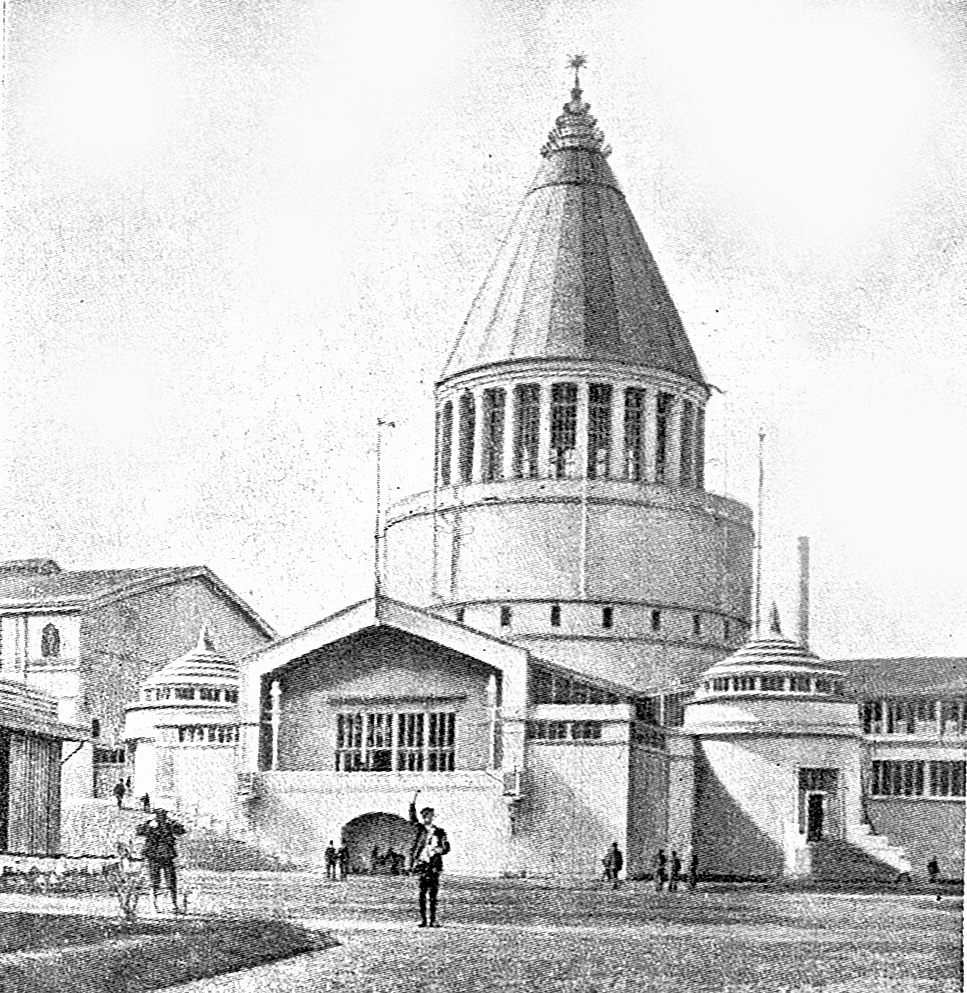
Electricity Building at the Danish National Exhibition of 1909 at Århus

Anton Rosen (13 September 1859 – 2 July 1928) was a Danish architect, furniture designer, decorative artist and professor at the Royal Danish Academy of Fine Arts. In his architecture, he combined a free Historicist style with inspiration from contemporary English architecture and details influenced by Jugendstil.

== Early life and education ==
Anton Rosen was born at Horsens in Jutland, Denmark. He was the son of Carl Julius Rosen, master mason at the Royal Danish Theatre. The family moved to Copenhagen where he attended the Copenhagen Technical College. In 1877, Rosen was accepted into the Royal Danish Academy of Fine Arts . He graduated in 1882.

== Career ==
After graduating in 1882 he was employed with Vilhelm Dahlerup and in 1883 moved to Silkeborg to oversee the construction of Silkeborg Bath. In 1889 Rosen was married to the daughter of a local hotel owner, which gave him a personal attachment to Silkeborg which was to last and over the years he left a considerable mark on the cityscape of the young town with buildings such as Silkeborg Watertower and the chimney at Silkeborg Paperworks. The time with Vilhelm Dahlerup, until 1884 and again from 1890 to 1896, had great influence on his later works.

Rosen participated in many of the large exhibitions which were popular around the turn of the century, including as the main architect of the Danish National Exhibition of 1909 at Århus. The success with the latter made him a titular professor at the Academy of Fine Arts and won him its gold medal as well as the Eckersberg Medal, with support from Hack Kampmann and Heinrich Wenck among others.

== Selected buildings ==
- Silkeborg Watertower, Silkeborg (1902)
- Vibensgaard, Copenhagen (1903–05)
- Løvenborg, Vesterbrogade 34, Copenhagen (1906)
- Vesterbrogade 40-42, Copenhagen (1909)
- Palace Hotel, Copenhagen (1907–10)
- Ole Rømer Observatory, Århus (1910–11)
- Tuborg Factories, Hellerup (1912–14)

== Gallery ==
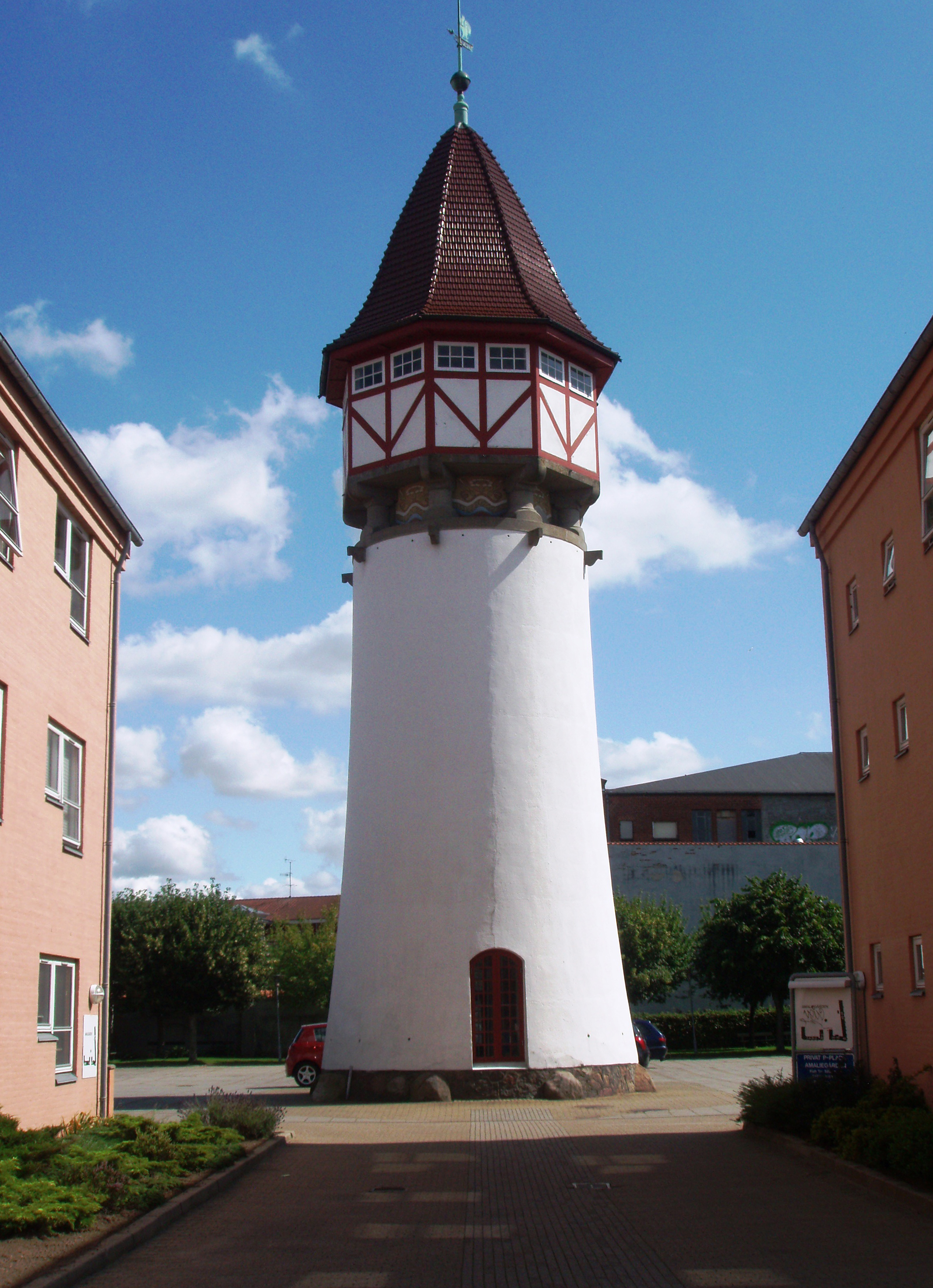
Silkeborg Watertower, Silkeborg (1902)

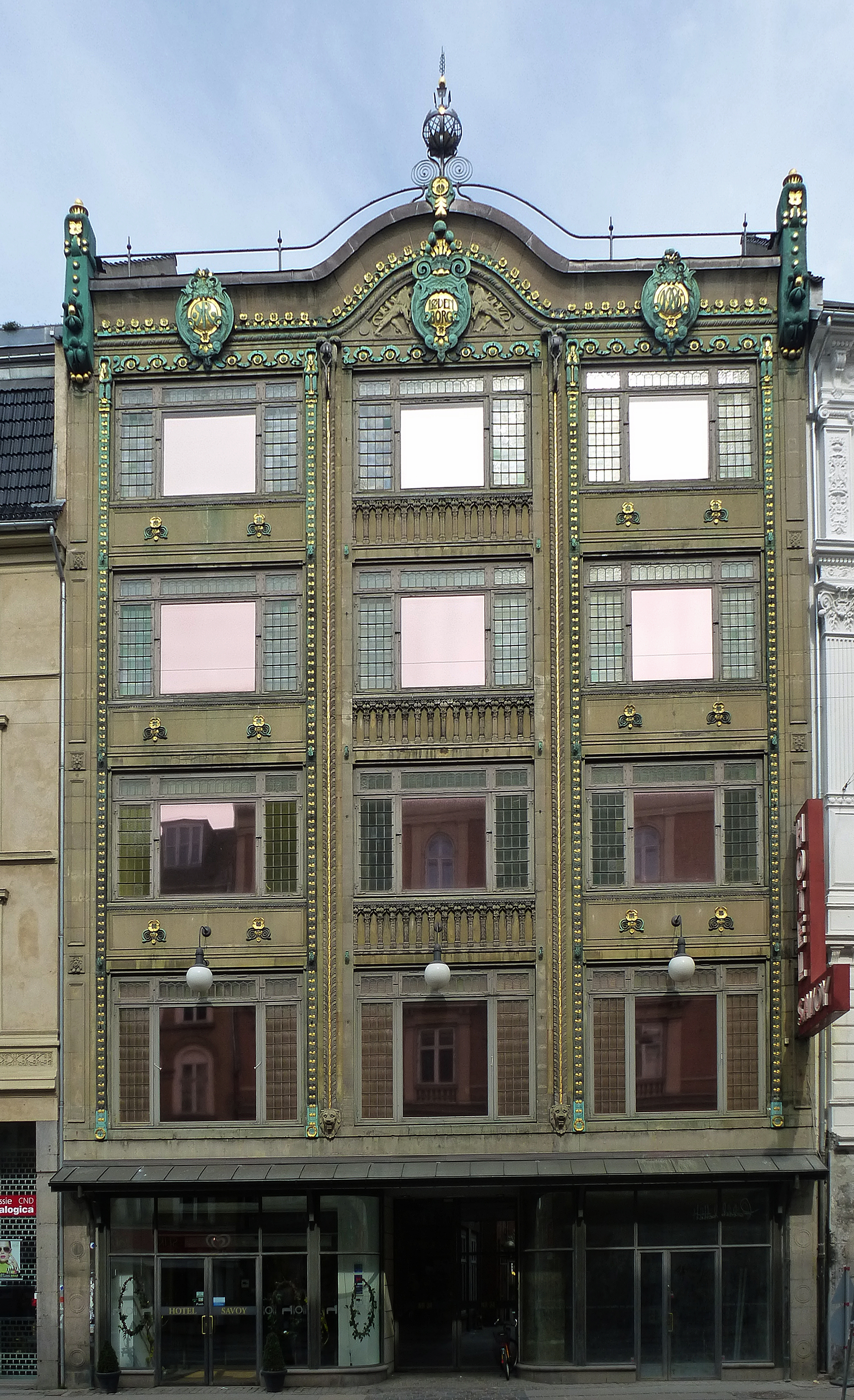
Løvenborg, Vesterbrogade 34, Copenhagen (1906)

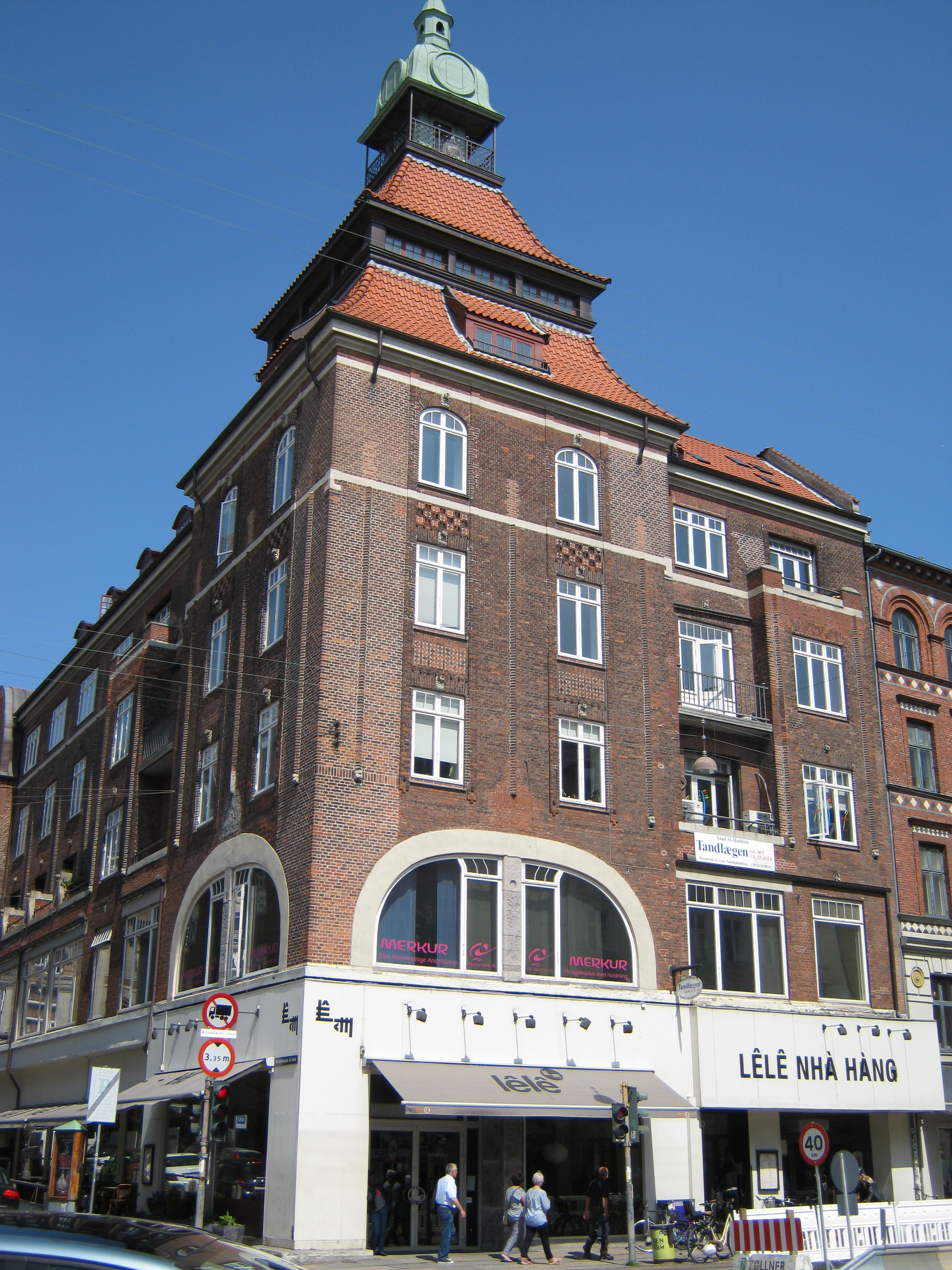
Vesterbrogade 40-42, Copenhagen (1909)

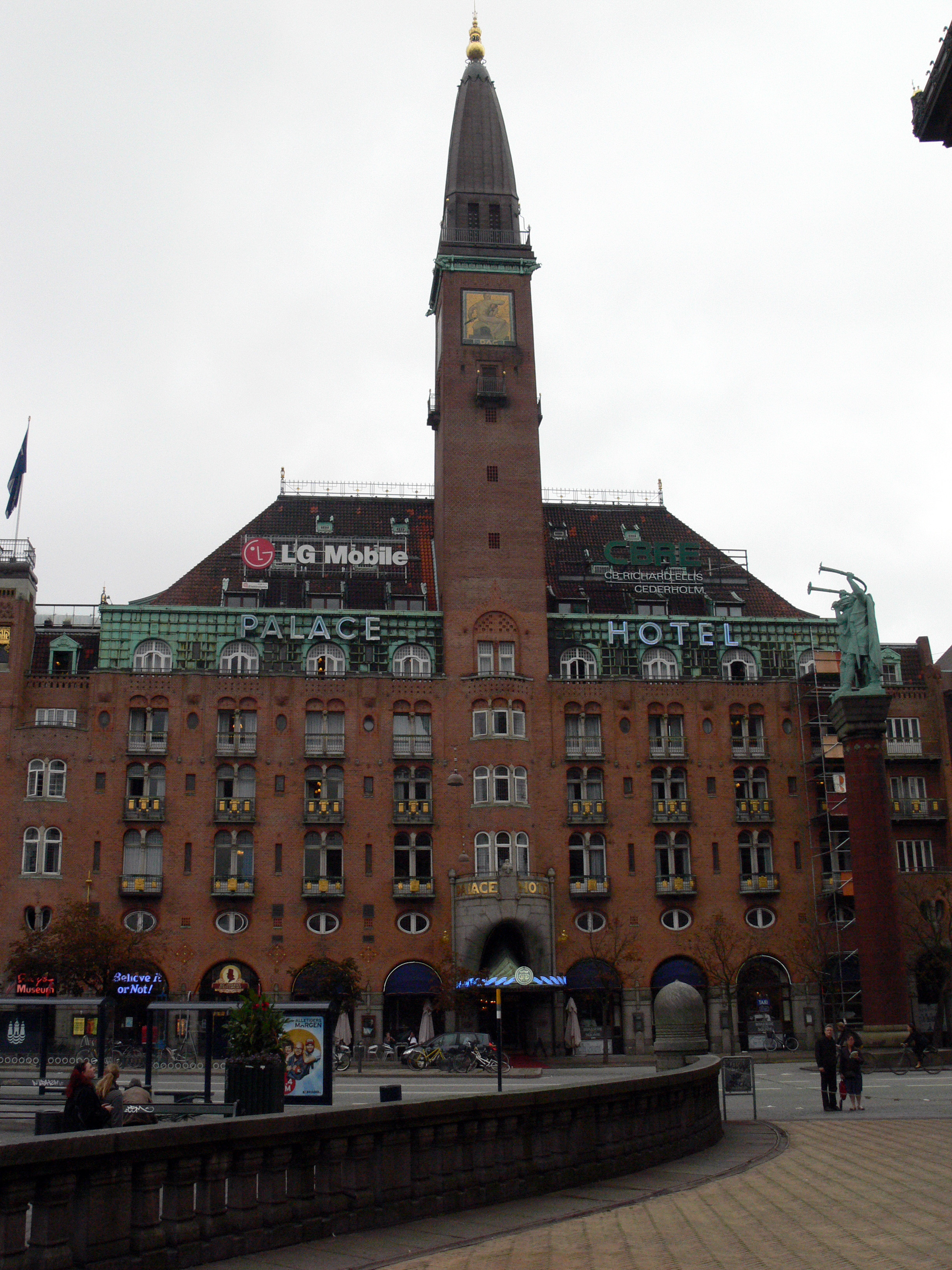
Palace Hotel, Copenhagen (1910)

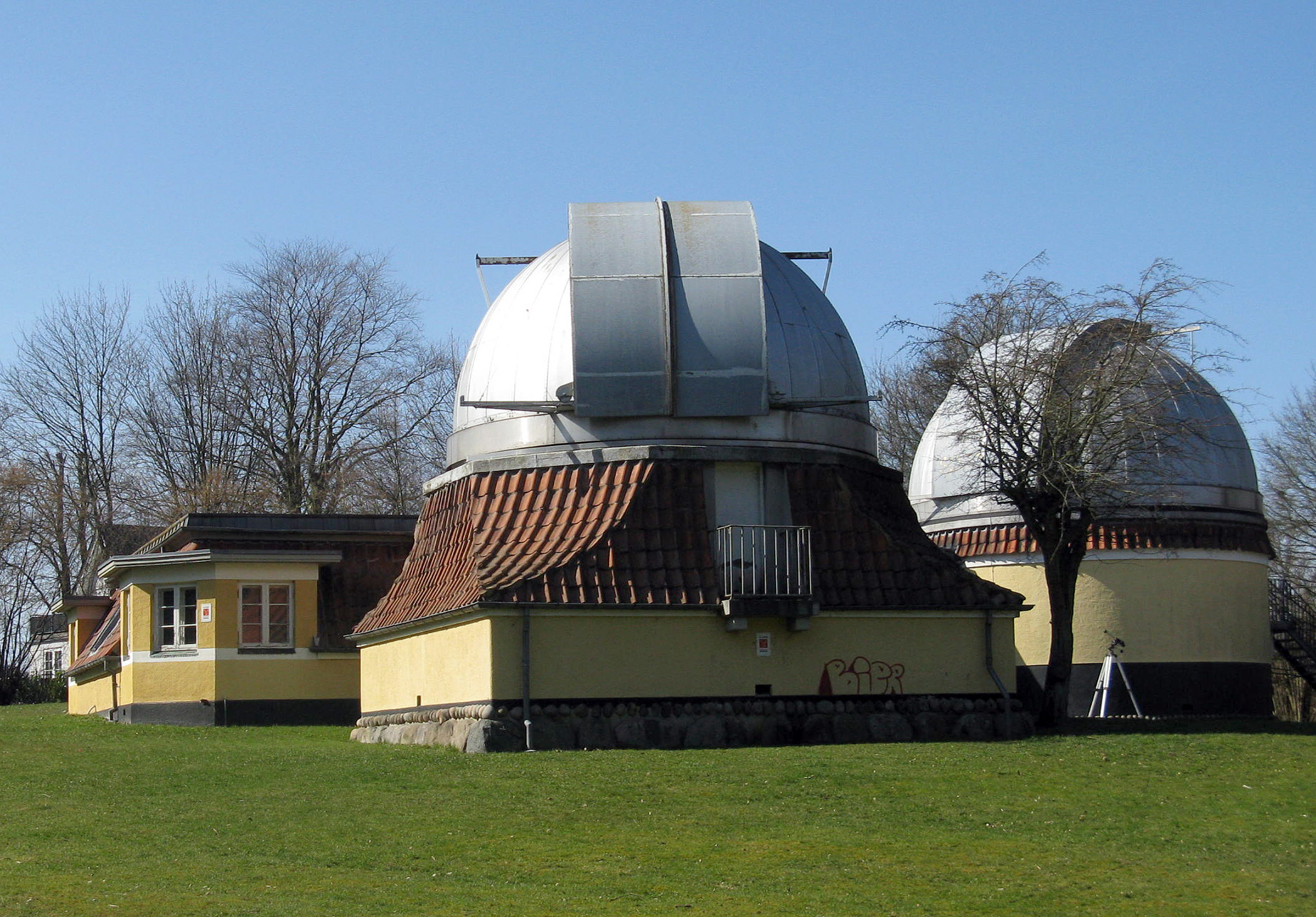
Ole Rømer Observatory, Århus (1911)

== Awards and distinctions ==
- 1909 Eckersberg Medal
- 1923 Knight of the Order of Danneborg
- 1923 Officer of the Order of the Polar Star
- 1924 Officer of the Order of Polonia Restituta
- 1925 Dannebrogordenens Hæderstegn
- 1925 Knight's Cross of the Légion d'honneur
- 1927 Honorary member of Akademisk Arkitektforening

== See also ==
- Architecture of Denmark

Cultural offices
Preceded by Joakim Skovgaard	Director of the Royal Danish Academy of Fine Arts; 1925	Succeeded by Einar Utzon-Frank
