= Savoy Hotel, Copenhagen =

Hotel in Copenhagen

Savoy Hotel Copenhagen
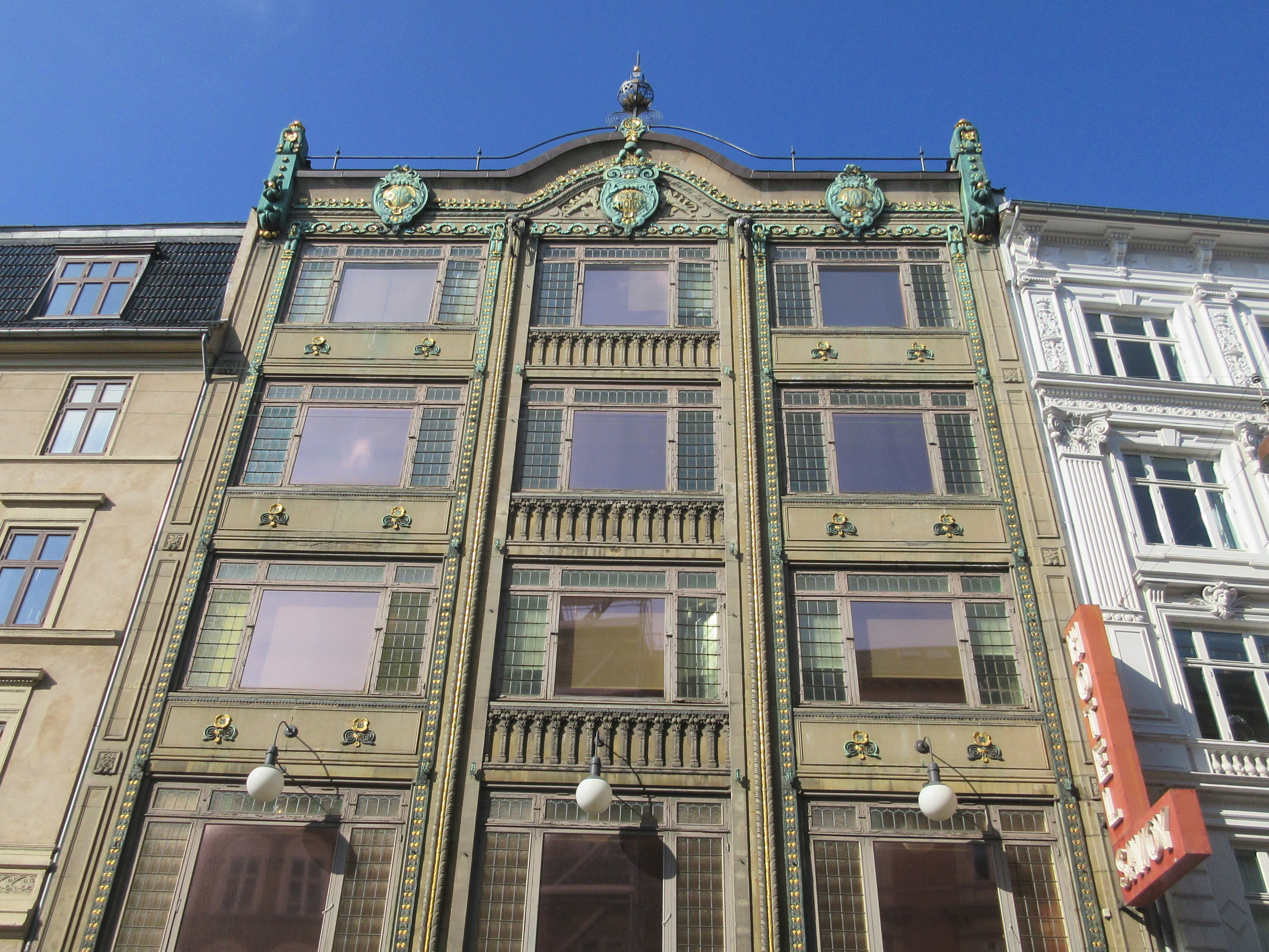
- Interactive map of the Savoy Hotel Copenhagen area

General information
- Location: Copenhagen, Denmark
- Coordinates: 55°40′21.36″N 12°33′22.68″E
- Opening: 1906; 120 years ago
- Owner: Dreyers Fond (building)

Design and construction
- Architect: Anton Rosen

Other information
- Number of rooms: 66

Savoy Hotel Copenhagen is a 66-room, privately run hotel located at Vesterbrogade 34 in the Vesterbro district of Copenhagen, Denmark. The hotel is based in the rear wing of the Løvenborg Building, Denmark's first example of Art Nouveau.

The building was listed on the Danish registry of protected buildings and places in 1885. It is owned by Dreyers Fond,

== History ==
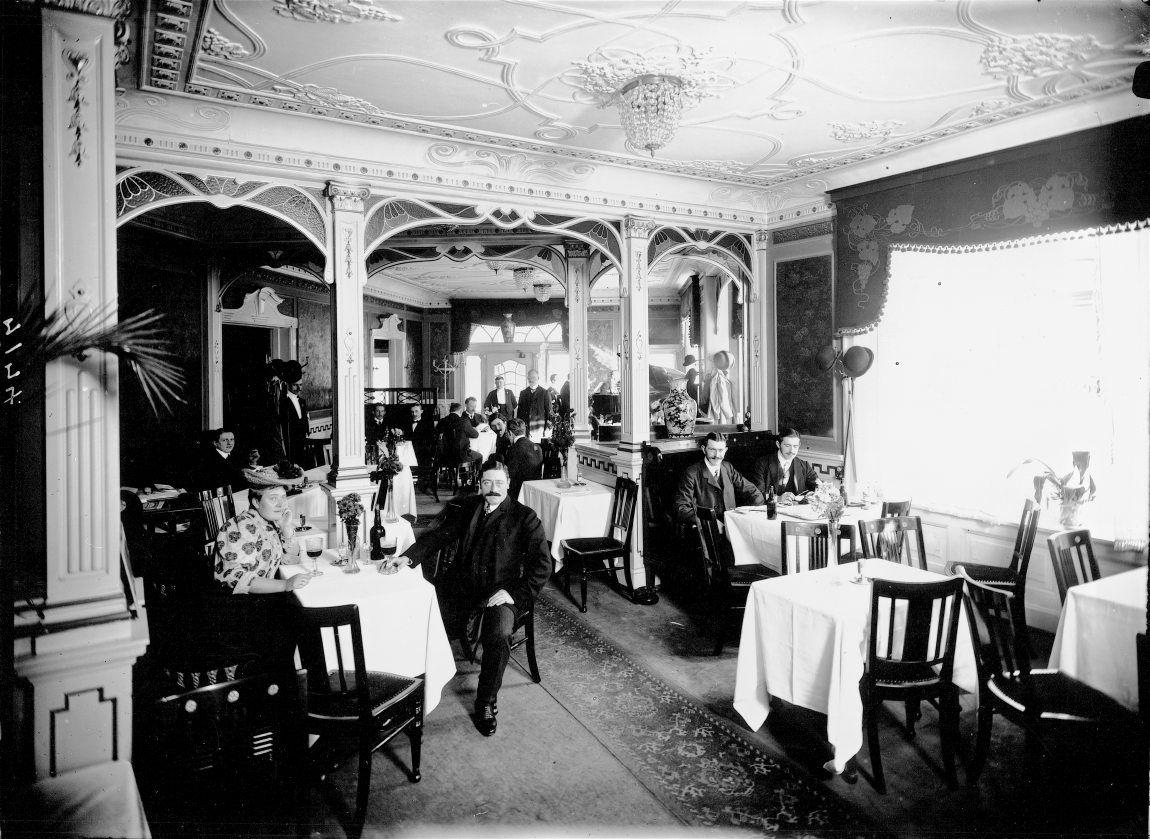
Hotel Savoy photographed by Peter Elfelt in 1907

The building was constructed for master joiner Carl Kaas-Rasmussen. In 1906, he demolished the existing buildings at the site. They included a four-storey residential building from 1861. The new building was completed the following year with the assistance of the architect Anton Rosen. It originally contained a cinema and a shop in the ground floor, commercial space in the middle floors, a residential apartment on the fourth floor and a seamstress in the attic.

The building was acquired by the Bygningsbevaringsfonden in 1995. It was subsequently restored and refurbished with the assistance of Erik Møller Arkitekter. It received the Europa Nostra Award in 2003.

The building has later been acquired by the Margot and Thorvald Dreyer Foundation.

== Architecture ==
The building was in several ways a novelty at the time of its construction. It is the first example of the Art Nouveau style in Denmark, Rosen being its main proponent in the country. The facade is richly decorated. Not part of the supporting structure, it is the first example of a curtain wall in Denmark. Løvenborg also features the first elevator in Denmark, still fully functioning. The building was listed in 1985.

== Gallery ==
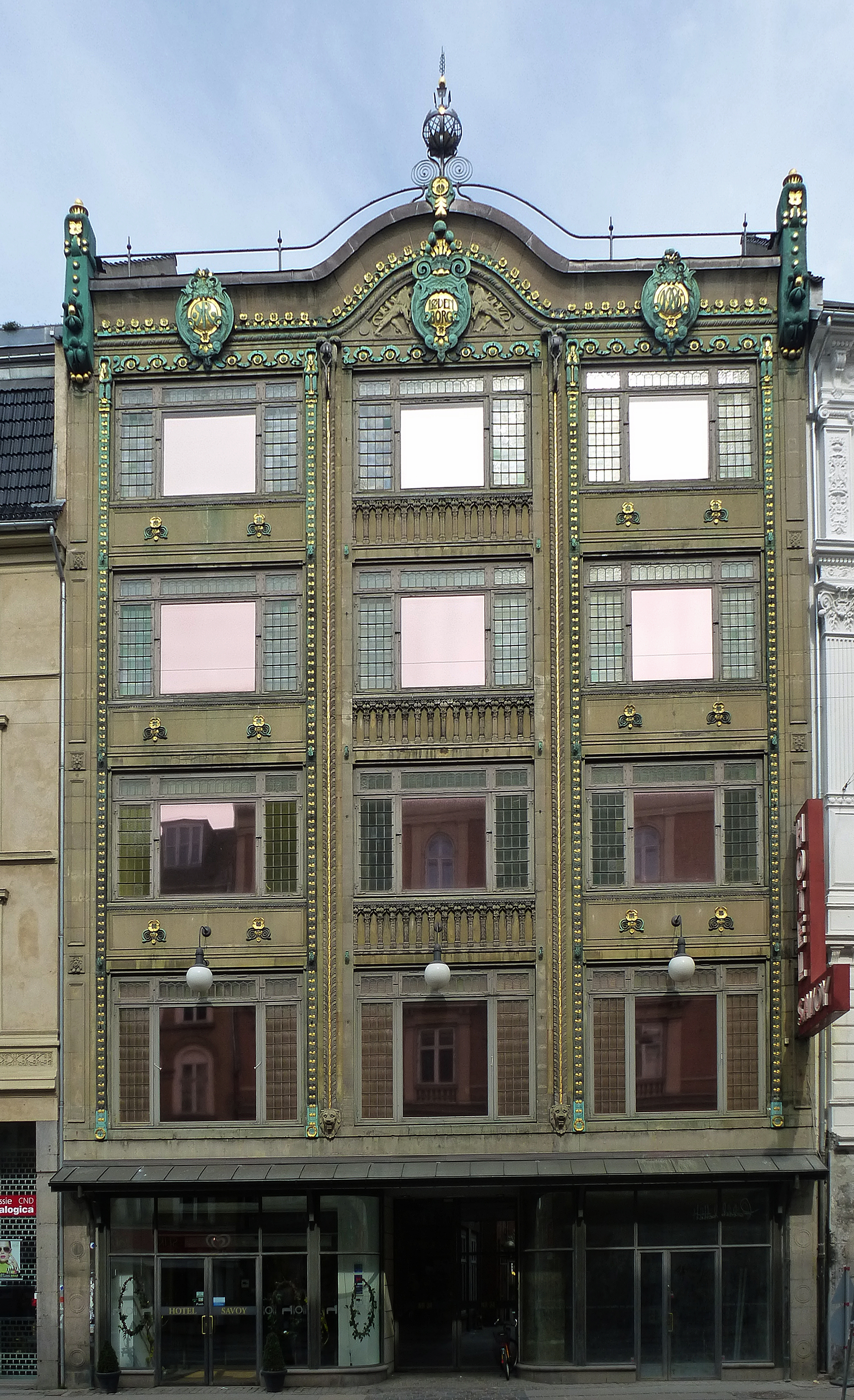
Løvenborg.

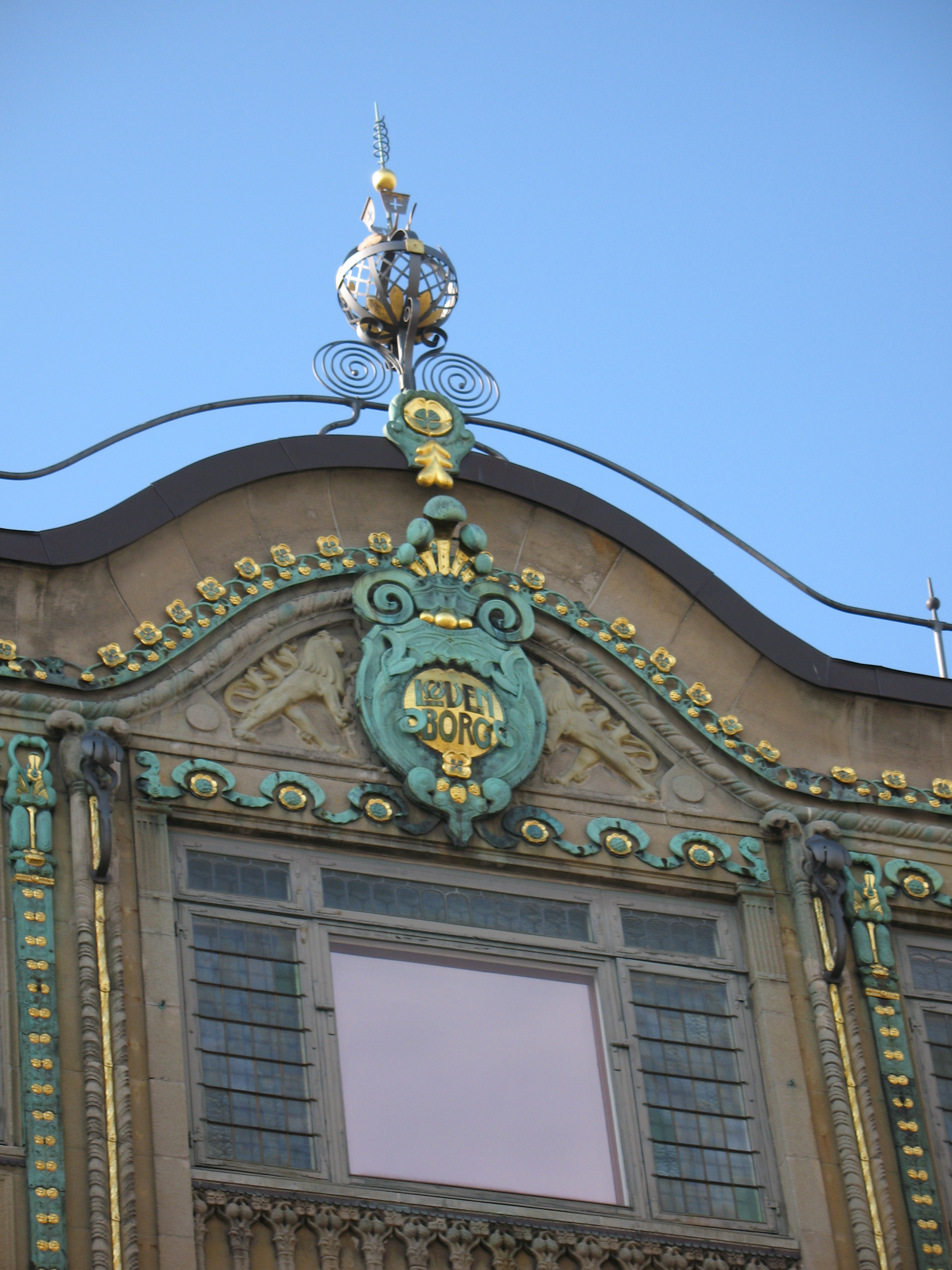
Detail from Løvenborg's facade.

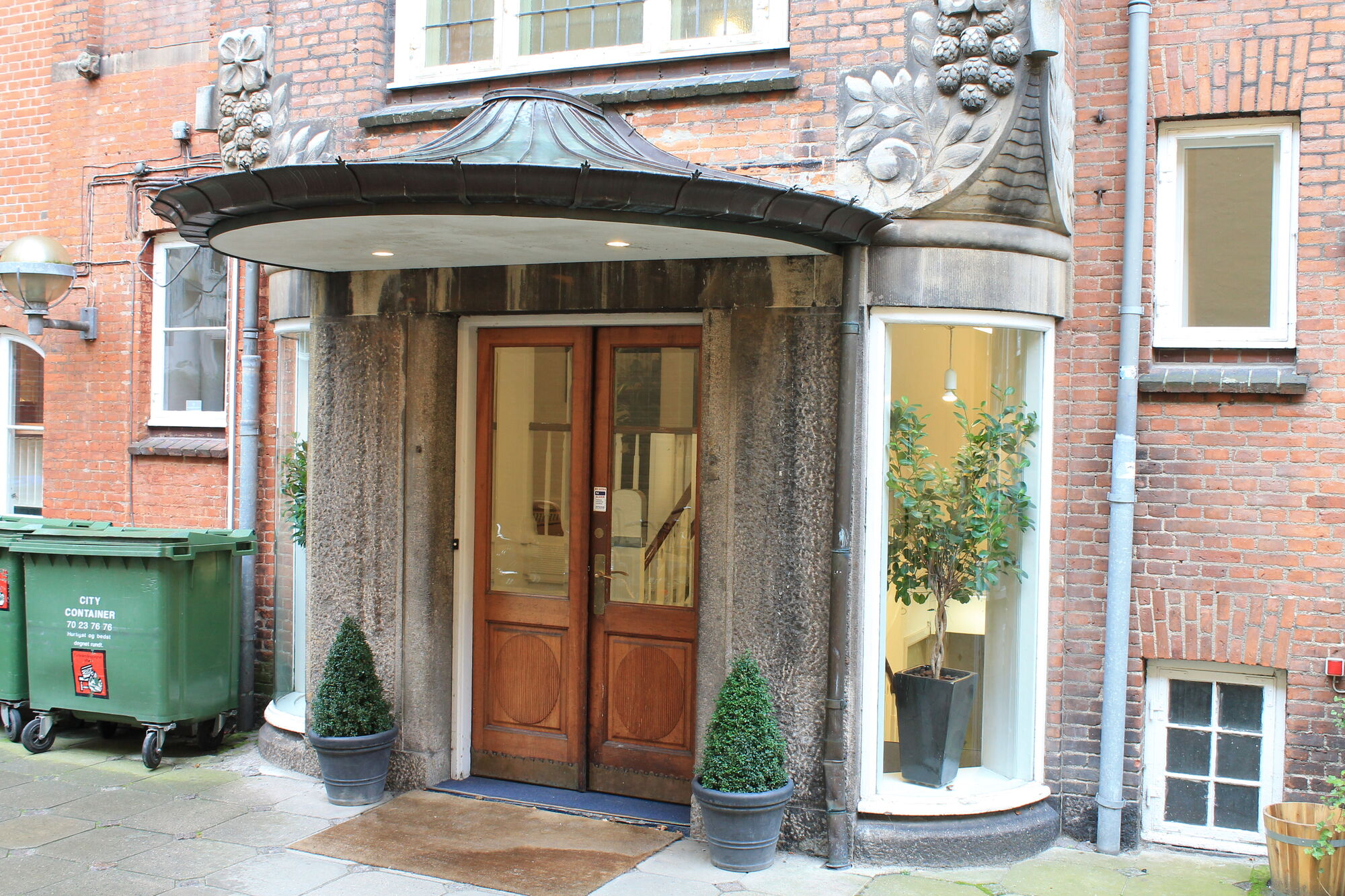
The hotel entrance in the courtyard.

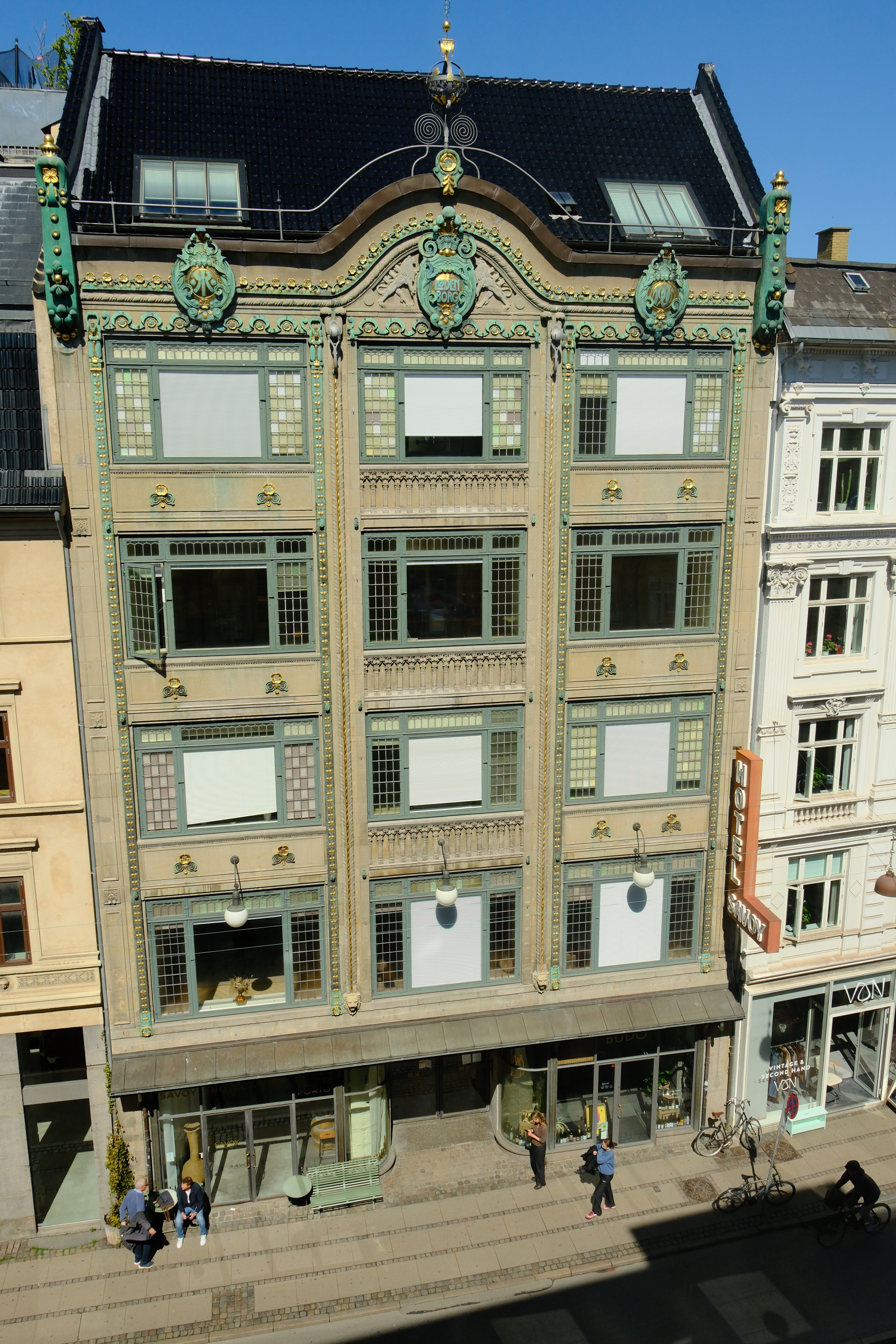
Savoy Hotel Facade

== Hotel Savoy ==
The 66-room Hotel Savoy is operated by a separate company in the rear wing of the building. As of 1 May 2019, Christian Oxlund sold it to Karim Nielsen.
