= Kirsten Olesen =

Danish actress (born 1949)

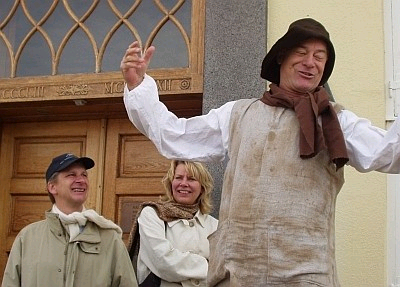
Kirsten Olesen (centre) together with Henrik Koefoed (left) and Niels Andersen

Kirsten Olesen (born 1949) is a Danish actress who since 1979 has been with Copenhagen's Royal Danish Theatre. In Denmark, she is known above all for taking the part of Agnes, a housemaid, in the popular television series Matador (1978–1982). Internationally, she has starred in the title role of Lars von Trier's Medea (1988).

== Biography ==
Born on 10 May 1949 in Aarhus, Kirsten Olesen was the daughter of Jens Oscar Olesen (1912–1987) and Sigrid Marie Lange (1912–1999). After matriculating from Horsens Statsskole, she attended the drama school at Odense Teater where she completed her studies in 1971. After a period with the theatre group Banden in Odense, she moved to Copenhagen where she acted in various theatres, gaining recognition as Alma in Tennessee Williams' Summer and Smoke at the Hvidovre Teater in 1976 and as Caroline Mathilde in Sven Holm's Struense var her at Folketeatret the following year. But it was in 1977 at Strøghus Teatret that she became widely acclaimed for her performance of the title role in Euripides's Electra.

In 1979, for playing Kirsten in Bille August's 1978 film Honningmåne (In My Life), she received a Bodil for best leading actress.

While she became attached to Copenhagen's Royal Theatre in 1979, she also appeared in many films and television series, especially as Agnes in Matador playing the modest role of a housemaid which, given her talented performances, was subsequently enhanced by the author Lise Nørgaard. Her stage performances have varied from classical Greek tragedies to Shakespeare, Schiller, Ibsen, Strindberg and Eugene O'Neill.

More recently, she has been acclaimed for her role as Veronika in the Danish TV series Arvingerne or The Legacy (2014).

== Awards and honours ==
In addition to her Bodil in 1979, she was honoured as a Knight of the Dannebrog in 1988, as a Knight 1st Class in 1997, and as a Commander in 2007. She has also received the Robert Award for the Best Actress in a Supporting Role for her performance the 1985 film Elise. In 1991, she was awarded the Danish Teaterpokalen.
