= 60th Bodil Awards =

2007 Danish film awards ceremony

- Date: 25 February 2007
- Site: Imperial Cinema, Copenhagen
- Hosted by: Casper Christensen and Mia Lyhne

Highlights
- Best Film: A Soap
- Best Actor: Nicolas Bro; Offscreen
- Best Actress: Trine Dyrholm; A Soap
- Most awards: A Soap (2)

The 60th Bodil Awards were held on 25 February 2007 in Imperial Cinema in Copenhagen, Denmark, honouring the best national and foreign films of 2006. A Soap won the award for Best Danish Film.

== Winners ==
=== Best Danish Film ===
- A Soap
  - We Shall Overcome
  - After the Wedding
  - Life Hits
  - Prague

=== Best Actor in a Leading Role ===
- Nicolas Bro – Offscreen
  - David Dencik – A Soap
  - Rolf Lassgård – After the Wedding
  - Mads Mikkelsen – Prague
  - Janus Dissing Rathke – We Shall Overcome

=== Best Actress in a Leading Role ===
- Trine Dyrholm – A Soap
  - Sidse Babett Knudsen – After the Wedding
  - Lene Maria Christensen – Fidibus
  - Stine Stengade – Prague
  - Laura Christensen, Stephanie Leon and Julie Ølgaard – Råzone

=== Best Actor in a Supporting Role ===
Bent Mejding – Drømmen

- Fridrik Thor Fridrikson – Direktøren for det hele
- Jens Jørn Spottag – Drømmen

=== Best Actress in a Supporting Role ===
- Stine Fischer Christensen – After the Wedding
  - Mette Riber Christoffersen – Råzone
  - Bodil Jørgensen – Der var engang en dreng
  - Sofie Stougaard – Lotto
  - Mia Lyhne – Direktøren for det hele

=== Best American Film ===
- Babel
  - A Prairie Home Companion
  - Capote'
  - The Departed
  - Sideways

=== Best Non-American Film ===
- The Lives of Others
  - L'Enfant
  - Caché
  - The Queen
  - Volver

=== Best Documentary ===
- Gasolin – Anders Østergård
  - Enemies of Happiness – Eva Muldvad, Simone Aaberg Kærn
  - Smiling in a War Zone – Simone Aaberg Kærn and Magnus Bejmar

=== Best Cinematography ===
- Jørgen Johansson – Prague

=== Honorary Award ===
- Helle Virkner

== See also ==
- 2007 Robert Awards
