= Joy-Maria Frederiksen =

Danish actress (born 1964)

Joy-Maria Frederiksen (born 1964) is a Danish actress, educated from Danish National School of Theatre and Contemporary Dance. Her television appearances include Jeg ville ønske for dig, TAXA, Pas på mor, Hvide løgne, Better Times (Krøniken) og The Killing (Forbrydelsen).

== Personal life ==
Since 1992, she has been married to actor Niels Olsen. Together, they have a daughter.

== Filmography ==
- De nøgne træer – (1991)
- Roser & persille – (1993)
- Royal blues – (1997)
- Baby Doom – (1998)
- Mistænkt – (2001)
- Kuren – (2001)
- En kort en lang – (2001)
- Min søsters børn i sneen – (2002)
- En som Hodder – (2003)
- Helligtrekongersaften – (2004)
- Drømmen – (2006)
- Vikaren - (2007)
- Kapgang - (2014)

=== TV appearances ===
| TV-series | Time | Notes |
|---|---|---|
| Parløb | 1990-1992 | Episode 5 |
| Jeg ville ønske for dig | 1995 | Episoderne 1, 2, 3, 4, 5, 6, 7, 8 |
| TAXA | 1997-1999 | Episode 10 |
| Pas på mor | 1998 | Episoderne 1, 3, 5, 6, 10 |
| Hvide Løgne | 1998-2001 | |
| Krøniken | 2003-2006 | Episoderne 12, 14, 20 |
| Forbrydelsen | 2007-2008 | Episoderne 4, 5, 16 |
| Borgen | 2010-2013 | Episode 20 |
