= Else-Marie Hansen =

Danish actress and operetta singer

Else-Marie Juul Hansen (19 October 1904, Copenhagen — 12 August 2003, Copenhagen) was a Danish actress and soprano operetta singer. Initially a dancer, she made her operetta debut in No, No, Nanette at Fønix-Teatret, Frederiksberg, in 1927. From the 1930s to the 1950s, she played leading operetta roles in various Copenhagen theatres, frequently performing with Hans Kurt Jensen. In addition to her many film roles, Hansen is remembered for playing Oda Holm in the popular Danish television series Matador (1978–81).

== Early life and education ==
Born on 19 October 1904 in Copenhagen, Else-Marie Juul Hansen was the daughter of the prosperous shoemaker Hans Frederik Hansen (1875–1946) and his wife Maren Jensigne née Nielsen (1875–1951). The family's only child, she was brought up in a well-established bourgeois home in the city's Nørrebro district. She attended a private school and from the age of five took dancing lessons under Agnes Nyrop Christensen which led to her performing as a child at Tivoli's Pantomime Theatre where she eventually danced as Columbine. She later attended drama courses in London and Stratford-on-Avon.

== Career ==
In 1927, Hansen made a sensational debut at Fenix Teatret in Frederiksberg performing in the operetta No, No, Naneete. She went on to perform leading operetta roles in Copenhagen and the Danish provinces as well as in Norway and Sweden. These included The Merry Widow with Erling Schroeder at the Frederiksberg Theatre. From 1938, together with Hans Kurt at Nørrebros Theater, she became Denmark's leading operetta actress performing in a considerable number of popular attractions including Balalaika, Me and My Girl and The Gypsy Baron. Together with Hans Kurt, she performed in The Merry Widow about a thousand times at Det Nye Teater where she become known for her delivery of the Vilja Song.

In 1948, she performed Mimi in La Bohême at the Odense Teater. Her final stage performance was in 1949 where she once again appeared with Hans Kurt in Oklahoma.

Else-Marie Juul Hansen died in Copenhagen on 12 August 2003.
