= Paul Hammerich =

Danish journalist and writer

Paul Hammerich (12 June 1927 – 16 April 1992) was a Danish journalist and writer.

Hammerich was one of the writers behind the successful Danish TV-series, Matador, which is considered one of the greatest Danish TV productions of all time.

He was married three times; from 1982 to his death with actress Malene Schwartz.
