= Bent Mejding =

Danish actor, stage director and theatre manager (1937–2024)

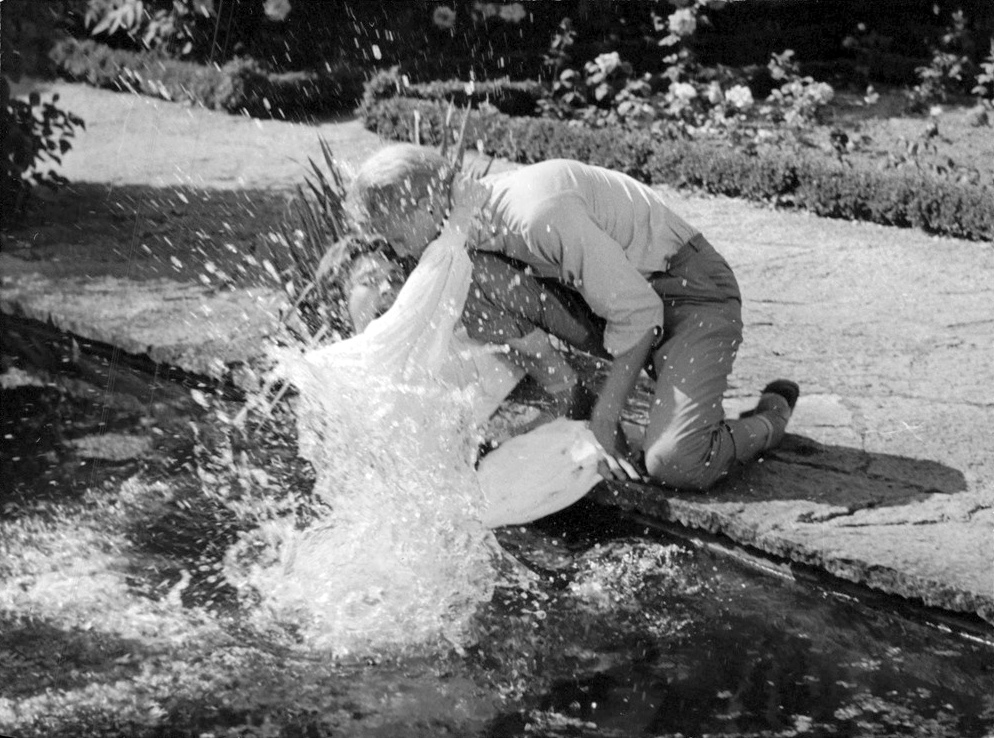
- Bent Mejding with Helle Virkner in a film scene 1958
- Born: 14 January 1937; Svendborg, Denmark
- Died: 12 November 2024 (aged 87)
- Occupation: Actor
- Years active: 1957–2024
- Spouses: Susanne Beathe Rosenkrantz-Theil (m. 1961, divorced) Susse Wold (m. 1983)
- Children: 2

Bent Mejding (14 January 1937 – 12 November 2024) was a Danish actor, stage director, and theatre manager. He won a Danish Film Academy Award in 1985 and 2007. He was married to actress Susse Wold.

== Life and career ==
Mejding had his debut at Folketeatret in Copenhagen, and later appeared in several productions at Det Ny Teater up through the 1960s. In 1961, he founded Ungdommens Teater which from 1964 was based at Frederiksberg-Scenen. From 1992 until 1997, together with Niels-Bo Valbro, he managed Det Ny Teater which reopened after a major refurbishment in 1994.

Mejding died from severe pneumonia on 12 November 2024, at the age of 87.

== Filmography ==
=== Film ===
Year	Title	Role	Notes
1961	Reptilicus	Svend Viltorft	
1961	The Musketeers'	Tange	
1962	Lykkens musikanter	Rolf Dagerman	
1976	The Olsen Gang Sees Red	Kapelmester	
1984	Twist and Shout (Tro, håb og kærlighed	Erik's father	
2000	Italian for Beginners	Reverend Wredmann	
2000	Flickering Lights		
2004	Brothers	Henning	Nominated—Bodil Award for Best Actor in a Supporting Role
2008	We Shall Overcome (Drømmen)	Headmaster Lindum-Svendsen	Bodil Award for Best Actor in a Supporting Role
2012	A Royal Affair	J. H. E. von Bernstorff	

=== Television ===
Year	Title	Role	Notes
1978–1982	Matador	Jørgen Varnæs	
1992	Gøngehøvdingen		
2000	Edderkoppen		
2003	Rejseholdet		2 episodes
2008	The Killing	Incumbent mayor Poul Bremer	
2014	1864	Baron Severin	
