= Elin Reimer =

Danish actress (1928–2022)

Elin Reimer-Nielsen (7 March 1928, Frederiksberg — 17 September 2022, Virum) was a Danish actress who appeared in over 60 productions on stage, film and television. She is remembered above all for the role of Laura, a kitchen maid, in the popular Danish television series Matador (1978–82). In 1984, she was honoured with the Order of the Dannebrog.

== Early life ==
Born in the Frederiksberg district of Copenhagen on 7 March 1928, Elin Reimer-Nielsen was the daughter of the vocational school teacher Egon Rudolf Reimer-Nielsen (1901–72) and his wife Edith Christine née Mortensen (1903–78). When she was 18, she studied drama at Frederiksbergs Teater's student school (1946–48).

== Career ==
As a child. Reimer had performed in the 1930s in children's productions and on radio presentations. In 1941, she made her official debut at Bellahoj Friluftsteater as the princess in Svinedrangem. On completing her drama studies, she performed for the Aalborg Teater and in 1954 moved to the Aarhus Teater. Here she was engaged for 14 seasons where she was successful in both classical and modern productions. Thanks to her good singing voice she also performed in operettas. Traditional roles included Dorine in Molière's Tartuffe and Olivia in Shakespeare's Twelfth Night. In 1963, she joined an experimental group in Aarhus under Preben Harris and moved with him to the Gladsaxe Teater near Copenhagen in 1967 and to Copenhagen's Folketeatret in 1973 after he had been appointed director. There she performed the challenging title role of a working-class woman in Kent Andersson's Agnes.

Above all, she is remembered for performing the role of Laura in the popular Danish television series Matador. Reimer also performed in reviews and took a number of minor roles in the Krummerne film series.

Elin Reimer died on 17 September 2022 in Virum, aged 94.
