= We Shall Overcome (film) =

- Film release poster
- Drømmen
- Directed by: Niels Arden Oplev
- Screenplay by: Niels Arden Oplev; Steen Bille
- Produced by: Sisse Graum Jørgensen
- Starring: Bent Mejding; Janus Dissing Rathke; Anders W. Berthelsen; Jens Jørn Spottag
- Cinematography: Lars Vestergaard
- Edited by: Søren B. Ebbe
- Music by: Jacob Groth
- Production company: Zentropa Entertainments11
- Distributed by: Nordisk Film Biografdistribution
- Release date: 24 March 2006 (Denmark)
- Running time: 109 minutes
- Country: Denmark
- Language: Danish

Drømmen (Danish "The Dream", English: We Shall Overcome) is a 2006 Danish film based on a true story about a young boy's crusade against a dictatorial headmaster of the "old school", in 1969 Denmark.

The film is directed by Danish screenwriter and film director Niels Arden Oplev and stars Bent Mejding and Anders W. Berthelsen. It won sixteen awards in 2006 and 2007.

== Synopsis ==
The story opens in the Danish countryside of 1969. Denmark and the rest of the world are changing rapidly but Lindum-Svendsen, the headmaster of the rural school, hasn't noticed.

Frits is a young boy who spends his summer holidays watching the family's first television, and is influenced by the American civil rights movement. The sermons and speeches of Martin Luther King Jr., who was assassinated in 1968, coupled with his own dreams of a better life, have given Frits courage and a desire for rebellion. The dictatorial Lindum-Svendsen steps over the line while punishing Frits, drawing the ire of youthful new teacher Freddie Svale, which encourages Frits to take up battle against the headmaster.

== Cast ==
- Bent Mejding as headmaster Lindum-Svendsen
- Janus Dissing Rathke as Frits Johansen
- Anders W. Berthelsen as Freddie Svale
- Jens Jørn Spottag as Peder, Frits' father
- Peter Hesse Overgaard as Erling
- Anne-Grethe Bjarup Riis as Stine, Frits' mother
- Gyrd Løfqvist as Frits' grandfather
- Elin Reimer as Frits' grandmother
- Steen Stig Lommer as teacher Olsen
- Kurt Ravn as school doctor
- Peter Schrøder as sexton
- Sarah Juel Werner as Iben
- Daniel Ørum as Troels
- Lasse Borg as Søren
- Joy-Maria Frederiksen as Iben's mother

== Accolades ==
The film has won sixteen awards in 2006 and 2007.

Organization	Category	Recipient(s) and nominee(s)	Result
Berlin International Film Festival	Crystal Bear – Best Feature Film	Niels Arden Oplev	Won
Bodil Awards	Best Supporting Actor	Bent Mejding	Won
Bodil Awards	Best Actor	Janus Dissing Rathke	Nominated
Bodil Awards	Best Film	Niels Arden Oplev	Nominated
Bodil Awards	Best Supporting Actor	Jens Jørn Spottag	Nominated
Carrousel international du film de Rimouski	Camério – Best Actor	Janus Dissing Rathke	Won
Carrousel international du film de Rimouski	Camério – Best Film	Niels Arden Oplev	Won
Chicago International Children's Film Festival	Children's Jury Award – Live-Action Feature Film or Video	Niels Arden Oplev	Won
Chicago International Children's Film Festival	Adult's Jury Award – Live-Action Feature Film or Video	Niels Arden Oplev	Won 2nd place
Cinekid Festival	Cinekid Film Award	Niels Arden Oplev	Won
Robert Awards	Best Costume Design	Manon Rasmussen	Won
Robert Awards	Best Director	Niels Arden Oplev	Won
Robert Awards	Best Editor	Søren B. Ebbe	Won
Robert Awards	Best Film	Niels Arden Oplev (director); Sisse Graum Jørgensen (producer)	Won
Robert Awards	Best Screenplay, Original	Niels Arden Oplev; Steen Bille	Won
Robert Awards	Best Supporting Actor	Bent Mejding	Won
Robert Awards	Best Actor	Janus Dissing Rathke	Nominated
Robert Awards	Best Actress	Anne-Grethe Bjarup Riis	Nominated
Robert Awards	Best Cinematography	Lars Vestergaard	Nominated
Robert Awards	Best Make-Up	Kirsten Zäschke; Suzanne Jansen	Nominated
Robert Awards	Best Original Score	Jacob Groth	Nominated
Robert Awards	Best Production Design	Søren Skjær	Nominated
Robert Awards	Best Sound	Peter Schultz	Nominated
Robert Awards	Best Special Effects/Lighting	Morten Jacobsen; Hans Peter Ludvigsen	Nominated
Robert Awards	Best Supporting Actor	Anders W. Berthelsen	Nominated
Robert Awards	Best Supporting Actress	Sarah Juel Werner	Nominated
Zlín Film Festival	Audience Award – Best Feature Film	Niels Arden Oplev	Won
Zlín Film Festival	Don Quixote Award	Niels Arden Oplev	Won
Zlín Film Festival	Golden Slipper – Best Feature Film for Youth	Niels Arden Oplev	Won
