= Matador (Danish TV series) =

Danish TV series (1978–1982)

- Genre: Historical
- Created by: Lise Nørgaard
- Written by: Lise Nørgaard; Erik Balling; Paul Hammerich; Jens Louis Petersen; Karen Smith
- Directed by: Erik Balling
- Starring: Jørgen Buckhøj; Ghita Nørby; Holger Juul Hansen; Malene Schwartz; Buster Larsen; Helle Virkner; Bent Mejding; Jesper Langberg
- Narrated by: Ole Andreasen
- Theme music composer: Bent Fabricius-Bjerre
- Country of origin: Denmark
- Original language: Danish
- No. of seasons: 4
- No. of episodes: 24

Production
- Running time: 41–86 minutes per episode
- Production company: Nordisk Film

Original release
- Network: Danmarks Radio
- Release: 11 November 1978 – 2 January 1982

Matador is a Danish TV series produced and aired between 1978 and 1982. It is set in the fictional Danish town of Korsbæk (a portmanteau of Korsør and Holbæk) between 1929 and 1947. It follows the lives of a range of characters from across the social spectrum, focusing specifically on the rivalry between the families of two businessmen: banker Hans Christian Varnæs, an established local worthy, and Mads (Andersen-)Skjern, who arrives in town as a travelling salesman as the series opens, and builds up a large business. The name Matador was taken from the localised edition of the boardgame Monopoly, also the series' tentative English title. In addition, in contemporary Danish a "matador" is often used to describe a business tycoon, in the series referring to the character of Mads Skjern and his craftiness as a self-made entrepreneur.

Directed by Danish film-maker Erik Balling, Matador was the idea of author Lise Nørgaard, who wrote the bulk of the episodes, along with Karen Smith, Jens Louis Petersen, and Paul Hammerich. The series is one of the most well-known and popular examples of Danish television and represents a then peak of longtime development of Danish TV drama by the public service channel Danmarks Radio.

The series has become part of the modern self-understanding of Danes, partly because of its successful mix of melodrama and a distinct warm Danish humour in the depiction of characters, which were portrayed by a wide range of the most popular Danish actors at the time; but also not least because of its accurate portrayal of a turbulent Denmark from around the start of the Great Depression and through Nazi Germany's occupation of Denmark in World War II.

== Production ==
Coined by series writer Paul Hammerich, the name of the town Korsbæk is a portmanteau of the two Danish towns Korsør and Holbæk. Series creator Lise Nørgaard based much of the provincial feel of Korsbæk on her experiences with the town of Skælskør. Even though Korsbæk was originally a fictional town, it has been built 1:1 in the Danish amusement park Dyrehavsbakken.

Matador is also the name of the localized Danish version of the board game Monopoly. According to the series' creator, Lise Nørgaard, this board game served as inspiration for the title of the series. A group of characters play the board game in episode 11, which is set in 1936, the same year the boardgame Monopoly/Matador was introduced in Denmark.

Swedish costume designer Ulla-Britt Söderlund was responsible for the series' period dress, and oversaw its representation of the period's many changes in fashion. The distinctive and, in Denmark, celebrated theme tune of the series was composed by Bent Fabricius-Bjerre.

Matador was shot entirely on 16mm film, as opposed to video. Prior to its release on DVD in 2001, all the master negatives and magnetic sound tapes had to undergo a thorough physical and digital restoration. In 2017 it was restored to 1080p High-definition television prior to the series' sixth rerun on Danish TV.

== Reception ==
Matador originally aired on DR between November 1978 and January 1982 and has enjoyed repeated successful reruns in 1984-85, 1989–90, 1997–98, 2006–07, 2012–13, 2017–18 and most recently 2020, for the latter newly restored to High Definition. Individual episodes figure prominently in Denmark's top TV viewing figures of all time, led by episode 9's showing during the series' first rerun on 10 February 1985 with an estimated 3,641,000 viewers, followed closely by 3,516,000 viewers watching the series finale during its original run on 2 January 1982; this in a country of some 5 million people at the time.

Additionally, the series has been released on VHS and in 2001 on region 2 DVD. This first edition of 12 separate DVDs with two episodes each has been one of the most sold in the country's history and surpassed a total of 1 million copies sold in 2005. A second 2006 13-DVD box set included English subtitles for a wider audience, with various DVD editions surpassing 3.6 million copies sold by 2013. The series was widely popular in neighbouring Norway, Sweden, and Germany, and it has been broadcast in more than 20 countries worldwide, one of which was Australia, here also widely popular when broadcast on Australian SBS TV in Danish with English subtitles. Queen Mary of Denmark, born in Tasmania, stated in a TV interview on Australian TV in 2004, that she watched Matador whilst learning Danish.

== List and synopsis of Matador episodes ==
(The English episode titles are taken from the English subtitle track on the 2006 Region 0 DVD collection. Many of the original episode titles are based on Danish puns and expressions.)

=== Season 1 (1978) ===
No. overall	No. in season	Title	Written by	Original release date	Length (minutes)
1	1	"The Traveler: 1929" (Danish: Den Rejsende: 1929)	Lise Nørgaard	11 November 1978	45 minutes
Traveling drapery salesman Mads Andersen-Skjern arrives in Korsbæk with his little boy Daniel and sees opportunities when faced with the inept draper Albert Arnesen and this small sleepy town where the old families define the pace and virtue. Receiving only haughty condescension from the upper-class, Mads finds local allies in the family of pig trader Oluf Larsen and his wife Kathrine, who has more money than meets the eye. Failing to secure a loan from local, third-generation banker Hans Christian Varnæs and his esteemed Korsbæk Bank, Mads borrows money both from his Jutland family and the Larsens, and he purchases a shop opposite "Damernes Magasin" (lit.: "the Ladies' Store"), Arnesen's store. Meanwhile, Hans Christian Varnæs' wife, the oversensitive Maude, throws lavish parties for the local socialites, including the 96-year-old Mrs. Fernando Møhge and her timid daughter Misse, the bombastic Colonel Hackel and his close friend, Doctor Louis Hansen, and Varnæs' playboy brother, Jørgen, who seeks a seat in the parliament.
2	2	"The Neighbor: 1929" (Danish: Genboen: 1929)	Lise Nørgaard and Jens Louis Petersen	18 November 1978	41 minutes
The town's bourgeoisie watch with judging and disapproving eyes as Mads Skern opens his new shop "Tøjhuset" (lit.: "The Clothing House" but also "Arsenal"), in direct competition with Arnesen's. Oluf Larsen's daughter, Ingeborg, starts as a clerk in his store, much to Mads' pleasure. Arnesen struggle with comprehending his new rival, while also battling issues with his very young and lively wife, Vicki, the daughter of Colonel Hackel, and her poodle Daisy, who finds an untimely intimate relationship in the middle of the main street with Oluf Larsen's less-than-pedigree mutt Kvik.
3	3	"Quarter Day: 1930" (Danish: Skiftedag: 1930)	Karen Smith	25 November 1978	50 minutes
Arnesen's store is losing money hand over fist, so when he learns that his manager, Mr. Schwann, has inherited a large sum, he persuades him to become his partner; the snobby Mr. Schwann gleefully throws his entire inheritance into Damernes Magasin, postponing the inevitable for a few months. Their apprentice, Arnold, on the other hand, quits and joins the enemy "over there" to a doubled salary and ditto respect. Mads marries Ingeborg and adopts Ellen. When the local Baroness finds out that Mads is considerably cheaper than Arnesen, she takes her business to Skjern, signaling that even the upper class begins to abandon Arnesen's old store.
4	4	"The Maiden Aunt: 1931" (Danish: Skyggetanten: 1931)	Lise Nørgaard	2 December 1978	55 minutes
Mads' business continues to thrive and he even begins issuing loans to the locals. His younger brother Kristen, a banker, arrives in Korsbæk to assist. Kristen is quickly smitten with Maude's sister Elisabeth, who otherwise lives in the shadow of her sister. They fall in love, but their liaison is impossible due to the rivalry of their respective families.
5	5	"One Man's Loss: 1932" (Danish: Den Enes Død: 1932 (Note: lit. 'One Man's Death', this from the Danish business expression "One man's death, another man's bread" (Danish: Den Enes Død, Den Andens Brød)))	Paul Hammerich	9 December 1978	60 minutes
Arnesen is in the shambles, and even Varnæs cannot aid him financially any further. He knows he is ruined. His wife Vicki returns gleeming with a fresh driver's license, but finds him dead. Rumors fly about Korsbæk of suicide, and Arnesen's is a total bankruptcy, leaving Schwann penniless and the shop's aging saleswoman Ms. Inger Jørgensen without a sense of direction.
6	6	"Deployment: 1932" (Danish: Opmarch: 1932)	Lise Nørgaard	16 December 1978	56 minutes
To the horror of the bourgeoisie, Vicki, now a young widow, sells the shop to Mads Andersen-Skjern and moves to Copenhagen, against her father's will. Jørgen Varnæs lands a nasty adultery scandal, gets divorced and is dismissed as the conservative party candidate for the parliament. The Varnæs family is shattered. Elisabeth adds salt by moving out of the Varnæs residence and into her own apartment. Replacing Damernes Magasin is a new bank, "Omegnsbanken" (lit.: "The Environs Bank"), with Mads Skjern as majority shareholder and Kristian Skjern as manager. Mads and Ingeborg have a son named Erik, and discard their middle name, Andersen, marking the Skjerns as the new dynasty in town.

=== Season 2 (1979) ===
No. overall	No. in season	Title	Written by	Original release date	Length (minutes)
7	1	"The Birthday: 1933" (Danish: Fødselsdagen: 1933)	Lise Nørgaard	17 November 1979	74 minutes
While Mads Skjern continues to expand his businesses, Hans Christian Varnæs battles a new dynamic force in the board of his bank, the state lawyer Viggo Skjold Hansen, who has obtained his shares and board seat from the spiralling Jørgen Varnæs. The whimpering Maude makes matters worse, and in frustration Hans Christian enters in an affair with his bank assistant Ms. Ulla Jacobsen. Mrs. Fernando Møhge and the entire town celebrates her 100th birthday, but there is a surprise. For years she has mixed up her own birth year with that of her late husband, and in actuality, she is only 90 years old. Once a telegram arrives from the King, congratulating her on her 100th birthday, there is even more ruckus in the Varnæs family, which holds the feast in her honor.
8	2	"Stranger in Town: 1934" (Danish: Komme fremmede: 1934)	Lise Nørgaard and Karen Smith	24 November 1979	77 minutes
Internationality lands in Korsbæk in the shape of famed modern painter, Professor Ernst Nyborg, former art teacher and romantic interest of Maude Varnæs. Also arriving to witness Nyborg's exhibit is Gitte Graae, Jørgen Varnæs' home-wrecking and increasingly expensive lady friend. Mads Skjern also has his eye on the arts, but with different intentions. In order to secure a building permit, he "greases the political wheels" by anonymously commissioning Nyborg to paint a portrait of the town Mayor.
9	3	"But What About the Dresser: 1935" (Danish: Hen til Kommoden: 1935 (Note: The original title stems from the expression (and 1936 revuesong Hen te' Kommoden og te'bavs igen) "Hen til kommoden og tilbage igen", appr. "Over to the dresser and back again", a sort of 'Back and Forth' expression."))	Paul Hammerich	1 December 1979	65 minutes
The Varnæsses' maid, Agnes Jensen, quits her job to marry railway employee and local communist, Lauritz "Red" Jensen, but to her dismay, Red quickly invites a German refugee, the poet Herbert Schmidt, to live with them in the spirit of solidarity. Mads, having secured the building permit under dubious circumstances involving the indebted municipal secretary Godtfred Lund, starts building a factory on a plot otherwise reserved for the memory of the Møhge family. This spurs the energetic Skjold Hansen to investigate, seeking to damage the Skjern business. During his investigations, Mr. Schwann, now a debt collector, provides Skjold Hansen with some interesting bits of information. Holger Jørgensen, former husband of Ingeborg Skjern and biological father of Ellen returns to town, now a member of the small Danish Nazi party. Varnæs continues his affair with Ms. Jacobsen.
10	4	"Nowadays: 1935" (Danish: I Disse Tider: 1935)	Lise Nørgaard	8 December 1979	65 minutes
Mads' building project is well under way, but Mrs. Møhge supported by Skjold Hansen continues to fight him. Skjold Hansen's daughter Iben arrives in town, having cancelled an upcoming wedding in Germany, and begins flirting with Kristen Skjern. Elisabeth Friis causes a furor, when openly supporting an abortion doctor, bringing her at odds with her sister and her sister's social circle. Ulla Jacobsen breaks off the affair with Hans Christian and quits her job, finding employment in Omegnsbanken with help from her cousin, Arnold Vinter. Agnes Jensen is pregnant and eagerly wants a baby carriage they cannot afford. Their resident refugee Herbert, who weekly has to show the police 100 kroner as proof of livelihood, an amount he is forced to borrow from Oluf Larsen every week, receives a lavish 75 kroner advance for an upcoming book. Agnes comes home and finds a baby carriage in their hallway, bought and paid for by Herbert using his advance.
11	5	"In a Pinch: 1936" (Danish: I klemme: 1936)	Jens Louis Petersen	15 December 1979	73 minutes
Agnes delivers a boy, while Vicki, widow of Arnesen, returns to Korsbæk as a traveling vaudeville actress and reconciles with her father, the Colonel. Via Oluf Larsen she meets Herbert Schmidt, who now lives with the Larsens. Hans Christian Varnæs learns that his mistress Ms. Jacobsen is pregnant from their affair. She wants an abortion, which he pays for in betrayal of his own morals. Mads Skjern also is in a pinch, when the corrupt municipal secretary Lund runs off with the town's treasury, leaving his helpless wife behind. It is revealed that Mads bribed him, and Mads is threatened with personal ruin. Mads decides to reward Ellen a horse for being a good student, simultaneously punishing the poor student Daniel, who had originally wished for a horse. Katrine Larsen foils Mads' plan by giving Daniel a horse of his own for "being a good and tender boy". While Daniel is happy, he had still desired to receive the gift from his father.
12	6	"For Better and For Worse: 1937" (Danish: I Lyst og Nød: 1937)	Lise Nørgaard	22 December 1979	82 minutes
Herbert Schmidt and Lauritz "Red" Jensen embark for Spain to fight the fascists in the Spanish Civil War, but Red changes his mind en route, while Herbert continues on. Elisabeth relays an offer from Hans Christian Varnæs to Kristen Skjern of a position at a bank in Jutland, but Kristen see it as a plot to separate him from his brother, Mads, who is still being hammered by Skjold Hansen's investigations. Kristen and Elisabeth quarrel, and Kristen reveals Varnæs' affair and subsequent abortion arrangement, an official secret in town. The rift between Kristen and Elisabeth is irreparable, and in spite, Kristen marries the eager Iben Skjold Hansen. While Elisabeth is shattered, Iben's father now drops all efforts to destroy Mads, due to their new family ties. Ms. Jørgensen returns to Korsbæk under dubious pretenses and finds work as a housekeeper for the Varnæsses. The troubled Ms. Jørgensen becomes a menace in the household, and after insulting the Varnæs house guests, she is reprimanded by Maude; but an angry Ms. Jørgensen reveals Maude's husband's adultery and abortion, and later attempts suicide. Maude confronts her husband, who admits his guilt, and a changed Maude leaves with Elisabeth on a long journey to Switzerland, in order to make some sense of it all.

=== Season 3 (1980–1981) ===
No. overall	No. in season	Title	Written by	Original release date	Length (minutes)
13	1	"A New Life: Autumn 1937 - Spring 1938" (Danish: Et Nyt Liv: Efterår 1937 - Forår 1938)	Lise Nørgaard	6 December 1980	84 minutes
Mads is back in business and expands on all fronts and moves his family to a large villa outside of Korsbæk. The Varnæs couple return from a trip to Paris, invigorated and with Maude pregnant. They host a party for people whom they met in Paris. During the party, Jørgen Varnæs reveals that he has suspended his licence to practice law to become an administrator for a large textile manufacturer, something he implies is a cushy job. Mads Skjern, however, changes this perception when he, with Katrine Larsen's aid, buys a major share in the same company. Elisabeth considers leaving Korsbæk for Copenhagen, but through Doctor Hansen's and Ingeborg Skjern's intervention, she is given the job as church organist by Mads Skjern, chairman of the parish council. Maude reveals her pregnancy to Hans-Christian and is forced by circumstances to tell the children, with Regitze responding in a particular hostile manner. Kristen, miserable in his marriage, sees an opportunity to patch things up with Elisabeth.
14	2	"The Pieces: Winter 1938 - Spring 1939" (Danish: Brikkerne: Vinter 1938 - Forår 1939)	Lise Nørgaard	13 December 1980	73 minutes
Jørgen Varnæs feels Mads' hand when Jørgen has taken an early Christmas vacation (on December 7) and has traveled to Switzerland. Upon his return a month later, Mads de facto reduces Jørgen's salary by half. Jørgen seeks help from his brother who is unable to provide any relief. Hans-Christian bites the bullet and seeks out Mads to speak for Jørgen. When Daniel gets pneumonia, Mads holds Daniel's teacher, Mr. Andersen, responsible. But Andersen lands on his feet. Kristen and Iben's marriage becomes further strained and Mr. Schwann dies (off-screen). (Note: (The actor playing Mr. Schwann, Arthur Jensen, had demanded a raise and made a media affair of it when it was not granted. As a result, he was written out of the series).)
15	3	"To Think and to Have Faith: Autumn 1939" (Danish: At Tænke og Tro: Efterår 1939)	Karen Smith	20 December 1980	73 minutes
As Oluf Larsen is arranging pictures of assorted fascists in his outhouse, he's surprised by Herbert Schmidt, returned from Spain. He's reunited with Vicki, who'd become a teacher at the private school (replacing teacher Andersen). World War II breaks out causing rationing of certain goods in Denmark (sugar and gasoline). Agnes is to wait at Daniel's confirmation party, leaving Lauritz to look after the children - with the most serious consequences. Colonel Hackel is hospitalized with failing health. Upon learning of a change in the Danish army's command structure, he suffers a fatal stroke while in hospital. Lauritz' failure to look after the children causes a rift between Agnes and him. She starts a small business at home so she can look after the children. Daniel's confirmation is honoured by a visit from the pious Anna, older sister of Mads and Kristen. The visit causes several stirs and Mads reconsiders his religious views.
16	4	"Laura's Big Day: Spring 1940" (Danish: Lauras Store Dag: Forår 1940)	Lise Nørgaard	27 December 1980	86 minutes
Laura, having served the Varnæs family for 25 years, is going with Maude to Copenhagen to receive a medal for "loyal service". There, Maude, through a childhood friend meets a German who presents himself as a banker. Agnes, coming to see Laura get the medal, looks up Herbert Schmidt who's putting up a play called "The Boots" in Copenhagen. Herbert reveals to Agnes that he's going to Sweden immediately, and he tells her to say to Lauritz "now it begins". Coming back to Korsbæk, Elisabeth invites Laura to dinner at Postgaarden. The next day, Laura hears airplanes and wakes up the Varnæs couple twice - first to tell them that old Mrs. Møhge wants to visit her safety-deposit box because of the invading Germans - next to show them leaflets dropped by actual invading Germans. The same day, Laura resigns, much to Maude's dismay. The new mayor, a social democrat, plays the bourgeois families of Korsbæk off against each other at a town meeting to secure funding for a new sports and recreational park and (more covertly) road construction outside Korsbæk.
17	5	"Coming of Age: Summer 1941 - Spring 1942" (Danish: De Voksnes Rækker: Sommer 1941 - Forår 1942)	Paul Hammerich	3 January 1981	80 minutes
Sofus Jensen, Korsbæk's beat policeman, seeks out Lauritz along with a police lieutenant early in the morning of 22 June 1941, the day Hitler declares war against the Soviet Union. The good natured officer feigns a story that Lauritz has already left the premises so as to give Lauritz a chance to escape. Lauritz seeks help from the Larsen family, and through Kathrine, Lauritz gets a lift to Copenhagen via a reluctant Mads. At the same time Ingeborg receives a letter from Holger, her divorced husband and biological father of Ellen. Events cause romancing Ulrik Varnæs and Ellen Skjern to end their relationship and Ulrik to disgrace his mother, Maude. A resistance group centered around Dr. Louis Hansen begins forming eventually recruiting an eager Kristen Skjern, rekindling his relationship with Elisabeth. Pig trader Oluf Larsen is shattered when his beloved 15-year-old fox terrier, Kvik, expires at the railway restaurant, and in a minor quarrel with the German Wehrmacht, now-99-year-old Mrs. Møhge also dies in the middle of the main street. Her daughter Misse inherits a large sum from her mother, causing the teacher Andersen, who's been thrown out by Mrs. Vinther, to seek out Misse Møhge.
18	6	"Mr. Stein: 1943" (Danish: Hr. Stein: 1943)	Lise Nørgaard	10 January 1981	80 minutes
Skjern's business is thriving despite the war - in part due to Daniel's help. The local resistance group launch sabotage missions, and the pictures of dictators in Larsen's outhouse has him thrown in jail, which puts the entire resistance-group in danger, causing Baron von Rüdtger to also get involved with the movement. Mr. Stein, Varnæs' trusted bank manager, falls victim to harassment due to his Jewish background, and later he must flee the bank as the Germans launch their endlösung hunt for the Danish Jews on 1 October 1943. During Ellen Skjern's wedding, the now fugitive Stein seeks out the Varnæs household, but as Hans Christian is being detained in Copenhagen, Maude must take matters into her own hands with aid from an unexpected part.

=== Season 4 (1981–1982) ===
No. overall	No. in season	Title	Written by	Original release date	Length (minutes)
19	1	"Wheeling and Dealing: Spring 1944" (Danish: Handel og Vandel: Forår 1944)	Lise Nørgaard	28 November 1981	58 minutes
Doctor Hansen seeks out Agnes Jensen and offers her to flee with her children to Sweden, where her husband Lauritz is. But her business is thriving, and she refuses. For business, Agnes seeks out Mads Skjern, who is impressed by her ingenuity. Mads agrees to a rare and lavish bet, when Agnes desires to buy her business' lodging house from Kathrine Larsen, which only Agnes believes that Kathrine can be talked into. Meanwhile, Mads is reluctant to do business with the Wehrmacht, while also warning his brother Kristen against his operations in the resistance. Kristen's marriage is a sham, and his wife Iben almost never sleeps at home. Skjold Hansen and his wife are being harassed by local children, due to Skjold Hansen's dealings with the Wehrmacht, which leads to a confrontation between Skjold Hansen and the father of the children, a bicycle store owner. Baron von Rydtger often visits Ingeborg Skjern, since his Nazi-hating wife of German descent has suffered a nervous breakdown. Daniel Skjern visits the family with a woman, who turns out to be an elderly lady, Ms. Mose, who sees potential in Daniel as an haute couture designer; much to the dismay of Mads, who wants his son to focus on business. Misse Møhge wishes to marry the money-grubbing Andersen, but confides to the Varnæs brothers that they are to inherit her mother's lavish fortune, since this was Mrs. Fernando Møhge's original wish. Consul Holm, the chairman of Korsbæk Bank, dies (Note: (The actor, Karl Stegger, in fact died in 1980 after a long illness and the character had only been alluded to for some time in the series)) and Skjold Hansen is eager for his position. He attempts to secure a deal with Varnæs by offering his own available position on the board to Varnæs' brother Jørgen in exchange for becoming the chairman. Varnæs refuses, in part because he has finally lost all faith in his brother.
20	2	"The Eleventh Hour: January - April 1945" (Danish: Den 11. Time: Januar - April 1945)	Lise Nørgaard	5 December 1981	62 minutes
The war makes it increasingly difficult to secure heat even for the Varnæs family, who send their children to the public bath house. Misse Møhge wishes to arrange her financial plans with the Varnæs brothers before her wedding, but the brothers seek a delay because of the ongoing war. Misse and Andersen are married. Mads seeks to purchase a seaside farm house and estate, which he wishes to divide up and sell. He enters a shady tax-evading deal with both the house's owner and Jørgen Varnæs, who buys the farm on behalf of Mads, in exchange for a small unsolicited fee. Ms. Jørgensen moves in with Violet Vinter to save money, but spends increasing time working for Agnes Jensen. The Skjerns are suddenly visited by a Danish-German Wehrmacht officer, forcing the resistance man Kristen to sneak out of through the back door and flee to Elisabeth Skjern's apartment for renewed identity papers, since he believes that the Germans are looking for him. However, the German officer is merely delivering a last gift and message from Ellen's biological father Holger, who has died in combat on the Eastern front. When the officer leaves, Mads decides that the package and letter should be burned. Iben Skjern seeks out Elisabeth to call off the alarm, but Kristen isn't there. Iben takes the opportunity to tell Elisabeth that she seeks to end her marriage with Kristen, and that Elisabeth can have him. The times are lawless, and waiter Boldt is assaulted by hoodlums and robbed of both cash box and his illegal ration stamps. Agnes Jensen seeks out Kathrine Larsen, trying to secure the purchase of her business' lodging house. Kathrine refuses, but changes her mind when Agnes tells her of the 200 kroner bet Agnes has made with Mads. Agnes thereby wins the bet, which greatly impresses Mads. Ulla Jacobsen and boyfriend Poul Kristensen wish to be engaged following the war, and Mads Skjern pledges to help find them an apartment. However, resistance man Poul is shot dead by the Germans following a weapons pick up that goes awry, causing Kristen Skjern and Doctor Hansen to go underground and Elisabeth to move in with the Varnæsses. Adolf Hitler dies in Germany and the Varnæsses celebrate, until Misse Møhge arrives to reveal that her husband Andersen is also dead. However, Misse is pleased that she is now a widow, just like her mother.
21	3	"Peace on Earth and Goodwill Toward Men: May–June 1945" (Danish: Vi vil fred her til lands: Maj-Juni 1945)	Lise Nørgaard	12 December 1981	59 minutes
The funeral dinner for Misse Møhge's late husband Frederik Andersen is progressing at the Varnæs house when the radio suddenly broadcasts the news that the Germans have surrendered in Denmark. Amidst general rejoicing, Dr. Hansen and Kristen Skjern reappear and pay a visit to the Varnæs house, where Kristen is reunited with Elisabeth Varnæs. Mads is very nervous about Ellen, since her father-in-law had lucrative business dealings with the Germans and has been arrested as a collaborator. Mads decides to find Ellen and bring her home. Oskar Andersen tells the Varnæs brothers that he believes that there are mysterious aspects to his uncle's death, and demands their help in investigating the matter. Lauritz returns to Korsbæk and angers the (now prosperous and independent) Agnes with his plan to move the family to Copenhagen, where the Party has offered him a position. The dog left behind by the departing Germans is adopted by Laura and is allowed to live downstairs at the Varnæs house. Arrested as a collaborator at the instigation of the bicycle repairman next door, Viggo Skjold Hansen suffers a small stroke. Misse Møhge visits Hans Christian and Maude and tells the truth about Frederick's death: she prevented his husbandly advances by locking him on the balcony of their house for six hours, which triggered the pneumonia that killed him. Daniel returns to Korsbæk with an English wing commander named Jim Donaldson. Ellen flirts with the man, and Daniel becomes jealous. Only Ingeborg seems to understand what is happening and reproaches Mads for his lack of awareness.
22	4	"All's Well: Winter 1945-46" (Danish: Det går jo Godt: Vinter 1945-46)	Lise Nørgaard	19 December 1981	58 minutes
Skjold Hansen has announced his retirement from the Korsbæk Bank Board. Bank President Jessen suggests that Jørgen Varnæs return to the board as Skjold Hansen's replacement, but he wishes to meet with him first. Hans Christian Varnæs organizes a dinner for them. There, Jessen confronts Jørgen with his suspicion that his wife, who is the sister of the seller, was defrauded of her share of the proceeds from the farm sale that Jørgen conducted as a front for Mads Skjern. Jessen demands an investigation, before he will nominate Jørgen for the vacant bank directorship. Jørgen seeks out Mads Skjern who advises him to keep quiet about what he knows. Kathrine Larsen receives a package from Herbert Schmidt, who has settled in Los Angeles. The package contains gifts of food, cigars and stockings, to be shared among Vicki, Agnes and Lauritz, and Katrine and Oluf Larsen. His short letter strangely lacks any special message for Vicki, which disappoints her. A plaque and portrait is hung in the District Bank in honor of the bank clerk and Resistance fighter, Poul Kristensen, who was shot by the Germans. After the ceremony, the new bank clerk Arne Schmidt invites Ulla Jacobsen to dinner at the fancy hotel restaurant "Post House". That same day, a similar ceremony is held in the Korsbæk Bank for Mrs. Fernando Møhge who also died "confronting the Germans." Ms. Jørgensen and Violet Vinter's relationship deteriorates further, and Jørgensen flees to Agnes Jensen's workroom, where she will spend the night. Agnes soon devises a plan by which she can help Miss. Jørgensen as well as her business. By renting the upstairs apartment to Jørgensen, who will then sublet the main room back to the business, she can by-pass regulations that restrict the conversion of residences for business use. Agnes asks Mads Skjern to put in a good word with the mayor, to allow the tenancy. Daniel Skjern has quit business school to work as an haute couture dress designer. This news enrages Mads, who is eventually calmed down by Ellen. Regitze Varnæs informs her family of her intention to work in Hamburg censoring mail for the occupying authorities. Ulrik Varnæs comes home with a waitress named Maja, who it turns out he has made pregnant. His father refuses to give him money for an abortion. On the same visit, Ulrik secretly meets with his old flame Ellen Skjern, who is herself unhappily married. Her husband Mogens Lamborg breaks his arm in a drunk-driving auto accident with the company car - while out carousing with Iben Skjern and her friend Jenny. In the final scene, Mads receives a letter awarding him a knighthood.
23	5	"Among Brothers: 1946" (Danish: Mellem Brødre: 1946)	Lise Nørgaard	26 December 1981	63 minutes
Ulrik reveals to Ellen that he is to marry Maja, prompting Ellen to sever all relations. Misse, now a widow, reveals to the leading ladies of the town that she's attracting men - even the pious Provost Meyer, who she claims to have seen on her balcony. Chairman Jessen from Korsbæk Bank, unsatisfied with the business involving Jørgen, finds another candidate for the board position - the Mayor. Mads gets wind of this and arranges the Mayor's inclusion in Omegnsbanken's board, while accusing Kristen of professional negligence. The issue is settled when Jessen, to prevent Jørgen from getting the seat, convinces the now-passive Skjold-Hansen to stay. Meanwhile, pregnant Maja, now living in the Varnæs house, tries to adapt to a very different lifestyle and is by chance assisted by Agnes. Jørgen Varnæs embarrasses himself at the restaurant, but is "saved" by the timely appearance of Gitte Graa. This prompts Jørgen to try to call in all favors he feels are owed to him, estranging him from his family as well as being ousted by Mads. Elizabeth reveals her secret marriage to Kristen and moves in with him. The couple hosts a dinner for both families and reconciliation in the making. At a return dinner hosted by Hans Christian and Maude, Hans Christian and Dr. Hansen, both late for the dinner, arrive and inform the guests that they have just gotten Jørgen out of jail and had him committed to a hospital. Kristen mostly blames Mads for Jørgen's destruction; it's the final straw and he decides to sever business ties with Mads, quitting his job and moving with Elizabeth to Copenhagen and a new job. The confrontation leaves Mads very upset.
24	6	"New Look: 1947" (Danish: Series Finale)	Lise Nørgaard	2 January 1982	82 minutes
Mads comes home from a trip to USA bringing with him new business ideas. Calling on Daniel to help implement the ideas - despite Daniel not having completed his exams - Mads is yet again disappointed when Daniel declines, and opts to go to Paris and study fashion. Misse's predicament - attraction of the opposite sex - worsens and she finds herself in a situation where she accuses not only the head waiter at the Post House of "touching" her, but also directing the same accusation against the supposed arresting officer - Sofus - she has summoned. Mads recruits Agnes to replace Daniel. She reluctantly accepts, on the condition that she'll hand over her business to Mads in exchange of stock in Skjern's businesses. Dr. Hansen decides to fight the pollution of the nearby fjord which has him running the gauntlet as local politicians, union leaders, business owners and industry accuse him of "dirtying the nest," making him choose to leave the town entirely. Herbert Schmidt is showing his play in Belgium and calls on his old friends to come and visit him. All but Vicki decline and upon her return without Herbert, she reveals that "six years is a long time". Daniel, visiting from Paris (where Katrine helped set him up) brings along a male friend, Francois. Discovering the nature of their relationship, Mads exiles Daniel and severs all ties. This prompts Ingeborg to leave Mads and seek out Daniel in Paris. Alone with Erik, Mads invites Agnes Jensen for supper. Disillusioned by the abandonment of his entire family (Daniel, Ingeborg, Ellen wanting to become a dentist and Erik a nuclear physicist), he turns to Agnes, and in a mental breakdown all but pronounces her as his successor in business. Meanwhile, Lauritz, having run for parliament, is disappointed when the communist party is halved, and Lauritz is without a parliament seat and a job. Agnes realizes that he's broken, and attempts to invigorate him by offering him the typist-business she's been running. Lauritz - reluctant at first - accepts. Ingeborg returns from Paris, having realized that Daniel doesn't need her. Ingeborg consults her parents, and Katrine advises her to go back to Mads. Ingeborg seeks out Mads, under the impression that he's bedridden. However, on that same day, Mads has been pronounced Swedish Consul, something that has gotten him out of bed. Ingeborg then takes a walk with Baron von Rydtger. The two say how they have missed each other while she was in Paris. It is now clear they are more intimate than Mads knows (she tells the Baron "the practical thing with you is that you have your own forest"). The Varnæs couple hosts a lavish dinner to celebrate their 25th anniversary, having invited along the Skjern Family. In his speech, Hans Christian even addresses the Skjern family, provoking Laura, the only one keeping up appearances, to return discreetly to the kitchen.

== List of characters ==
Characters alphabetically:

Character	Episodes	No.	Actor
Ada	21-23	3	Lillian Tillegreen
Agnes Jensen	1-10,12-24	23	Kirsten Olesen
Agnete Hansen	6,8,10,11,14	5	Lene Brøndum
Albert Arnesen	1,2,3,4,5	5	Preben Mahrt
Aksel (Jensen)	(15,16),(20,21),(24)	5	Casper Bentson, Søren Maker, | Jan Neiiendam
Arnold Vinter	1-6,8,10-12,14	11	Esper Hagen
Baron Carl von Rydtger	8,13,14,16-19,21-24	11	Bendt Rothe
Baroness Arendse von Rydtger	3,8,10	3	Birgitte Federspiel
Consul (Emanuel) Holm	3,4,6-8,10-12,15,18	10	Karl Stegger
Consul's Wife (Oda) Holm	2-8,10-13,15,16,18-24	20	Else-Marie Juul Hansen
Daniel Andersen-Skjern/Skjern	(1,6),(8-12),(15),(17-19,21,22,24)	14	Kristian Steen Rem, Jacob Dalgård, Jim Erichsen, Niels Martin Carlsen
Doctor (Louis) Hansen	1,4-15,17-24	21	Ove Sprogøe
Elisabeth Friis	1-24	24	Helle Virkner
Ellen Andersen-Skjern/Skjern	(1,6),(8-12),(15),(17-19,21-23)	14	Helle Nielsen, Nynne Ubbe, Christine Hermansen, Benedikte Dahl
Erik Skjern	(8-10),(14),(21),(24)	6	Kenneth Schmidt, Nikolaj Harris, Lari Hørsted, Jens Christian Milbrat
Ernst Nyborg	8	1	Morten Grunwald
Ester	12-21,24	11	Birgitte Bruun
Aunt Anna (Skjern)	15	1	Kirsten Rolffes
Frede "Fatty" Hansen	1-5,7-24	23	Benny Hansen
Miss Hollenberg	15-18	4	Christiane Rohde
Gitte Graa	4,6-8,23	5	Susse Wold
Gudrun	3-5,7-21,24	19	Anne Jensen
Gustav Friis	10,13,23,24	4	Finn Storgaard
Hans Christian Varnæs	1-14,16-24	23	Holger Juul Hansen
Helle Varnæs	19-22,24	5	Ditte Maria Norup
Herbert Schmidt	9-12,15-17	7	Paul Hüttel
Holger Jørgensen	6,9,17	3	John Martinus
Mr. (Rudolf) Schwann	1-4,6-12	11	Arthur Jensen
Iben Skjold Hansen	10-23	14	Ulla Henningsen
Ingeborg Andersen-Skjern/Skjern	1-24	24	Ghita Nørby
Inger Jørgensen	1-6,12,14,15,19-24	15	Vera Gebuhr
Jenny	13,14,16-18,22,23	7	Lane Lind
Jim Donaldson	21	1	Nicholas Farrell
Jørgen Varnæs	1,3-8,10,13,14,16,18-23	17	Bent Mejding
Kathrine Larsen	1-4,6-13,15-20,22,24	20	Lily Broberg
Knud (Jensen)	(15),(19-21),(24)	5	Martin Bak, Sebastian Sørensen, Sune Kristensen
Kristen Andersen-Skjern/Skjern	4-24	21	Jesper Langberg
Laura (Larsine Sørensen)	1-10,12-24	23	Elin Reimer
Lauritz "Red" Jensen	1-5,7-17,21-24	20	Kurt Ravn
Mads Andersen-Skjern/Skjern	1-24	24	Jørgen Buckhøj
Maja Ebbesen/Varnæs	22-24	3	Rikke Wølck
Marie Hansen	8,9,11,15,16,18-23	11	Kirsten Hansen-Møller
Mason (Jacob) Jessen	22,23	2	Poul Reichhardt
Maude Varnæs	1-24	24	Malene Schwartz
Mayor Sejersen	16	1	Preben Harris
Minna Varnæs	1,3,5	3	Ellen Winther Lembourn
Miss (Illona) Mikkelsen	3,10,13-15,17	6	Hanne Løye
Misse Møhge	1-5,7-24	23	Karin Nellemose
Mogens Lamborg	17-23	7	John Schelde
Mr. Stein	1-9,12,13,15-18,21-24	19	John Hahn-Petersen
Mr. Town council secretary Godtfred Lund	7-11	5	Hardy Rafn
Mrs. Fernando Møhge	1-5,7-18	17	Karen Berg
Mrs. Mason (Sofie) Jessen	22,23	2	Bodil Udsen
Mrs. Town council secretary Lilli Lund	7,8,11,12	4	Tove Maës
Musse Skjold Hansen	7,8,10-13,15,16,18,19,21,23	12	Birthe Backhausen
Colonel (Ditlev) Hackel	1,4-8,11-13,15	10	Bjørn Watt-Boolsen
Oluf Larsen	1-24	24	Buster Larsen
Oscar Andersen	20,21	2	Nis Bank-Mikkelsen
Head teacher (Frederik) Andersen	13-15,17-20	7	Helge Kjærulff-Schmidt
Poul Kristensen	13,15,17,20	4	Christian Steffensen
Regitze Varnæs	(1-6),(8-13),(17,18,22)	15	Nicla Ursin, Elisabeth Danneskjold-Samsø, Camilla Hammerich
Sofus "Betjent" (Jensen) police officer	16-19,21,22,24	7	Esben Pedersen
Ulla Jacobsen	7-15,17,20,22	12	Karen Lise Mynster
Ulrik Varnæs	(1-6),(8-13),(17,18,22-24)	17	Søren Bruun, Henrik Mortensen, Jens Arentzen
Vicki Arnesen/Halli/Hackel	1-6,11-16,18-24	19	Sonja Oppenhagen
Viggo Skjold Hansen	7-13,15,16,19,21-23	13	Axel Strøbye
Violet Vinter	3-12,14,15,17,19,20,22,24	17	Lis Løwert
Waiter (Severin) Boldt	1-5,7-20,22-24	22	Per Pallesen
Aage Holmdal	1-4,6	5	Joen Bille

== Important characters ==
=== The Skjern dynasty ===
- Mads (Andersen)-Skjern — (1:24) Jørgen Buckhøj- (born 1897) Scion of the Skjern dynasty.

Mads is a stranger who arrives in Korsbæk with his motherless son Daniel as a traveling salesman in 1929. Seeing that the local clothing shop caters only to the interests of the well-to-do, he decides to start his own business, Skjern's Magasin, to provide clothing for the common people. Personality: Industrious; almost ruthless businessman who does not "forgive and forget"; a stern and overbearing father who expects much of his son Daniel. As time goes by he becomes increasingly stern to his son, as he slowly realizes that he will never be ready to take over the family business. Instead he favors his adoptive daughter Ellen, who is doing well in school, unlike Daniel. Because of this, she can get away with almost everything. When he accidentally finds out about his son's homosexuality, he banishes him from his home. This action almost costs him his marriage to Ingeborg.

As his business grows, Mads, originally honest and well-meaning, is corrupted by his growing power and occasionally engages in questionable business practices. Despite his religious upbringing he eventually assimilates into a more moderate lifestyle. His political views are conservative, particularly concerning morals, as he is a firm opponent of abortion, then illegal in Denmark.

- Ingeborg (Andersen)-Skjern — (1:24) Ghita Nørby - (born c. 1901)

Wife of Mads Andersen-Skjern and daughter of Oluf and Katrine Larsen. She is also the mother of Ellen from a previous marriage. She and Mads eventually have a child named Erik. Despite loving to work, Mads insists she tends the house in the style of a proper upper class wife. Personality: Kind, loving, modern, intelligent; unlike Mads, she is far kinder to Daniel; still, she too turns a blind eye on Ellen's choices as she grows older.

- Kristen (Andersen)-Skjern — (4:24) Jesper Langberg - (born c.1899)

He is the younger brother of Mads Skjern and Anna Skjern. Kristen arrives in Korsbæk about a year after Mads, and eventually becomes director of Omegns Bank, a bank for the lower-class denizens of Korsbæk. When the Nazis occupy Denmark, he becomes active in the Danish resistance movement along with Dr. Louis Hansen. Personality: An honest man; unlike his brother, he is more willing to overlook class differences and has few social ambitions. He has an on-and-off relationship with Elisabeth Friis, sister-in-law of Hans Christian Varnæs, but after a particularly grim falling-out between them, he marries Iben Skjold-Hansen, which turned out disastrous and they divorce. In episode 23 he finally marries Elisabeth Friis (Skjern).

- Daniel Skjern — (1-6) Kristian Steen Rem; (8-12) Jacob Dalgård, (15) Jim Erichsen; (17-19,21,22,24) Niels Martin Carlsen (born c. 1924)

He is the son of Mads Skjern and his first wife. His father wants him to join the family business, but he displays poor business skills and can't live up to his father's expectations. Instead he shows talent for design and fashion; a field where he later enjoys a certain success and becomes marginally involved in his father's business. Daniel is a homosexual, which is near impossible for his father to accept though Ingeborg and Katrine readily accepts it.

- Ellen (Andersen)-Skjern — (1-6) Helle Nielsen; (8-12) Nynne Ubbe; (15) Christine Hermansen; (17-19,21-23) Benedikte Dahl (born c. 1924)

The daughter of Ingeborg Skjern and her former husband Holger Jørgensen. She is adopted by Mads Skjern. As a talented student, she is soon her father's favourite (Mads), whom he loves more than his own son Daniel. Under pressure from her father, she marries a wealthy businessman's son, because it is a good alliance. Ulrik Varnæs is deeply in love with her, but due to unfortunate circumstances their relationship never develop. Eventually she divorces her husband, rejects her father's offer to take over the business and goes off to study dentistry.

- Erik Skjern — (8-10) Kenneth Schmidt; (14) Nikolaj Harris; (21) Lari Hørsted; (24) Jens Christian Milbart (born 1933)

Mads and Ingeborg's youngest child. He is a talented student but despite (or because of) his skills in mathematics, a subject Mads values above anything else as it is a prerequisite for running a business, he also rejects his father's offer to take over the business, as his two elder siblings. Instead he expresses a desire to go on to study nuclear physics.

- Aunt Anna (Skjern) — (15) Kirsten Rolffes

Mads' and Kristen's older sister. She arrives in Korsbæk to attend Daniel's conformation. She is a member of the Inner Mission (a Danish pietist movement), like Mads was. She heavily disapproves Mads's new lifestyle, and his choice of wife. This leads to a confrontation with Mads, where he banishes her from his house.

- Oluf Larsen — (1-24) Buster Larsen

Father of Ingeborg. He is a pig's merchant and very good-natured. He helped finance Mads' business after Hans Christian Varnæs refused to lend him money, alongside the backing Mads got from relatives at home in Jutland. Oluf Larsen and his wife Katrine are certainly wealthy, perhaps richer than anyone else in town, yet they still belong to the "working class" and is looked down upon by the bourgeoisie. He is friends with Røde, Fede and waiter Bolt.

- Kathrine Larsen — (1-4,6-13,15-20,22,24) Lily Broberg

She is Oluf's wife and is both kind and wise. She manages the majority of the money that Oluf brings home. She invests it in various lands and property, but is very distrustful towards investing in stocks. When Mads ask her to invest in his new bank she refuses but instead offers to give 10’000 kr. to him, his wife and each of his children. (In present prices this will probably be around 400’000 $.)

When Agnes is planning to buy the building in which she has created her home and business from Katrine, she tricks Mads into betting 200 kr. that Katrine will never sell. When Agnes ask, Kathrine predictably refuses to sell; but when Agnes says that she made a bet with Mads, who didn't think she would sell, and in fact was "dead certain" of that, she is persuaded. Thus Mads loses his first and only bet.

=== The Varnæs dynasty ===
- Hans Christian Varnæs — Holger Juul Hansen - (born c.1894) The director of Korsbæk Bank and husband of Maude Varnæs (née Friis), and the father of three children, Ulrik, Regitze, and Helle. He is the elder brother of Jørgen Varnæs.

Personality: Kind, loving and to some extent care-free. For the most part, a competent bank director although his bank tends to look down its nose at those who are not members of high society; though usually a devoted husband, he once had an affair with his much-younger secretary Ulla Jacobsen.

- Maude Varnæs — Malene Schwartz - The wife of Hans Christian Varnæs. Spoiled by her husband. She uses her time as hostess of visits from other high society persona in Korsbæk. It is hinted that she tricked Hans Christian Varnæs into marrying her by getting pregnant with their first child Ulrik. During the war, and especially while rescuing the Jewish banker Mr. Stein, who works in her husband's bank, from the Nazi Jew-hunt, her character changes into a brave woman of action that starts seeing people for who they are instead of through upper class eyes.
- Jørgen Varnæs — Bent Mejding Younger brother of Hans Christian Varnæs. He is a slick lawyer and would-be MP living in the fast lane. His wife leaves him when she learns about his affair with Gitte Graa and eventually his life takes a turn for the worse not least due to his alcoholism and utter inability to live within his means.
- Elisabeth Friis — Helle Virkner - Sister of Maude Varnæs - (born c.1894). Lives with (and in the shadow of) Maude and Hans Christian and tends to their two children Ulrik and Regitze as well as looking after the house. Falls in love with Mads Skjern's brother Kristen when he arrives in Korsbæk. The relationship is broken due to the bad relationship between the Skjern and Varnæs families. During the war she enters the Danish resistance movement together with Doctor Louis Hansen and Kristen Skjern and through that re-enters the relationship with Kristen. Eventually marries Kristen and moves away from Korsbæk and their respective families.
- Ulrik Varnæs — Søren Bruun (child), Jens Arentzen (adult) - (born c.1923) A spoiled child. In love with Ellen Skjern. Impregnates a servant girl while studying at the university and eventually marries her, much to his mother's regret. Is destined to take over the bank from his father.
- Regitze Varnæs — Camilla Hammerich A spoiled child that's well behaved in her younger years, and becomes an independent freedom-seeking woman. While in her tweens she all but rejects her mother due to being denied a puppy because of Maudes pregnancy with Helle. This creates a permanent rift between Regitze and her mother than never fully heals. Becomes rebellious and is said to be involved with a married man in Germany where she moves to work as a censor of German letters.
- Helle Varnæs — Ditte Maria Norup - (born c.1938) A "late arrival" of Maude and Hans Christian Varnæs. Little is known of her fate. She becomes the primary reason for a permanent rift between Regitze Varnæs and her mother.
- Minna Varnæs — Ellen Winther Lembourn - Wife to Jørgen Varnes. Divorces him and destroys his political career, as her father is highly placed in the conservative party.
- Gustav Friis — Finn Storgaard - Elizabeth and Maudes younger brother. Infrequent occurrences in the series. He has political ambitions and takes an interest in Vicki Hackel.

=== Friends of Varnæs ===
- Doctor Hansen (Louis Hansen), MD — Ove Sprogøe - Doctor of medicine, moved to Korsbæk from Funen (speaks a dialect). Is, like Laura, a person that evolves only a little, and is also a de facto centre of the series. He attends all walks of life (being a doctor) and is somewhat snobbish, but also in touch with regular people. Among the conservative upper class in town he is an odd figure because of his political sympathies for the Radikale Venstre. He is in love with Elizabeth Friis, which is made obvious later in the series, and once it is mentioned that he may have been divorced and has a child.
- Mrs. Fernando Møhge (born 1843) — Karen Berg - An elderly lady who is the widow of Fernando Møhge, a grain and horse trader. Mrs. Møhge's given name is never revealed. She is quite eccentric and is somewhat of a town original. Despite outwardly appearing to have little money, she is in fact quite wealthy but very cheap. She and her late husband are considered among the leading citizens of Korsbæk (according to Laura, because the family hasn't moved away from the area in 200 years or so. She is hard of hearing at times, greedy and borderline senile. The Varnæs brothers refer to her as "Tante Møhge" (aunt Møhge) which might suggest that Mrs. Møhge in indeed their aunt (by blood or by marriage), although the Danish word "tante" could also be used as an informal honorary title for an esteemed elder woman. She dies in 1942, aged 99, after an angry encounter with a German soldier.
- Misse Møhge (born 1869) — Karin Nellemose - The chaste, spinster daughter of Mrs. Fernando Møhge. Is tyrannized by her mother whom she pushes around town in a wheelchair, despite her mother's ability to walk (which Misse claims is a miraculous act of will). Following the death of her mother, Misse becomes increasingly odd, even borderline insane, to the point that Mrs. Varnæs secretly admits that she is scared of her. In 1945, Misse marries Teacher Andersen, who dies on their wedding night because Misse locked him out in cold weather after he made sexual advances.
- Colonel Ditlev Hackel — Bjørn Watt-Boolsen Pompous, gruff army officer and garrison commandant i Korsbæk. He is rarely seen out of uniform. He belongs to local high society and is the father of Vicki Hackel.
- Consul Emmanuel Holm — Karl Stegger Background character. President of the board at Korsbæk Bank and, along with his wife, a frequent guest at the Varnæs family. Along with Skjold-Hansen he campaigns against Mads Skjern.
- Mrs. Consul Holm — Else Marie Juul Hansen - Wife of the Consul. Conservative to the bone.
- Master Jessen (Bricklayer) — Poul Reichhardt - Upper middle class eventual chairman of Korsbæk Banks board.
- Mrs. Jessen — Bodil Udsen - the very direct wife of Master Bricklayer Jessen. A horrible person who has it in for Jørgen Varnæs and provides, through her husband, Jørgens downfall.

=== Servants at Varnæs ===
- Laura Sørensen — Elin Reimer Faithful servant of the Varnæs family through many years. Laura is the de facto centre of the series, as all things somehow passes through her kitchen, the only real place where high and low both appear. She is also the only character that doesn't evolve throughout the series, insisting on maintaining a divide between the classes (born 1890) (she refuses to sit at the table in the last episode, where the Varnæs couple celebrate their 25th anniversary).
- Agnes Jensen — Kirsten Olesen Becomes the matriarch of "the third family". Originally she was a mere housemaid at the Varnæs house. She marries Røde (Red) and settles for a traditional family, but keeps working odd jobs. She eventually becomes an entrepreneur, starts her own business with great success. Towards the end of the series she starts working for Mads Skjern, and it's hinted at that she might one day take over that business, as Skjern's own children want nothing to do with it, and she has insisted on obtaining stocks in the company as part of her promotion. (born 1911)
- Miss Hollenberg — Christiane Rohde - A troublesome maid at Varnæs' house at some point during the war.
- Esther — Birgitte Bruun - A maid at the Varnæs' house. Finds employment at the Skjern's much to Laura's dismay.
- Mr. Stein — John Hahn-Petersen - Accountant in "Korsbæk Bank" and Hans Christian's right-hand man. Very competent yet subtle. He is Jewish and the catalyst of Maude's most significant development, as she is a vital factor in his escape to neutral Sweden during 1943's rescue of the Danish Jews. Much like Laura he doesn't evolve much throughout the series.
- Ulla Jacobsen — Karen-Lise Mynster - Trainee at Korsbæk Bank. Engages in an affair with Hans Christian that ends very unhappily.

=== Working class characters ===
- Frede "Fede" ("Fatty") Hansen (born 1893) — Benny Hansen - A good-hearted painter. He's a corpulent man who is seen eating in almost every scene he's in. He is a friend of Røde and Oluf with whom he shares a table at the local restaurant. To his friends amusement it is revealed upon Mrs. Fernando Møhges death, that he is the bastard child of the late Fernando Møhge and thus half-brother to Misse Møhge.
- Marie Hansen (Fede's wife) — Kirsten Hansen-Møller - Neutral person who is a friend and eventual employee of Agnes Jensen.
- Lauritz "Røde" ("Red") Jensen — Kurt Ravn Communist railroad worker and later husband to Agnes Jensen. He is often too preoccupied with political work and not spending time with his family. This lack of responsibility towards his family once nearly cost him his son's life, and his marriage. It was during Daniel Skjern's confirmation where Agnes served as a temporary maid that she relied upon him to look after the children. He failed at doing so as visitors from important party members kept him away from home, and in the meantime their oldest son fell in the nearby pond, almost drowning. Later, he is forced to flee to Sweden upon the German invasion of the Soviet Union in 1941.
- Waiter Boldt — Per Pallesen Background character who serves mostly as comic relief and an incurable gossip, which at times turns out to be decisive information for other characters' actions.

=== Characters in Damernes Magasin ===
- Albert Arnesen — Preben Mahrt - The second-generation owner of "Damernes Magasin", who is married to Vicki Hackel. Old money, but an inept businessman who shows little interest in running his business or adapting to the times. At the start of the series, he still does well due to owning the only clothing store in Korsbæk, but as soon as Mads Skjern starts a competing store, Albert's business starts to crumble, and goes bankrupt within a couple of years. He dies early on from a heart attack, but is widely reported to have killed himself with either a duelling gun or gas. The fate of Albert initiates the long-running feud between the Varnæs and Skjern families.
- Mr. (Rudolf) Schwann — Arthur Jensen - He has worked his entire life at "Damernes Magasin" and is utterly incapable of adapting to any new situation. He is an extremely proxy snob, who ends up living at Mrs. Vinther's and working as a debt collector until his death. Even though it is never clearly stated in the series, he is a closeted homosexual as he never shows any interest in women and doesn't have a physical relationship with Violet Vinther.
- Miss (Inger) Jørgensen — Vera Gebuhr - Employee at "Damernes Magasin". She is an old maid who is secretly in love with Albert Arnesen, but because she is of a lower class, never acted on her feelings. She despises Albert Arnesen's young wife, Vicki Hackel. She lives a meagre existence for some years, not adapting to any change until she finds a place as a housekeeper for Agnes Jensen.
- Arnold Vinther — Esper Hagen - Modern person who rebels against the society's norms, but not an anarchist. Early on, he changes workplace from "Damernes Magasin" to Mads Skjern's business, much to his mother's (Violet Vinther) dismay. He is a symbol of the transition between old and new. He has high ambitions and is disappointed when Mads promotes him to manager of a minor subsidiary of his business, but learns to see it as an opportunity. He ends up settling nicely with his annoying longtime girlfriend as his wife and their son (conceived out of wedlock).
- Vicki Hackel — Sonja Oppenhagen - A young girl who married the much older businessman Albert Arnesen in order to escape from a strict home. She is a bit of a tease and rather a spoiled brat in the beginning. However, she is the character that evolves the most throughout the series. At the end of the series, it is suggested that she finds a romantic interest in Gustav Friis, Maude and Elizabeth's younger brother.

=== Characters relating to the Skjern family ===
- Gudrun — Anne Jensen - Maid and later employed as a saleswoman at Skjerns Magasin (A very large step up in society in then-Denmark).
- Baron von Rydtger — Bent Rothe - Local nobility and a friend of the Skjern Family. He provides the Skjern family with backing both socially and financially. It is suggested that he has a mental, if not a physical relationship with Ingeborg, especially towards the end of the series.
- Baroness von Rydtger — Birgitte Federspiel - Wife of the Baron. Eventually goes mad (upon the German invasion of Denmark). She is of noble German descent.
- Godtfred Lund — Hardy Rafn - Secretary to the city council (administrator - non-political). Has a burdened economy and illegally helps Mads get a building approvement for a factory through bribery and deceit.

=== Other important characters ===
- Gitte Graa — Susse Wold – An heiress to the Graa family fortune. She is a loose woman, who likes nothing better than to drink champagne every day, and party the night away. Although she is a wealthy member of the upper class, she primarily uses men to pay for her expensive lifestyle. Quoting Ernst Nyborg "She is like a carousel, bringing joy to all around her. No one should expect to get all the rides, this is Jørgen's problem." She is the ultimate object of Jørgen's fascination which leads to his ultimate ruin.
- Viggo Skjold-Hansen — Axel Strøbye - Uninhibited local lawyer who buys Jørgen Varnæs' stock in Korsbæk Bank and thus a seat on the board. He finds his way into local high society, where his direct hell-raising approach is met with disapproval - not least by the Varnæs family. During the war he engages in businesses with the German occupiers and makes a lot of money. Immediately after the war he is falsely accused of being an informant to the Germans. During the liberation of Denmark he suffers a stroke that changes his personality to the exact opposite. He is saved by the intervention of Elisabeth Friis and the doctor who carries a lot of weight within the resistance movement. He is married to Musse Skjold-Hansen (the mother of his daughter Iben Skjold-Hansen).
- Musse Skjold-Hansen — Birthe Backhausen Wife of Viggo and source of Viggo's economic resources. She is Nouveau riche through her late father.
- Iben Skjold-Hansen — Ulla Henningsen Daughter of Viggo and Musse Skjold Hansen. Independent, restless young woman. Marries (unhappily) Kristen Skjern. Divorces him at the end of the war. She is hinted at being a lesbian.
- Herbert Schmidt — Paul Hüttel - German poet and refugee who arrives in Korsbæk. He lives with Lauritz and Agnes Jensen for some time before he escapes the German invasion. Vicki Hackel and he are dating for a while, and she remains in love with him for the entire series. He is close to Katrine and Oluf Larsen who takes him in when he can't stay with Agnes and Lauritz Jensen anymore. The character Herbert Schmidt may have been based on Berthold Brecht who actually did flee the Nazi regime and settled down in Denmark for some time.
- Violet Vinther — Lis Løwert - Dance instructor and widowed mother of Arnold Vinther. At first she keeps the company of Mr. Schwann and later Frederik Andersen for a while. She, like Laura, is a character that "connects the dots" and doesn't evolve throughout the series. Late in the series she develops a fondness for alcohol and loose relationship with businessmen.
- Ernst Nyborg — Morten Grunwald Artist who briefly visits Korsbæk. He was once Maude Varnæs' art teacher and attempts to seduce her and start an affair with her while he is in Korsbæk. The affair never occurs as he turns to Gitte Graa, but Maude's feelings were mutual and she acted on them. This experience provides her with a moral excuse for forgiving Hans Christian's affair with an employee.
- Teacher Frederik Andersen — Helge Kjærulff-Schmidt - An older, strict teacher and widower that is freeloading off the single (widowed or spinster) women of Korsbæk and an absolutely unappealing character. He has it in for Mads Skjern's son Daniel. Eventually, he marries Misse Møhge for her money.

=== Minor characters ===
- Oscar Andersen — Nis Bank-Mikkelsen - Nephew to Frederik Andersen. Minor role.
- Olsen — Holger Perfort - Waiter at Postgaarden
- Miss Mikkelsen — Hanne Løye - Headmistress of the private school in Korsbæk.
- Lily Lund — Tove Maës - Distressed, helpless wife of Godtfred Lund.
