= Medea (1988 film) =

- Directed by: Lars von Trier
- Screenplay by: Carl Theodor Dreyer
- Based on: Medea play by Euripides
- Starring: Udo Kier; Kirsten Olesen; Henning Jensen
- Cinematography: Sejr Brockmann
- Edited by: Finnur Sveinsson
- Music by: Joachim Holbek
- Distributed by: Danmarks Radio
- Release date: 1 April 1988
- Running time: 76 minutes
- Country: Denmark
- Language: Danish

Medea is a 1988 Danish tragedy television film directed by Lars von Trier. It is based on Carl Theodor Dreyer's adaptation of Euripides' play Medea. The setting is changed from the Mediterranean to a Danish, vaguely Iron Age setting.

== Plot ==
King Creon of Corinth wants to secure his throne. In order to do this, he wants to marry the successful warrior Jason to his daughter Glauce. Jason accepts, but he is already married to Medea. Since Medea is known as a wise woman, Creon feels need to banish Medea and her two boys from the city. She begs him to let him stay, but he gives her only one day in order to secure the needs of the two boys.

Medea makes an agreement with the king of Athens, Aegeus, that she and the two boys can come live in Athens with his protection. She then plans to murder both Glauce and Creon and eventually her own children.

== Cast ==
- Udo Kier as Jason
- Kirsten Olesen as Medea
- Henning Jensen as Creon
- Solbjørg Højfeldt as Nurse
- Preben Lerdorff Rye as Pedagog
- Baard Owe as Aegeus
- Ludmilla Glinska as Glauce
- Vera Gebuhr as Old Chaperone
- Jonny Kilde as Old Boy
- Richard Kilde as Young Boy
- Dick Kaysø as Voice of Jaeson
- Mette Munk Plum as Voice of Glauce

== Critical reception ==
The film was received with critical acclaim. Rotten Tomatoes gives a score of 86% based on 14 reviews.
