= Susse Wold =

Danish actress and singer

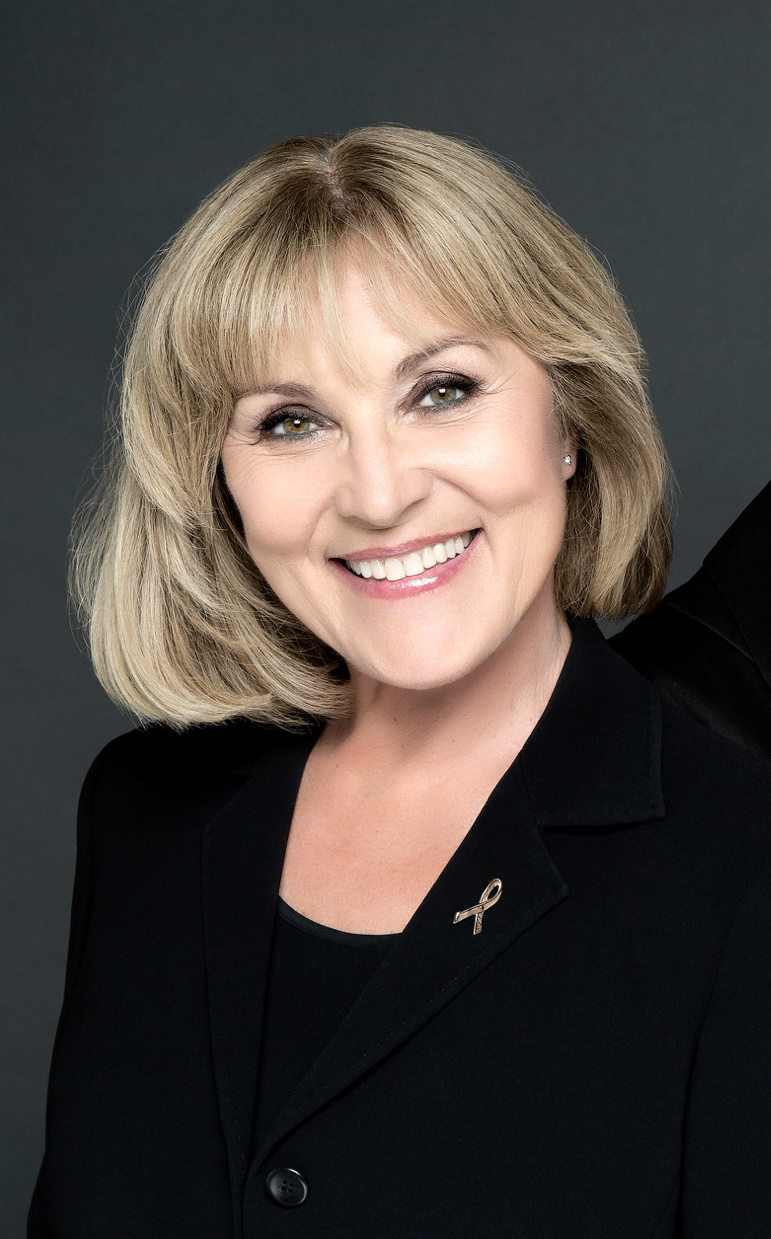
- Born: Lise Wold; 17 November 1938 (age 87); Frederiksberg, Denmark
- Years active: 1958–1985, 2012–present
- Spouse: Bent Mejding (m. 1983; died 2024)

Susse Wold (born 17 November 1938) is a Danish actress whose career has spanned five decades. Born Lise Wold in Denmark, she is the daughter of actress Marguerite Viby. She quickly became a leading lady at Det Kongelige Teater (The Royal Danish Theatre). In addition to her many TV, film and stage roles, Wold has toured the world reading H. C. Andersen's works. She was married to the Danish actor Bent Mejding. After a hiatus, she has appeared in The Hunt in 2012.

Wold was also a singer who (mostly in duo with Peter Sørensen) released more than a dozen albums and even more singles on the record labels Tono, Sonet Records and Pool Records, starting in 1959 and ending in the early 1990s.

== Career highlights ==
- Matador, an acclaimed Danish TV series about a small city in Denmark during the 1930s and 1940s with all the accompanying drama of the occupation by neighboring Nazi Germany.
- Knighted in the Order of the Dannebrog by Queen Margrethe II of Denmark.
- Won the Tagea Brandt Rejselegat (Travel Award) in 1969.
