= Ulla Henningsen =

Danish actress and singer

Ulla Henningsen (born 7 March 1951, Kalundborg) is a Danish actress and singer. She gained popularity in the late 1970s when she appeared in the popular television series Matador. As a stage performer, Henningsen has appeared in classical and modern roles in Copenhagen theatres including Betty Nansen Teatret and the Royal Danish Theatre. As a singer, she performed the leading role in the Danish television series Kald mig Liva.

== Early life and education ==
Born on 7 March 1951 in Kalundborg, Ulla Henningsen was the daughter of the lawyer Carl Henning Henningson and his wife Anna Lise née Christensen, a bookseller. When 15, she was inspired by a performance of the opera Tannhäuser while on a trip to Germany with her sisters. She later studied drama at the student school of the Aarhus Theatre from 1970 to 1972.

== Career ==
On completing drama school, Henningsen remained with Aarhus Theatre until 1977, gaining attention for her roles in the plays of Bertolt Brecht including Grusha in The Caucasian Chalk Circle and Jenny in Rise and Fall of the City of Mahagonny. She also performed in several musicals including Cabaret in 1976.

From 1977, Henningsen took many leading roles in the theatres of Copenhagen. At the Betty Nansen Theatre she performed in Molière's Tartuffe and Jean Anouilh's Den dobbelte kærlighed. She performed the role of Iben Skjold Hansen in the highly successful television series Matador (1978–82) and went on to take a singing role in the miniseries Kalk mig Liva in 1992.

In 2023 in Musikhuset, Aarhus, Henningsen played the title role in the musical Margrethe.

== Awards ==
In 2001 and 2011, Henningsen received Reumert Awards respectively for best supporting actress and best actress.
