= Lise Nørgaard =

Danish journalist and writer (1917–2023)

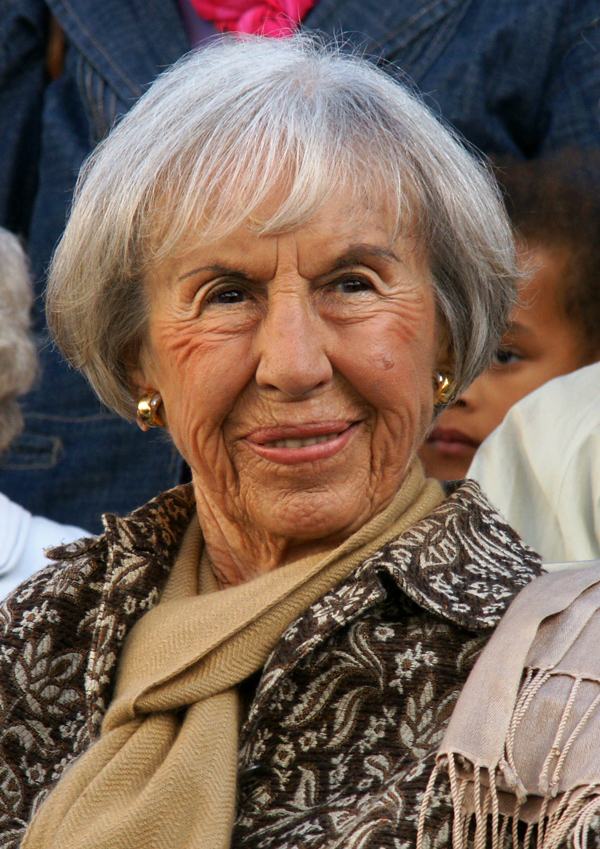
- Nørgaard in 2010
- Born: Elise Jensen; 14 June 1917; Roskilde, Denmark
- Died: 1 January 2023 (aged 105); Humlebæk, Denmark
- Occupations: Novelist, screenwriter, journalist
- Writing career
- Notable work: Matador

Lise Nørgaard (born Elise Jensen; 14 June 1917 – 1 January 2023) was a Danish journalist and writer known for her precise and often humorous portrayals of Danish cultural life. Nørgaard wrote novels, compilations of essays and short stories. The memoir of her childhood, Kun en pige (Only a girl), became a bestseller in 1992 and is considered her masterpiece. The work was adapted into a feature film in 1995.

== Life and career ==
Nørgaard became a journalist for the Politiken newspaper in 1949 where she wrote about household and women's issues. In 1968, she worked at the Hjemmet weekly magazine, serving as managing editor from 1975 to 1977. Her columns for the magazine became popular for their critical and humorous insight into Danish life.

From 1978 to 1982, Nørgaard created and co-wrote the television series Matador. The series, which focused on typical Danish characters living in the fictional town of Korsbæk between 1929 and 1947, became the most successful TV program in Danish history.

Among her honors, in 1982, Nørgaard was awarded the literary achievement award Publicistprisen from the National Press Club of Denmark. In 1992, she received the De gyldne Laurbær (The Golden Laurel) as Danish writer of the year. In 1994, Nørgaard was awarded knighthood in the Order of the Dannebrog. She turned 100 years old on 14 June 2017.

Nørgaard died peacefully in her sleep on 1 January 2023, at the age of 105.

== Selected bibliography ==
=== Books ===
- Med mor bag rattet, (Gyldendal 1959).
- Volmer - portræt af en samfundsstøtte, (Gyldendal 1970).
- Julen er hjerternes fest, Short stories, (Gyldendal 1978).
- Stjernevej, (Gyldendal 1981).
- Mig og farmor, Noveller, (Husets publishing, 1984).
- Sorte syvlinger, (Spectator 1961).
- Jo mere vi er sammen, (Rhodos 1966).
- En hund i huset, (Lindhardt og Ringhof 1980).
- Jeg gik mig over sø og land, essays, (Fisker 1988).
- Historien om Matador, (Danmarks Radio 1984).
- Syv små hunde og deres skæbne, (Fisker 1991).
- Kun en pige, memoirs, part 1, (Gyldendal 1992).
- De sendte en dame, memoirs part 2, (Gyldendal 1997).

=== Scripts ===
- Huset på Christianshavn, television series (1970–1977)
- Mig og Mafiaen (1973)
- Mafiaen, det er osse mig (1974)
- Matador, television series (1978–1982)
