= Preben Harris =

Danish actor (born 1935)

- Born: 30 March 1935 (age 90); Frederiksberg, Denmark

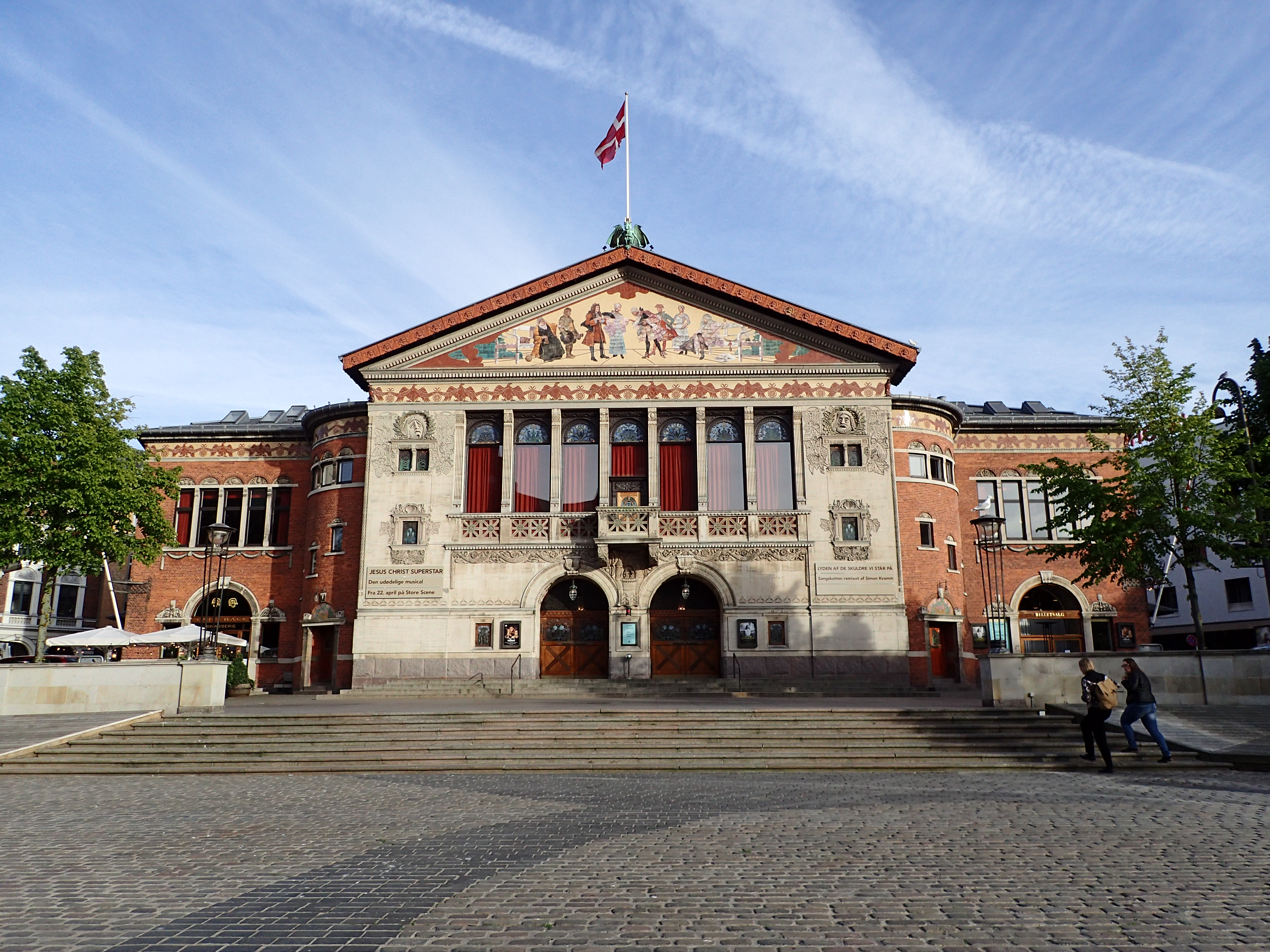
Harris joined the Aarhus Theater in 1957

Preben Harris (born 30 March 1935) is a Danish film and stage actor.

Harris joined the Aarhus Theater in 1957 and worked in the Cinema of Denmark from 1964.

He played Borgmester Sejersen in Matador.

== Selected filmography ==
- Måske i morgen – 1964
- Blind makker – 1976
- The Double Man – 1976
- Lille spejl – 1978
- Operation Cobra – 1995
- I Kina spiser de hunde – 1999
- Bornholms stemme – 1999
- At kende sandheden – 2002
- Til højre ved den gule hund – 2003
