= Bodil Award for Best Screenplay =

Annual Danish film award

The Bodil Award for Best Screenplay is a film award established in 2015 by the Danish Film Critics Association in collaboration with the Danish Writers Guild for the best screenplay that was handed out for the first time as an external award at the 68th Bodil Awards-ceremony.

== Recipients ==
- 2015: Christian Torpe for Silent Heart
- 2016: May el-Toukhy and Maren Louise Käehne for Long Story Short
- 2017: Christian Tafdrup for Parents
- 2018: Fenar Ahmad and Adam August for Darkland
- 2019: Jakob Weis for That Time of Year
- 2020: René Frelle Petersen for Uncle
- 2021: Thomas Vinterberg and Tobias Lindholm for Another Round
- 2022: Maya Ilsøe, Jesper Fink and Charlotte Sieling for Margrete: Queen of the North

== See also ==
- Robert Award for Best Screenplay
