= 68th Bodil Awards =

2015 Danish film awards ceremony

- Date: 28 February 2015
- Site: Bremen Theatre, Copenhagen
- Hosted by: Troels Lyby
- Organized by: Danish Film Critics Association

Highlights
- Best Film: Silent Heart
- Bodil Honorary Award: Viggo Mortensen
- Best Actor: Henrik Birch; The Sunfish
- Best Actress: Danica Curcic; Silent Heart
- Most awards: Silent Heart (4)
- Most nominations: Silent Heart (5) / Speed Walking (5)

The 68th Bodil Awards were held on 28 February 2015 in the Bremen Theater in Copenhagen, Denmark, honouring the best national and foreign films of 2014.

On 4 February 2015 it was announced that Danish American actor Viggo Mortensen would receive the 2015 Bodil Honorary Award.

Silent Heart directed by Bille August became the big winner at the Awards: It won the Best Danish Film Award, Augusts's third, and 27 years since he won his second Bodil for Pelle the Conqueror in 1988. 29-year-old Danica Curcic won her first Bodil Award for Best Actress in a Leading Role as little sister Sanne in the film, while Pilou Asbæk took home his second Bodil statuette for Best Actor in a Supporting Role as Sanne's hash fuming boyfriend. Danish Film Critics Association in collaboration with the Danish Writers Guild had instituted a new award for Best Screenplay, which went to Christian Torpe also for Silent Heart.

== Winners and nominees ==
Winners in bold

=== Best Danish Film ===
- **Silent Heart**
  - All Inclusive
  - Speed Walking
  - The Sunfish
  - When Animals Dream

=== Best Actor in a Leading Role ===
- **Henrik Birch** – The Sunfish
  - Villads Bøye – Speed Walking
  - Uffe Rørbæk Madsen - In Real Life
  - Mikael Persbrandt – Someone You Love

=== Best Actress in a Leading Role ===
- **Danica Curcic** – Silent Heart
  - Bodil Jørgensen – All Inclusive
  - Ghita Nørby – Silent Heart
  - Paprika Steen – Silent Heart
  - Sonia Suhl – When Animals Dream

=== Best Actor in a Supporting Role ===
- **Pilou Asbæk** – Silent Heart
  - Anders W. Berthelsen – Speed Walking
  - David Dencik – Speed Walking
  - Lars Mikkelsen – When Animals Dream
  - Ali Sivandi – Flow

=== Best Actress in a Supporting Role ===
- **Susanne Storm** – The Sunfish
  - Sarah-Sofie Boussnina – The Absent One
  - Danica Curcic – The Absent One
  - Sidse Babett Knudsen – Speed Walking
  - Birgitte Hjort Sørensen – Someone You Love

=== Best American Film ===
- **Boyhood**
  - Her
  - Inside Llewyn Davis
  - Dallas Buyers Club
  - Nebraska

=== Best Non-American Film ===
- **Force Majeure**
  - Winter Sleep
  - Ida
  - Two Days, One Night
  - The Past

=== Best Documentary ===
- **The Look of Silence**
  - The Circus Dynasty
  - 1989
  - The Arms Drop
  - We Are Journalists

== Recipients ==
=== Cinematographer ===
- Niels Thastum for When Animals Dream

=== Henning Bahs Award ===
- Rie Lykke for Speed Walking

=== Best Screenplay ===
- Christian Torpe for Silent Heart

=== Special Award ===
- Molly Malene Stensgaard, film editor, for editing Nymphomaniac and Nymphomaniac Director's Cut

=== Honorary Award ===
- Viggo Mortensen

== See also ==
- 2015 Robert Awards
