= Warrior (miniseries) =

2018 Danish television miniseries

- Genre: Action crime drama
- Created by: Christoffer Boe
- Starring: Dar Salim; Danica Curcic; Lars Ranthe
- Country of origin: Denmark
- Original language: Danish
- No. of seasons: 1
- No. of episodes: 6

Production
- Production companies: Miso Film; Public Service Puljen

Original release
- Network: TV 2
- Release: October 8, 2018

Warrior (Danish: Kriger) is a six-part 2018 Danish-language miniseries created by Christoffer Boe and starring Dar Salim, Danica Curcic and Lars Ranthe. The plot revolves around war veterans, bikers and the police force in a burgeoning turf war brewing between rival organized crime gangs. Copenhagen's police detective Louise (Danica Curcic) asks the war veteran CC (Dar Salim) to infiltrate the biker gang the Wolves.

It was released on October 8, 2018, on TV 2.

== Cast ==
- Dar Salim as CC
- Danica Curcic as Louise
- Lars Ranthe as Tom
- Jakob Oftebro as Peter
- Søren Malling as Finn
- Marco Ilsø as Mads
- Jens Ferdinand Holmberg as Max
- Steffen Brink Jensen as Påfuglen
- Kenneth M. Christensen as Røde
- Jan Brandi as MK
- Niclas Patrick Bonfils as Mik
- Kasper Leisner as Henrik
- Karina Fogh Holmkjær as Joy
- Jens Erik Meier as Biker
- Natalie Madueño as Camilia

== Release ==
Warrior was released on TV 2 on October 8, 2018.
