= Below the Surface (TV series) =

- Also known as: Gidseltagningen; Countdown Copenhagen
- Genre: Nordic Noir
- Created by: Kasper Barfoed
- Written by: Per Daumiller; Michael W. Horsten; Astrid Øye
- Directed by: Christian E. Christiansen; Roni Ezra; Kasper Barfoed
- Starring: Johannes Lassen; Alexandre Willaume; Peder Thomas Pedersen; Flemming Enevold; Esben Dalgaard Andersen; Kenneth M. Christensen; Henning Jensen; Paprika Steen; Sara Hjort Ditlevsen; Alba August; Sus Wilkins; Tommy Kenter; Anders Nyborg; Allan Hyde; Yasmin Mahmoud
- Composer: Jeppe Kaas
- Country of origin: Denmark
- Original language: Danish
- No. of seasons: 2
- No. of episodes: 16

Production
- Executive producers: Nina Bisgaard; Søren Sveistrup; Adam Price; Meta Foldager Sørensen
- Producer: Morten Kjems Juhl
- Cinematography: Niels A. Hansen; Ian Hansen
- Editors: Benjamin Binderup; Morten Egholm
- Running time: 44 min
- Production company: SAM Productions

Original release
- Network: Kanal 5 (Denmark)
- Release: 2 April 2017 – 14 May 2019

Below the Surface (Danish: Gidseltagningen) is a Danish action hostage thriller drama television series, written and directed by Kasper Barfoed, that was based upon an idea of Adam Price and Søren Sveistrup. The first eight-part series focuses on an act of terrorism committed on the Copenhagen Metro, where fifteen people are taken hostage. Former soldier Philip Nørgaard (Johannes Lassen), who is head of the PET Terror Task Force (TTF), tries to save the hostages with help from members of his elite team. TTF members are portrayed by Sara Hjort Ditlevsen, Alexandre Willaume, Flemming Enevold, Esben Dalgaard Andersen, Peder Thomas Pedersen and Kenneth M. Christensen.

The basis for the series was adapted from a series of conversations between Barfoed and Danish photographer Daniel Rye, who lived as a hostage within the terrorist organisation of Islamic State in Syria for more than a year. In Germany, the series is known as Countdown Kopenhagen.

On 2 April 2017, the series premiered in Denmark on Kanal 5, and was released on DVD in Germany on 19 October 2017. In the United Kingdom, BBC4 broadcast the first four episodes during March 2018. The BBC pulled the series from their schedule for 24 March only following the terrorist attack in Carcassonne and continued on 31 March. The second season premiered on 26 March 2019 in Denmark. Lassen and his cast mates, except Ditlevsen, reprise their roles as TTF members, which deal with the Elsinore–Helsingborg ferry hijacking by four Islamic terrorists. Hijackers are after foreign fighter June al-Baqee (Yasmin Mahmoud) with Philip as a fellow passenger-hostage.

== Plot summary ==
In Series 1, 15 people are held hostage in a subway train. A police terror taskforce led by former-Jaeger Corps soldier Philip Norgaard (Johannes Lassen) and Louise Falk (Sara Hjort Ditlevsen) is dispatched to rescue them. Meanwhile, reporter Naja Toft (Paprika Steen) acts as a go-between with the hostages and police. As the media frenzy takes hold, the country becomes divided on whether to negotiate with the terrorists or not.

In Series 2, anti-ISIS fighter June al-Baqee (Yasmin Mahmoud) is kidnapped after alerting Philip that Danish soldiers were killed in Syria. Despite being on leave from work, Philip follows June onto a Sweden-bound ferry, where her kidnappers take passengers and crew hostage. Philip contacts the taskforce and updates them on the situation. The criminals order the ferry to stop, when they learn police await them in Sweden. June escapes and hides on board, while Philip tries to find her before the kidnappers do.

== Cast and characters ==
- Johannes Lassen as Philip Nørgaard: Henning's son, former Jaeger Corps soldier, held hostage by Islamic forces, becomes head of Danish Security and Intelligence Service (PET's) Terror Task Force (TTF); Louise's former love interest, becomes Beate's domestic partner
- Alexandre Willaume as "SP" (Steen Per) Byager: TTF member, leads major investigations
- Flemming Enevold as Hans Hejndorf: Danish Security and Intelligence Service (PET) Director General
- Esben Dalgaard Andersen as Esben Garnov: TTF negotiator, later leader
- Peder Thomas Pedersen as Simon Clausen: TTF member, generally works with SP
- Kenneth M. Christensen as Daniel Cramer: TTF member, lead strike force squads
- Kasper Leisner as Ebbe Moller: Ministry of Justice, minister's assistant, TTF liaison
- Henning Jensen as Henning Nørgaard: Philip's father, former Chief of Defense

=== Series one ===
- Sara Hjort Ditlevsen as Louise Falck: TTF member, Philip's former love interest, negotiator
- Paprika Steen as Naja Toft: TV news reporter
- Alba August as Marie Bendix: Aksel's daughter, trainee nurse, hostage
- Jakob Oftebro as Alpha/Mark Hald: former Jaeger Corps soldier, fellow hostage with Philip; leads train hostage-takers; kills himself
- Jacob Lohmann as Jonas/Ben: Jim's brother, hostage-taker's accomplice, poses as Leon's son
- Dar Salim as Adel Rasul: karate instructor, hostage, killed by hostage-takers
- Sus Wilkins as Denise Hansen: young mother, hostage
- Lane Lind as Bodil Pedersen: retired teacher, hostage, killed by hostage-takers
- Michael Asmussen as Joachim: wealthy businessman, hostage
- Tommy Kenter as Leon: retired worker, diabetic, hostage
- Anders Nyborg as Ricco: Leon's friend, hostage
- Adnan Hasković as Bravo: hostage-taker, killed by TTF squad
- Muhamed Hadžović as Charlie: hostage-taker, killed by TTF squad
- Allan Hyde as Silas Jensen: disc jockey, hostage
- Jesper Hyldegaard as Aksel Bendix: Marie's father
- Cecilie Stenspil as Anne Gornstein: National Police Commissioner
- Henrik Prip as Palle Wulff: Chief of Defense
- Hadi Ka-Koush as Ahmed Mahmoud: Afghan head guard, tortures Philip (only in flashbacks), believed killed in drone attack
- Jens Sætter-Lassen as Sammy: serving soldier, former member of Mark and Jim's squad
- Jesper Zuschlag as Jim: Ben's brother, held hostage with Philip and Mark, kills himself

=== Series two ===
- Yasmin Mahmoud as June al-Baqee: convicted foreign fighter: fought ISIS in Syria; kidnapped by Yusuf's team
- Ola Rapace as Yusuf a.k.a. Nikoloz Giorgadz: Georgian-born mercenary posing as a jihadist; leader of kidnappers, hostage-takers; hired by Anna
- Ali Sivandi as Rami Hadad: Mahdi's older brother, kidnapper, hostage-taker
- Søren Pilmark as Lars F. Bülow: Director General of Danish Defense Intelligence Service (FE)
- Søren Malling as Thomas Hvalsø: Elsinore–Helsingborg line ferry captain
- Anis Alobaidi as Mahdi Hadad: Rami's younger brother, Tahira's husband; kidnapper, hostage-taker
- Helle Fagralid as Beate Seitsø: Asger's mother, Philips's love interest; psychologist, treats PTSD clients
- Sebastian Bull as Hassan previously Frederick Sørensen: kidnapper, hostage-taker
- Lise Risom Olsen as Anna Kasharina: Russian cultural attaché, actually Russian Foreign Intelligence Service (SVR) agent
- Maibritt Saerens as Ine Frølich: Minister of Justice, orders June's prosecution
- Laura Christensen as Siri: ferry passenger, mother of baby Viola
- Elsebeth Steentoft as Herdis Krabbe: befriended by June
- Mads Riisom as Rene: Herdis's son-in-law
- Sandra Yi Sencindiver as Nina Sloth: TTF communications officer, works for Esben
- Bertil Smith as Asger Seitsø: Beate's son
- Julie Grundtvig Wester as Kiki: Peter and Beate's friend
- Kristian Halken as Olai: Kiki's dad, helps Peter renovate his boat
- Frederik Christian Johansen as Lauge: Kiki's friend, IT specialist
- Sandra El-Hussein as Tahira Hadad: Mahdi's wife
- Ramadan Huseini as SVR-Chauffør (English: SVR-Chauffeur): SVR agent, Anna's chauffeur-assassin
- Moussa Daibes as Abdul Bashir: Rami's imam
- Bo Carlsson as Hindborg: taskforce IT specialist, works for Simon and SP
- Zein Ali as Elias: Syria freedom fighter, worked with June, recorded video of Russians killing Danes
- Sarah Boberg as Inga Hvalsø: Thomas's wife
- Judith Rothenborg as Dagmar: passenger, hostage
- Fadime Turan as Kantinemedarbejder (English: canteen employee)/Zeynep Bilgin: ferry's cook
- Abud Mustafa as Rafiq Hussein: Abdul's henchman, Rami's associate
- Jannie Faurschou as Marianne Seitsø: Beate's mother
- Ditte Arnth as Dorthe: Herdis's daughter
- Jakob Femerling Andersen as Sune: ferry passenger
- Amany Turk as Junes Mor (English: June's mom)

== Episodes ==
=== Season one ===
| Episode | Title | Directed by | Written by | Viewers | Original Denmark airdate | BBC4 UK airdate | BBC4 Viewers |
|---|---|---|---|---|---|---|---|
| 1 | "Episode 1" | Kasper Barfoed | Kasper Barfoed | 211,000 | 2 April 2017 | 10 March 2018 | |
In Copenhagen, a Metro train is hijacked by three armed men wearing balaclavas, and fifteen passengers on board are taken hostage. Philip Nørgaard, head of the PET Terror Task Force, is assigned to the case. The attackers demand €4 million in ransom money for the fifteen hostages to be freed. They agree for one of the hostages, Marie Bendix, to take part in a live television interview with journalist Naja Toft.
| 2 | "Episode 2" | Kasper Barfoed | Astrid Øye | 211,000 | 2 April 2017 | 10 March 2018 | |
Naja is fired by the network, but the attackers are keen to keep her as their sole line of communication to the outside world. They set up a second live interview, this time on Naja's recently established blog. Philip raises a concern that the interview may in fact be a smokescreen for a live execution, and makes preparations to declare the area a 'dead zone' in order to block all transmissions signals, if necessary.
| 3 | "Episode 3" | Christian E. Christiansen | Lars Kristian Andersen | 166,000 | 9 April 2017 | 17 March 2018 | |
The attackers try to arrange another interview with Naja, but when Leon, one of the hostages, is taken ill, they are forced to call for help. Philip seizes the chance to organise a raid and sends in two teams, each containing a sharpshooter, on opposing sides of the tunnel. However, little do they realise that the tunnel has been booby trapped, and in the ensuing firefight, one of the hostages is shot by the police.
| 4 | "Episode 4" | Christian E. Christiansen | Per Daumiller | 157,000 | 16 April 2017 | 17 March 2018 | |
Silas provides the team with information that suggests that one of the attackers may have a military connection. Relations between the attackers turn sour when one of the hostages is sexually assaulted. SP goes in search of the gang who reportedly sold the guns to the attackers. Naja finds an ally in Leon's son, unaware that he is secretly working for the attackers. Philip opens up to Louise about his ordeal.
| 5 | "Episode 5" | Christian E. Christiansen | Michael W. Horsten | 134,000 | 23 April 2017 | 31 March 2018 | |
Philip is left stunned when the team uncover a lockup garage connected with the attackers which has pictures of him plastered all over the wall. Naja agrees to another interview, which she agrees to let Philip sit in on, but is shocked to discover that Leon's son is not who he claims to be. Joachim decides to hatch a plan to free himself and the other hostages, but the plan goes disastorously wrong.
| 6 | "Episode 6" | Roni Ezra | Per Daumiller | 151,000 | 30 April 2017 | 31 March 2018 | |
In an attempt to force the attackers' hand, Philip decides to cut power to the tunnel. After a surge in donations to the fundrasier following Bodil's death, Naja alerts Louise that she is in danger, and Jonas is arrested and brought in for questioning. The death of his brother in a military strike provides the team with a new line of investigation, and Louise's voice analysis of samples taken from his platoon, K7, reveals a possible identity for one of the attackers.
| 7 | "Episode 7" | Roni Ezra | Michael W. Horsten | 145,000 | 7 May 2017 | 7 April 2018 | |
| 8 | "Episode 8" | Roni Ezra | Per Daumiller | 142,000 | 14 May 2017 | 7 April 2018 | |

=== Season two ===
| No. overall | No. in season | Title | Directed by | Written by | Original release date |
|---|---|---|---|---|---|
| 9 | 1 | "Episode 1" (Afsnit 1) | Christian E. Christiansen | Jesper Bernt, Lasse Kyed Rasmussen, Eske Troelstrup | 25 March 2019 |
Flashback: In Syria, June runs from soldiers with Elias's mobile phone. Phone's video depicts Russians killing Danes. Present: In Copenhagen, Philip and Beate have sex. June asks her lawyer to drive to Philip. Hassan follows lawyer's car. Philip, Beate and Asger return from shopping. Hassan parks behind lawyer. June tells Philip of her video. Philip cannot open June's email attachment. Asger tells Philip how kidnappers took June. Philip follows Hassan to hotel carpark. Kidnappers transfer June to Mahdi's car. Philip phones SP. Herdis, Rene and Dorthe see news report on June. SP checks Hassan's car. Simon provides CCTV of Mahdi's car. Lars takes over investigation. Lars contacts Russian embassy. June runs off while on toilet break; gets into passing car. Yusuf kills driver and recaptures June. Henning meets Beate's family. Asger heard kidnapper named Mahdi. Flashback: Philip speaks to university students; meets June. Present: Philip gets Mahdi's phone number from Tahira. Anna to Lars: not involved in June's kidnapping. Lars: June cannot be killed in Denmark. Lauge and Kiki trace Mahdi for Philip. Yusuf ordered to take June to Sweden. Hassan drives towards ferry. Kiki drives Philip, following Mahdi. Beate tells Henning that Philip's leaving taskforce. Philip boards ferry.
| 10 | 2 | "Episode 2" (Afsnit 2) | Christian E. Christiansen | Jesper Bernt, Lasse Kyed Rasmussen, Eske Troelstrup | 1 April 2019 |
June, inside Mahdi's car boot, views ferry's cargo hold. Asger tells Beate about kidnappers. Philip sees Rami leave Mahdi's car. Later Rami sits with Yusuf and Hassan. June chokes Mahdi, stabs him and exits car. Mahdi confirms June escaped. Dorthe sees Herdis reading news about June. Rami removes knife from Mahdi's shoulder. Kidnappers arm themselves and search for June. Lauge and Kiki tell Beate how Philip left on Swedish ferry. June hides under tarp on flatbed truck. Philip enters bridge and apprises Thomas of June's kidnapping: she's hiding from four armed men. Thomas presses security alarm for Swedish police. Russian agent warns of alarm's activation. Flashback: Philip, as a client, attends Beate's therapy session. Philip straightens Asger's dislocated finger. Present: Philip returns to cafeteria. Computer messages Rafiq, who updates Abdul. Yusuf cautions Rami: no payment without June. Yusuf orders team to check for June when ferry docks. June convinces truck's owner to let her keep hidden. Anna updates Yusuf on security alert. Yusuf decides to hijack ferry. Philip attacks Yusuf in the cafeteria but is knocked down by Rami. Yusuf and Mahdi break into bridge; aim weapons at Thomas and crewman. Mahdi kills crewman. Thomas reverses ferry away from Helsingborg.
| 11 | 3 | "Episode 3" (Afsnit 3) | Christian E. Christiansen | Jesper Bernt, Lasse Kyed Rasmussen, Eske Troelstrup | 8 April 2019 |
Passenger live-streams Hassan ordering hostages to exit vehicles. Hans directs Esben to start negotiations. Mahdi disallows Thomas answering ship's phone. Yusuf's team corrals passengers into lounge. Rami orders Zeynep to fry hostages' phones. Simon and SP note Hassan driving Mahdi's car onto ferry; linked to June's kidnapping. Hans notifies Lars of ferry's hijacking. Sune reveals to Yusuf that June was on flatbed. Yusuf and Rami escort Sune to cargo bay. June sneaks upstairs. Thomas distracts Mahdi from monitors by treating his wound. Herdis learns of ferry's hijacking. Mahdi orders Thomas to stop ferry in mid-Øresund strait. Philip sees June sneaking past. Tahira verifies Mahdi's car to SP; provides Mahdi's phone number but does not recognise Hassan. Yusuf and Rami bring Sune onto bridge. Yusuf answers ship's phone. Nina alerts Esben. Yusuf warns Esben not to approach ferry, claims they are Islamic terrorists. Abdul barters for poison gas cylinders. Yusuf kills Sune when June refuses to surrender. Esben outlines scenarios to tackle hijackers. Hvalsø updates Philip on bridge's status. Philip tells Yusuf he is June's former teacher. Yusuf threatens to kill Siri and Viola. June disables Hassan; briefly frees hostages but surrenders when confronted by Philip and Siri held at gunpoint.
| 12 | 4 | "Episode 4" (Afsnit 4) | Christian E. Christiansen | Jesper Bernt, Lasse Kyed Rasmussen, Eske Troelstrup | 15 April 2019 |
Esben recalls TTF drone when Yusuf threatens to execute hostages. Ebbe contacts Ine to decide on scenario to rescue hostages. Tahira describes Rami's extremist influence on Mahdi. Rami lived at home-based mosque. Thomas asks Mahdi for food and water. Philip's held in ship's freezer; breaks his cable ties. Yusuf tortures June to reveal phone's location. Rami orders Zeynep to cook food. SP and Simon enter Rami's apartment; find explosives. June writes Inga's phone number. Flashback Philip confesses to Beate how he was broken when a hostage. Present: Hindborg identifies Abdul's video calling for jihad, which shows Rami. Hans alerts Ine to Islamist's threat; she approves of taskforce attacking hijackers. Beate updates SP and Simon about Philip's presence on ferry. Anna lies to Lars that hijackers are unknown. Daniel leads attack squad but Hassan spots them approaching. Rami shoves June in with Philip. Rami kills Zeynep. Yusuf and Hassan strap bomb vests onto six passengers. Daniel's squad boards ferry; they kill Hassan. Bomb vests explode killing hostages and squad members. Yusuf warns squad to leave or all hostages will be killed. Hans orders Daniel's squad to abort rescue mission without finding Philip. Russian agent attacks Inga; gives phone to Anna.
| 13 | 5 | "Episode 5" (Afsnit 5) | Mogens Hagedorn | Jesper Bernt, Lasse Kyed Rasmussen, Lars Christian Detlefsen | 22 April 2019 |
Russian IT Agent unlocks phone; Anna tells Yusuf: wrong phone. Rami douses June and Philip with cold water, turns freezer to lowest setting. Rami and Mahdi prepare Hassan and Zeynep's bodies. Herdis asks Rene to recharge June's phone. Mahdi brings food for hostages in shipping container. Nina spots Rafiq entering Rami's apartment; Rafiq's arrested. Anna questions June's lawyer. Hans asks Beate to debrief Daniel's team. Flashback: June meets Herdis aboard aeroplane. Present: Rene asks Herdis about June's phone. Rafiq denies owning explosives or knowing Rami. Anna and Chauffeur check Beate's home; take Philip's laptop. Rami phones Rafiq: requests help from Abdul. Nina identifies Hassan. Anna reveals Philip's identity to Yusuf, who confirms Philip's on ferry. Rafiq verifies that Hassan converted to Islam. Yusuf's arrival led to greater radicalisation. Yusuf organised June's kidnapping to generate money for poison gas. Rami and Mahdi revive Philip from freezer. Hans relieves Esben of duties. Yusuf tortures Philip. Anna and Yusuf discover June's number; Herdis answers. IT Agent tracks June's phone to Herdis's address. Rami orders Mahdi to kill Philip and June. Philip tries to convince Madhi to spare them. Madhi videos shooting of masked people. Beate meets Inga. Madhi throws corpses overboard.
| 14 | 6 | "Episode 6" (Afsnit 6) | Mogens Hagedorn | Jesper Bernt, Lasse Kyed Rasmussen, Per Daumiller | 29 April 2019 |
Passengers suffer from confinement; Dagmar collapses, dies. Mahdi posts video on jihadist website; Hans informs Beate. Yusuf contacts Esben on Philip's phone; Yusuf's surprised when Esben mentions executions. Yusuf informs Anna of Rami's action; Anna abandons Yusuf. Philip explains how Mahdi saved them. Rene asks Herdis to take June's phone to police. Nina identifies corpses: Hassan and Zeynep. Yusuf demands fuelled plane; Esben asks for proof of life. Nina informs Beate that Philip's alive. Philip phones Beate via bridge computer. Philip briefs Hans that June kidnapped due to phone's video, which she gave to Herdis. SP and Simon search June's room; her computer has military intelligence bug. Philip discovers hostages' container. June sees engineer, Levinsen. Philip uses oxy-fuel burner to open hole in container's roof. Levinsen uses gas to knock out Rami but Mahdi saves Rami. Philip contacts TTF; organises to divert ferry to Prøvestenen and trap hijackers on narrow bridge. Lars denies bugging June's computer. Esben tells Yusuf they have plane ready. Philip alerts Thomas to divert ferry. Beate and Inga report their respective break-ins to SP. Nina's found Herdis's address. Herdis decides to take June's phone to her mother. Yusuf opens container to collect Thomas. Yusuf opens another case of bombs.
| 15 | 7 | "Episode 7" (Afsnit 7) | Mogens Hagedorn | Jesper Bernt, Lasse Kyed Rasmussen, Per Daumiller | 6 May 2019 |
Anna and Chauffeur search Herdis's home for June's phone. Simon sets squad to ambush kidnappers. Philip and June look for Levinsen to empty fuel tanks. SP and Simon arrive at Herdis's place; they find Herdis restrained. She describes two attackers. Yusuf directs Thomas to Kastrup. Herdis admits to meeting June on plane flight. SP and Simon chase after Chauffeur; leave Herdis. Rene drives truck. Chauffeur stops Rene but SP wounds Chauffeur who escapes. Levinsen's dead; June and Philip empty tanks themselves. Anna and Chauffeur separate. Thomas alerts Yusuf to empty fuel tanks; convinces Yusuf to turn to Prøvestenen. Rene picks up Herdis on sidetrack. Hans formally reinstates Philip to active duty. Yusuf warns Esben of bombs in container with hostages. Philip drills holes in container's roof. Ferry approaches Prøvestenen dock. Rami wants to collect Hassan's corpse. Rami realises Mahdi tricked him about killing June and Philip. Hans updates Lars on search for June's phone and role of Russian agents. Yusuf has Thomas drive truck with container. Rami shoots Mahdi, who ran for the dock. June knocks down Rami. Thomas starts driving as Philip enters container. He disarms five bombs. Sniper kills Yusuf; hostages are freed. June runs after Rami.
| 16 | 8 | "Episode 8" (Afsnit 8) | Mogens Hagedorn | Jesper Bernt, Lasse Kyed Rasmussen, Per Daumiller | 16 May 2019 |
Philip follows June and Rami. June wounds Rami; she drags Rami into factory room, which she locks. June demands her phone back. Hans allows Philip to negotiate with June while Simon prepares squad. Lars covered up video's content, which would deteriorate Danish-Russian relationships and his position as military intelligence chief. Russian Agent and Anna hear as Herdis hands over June's phone. Airport CCTV show Anna and Chauffeur near June, when arrested. Philip injures June but protects her from Rami and squad. Rami shot by squad. SP and Simon see photo of Chauffeur driving Yusuf. June's mother tells Herdis that June's alive. Lars identifies Anna as Russian diplomat. Herdis hands June's phone back. Lars shows Anna photos of her agents. June hands Philip her phone. SP and Simon enter Anna's hideout. Lars transfers June to Russian authorities. Philip asks Lauge to copy June's video. Hans updates Ebbe on Anna and Yusuf's links. Ebbe informs Hans that Anna's taking June to Russia. Philip confronts Lars: Philip will release video unless June stays in Denmark. Philip hands phone to Anna; escorts June off plane. Beate and family reunite with Philip. Philip authorises Lauge to release June's video. Russians claim video was faked.

== Filming ==
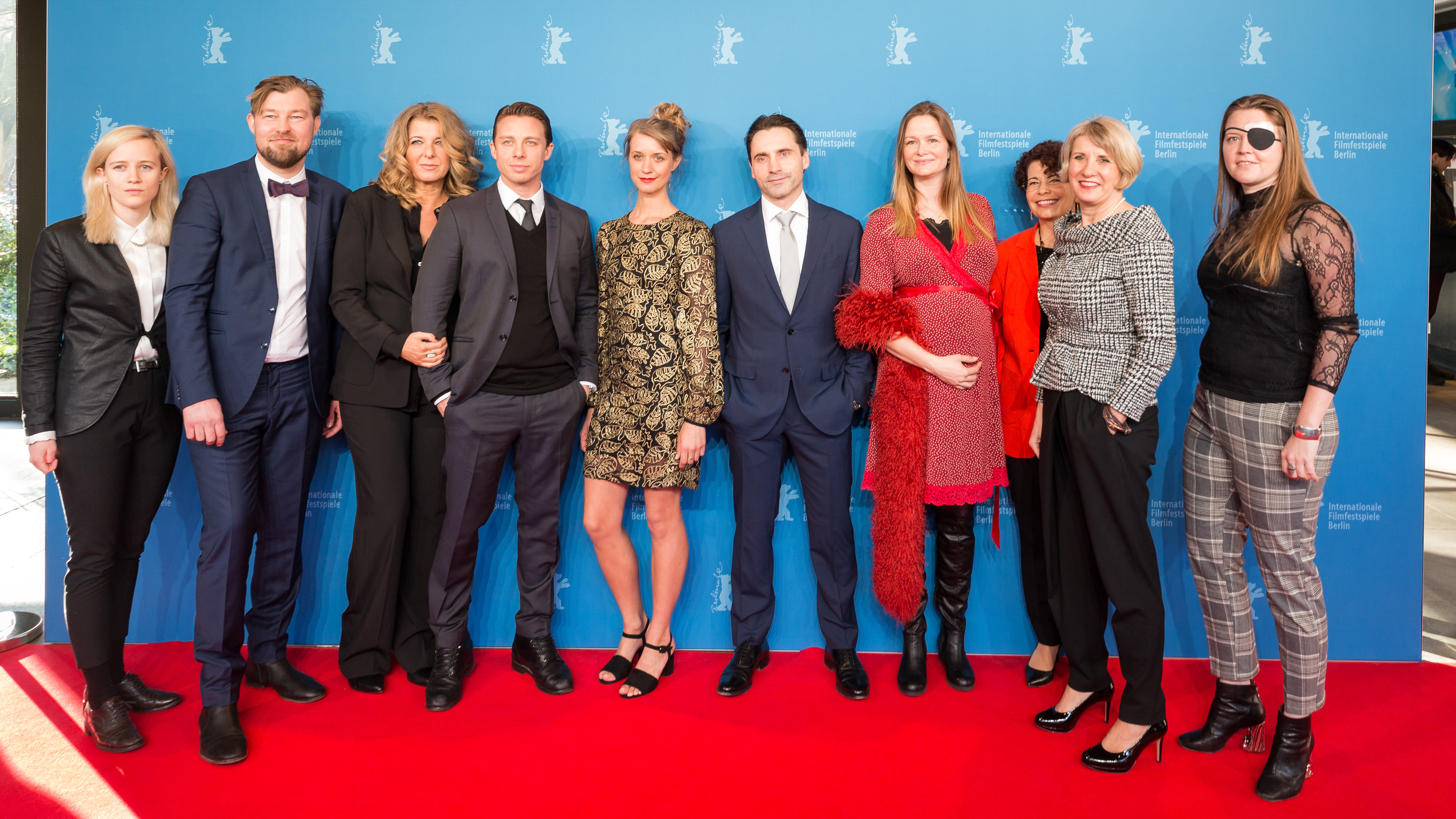
The filming team of Below the Surface at the 67th Berlin International Film Festival

The team responsible for filming the series attended the 67th Berlin International Film Festival, where the series was promoted prior to the broadcast of the first episode.

== See also ==
- List of Danish television series
