= Hamptons International Film Festival =

Annual film festival held in East Hampton, New York, US

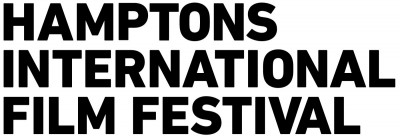
- Location: The Hamptons, New York, United States
- Founded: 1992
- Awards: Golden Starfish Award; Audience Award; Zelda Penzel "Giving Voice to the Voiceless" Award; Victor Rabinowitz & Joanne Grant Award for Social Justice; Tangerine Entertainment Juice Award; Views From Long Island Award; Brizzolara Family Foundation Award; Alfred P. Sloan Feature Film Award
- Festival date: October
- Website: hamptonsfilmfest.org

The Hamptons International Film Festival (HIFF) is an international film festival founded in 1992, by Joyce Robinson. The festival has since taken place every year in East Hampton, New York. It is usually an annual eleven-day event in mid-October and is held in theatre venues located in the Long Island area of New York, United States. Approximately 18,000 visitors attend each festival and close to a hundred films are featured each year, including an annual representation of at least twenty countries and an awards package worth over $200,000. HIFF was founded as a celebration of independent film in a variety of forms, and to provide a forum for independent filmmakers with differing global perspectives. The festival places a particular emphasis upon new filmmakers with a diversity of ideas, as a means to not only provide public exposure for festival content and its creators, but to also inspire and enlighten audiences. The festival has presented films that have subsequently been considered highly successful productions; the 2008 event featured eventual winners of the Academy Award, Golden Globe Award, and Independent Spirit Award "Best Picture" accolades, and the 2011 season consisted of 24 Academy Award nominations.

HIFF primarily showcases short films, documentaries and narrative films and is a qualifying festival for the Academy Awards. The festival offers special presentations, including: "Breakthrough Performers" showcasing new emerging acting talent; "A Conversation With", a Q&A session with a film luminary; and "Conflict & Resolution" which "utilizes the power of cinema to increase understanding of the human realities of war and conflict".

HIFF offers an awards package worth $165,000.

The festival is also involved with other events during the remainder of the year, including screenings in other parts of New York State and an annual Screenwriters Lab.

== Screenwriters Lab ==
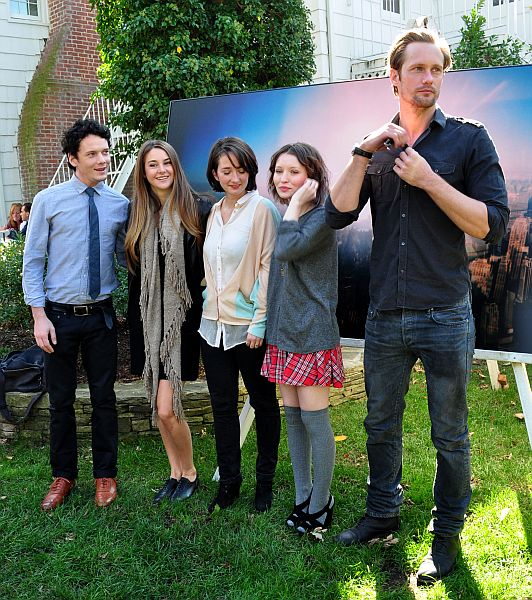
From left to right: Anton Yelchin, Shailene Woodley, Stine Fischer Christensen, Emily Browning, and Alexander Skarsgård at the 2011 Hamptons International Film Festival

The Hamptons Screenwriters' Lab is an intimate gathering that takes place each spring in East Hampton. The Lab seeks to develop new screenwriting talent by introducing established writers to emerging screenwriters, the latter having been chosen by the organizers of the film festival and key industry contacts. The mentors advise in a "one-on-one" laboratory setting, whilst scheduled daily events allow participants to engage with board members, sponsors, the local creative community and other festival supporters. The Lab facilitates the improvement of participating screenwriters' work, as the selected writers consult with industry professionals to attain insight into the mechanisms of the film industry.

The Lab actively seeks a broad selection of screenplays that cumulatively address a diversity of subject matter. The Lab also encourages the submission of fresh, innovative screenplays that explore science, technology, mathematics, invention and engineering as part of its partnership with The Alfred P. Sloan Foundation's initiative to further the public understanding of science.
