= The Peasant =

- Directed by: Dev Patel
- Screenplay by: Will Dunn; Dev Patel
- Story by: Will Dunn
- Produced by: Dev Patel; Basil Iwanyk; Erica Lee; Charlie Morisson
- Starring: Dev Patel; Christian Friedel; Sebastian Bull; Saurabh Sachdeva; Anasuya Sengupta; Vipin Sharma
- Production companies: Fifth Season; Thunder Road; Minor Realm
- Distributed by: A24
- Countries: United States; India

The Peasant is an upcoming action thriller film directed by Dev Patel from a screenplay he co-wrote with Will Dunn. Production wrapped in May 2026.

== Premise ==
Set in the 1300s, it centers on a shepherd who embarks on a rage-fueled campaign against a group of mercenary knights who ransacked his community, revealing himself to be more than he seems.

== Cast ==
- Dev Patel
- Christian Friedel
- Sebastian Bull
- Saurabh Sachdeva
- Anasuya Sengupta
- Vipin Sharma

== Production ==
Will Dunn wrote the spec script for The Peasant in 2023, and it was voted onto The Black List of the most popular unproduced screenplays at the end of the year. In April 2024, Fifth Season and Thunder Road acquired the rights to the script. In April 2025, it was announced that Dev Patel would direct and star in the project, reuniting Patel with Thunder Road who worked together on Patel's directorial debut Monkey Man. Patel would also re-write the script alongside Will Dunn, changing the setting from Italy to India.

In May 2025, A24 acquired the distribution rights. Production began early 2026 in India, across the states of Maharashtra, Madhya Pradesh, Himachal Pradesh and Rajasthan, and wrapped in May, with Christian Friedel, Sebastian Bull, Saurabh Sachdeva, Anasuya Sengupta and Vipin Sharma being announced to have been cast.
