= Robert Award for Best Short Fiction/Animation =

Danish film award

The Robert Award for Best Short Fiction/Animation (Danish: Robert Prisen for årets korte fiktion/animation) is one of the merit awards presented by the Danish Film Academy at the annual Robert Awards ceremony. The award has been handed out since 2006.

== Honorees ==
=== 2000s ===
- 2006: Lille Lise – Benjamin Holmsteen
- 2007: Partus – Mikkel Munch-Fals
- 2008: Boy Meets Girl – Søren Frellesen
- 2009: Cathrine – Mads Matthiesen

=== 2010s ===
- 2010: Megaheavy – Fenar Ahmad
- 2011: To venner – Paw Charlie Ravn
- 2012: Girl in the Water – Jeppe Rønde and Woo Ming Jin
- 2013: Dyret – Malene Choi
- 2014: 2 piger 1 kage – Jens Dahl
- 2015: Helium – Anders Walter and Kim Magnusson
- 2016: Mommy – Milad Alami
- 2017: SIA – Annika Berg
- 2018: Silent Nights – Aske Bang
- 2019: Maja – Marijana Jankovic
