= Valhalla (2019 film) =

- Directed by: Fenar Ahmad
- Written by: Fenar Ahmad; Adam August
- Based on: Valhalla by Peter Madsen
- Produced by: Jacob Jarek
- Starring: Roland Møller; Dulfi Al-Jabouri; Jakob Lohmann; Stine Fischer Christensen
- Cinematography: Kasper Tuxen
- Distributed by: Nordisk Film
- Release date: 10 October 2019
- Running time: 105 min
- Country: Denmark
- Language: Danish
- Budget: 34 million DKK (approximately 4.9 million DKK).

Valhalla is a 2019 Danish dark fantasy adventure film, directed by Fenar Ahmad, and based on the comic book of the same name ("Cry Wolf") by Peter Madsen, Hans Rancke-Madsen and Henning Kure.

The film was released on 10 October 2019, the same date as the original 1986 film.

== Summary ==
The Viking children Røskva and Tjalfe embark on an adventurous journey from Midgard to Valhalla with the gods Thor and Loki. Life in Valhalla, however, turns out to be threatened by the dreaded Fenrir wolf and the god's barbaric archenemies, the Jotnar. Side by side with the gods the two children must fight to save Valhalla from the end of the world - Ragnarok.

== Cast ==
- Cecilia Loffredo as Røskva
- Saxo Molthke-Leth as Tjalfe
- Roland Møller as Thor
- Dulfi Al-Jabouri as Loki
- Reza Forghani as Quark
- Stine Fischer Christensen as Frigg
- Jacob Ulrik Lohmann as Týr
- Asbjørn Krogh Nissen as Odin
- Ali Sivandi as Skrymer
- Uffe Lorentzen as Útgarða-Loki
- Andreas Jessen as Baldr
- Salóme R. Gunnarsdóttir as Freyja
- Lára Jóhanna Jónsdóttir as Sif
- Sanne Salomonsen as Elli
- Emma Rosenzweig as Jættedronningen
- Patricia Schumann as Mother
- Bjørn Fjæstad as Father

== Reception ==
The film received mixed to negative reviews. The newspaper B.T. gave it four out of six stars, as did soundvenue, which wrote that the film was " fryd for øjet" ("eye candy"). Writing for DR, Per Juul Carlsen gave four out of six stars and wrote that "i det store hele lykkedes Fenar Ahmad og co. at opdatere 'Valhalla' til 2019." ("overall, Fenar Ahmad and co. succeeded in updating 'Valhalla' for 2019."

Jacob Wendt Jensen of Jyllands-Posten and Kristian Lindberg of Berlingske gave it three out of six stars, writing gav tre ud af seks stjerner.

The most negative review from major Danish media agencies came out of Filmmagasinet Ekko and Politiken. Ekko gave it only two out of six stars as did Joakim Grundahl writing for Politiken, wrote in his review that the film was a "tyndbenet kulissefilm, der ikke kan bære tyngden af sin egen alvor", that it "ikke er [sic] en produktion, der kan måle sig med de internationale fantasyfilm, den efterligner. Og som arvtager til Peter Madsens og Henning Kures særlige nordiske tone, der ligger i forlængelse af den overleverede mytologi, skuffer den fælt." (English: "it is [sic] a skin and bones set piece film that is unable to bear the gravity of its own seriousness (...) it [sic] is not a production that is able to measure up to the international fantarsy films that it tries to repliate. Og som arvtager til Peter Madsens og Henning Kures særlige nordiske tone, der ligger i forlængelse af den overleverede mytologi, skuffer den fælt."

Valhalla sold 11,379 tickets in Denmark during its opening weekend, and it had sold 44,364 tickets by October 25 of that same year. In comparison, Ahmad's previous film, Darkland sold 173,567 tickets.

The film was nominated for the Robert Award for Best Children's Film 2019, though it lost it to Checkered Ninja.
