= Art of the Title =

Publication about title sequence design

- Website type: Motion design publication
- Available in: English
- Owner: Art of the Title Ltd.
- Creators: Ian Albinson, Alex Ulloa
- Editor: Lola Landekic
- Website: artofthetitle.com
- Launched: 2007
- Current status: Active

Art of the Title (AOTT) is an online publication dedicated to title sequence design, spanning the film, television, conference, and video game industries. The publication is both an educational and historical resource and a contemporary publication, focusing on the creative process behind the design of title sequences. It combines interviews with filmmakers and directors, designers, and craftspeople with in-depth analyses and behind-the-scenes materials. Since 2018, the site has been run by Editor-in-Chief Lola Landekic, a graphic and title designer based in Toronto, Canada.

== Overview ==
Art of the Title is the leading online resource of title design, with hundreds of title sequences available to view. The site features title design from countries around the world and aims to "honor the creators and innovators who contribute to the field, discussing and displaying their work with a desire to explicate, facilitate, and instigate." The Independent has said that Art of the Title may well be the "best place to visit in search of more of these neglected wonders of film art." Film Comment called the site "a praiseworthy and priceless compendium" in 2011, and said, "Art of the Title's greatest achievement has been to single out and champion the journeymen designers who painstakingly sculpt opening ephemera."

Art of the Title staff have been invited to speak at industry conferences and festivals such as SXSW, AIGA, PromaxBDA, MODE Summit, Gamercamp, TIFF Next Wave, Nordic Media Festival, and TCM Classic Film Festival. They have also done several talks in partnership with the Toronto International Film Festival's Reel Comfort series.

== History ==
Art of the Title was founded by motion designer Ian Albinson and launched in 2007 as a blog intending to highlight the design of title sequences.

In 2008, Alexander Ulloa joined the site as Head Writer. In 2011, the site expanded with the addition of writers and editors Lola Landekic and Will Perkins in the roles of Managing Editor and Senior Editor, respectively.

In 2011, the Art of the Title team curated the title design section of the Graphic Design — Now in Production exhibition, co-organized by the Walker Art Center and the Smithsonian Institution's Cooper-Hewitt, National Design Museum. The exhibition ran from October 22, 2011 – January 22, 2012 at the Walker Art Center, Minneapolis, and then was taken on a tour including stints in New York, Los Angeles, Grand Rapids, Houston, Winston-Salem, and Providence. A comprehensive, illustrated catalogue produced by the Walker Art Center and featuring an 18-page section on title design curated and written by Art of the Title accompanies the exhibition.

In 2012, the site launched a redesign developed in partnership with New Zealand-based studio CactusLab. The redesign adopted a responsive structure, allowing the site to "seamlessly adapt from desktop to mobile" and to provide "better cross-referencing of data alongside new bio pages for title designers and studios."

In 2013, the site went down temporarily when its Iron Man 3 article was linked from Robert Downey Jr.'s Facebook page.

In April 2015, the site announced an exclusive look at the James Bond Spectre title sequence, which turned out to be a rickroll. Readers' reactions ran the gamut from outrage to kudos.

In June 2017, site editors Lola Landekic and Will Perkins hosted a screening and discussion of films by designers and filmmakers Saul Bass and Elaine Bass at the Smithsonian American Art Museum in Washington, DC.

In November 2018, Art of the Title was the first publication to confirm news of title designer Pablo Ferro's death. Editor-in-Chief Lola Landekic contributed to Ferro's obituary in The Washington Post.

=== SXSW Title Design Awards ===
From 2010-2014, Art of the Title facilitated and participated in the jury of the SXSW Excellence in Title Design Awards, part of the SXSW Film Festival.

In 2013, Ian Albinson hosted a discussion at the title screening event, and then announced the winners at the Film Awards.

In 2014, Lola Landekic and Will Perkins gave a talk ahead of the Title Design Awards and hosted a discussion with filmmaker and designer Henry Hobson.
