= Cecilia Loffredo =

Danish actress

- Born: Cecilia Loffredo; 24 July 2008 (age 17); Copenhagen, Denmark
- Occupation: Actress
- Years active: 2019–present

Cecilia Loffredo (born 24 July 2008, Copenhagen, Denmark) is a Danish actress.

== Career ==
Cecilia debuted in the film Valhala as Røskva and rose to fame as Luna on Netflix TV series The Rain.

== Filmography ==
Year	Title	Role	Notes
2019	Valhala	Røskva	
2020	The Rain	Luna jubii	TV series
2022	All I Want For Christmas: The Magic Time Machine	Lucia	
2024	Mysteriet på Bornholm	Tania	TV series
