= The Shamer's Daughter =

- Directed by: Kenneth Kainz
- Written by: Anders Thomas Jensen; Lene Kaaberbøl
- Based on: The Shamer's Daughter by Lene Kaaberbøl
- Starring: Rebecca Emilie Sattrup; Peter Plaugborg; Jakob Oftebro
- Cinematography: Lasse Frank Johannessen
- Music by: Jeppe Kaas
- Release date: 26 March 2015
- Running time: 96 minutes
- Language: Danish
- Budget: ~DKK 50 million

The Shamer's Daughter (Danish: Skammerens datter) is a 2015 Danish action fantasy film, directed by Kenneth Kainz. It was based on Lene Kaaberbøl's eponymous book.

== Plot ==
The King of Dunark has been murdered along with his pregnant wife and her 4-year-old daughter . The apparent killer is the King's elder son, Nicodemus Ravens (Jakob Oftebro), and has been found dead drunk, holding a dagger in his hand. But so long as he does not admit to his crime, he cannot be found guilty. The Master of Law sends for Melussina Tonerre (Maria Bonnevie), a "witch" who has the gift of probing someone's mind. Although she sees Nicodemus' remorse for his past behavior, she finds no shame for the royal family's slaughter. To further the trial, Lord Drakan (Peter Plaugborg) goes and picks up Dina (Rebecca Emilie Satrup), Melussina's daughter, who has the same ability. When Dina is placed before Nico to look through his shame, she sees the same as her mother, she sees that Nico has a lot to be ashamed of, but that he has no relation to the murder of the king,

== Cast ==
- Rebecca Emilie Sattrup as Dina Tonerre
- Petra Maria Scott Nielsen as Rosa
- Peter Plaugborg as Drakan
- Maria Bonnevie as Melussina Tonerre (Dina's mother)
- Søren Malling as Master of Arms
- Roland Møller as Hannes, Master of Arm's assistant
- Jakob Oftebro as Nicodemus Ravens ("Nico")
- Stina Ekblad as Lady Lizea
- Allan Hyde as Davin
- Laura Bro as Ms. Petri
- Olaf Johannessen as Master Maunus
- Jóhann G. Jóhansson as Dres
- Adam Ild Rohweder as Aun
- Peter Hosking

== Sequels ==
The second part of the saga Skammerens Datter II: Slangens Gave finished post production in late 2018 and premiered on 24 January 2019.
