= Loving Adults =

2022 Danish drama film

- Kærlighed for voksne
- Directed by: Barbara Topsøe-Rothenborg
- Starring: Dar Salim; Sonja Richter
- Release date: 26 August 2022
- Running time: 104 minutes
- Country: Denmark
- Language: Danish

Loving Adults (Danish: Kærlighed for voksne) is a 2022 Danish drama film directed by Barbara Topsøe-Rothenborg.

== Plot ==
A police commissioner, Holger, tells his daughter the story of the married couple Christian Holm and Leonora Holm. Christian works as a construction worker with his friend Peter. Leonora is a housewife who put her career as a violinist on hold years ago to care for the couple's son, Johan, who is finally in remission and graduating from high school soon.

One night, Christian receives a text at 4 AM, claiming it is from Peter. When Leonora demands to see the text, Christian hurls his phone at the wall, destroying it. Leonora suspects that Christian is having an affair with Xenia, a young architect with whom he works on a current contract, after investigating the companies Facebook page. At an office party, Leonora discovers Christian having sex with Xenia in his office, with Xenia looking her directly in the eyes during the act.

When Christian attempts to break up with Leonora, she confronts Christian about the affair. Leonora demands that Christian break up with Xenia. If not, she will report him for embezzling funds from his company to pay for Johan's treatments. Looking for leverage on Leonora, Christian learns from one of her old friends from school that she used to have a boyfriend named Mike, who mysteriously fell off a cliff to his death one night at an outdoor party.

Christian confronts Leonora about Mike at home, accusing her of pushing him off the cliff. A furious Leonora demands that Christian calls Xenia at once to break up. Refusing to do so, Christian is thrown out of the house. Christian waits along Leonora's usual route that night, running her over with a company van. Returning home, Leonora soon comes home from running, having taken a different route that night. Realizing that he must have run over another woman, a shocked Christian feigns that he has broken up with Xenia and decided to stay with Leonora.

After Johan's graduation, Christian ignores Xenia's text and briefly contemplates turning himself in to the police. Leonora discovers that Christian washed the company van after the hit-and-run. Deducing that he intended to kill her that night, Leonora tries to turn Christian in, but Christian manages to convince the police commissioner of his innocence temporarily. Summoning Christian to a restaurant, Leonora reveals that she did kill Mike back in the day. Leonora pressures Christian into helping her kill Xenia, believing that Christian will not attempt to murder her again if he cannot leave her for Xenia.

Christian and Leonora check into a spa resort. While Christian sneaks out of their room to Xenia's allotment, Leonora provides him with an alibi by playing a sound recording from the hotel room bathroom of him speaking and texting Xenia a breakup text from Christian's phone. At the allotment, Christian makes up with Xenia, and the two have sex. Afterward, Xenia goes to the bathroom, where she is stabbed to death by Leonora, who correctly deduced that Christian would not be able to kill Xenia.

The police commissioner and his partner found the apartment clean, and Xenia was missing. They interrogate Christian and Leonora, with Christian admitting to having had an affair with Xenia and claiming to have broken up with her over text message while at the spa resort. Suspicious of the couple, the police commissioner orders police dogs to search the area. At a Sankt Hans celebration later that evening, Christian eagerly encourages his friend Kim to help light the bonfire early. As the police dogs arrive and begin barking at the bonfire, the police commissioner realizes that Christian and Leonora must have hidden Xenia's body in the bonfire. Still, Christian sets it ablaze before the commissioner can intervene. As the police commissioner leaves, Christian and Leonora watch from afar as the fire consumes Xenia's body.

It is revealed that the police commissioner has been telling his daughter the story before her wedding as a cautionary tale about marriage. Somewhere in a foreign country, a mournful Christian dumps Xenia's remains into the water.

== Cast ==
- Dar Salim - Christian
- Sonja Richter - Leonora
- Sus Wilkins - Xenia
- Mikael Birkkjær - Politimester
- Lars Ranthe - Kim
