= False Olaf =

Imposter pretender executed in 1402

The False Olaf was a man executed on 28 October 1402 for impersonating King Olaf II of Denmark and Norway, who had died as a teenager in 1387. Condemned for treason, the False Olaf was sentenced to be burned wearing a necklace of his letters.

The Prussian chronicler Johann von Posilge, parish priest of Deutsch Eylau (Iława), reported in about 1420 that a poor sick man came to that region in 1402 and stayed near the village of Graudenz (now Grudziądz in Poland). A group of Danish merchants asked him if he was not well known in Denmark, since he looked very much like the late King Olaf. The merchants left to find another who had seen the real king and returned with him. When the newcomer saw the one they took for Olaf, he cried out, "My lord king!" There was already a popular belief, especially in Norway, that Olaf's mother, Margaret I of Denmark, had poisoned him so that she could continue to rule as regent, and even a rumour that he had hidden himself and escaped. News of the man in Graudenz reached another merchant, Tyme von der Nelow, who took the man to Danczik (now Gdańsk). The high born of the town welcomed Olaf as the rightful king of Denmark and Norway and gave him fine clothes and presents. A seal was made for him, and he wrote to Queen Margaret demanding the restoration of his lands and titles. Queen Margaret wrote back, saying that if he could prove himself her son, she would gladly accept him.

The Grand Master of the Teutonic Order, Konrad von Jungingen, escorted the pretender to Kalmar to be interviewed by the Queen. As soon as the man arrived, he was discovered to be an impostor. He could speak not a single word of Danish and, on questioning, admitted he was a Bohemian immigrant to Prussia and the son of peasants Wolf and Margaret from Erlau (now Eger). The false Olaf was taken to Lund in Scania. There, he admitted to his breach against the monarchy and was condemned to be burned at the stake. The letters he wrote to Queen Margaret were hung around his neck and a mock crown placed on his head before he was lowered into the flames. His possessions were given to a monastery, and the Queen had the false Olaf's seal destroyed. The Danish Council of the Realm released a detailed explanation of the real Olaf's death in 1387 to contradict the story that had spread around the Baltic.

In 2024, medieval historian Richard Cole wrote about "the relative amateurishness of the scheme" and concluded that "it belongs to a broader genre of hapless intervention that occurs when mercantile interests (or the interests of capital) fail to grasp properly the workings of governments."

== See also ==
- Margrete: Queen of the North – 2021 Danish film about events leading to the trial of the False Olaf where he was played by Norwegian actor Jakob Oftebro.
