= Go With Peace, Jamil =

Go with Peace, Jamil
- Directed by: Omar Shargawi
- Starring: Dar Salim
- Release date: 28 January 2008 (IFFR)
- Running time: 1h 30min
- Country: Denmark
- Languages: Arabic, Danish

Go with Peace, Jamil (Danish: Gå med fred, Jamil) is a 2008 Danish action film directed by Omar Shargawi.
