= Danica Curcic =

Danish actress

- Даница Ћурчић
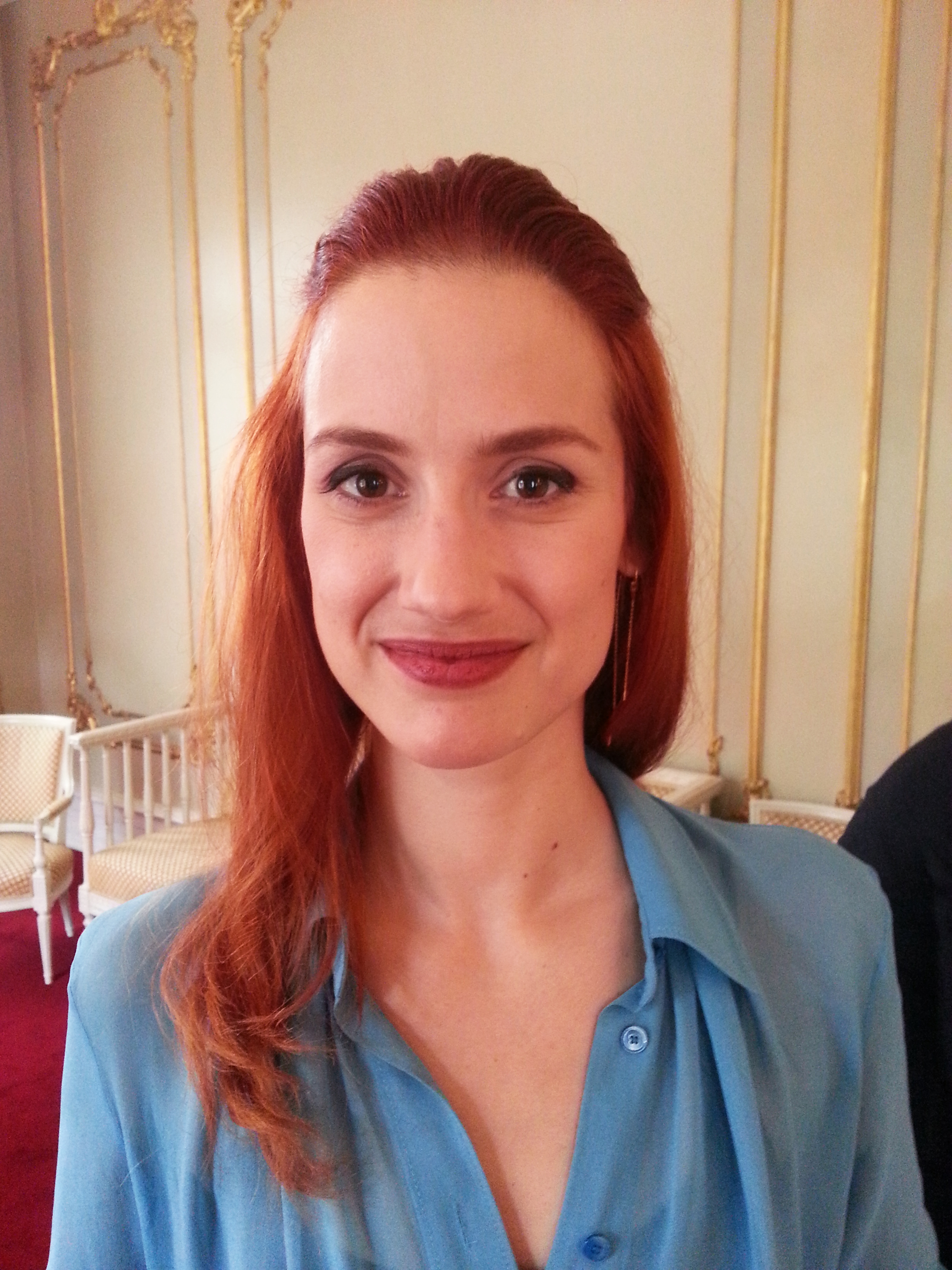
- Curcic in 2016
- Born: Danica Ćurčić; 27 August 1985 (age 41); Belgrade, SR Serbia, SFR Yugoslavia
- Occupation: Actress
- Years active: 1993–present

Danica Curcic (Serbian: Даница Ћурчић, romanized: Danica Ćurčić; born 27 August 1985) is a Serbian Danish actress.

== Biography ==
Curcic was born in Belgrade. At the age of one, she moved to Copenhagen with her family where her father worked at the Yugoslavian embassy. Curcic attended Sankt Annæ Gymnasium before obtaining a bachelor's degree in film and media studies from the University of Copenhagen. She then spent a year in California where she took acting classes at the Dell'Arte International School of Physical Theatre before enrolling at the Danish National School of Performing Arts, graduating in 2012.

== Career ==
Curcic had her feature film debut in Over kanten in 2012. In 2014, she received a Shooting Star Award at the Berlin International Film Festival in 2014. In 2015, she received a Danish Film Critics Association Award for Best Actress for her role in Bille August's Silent Heart.

== Filmography ==
=== Film ===
Year	Title	Role	Notes
2011	Mike Hunt	Woman	
2012	Fængsel	Sofie	
2012	Over kanten	Veronika	
2013	Oasen	Laura	
2014	On the Edge	Signe	
2014	All Inclusive	Ditte	
2014	The Absent One	Kimmie	Nominated—Bodil Award for Best Actress in a Supporting Role
2014	Silent Heart	Sanne	Bodil Award for Best Actress in a Leading Role
2015	Long Story Short	Maya	
2015	The Gold Coast	Caroline	
2016	Across the Water	Miriam	
2017	Darling	Darling	
2019	Mom Squad	Tine	
2019	Out Stealing Horses		
2021	Murina	Nela	
2021	The Bombardment	Rigmor's Mother	
2022	Mrak	Vukica	

=== Television ===
Year	Title	Role	Notes
2011	Those Who Kill	Magretha	1 episode
2015	Wallander	Corina	1 episode
2013	The Bridge	Beate Frelle	5 episodes
2016	Nobel	Adella Hanefi	Main cast
2017	The Mist	Mia Lambert	Main cast
2018	Warrior (Kriger)	Louise	Main cast
2020	Equinox	Astrid	Main cast
2021, 2026	The Chestnut Man	Naia Thulin	Main cast
2021, 2026	Face to Face	Louise	1 episode
2025	Secrets We Keep	Katarina	6 episodes
