= Ali Sivandi =

Danish actor

Ali Sivandi is a Danish actor in Danish films, television series, on stage and radio.

== Beginnings ==
Ali Sivandi’s father is an Iranian immigrant who worked as an auto painter and his mother is an Arab Iraqi with additional roots in Kazakhstan and Russia and had worked as a head chef at a restaurant in Tivoli, Copenhagen. With encouragement from his mother, he had various roles in stage theatre. He also attended vocational trade school, to learn to be a mechanic, a cook, but without completing the studies.

== Career ==
Sivandi grew up in Nørrebro and Brøndby Strand, areas with high concentrations of immigrants to Denmark. He was witness to the tough streets leading to playing violent gangster roles, drug dealing and urban life. He befriended and hung out with rappers Gilli, Sivas and KESI and notably his old schoolmate Dulfi Al-Jabouri, who had ended up in a leading role in the third season of the Danish TV series Follow the Money (original Danish title Bedrag) and in the film Nordvest. Although he did not have a formal acting education, his breakthrough came through meeting Danish film director Fenar Ahmad who saw a potential in him and offered him a lead role in his debut long feature Flow (original Danish title Ækte vare) in 2014 in a gangster role. Gaining critical acclaim from film critics, also leading to a nomination to "Best Supporting Actor" award for his role in the film during the 68th Bodil Awards in 2015, he has moved to acting in a number of well received film and television productions.

He appeared in Eliten in 2015, a film directed by Thomas Daneskov Mikkelsen. In 2017 Fenar Ahmad offered him another lead role in Darkland (Danish title Underverden), and in 2019 he also appeared in Ahmad's film Valhalla.

He has acted in a number of TV series like Ditte & Louise in 2016, Below the Surface (original Danish title Gidseltagningen) and Parterapi.

In 2020, controversy arose after Sivandi posted a video on his Instagram of him making fun of a cross-dressing architecture student named Aleksander Aarstad.

== Filmography ==
Feature films

- 2014: Flow (Danish title Ækte vare) as Tariq (directed by Fenar Ahmad)
- 2015: Eliten as Joachim / drug dealer (directed by Thomas Daneskov Mikkelsen)
- 2017: Darkland (Danish title Underverden) as Semion (directed by Fenar Ahmad)
- 2019: Valhalla as Skrymer (directed by Fenar Ahmad)

Film shorts

- 2014: Adils Krig as Omar

TV series

- 2016: Ditte & Louise as John (TV series, 1 episode)
- 2017: Joe Tech (TV series, 2 episodes)
- 2017: Perfekte Steder as Hassan (TV series, 1 episode)
- 2019: Follow the Money (Danish title Bedrag) as Nabil (TV series, 8 episodes)
- 2019: 29 (TV series, 1 episode)
- 2019: Below the Surface (Danish title Gidseltagningen) as Rami (TV series, 8 episodes)
- 2019: Parterapi as Alex (TV Series, 4 episodes)
