= 27th Robert Awards =

2010 Danish film awards ceremony

- Date: 7 February 2010
- Organized by: Danish Film Academy

Highlights
- Best Film: Antichrist
- Most awards: Antichrist (7)
- Most nominations: Antichrist (12)

The 27th Robert Awards ceremony was held on 7 February 2010 in Copenhagen, Denmark. Organized by the Danish Film Academy, the awards honoured the best in Danish and foreign film of 2009.

== Honorees ==
=== Best Danish Film ===
- Antichrist

=== Best Children's Film ===
- Superbror – Birger Larsen

=== Best Director ===
- Lars von Trier – Antichrist

=== Best Screenplay ===
- Lars von Trier – Antichrist

=== Best Actor in a Leading Role ===
- Lars Mikkelsen – Headhunter (2009 film)

=== Best Actress in a Leading Role ===
- Paprika Steen – Applause

=== Best Actor in a Supporting Role ===
- Henning Moritzen – Headhunter (2009 film)

=== Best Actress in a Supporting Role ===
- Pernille Vallentin – Deliver Us from Evil

=== Best Production Design ===
- Søren Kragh Sørensen & Finn Richardt – Kærestesorger

=== Best Cinematography ===
- Anthony Dod Mantle – Antichrist

=== Best Costume Design ===
- Anne-Dorte Fischer – Kærestesorger

=== Best Makeup ===
- Malin Birch-Jensen & Karina Åse – Kærestesorger

=== Best Editing ===
- Anders Refn – Antichrist

=== Best Sound Design ===
- Kristian Eidnes Andersen – Antichrist

=== Best Score ===
- Tina Dickow – Oldboys

=== Best Special Effects ===
- Peter Hjorth, Soda ApS and Ota Bares – Antichrist

=== Best Song ===
- Tina Dickow – "Rebel Song" – Oldboys

=== Best Short Fiction/Animation ===
- Megaheavy – Fenar Ahmad

=== Best Long Fiction/Animation ===
- Bobby – Julie Bille

=== Documentary Short ===
- Ønskebørn – Birgitte Stærmose

=== Best Documentary Feature ===
- Fra Haifa til Nørrebro - Omar Shargawi

=== Best American Film ===
- Up – Pete Docter

=== Best Non-American Film ===
- Slumdog Millionaire – Danny Boyle

=== Audience Award ===
- Sorte kugler

== See also ==
- 2010 Bodil Awards
