= Fenar Ahmad =

Danish filmmaker of Iraqi origin

Fenar Ahmad (in Arabic فنار أحمد) is a Danish filmmaker of Iraqi origin. He was born in 1981 in Czechoslovakia to immigrant Iraqi parents. In 1986 the family emigrated to Denmark. There he studied film in the alternative film school Super16.

== Career ==
Ahmad is known for the award-winning 2010 short film Megaheavy, co-written by Ahmad and Jacob Katz Hansen and directed by Ahmad. It won Robert Award for Best Short Fiction/Animation for 2010 during the 27th Robert Awards in Copenhagen on 7 February 2010.

In 2014, Ahmad directed the long feature film Flow (also known by the Danish title Ækte vare) starring Danish rapper Kian Rosenberg Larsson, better known as Gilli. The film was nominated for New Talent Grand PIX at the CPH PIX festival in 2014. It was also nominated for the Best Children / Youth film and for Audience Award at the Robert Film Awards. The soundtrack for the film with rap music by Gilli, MellemFingaMuzik, Murro, KESI, Højer Øye and S!vas charted peaking at number 8 on the Hitlisten, the official Danish Albums Chart.

In 2017 his second feature Darkland (Underverden) premiered and topped the Danish Box Office reaching over 180,000 admissions. The film stars Dar Salim as a doctor, who gives up his privileged lifestyle and sets out on a mission through Copenhagen's criminal underworld, to avenge his younger brother's death. The film also stars Stine Fischer Christensen, Ali Sivandi, Roland Møller, Dulfi Al-Jabouri and B. Branco from MellemFingaMuzik. Jens Ole Wowk McCoy from the Danish group Ukendt Kunstner did the score which was released following the Danish release. The film has been sold to multiple territories internationally.

== Filmography ==
Feature films

- 2014: Flow (Ækte vare)
- 2017: Darkland (Underverden)
- 2019: Valhalla

Short films (fiction)

- 2007: Paragraf 15
- 2008: Mesopotamia
- 2009: Megaheavy
- 2010: Torshammer

Documentaries

- 2007: Nice to Meet You
- 2009: Rejsecirkus
- 2009: Den Perfekte Muslim
- 2009: Climaniacs (anthology)

== Awards ==
For film Megaheavy

- 2010: Won Robert Award for Best Short Fiction/Animation during 27th Robert Awards in Copenhagen
- 2010: Won Grand Prix, National Competition, Odense International Film Festival (2010)
- 2010: Honorable Mention, Stockholm International Film Festival
- 2010: Special Mention, Edinburgh International Film Festival
- 2010: Nominated for the Crystal Bear, Generation 14plus – Best Short Film, Berlin International Film Festival

For film Flow or Ækte vare

- 2014: Nominated for New Talent Grand PIX at CPH PIX festival
- 2015: Nominated for Best Children / Youth film, Robert Film Festival (shared with Morten Kjems Juhl and Nina Bisgaard (co-producers))
- 2015: Nominated for Audience Award, Robert Film Festival (shared with Morten Kjems Juhl and Nina Bisgaard (co-producers))
