= Charlotte Sieling =

Danish actress and film director (born 1960)

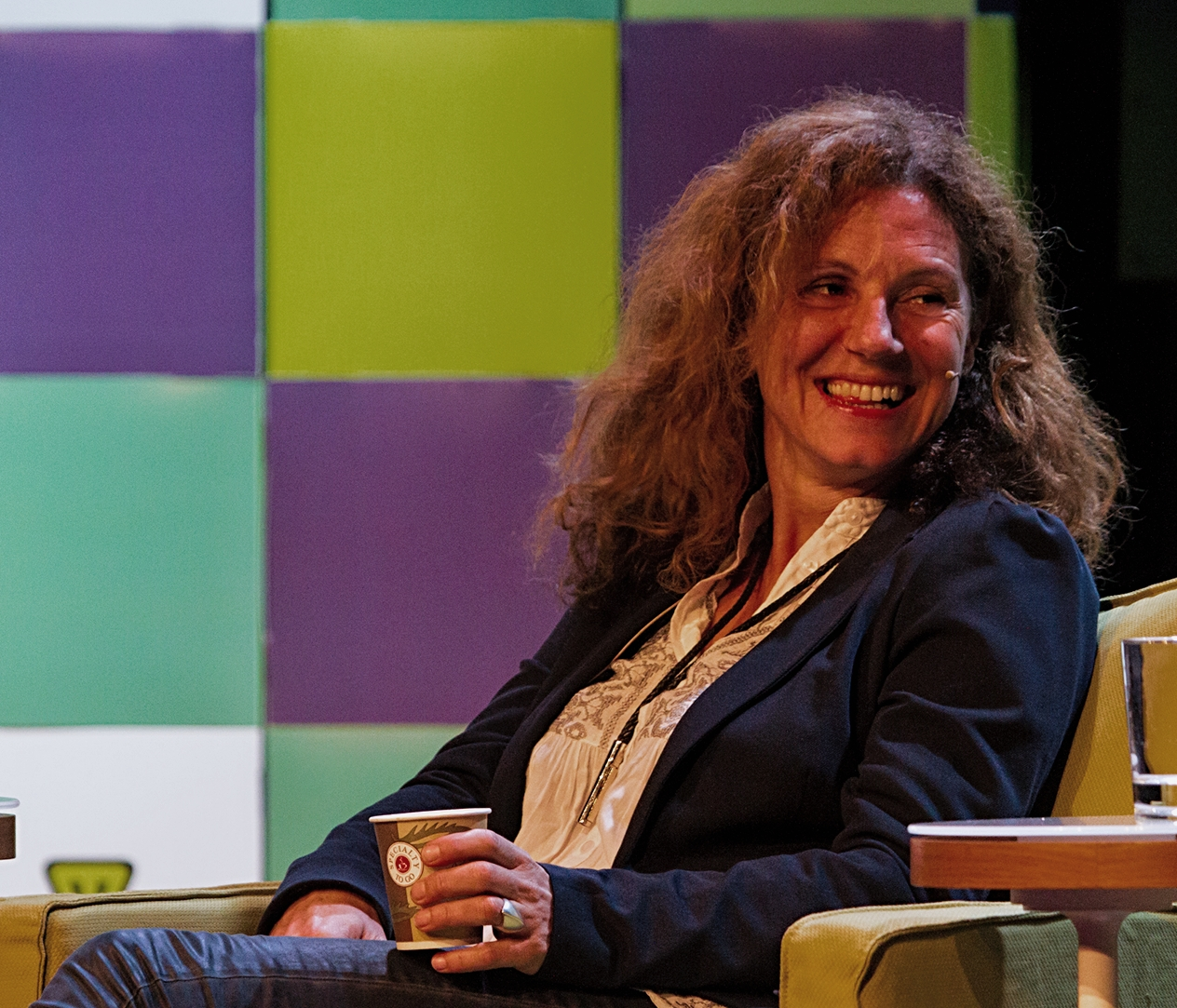
- Sieling at the Nordic Media Festival in 2012
- Born: July 13, 1960 (age 66); Copenhagen, Denmark
- Occupations: Actor, film director
- Spouse: Peter Langdal (m. 1996; div. 2000)
- Children: 2

Charlotte Sieling (born 13 July 1960) is a Danish actress and film director. She began her career as an actress in the mid-1980s. In the 2000s, she turned to film directing, working on a number of successful DR TV series such as the Emmy-winning Unit One, The Killing, The Bridge and the BAFTA-winning Borgen. She had her feature film debut with Above the Street, Below the Water in 2009. Her success as a director of TV series has more recently brought her to the US where her work includes directing two episodes of Homeland.

== Early life and education ==
Sieling was born in Copenhagen. She completed her education as actress at National Theatre School of Denmark in 1985. In 1985, she graduated from the National Film School of Denmark where she attended the screenplay line.

== Career ==
Between 1988 and 1991, Sieling was affiliated with the Royal Danish Theatre where her roles included the lead in the musical Esther. From 1992 to 1994, she was affiliated with the Betty Nansen Theatre.

Sieling had her debut as a director when she directed eight episodes of Unit One. She has continued her collaboration with DR, working on a number of their most successful television series. She worked on the first season of The Killing directed the first four episodes of Danish/Swedish crime series The Bridge and was conceptual director on the third season of BAFTA Award-winning Borgen

She had her feature film debut with Above the Street, Below the Water in 2009. In 2013–14, she has worked on a number of television series in the US.

== Personal life ==
Sieling married theatre manager and stage director Peter Langdal in 1996. The couple divorced in 2000. They have two children.

== Filmography ==
=== Film ===
As an actress

| Year | Title | Role | Notes |
|---|---|---|---|
| 1986 | The Wolf at the Door | | |
| 1988 | Mord i Paradis | | |
| 1989 | Notater om kærligheden | | |
| 1990 | Farlig leg | | |
| 1993 | Det bli'r i familien | | |
| 1994 | Frække Frida og de frygtløse spioner | | |
| 1995 | Farligt venskab | | |
| 1995 | Elsker, elsker ikke | Hannah | Nominated—Bodil Award for Best Actress in a Leading Role |
| 1995 | Carmen & Babyface | | |
| 1996 | En loppe kan også gø | | |
| 2003 | The Five Obstructions | | |
| 2005 | Accused | Miriam | |
| 2006 | Supervoksen | | |

==== As a director ====
| Year | Title | Notes |
|---|---|---|
| 2009 | Above the Street, Below the Water | Nominated—Bodil Award for Best Actress in a Supporting Role |
| 2017 | Mesteren | |
| 2021 | Margrete den første | |

=== Television ===
==== As an actress ====
| Year | Title | Role | Notes |
|---|---|---|---|
| 1992 | Gøngehøvdingen | | 3 episodes |
| 1998 | Taxa | | |
| 2003 | Unit One | | 1 episode |

==== As a director ====
| Year | Title | Notes |
|---|---|---|
| 2000–2002 | Rejseholdet | 8 episodes |
| 2004–2005 | Krøniken | 3 episodes |
| 2007 | The Killing | 12 episodes |
| 2011 | Broen | 4 episodes |
| 2013 | Borgen | 2 episodes |
| 2013 | Jo | 2 episodes |
| 2013 | The Bridge | 1 episode |
| 2013 | Graceland | 1 episode |
| 2013 | White Collar | 1 episode |
| 2014 | The Americans | 1 episode |
| 2014 | Those Who Kill | 1 episode |
| 2014 | Tyrant | 1 episode |
| 2014 | The Strain | 2 episodes |
| 2014-2018 | Homeland | 2 episodes |
| 2015 | Wayward Pines | 1 episode |
| 2016 | Queen of the South | 1 episode |
| 2016 | Good Behavior | 1 episode |
| 2019 | The InBetween | 1 episode |
| 2020 | Lovecraft Country | 1 episode |
| 2026 | Dark Matter | 2 episodes |
