= Sons (2024 film) =

2024 film by Gustav Möller

- Festival release poster
- Danish: Vogter
- Literally: Guardian
- Directed by: Gustav Möller
- Written by: Gustav Möller; Emil Nygaard Albertsen
- Produced by: Lina Flint; Thomas Heinesen
- Starring: Sidse Babett Knudsen; Sebastian Bull
- Cinematography: Jasper J. Spanning
- Edited by: Rasmus Stensgaard Madsen
- Music by: Jon Ekstrand
- Production company: Nordisk Film Production
- Distributed by: Les Films du Losange
- Release dates: 22 February 2024 (Berlinale); 12 September 2024 (Sweden)
- Running time: 100 minutes
- Countries: Denmark; Sweden
- Language: Danish

Sons (Danish: Vogter) is a 2024 psychological thriller co-written and directed by Gustav Möller. The film stars Sidse Babett Knudsen and Sebastian Bull is about an idealistic prison officer Eva Hansen, who faces the dilemma of her life.

The European co-production between Denmark and Sweden was selected in the Competition at the 74th Berlin International Film Festival, where it competed for the Golden Bear with its first screening on 22 February at Berlinale Palast.

== Synopsis ==
Eva is a prison guard with high ideals, but her life is turned upside down when the murderer of her son arrives at her prison. She secretly requests to work in his section, the most brutal and dangerous one. This starts a disturbing psychological thriller where Eva's sense of fairness challenges her ethics and her destiny. Her growing feelings of revenge and her ideals collide.

== Cast ==
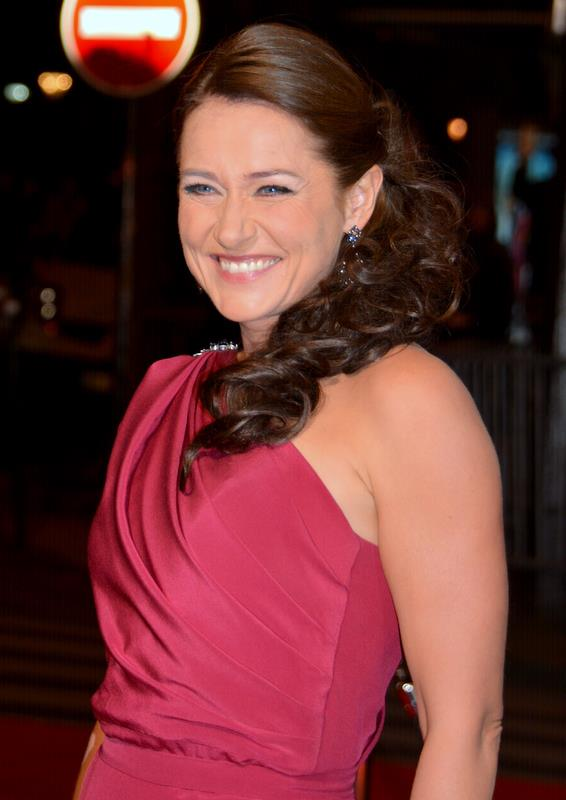
Sidse Babett Knudsen in 2016

- Sidse Babett Knudsen as Eva Hansen
- Sebastian Bull as Mikkel
- Dar Salim as Rami
- Marina Bouras as Helle
- Olaf Johannessen as head of institution
- Jacob Lohmann as priest
- Siir Tilif as lawyer
- Rami Zayat as Ali
- Mathias Petersen as Simon

== Production ==
The film produced by Lina Flint for Nordisk Film with support from the Danish Film Institute, the Swedish Film Institute was made in collaboration with DR, SVT and Les Films du Losange. Nordisk Film is also domestic distributor whereas Les Films du Losange holds world selling rights.

== Release ==
Sons had its world premiere on 22 February 2024, as part of the 74th Berlin International Film Festival, in Competition.

The film was screened at the 48th Hong Kong International Film Festival on 4 April 2024 in Firebird Awards Young Cinema competition.

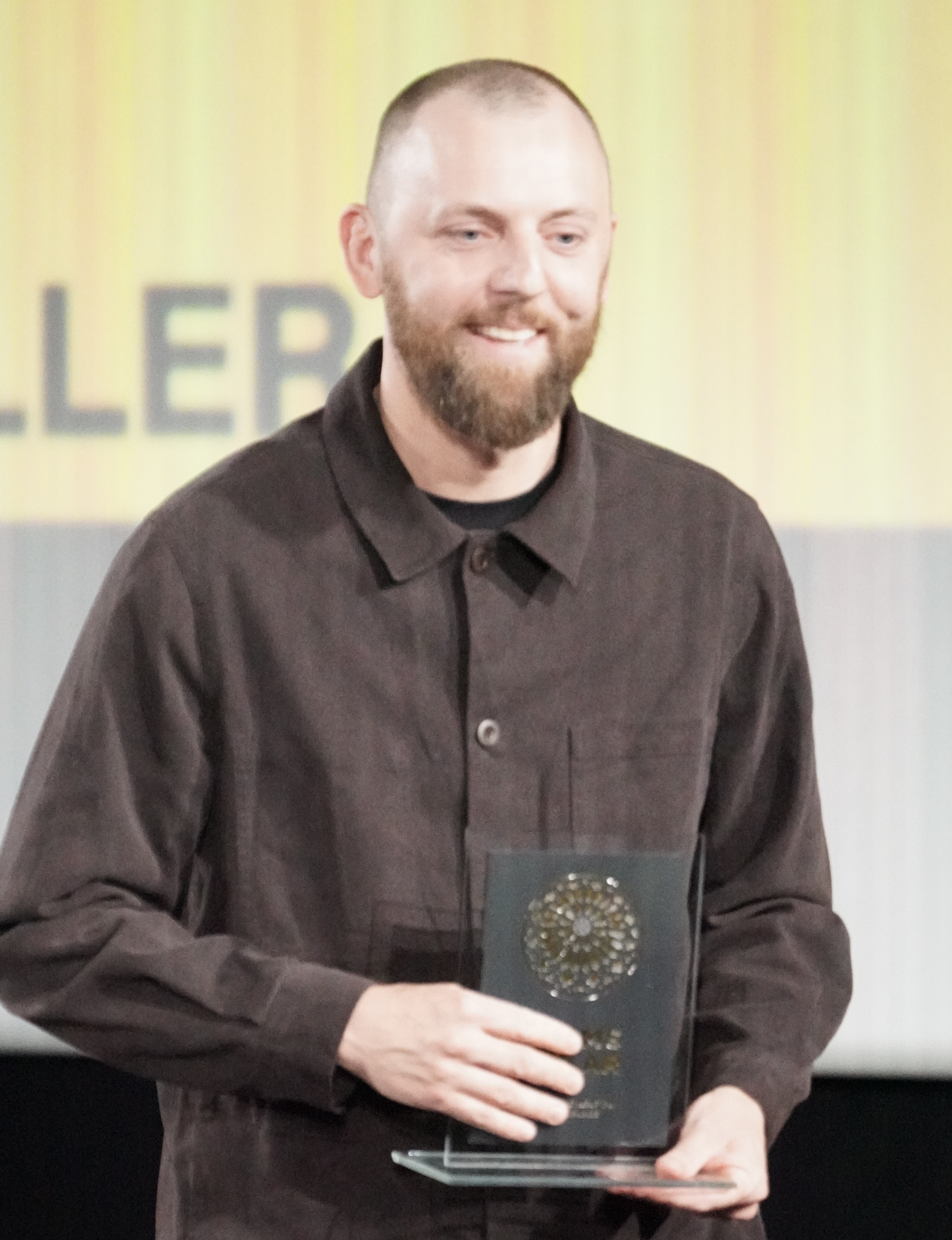
Youth Prize, Reims Polar Film Festival

The film was screened at the Reims Polar in April 2024.

It was released in Danish and Swedish theaters on 12 September 2024.

== Reception ==
On the review aggregator Rotten Tomatoes website, the film has an approval rating of 80% based on 10 reviews, with an average rating of 6/10.

Stephen Saito reviewing for Moveable Fest at Berlinale wrote, "True justice may be hard to come by in the world that’s depicted here, but in arriving at a strikingly fair conclusion, Sons does so by its characters trapped in an impossible situation."

Peter Debruge reviewing in Variety said, "Sons is not a pious tale of an inspirational prison guard." He opined that for Borgen fans, "Sidse Babett Knudsen’s performance reveals a more unpredictable side of the star, who gives an at-times feral turn fueled by rage and regret." Debruge in his review also raised questions such as: "Are there no background checks for Danish prison guards?" also "And no consequences for beating convicts nearly to death?" And then concluded with, "In Sons, the real question is: Where does the cycle stop?"

Davide Abbatescianni reviewing the film at Berlinale for Cineuropa wrote, "Gustav Möller crafts an accomplished sophomore feature telling us some uncomfortable truths about the lives of prison guards and inmates."

David Ehrlich of IndieWire reviewing at Berlinale graded the film B and wrote, "Unresolved and deflatingly rhetorical as it might be, Möller’s thriller maintains its bruising hold over us because it refuses to see that as a failure of his country’s prison system, as opposed to its ultimate success."

Nicholas Bell in Ion Cinema rated the film with three stars and said, "Ultimately, it’s a rather cold, melancholic film seeing how preventable certain miseries could be if everyone just took the time to look beyond themselves to respond with kindness."

Wendy Ide reviewing the film at Berlinale, wrote in ScreenDaily "A tough, taut character study of a woman driven, against all better judgement, to increasingly reckless and dangerous acts."

== Accolades ==
The film was selected in Competition at the 74th Berlin International Film Festival, thus it was nominated to compete for Golden Bear award.

| Award | Date | Category | Recipient | Result | Ref. |
|---|---|---|---|---|---|
| Berlin International Film Festival | 25 February 2024 | Golden Bear | Gustav Möller | Nominated | |
| Hong Kong International Film Festival | 7 April 2024 | Young Cinema Competition (World), Firebird Award | Sons | Won | |
