= Echo (2007 film) =

- Directed by: Anders Morgenthaler
- Written by: Mette Heeno
- Starring: Kim Bodnia; Stine Fischer Christensen; Villads Milthers Fritsche; Peter Stormare
- Release date: 7 December 2007
- Running time: 80 minutes
- Country: Denmark
- Language: Danish

Echo is a 2007 Danish drama film, directed by Anders Morgenthaler, and starring Kim Bodnia.

== Premise ==
A policeman, Simon, abducts his son Louie and takes him to an abandoned cottage. Slowly, he begins to lose his mind.

== Cast ==
- Kim Bodnia as Simon, a former policeman
- Villads Milthers Frische as Louie, Simon's son
- Stine Fischer Christensen as Angelique, a shop assistant
- Peter Stormare

== Release and reception ==
The film was presented at the San Sebastian Film Festival in 2007. Variety praised the acting and first half of the film, but criticized the plot.
