= Sonja Richter =

Danish actress

- Born: 4 January 1974 (age 51); Esbjerg, Denmark
- Occupation: Actress
- Years active: 2002–present

Sonja Richter (born 4 January 1974) is a Danish actress. She is best known for her performance in the 2002 film Open Hearts by Susanne Bier, for which she was nominated for both the Bodil Award and the Robert Award.

In a career which has so far focused on films in her native Denmark, she has starred in Stealing Rembrandt (2003) and Villa Paranoia (2004), along with several other films and a significant amount of work in television. In 2004, at the 54th Berlin International Film Festival, Richter was one of ten young European actors that were presented the Shooting Stars Award by the European Film Promotion. In 2007, she received the Crown Prince Couple's Culture Prize.

== Personal life ==
Richter studied acting at Odense Theatre's Acting School, graduating in 1999.

== Selected filmography ==
Year	Title	Role	Notes
2002	Open Hearts	Cæcilie Pagh	Elsker dig for evigt Nominated—Bodil Award for Best Actress; Nominated—Robert Award for Best Actress
2003	Stealing Rembrandt	Trine	Rembrant
2004	In Your Hands	Marion	Forbrydelser; Nominated—Bodil Award for Best Supporting Actress; Nominated—Robert Award for Best Supporting Actress
2004	Villa Paranoia	Anna	Nominated—Bodil Award for Best Actress; Nominated—Robert Award for Best Actress
2005	The Jewish Toy Merchant	Nina	Opbrud
2007	Cecilie	Cecilie Larsen	Nominated—Bodil Award for Best Actress; Nominated—Robert Award for Best Actress
2007	The Substitute	Maria	Vikaren
2008	What No One Knows	Charlotte Deleuran	Det som ingen ved
2010	The Woman That Dreamed About a Man	Karen	Kvinden der drømte om en mand
2013	Department Q: The Keeper of Lost Causes	Merete Lynggaard	Kvinden i buret Bodil Award for Best Supporting Actress
2014	The Homesman	Gro Svendsen	
2014	When Animals Dream	Mother	
2016	Follow the Money (Danish TV series)	Amanda Absalonsen	
2018	Wild Witch (Vildheks)	Aunt Isa	
2022	Loving Adults	Leonora (Christian's wife)	Netflix

== Awards and nominations ==
Award	Year	Category	Nominated work	Result
Bodil Award	2003	Best Actress	Open Hearts	Nominated
Bodil Award	2005	Best Supporting Actress	In Your Hands	Nominated
Bodil Award	2005	Best Actress	Villa Paranoia	Nominated
Bodil Award	2007	Best Actress	Cecilie	Nominated
Bodil Award	2014	Best Supporting Actress	Department Q: Keeper of Lost Causes	Won
Robert Award	2003	Best Actress	Open Hearts	Nominated
Robert Award	2005	Best Supporting Actress	In Your Hands	Nominated
Robert Award	2005	Best Actress	Villa Paranoia	Nominated
Robert Award	2007	Best Actress	Cecilie	Nominated
Shooting Stars Award	2004	Shooting Star	—	Won
