= Sebastian Bull =

Danish actor (born 1995)

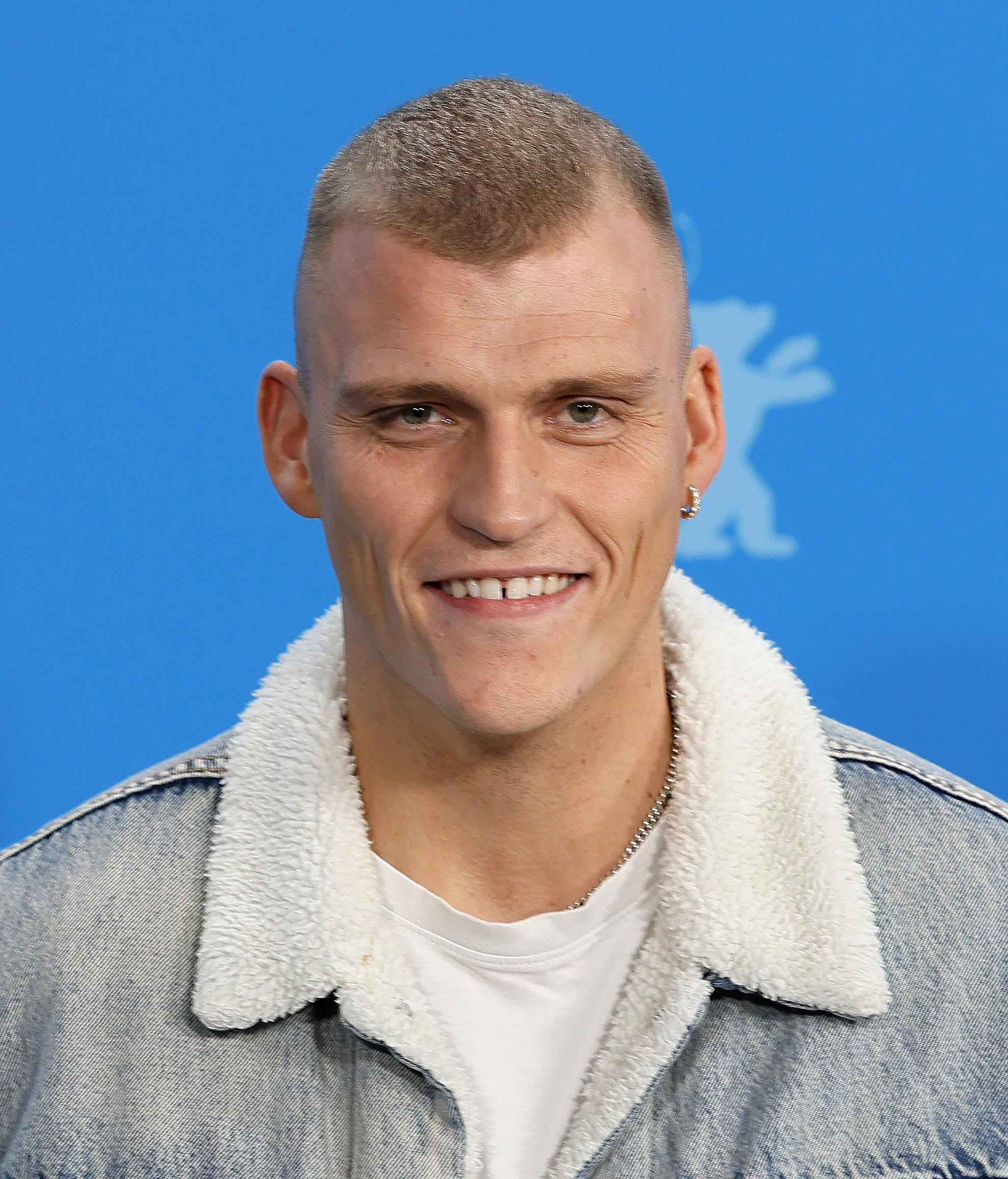
- Bull at the 74th Berlin International Film Festival
- Born: September 25, 1995 (age 30); Hellerup, Denmark
- Occupation: Actor
- Years active: 2010–present
- Notable work: Sons as Mikkel

Sebastian Bull Rygaard Sarning (born September 25, 1995) is a Danish actor. Bull made his screen debut in the 2010 Thomas Vinterberg's drama film Submarino.

== Early and personal life ==
Sebastian Bull was born on September 25, 1995, in Hellerup, Denmark. Bull was hospitalized at Rigshospitalet from birth until the age of two and a half, as he had to undergo several surgeries due to intestinal adhesions.

In February 2024 Bull announced that he was in a relationship with Asta Björk Ivarsdottir, a professional dancer. They met while dancing together on Vild med dans in 2023. Bull announced their engagement in December 2024.

== Career ==
Bull made his acting debut in 2010 in Thomas Vinterberg’s drama Submarino, where he played the main character, Nick, as a child. In 2013 Bull collaborated again with Vinterberg on the drama film The Hunt. He also played Private Lundgren in April 9th.

In 2024 he appeared in Gustav Møller's drama Sons, where he starred alongside Sidse Babett Knudsen. He received his first Bodil and Robert Award nominations in the category of Best Actor.

== Filmography ==
=== Film ===
Year	Title	Role	Notes	Ref.
2010	Submarino	Young Nick		
2012	The Hunt	Torsten		
2015	April 9th	Private Lundgren	Lead role	
2023	Azrael	Isaac		
2024	Sons	Mikkel	Lead role	

=== Television ===
Year	Title	Role	Notes	Ref.
2017	Below the Surface	Hassan		
2020	The Investigation	Ronnie Askov		
