= Margrete: Queen of the North =

2021 Danish historical drama film

- Poster
- Danish: Margrete den Første
- Directed by: Charlotte Sieling
- Written by: Jesper Fink; Maya Ilsøe; Charlotte Sieling
- Produced by: Birgitte Skov; Lars Bredo Rahbek
- Starring: Trine Dyrholm; Søren Malling; Jakob Oftebro; Morten Hee Andersen
- Cinematography: Rasmus Videbæk
- Edited by: Sverrir Kristjánsson
- Music by: Jon Ekstrand
- Distributed by: SF Studios
- Release date: 16 September 2021
- Running time: 120 minutes
- Country: Denmark
- Languages: Danish; Swedish; Norwegian; English; German; French
- Budget: DKK73 million; (≃$9.8 million)
- Box office: $252,152

Margrete: Queen of the North (Danish: Margrete den Første) is a 2021 Danish historical drama film, directed and co-written by Charlotte Sieling. The film is a fictionalised account of the 'False Oluf', an impostor who in 1402 claimed to be the deceased King Olaf II/Olav IV of Denmark and Norway, son of the title character Margrete I of Denmark.

It was one of the largest productions in the history of Danish cinema, enjoying the largest budget ever for a Danish-language feature film. It premiered on 16 September 2021.

== Plot ==
The film opens in 1361 with the infant Princess Margrete of Denmark witnessing the bloodshed of her father King Valdemar IV's victory at the Battle of Visby.

Forty-one years later in 1402, Margrete, now queen regnant, rides across Norway's Hardangervidda plateau with her retinue while a caption relates that she has "gathered Denmark, Norway and Sweden into a union which she single-handedly rules through her adopted son King Erik. For the first time in centuries, there is peace between the Nordic countries." Arriving at a fjord to meet all the leading Nordic magnates, she tells them the Kalmar Union has brought a decade of peace but now needs the creation of a Union army. She announces a planned betrothal of Erik to Princess Philippa, daughter of King Henry IV of England, and explains that a strong army will enable an associated military alliance with England to deter German attacks, particularly by the Teutonic Order, which rules Prussia and has recently seized the Swedish island of Gotland. Each magnate agrees to supply numbers of troops.

Returning west, Margrete asks Roar, a pirate of Kullen in Scania who raids German boats, to blockade Gotland. She also takes charge of Astrid, a Swedish girl rescued from a German boat, and brings her to Kalmar Castle in Sweden. There, Margrete tells her friend, advisor and financial backer Peder Jensen Lodehat, Bishop of the Diocese of Roskilde, about the journey's success.

Three months later, Margrete summons the magnates to Kalmar to greet the arrival of Princess Philippa and Sir William Bourcier, an English lord tasked with negotiating the financial and political terms of the marriage agreement. During the feast of welcome, Norwegian Council leader Asle Jonsson tells Margrete he has come straight from Graudenz (in Prussia), where he saw a man he recognised as King Oluf, Margrete's son. She assures Asle that Oluf died 15 years ago, but he insists the Man from Graudenz is "my King" and has brought him to Smedby. Margrete thinks this 'false Oluf' might be a well-timed plot by the Teutonic Knights, but needs Norway's pledge of troops and so orders Asle to bring him to Kalmar for questioning. Asle agrees to secrecy but news spreads around the feast and Margrete suspects talk by Raberlin, a German trade envoy present.

In the kitchen Astrid, now a servant, hears of Erik being Margrete's sister's grandson and of a rumour that Margrete had Oluf murdered at age 16 to retain power. Meanwhile, Margrete is forced to announce at the feast that the pretender's claim is treason against the Union but that he will receive a fair and public trial.

Negotiations with Bourcier stall over the sudden question of Erik's legitimate kingship, while the Man from Graudenz is interrogated by Margrete's council. Appearing unkempt and in shackles, he swears he is Oluf, son of Håkon VI, the previous Norwegian King. Asked if she recognises him, Margrete only answers "My son died". The man counters by saying that in 1387 someone ordered a retainer named Esge Vind to kill him, but Vind was too afraid and drugged him instead, kidnapping him for permanent captivity by Germans. A few weeks ago a stranger came and released him without explanation, and dropped him at an inn in Graudenz. Vind is now dead and Danish Council leader Jens Due dismisses the story out of hand, but the Norwegians support Asle Jonsson's assertion that "this is my King I see". At this, Erik storms out and Margrete adjourns the trial to consider the implications for the Union.

Over the following days, Margrete ponders her dilemma. Erik - who would lose his legitimacy if the prisoner is recognised as Oluf - becomes agitated and unstable, Bishop Peder urges her to execute the Man from Graudenz immediately to prevent discord between the three realms, and Bourcier threatens to end negotiations if the question of Erik's status is not resolved quickly. On the other hand, the Norwegian councillors will not accept the Man from Graudenz being condemned to death, and the more Margrete speaks to him, the more she starts to wonder if he might actually be her son. A further element of doubt is introduced when she is told none of her councillors were present when he died suddenly at Falsterbo or opened his coffin to see his corpse before burial for fear of plague infection.

In an effort to find a solution, Margrete orders her Swedish retainer Jakob Nilsson to find Roar and go to Prussia for more information, and proposes that if the Man from Graudenz publicly denies that he is Oluf, then she will spare his life. However, he stubbornly refuses to do so, and moreover Bishop Peder points out that even if the pretender were to renounce his claims, he will still be a threat to unity as long as he remains alive.

Margrete eventually has a flash of inspiration and realises that the Man from Graudenz's story about an order to have him killed might be the key. She never gave any such order, and there is only one other person who would have had the authority to do so in her stead. She confronts Peder, who admits that he ordered Oluf's retainer to murder him and explains that he acted for the greater good, as Oluf would never have been an acceptable ruler for the Swedes in the way Margrete has been. It was therefore necessary to get rid of Oluf so that Margrete could retain power in Denmark-Norway and then take control of Sweden as well, thereby uniting Scandinavia and bringing peace.

Margrete is now convinced that the Man from Graudenz is indeed her son Oluf, but before she can act on this, Erik produces a witness to falsely confess to teaching the Man from Graudenz how to impersonate Oluf. Having thus 'proved' that Oluf is an impostor, Erik sentences him to death for treason. Margrete and the Norwegian magnates protest, but the Danish and Swedish magnates back Erik, as do the bishops, led by Peder.

That evening Margrete has Asle spring Oluf from his prison cell, intending that the three of them will escape together to Bergen, though she realises that this will probably lead to war between Norway and Denmark-Sweden. However, just as Margrete is about to slip out of the castle to rendezvous with Oluf and Asle, Jakob Nilsson and Roar arrive to see her, newly returned from their escapade in Prussia. They have learnt that the Teutonic Order is planning to invade mainland Sweden, and that the Order deliberately timed Oluf's release to cause maximum discord amongst the Scandinavian kingdoms and to wreck the mooted alliance with England and thereby leave the Kalmar Union vulnerable. Realising that the Union is more important in the face of the Teutonic threat than her personal feelings, Margrete betrays Oluf, who is quickly recaptured by Erik's men. She persuades Erik to spare Asle, but Oluf is publicly burned alive as a traitor in front of his mother. It is implied that, with Scandinavian unity restored, the Teutonic Order calls off its planned invasion.

The film ends with a brief text stating that the Kalmar Union lasted for a further century after Margrete's death, and claiming that the close affinity that exists to this day between the three Scandinavian nations is in large part thanks to her.

== Cast ==
- Trine Dyrholm as Margrete, Queen regent
- Søren Malling as Peder Jensen Lodehat, Bishop of Roskilde
- Morten Hee Andersen as King Erik
- Jakob Oftebro as Man from Graudenz
- Bjørn Floberg as Asle Jonsson, Norwegian Council leader
- Magnus Krepper as Johan Sparre, Swedish Council leader
- Thomas W. Gabrielsson as Jens Due, Danish Council leader
- Agnes Westerlund Rase as Astrid, a Swedish servant
- Simon J. Berger as Jakob Nilsson, a retainer
- Linus James Nilsson as Roar, a Danish pirate
- Halldóra Geirharðsdóttir as Hildur, an Icelandic wetnurse
- Annika Hallin as Malin, a servant
- Tinna Hrafnsdóttir as Sigrid
- Richard Sammel as Raberlin, a German trade envoy
- Paul Blackthorne as Sir William Bourcier

and

- Per Kjerstad as Elvar Sigurdsson
- Joen Højerslev as Folmer Jacobsen Lunge
- Diana Martinová as Princess Philippa
- Nicole Rosney as Margrete aged 8
- Ole Neimann as Bourcier's man
- Pavel Myslik as Valdemar Atterdag
- Curtis Matthew as Herald ("Herold")
- Rostislav Pastorek as Old Priest ("Gammel Praest")
- Ondrej Macek as Stable Boy ("Stalddreng")
- Mathilde Wedell-Wedellsborg as Lady of the Court ("Hofdame")

== Production ==
The film had a budget of about 73 million Danish kroner. The Danish Film Institute gave 20 million DKK to the production, which is the largest single grant in production aid it has ever made.

Production was badly hit by the coronavirus pandemic, as the film crew had only managed to complete 10 days of filming in Prague before having to stop on 12 March 2020 due to the virus outbreak. In order to save the production, the producers sought an extra 8.5 million DKK from Film i Väst, the Queen Margrethe & Prince Henrik Foundation, the A.P. Møller Fund, the Carlsberg Foundation and the Augustinus Fund.

== Release ==
The film premiered in Denmark on 16 September 2021. It had a limited theatrical release in North America and was released on VOD by Samuel Goldwyn Films on 17 December 2021. As of October 2024, the film is available to purchase on Amazon Prime Video in the United Kingdom, and made its television debut in the country on BBC Four on the 5th of October 2024.

== Reception ==
=== Box office ===
In its opening weekend, Margrete: Queen of the North grossed $unknown in North America and a total of $252,152 elsewhere internationally, against a production budget of about $9.8 million.

=== Critical response ===
On review aggregator Rotten Tomatoes, the film holds an approval rating of 95% based on 19 reviews, with an average rating of 7.4/10. On Metacritic, the film holds a score of 68 out of 100, based on 5 critics, indicating "generally favorable reviews". The magazine Ekko gave the film five stars out of six and called it an "impressive achievement in Danish film history." Berlingske Tidende gave Margrete: Queen of the North six out of six stars and wrote that the film was "the best film about Danish history in decades" and that it had a "superb cast of actors". Dagbladet Information described the story as "thorough, credible and focused", and the film as a whole as "visually and evocatively executed". Jyllands-Posten gave Margrete: Queen of the North five stars out of six and praised Trine Dyrholm's performance.
