= When Animals Dream =

- Original film poster showing its Danish title
- Directed by: Jonas Alexander Arnby
- Written by: Rasmus Birch
- Produced by: Ditte Milsted; Caroline Bingestam
- Starring: Lars Mikkelsen; Jakob Oftebro; Sonja Richter
- Cinematography: Niels Thastum
- Edited by: Peter Brandt
- Music by: Mikkel Hess
- Production company: AlphaVille Pictures Copenhagen
- Distributed by: Nordisk Film
- Release date: 19 May 2014 (Cannes Film Festival)
- Running time: 84 minutes
- Country: Denmark
- Language: Danish
- Budget: €4 million

When Animals Dream (Danish: Når dyrene drømmer) is a 2014 Danish horror drama film, and the feature film directorial debut of Jonas Alexander Arnby. The film had its world premiere on 19 May 2014 at the Cannes Film Festival and stars Sonia Suhl as a teenager that discovers that she is transforming into a werewolf.

== Plot ==
Marie (Sonia Suhl) is a shy sixteen-year-old growing up in a remote fishing village in Denmark where she lives with her father Thor (Lars Mikkelsen) and mother (Sonja Richter), who is catatonic. She is disturbed by a strange rash that develops on her chest, and becomes still more unnerved when she begins to sprout hair. During this time Marie begins working at a fish processing plant where her coworkers bully her under the false premise that it is hazing and not intended to be malicious. As Marie's body undergoes more changes, she begins to realize that her family has been hiding strange secrets and that her mother's current condition may relate to what Marie is currently going through.

== Cast ==
- Sonia Suhl as Marie
- Lars Mikkelsen as Thor
- Jakob Oftebro as Daniel
- Sonja Richter as Mother
- Mads Riisom as Felix
- Benjamin Boe Rasmussen as Ib
- Esben Dalgaard as Bjarne

== Reception ==
Critical reception for When Animals Dream has been generally positive. On the review aggregator website Rotten Tomatoes, 71% of 21 critics' reviews are positive. The website's consensus reads: "This Danish feast may leave you wanting more, but When Animals Dream remains a solid attempt to redefine female adolescence through a lycanthropic lens." On Metacritic, the film has a weighted average score of 54 out of 100 based on 10 critics, which the site labels as "mixed or average" reviews.

Shock Till You Drop compared the film favorably with the similarly themed films Let the Right One In and Ginger Snaps and commented that it was "a movie that lurks quietly in the shadows, stalking you until its ready to pounce and show you what big, sharp teeth it has". The Hollywood Reporter and Twitch Film also praised the movie, and Twitch Film wrote that it was "a tremendous feature debut, haunting and elegiac, while not shying away from violence and sex. There is certainly no subtlety to the film; but then again, werewolves aren't meant to be subtle."
