= Megaheavy =

- Directed by: Fenar Ahmad
- Screenplay by: Jacob Katz Hansen, Fenar Ahmad
- Produced by: Thomas Yong (producer), Morten Revsgaard Frederiksen, Peter Hyldahl (executive producers)
- Starring: Eva Thompson, Jonatan Tulested
- Cinematography: Niels A. Hansen
- Edited by: Martin Nygaard Friis Hansen
- Distributed by: Nordisk Film / Super16
- Release date: 2010
- Running time: 19 minutes
- Country: Denmark
- Language: Danish

Megaheavy is a 19-minute Danish youth short film produced in 2010 by Shouting Cow Productions. It is written by Jacob Katz Hansen and Fenar Ahmad and directed by the latter and starring Eva Thompson in the role of Jolly, Jonatan Tulested as Kenneth, with additional roles by Sarah Boberg and Nicolei Faber.

== Synopsis ==
The nerdy Jolly (played by Eva Thompson) is in love with Kenneth (Jonatan Tulested), an earlier classmate and she is engulfed in her love of metal music. A neighbor's son (played by Nicolei Faber) returns to the village upon hearing about his father's death, and things are no longer the same.

== Soundtrack ==
The soundtrack is built on tracks by U.S. rock band The Fucking Champs, with progressive metal genre. The soundtrack was published by Drag City.

Tracklist

1. "What's a Litte Reign?" - Lyrics & Music: Tim Soete, Tim Green, Josh Smith
2. "Extra Man" - Lyrics & Music: Tim Soete, Tim Green, Josh Smith
3. "The Virtues of Cruising" - Lyrics & Music: Tim Soete, Tim Green, Philip Manley
4. "Insomnia" - Lyrics & Music: Tim Soete, Tim Green, Philip Manley
5. "Lamplighter" - Lyrics & Music: Tim Soete, Tim Green, Josh Smith
6. "Fozzy Goes to Africa" - Lyrics & Music: Tim Soete, Tim Green, Philip Manley

== Awards ==
It won the Grand Prix at the 2010 Odense Film Festival as well as the "Best children's and youth films" category at the same festival. It won The Robert - Danish Film Awards - for "Best short fiction or animated film" during the 27th Robert Awards the same year. It won "Honorable Mention - Short Film" at the Stockholm International Film Festival and "Special Mention for Short film" at the Edinburgh International Film Festival. Film got award nominations as well including for "Generation 14plus - Best Short Film" during the Berlin International Film Festival. Eva Thompson was nominated for "Best Actress" and Martin Nygaard Friis Hansen for "Best Editing" both during the 2010 Ekko Shortlist Awards (2010).
