= All Inclusive (2014 film) =

- Film poster
- Directed by: Hella Joof
- Starring: Mikael Birkkjær; Rasmus Bjerg; Bodil Jørgensen; Danica Curcic
- Release date: 25 December 2014
- Running time: 90 minutes
- Country: Denmark
- Language: Danish

All Inclusive is a 2014 Danish comedy film directed by Hella Joof. It stars Bodil Jørgensen, Danica Curcic, Maria Rossing, Carsten Bjørnlund, Mikael Birkkjær, Rasmus Bjerg and Diogo Infante.

== Plot ==
After learning that her husband has been unfaithful, Lise travels to Malta with her daughters, Ditte and Sigrid, to celebrate her 60th birthday. The sisters, who have very different personalities, try to cheer up their mother, but the holiday takes a turn towards jealousy, family rivalry, and an unexpected love triangle with Antonio, a local bartender.

== Cast ==
- Mikael Birkkjær as Mogens
- Rasmus Bjerg as Henrik
- Carsten Bjørnlund as Anders
- Danica Curcic as Ditte
- Diogo Infante as Antonio
- Bodil Jørgensen as Lise
- Mia Lyhne as Tina
- Maria Rossing as Sigrid

== Remake ==
A French remake titled Dumped (Larguées in French speaking markets) was released in 2018. The film was directed by Éloïse Lang, co-written by Lang, Philippe Lefebvre, Camille Moreau and Olivier Treiner, and stars Miou-Miou, Camille Cottin and Camille Chamoux.
