= Dar Salim =

Danish actor (born 1977)

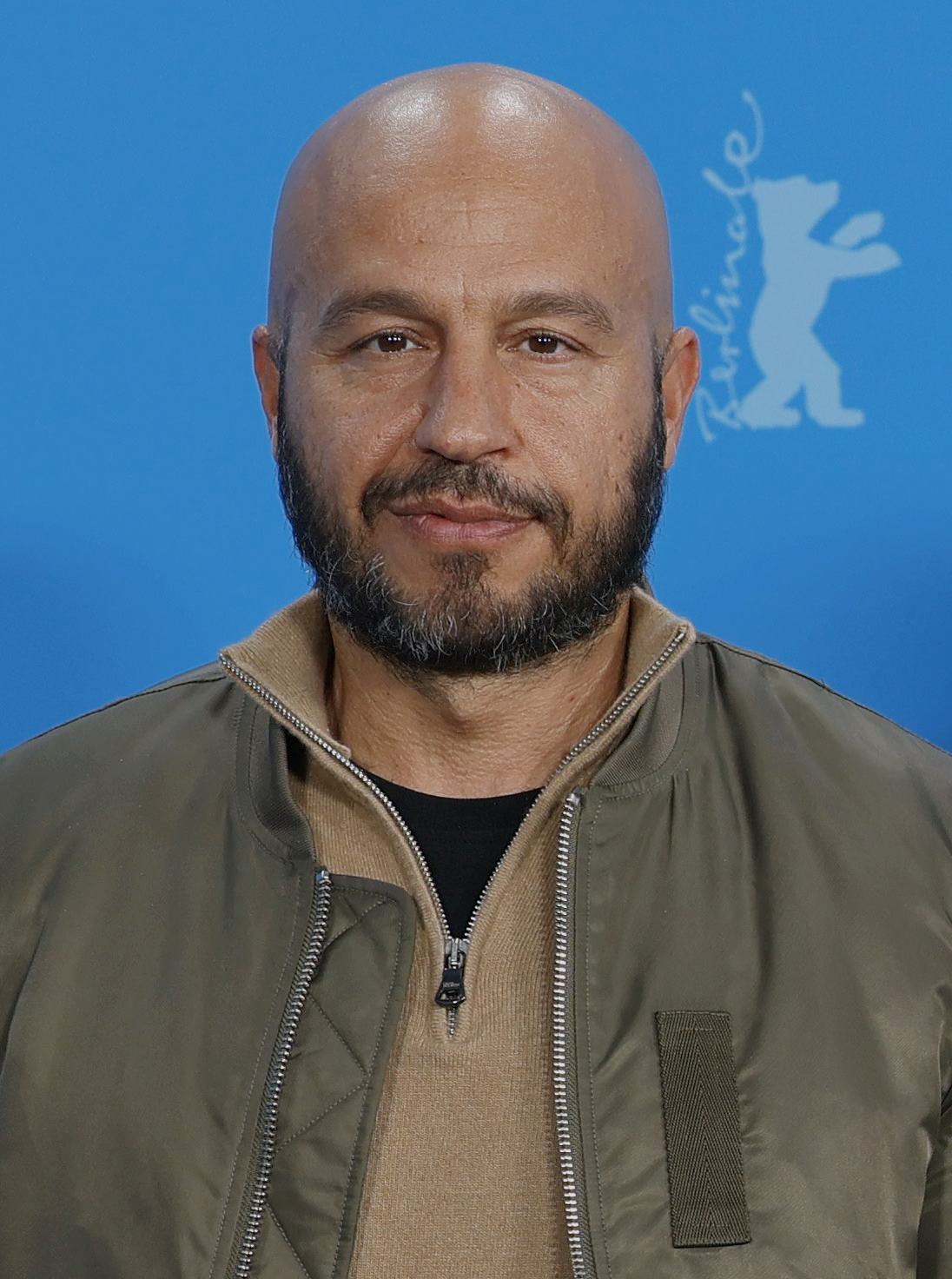
- Salim in 2024
- Born: 18 August 1977 (age 49); Baghdad, Iraq
- Education: William Esper Studio
- Occupation: Actor
- Years active: 2003–present

Dar Salim (born 18 August 1977) is an Iraqi-born Danish actor. He became known for his role as Green Party chairman Amir Diwan in the Danish TV series Borgen, and starred in Guy Ritchie's 2023 film The Covenant.

== Early life ==
Salim was born on 18 August 1977 in Baghdad, Iraq. He fled to Denmark as a six-year-old refugee and lived on the island of Amager.

== Career ==
Salim trained at the William Esper Studio in New York City and studied method acting in London. He also had private lessons with Danish actress Sarah Boberg.

His acting career started with being cast in TV2's television series Forsvar. The role that probably gave him the greatest exposure among Danish television viewers was as the Green Party chairman Amir Diwan in Borgen. In early 2013, he presented TV2's Good Evening Denmark.

He starred in TV2's crime drama Dicte, for which he received a Best Supporting Actor nomination at the Robert Awards.

Salim had recurring roles in Danish thrillers The Bridge and Below the Surface. He co-starred in the Swedish TV series Springfloden (Spring Tide).

In 2023 Salim starred alongside Jake Gyllenhaal in Guy Ritchie's The Covenant as Ahmed Abdullah, an Afghan interpreter. The following year, he appeared in Ritchie's series The Gentlemen.

== Filmography ==
=== Feature films ===
Year	Title	Role	Director
2008	Go With Peace, Jamil	Jamil	Omar Shargawi
2010	Submarino	Goran	Thomas Vinterberg
2010	My Good Enemy	Gym Teacher	Oliver Ussing
2010	Nothing's All Bad	Aversion Therapist	Mikkel Munch-Fals
2010	Truth About Men	Christian	Nikolaj Arcel
2011	The Devil's Double	Azzam Al-Tikriti	Lee Tamahori
2011	Rebounce	Hans	Heidi Maria Faisst
2011	Love Is in the Air	Benny	Simon Staho
2012	A Hijacking	Lars Vestergaard	Tobias Lindholm
2013	IRL: In Real Life	Mikael	Jonas Elmer
2014	The Christmas Family	School Inspector	Carsten Rudolf
2014	Exodus: Gods and Kings	Commander Khyan	Ridley Scott
2014	Head Full of Honey	Waiter	Til Schweiger
2015	A War	Najib Bisma	Tobias Lindholm
2015	Macho Man	Cem	Christof Wahl
2015	Iqbal & the Secret Recipe	Uncle Rafiq	Tilde Harkamp
2016	Walk with Me	Sami (Doctor)	Lisa Ohlin
2016	Iqbal & the Superchip	Uncle Rafiq	Oliver Zahle
2017	Darkland	Zaid	Fenar Ahmad
2017	Lommbock	10 Jahre Bau	Christian Zübert
2017	Next Door Spy	Vincent's Father^{V}	Karla von Bengtson
2018	Iqbal & the Jewel of India	Uncle Rafiq	Oliver Zahle
2018	Until We Fall	Adam	Samanou Acheche Sahlstrøm
2019	Heavy Load	Himself	Magnus Millang
2020	Curveball	Rafid Alwan	Johannes Naber
2022	Black Crab	Malik	Adam Berg
2022	Loving Adults	Christian Holm	Barbara Rothenborg
2023	Darkland: The Return	Zaid	Fenar Ahmad
2023	The Covenant	Ahmed Abdullah Yousfi	Guy Ritchie
2024	Sons	Rami	Gustav Möller

=== Short films ===
Year	Title	Role	Director(s)
2006	The Idea of an Uncomplicated Life with a Man	Taxi Driver	Ib & Jørgen Kastrup
2011	Karim	Telephone Voice^{V}	Ulaa Salim
2013	Escort	Alex	Jonas Grum
2014	Everything Goes to Plan	Minister of Justice / Terrorist	Magne Pettersen
2014	Void	Amir	Milad Alami & Aygul Bakanova

=== TV series ===
Year	Title	Role	Notes
2003	Forsvar	Taxi driver	Episode 10
2009	Livvagterne	Ammar Hayat	Episodes 5-6
2009	2900 Happiness	Pilot 2	Episodes 95 and 101
2010	Borgen	Amir Diwan	
2011	Game of Thrones	Qotho	Season 1
2013	Dicte	Bo Skytte	
2013	The Bridge	Peter Thaulou	
2014	Tatort	Hassan Nidal	Episode "Brüder"
2015	American Odyssey	Omar	
2016	Spring Tide	Abbas El Fassi	
2016	Spuren der Rache	Hassan	
2017	Below the Surface	Adel	
2018	Warrior	CC	
2018	Trapped	Jamal Al Othman	
2021	Face to Face	C.C.	
2022	Drenge	Mikael	
2024	The Gentlemen	Felix	Episode: "Tackle Tommy Woo Woo"
2025	The Terminal List: Dark Wolf	Mohammed Farooq	Recurring role
2026	High Value Target: The Hunt for Saddam	Samir	3 episodes
2026	The Terminal List	Mohammed Farooq	Recurring role (season 2)
