= Flow (2014 film) =

- Theatrical release poster
- Ækte vare (Danish)
- Directed by: Fenar Ahmad
- Screenplay by: Anders Ølholm
- Produced by: Nina Bisgaard, Morten Kjems Juhl
- Starring: Kian Rosenberg Larsson; Ali Sivandi; Rasmus Hammerich; Marijana Jankovic; Maria Erwolter; Benny Jamz; Lirim Jusufi; Sivas Torbati
- Cinematography: Niels A. Hansen
- Edited by: Martin Nygaard Friis Hansen
- Music by: Jens Ole Wowk, Jens Ole McCoy
- Distributed by: United International Pictures
- Release date: 8 May 2014
- Country: Denmark
- Language: Danish

Flow (Danish: Ækte vare, lit. Genuine) is a 2014 film by Danish film director Fenar Ahmad based on a screenplay by Anders Ølholm. Already known for his short films, this is Fenar Ahmad's debut feature film.

== Synopsis ==
Mikael (played by Danish rapper Gilli grew up in Brøndby Strand an impoverished large housing project area with high concentration of immigrants. Together with Tariq, Samir and Eddy, he has a dream of living making music and rapping. They are a cohesive crew that sticks together and the crew members defend each other at all costs. Mikael is the group's talent, and more serious than the others. That's what the older incumbent rapper, Apollo, sees in him. As Apollo needs help in making a comeback, he hires Mikael to write his songs. While Apollo introduces Mikael for the hub and excesses of the music world and partying, tours, abundance of ladies, his earlier friends begin to doubt Mikael's loyalty to them. At the same time, Apollo is beginning to understand that Mikael's talent is far greater than his own - and Apollo is in no way interested in letting Mikael in the foreground. But real talent is hard to hold down and the showdown is inevitable.

== Cast ==
- Kian Rosenberg Larsson (aka Gilli) as Mikael
- Ali Sivandi as Tariq
- Lirim Jusufi as Samir
- Benny Jamz as Eddie
- Rasmus Hammerich as Apollo
- Sivas Torbati as S!vas
- Hassan El Sayed as Hussein
- Hilal Anyabo as Hilal
- Marijana Jankovic as Jelana
- Frederik Christian Johansen as Jens
- Maria Erwolter as Mor
- Casper Sloth as Christian
- Morten Ruben Sørensen as Klaus
- Mikkel Arndt as fitter
- Ediz Caliskan as Rapper
- Ana Maria Solbjerg as Asra
- Songul Aras as Baseema
- Reza Sivandi as Tariq's father
- Eysar Al-Jadri as Tariq's mother
- Adam Al-Jadri as Tariq's small brother
- Esat Ünal as a DJ
- Reza Forghani as a DJ
- Idris Ahmad as Rashid
- Kata Jankovic as Jelana's mother

== Soundtrack ==
The soundtrack for the film was released on 1 April 2014 on ArtPeople with rap music by Gilli, and additional music by MellemFingaMuzik, Murro, KESI, Højer Øye (known by stage name Benny Jamz), Reza Forghani and rapper S!vas. It also contains music by music producer Jens Ole McCoy also known as Carmon (part of the Danish hip hop duo Ukendt Kunstner).

The soundtrack album charted on the Danish Hitlisten Albums Chart peaking at number 8.

=== Tracklist ===
1. "Grå Dage" (Gilli feat. Murro) (2.40)
2. "Knokler Hårdt (Gilli) (4.05)
3. "Ung Entreprenør" (Gilli feat. MellemFingaMuzik) (5:57)
4. "Hele Igennem" (Gilli feat. KESI & Højer Øye) (4:21)
5. "Hårde Tider" (Gilli feat. Højer Øye) (3:50)
6. "Penge Kommer Går" (Gilli 3:41)
7. "Trykker Sedler" (Gilli feat. S!vas & MellemFingaMuzik) (5:23)
8. "Alt Jeg Har Set" (Gilli feat. Murro) (3:59)

== Reception ==
Soundvenues reviewer Jacob Ludvigsen gave the film four out of six possible stars. Ekko Filmmagasinet's Nikolaj Mangurten Rubin also gave it 4 stars.

=== Award nominations ===
The film was nominated for six awards:

- New Talent Grand PIX for film director Fenar Ahmad during the 2014 CPH PIX Aiards
- Audience Award for the film during the 2015 Danish Film Awards (Robert)
- The Robert (award) for "Best Children/Youth Film" for the film during the 2015 Danish Film Awards (Robert)
- The Robert (award) for "Best Sound" for Peter Albrechtsen during the 2015 Danish Film Awards (Robert)
- The Zulu Award for Best Film for Fenar Ahmad during 2015 Zulu Awards
- Best Supporting Actor for Ali Sivandi during the Bodil Awards 2015
