= Nordic Media Days =

International media conference

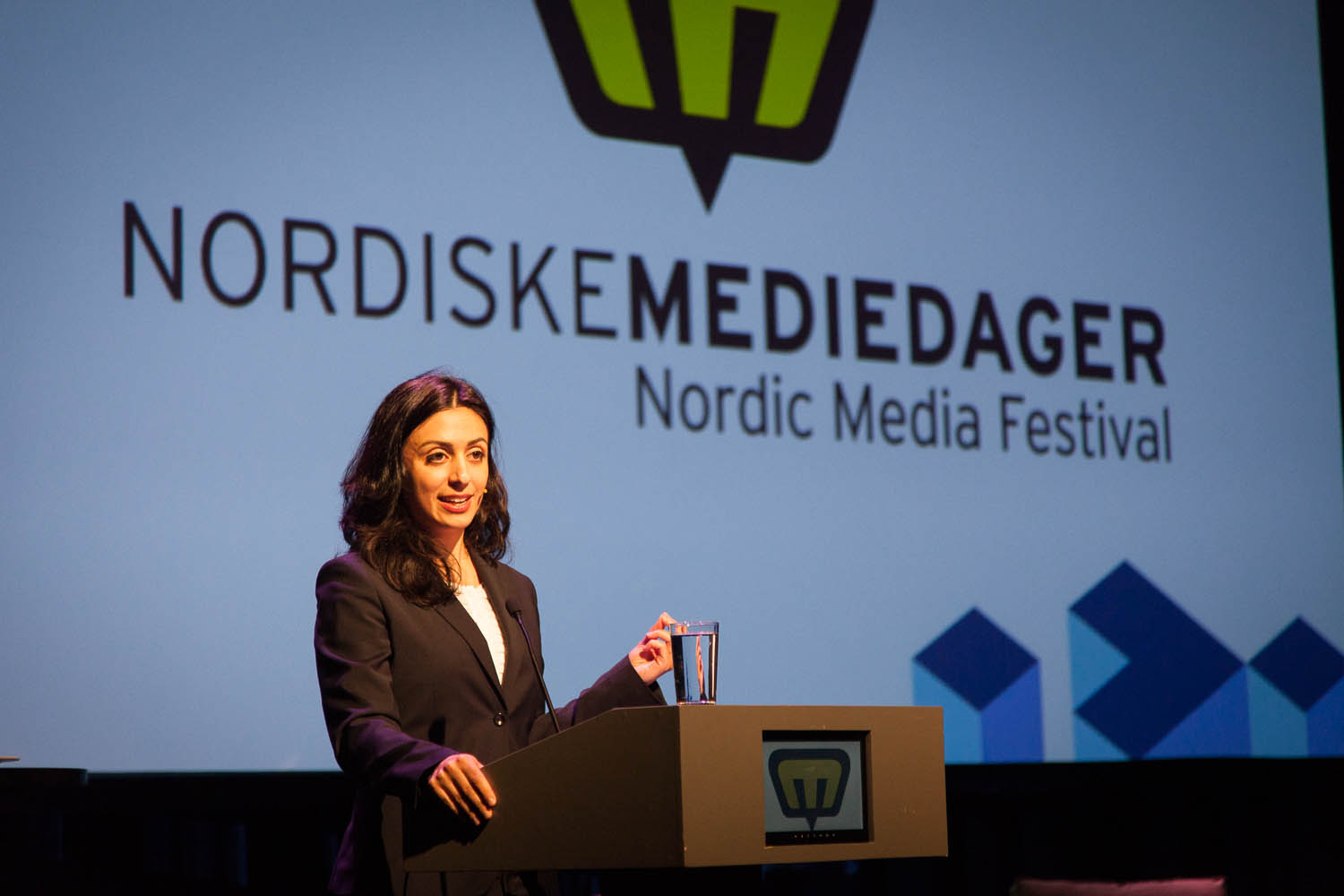
Minister of Culture opens The Nordic Media Festival 2013

The Nordic Media Festival is the largest media conference in the Nordic region.

Held annually in Bergen, Norway, the Festival features 100 speakers, and around 1,860 delegates attend, representing the full spectrum of the industry. Founded in 1988, the festival is a non-profit foundation. In addition to the conference and unique networking events, a variety of projects are organized for high-school students: NMD Ung gives youth an opportunity to increase their competence and gain access to the media industry. The festival culminates in the Gullruten Award Show, the Norwegian equivalent of the Emmy Awards.

== Previous speakers ==
Some of the previous speakers at the conference:

- Adam B. Ellick, Senior Video Correspondent, The New York Times
- Brad Berens, Advisor and Principal at Big Digital Idea Consulting
- Gunilla Herlitz, CEO Bonnier News, Dagens Nyheter, Dagens Industri and Expressen
- Tim Pool, Director of Media Innovation Fusion
- Louise Roug, Global News Editor, Mashable
- Alan Sepinwall, Writer and TV critic
- Lola Landekic and Will Perkins, Editors of Art of the Title
- Dana Chivvis, producer of Serial
- Dee Forbes, President and Managing Director of Discovery Networks Western Europe
- Chad Oakes and Michael Frislev, producers of Fargo
- Kelly Merryman, Vice President of Content Acquisition, Netflix
- Ilene Landress, Executive Producer of Girls
- Maria and Andre Jacquemetton, Writers and Executive Producers, Mad Men
- Claudia Weinstein, Story Editor, 60 Minutes
- Simon Sutton, President, HBO International and Content Distribution
- Gareth Neame, Executive Producer, Downton Abbey
- Rory Albanese, Writer and Executive Producer, The Daily Show
- Piv Bernth, Executive Producer of the Danish TV series The Killing and The Bridge
- Jeff Jarvis, Blogger and author
- Louis Theroux, Documentarist
- Matt Stone and Trey Parker, Creators of South Park
- Elisabeth Murdoch, CEO, Shine
- Jeffrey Cole, Director, Center for the Digital Future, Annenberg
- Lord Michael Dobbs, Executive Producer and author House of Cards
- Adam Price, creator of Borgen
- Clay Shirky, Author and Internet evangelist
- Aron Pilhofer, Editor Interactive News, New York Times
- Robert G. Picard, Director of Research, Reuters Institute for the Study of Journalism
- Raju Narisetti, SVP and Deputy Head of Strategy at News Corp.
- Meredith Bennett & Opus Moreschi, Executive Producer and Head Writer, The Colbert Report
- Professor Hans Rosling, TEDtalk favorite
- Sagar Savla, Computer Science researcher and Product executive, Google
- Peter Lord, Creative Director and Co-owner of Aardman Animations
- Alan Rusbridger, Editor, The Guardian
- Steve Rasch, Picture Editor for Curb Your Enthusiasm
- Tristan Davies, Executive Editor, The Sunday Times
- Brian Seth Hurst, CEO, The Opportunity Management Group
- Betsy Hubbard & Debra Jasper, Mindset Digital
- Brian Storm, CEO, MediaStorm
- Jonathan Spencer, Creative Director, BBC News
- Baratunde Thurston, Writer and Director of Digital, The Onion
- Mario García, Designer, Garcia Media
- Keri Lewis Brown, Managing Director, K7 Media
- Photographer Todd Stanley and Deck boss Edgar Hansen, Deadliest Catch
- Juan Antonio Giner, President, Innovation International Media Consulting Group
- Magnús Scheving aka "Sportacus", LazyTown Entertainment
- Lucy Bowden, Executive Producer, Dragonfly Film & TV Productions Ltd.
- Linda Green, Head of BBC's Creative Leadership Programme, BBC Academy
- Nakhle El Hage, Director of News and Current Affairs, Al Arabiya News Channel
- Sven Martin, Visual Effects Supervisor, Pixomondo, (Game of Thrones)
- Tom McDonnell, Commercial Director, Monterosa
- Matthew McGregor, Associate VP for Strategy & Political Director, Blue State Digital
- Kevin Mundye, Consultant Executive Producer, Shine Global
- Mariana Santos, Digital Media & Graphic Designer, The Guardian
- Sam Tomlinson, Director, PwC
- Matt Locke, Director, Storythings
- Liv Ullmann, Actor and Director
- Evgeny Morozov, Writer
- Alexa Fogel, Casting Director, The Wire
- Tim Plyming, Project Executive, Digital & Editor Live Sites, BBC's London 2012 Olympic Team
- Justin Scroggie, Format Doctor, The Format People Group
- Joeri van den Bergh, Co-Founder, Insites Consulting
- Tyler Brûlé, publisher, Wallpaper and Monocle
- Peter Barron, Director of External Relations, Google
- Sarah Cohen, Pulitzer Winner and Knight Professor, Duke University
- Donal McIntyre, Undercover Journalist, DareFilms
- Russell Viers, Coach, Russelviers.com
- Mani, Photojournalist, France / Syria
- Vikram Gandhi, Director, Kumaré, Disposable TV
- Gerd Leonhard, CEO, The Futures Agency
- Lina Ben Mhenni, Blogger, A Tunisian Girl
- Claire O'Connor, Director, Discovery Networks, EMEA Insights & Innovation
- Andy Dickinson, Senior Lecturer, University of Central Lancashire
- Christopher Sopher, Student, University of North Carolina
- Michael Bull, Professor, University of Sussex
- Sami Sockol, Freelancer, The Washington Post
- Andrew DeVigal, Director of Multimedia, The New York Times
- Richard McKerrow, Creative Director, Love Productions
- Amanda Cox, Graphic Designer, The New York Times
- Tim Crescenti, President, Small World
- John Ellis, Professor, Royal Holloway College
- Rob Evans, Journalist, The Guardian
- Jonathan Marks, Director, Critical Distance BV
- Yvonne Ridley, Journalist, Press TV
- Julia Dimambro, Managing Director EMEA/APAC, Cherry Media Holdings
- Bob Drogin, Pulitzer Winner and Staff Writer, The Los Angeles Times
- Javier Errea, Designer, Errea Communication
- Adrian Holovaty, Founder, Everyblock.com
- Andrew Keen, Writer, "Cult of the Amateur: How today's Internet is killing our culture"
- Christina Lamb, Correspondent and Author, "Small Wars Permitting"
- Peter McEvoy, Executive Producer and Supervisor EP Factual, ABC Television
- Virginia Mouseler, Chief Executive Officer, The WIT
- Aye Chan Naing, Director, Democratic Voice of Burma
- Deborah Scranton, Journalist and Filmmaker, The War Tapes, Clover & a Bee Films
- Jürgen Scheible, Artist & Scientist, Media Lab, University of Art and Design, Helsinki
- Ben Hammersley, Journalist, The Guardian
- Johnny Keeling, Producer, BBC
- John Lynch, Head of Science and History, BBC
- Irshad Manji, Journalist and Writer, Refusenik
- Angie Mason, Producer, Films of Record Ltd.
- Richard Porter, Head of News, BBC World News
- Ben Frow, Controller of Feature and Entertainment, Channel Five
- Joel Mishcon, Director and Producer, Chrome Productions
- Maher Othman, Editor of Politics, Al hayat TV
- William Uricchio, Professor, Massachusetts Institute of Technology
