= Darkland (2017 film) =

2017 film

- Film poster
- Directed by: Fenar Ahmad
- Written by: Fenar Ahmad; Adam August
- Produced by: Jacob Jarek
- Starring: Dar Salim
- Distributed by: Scanbox Entertainment
- Release date: 19 January 2017
- Running time: 112 minutes
- Country: Denmark
- Language: Danish

Darkland (Danish: Underverden) is a 2017 Danish crime thriller film directed by Fenar Ahmad. It was shortlisted as one of the three films to be selected as the potential Danish submission for the Academy Award for Best Foreign Language Film at the 90th Academy Awards. However, You Disappear was selected as the Danish entry. A sequel, entitled Darkland: The Return, was released in 2023.

== Cast ==
- Dar Salim as Zaid
- Stine Fischer Christensen as Stine
- Ali Sivandi as Semion
- Dulfi Al-Jabouri as Alex
- Jakob Ulrik Lohmann as Torben
- Roland Møller as Claus
- B. Branco as Branco
