= Jakob Oftebro =

Norwegian actor

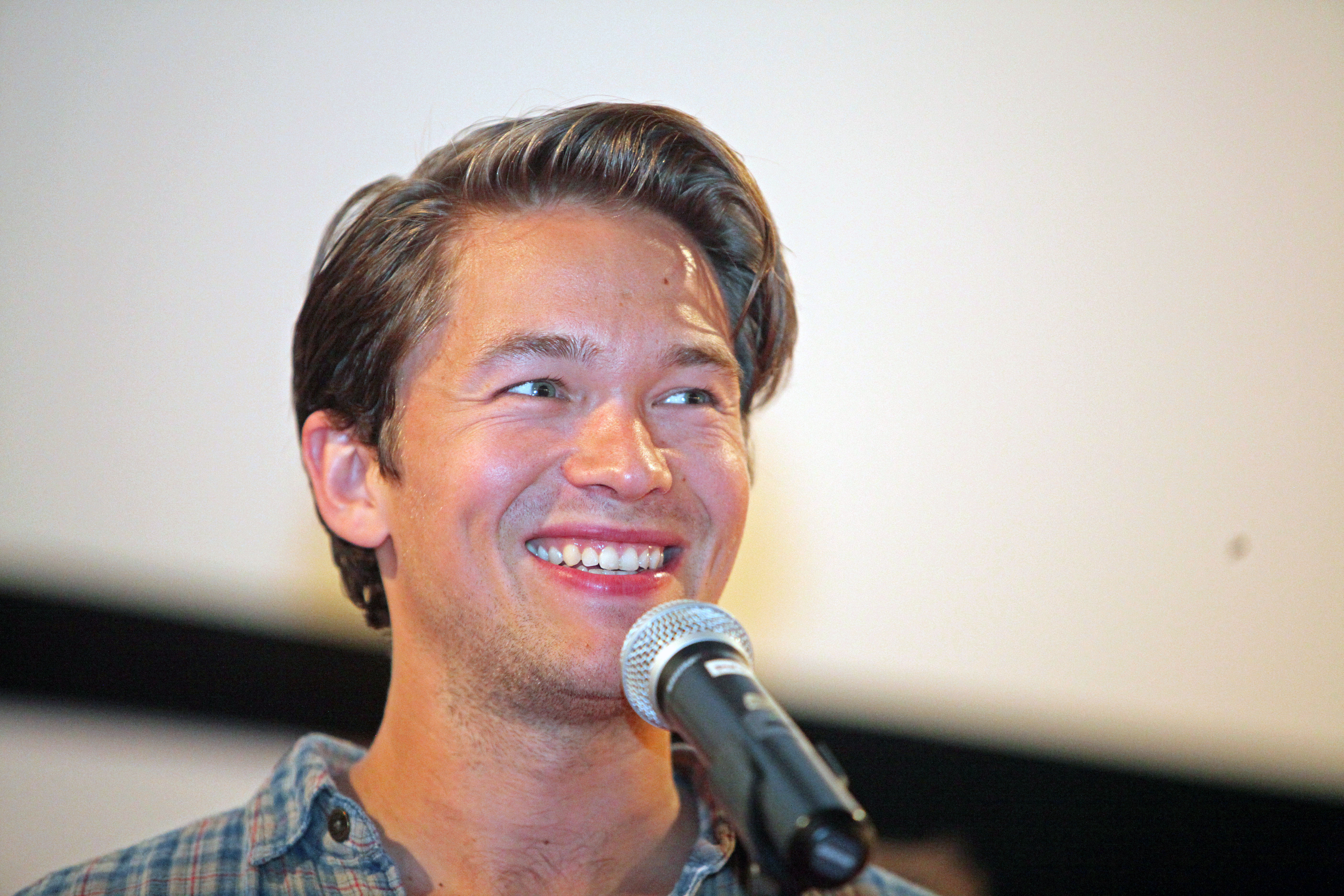
- Oftebro at the Karlovy Vary International Filmfestival in July 2015
- Born: Jakob Hoff Oftebro; 12 January 1986 (age 40); Oslo, Norway
- Occupation: Actor
- Years active: 2004-present
- Parents: Nils Ole Oftebro (father); Kaja Korsvold (mother)

Jakob Hoff Oftebro (born 12 January 1986) is a Norwegian actor. He has appeared in more than twenty films since 2004 including Hamilton and Kon-Tiki, which was nominated for the Academy Award for Best Foreign Language Film at the 85th Academy Awards.

In 2014, he was cast as a lead in the Danish television production of 1864, a war epic. The series made headlines in Scandinavia due to its massive budget, one of the largest in Danish television history.

Jakob's half-brother is actor Jonas Hoff Oftebro (born 7 May 1996, Oslo), the son of Nils Ole Oftebro and Anette Hoff.

== Selected filmography ==
=== Film ===
Year	Title	Role	Notes
2004	Bare Bea	Jørgen	
2008	Max Manus	Lars Emil Erichsen	
2011	Varg Veum - Svarte får	Asbjørn Søvold	
2012	Kon-Tiki	Torstein Raaby	
2012	Journey to the Christmas Star	Ole	
2013	Victoria	Johannes	
2013	Mordene i Fjällbacka: Tyskerungen	Hans Olavsen	
2013	Tarok	Ulf Thorsen	
2013	Solan og Ludvig - Jul i Flåklypa	Postmannen	Voice role
2014	When Animals Dream	Daniel	
2014	In Order of Disappearance	Aron Horowitz	
2014	Lev Stærkt	Martin	
2015	The Shamer's Daughter	Nicodemus Ravens	
2015	Guldkysten	Wullf, Botanist	
2016	Tordenskiold	Tordenskiold	
2016	The Last King	Skjervald	
2016	A Conspiracy of Faith	Pasgård	
2017	Tom of Finland	Jack	
2017	Disappearance	Johnny	
2017	The Snowman	Superintendent Skarre	
2019	The Shamer's Daughter II: Gift of the Snake	Nicodemus Ravens	
2020	The Day We Died (Danish: Krudttønden)	Jan	
2020	Den største forbrytelsen	Charles	
2021	Margrete den Første	Oluf	
2026	The Fall of Sir Douglas Weatherford †	TBA	Post-production

=== Television ===
Year	Title	Role	Notes
2004	Skolen	Jacob	3 episodes
2010	Hvaler	Mikkel Olsen	6 episodes
2013-2014	Lilyhammer	Chris	6 episodes
2013	The Bridge	Mads Nielsen	3 episodes
2014	1864	Laust Jensen	Main role
2015-2017	Unge lovende	Anders	8 episodes
2018	Warrior	Peter	6 episodes
2018	Rig 45	Halvar	6 Episodes
2020	Agent Hamilton	Carl Hamilton	Main role
2020	Norsemen (Norwegian: Vikingane)	Arnstein	
2020	The Letter for the King	Crown Prince Iridian	
2023	Face to Face	Rupert Lang	
2026	Bytet (A Couple of Lies)	Adam Harris	Main role; 4 episodes
