= Stine Fischer Christensen =

Danish actress (born 1985)

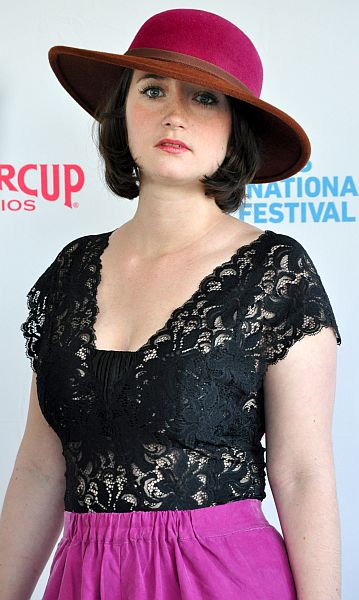
- Stine Fischer Christensen
- Born: 1985 (age 40–41)
- Occupation: Actress
- Years active: 1997–present

Stine Fischer Christensen (born 3 February 1985) is a Danish actress. She has appeared in more than fifteen films since 1997. For her performance as Anna Louisa Hansson in After the Wedding she won the Bodil and Robert Award for Best Actress in a Supporting Role.

== Selected filmography ==
Film
Year	Title	Role	Notes
2006	After the Wedding	Anna Louisa Hansson	
2007	Echo	Angelique	
2011	Cracks in the Shell	Josephine Lorenz	
2017	Darkland	Stine	
2020	Valhalla	Frigg	

TV
Year	Title	Role	Notes
2005	Young Andersen	Sofie	

== Awards ==
- Bodil Award for Best Actress in a Supporting Role (2006)
- Robert Award for Best Actress in a Supporting Role (2007)
