= Silent Heart =

2014 film

- Theatrical poster
- Stille hjerte
- Directed by: Bille August
- Written by: Christian Torpe
- Produced by: Jesper Morthorst
- Starring: Ghita Nørby; Morten Grunwald; Paprika Steen; Jens Albinus; Danica Curcic; Pilou Asbæk
- Cinematography: Dirk Brüel
- Edited by: Anne Østerud; Janus Billeskov Jansen
- Music by: Annette Focks
- Production company: SF Film
- Distributed by: Level K (Scandinavia)
- Release dates: 20 September 2014 (Spain); 13 November 2014 (Denmark)
- Running time: 98 minutes
- Country: Denmark
- Language: Danish
- Budget: DKK 13 mio

Silent Heart (Danish: Stille hjerte, Quiet heart) is a 2014 Danish drama film directed by Bille August, and starring Ghita Nørby, Morten Grunwald, Paprika Steen, and Jens Albinus. The film was nominated for the 2015 Nordic Council Film Prize.

== Plot ==
A family of three generations gather over a weekend to say goodbye to Esther who suffers from an incurable disease, amyotrophic lateral sclerosis, and with the help of her husband Poul has chosen to pursue euthanasia when the weekend is over. But as the end approaches, the mother's decision becomes more and more difficult to handle for the daughters Heidi and Sanne, and old conflicts come to the surface.

== Cast ==
- Ghita Nørby as Esther
- Morten Grunwald as Poul
- Paprika Steen as Heidi
- Danica Curcic as Sanne
- Jens Albinus as Michael
- Pilou Asbæk as Dennis
- Vigga Bro as Lisbeth
- Oskar Sælan Halskov as Jonathan

== Themes ==
The topic of August's film is euthanasia. The film is a family drama about three generations coming together over a weekend to say goodbye to their wife, mother, mother in law, grandmother and friend.

== Release ==
The film premièred 20 September 2014 at the San Sebastián International Film Festival where it received a 20 minutes standing ovation. It was released theatrically in Denmark 13 November 2014.

== Reception ==
Film critic Morten Piil in Filmmagasinet Ekko gave the film 5 out of 6 stars and wrote: "All in all, Silent Heart is Bille August's most complete film since The Best Intentions." Jonathan Holland for The Hollywood Reporter wrote positively from San Sebastián that "After the disappointing Night Train to Lisbon, Heart signals a return to form for the former Oscar-winner Bille August, who here explores with practised ease and an alertness the emotional truth of the dynamics of an ordinarily neurotic family in an extraordinary situation. Accessible without being easy, and played to perfection by a superbly directed cast, Heart looks set to beat at festivals and in the European arthouse."

Jay Weissberg for Variety on the other hand wrote that "Silent Heart is a standard-issue tearjerker about a dying matriarch gathering her family around on the weekend she plans to off herself. The only surprise is when the script goes from merely stereotyped to spectacularly silly with a late revelation that would feel idiotic even in a farfetched 1940s meller."
