= Danish Writers Guild =

- Danske Dramatikere
- Founded: 9 March 1906
- Headquarters: Copenhagen, Denmark
- Location: Denmark
- Members: c. 300
- Key people: Jesper B. Karlsen Chairman; Nikolaj Scherfig VP
- Affiliations: Nordic Writers Guild
- Website: dramatiker.dk

Danish Writers Guild (Danish: Danske Dramatikere, literally: Danish Dramatists) is a trade union for playwrights and screenwriters in theatre, radio, television and film, and for translators of drama and librettists.

The Guild was founded 9 March 1906 as Danske Dramatikeres Forbund (Danish Dramatists' Union) at the initiative of playwright Emma Gad with the aim of serving the dramatists the copyright that had been secured by the Berne Convention from 1886 which Denmark joined in the 1903.

Danish Writers Guild is both a member of Nordic Writers Guild, whose main purpose is to support Nordic playwrights' rights and fulfil their general economic interests globally, and of Fédération des Scénaristes d'Europe (Federation of European Screen Writers).

The Guild today has more than 300 members.
