= 38th Robert Awards =

2021 Danish film awards ceremony

- Date: 6 February 2021
- Organized by: Danish Film Academy

Highlights
- Best Film: Another Round
- Most awards: Film; Another Round and Riders of Justice (4); Television; Cry Wolf (5)
- Most nominations: Film; Riders of Justice (15); Television; Cry Wolf (5)

The 38th Robert Awards ceremony, presented by Danish Film Academy, took place on 6 February 2021 virtually to honour the best in Danish film and television of 2020.

== Winners and nominees ==
The nominations were announced on 6 January 2021. Winners are listed first, highlighted in boldface, and indicated with a double dagger (‡).

=== Film ===
**Best Danish Film**: **Another Round – Producers: Sisse Graum Jørgensen and Kasper Dissing; Director: Thomas Vinterberg; Script: Thomas Vinterberg and Tobias Lindholm**‡; Enforcement – Producers: Morten Kaufmann and Signe Leick Jensen; Directors and Script: Anders Ølholm and Frederik Louis Hviid; The Good Traitor – Producer: Jonas Frederiksen; Director: Christina Rosendahl; Script: Kristian Bang Foss, Christina Rosendahl, and Dunja Gry Jensen; A Perfectly Normal Family – Producers: Matilda Appelin and René Ezra; Director and Script: Malou Reymann; Riders of Justice – Producers: Sisse Graum Jørgensen and Sidsel Hybschmann; Director and Script: Anders Thomas Jensen	**Best Children's Film**: **A Perfectly Normal Family – Producers: Matilda Appelin and René Ezra; Director and Script: Malou Reymann**‡; All I Want for Christmas 2 – Producers: Morten Rasmussen and David C.H. Østerbøg; Director: Christian Dyekjær; Script: Uffe Rørbæk and Lars T. Therkildsen; Blockhagen – Producers: Daniel Mühlendorph and Ulaa Salim; Directors: Malthe Emil Kibsgaard, Sorena Sanjari, and Troels Unneland; Script: Troels Unneland and Sorena Sanjari; Dreambuilders – Producer: Nynne Selin Eidnes; Director: Kim Hagen Jensen; Script: Søren Grinderslev Hansen; Malou's Christmas – Producer: Anders W. Berthelsen; Director: Claus Bjerre; Script: Claus Bjerre and Frederik Nørgaard
**Best Director**: **Thomas Vinterberg – Another Round**‡; Anders Thomas Jensen – Riders of Justice; Jeanette Nordahl – Wildland; Malou Reymann – A Perfectly Normal Family; Christina Rosendahl – The Good Traitor	**Best Screenplay**: **Another Round – Thomas Vinterberg and Tobias Lindholm**‡; Enforcement – Anders Ølholm and Frederik Louis Hviid; A Perfectly Normal Family – Malou Reymann; Riders of Justice – Anders Thomas Jensen; Wildland – Ingeborg Topsøe
**Best Actor in a Leading Role**: **Mads Mikkelsen – Another Round as Martin**‡; Mikkel Boe Følsgaard – A Perfectly Normal Family as Thomas / Agnete; Nikolaj Lie Kaas – Riders of Justice as Otto; Jacob Ulrik Lohmann – Enforcement as Mike Andersen; Mads Mikkelsen – Riders of Justice as Markus	**Best Actress in a Leading Role**: **Andrea Heick Gadeberg – Riders of Justice as Mathilde**‡; Amanda Collin – The Exception as Malene; Danica Ćurčić – The Exception as Iben; Trine Dyrholm – Erna at War as Erna Jensen; Bodil Jørgensen – Into the Darkness as Eva Skov
**Best Actor in a Supporting Role**: **Lars Brygmann – Riders of Justice as Lennart**‡; Elliott Crosset Hove – Wildland as David; Thomas Bo Larsen – Another Round as Tommy; Magnus Millang – Another Round as Nikolaj; Lars Ranthe – Another Round as Peter	**Best Actress in a Supporting Role**: **Özlem Sağlanmak – Enforcement as Abia**‡; Maria Bonnevie – Another Round as Anika; Lene Maria Christensen – The Exception as Camilla; Sidse Babett Knudsen – The Exception as Anne-Lise; Sidse Babett Knudsen – Wildland as Bodil
**Best Production Design**: **The Good Traitor – Rie Lykke**‡; Another Round – Sabine Hviid; Enforcement – Gustav Pontoppidan; Erna at War – Jette Lehmann; A Perfectly Normal Family – Sabine Hviid and Kristina Kovacs; Riders of Justice – Nikolaj Danielsen	**Best Cinematography**: **The Good Traitor – Louise McLaughlin**‡; Another Round – Sturla Brandth Grøvlen; Enforcement – Jacob Møller; The Mole: Undercover in North Korea – Jonas Berlin; Riders of Justice – Kasper Tuxen
**Best Costume Design**: **The Good Traitor – Edit Szűcs**‡; Into the Darkness – Anne-Dorthe Eskilden; A Perfectly Normal Family – Camilla Nordbjerg; Riders of Justice – Vibe Knoblauch Hededam; Wildland – Emilie Bøge Dresler	**Best Makeup**: **A Perfectly Normal Family – Henrik Steen and Thomas Foldberg**‡; Enforcement – Henrik Steen; Erna at War – Anne Cathrine Sauerberg; The Good Traitor – Szandra Gerő; Riders of Justice – Louise Hauberg Lohmann
**Best Editing**: **Another Round – Anne Østerud and Janus Billeskov Jansen**‡; Enforcement – Anders Albjerg Kristiansen; The Good Traitor – Janus Billeskov Jansen and Olivier Bugge Coutté; A Perfectly Normal Family – Ida Bregninge; Riders of Justice – Anders Albjerg Kristiansen and Nicolaj Monberg	**Best Sound Design**: **Enforcement – Morten Green**‡; Another Round – Hans Møller and Jan Schermer; The Good Traitor – Peter Albrechtsen; I Love You I Miss You I Hope I See You Before I Die – Bo Asdal Andersen and Hans Christian Arnt Torp; Riders of Justice – Eddie Simonsen
**Best Score**: **Riders of Justice – Jeppe Kaas**‡; 7 Years of Lukas Graham – Jens Bjørnkjær; Dreambuilders – Kristian Selin Eidnes Andersen; Enforcement – Martin Dirkov; The Good Traitor – Jonas Struck	**Best Song**: **"Dage uden dig" from Dreambuilders – Music and Lyric: Alberte Winding and Kristian Selin Eidnes Andersen; Performer: Alberte Winding**‡; "Blokhavn" from Blockhagen – Music and Lyric: Kewan; Performer: Gigis; "Hver for sig" from All I Want for Christmas 2 – Music and Lyric: Rasmus Bille Bahncke, Nicklas Schmidt, and Kristian Selin Eidnes Andersen; Performer: Alma Agger; "Hvis ikke nu – så hvornår?" from The Food Club – Music and Lyric: Lis Sørensen, Elisabeth Gjerluff Nielsen, and Sylvester Sivertsen; Performer: Lis Sørensen; "Louise" from Oh, To Be a Butterfly – Music and Lyric: Jacob Groth and Søren Kragh-Jacobsen; Performer: Theis Tequila
**Best Short Fiction/Animation**: **In the Blink of an Eye – Producers: Daniel Mühlendorph and Laura Sofie Frederikke Pedersen; Director: Katrine Brocks; Script: Marianne Lentz**‡; 100,000 Acres of Pine – Producer: Michelle Ann Nardone; Director and Script: Jennifer Alice Wright; Bleed – Producer: Caroline Steenberg Dam; Director: Hannah Elbke; Script: Henrik Binger; A Calling – Producers: Trin Hjortkjær Thomsen and Laura Frederikke Kragholm; Director and Script: Christian Bengtson; Pinkie's Funeral – Producer: Theis Nørgaard; Director: Simon Mortensen; Script: Malthe Jagd Miehe-Renard and Simon Mortensen	**Best Visual Effects**: **Riders of Justice – Hummer Højmark and Peter Hjorth**‡; All I Want for Christmas 2 – Martin Madsen; Enforcement – Jan Tvilling and Jonas Drehn; Erna at War – Colin Journèe; Into the Darkness – Peter Hjorth
**Best Documentary Short**: **A Writer Named Tove – Producer: Signe Leick Jensen; Directors: Sami Saif and Peter Lopes Andersson**‡; Barnepigerne – Producer: Cæcilie Østerby Sørensen and Line Hvidtfeldt; Director: Signe Barvild Stæhr; Dengang Danmark lukkede ned – Producer: Mariella Harpelunde Jensen; Director: Emil Nørgaard Munk; It Takes a Family – Producer: Ulrik Gutkin; Director: Susanne Kovács; Livet mens vi dør – Producer: Lise Saxtrup; Director: Christine Albeck Børge	**Best Documentary Feature**: **The Mole: Undercover in North Korea – Producers: Peter Engel and Bjarte Mørner Tveit; Director: Mads Brügger**‡; 7 Years of Lukas Graham – Producer: Sara Stockmann; Director: René Sascha Johannsen; The Fight for Greenland – Producer: Ulrik Gutkin; Director: Kenneth Sorento; I Love You I Miss You I Hope I See You Before I Die – Producer: Julie Friis Walenciak; Director: Eva Marie Rødbro; Songs of Repression – Producers: Signe Byrge Sørensen and Heidi Elise Christensen; Directors: Estephan Wagner and Marianne Hougen-Moraga
**Best Non-English-language Feature**: **Portrait of a Lady on Fire in French – Directed by Céline Sciamma**‡; The Farewell in Mandarin and English – Directed by Lulu Wang; For Sama in Arabic and English – Directed by Waad Al-Kateab and Edward Watts; The Invisible Life of Eurídice Gusmão in Portuguese – Directed by Karim Aïnouz; Weathering with You in Japanese – Directed by Makoto Shinkai	**Best English-language Feature**: **1917 – Directed by Sam Mendes**‡; A Hidden Life – Directed by Terrence Malick; The Lighthouse – Directed by; Little Women – Directed by Greta Gerwig; Mank – Directed by David Fincher

==== Films with multiple nominations and awards ====
Films that received multiple nominations
Nominations	Film
15	Riders of Justice
12	Another Round
11	Enforcement
9	The Good Traitor
9	A Perfectly Normal Family
5	Wildland
4	Erna at War
4	The Exception
3	All I Want for Christmas 2
3	Dreambuilders
3	Into the Darkness
2	7 Years of Lukas Graham
2	Blockhagen
2	I Love You I Miss You I Hope I See You Before I Die
2	The Mole: Undercover in North Korea

Films that received multiple awards
Awards	Film
4	Another Round
4	Riders of Justice
3	The Good Traitor
2	Enforcement
2	A Perfectly Normal Family

=== Television ===
**Best Danish Television Series**: **Cry Wolf (DR) – Head Writer: Maja Jul Larsen; co-writer Kim Fupz Aakeson; Producer: Claudia Saginario; Concept Director: Pernille Fischer Christensen**‡; The Investigation (TV2) – Creator: Tobias Lindholm; Producers: Jonas Allen, Caroline Blanco, Peter Bose, and René Ezra; Scandinavian Star (DR) – Head Writers: Mikala Krogh, Lars Halskov, and Nikolaj Scherfig; Producers: Sigrid Dyekjær and Thomas Heinesen; Concept Director: Mikala Krogh; When the Dust Settles (Når støvet har lagt sig) (DR) – Head Writers: Dorte Warnøe Høgh and Ida Maria Rydén; Producer: Stinna Lassen; Concept Director: Milad Alami; Wild and Wonderful Denmark (DR) – Head Writer: Mark Jessen; Producer and Concept Director: Henrik Zachariassen	**Best Short Television Series**: **Julefeber (DR) – Producers: Rikke Tørholm Kofoed, Caroline Schlüter Bingestam, and Camilla Hammerich; Director: Natasha Arthy; Writer: Rune Schjøtt-Wieth**‡; 32 (Xee) – Producer: Maj-Britt Landin; Directors and Writers: Julie Rudbæk and Jesper Zuschlag; Cold Hawaii (Xee) – Producers: Julie Lind-Holm and Jacob Oliver Krarup; Directors and Writers: Aske Bang and Allan Hyde; Sex (TV2) – Producer: Marta Mleczek; Director: Amalie Næsby Fick; Writers: Clara Mendes and Amalie Næsby Fick; Something About Emma (DR) – Producer: Anders N. Berg; Director: Mads Mengel; Writer: Christian Bengtson
**Best Actor in a Leading Television Role**: **Bjarne Henriksen as Lars Madsen on Cry Wolf (DR)**‡; Jesper Groth as Bjørn Toft on The New Nurses (TV 2 Charlie); Andreas Jessen as Adam on ALFA (TV2); Søren Malling as Jens Møller on The Investigation (TV2); Lars Ranthe as Erik on Friheden (TV3)	**Best Actress in a Leading Television Role**: **Flora Ofelia Hofmann Lindahl as Holly Mølgård on Cry Wolf (DR)**‡; Asta Kamma August as Cathrine on Sex (TV2); Laura Christensen as Maibritt Porse on The Investigation (TV2); Lene Maria Christensen as Nina on Friheden (TV3); Karen-Lise Mynster as Elisabeth Hoffmann on When the Dust Settles (DR)
**Best Actor in a Supporting Television Role**: **Peter Plaugborg as Simon Hansen on Cry Wolf (DR)**‡; Pilou Asbæk as Jakob Buch-Jeps on The Investigation (TV2); Joachim Fjelstrup as Kalle on Julefeber (DR); Peter Frödin as Balletmester on Julefeber (DR); Jens Jørn Spottag as Bent Neergaard on The New Nurses (TV 2 Charlie)	**Best Actress in a Supporting Television Role**: **Christine Albeck Børge as Dea Mølgård Hansen on Cry Wolf (DR)**‡; Pernilla August as Ingrid Wall on The Investigation (TV2); Emma Sehested Høeg as Katrine on Limboland (Xee); Bodil Jørgensen as Rigmor on Julefeber (DR); Anette Støvelbæk as Ruth Madsen on The New Nurses (TV 2 Charlie)

==== Shows with multiple nominations and awards ====
Shows that received multiple nominations
Nominations	Film
5	Cry Wolf
5	The Investigation
4	Julefeber
3	The New Nurses
2	Friheden
2	Sex
2	When the Dust Settles

Shows that received multiple awards
Awards	Film
5	Cry Wolf
