= 1918 in Nordic music =

The following is a list of notable events and compositions of the year 1918 in Nordic music.

== Events ==
- February – Jean Sibelius's home in Ainola is twice searched by Finland's Red Guards. His family is subsequently escorted to Helsinki as a result of the intervention of Robert Kajanus.
- 1 May – Composer Toivo Kuula is mortally wounded by a gunshot during an incident at the Hotel Seurahuone, Viipuri, during the Finnish Civil War.
- unknown dates
  - The Swedish Society of Composers is founded, with Natanael Berg as its first president.
  - Carl Nielsen's daughter Anne Marie marries Hungarian violinist Emil Telmányi, who promotes Nielsen's music throughout the world.

== New works ==
- Leevi Madetoja – Symphony No. 2
- Carl Nielsen – Pan and Syrinx
- Jean Sibelius – Oma maa

== Popular music ==
- Felix Körling – "Ett gammalt fult och elakt troll det var en gång"

== Births ==
- 22 March – Tauno Pylkkänen, Finnish composer (died 1980)
- 3 April – Sixten Ehrling, Swedish conductor (died 2005)
- 17 May – Birgit Nilsson, Swedish operatic soprano (died 2005)
- 21 July – Vidar Sandbeck, folk singer, composer, and writer (died 2005).
- 17 September – Berit Brænne, Norwegian actress, children's writer and songwriter (died 1976).
- 26 October – Eric Ericson, Swedish choral conductor and choral teacher (died 2013)
- 16 November – Finn Ludt, pianist, composer and music critic (died 1992)
- 24 November – Torstein Grythe, Norwegian choir leader (died 2009)
- 7 December – Jórunn Viðar, Icelandic pianist and composer (died 2017)

== Deaths ==
- 1 March – Emil Sjögren, Swedish organist and composer (born 1853)
- 1 April – Karl Valentin, Swedish composer (born 1853)
- 18 May – Toivo Kuula, Finnish composer (born 1883)
- 20 May – Richard Andersson, Swedish pianist and composer (born 1851)
- 10 November – Frants Beyer, Norwegian tax inspector and composer (born 1851)
- 3 December – Anders Heyerdahl, Norwegian violinist, composer and folk music collector (born 1832)

== See also ==
- 1918 in Denmark
- 1918 in Finland
- 1918 in Iceland
- 1918 in Norwegian music
- 1918 in Sweden
