= 1889 in Nordic music =

The following is a list of notable events that occurred in the year 1889 in Nordic music.

== Events ==
- 29 May – Jean Sibelius's String Quartet in A minor is premiered at the Helsinki Music Institute.
- October – Edvard Grieg's 6 Lieder, Op. 48, are performed in Christiania by Swedish soprano Ellen Gulbranson and his 6 Digte af Holger Drachmann by Norwegian baritone Thorvald Lammers.
- 18 December – The first of Carl Nielsen's string quartets is performed privately in Copenhagen.
- unknown date
  - Wilhelm Peterson-Berger graduates from the Stockholm Conservatory and begins further studies in Dresden, Germany.
  - Agathe Backer Grøndahl gives a concert in London and is declared by music critic George Bernard Shaw to be "one of the greatest pianists in Europe".

== New works ==
- Valborg Aulin – String quartet in E minor, Op. 17
- Axel Gade – Violin concerto No. 1 in D minor
- Niels Gade – String Quartet in D major, Op. 63
- Asger Hamerik – Symphony no. 4 "Symphonie majestueuse" in C major, Op. 35
- Helena Munktell – In Florence (opera)
- Carl Nielsen
  - Fantasy Pieces for Oboe and Piano, Op. 2
  - 5 Klaverstykker, Op.3
- Jean Sibelius – String Quartet in A minor
- Christian Sinding – Piano Concerto, Op. 6
- Richard Strauss – Utan svafvel och fosfor (setting of a Swedish text)

== Popular music ==
- Carl David af Wirsén – "En vänlig grönskas rika dräkt" ("Sommarpsalm")

== Births ==
- 29 May – Aksel Agerby, Danish organist, composer and music administrator (died 1942)
- 20 November – Karl Rautio, Finnish composer (died 1963)

== Deaths ==
- 10 January – Martin Andreas Udbye, Norwegian organist and composer and organist (born 1820)
- 13 March – Nicolai Berendt, Danish pianist and composer (born 1826)
- 21 March – Fanny Stål, Swedish pianist (born 1820)
- 24 April – Mathilda Gelhaar, Swedish opera singer and official court singer (born 1814)
- 14 July – Elma Ström, Swedish opera singer (born 1822)
- 8 August – Anna Maria Klemming, Swedish operatic soprano (born 1864; "exhaustion")

== See also ==
- 1880s in Danish music
- 1889 in Norwegian music
- 1889 in Sweden
