= Albert Rudbeck Lindhardt =

Danish actor (born 2001)

- Born: 2001 (age 24–25); Skodsborg, Rudersdal, Denmark
- Occupation: Actor
- Years active: 2011–present

Albert Rudbeck Lindhardt (born 2001) is a Danish actor.

== Biography ==
Albert Rudbeck Lindhardt was born in Skodsborg in 2001.

He attended Nærum Gymnasium, but dropped out to pursue acting professionally. His older brother, William Rudbeck Lindhardt, is also an actor.

== Filmography ==
=== Film ===
Year	Title	Role	Notes	Ref.
2016	The Day Will Come	Erik		
2016	Finding Santa	Gregers	Voice role	
2017	Next Door Spy	Vincent's brother	Voice role	
2018	Land of Glass	Jas		
2019	Collision	Gustav		
2020	Another Round	Sebastian		
2020	Riders of Justice	Sirius		
2021	As in Heaven	Jens Peter		
2022	Pretty Young Thing	Mathias		
2024	Way Home	Adam		

=== Television ===
Year	Title	Role	Notes	Ref.
2016	The Other World	Albert	24 episodes	
2018	Finding Home	Hans	4 episodes	
2019	Follow the Money	Carl	6 episodes	
2020	Pulse	Bastian	18 episodes	
2022	Chosen	Mads	6 episodes	
2024	Families like Ours	Elias	7 episodes	
