= 1942 in Nordic music =

The following is a list of notable events and compositions of the year 1942 in Nordic music.

== Events ==
- 26 October – Violinist Jacob Scharff is detained at Bredtveit prison along with his father and brother; they are later sent to Camp Berg outside Tønsberg.

== New works ==
- Selim Palmgren
  - Sun & Clouds, 12 Pieces for Piano, Op. 102
  - Jouluaatto ("Christmas Morning") for Chorus and Orchestra, Op. 103a
- Ture Rangstrom – Hanneles himmelsfärd

== Popular music ==
- Matti Jurva & Tatu Pekkarinen – "Njet Molotoff"
- Jacob Scharff & Arne Paasche Aasen – "Skjønne Sorina"

== Film music ==
- Erik Baumann – Fallet Ingegerd Bremssen
- Lars-Erik Larsson – Farliga vägar

== Births ==
- 15 June – Birgitte Alsted, Danish violinist, teacher and composer
- 17 June – Torgrim Sollid, Norwegian folk and jazz musician
- 21 June – Ditlef Eckhoff, Norwegian jazz trumpeter
- 25 August – Terje Fjærn, Norwegian musician, orchestra leader and musical conductor (died 2016)

== Deaths ==
- 8 January – Catharinus Elling, Norwegian organist, composer and ethnomusicologist (born 1858)
- 20 March – Aksel Agerby, Danish organist, composer and music administrator (born 1889)
- 14 April – Ida Ekman, Finnish soprano (born 1875)
- 23 May – Harald Lie, Norwegian composer (born 1902)
- 1 June – Ernest Pingoud, Finnish composer (born 1887; suicide)
- 20 November – Emma Meissner, Swedish operatic soprano and actress (born 1866)
- 2 December – Karen Jønsson née (Pedersen), Danish jazz singer, pianist, songwriter, composer, and actress (born 1909)
- 3 December – Wilhelm Peterson-Berger, composer (born 1867)
- December – Jacob Scharff, Latvian-born Norwegian violinist and composerr (born 1908)

== See also ==
- 1942 in Denmark
- 1942 in Iceland
- 1942 in Norwegian music
- 1942 in Sweden
