= 1883 in Nordic music =

The following is a list of notable events that occurred in the year 1883 in Nordic music.

== Events ==
- unknown date
  - Danish composer Johan Svendsen is appointed principal conductor of Copenhagen's Royal Theatre Orchestra, despite his lack of experience in the role.
  - Swedish soprano Jenny Lind sings in public for the last time, aged 63.
  - Swedish violinist Tor Aulin graduates from the Royal College of Music, Stockholm.
  - Danish composer Carl Nielsen, aged 18, visits Copenhagen where he is introduced to Niels Gade. Gade suggests he enrol at the Royal Danish Academy of Music.
  - Norwegian composer and teacher Edmund Neupert relocates permanently to the United States.

== New works ==
- Edvard Grieg
  - Sonata for cello and piano
  - Sangerhilsen
  - Valse-kapriser
- Ludvig Norman – String Quartet no 5 (revised)
- Wilhelm Stenhammar – Sonata in A Flat Major

== Births ==
- 11 February – Paul von Klenau, Danish conductor and composer (died 1946)
- 7 July – Toivo Kuula, Finnish composer (died 1918)
- 17 August – Alfred Evensen, Norwegian musician and composer (died 1942)
- 19 August – Emilius Bangert, Danish organist and composer (died 1962)

== Deaths ==
- 6 June – Per Lasson, composer (born 1859)
- 14 July – Svend Grundtvig, Danish collector of traditional music (born 1824)

== See also ==
- 1883 in Denmark
- 1883 in Norwegian music
- 1883 in Sweden
