= 2005 in Nordic music =

The following is a list of notable events and releases that happened in Nordic music in 2005.

== Events ==
- 15 January – The new Copenhagen Opera House, designed by Henning Larsen, opens on the island of Holmen. Queen Margrethe II of Denmark and Denmark's prime minister Anders Fogh are among those present at the ceremony.
- 18 March – On the first day of Norway's Vossajazz festival, Berit Opheim is awarded the Vossajazzprisen 2005.
- 15 April – Einojuhani Rautavaara's Book of Visions is premièred at the Palais des Beaux-Arts in Brussels.
- 20 April – The world premiere of Barlinnie Nine by Osmo Tapio Räihälä at the Finlandia Hall on the same day, as its subject Duncan Ferguson re-emerged as a striking force in the English Premier League.
- 20 May – Jorun Stiansen becomes the first woman to win Norway's version of Idol, when she is victorious in the final of the third series.
- 21 May – At the final of the 50th Eurovision Song Contest in Ukraine, Denmark, represented by Jakob Sveistrup, and Norway, represented by Wig Wam, finish in joint 9th place, the highest of any of the Scandinavian countries.
- 11 October – Einojuhani Rautavaara's Manhattan Trilogy for strings is premièred at Carnegie Hall, New York City.
- December – Guitarist Peter Wichers leaves the Swedish band Soilwork to concentrate on producing.
- unknown date – Rune Eriksen co-founds the doom metal band Ava Inferi.

== Classical works ==
- Kalevi Aho – Clarinet Concerto
- Magnus Lindberg – Sculpture
- Esa-Pekka Salonen – Helix for orchestra

== Popular music ==
- Dolph – "Arghhh!!!" (#2 Denmark)
- Trine Dyrholm – "Mr. Nice Guy"
- Giv Til Asien – "Hvor små vi er" (#1 Denmark)
- Klara Hammarström – "On and on and On" (#1 Sweden)
- Kent – "Den döda vinkeln" (#14 Sweden)
- Daniel Lindström – "Coming True" (#1 Sweden)
- Nephew – "Mr. Nice Guy" (#1 Denmark)
- Sigur Rós – "Hoppípolla" (UK #24)
- Martin Stenmarck – "Las Vegas" (#1 Sweden)
- Wig Wam – "In My Dreams" (#1 Norway)

== Eurovision Song Contest ==
- Denmark in the Eurovision Song Contest 2005
- Finland in the Eurovision Song Contest 2005
- Iceland in the Eurovision Song Contest 2005
- Norway in the Eurovision Song Contest 2005
- Sweden in the Eurovision Song Contest 2005

== Births ==
- 17 July – Theoz, Swedish singer

== Deaths ==
- 1 January – Magnús Blöndal Jóhannsson, Icelandic pianist, conductor and composer (born 1925)
- 7 January – Ivar Medaas, Norwegian folk singer (born 1938)
- 13 February – Sixten Ehrling, Swedish conductor (born 1918)
- 19 April – Niels-Henning Ørsted Pedersen, Danish jazz bassist (born 1946); heart attack).
- 25 May – Jurij Moskvitin, Danish pianist and composer (born 1938)
- 29 June – Mikkel Flagstad, Norwegian saxophonist (born 1930)
- 21 July – Tamara Lund, Finnish singer and actress (born 1941; stomach cancer)
- 17 August – Lars Kristian Brynildsen, Norwegian clarinetist, Bergen Philharmonic Orchestra (born 1954)
- 11 September – Carin Malmlöf-Forssling, Swedish organist and composer (born 1916)
- 10 November – Vidar Sandbeck, Norwegian folk singer and composer (born 1918)
- 25 December – Birgit Nilsson, Swedish operatic soprano (born 1918)
