= As in Heaven =

As in Heaven may refer to:

- As in Heaven (1992 film), Icelandic film
- As in Heaven (2021 film), Danish film
