= Anders Lund Madsen =

Danish journalist and entertainer (born 1963)

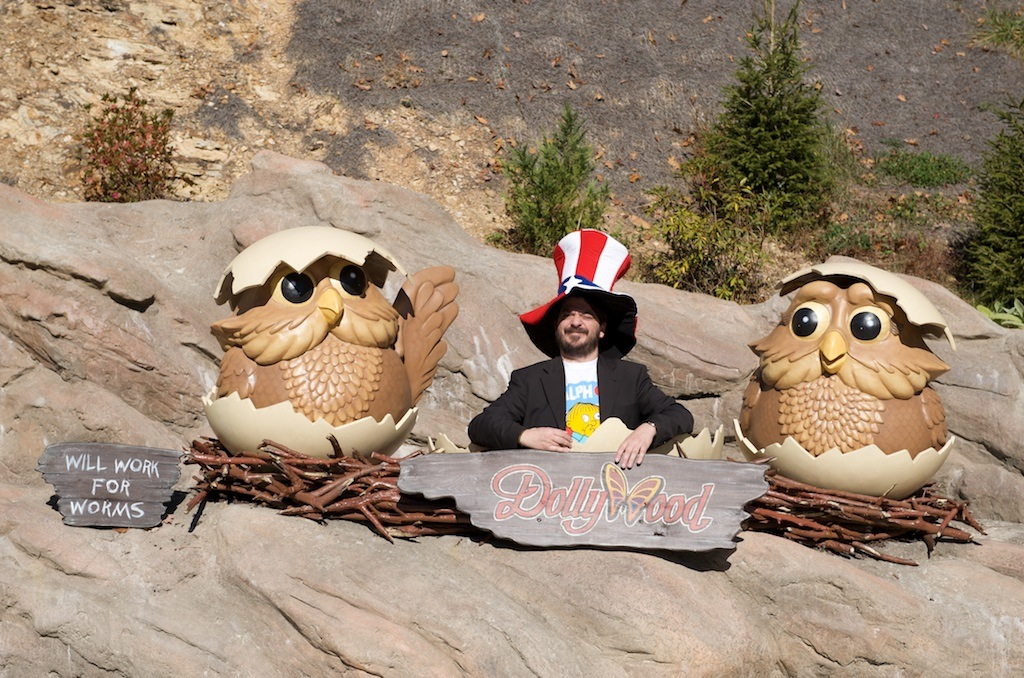
- Anders Lund Madsen in Dollywood, United States.
- Born: 15 October 1963 (age 62); Sorgenfri, Denmark
- Website: anderslundmadsen.dk

Anders Lund Madsen (born 15 October 1963) is a Danish journalist, comedian, author, radio personality and talkshow host. He hosts the talkshow "Det Nye Talkshow – med Anders Lund Madsen". Together with his brother Peter Lund Madsen, he has performed several shows at the Bellevue Theater and in Bremen Theater. Together they wrote the lyrics of the song "Avenuen", which was part of one of their shows performed by Trine Dyrholm. They have also participated in the quiz program Who Wants to Be a Millionaire? where they have twice won the main prize of 1 million kroner.

Anders Lund Madsen has had his own radio programme Fedeabes Fyraften on Danish radio-station Radio24syv since 3 April 2017.

== Career ==
=== Early years ===
He has been a regular writer on several newspapers, including Ekstra Bladet, where he wrote the back cover Madsen & Madsen along with Povl Høst-Madsen. In 2007–2010 he wrote every Sunday for Morgenavisen Jyllands-Posten. Madsen has also written articles and chords for Euroman, Ekstra Bladet and Berlingske. He founded Zirkus Nemo together with the circus director and actor Søren Østergaard. He participated in the circus tours 1999, 2000 and 2003.

He has participated in a wide range of radio and television shows, including Natmadsen, Taxa-Madsen, Mens vi venter på Kometen and Up in the head, Bad news, Next week's TV. In December 2015, Madsen made the widely acclaimed program from Greenland, The Outer City.

As a journalist, he has been a reporter for TV2 at the Olympics in 1996 and 2000. He has made many alternative interviews with stars such as Björk, Leonard Cohen, Crown Prince Frederik, Queen Margrethe II and Madonna. He has made several children's television programs, often with Signe Lindkvist.

Together with his brother, neuroscientist Peter Lund Madsen, he has won one million kroner in the TV quiz Who wants to be a millionaire? in 2002. The amount was donated to the Danish Church Humaritarian Aid. In 2013, they participated again in the program this time with Hans Pilgaard as host, where they also won a million.

He was, along with Anders Breinholt, radio host on the radio program De Sorte Spejdere (English: "The Black Scouts") on P3 from 2005 to 2008, which had over one million listeners, and was the most downloaded podcast throughout the period. In 2019 he announced a podcast with Lars Løkke Rasmussen.

=== Entertainment shows ===
Together with his brother, Peter Lund Madsen, he wrote and participated in the theatre performance Mr. Nice Guy (2004–2005) at the Bellevue Theater, which was seen by more than 60,000 people. The Lund Madsen brother wrote the text of the three songs "Quiet in the World", "Little Mirror" and "Avenu ", while Kim Larsen wrote the melodies. The songs were performed by Trine Dyrholm during the show and they were all released on her EP Mr. Nice Guy. The song "Avenues" became a huge hit and was # 1 on the single hit list for a total of 135 weeks.

Together with his former black-scouts-co-host, Anders Breinholt, Anders Lund Madsen released the podcast Anders & Anders in 2016.

=== The New Talkshow ===
On 18 September 2009 Anders Lund Madsen's live talk show The New Talkshow – with Anders Lund Madsen premiered on the main Danish TV-channel DR1. The talk show was sent last November 2011. Anders Lund Madsen and two other DR employees received fines of DKK 10–12,000 after Signe Molde made a feature of the program in which she went to the police station with a bag of weapons, including a hand ax, a pepper spray and three knives. The police, therefore, believed that, together with Molde and the editor-in-chief, Madsen could be held responsible for the feature.

== Private life ==
Madsen was married to Helle Lund Madsen, with whom he has three children, Sofie My, Bjórk and Storm. The couple was divorced in 2008.

In September 2011, Madsen was engaged with Karin Prehst Utoft, with whom he has fathered three children: Modig, Stærkodder and Fri

== Bibliography ==
- Som mænd vil ha' det with Birgit Johansen, Ekstra Bladets Forlag, 1989, ISBN 8777310314.
- Madsens ÆØÅ, ordbog over ting, som der sjovt nok endnu ikke findes ord for, Aschehougs Forlag, 1997, ISBN 8711111895.
- Hold masken eller der falder brænde ned with journalist Michael Jeppesen, Politikens Forlag, 2006, ISBN 9788756779692.
- Blod, tis & tårer, historier om kroppen (children's book) with Signe Lindkvist & Troels Carlsen, Politikens Forlag, 2006, ISBN 9788756780933.
- Bank på!, en skinhellig klummeklovn hykler igennem (collection of his columns from the Danish newspaper Jyllands-Posten), Jyllands-Postens Forlag, 2010, ISBN 9788776921781.
- Mælkebøtteruten, på tur gennem det glemte Danmark, det endnu ikke opdagede Danmark – og det Danmark, der hele tiden er lige foran vores øjne , with Karsten Andersen (photographer) and Ole Sønnichsen (editor), Jyllands-Postens Forlag, 2010, ISBN 9788776922412.
