= Tomtegubben som hade snuva =

Song
- Language: Swedish
- Published: 1915
- Genre: children, Christmas
- Songwriter: Felix Körling
- Composer: Felix Körling

"Tomtegubben som hade snuva", also known as "En liten tomtegubbe satt en gång", is a Swedish children's song from 1915, written by Felix Körling. The song depicts a little tomte suffering from rhinitis, but becoming healthy again after, advised by his wife, getting medicine by "Doktor Mullvad"/"(Doctor Mole)".

The song is often used as a Christmas song, even if the word Christmas isn't mentioned, and it's not made clear whether the main character is Santa Claus (Swedish: jultomten) (or one of his elves) or the old traditional "tomte".

== Publication ==
- Lek med toner, 1971
- Barnvisboken, 1977, as "En liten tomtegubbe" ("Tomtegubben som hade snuva")
- Julens önskesångbok, 1997, under the heading "Nyare julsånger"

== Recordings ==
An early recording was done by four-year-old girl Lisbeth Bodin with Cupolorkestern on 28 October 1949, and was released as a single in January 1950.
