= Torkel Korling =

Swedish-born American photographer

Torkel Korling (April 24, 1903 – October 22, 1998) was a Swedish-born American industrial, commercial, portrait and botanical photographer.

== Early life ==
Torkel Korling was born into a 400-year line of Lutheran Church choir directors and organists in Kristdala, Sweden. His father, Felix Körling, was first to find success beyond the church as a composer and conductor in Sweden. Korling set out to be a botanist. Torkel's surname in its usage in the USA is normally spelled without the umlaut.

== Migration to America ==
Korling migrated to Chicago at age nineteen to study North American flora and fauna and photograph it on his folding Kodak Brownie camera. He worked in the wheat fields and then in a Chicago foundry before becoming interested in camera mechanisms. From his interests arose three strands in Korling’s subsequent career; as an inventor, commercial photographer, and as a naturalist.

== Inventor ==
Having devised an apple-picking device in his youth, in 1933 Korling invented and patented for Graflex camera corporation an automatic aperture control that enabled full-aperture viewing for accurate focus, closing to the pre-selected aperture opening when the shutter was fired and simultaneously synchronising the firing of a flash unit. It was the forerunner of a feature adopted on 35mm single-lens reflex cameras from the late fifties. He also patented portable, collapsible tripods with extendable leg braces for stability which he updated in 1943.

Even at seventy-nine years old, Korling developed, as an improvement on the conventional pan head tripod camera mount, a gimbal triaxial universal camera mount permitting the pivoting of the camera about three axes: a vertical axis, a horizontal axis, and a central lens axis; his 'Optipivot' allows the photographer to focus on a scene and then move the camera in any direction and still stay in focus with relation to the subject.

== Photographer ==
A logging company in Wisconsin hired Korling to take pictures of landholdings it planned to sell. A Chicago magazine editor hired him in 1926 to take pictures of the city and Korling moved there. A friend encouraged Korling to show his pictures to a Chicago ad agency art director, and his career as a commercial photographer was launched. From the 1920s through the 1950s Korling was extensively published in Fortune and Life magazines and did annual reports for major companies; Container Corporation of America, Dow Chemical, and Standard Oil of California. His shot of business executives meeting in a boardroom of modern design was chosen by Edward Steichen for the world-touring Museum of Modern Art exhibition The Family of Man which was seen by 9 million visitors. From the late 1940s to 1962 he was granted access to RR Donnelley's Chicago and Crawfordsville facilities, producing more than 300 images for them at a time when the company carefully guarded its innovations. He was favoured for his ability in staging and capturing the essential steps in manufacturing processes, often in the one image, since he rarely made more than one shot at each location. At the same time as being documentary, Korling's Donnelly images are modernist in their composition, treatment of surface, and lighting. In making his architectural photographs Korling never cropped his pictures and relied on available light whenever possible.

Korling’s portrayal of children, in their own homes rather than in the studio, with his Graflex fitted with his automatic diaphragm and multiple flash units for lighting were noted in a number of articles as ‘natural’ and unselfconscious and were promoted by the Graflex company in their advertising. His photograph of his son Peter’s hand in his was seen widely as used in an insurance promotions that won the 1937 National Advertising Award.

== Naturalist ==
After becoming an important commercial and industrial photographer Korling went back to the subject of plant life for his third career his in old age. He lived long enough to reconcile his two passions, photographing indigenous plant life across the Midwest and around the country while on corporate assignments. He published several books of his nature work that sold more than 100,000 copies over the last four decades.

In his book The boreal forest and borders, from nature he remembers as a boy bicycling to the edges of his town on the West coast of Sweden and rediscovering same forest's edge in North America where, he writes, “Natural vegetation everywhere has done considerable retreating in our lifetimes. This book, as will each one in the series, Wild Plants In Flower, aims to provoke an appreciation for what remains, whether you can recollect what once was or not.” In Chicago on 20 acres near Dundee, he designed an arboretum frequently used for his nature studies. He became well known in Evanston during his last two decades.

Korling died at Lakeshore Health Care and Rehabilitation Center in Chicago after a severe stroke in the prior July, and was survived by his former wife, Diane Fawcett Korling; a son, Peter Felix Korling; and two daughters, Jenny Korling Nowlen and Annika Korling. He was remembered at a gathering at Bookman's Alley in Evanston which stocked his books.

== Publications ==
- Korling, Torkel; Petty, Robert O (1977), Eastern deciduous forest (Rev. ed. of Deciduous forest ed.), [publisher not identified]
- Korling, Torkel; Petty, Anne M (2005), Wetlands and quiet waters of the Midwest, Quarry Books, ISBN 978-0-253-21766-0
- Korling, Torkel; Betz, Robert F (1972), The prairie: swell and swale, from nature, Dundee, Ill
- Korling, Torkel; Voss, Edward G. (Edward Groesbeck), 1929- (1973), The boreal forest and borders, from nature, Dundee, Ill
- Buck, Glen; Kent, Rockwell, 1882-1971, (illus.) (1934), Fifty years, 1884-1934 : A.B. Dick company, Priv. print. [The Lakeside press

== Group exhibitions ==
- The Art of Commerce: Photographs by Torkel Korling and other Midwestern Photographers for Industry and Advertising, Kelmscott Gallery, Chicago Feb. 8–March 12, 1994
- A World of Strangers, Huntington Library, San Marino, California 17 October 17–April 4, 2016.
