= Dreambuilders =

Danish animated fantasy film

- Film poster
- Directed by: Kim Hagen Jensen
- Screenplay by: Søren Grinderslev Hansen
- Based on: an original idea by Kim Hagen Jensen
- Produced by: Sunit Parekh; Nynne Selin Eidnes
- Starring: Robyn Dempsey; Emma Jenkins; Luke Griffin; Tom Hale; Karen Ardiff; Brendan McDonald; Alberte Winding; Stephanie Vazquez; Paul Tylak
- Edited by: Rikke Selin Fokdal
- Music by: Kristian Eidnes Andersen
- Production companies: Splendid Animation; Creative Europe MEDIA; SF Studios; First Lady Film
- Release date: 6 February 2020
- Running time: 81 minutes
- Country: Denmark
- Language: Danish
- Box office: $4 million

Dreambuilders (Danish: Drømmebyggerne) is a 2020 Danish animated fantasy comedy-drama film directed by Kim Hagen Jensen, from a screenplay by Søren Grinderslev Hansen.

== Plot ==
Minna is a young girl who lives out in the rural country with her father, John; her mother Karen left them to pursue her career as a singer. Minna struggles to adjust to the arrival of John's new wife, Helene, and her daughter Jenny, who regularly quarrels with Minna. While dreaming one night, Minna discovers a hole in the sky and notices blue creatures controlling her dream, who abruptly wake her up. Minna investigates the following night, discovering the blue creatures are Dreambuilders, responsible for designing peoples' dreams, and meets Gaff, her Dreambuilder. While hiding from the Inspector, Minna is knocked off her dream stage and into her father's, inadvertently altering his dream when she hands him a can of anchovies instead of the cake as was scripted.

Waking up, Minna discovers that, due to tampering with his dream, John now loves anchovies, and realizes she can influence people through their dreams. When Jenny threatens to have Minna's hamster, Viggo, taken to an animal shelter, Minna appeals to Gaff to help change Jenny's mind. Gaff reluctantly agrees and the pair interfere with Jenny's dream to include a mechanical, giant-sized Viggo. While in the dream world, Minna learns that if a dreamer is out of their dream stage for too long, they cease to exist. Upon waking up, Minna finds that Jenny has now taken a liking to Viggo, but is distraught to learn that Jenny has been mocking Minna's fashion sense to her Instagram followers. Resolving to fix Jenny, Minna again interferes with Jenny's dream, attempting to get her to like Minna's sweater. She's nearly caught by the Inspector, but manages to escape with the help of Milo, a former Dreambuilder who was demoted to janitor after inadvertently destroying a dream stage by altering the script.

Jenny panics upon learning she's wearing Minna's sweater and is wrought with anxiety at her bizarre changes in behavior, causing Helene to decide to move them back to the city. While packing, Jenny discovers Minna's journal containing images of her dream. Realizing Minna is somehow tampering with her dreams, Jenny threatens retaliation and gets Helene to reconsider moving. Jenny deliberately invokes jealousy from Minna by bonding with John, causing Minna to lash out at her family. Furious, Minna constructs a nightmare for Jenny, taking advantage of her arachnophobia by terrorizing her with spiders, including a mechanical, giant-sized one. However, the dream stage collapses, and Jenny plunges into the Dream Trash, where used sets are discarded, much to Minna's horror. The Inspector blames Gaff for the travesty and demotes him to janitor. In the real world, Jenny is placed in a coma. Remorseful, Minna reconciles with John and resolves to save Jenny.

In her dream, Minna meets her mother, who attempts to get her to stay in bed, but sees through the charade and discovers her to be an actor. With help from Gaff, Minna evades the Inspector and enters the Dream Trash, recovering Jenny. However, the tower leading out of the Dream Trash is destroyed, stranding them there. While fleeing from the out-of-control mechanical spider, Minna and Jenny hide in the ruined set of one of Jenny's former dreams, where Minna learns that Jenny's father left her and Helene years ago, blaming Jenny for the move. The two reconcile and find an old dream controller, using it to levitate several large objects to act as a ladder to one of the dream stages. They're pursued by the spider, but with help from Gaff, Minna manages to deactivate it. Jenny begins to fade to being away from her dream stage for too long, but Minna, Gaff and the Inspector manage to return her to her stage and wake her up in time. In the real world, Jenny awakens from her coma, to Minna's delight.

Minna, Jenny, John and Helene manage to come together as a family. In the dream world, Gaff, reinstated as a Dreambuilder, begins construction on a new dream.

== Voice cast ==
- Emilie Koppel as Minna
- Caroline Vedel Larsen as Jenny
- Rasmus Botoft as John / Gnaven dream builder / Milo
- Martin Buch as Gaff
- Ditte Hansen as Helene
- Mia Lerdam as Clothing Salesman / Social Media Girls
- Stig Hoffmeyer as Inspector
- Alberte Winding as Karen Mitchels
- Kim Hagen Jensen as Jenny's father
- Morten Kamuk Andersen as Dream Builder # 2 / Actor # 1–3

== Release ==
The film was released in theatres in Denmark on 6 February 2020 by First Lady Film, where it received 69,991 admissions in Danish cinemas.

=== Box office ===
The film gross grossed $4 million worldwide. The top grossing countries were Australia ($689K), Germany ($631K) and the United Kingdom ($590K).

=== Home media ===
The film was released straight-to-video in the United States from Shout! Factory on 10 August 2021 as a DVD/Blu-ray and a stand-alone DVD on 24 August 2021.

=== Critical response ===
While it was acclaimed in Scandinavia, The film received mixed reviews from international critics. On review aggregator Rotten Tomatoes, the film has an approval rating of 58% based on 12 reviews.
