= Chosen (Danish TV series) =

- Promotional poster
- Genre: Coming-of-age; Science fiction
- Created by: Jannik Tai Mosholt; Kaspar Munk; Christian Potalivo
- Starring: Malaika Mosendane; Andrea Heick Gadeberg; Andreas Dittmer
- Country of origin: Denmark
- Original language: Danish
- No. of seasons: 1
- No. of episodes: 6

Production
- Running time: 41–49 minutes
- Production companies: Tall and Small

Original release
- Network: Netflix
- Release: 27 January 2022

Chosen is a Danish streaming television series created by Jannik Tai Mosholt, Kaspar Munk and Christian Potalivo and starring Malaika Berenth Mosendane, Andrea Heick Gadeberg and Andreas Dittmer. It premiered on Netflix on January 27, 2022.

== Cast ==
- Malaika Berenth Mosendane as Emma
- Andrea Heick Gadeberg as Marie
- Andreas Dittmer as Frederik
- Albert Rudbeck Lindhardt as Mads
- Mohamed Djeziri as Elvis
- Anders Heinrichsen as Lukas
- Magnus Juhl Andersen as Jonas
- Line Kruse as Lykke
- Marie Louise Wille as Susan
- Rikke Eberhardt Isen as Leyla
- Henrik Prip as Hans
- Nicolaj Kopernikus as Adrian
- Ken Vedsegaard as Thomas
- Eva Jin as Zannie
- Victor Pøhl as Nikolaj
- Jonas Munck Hansen as John Dinckler
- Sarah Rose Clear as Noreen
- Joen Højerslev as Svend

== Episodes ==
| No. | Title | Directed by | Written by | Original release date |
|---|---|---|---|---|
| 1 | "The Fact That Meteors Are Made of Glass Is Pretty Crazy!" | Kaspar Munk | Jannik Tai Mosholt, Kaspar Munk, Christian Potalivo, Ida Maria Rydén | 27 January 2022 |
In an economically depressed Danish town that was struck by a meteorite 17 years ago (Middelbo), Emma, a troubled 17 year old girl, works at the meteorite tourist attraction. She meets a group of youth led by Mads, who are investigating strange happenings in the town, and who suspect that the meteorite was actually a spaceship, and the beings on it, somehow linked to those humans who were living within a small radius of the strike, have hostile intent. Suspicion falls on her science teacher, Hans.
| 2 | "Just Think of Queen Margrethe" | Kaspar Munk | Jannik Tai Mosholt, Kaspar Munk, Christian Potalivo, Ida Maria Rydén | 27 January 2022 |
Pushed by Mads's group, Emma goes twice to Hans's house, the second time uninvited, and finds strange alien plant life. Hans is attacked by a masked man with incredible speed while she is there, and dies. Traumatised, she and Marie spend the night, and she later reports back to the group, who do not believe her.
| 3 | "Have You Heard?" | Kaspar Munk | Jannik Tai Mosholt, Kaspar Munk, Christian Potalivo, Ida Maria Rydén, Julie Budtz Sørensen | 27 January 2022 |
Returning to Hans's house with police, all signs of suspicious goings-on have been removed. Hans had implanted a small marble-like object in Emma's neck before he died, and she discovers it. It glows. Suspicion grows that a new marine venture (Astraeus) in town led by a suspicious character, Thomas, is actually a cover for alien activity.
| 4 | "Call Mads" | Kaspar Munk | Stefan Jaworski, Jannik Tai Mosholt, Kaspar Munk, Christian Potalivo, Ida Maria Rydén | 27 January 2022 |
Emma is confused, and in addition to her fling with Marie, now has sex with Frederik, another member of the group, while they are investigating a motel. Suspicious activities continue in Middelbo. It is unclear who the good guys are: a group clearly linked to the spaceship landing, or a lone man, Lukas, who reveals to Emma that he is from a world colonised and overtaken by the former group and has taken human form. He explains that they will essentially take over Earth. Emma begins to side with him, especially after discovering a huge pulsing organism and hostile people/beings at an abandoned sawmill. She steals Mads's hard drive, with the fruits of his entire investigation, leaving Mads without direction.
| 5 | "You Hold It With Your Fingers. You Eat It With Your Mouth" | Kaspar Munk | Jannik Tai Mosholt, Kaspar Munk, Christian Potalivo, Ida Maria Rydén | 27 January 2022 |
The title refers to Emma teaching Lukas how to eat battered fish in a cafe. But he exits the cafe on seeing a suspicious character who is an alien, fights outside, just survives, and is cared for by Emma. Mads wheels into the Astraeus factory and is shown by its leader, Thomas, their secret operations. Thomas wants all of Mads's knowledge: but the hard drive with his investigations is with Emma, who leaves it in her bag where Marie eventually accesses it. Meanwhile, Emma breaks into her psychologist's office, since she is also a suspect, and Emma and Lukas trail her. The psychologist encounters Emma's motherLykke, leading Emma to wonder if her mum is one of the aliens. Marie throws the hard drive in the sea (without explanation).
| 6 | "You Still Want Everything to Be About You" | Kaspar Munk | Jannik Tai Mosholt, Kaspar Munk, Christian Potalivo, Ida Maria Rydén | 27 January 2022 |
Emma confronts her mother Lykke about her identity, guessing correctly that she is not her true, biological mother. The Astraeus people are tipped off by Mads where Lukas is living in an abandoned building, and arrive there in force, capturing Emma briefly. Lukas, with his lightening speed, kills almost all of the aliens, with bodies thrown from higher storeys where we also hear gunfire and screams. He and Emma drive off in one of their cars, and Lukas finally explains the alien's purpose to her. They become familiar with every aspect of a person's life before they are able to take over and assume their identity. This has affected a large proportion of Middelbo already, but will eventually 'spread' and wipe out humanity, he argues. Lukas wants to stop the aliens, and convinces Emma they need to visit her mother Lykke, who will be a link to lead them to others. Emma is emotional but arranges a meeting at Mother Thai restaurant. A male alien shows up instead. He says he was present when she was born, right at the time of the spaceship landing in Middelbo. He says his people are colonisers/aggressors but fled war on their planet - he transports her into different places and times, seeing her own birth -her mother was a Black woman in Middelbo who then died in childbirth - aided by Hans who made sure Lykke adopted and raised her. The alien explains Emma is special, with alien qualities and non-human sensitivities and should join with them tomorrow to leave the Earth and return to their planet, possibly now free of war. This is proven by discovering she has milky-coloured blood, something that had been masked all her life by medication. The alien transports her to another time and place to explain how Astraeus was simply trying to build a spaceship to take them all home. Emma is confused by all the new information about the rights and wrongs of the two competing alien narratives she has been given, and reveals, by accident, Lukas's mission (to wipe them out). Returning home, very confused about her identity, she sees Marie who warns here Mads and the Astraeus aliens are seeking her, possibly because they are still not sure if she is friend or foe. She finds her adopted mother dead, killed by Lukas, who is still in the house. They struggle, and the Astraeus crew arrive seeking Lukas. Emma flees through the night to a barrier island where the spherical Astraeus spaceship is ready to take off at dawn, and she is welcomed. But the ship shatters and explodes, and Lukas emerges, killing the aliens surrounding it. One says "there are others, find them" to Emma, and she runs away, possibly the only survivor. We are left unsure whether Lukas will pursue her.
