= Someone You Love =

- Film poster
- Danish: En du elsker
- Directed by: Pernille Fischer Christensen
- Starring: Mikael Persbrandt; Trine Dyrholm
- Release date: 11 February 2014 (Berlinale)
- Running time: 95 minutes
- Country: Denmark
- Languages: Swedish; English; Danish

Someone You Love (Danish: En du elsker) is a 2014 Danish drama film directed by Pernille Fischer Christensen.

== Cast ==
- Mikael Persbrandt - Thomas Jacob
- Trine Dyrholm - Molly Moe
- Birgitte Hjort Sørensen - Julie
- Sofus Rønnov - Noa
- Eve Best - Kate
- Lourdes Faberes - Pepita Ponce
