= Birthday Girl (2023 film) =

2023 Danish film

- Directed by: Michael Noer
- Screenplay by: Michael Noer; Jesper Fink
- Starring: Trine Dyrholm; Flora Ofelia Hofmann Lindahl
- Release date: 2023
- Running time: 95 minutes
- Country: Denmark
- Languages: Danish; English

Birthday Girl is a 2023 Danish thriller film directed by Michael Noer. The film follows a mother (Trine Dyrholm) and daughter (Flora Ofelia Hofmann Lindahl) who grapple with the aftermath of a sexual assault while on a cruise ship.

== Synopsis ==
Birthday Girl is a psychological thriller/drama that takes place over 3 days on a cruise ship bound for the Caribbean. 42-year-old Nanna takes her daughter Cille and Cille's best friend on the cruise to celebrate her daughter's 18th birthday. On the first night, Nanna and Cille get into a fight and Nanna goes off on her own, leaving the girls at the ship's nightclub. Early in the morning, Nanna is woken by the ship's crew who inform her that her daughter has been found sleeping on the deck of the ship. Cille informs her mother that she has no memory of the night before but that she believes she has been sexually assaulted.

However, Cille refuses to be examined so that no evidence of rape can be secured. Nanna starts to investigate on her own and finds Cille's necklace within a chair on the upper deck. Cille's best friend shows pictures of Cille kissing a young man called Kevin. Cille tells Nanna that she bit her rapist. Nanna finds Kevin and forces him to undress his shirt but no bite marks are visible.

At the next day, Nanna and Cille follow Kevin's brother Mats into his cabin when leaving from a party. Within the cabin, Mats uncovers his bite marks and he confesses to be the rapist. Nanna films this confession but Mats wants to take her phone. After a wrangling about the phone they end up on the cabin's balcony.

The next scene shows Nanna and Cille leaving the room and discussing whether they should call for help. It becomes clear that Cille has pushed Mats off the balcony. The film ends with Nanna, Cille and her friend disembarking in Miami and Kevin desperately searching for his brother, blaming Nanna for his absence but being arrested by the police.

== Cast ==
- Trine Dyrholm as Nanna
- Flora Ofelia Hofmann Lindahl as Cille
- Herman Tømmeraas as Kevin
- Maja Ida Thiele as Lea
- Viktor Bjerke Hofgaard as Mats

== Production ==
Dyrholm and Ofelia being interviewed by Nordisk Film TV about "Birthday Girl"

The script for Birthday Girl was written by Jesper Fink and Michael Noer, with the latter directing the film. Noer was inspired by an article he read about the number of cases of sexual assault occurring on cruise ships, where they are in international waters. The film was produced by Matilda Appelin and René Ezra of the Nordisk Film Production. Birthday Girl, which was produced for a budget of €3.5m, received financial backing from the Danish Film Institute, the Norwegian Film Institute and Nordisk Film & TV Fond. The director of photography was Adam Wallensten and the editor was Jacob Thuesen.

Birthday Girl was filmed in Estonia, receiving the Film Estonia cash rebate programme. The film was shot at Tallinn Harbour, using the ships that were docked in the harbour due to the COVID-19 pandemic. Some scenes were shot at the Tallink Spa & Conference hotel and the Black Box Studio in Viimsi. Beginning on 16 March 2022, filming occurred over 24 days and wrapped in April 2022. The film employed more than 600 extras, with a 100-member production team on location.

== Release ==
In November 2022, TrustNordisk sold the rights in Germany, Austria and Switzerland to Plaion and in Benelux to Cherry Pickers. Birthday Girl had its world premiere at the 2023 Zürich Film Festival. The film was screened at the Gothenburg Film Festival in January 2024. It had its United States premiere at the Santa Barbara International Film Festival the following month. The film was released in Denmark on April 4, 2024.

== Reception ==
The film was praised in a review by Tobias Åkesson of the Gothenburg Film Festival, who complimented the performances by Dyrholm and Hoffmann Lindahl. It was described as a "tight little melodrama" by The Guardian, although the twists were criticised as being contrived.
