= Pernille Fischer Christensen =

Danish film director

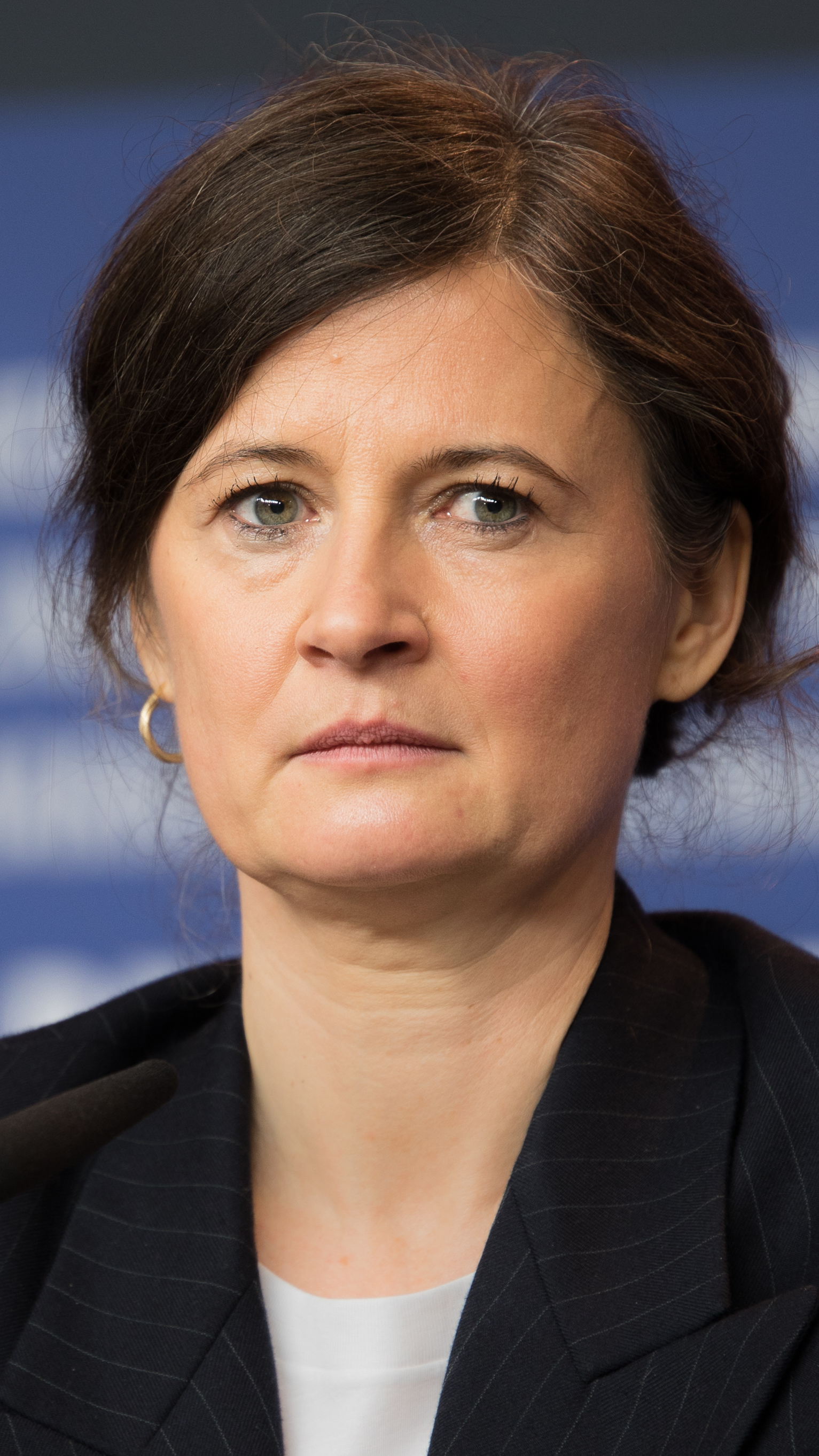
- Pernille Fischer Christensen 2018
- Born: 24 December 1969 (age 56); Denmark
- Occupations: Director, writer, actress
- Years active: 1989 – present
- Awards: Bodil Award; Silver Bear; Best First Feature Award

Pernille Fischer Christensen (born 24 December 1969) is a Danish film director and the older sister of actress Stine Fischer Christensen. She started out in the movie business when she was 20 years old as an assistant to Tómas Gislason. During that time, Gislason was closely connected to Lars von Trier, and she got to listen to Gislason and von Trier's discussions about movies. In 1993, she went to The European Film College where she met and collaborated with Nanna Arnfred. In 1999, she graduated from the National Film School of Denmark with the movie India, which later went on to win the Cinéfondations 3rd Prize at the Film festival in Cannes. After finishing film school she made a short film called Habibti My Love, which won a Robert in 2003 for best short subject.

Her first feature film, En Soap (English title: A Soap), came out in 2006 and centered on the relationship between a female beauty shop owner and the transsexual living downstairs. The movie starred Trine Dyrholm as the beauty shop owner and David Dencik as the transsexual Veronica, and was written as a collaboration between Pernille Fischer Christensen and Kim Fupz Aakeson. The movie opened at the Berlin Film Festival and won a Silver Bear Jury Grand Prix Award, and was the first ever winner of the Best First Feature Award. Later the movie also won several prizes in Denmark, including a Bodil for best movie. The movie was also nominated for 15 Robert Awards, including Best Movie and Best Screenplay. It did however only win only four awards, Best Actor, Best Actress, Best Editor and Best Make-up.

Her next feature film is called Dancers, and the writing has again been a collaboration between Pernille Fischer Christensen and Kim Fupz Aakeson. The movie is "centred round a dance school run by the bright and lively Annika and her no-nonsense mother". As was the case in A Soap, the movie starred Trine Dyrholm. The movie also starred Anders W. Berthelsen and Birthe Neumann. The Danish newspaper Information has listed Dancers as one of the 10 most expected movies of 2008.

Her 2010 film, A Family, was presented at the 60th Berlin International Film Festival.

== Filmography ==
=== Director ===
- Pigen som var søster (1997) aka The Girl Named Sister
- Indien (1999)
- Habibti min elskede (2002) aka Habibti My Love
- En Soap (2006) aka A Soap
- Dancers (2008) aka Dansen
- A Family (2010)
- Someone You Love (2014)
- Becoming Astrid (Becoming Astrid) (2018)

=== Writer ===
- Indien (1999)
- Habibti min elskede (2002) aka Habibti My Love
- En Soap (2006) aka A Soap
- Dancers (2008) aka Dansen
- En du elsker (2014) aka Someone you love

=== Actress ===
- Den blå munk (1998) as the new waitress
