= Charles W. Roback =

Swedish-American fraudster

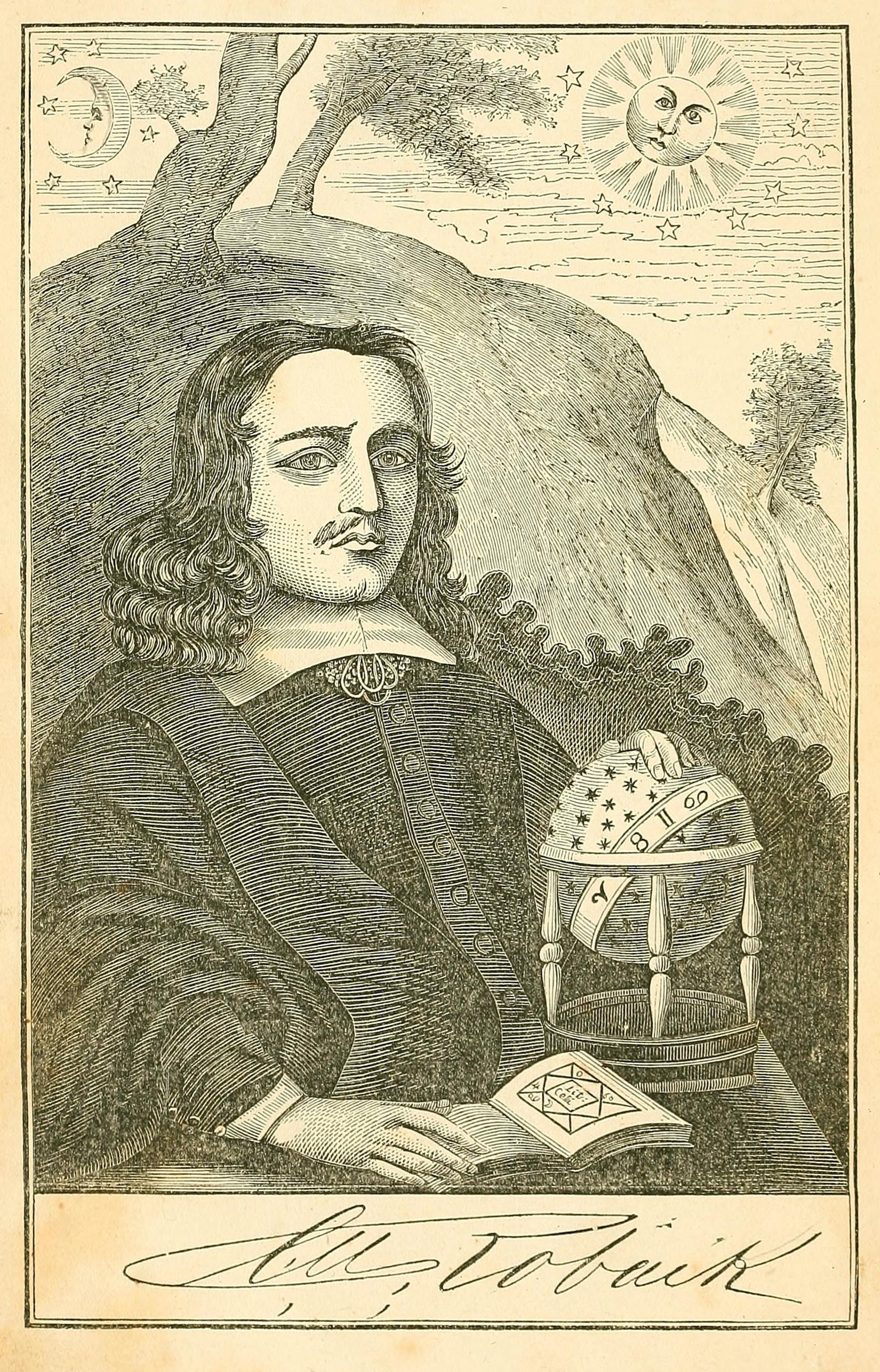

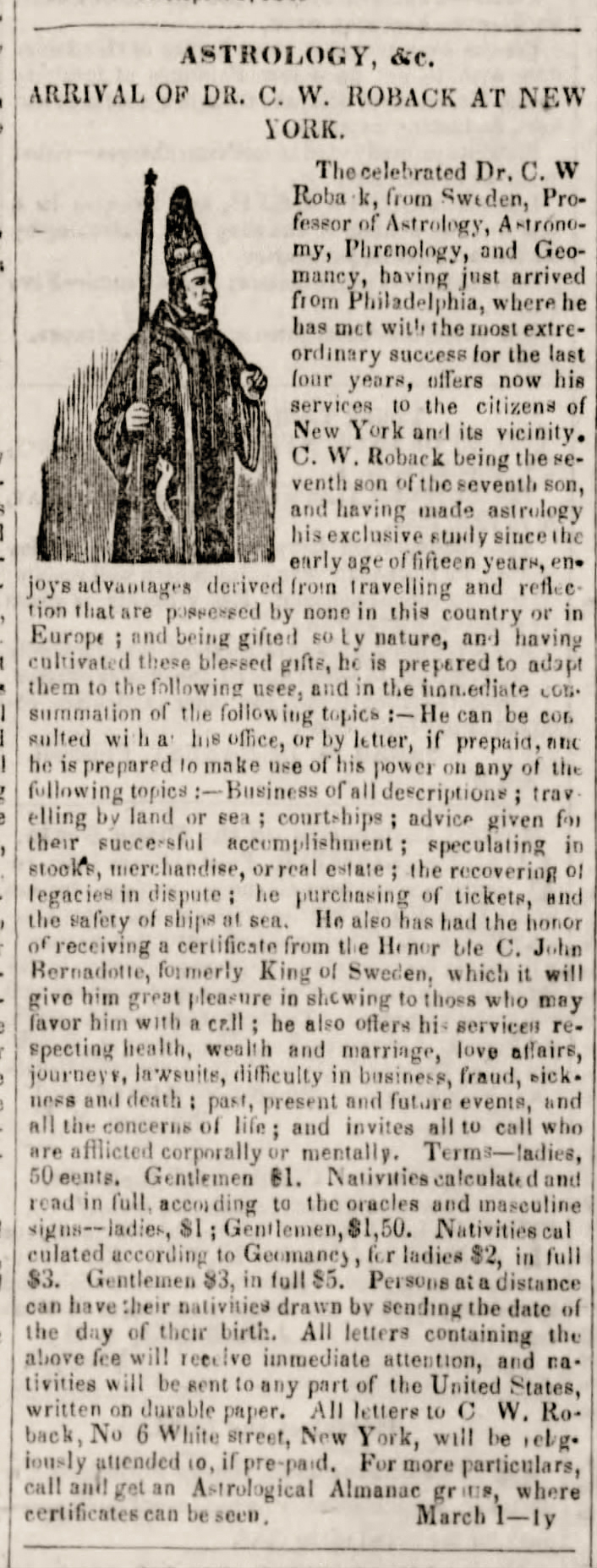
Dr. C. W. Roback advertisement (1852)

Dr. Charles W. Roback or Dr. C. W. Roback (22 May 1811 – 9 May 1867) was a manufacturer of patent medicines, an astrologist, a fortune teller, and a charlatan in the United States. Roback was nicknamed Fallebo Gök in his native Sweden, where he fled due to fraud charges in 1843.

== Career in Sweden ==
In 1838, Carl Johan Fallenius and his family left Kristdala parish and he became a merchant in Oskarshamn. His dry goods store failed and Fallenius went bankrupt. Fallenius then worked confidence schemes involving the stock market and commodity sales. Fallenius schemes were discovered and he fled the country. Outstanding loans of Falenius defaulted and it was then learned that that guarantor was fictitious and likely the local name for a wooden sculpture that served as a poor man's box at the church in Döderhult parish. In 1843, Fallenius was sentenced to two hours in handcuffs and five years of hard labor in prison, but Fallenius had already gone into exile.

== Career in the United States ==
Carl Johan Fallenius arrived in America in the 1840s and appears to have first worked in Baltimore under the name William Williamson aka Billy the Swede. About 1847 he moved to Philadelphia and became known as the astrologist Dr. Charles W. Roback. About 1851 Roback moved to New York City and then in 1853, Roback moved to Boston. In Boston, Roback was a founding member and largest donor to the New England Scandinavian Benevolent Relief Society. In 1854 he self-published his fantastical autobiography in Boston. Roback then left the United States briefly for Montreal, Canada and then moved to Cincinnati, Ohio where he was a resident in 1860. Roback became a manufacturer of patent medicines in Cincinnati and was successful nationally. After he died in 1867, his brand of cure-alls continued to be marketed.

The Swedish journalist Carl Axel Egerström visited Dr. C. W. Roback in Boston. Egerström wrote about Dr. Roback aka Fallebo Gök aka Carl Johan Fallenius in a series of articles published in Sweden.

== Family life ==
Charles W. Roback was born on 22 May 1811 in Fallebo, Kristdala parish, Kalmar län, and baptized Carl Johan Nilsson. Later he adopted the surname Fallenius. On 19 June 1833, he married Greta Cajsa Nilsdotter (1813-1871) in Målilla parish, Kalmar län and they had two sons: Nils Johan August (1834-1845) and Karl Wilhelm (1839-1927).

Carl Johan Fallenius abandoned his family when he fled prosecution in Sweden. His wife divorced and remarried. In the United States, under his adopted new name, Charles W. Roback married Mary H. Sinnickson (1832-1865) who was from a Quaker family in New Jersey. Charles W. Roback died on 9 May 1867 in Cincinnati, Ohio, USA.

Both Mary and Charles W. Roback were buried in the cemetery of her hometown in Mt. Holly, New Jersey.

Roback's son Carl Wilhelm Fallenius is said to have visited his father in the US and received financial help to buy a farm at home in Sweden. However, at the death of Roback, his son is said to have declined inheritance from his father.
