= Flora Ofelia =

Danish singer and actress (born 2005)

Dyrholm being interviewed by Nordisk Film along with Flora Ofelia about their work on the 2024 film "Birthday Girl"

Flora Ofelia Hofmann Lindahl (born July 14, 2005), better known as Flora Ofelia, is a Danish singer and actress who won the MGP 2015 singing competition with her song "Du Du Du" and has since appeared in the television series Cry Wolf (2020) and the feature film As in Heaven (2021).

== Early life ==
Hofmann Lindahl was born on July 14, 2005, and grew up in Bisserup in Southwest Zealand. Her sister, Freja-Bella, participated in the 2012 season of MGP Junior, a Danish youth song contest. Her father, Jesper Hofmann, is a composer, producer and member of the band Innocent Blood, while her mother is a hairdresser who owns the hair salon Madame Grøn in Næstved. To film the television series Cry Wolf, Hofmann Lindahl lived for almost a year in Vesterbro with her godparents. She attended the Herlufsholm School for elementary school and Sankt Annæ Gymnasium for high school.

== Career ==
Hofmann Lindahl won the 2015 season of MGP Junior at the age of nine with the song "Du Du Du". She released the song "Fantastic Fantasy" in the run-up to the 2016 season of MGP Junior, using the DKK 50,000 that she had won the previous year to produce a music video. In 2016, she voiced Sofie in the animated film Finding Santa. In 2018, she played the elf girl Neia in Land of Glass.

Hofmann Lindahl had her breakthrough in 2020, when she played the leading role of Holly in the DR1 series Cry Wolf, for which she received a Robert Award for Best Actress in a Leading Television Role in February 2021. She was the youngest person to win this award, at the age of 15. She was then cast in Tea Lindeburg's debut feature film As in Heaven, based on the 1912 autobiographical novel A Night of Death by Marie Bregendahl, in which Hofmann Lindahl played the lead role of Lise. She won the Silver Shell for Best Leading Performance for this role at the San Sebastián International Film Festival in September 2021. (Note: She shared the award with American actress Jessica Chastain, who won it for her role in The Eyes of Tammy Faye.) She was once again the youngest person to win this award. That same month, she signed a contract with the British agency United Agents.

In 2023, she appeared alongside Trine Dyrholm in Michael Noer's film Birthday Girl.

== Filmography ==
=== Film ===
Year	Title	Role	Notes
2016	Finding Santa	Sofie	Voice role
2018	Land of glass	Neia	
2021	As In Heaven	Lise	
2022	Tonser	Agnes	Short film
2023	Birthday Girl	Cille	
2024	Far	Asta	Short film
2024	Et Brud.	Her	Short film
2024	Madame Ida	Cecilia	
2025	Smukkere	Jasmin	
TBA	Rituals	Alice	Post-production

=== Television ===
Year	Title	Role	Notes
2020	Cry Wolf	Holly	

== Accolades ==
Award	Year	Catagry	Work	Result
Bodil Awards	2021	Best Actress	As In Heaven	Nominated
Bodil Awards	2021	TV 2 Talent Award	As In Heaven	Nominated
Bodil Awards	2025	Best Actor	Madame Ida	Nominated
Bodil Awards	2025	Best Supporting Actor	Birthday Girl	Nominated
Bodil Awards	2025	Best Ensemble	Madame Ida	Nominated
Melodi Grand Prix Junior	2015	-	Du Du Du	Won
Robert Awards	2021	Best Actress in a Leading Television Role	Cry Wolf	Won
Robert Awards	2023	Best Actress in a Leading Role	As In Heaven	Nominated
Robert Awards	2025	Best Actress in a Leading Role	Madame Ida	Nominated
Robert Awards	2025	Best Actress in a Supporting Role	Birthday Girl	Nominated
San Sebastián International Film Festival	2021	Best Leading Performance	As In Heaven	Won
Young Artist Awards	2019	Best Performance in a Feature Film: Leading Young Actress	Land of glass	Nominated
Torino Film Festival	2024	Best Performance	Madame Ida	Won
