= Poison (2024 film) =

- Directed by: Désirée Nosbusch
- Based on: Poison by Lot Vekemans
- Produced by: Alexandra Hoesdorff; Katharina Haase
- Starring: Tim Roth; Trine Dyrholm
- Production companies: Deal Productions; Phanta Film; Studio Hamburg UK
- Release date: July 5, 2024 (Munich)
- Running time: 88 minutes
- Countries: Luxembourg; Netherlands; Germany
- Language: English

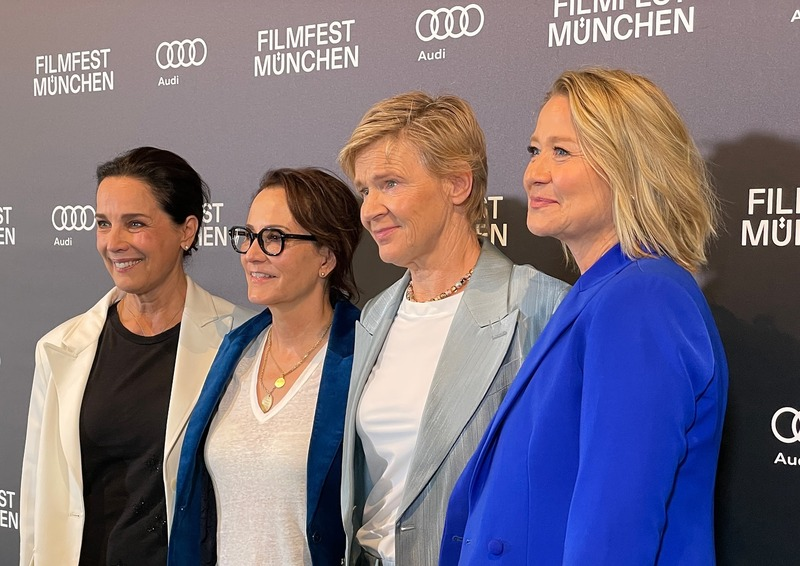
Désirée Nosbusch (left), Lot Vekemans (2nd from right) and Trine Dyrholm (right) presenting film "Poison" (2024) at 41st International Film Festival in Munich, Germany, July, 2024

Poison is a 2024 Luxembourgian-Dutch-German drama film directed by Désirée Nosbusch and starring Tim Roth and Trine Dyrholm. It is based on the 2010 play of the same name by Lot Vekemans. It is also Nosbusch's feature directorial debut.

== Plot ==
The story takes place on the day of the meeting of a divorced couple, Tim Roth and Trine Dyrholm, in the cemetery where there son is buried. They remember the events of his death and their separation afterwards. They discuss their lives in a stormy and emotional way.

== Cast ==
- Tim Roth
- Trine Dyrholm

== Production ==
Filming took place in Luxembourg and the Netherlands and wrapped in March 2022.

== Release ==
The film had its world premiere at Filmfest München on July 5, 2024.
