= Jacob Lohmann =

Danish actor (born 1974)

Jacob Ulrik Lohmann (born 4 February 1974), sometimes credited as Jacob Hauberg Lohmann, is a Danish actor of stage and screen. He has appeared in many films, such as Enforcement (2020) and the award-winning Icelandic drama Godland (2022). He has also appeared in many Danish television series, and is perhaps best known for his lead role in the crime drama series Oxen (2023–).

== Early life and education ==
Jacob Ulrik Lohmann was born in Odense, southern Denmark, on 4 February 1974, the son of actor Lars Lohmann.

He graduated from the acting school at Aarhus Theatre in 2002.

== Career ==
=== Stage ===
Lohmann was affiliated with Aalborg Theatre from 2002 until 2004, where he performed in productions of Ulysses von Ithacia, Købmanden i Venedig, King Lear, and the rock opera Jesus Christ Superstar. In 2004, he performed in Macbeth at the Mungo Park Theatre in Allerød.

He starred in the productions Ronja Røverdatter and in Et Juleeventyr ("A Christmas Adventure") at the Folketeatret in Copenhagen.

=== Screen ===
Lohmann has also appeared in many films, including A Conspiracy of Faith (2016), The Guilty (2018; voice actor, as Bo), Riders of Justice (2020), Godland (2022), and Sons (2024).

Playing in the 2020 crime action film Enforcement (Shorta), he was credited as Jacob Hauberg Lohmann. He said in an interview afterwards that watching the film at Glasgow Film Festival was a personal highlight for him. He plays the tense, "easily triggered" cop Mike Andersen, opposite Simon Sears, who plays his calm colleague Jens Hoyer, after a 19-year-old Arab youth is killed by police in Svalegarden ghetto in Copenhagen. Their performances were praised by reviewer Darryl Griffiths on Movie Marker, who gave the film 5 out of 5 stars.

He played the recurring role of Mik in the Danish police drama series Anna Pihl (2006-2008), and has also starred in many other series, including as Søren in Bedrag (Follow the Money; 2016-2019), Below the Surface (Gidseltagningen; 2017), Those Who Kill (2019) , and as the lead character, Oxen, in Oxen (2023–).

In 2019, he stars in Frederikke Aspöck's dark comedy film De Frivillige (released as Out of Tune), along with Søren Malling, Christopher Læssø, and Anders Matthesen. It was released on Netflix on 1 October 2025.

The series When the Dust Settles (Når støvet har lagt sig, 2020), which screened in the UK in September 2021 on Walter Presents, centres on eight characters who are caught up in a terrorist attack on a Copenhagen restaurant. Lohmann plays Morten Dalsgård, the father of a son who works as a dishwasher in the restaurant,

Lohmann stars as Johannes in the 2024 romantic comedy series Chaos (originally titled Kaos), directed by Lars Kaalund. The cast includes Katrine Greis-Rosenthal and Hadi Ka-Koush in lead roles, along with Amanda Collin, Kurt Ravn, and many others. Chaos was released on Viaplay UK on 18 May 2025 and Viaplay USA on 22 May 2025.

Lohmann has been cast in Alexander Payne's forthcoming comedy-drama Somewhere Out There, which is Payne's first film shot in Europe.

== Nominations and awards ==
Lohmann was nominated for the Robert Award for Best Actor in a Leading Role for his role as Mike Andersen in Enforcement at the 38th Robert Awards in 2021, but Mads Mikkelson won the award that year for his performance in Another Round.

At the 40th Robert Awards in 2023, Lohmann was nominated for the Best Actor in a Supporting Role award for his role in Godland. Arash Ashtiani won the award that year for his performance in Holy Spider.

At the 41st Robert Awards in 2024, Lohmann was nominated for Best Actor in a Leading Television Role, but lost out to David Dencik for his role in Prisoner (Huset).

== Personal life ==
Lohmann married makeup artist Louise Hauberg Lohmann. She was nominated for the Robert Award for Best Makeup in the 2021 awards.

== Selected filmography ==
=== Film ===
- A Conspiracy of Faith (2016)
- The Guilty (2018)
- That Time of Year (2018)
- Out of Tune (De Frivillige; 2019)
- Riders of Justice (2020)
- Enforcement (Shorta; 2020)
- Godland (2022)
- Ehrengard: The Art of Seduction (2023)
- The Promised Land (2023)
- Sons (2024)

=== TV ===
- Anna Pihl (2006-2008)
- The Killing, s3 (2012)
- Bedrag (Follow the Money; 2016-2019)
- Below the Surface (Gidseltagningen; 2017)
- Those Who Kill (2019)
- Overleverne (2021)
- When the Dust Settles (Når støvet har lagt sig; 2020)
- Oxen (2023–)
- Chaos (2024)
- Dynastiet Mærsk (2025-6)
