= A Soap =

En Soap
- DVD cover
- Directed by: Pernille Fischer Christensen
- Written by: Kim Fupz Aakeson; Pernille Fischer Christensen
- Produced by: Lars Bredo Rahbek
- Starring: Trine Dyrholm; David Dencik
- Cinematography: Erik Molberg Hansen
- Edited by: Asa Mossberg
- Music by: Magnus Jarlbo; Sebastian Öberg
- Production companies: Nimbus Film; Zentropa
- Release date: 7 April 2006
- Running time: 104 minutes
- Country: Denmark
- Language: Danish

En Soap (A Soap or Soap) is a 2006 Danish melodramatic comedy film directed by Pernille Fischer Christensen which incorporates many of the austere techniques of Dogme style. The movie, starring Trine Dyrholm and David Dencik, follows the turbulent relationship between an abrasive beauty clinic owner and a depressed pre-op transgender woman. Made on a budget of 1.5 million dollars, it was the first feature film directed by Christensen.

== Cast ==
- Trine Dyrholm as Charlotte
- David Dencik as Veronica
- Frank Thiel as Kristian
- Elsebeth Steentoft as Veronica's Mother
- Christian Tafdrup as Costumer
- Pauli Ryberg as Costumer
- Jakob Ulrik Lohmann as One-Night Stand
- Claes Bang as One-Night Stand
- Christian Mosbæk as the Narrator (voice)

== Reception ==
The film received mixed reviews. Some critics dismissed it for low-budget productions values and depressing characters, while others praised it for the quirky performances and Christensen's inventive techniques. The film won critical praise at film festivals and earned Christensen both a Jury Grand Prix Silver Bear and the Best First Feature Film Award at the 2006 Berlin Film Festival. A Soap received the Bodil Award for the 2007 Danish Film of the Year. Dyrholm's leading role earned her a third Bodil Award for Best Actress in a Leading Role.
