= Finding Santa =

2016 stop-motion Christmas film

- Danish: Den magiske juleæske
- Directed by: Jacob Ley
- Screenplay by: Jacob Ley; Sanne Munk Jensen
- Produced by: Fie Ørnsø; Anne Sofie Hansen-Skovmoes; Rodrigo Villalobos
- Production company: Copenhagen Bombay
- Release date: 10 November 2016
- Running time: 90 minutes
- Country: Denmark
- Language: Danish

Finding Santa (Danish: Den magiske juleæske; also known as Get Santa) is a 2016 Danish stop motion Christmas fantasy film directed by Jacob Ley and written by Ley and Sanne Munk Jensen.

== Premise ==
Julius, an orphan, loves Christmas, and secretly owns a box of Christmas items. One day, the box magically swallows Julius and takes him to a wintery world called Winterland, where all the figures from his box have come to life. There, they tell him that Santa has been missing for some time and that the power in Winterland has been taken over by the evil Krampus, and it is up to Julius to help them save Christmas.

== Voice cast ==
- Herman Knop as Julius
- Rasmus Bjerg as Krampus
- Claus Bue as Santa Claus
- Albert Rudbeck Lindhardt as Gregers
- Bodil Jørgensen as Inger
- Lars Hjortshøj as Herman
- Maria Lucia Rosenberg as Såfina
- Uffe Ellemann-Jensen as Poul
- Malte Houe as Piv
- Flora Ofelia as Sofie
