= Oxen (TV series) =

Danish television series

Oxen is a Danish television series, based on the crime novel series of the same name by Danish crime writer Jens Henrik Jensen. The series was adapted by husband and wife writing duo Mai Brostrøm and Peter Thorsboe. The first series was broadcast in Denmark in October 2023, with the second series following in 2025. The series has been sold internationally, and broadcast in Germany, the UK, and Australia.

== Synopsis ==
=== Series 1 ===
The protagonist of the series is war veteran Niels Oxen. After he has been expelled from the special forces based on false evidence, he develops PTSD and he isolates himself in the woods with his dog, losing contact with his wife Birgitte and son Magnus. After local dogs start dying, followed by deaths of local people, Oxen accepts a request from PET, (the Danish intelligence service) head to help the investigation. He works alongside PET detective Margrethe Franck.

== Cast ==
=== Main ===
- Jacob Lohmann as Niels Oxen
- Josephine Park as PET detective Margrethe Franck
- Ellen Hillingsø as Frigg Mossmann, head of PET
- Mikael Birkkjær as Johnny Gregersen
- Henrik Birch as Hans Otto Corfitzen
- Birgitte Hjort Sørensen as Kajsa Corfitzen
- Sandra Yi Sencindiver as Sara Kaspersen
- Thue Ersted Rasmussen as Martin Rytter
- Reinout Scholten van Aschat
- Luise Belfort
- Julie Burkhardt

== Production ==
The Oxen series of books has been published in many European countries, including Germany, where they have become bestsellers. As of January 2026 there are six books in the series, but none has been translated into English.

The first series was produced for the Danish TV channel TV 2 and ZDF in Germany in collaboration with SquareOne Productions (part of Vuelta Group). The series is created by husband and wife writing duo Mai Brostrøm and Peter Thorsboe, adapted from the book series of the same name by Danish crime writer Jens Henrik Jensen. The pair have written several successful series, including Unit One, The Eagle, and The Protectors, winning three Emmy Awards.

The first series, which comprises six parts, was directed by Danish filmmaker Jannik Johansen.

Series two was produced by Swedish production house SF Studios in partnership with SquareOne Productions and the Estonian Nafta Films. Filming took place in Jutland, Copenhagen, and Funen in Denmark, as well as some scenes in Lithuania, moving into post-production in January 2025. International sales are handled by REinvent.

== Release ==
Series 1 premiered in Denmark on 22 October 2023 on TV 2 Play, and on 29 October on TV 2. It was broadcast on ZDF in Germany later in the year.

Series 1 was broadcast on Channel 4 in the UK, first on its streaming platform on 15 November 2024, and then on free-to-air Channel 4 television on 17 November. In Australia, the first series streamed on SBS on Demand.

Series 2 premiered on TV 2 and TV 2 Play in Denmark on 26 October 2025, and is scheduled for release on ZDF in Germany in 2026.
