= Next Door Spy =

Danish animated film

- English-language poster
- Danish: Nabospionen
- Directed by: Karla von Bengtson
- Screenplay by: Karla von Bengtson
- Produced by: Mette Valbjørn Skøtt; Fie Ørnsø
- Edited by: Linda Jildmalm
- Music by: Nathan Larson; Lanre Odunlami
- Distributed by: Copenhagen Bombay; TriCoast Entertainment
- Release date: 10 August 2017
- Running time: 77 minutes
- Country: Denmark
- Language: Danish

Next Door Spy (Danish: Nabospionen)—also known as Agathe Christine: Next Door Spy—is a 2017 Danish 2D-animated detective film written and directed by Karla von Bengtson (in her feature directorial debut). Released on 10 August 2017 by Copenhagen Bombay, an English dub was released on 16 June 2020 by TriCoast Entertainment. Despite the film's name, the plot has no relation to any of Agatha Christie's detective novels.

== Premise ==
Agathe Christine, or AC as she calls herself, wants to become a real detective, and establishes her own makeshift detective bureau in the basement of her home. One day, she meets a mysterious boy, Vincent, in a local shop, leading her to devote her full time and energy to surveilling him.

== Voice cast ==
The Danish voice cast for the film.

- Simone Edemann Møgelbjerg as Agathe "AC" Christine
- Oliver Bøtcher Herlevsen as Vincent
- Kristine Sloth as Sanne
- Anne-Grethe Bjarup Riis as Mor
- Søs Egelind as Varanen
- Tommy Kenter as Kiosk-Arne
- Dar Salim as Vincent's father
- Albert Rudbeck Lindhardt as Vincent's brother
- Harald Kaiser Hermann as skater boy
- Mille Lunderskov as selfie girl
- Viggo Bengtson as Lillebror Bertil
- Annevig Schelde Ebbe as the GPS voice

== Release and reception ==
Next Door Spy was released in Danish cinemas on 10 August 2017 by Copenhagen Bombay. An English dub was released on 16 June 2020 by TriCoast Entertainment. Critically, it received generally positive reviews in Denmark, but foreign reception was mixed. The story and characters received praise, but criticism was directed at the English dub's profanity and the talking lizard character as unnecessary.

Jacob Wendt Jensen, writing for Berlingske, gave the film five out of six stars, stating that the plot "is both exciting, charming and offers surprises," further adding "Next Door Spy can engage anyone who has the heart and their curiosity in the cinema." Bobby LePire of Film Threat, who gave the film a more critical score of one out of ten, was particularly critical of Agathe Christine's mother, stating that her not trying to understand Agathe's detective hobby made her "one of the worst, most unsympathetic parents in any movie who does not actively abuse or neglect their offspring."
