= Njet Molotoff =

1942 Finnish song

Original 1942 audio recording by Matti Jurva and Tatu Pekkarinen.

"Njet Molotoff" (Note: The title is sometimes rendered as "Niet Molotoff" and "Nyet Molotoff". The word njet directly comes from Russian нет, meaning 'no'. It is used to mock the Russian language; the Finnish word for 'no' is ei.) (lit. 'No, Molotov') is a Finnish propaganda song composed by Matti Jurva, and written by Tatu Pekkarinen. "Niet Molotoff" was composed during the Continuation War to boost morale and to mock the Soviet Union and the Red Army.

"Njet Molotoff" was first recorded in 1942 by Jurva and Kristalli-Tanssiorkesteri, the song was conducted by George de Godzinsky, and the orchestral accompaniment was arranged by Robert von Essen. The song was made well known by Solistiyhtye Suomi in 1989.

== Contents ==
"Njet Molotoff" is named after Vyacheslav Molotov, the Soviet Minister of Foreign Affairs. The song's chorus declares Molotov's justifications for the Winter War to be "worse" than the "lies" of Nikolay Bobrikov, who was a Governor-General of Finland notorious for his attempts to promote the Russification of Finland, later being assassinated for his actions. The song ridicules the Red Army's slow advance and their failed plans to quickly occupy Helsinki as they struggled to even breach the Mannerheim line, claiming Soviet officials lost their previous boastful attitude as the war went on. It also mocks Molotov having a countryside estate, where the Soviet political officials would retreat to. These would include "Stalin[,] other charlatans" and possibly Reds who had fled to Petrozavodsk after the Finnish Civil War.

Many Russian-language words are used in the song in place of Finnish-language alternatives.

The melody of the song is based on a Russian folk song called Ukhar-kupets (Ухарь-купец), from which the Yiddish song "Daloy Politsey" is also derived.

== Parodies ==
During the Russian invasion of Ukraine in 2022, a Ukrainian parody of "Njet Molotoff" was created. The Ukrainian version of the song is titled "Njet Vladimir", in reference to Vladimir Putin.

During Donald Trump's second term of Presidency There is also a Canadian parody of "Njet Molotoff", the Canadian version is titled "No, Donald Trump!" in reference to Donald Trump's claims of saying Canada could be the 51st state of the USA.

== Original lyrics ==
Finnish lyrics

Finlandia, Finlandia,
sinne taas matkalla oli Iivana.
Kun Molotoffi lupas´ juu kaikki harosii,
huomenna jo Helsingissä syödään marosii.
Njet Molotoff, njet Molotoff,
valehtelit enemmän kuin itse Bobrikoff.

Finlandia, Finlandia,
Mannerheimin linja oli vastus ankara.
Kun Karjalasta alkoi hirmu tulitus,
loppui monen Iivanan puhepulistus.
Njet Molotoff, njet Molotoff,
valehtelit enemmän kuin itse Bobrikoff.

Finlandia, Finlandia,
sitä pelkää voittamaton Puna-Armeija.
Ja Molotoffi sanoi että katsos torppas niin,
Tsuhna aikoo käydä meitä kraivelista kii.
Njet Molotoff, njet Molotoff,
valehtelit enemmän kuin itse Bobrikoff.

Uralin taa, Uralin taa,
siellä onpi Molotoffin torpan maa.
Sinne pääsee Stalinit ja muutkin huijarit,
politrukit, komissaarit ja petroskoijarit.
Njet Molotoff, njet Molotoff,
valehtelit enemmän kuin itse Bobrikoff.

English translation

Finlandia, Finlandia,
that's where the Ivans were heading again.
When Molotov promised: "Yes, everything will go fine,
tomorrow we'll already be eating ice-cream in Helsinki."
No Molotov, no Molotov
you told more lies than Bobrikov himself.

Finlandia, Finlandia,
The Mannerheim line was a harsh obstacle.
When artillery began firing from Karelia,
many Ivans stopped their babbling
No Molotov, no Molotov
you told more lies than Bobrikov himself.

Finlandia, Finlandia,
the invincible Red Army is afraid of it.
And Molotov said: "Well look at that,
the Chukhnas are coming at our throats!"
No Molotov, no Molotov
you told more lies than Bobrikov himself.

Behind the Urals, behind the Urals,
is the cottage of Molotov.
People like Stalin and other cheaters are let to visit it,
including politruks, commissars and crooks from Petrozavodsk.
No Molotov, no Molotov
you told more lies than Bobrikov himself.

== See also ==
- Chukhna, a Russian slur for Finns referenced in the song
