= Riders of Justice =

2020 Danish action comedy film

- Theatrical release poster
- Directed by: Anders Thomas Jensen
- Written by: Anders Thomas Jensen
- Produced by: Sidsel Hybschmann; Sisse Graum Jørgensen
- Starring: Mads Mikkelsen; Nikolaj Lie Kaas; Andrea Heick Gadeberg; Lars Brygmann; Nicolas Bro
- Cinematography: Kasper Tuxen
- Edited by: Anders Albjerg Kristiansen; Nicolaj Monberg
- Music by: Jeppe Kaas
- Production company: Zentropa Entertainments
- Distributed by: Nordisk Film
- Release date: November 19, 2020
- Running time: 116 minutes
- Country: Denmark
- Languages: Danish; Estonian
- Budget: €5.3 million ($6.4 million)
- Box office: $7.2 million

Riders of Justice (Danish: Retfærdighedens Ryttere) is a 2020 Danish action comedy film, written and directed by Anders Thomas Jensen. The film was released in Denmark on 19 November 2020, receiving acclaim from critics.

== Plot ==
Mathilde loses her mother in a train collision and her father, Markus, a soldier serving in Afghanistan, comes home to look after his young daughter. Mathilde and Markus find it difficult to come to terms with the tragedy, causing strain in their relationship, with Markus rejecting counselling. Markus is approached by a man named Otto (who was on the same train with Markus's wife) who informs him that the collision wasn't accidental, but rather a murder to eliminate a key witness about to give evidence against the leader of the "Riders of Justice" motorbike-criminal gang.

With the help of Otto's hacker friends, Lennart and Emmenthaler, the group identifies a suspicious man who left the train seconds before the accident as the brother of the Riders of Justice's leader. The group goes to the man's house, intending to interrogate him for information about the accident, but Markus loses control when the man threatens them with a gun and kills him out of anger. Lennart disposes of the evidence, encountering a bound young Ukrainian boy named Bodashka. The Riders interrogate Bodashka for information, leading to their identification of Emmenthaler.

The Riders attempt a drive-by shooting on the group, but Markus is able to kill the attackers and rescue Bodashka. Mathilde sees Markus and the three hackers talking, but Lennart lies and explains that they are actually a therapy group attempting to help Markus with his trauma. The group then attack a Riders meeting, killing several of them.

As the ensemble prepares another hit on the Riders of Justice, Bodashka explains that the suspicious man was not on the train; Lennart and Otto had convinced Emmenthaler to accept a less accurate facial recognition result, and the suspicious man was actually an Egyptian tourist, meaning that their crusade against the Riders of Justice was committed in error, and the evidence they relied on was a simple coincidence. Markus, learning this, breaks down in anger and frustration, finally lowering his stony facade and crying.

The next day, the Riders follow clues in Mathilde's boyfriend's social media and attack the group at Markus' house. Several of the group are injured and, while Markus kills several, Mathilde is taken hostage, and Markus surrenders. However, Otto, Lennart, and Bodashka (Emmenthaler does not shoot), using weapons training Markus gave them earlier, emerge and kill the Riders, saving Markus, Mathilde and her boyfriend.

A few months later, at Christmas, the entire group join to celebrate and open presents, and Markus and Mathilde have reconciled.

== Cast ==
- Mads Mikkelsen as Markus Hansen
- Nikolaj Lie Kaas as Otto Hoffmann
- Andrea Heick Gadeberg as Mathilde Hansen
- Lars Brygmann as Lennart
- Nicolas Bro as Emmenthaler
- Gustav Lindh as Bodashka
- Roland Møller as Kurt
- Albert Rudbeck Lindhardt as Sirius
- Anne Birgitte Lind as Emma Hansen
- Omar Shargawi as Palle Olesen / Aharon Nahas Shadid
- Jacob Lohmann as Kenneth
- Henrik Noël Olesen as Noah
- Gustav Dyekjær Giese as Adrian

== Reception ==
=== Box office ===
The movie opened to Danish cinemas on November 19, 2020, selling 150,486 tickets for the opening weekend and pre-premieres; beating out Another Round for best selling opening weekend in Denmark that year.

=== Critical response ===
On the review aggregator website Rotten Tomatoes, 96% of 141 critics' reviews are positive, with an average rating of 8/10. The website's critics consensus reads: "A darkly humorous revenge thriller with satisfying depth and a dash of savory quirk, Riders of Justice makes another compelling case for Mads Mikkelsen as an all-purpose leading man." Metacritic, which uses a weighted average, assigned the film a score of 81 out of 100, based on 25 critics, indicating "universal acclaim".

Matt Zoller Seitz, writing for RogerEbert.com, gave the film a full four stars, writing, "Brutal, sad, funny, and sweet-natured, Riders of Justice is not so much a revenge movie as a movie about revenge." Steve Rose of The Guardian gave the film four out of five stars, writing, "The screwball caper plot (written by director Anders Thomas Jensen and Nikolaj Arcel) is so far-fetched and tonally wayward, it shouldn't work at all, but somehow it all comes together, almost in Coen Brothers style." Jay Weissberg, in a review for Variety, wrote of the film, "Deliciously wry and so perfectly balanced it should be a case study in script classes, Riders of Justice may be the film that gives Anders Thomas Jensen international recognition beyond his usual spotlight as a sought-after screenwriter."

The film was met with a favorable critical response from the Danish press. Politiken called Riders of Justice "Anders Thomas Jensen's best movie since Flickering Lights", giving it 5 out of 6 hearts.

B.T. remarked that the movie does not have as many memorable scenes as a number of Anders Thomas Jensen's previous movies, but has as significant an emotional impact as Another Round, another film released that year with Mikkelsen in a leading role.

== Remake ==
In late May 2024 it was reported that an English-language remake is in development, with Tyler Nilson and Michael Schwartz directing and writing the screenplay, while Shawn Levy, Dan Levine, and Dan Cohen will serve as producers.
