= Kristian Bang Foss =

Danish writer (born 1977)

Kristian Bang Foss (born 1977) is a Danish writer. His debut novel Fiskens vindue (The Window of the Fish, 2004) was acclaimed by critics. This was followed by Stormen i 99 (The Storm in 99, 2008). He won the European Union Prize for Literature for his novel Døden kører Audi (Death drives an Audi, 2012).
