= Mr. Nice Guy (EP) =

Single by Trine Dyrholm

from the album Mr. Nice Guy
- Released: September 30, 2004
- Recorded: 2004
- Genre: Pop, Country
- Songwriters: Peter Lund Madsen, Anders Lund Madsen and Kim Larsen

Mr Nice Guy is an EP by Danish actress, singer songwriter Trine Dyrholm containing three songs ("Avenuen", "Spejlet" and "Stille") composed for the comedy show of same name "Mr. Nice Guy" showing at the Bellevue Teatret.

The lyrics of the released EP are those of Peter Lund Madsen and Anders Lund Madsen and music is by Kim Larsen. The songs were sung by the leading actress for the comedy play Trine Dylholm and musical accompaniment by Emil de Waal's band.

== Track list ==
1. "Avenuen" (3:18)
2. "Spejlet" (3:13)
3. "Stille" (2:56)

== Chart performance ==
The EP was released on 30 September 2004 and became a phenomenal success on the Danish Singles Chart staying at the #1 spot for a total of 62 weeks) during 2005 and 2007. The EP spent altogether 135 weeks on the Danish charts.
