= Anna Maria Klemming =

Swedish operatic soprano (1864–1889)

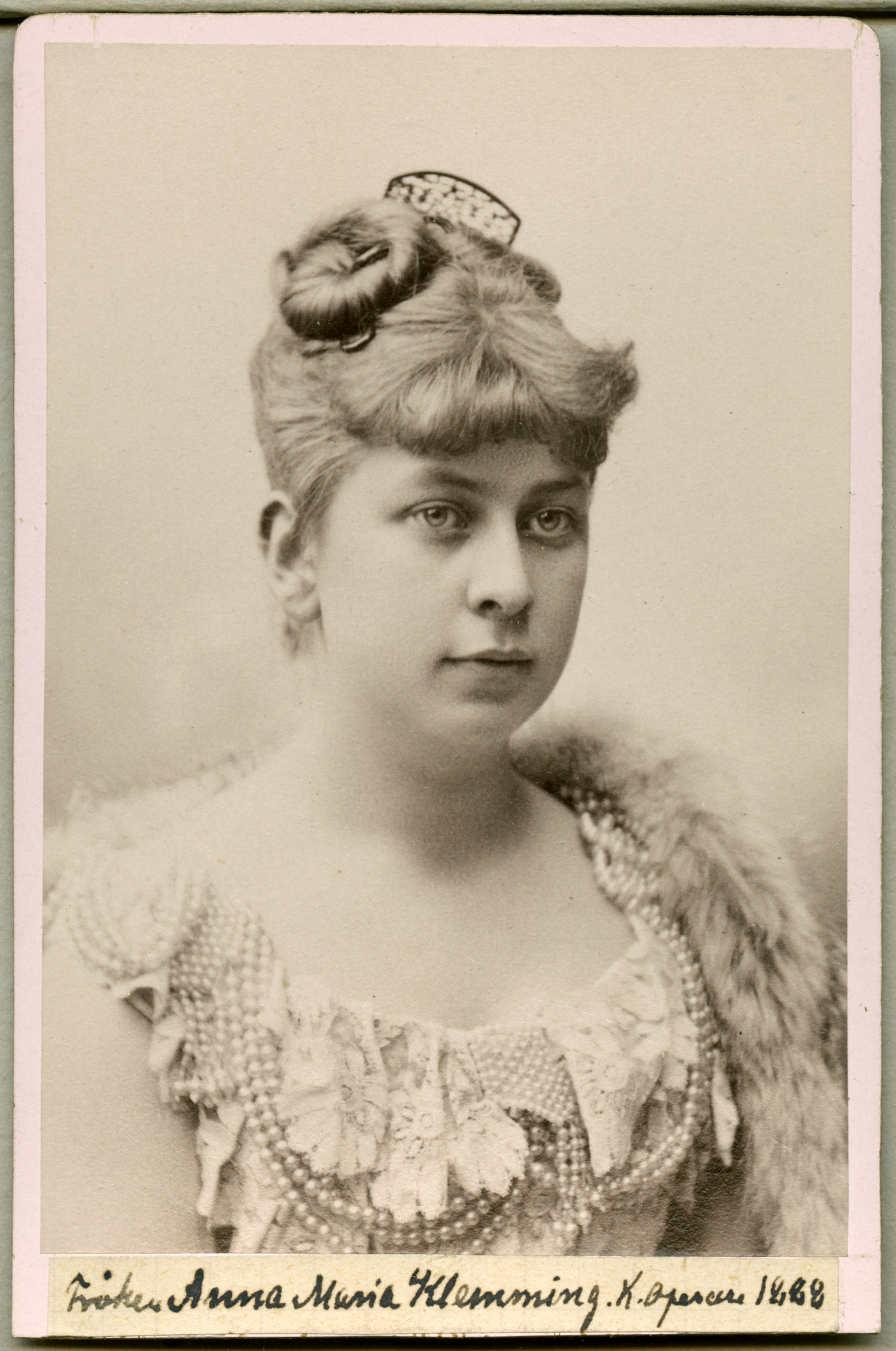
- Anna Maria Klemming in 1888
- Born: 6 February 1864; Solna, Sweden
- Died: 8 August 1889 (aged 25); Stockholm
- Education: Stockholm Conservatory
- Occupation: Operatic soprano
- Organization: Royal Swedish Opera

Anna Maria Klemming (1864–1889) was a Swedish operatic soprano who made her debut in April 1887 at the Royal Swedish Opera as Mathilde in Rossini's William Tell. Over the next two years, thanks to her clear, high-reaching voice and her attractive Nordic looks, she performed the leading soprano roles in the company's repertoire. She was particularly successful in 1888 as Julia in Gounod's Roméo et Juliette. Her successful career was short, ending abruptly with her untimely death in August 1889.

== Early life and education ==
Born in Solna on 6 February 1864, Anna Maria Klemming was the daughter of the tinsmith Vilhelm Klemming and his wife Elisabet née Burman. She studied at the Stockholm Conservatory under Hjalmar Håkansson (1882–85) and later in Copenhagen under Fritz Arlberg (1885–87).

== Career ==
Klemming's first public appearance was at a concert in Malmö in 1886 while still a student in Denmark. Press reports commented on her simple yet excellent tone and her educated delivery. After further concert appearances in both Denmark and Sweden, she initially planned to join the Royal Danish Opera but instead returned to Sweden.

Klemming made her stage debut on 24 April 1887 at the Royal Theatre in Stockholm as Mathilde in Rossini's William Tell but was far more enthusiastically acclaimed on 13 June when she appeared as Julia in Gounod's Roméo et Juliette. Her performance paved the way for her future as a soloist, after the departure of both Selma Ek and Mathilda Grabow.

Her dramatic roles included Agathe in Weber's Der Freischütz, Elsa in Wagner's Lohengrin and Venus in Tannhäuser while she also appeared in leading lyrical roles such as Marguerite in Gounod's Faust and the Marchesa in Verdi's Un giorno di regno. She created the role of the Princess in the world premiere of Ivar Hallström's Per Svinaherde (1887). One of her last appearances was the demanding role of Valentine in Meyerbeer's Les Huguenots where she reached such high notes that she was immediately considered the prima donna of the company.

Although Klemming had felt ill at times during the spring of 1989, she continued to perform until 15 June. She died in Stockholm on 8 August 1889, apparently as a result of over-exhaustion.
