= Nicolai Berendt =

Danish musician

Nicolai Berendt (27 July 1826 – 1889) was a Danish pianist and composer.

He debuted as a pianist in November 1846 at the Royal Theater of Denmark with a piano concerto by Johann Nepomuk Hummel. In 1851–53, he studied composition and piano in Vienna and lived thereafter as the piano teacher and concert pianist in Hanover.
