= Enforcement (film) =

2020 Danish crime action film

- Theatrical release poster
- Danish: Shorta
- Directed by: Anders Ølholm; Frederik Louis Hviid
- Written by: Anders Ølholm; Frederik Louis Hviid
- Produced by: Signe Leick Jensen; Morten Kaufmann
- Starring: Jacob Hauberg Lohmann; Simon Sears; Tarek Zayat
- Cinematography: Jacob Møller
- Edited by: Anders Albjerg Kristiansen
- Music by: Martin Dirkov
- Production company: Toolbox Film
- Distributed by: Scanbox Entertainment
- Release dates: 5 September 2020 (Venice); 8 October 2020 (Denmark)
- Running time: 108 minutes
- Country: Denmark
- Language: Danish
- Box office: $53,189

Enforcement (Danish: Shorta) is a 2020 Danish crime action film directed by Anders Ølholm and Frederik Louis Hviid in their feature directorial debut. The film premiered at the 77th Venice International Film Festival in the 35th International Critics' Week on 5 September 2020, and it is about two patrol officers who find themselves trapped when unrest spreads after news arrives that a young foreigner of the ghetto has died while in police custody.

== Plot ==
Jens Høyer and Mike Andersen are officer on routine patrol in the ghetto of Svalegården, a fictional neighbourhood of Copenhagen. The mood among the foreign population is heated because an arrested Senegalese, 19-year-old Talib Ben Hassi, was seriously injured in police custody and is in danger of life. Subsequently, when the death of the young Talib is made known, the two agents, engaged in a search, are attacked and their car is set on fire. Jens and Mike will then have to survive the people's desire for revenge.

== Cast ==
- Jacob Hauberg Lohmann
- Simon Sears
- Tarek Zayat as Amos Al-Shami
- Dulfi Al-Jabouri as Sami
- Issa Khattab as Iza
- Özlem Sağlanmak

== Production ==
Shorta is an Arabic word for police. The film is a crime action film written by Anders Ølholm and directed by Anders Ølholm and Frederik Louis Hviid.

Cinematography was by Jacob Møller, while Anders Albjerg Kristiansen was responsible for editing the film. Music was by Martin Dirkov.

== Release ==
The film had its world premiere at the 77th Venice International Film Festival in the 35th International Critics' Week on 5 September 2020.

It had a Danish theatrical release on 8 October 2020.

Shorta was released in UK cinemas on 13 August 2021. It had a limited theatrical release in North America by Magnolia Pictures and was released on VOD by Magnet Releasing on 19 March 2021. It was internationally released on 4 June 2021, later becoming available on DVD.

== Reception ==
=== Critical response ===
The film was met with universal acclaim by Danish critics. The film was declared a “masterpiece” and “wildly impressive” by national newspapers Berlingske and Information respectively and “an instant classic” by music magazine Soundvenue, while film magazine Ekko applauded its frenetic, muscular cinematic style and “bone-crushing action” never before seen in Danish cinema.

The film also garnered favourable reviews in the U.K. and the U.S. Variety's Peter Debruge hailed it as “an intelligent and gripping, nonstop thriller”. British film magazine Little White Lies called it “a gripping story told with purpose”.

Allan Hunter from ScreenDaily applauded the film in his Venice review stating: "This impressive first feature from Anders Ølholm and Frederik Louis Hviid confronts police brutality, racial tension and social division in a muscular, compelling thriller that proudly carries the influence of Walter Hill and John Carpenter."

Empire Magazine gave it four out of five stars, praised it for its exciting, tense, inventive, well-staged set-pieces and called it “a tense actioner, anchored by powerful performances.”

On review aggregator Rotten Tomatoes, the film holds an approval rating of 83% based on 29 reviews, with an average rating of 6.5/10. The website's consensus reads, "What Enforcement lacks in character development, this propulsive action thriller makes up with a smart script and relentless tension." Metacritic, which uses a weighted average, assigned the film a score of 64 out of 100, based on 11 critics, indicating "generally favorable" reviews.

Joe Morgenstern found the physical action "more compelling than the superheated plot". Simon Abrams rated the film one and a half stars out of five in his review for RogerEbert.com.
