= Utan svafvel och fosfor =

- Choral work by Richard Strauss
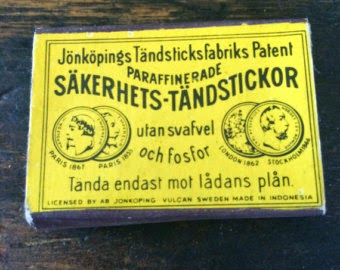
- Swedish matchbox
- English: Without sulfur and phosphorus
- Catalogue: TrV 159 (AV 88).
- Text: Swedish matchbox
- Language: Swedish
- Composed: 7 December 1889
- Scoring: Male voice choir TTBB.

Utan svafvel och fosfor (TrV 159) is an a cappella work for male voice choir, written by Richard Strauss in 1889. It sets the words found on a Swedish matchbox.

== Composition history ==
Strauss had arrived at Weimar as Kapellmeister on September 8, 1889, in the residency of the Grand Dukes of Saxe-Weimar-Eisenach. The Hofkapellmaster (chief music director) was Eduard Lassen (1830-1904), who welcomed the young Strauss and "readily acknowledged his artistic superiority." Strauss finished orchestrating his tone poem Death and Transfiguration soon after his arrival, and on November 11 he premiered his Don Juan.

He spent many of his evenings, mostly in the company of Eduard Lassen, at the Künstlerheim, which he depicted to his father as "a frivolous means of passing the time, with a charming bar in an old smithy". An artists' ball was held there in December, in imitation of the Paris Universal Exhibition, which Richard attended as a blackamoor sweet-seller; it was for this occasion that he composed, on 7 December 1889, his Scherzo-Quartet for male voices on a text he had found on a box of matches made in Sweden: 'Ůtan svafvel och fosfor' (o. Op. 88).

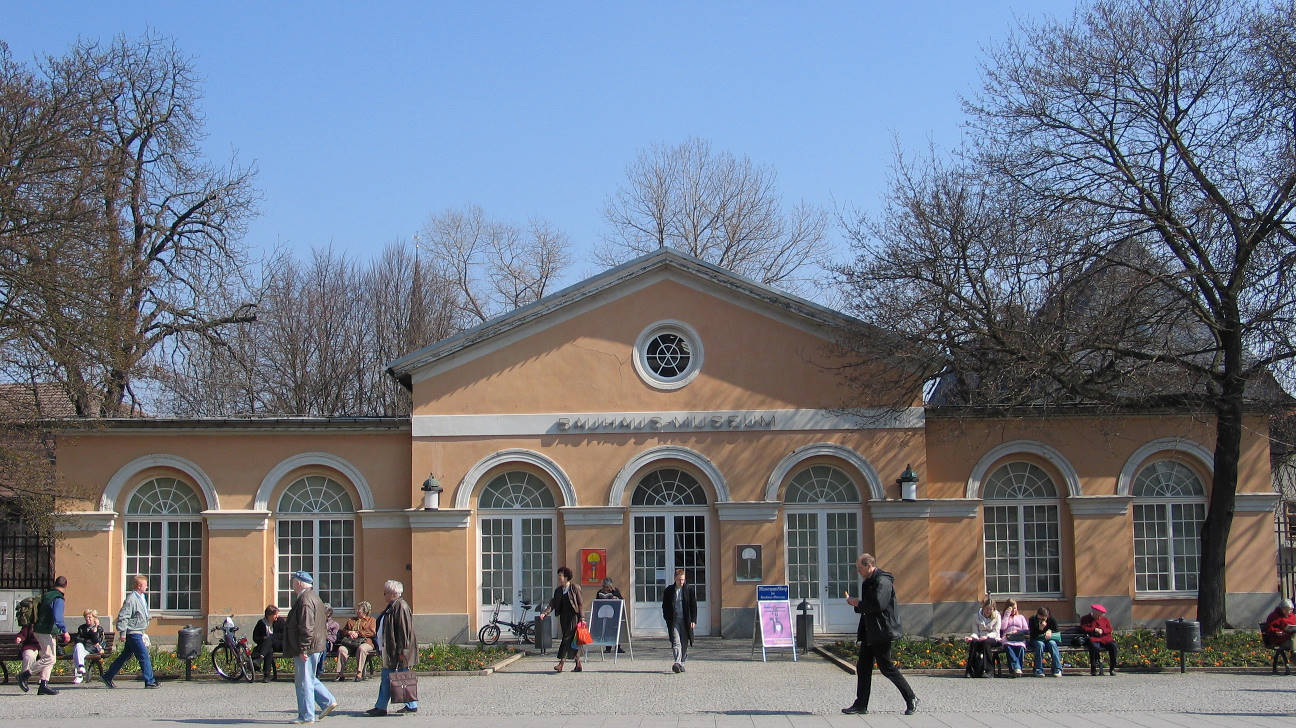
The Künstlerheim (Weimar), currently the Bauhaus-Museum

Later, he wrote of this time at Weimar: "The theatre, cards, as well as my fiancee, claimed most of my attention" (his fiancée being Pauline de Ahna, who had also come to Weimar in October to work at the Court Opera).

The piece is written for two tenor parts and two bass parts and takes a little over 3 minutes to perform. It was written with an alternative German translation of the lyrics, Ohne Schwefel und Phosphor. Strauss did not give the piece an opus number, indicating that he did not think it an important work.

Utan svafvel och fosfor has been recorded by the Berlin radio chorus, with the Swedish lyrics, conducted by Robin Gritton.

== Sources ==
- Kennedy, Michael (1999), Richard Strauss: Man, Musician, Enigma, Cambridge UK: Cambridge University Press. ISBN 0-521-027748 ISBN 978-0521027748
- Schuh, Willi (1982). Richard Strauss: A Chronicle of the Early Years 1864-1898, (translated by Mary Wittal), Cambridge University Press. ISBN 0-521-24104-9.
- Choral score, published in 1992
