= Kristdala =

- Location within Kalmar Location within Sweden
- Coordinates: 57°24′N 16°12′E
- Country: Sweden
- Province: Småland
- County: Kalmar County
- Municipality: Oskarshamn Municipality

Area
  - Total: 1.40 km^{2} (0.54 sq mi)

Population (31 December 2010)
  - Total: 945
  - Density: 673/km^{2} (1,740/sq mi)
- Time zone: UTC+1 (CET)
  - Summer (DST): UTC+2 (CEST)

Kristdala is a locality and a parish situated in Oskarshamn Municipality, Kalmar County, Sweden with 945 inhabitants in 2010.

== History ==
Between 470 and 443 million years ago, a meteor from the Ordovician meteor event struck south-east of present-day Kristdala and created the Hummeln structure where Lake Hummeln is now located.

The first evidence of human settlement dates is a cairn from the Bronze Age (1700 to 500 B.C.E.) now located in Krithems Park. In the park are also round stones typical of a type of tomb from the Iron Age.

Place name researchers believe that the name "Kristdala" comes from Kristusdalen (Christ Valley) or Kristusdalarna (Christ Valleys) and is related to the introduction of Christianity in the 12th century.

== Kristdala Church ==
The medieval wooden Kristdala church was mentioned for the first time in 1358. It was demolished in 1792 and a new stone church was consecrated the same year.

== Kristdala Market ==
Near the spot of Kristdala's first church was a marketplace that developed during the Middle Ages. The market lay at an important intersection, where five roads met, including roads from the coast (Figeholm, Döderhult and Oskarshamn) and from inland (Hultsfred and Vimmerby). Long ago, cattle trading was an important part of the market.

Kristdala market is held twice a year: a summer market on the third Friday in July and a fall market in the fall around Michaelmas (29 September). The summer market is popular with tourists and is visited by approximately 20,000 people a year. Now, instead of cattle, people shop for candy, clothing, and other items.

== Famous people ==
- Dr. Charles W. Roback (b. 1811) - Swedish-American fraudster.
