= As in Heaven (2021 film) =

- Directed by: Tea Lindeburg
- Written by: Tea Lindeburg
- Starring: Flora Ofelia Hofmann Lindahl
- Cinematography: Marcel Zyskind
- Release date: 11 September 2021 (TIFF)
- Running time: 86 min
- Country: Denmark
- Language: Danish

As in Heaven (Danish: Du som er i himlen) is a 2021 Danish drama film written and directed by Tea Lindeburg.

== Plot ==
Set on a rural Danish farm at the turn of the 20th century, the film follows Lise, a teenage girl whose mother goes through a prolonged and life‑threatening childbirth. Over the course of a single day, Lise confronts fear, faith, and the expectations placed upon her as the eldest daughter. The narrative blends realism with dreamlike imagery to reflect her emotional turmoil.

== Production ==
The film is adapted from Marie Bregendahl's 1912 novel En dødsnat. Lindeburg sought to reinterpret the novel through a contemporary cinematic lens, emphasizing subjective experience and the psychological intensity of a single transformative day.

== Release ==
As in Heaven premiered at the 2021 Toronto International Film Festival in the Contemporary World Cinema section.

== Reception ==
The film received widespread critical acclaim.Variety praised its “striking visual language and emotional precision.” The Guardian highlighted Lindahl's performance as “quietly extraordinary.”

== Awards ==
- Silver Shell for Best Director – Tea Lindeburg (San Sebastián International Film Festival)
- Best Leading Performance – Flora Ofelia Hofmann Lindahl (San Sebastián International Film Festival)
- Dragon Award for Best Nordic Film – 2022 Gothenburg Film Festival
