= Felix Körling =

Swedish composer, church musician and music teacher

- Birth name: John Felix August Körling
- Born: 17 December 1864; Kristdala, Sweden
- Died: 8 January 1937 (aged 72); Halmstad, Sweden
- Genres: church music, children's songs
- Occupation(s): Musician, lyricist, composer, music teacher

John Felix August Körling (born 17 December 1864, Kristdala — died 8 January 1937, Halmstad) was a Swedish composer, church musician and music teacher. He was the son of August Körling and the father of American photographer Torkel Korling.

Körling wrote operettas (Guldgruvan, Sommarflirt, Rubber, and Jockeyen), stage music, and folk songs. Today he is best known for being a highly regarded composer of children's songs.
