= Alberte Winding =

Danish singer and actress (born 1963)

Alberte Winding (Alberte)
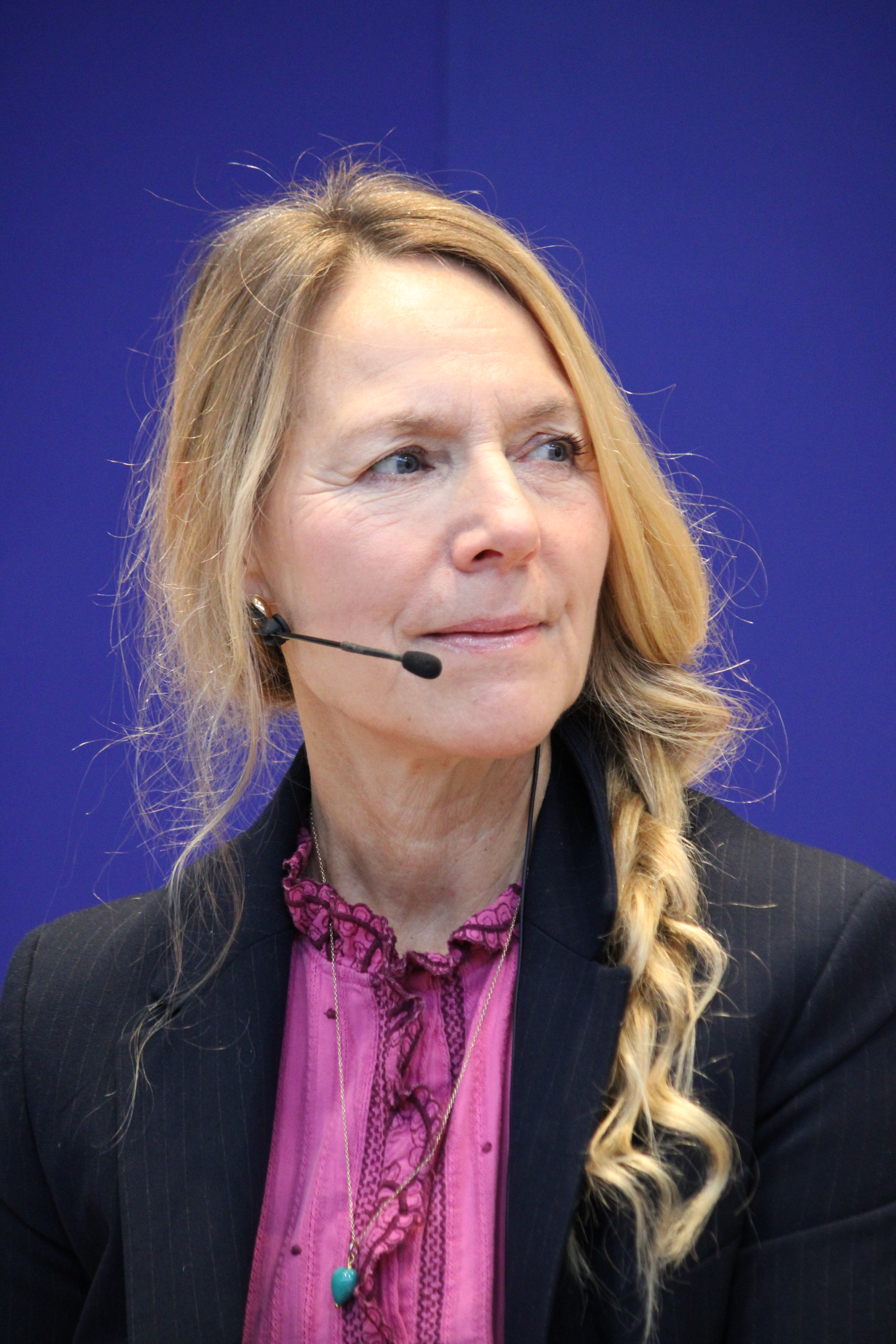
- Winding in 2025

Background information
- Also known as: Alberte
- Born: Elin Alberte Leonora Winding; 23 August 1963 (age 62); Lyngby, Denmark
- Occupation: Singer

Elin Alberte Leonora Winding (born 23 August 1963), commonly known as Alberte, is a Danish singer, songwriter, and actress. She is the daughter of writer Thomas Winding and journalist Lulu Gauguin. She grew up in Copenhagen and on the island of Ærø. She worked together with her brothers Kasper Winding and Aske Bentzon on their father's programs for Denmark Radio.

Alberte is well known for her appearance as Luna in several episodes of the Danish children's television show Bamses billedbog. She also played Lis in the film Strømer and has acted in several plays. Winding was married to musician Jan Rørdam for nearly 20 years, and made and played much of her music with him. They divorced in 2001.

The world-famous painter Paul Gauguin is her great-grandfather.

== Discography ==
=== Albums ===
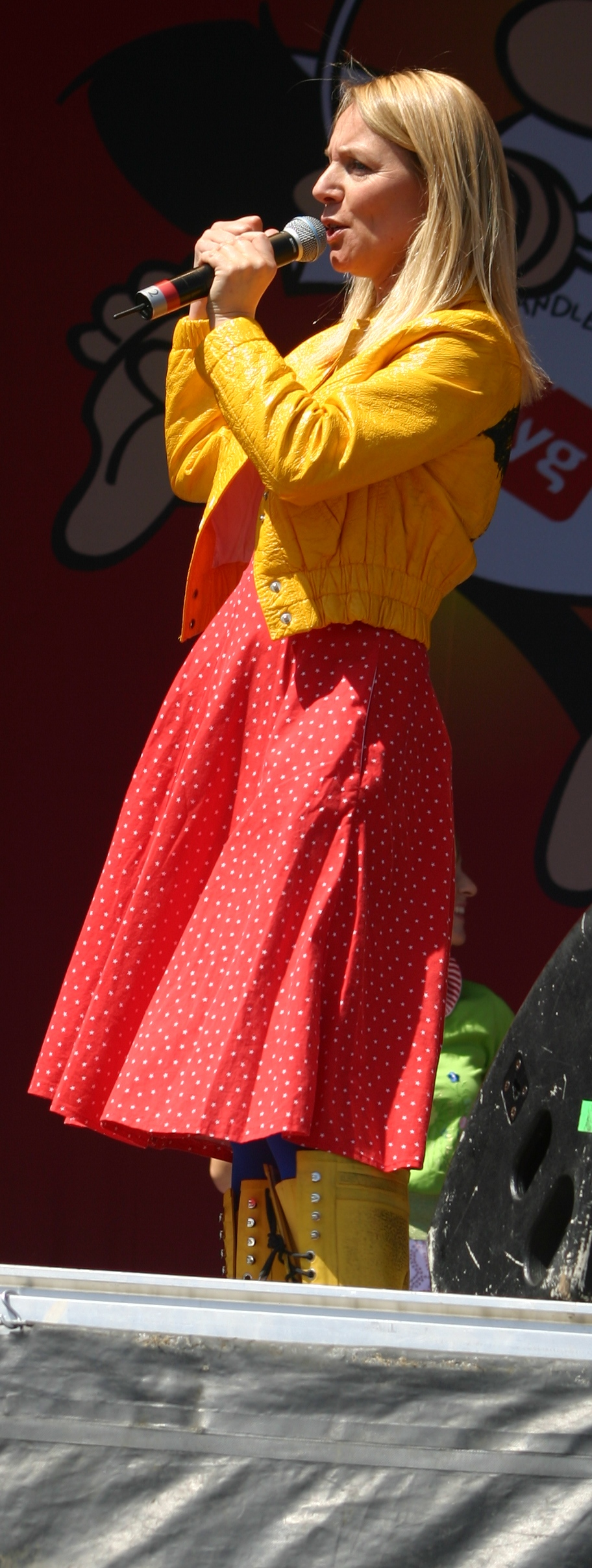
Winding performing in Aarhus, 2006

- 1985: Alberte
- 1986: Lige På
- 1991: Lyse Nætter
- 1992: Det Skaldede Spøgelse
- 1993: Den Forsvundne Skat
- 1994: Tju Bang Chokolademand
- 1996: Alle Verdens Hjørner
- 1999: Brænder Sol
- 1999: De Største & De Mindste
- 2002: Alberte Winding/Benjamin Koppel (jointly with Benjamin Koppel)
- 2003: Svenske Spor (credited as Alberte)
- 2005: Sludder og Vrøvl Gamle Jas (with Thomas Winding & Jan Rørdam)
- 2008: Frostmorgen (with Benjamin Koppel)
- 2011: Fjerde til venstre
- 2012: Ønskescenariet
- 2015: Kommer hjem
- 2017: Hva drømmer du
- 2020: Martha's Vineyard

=== Compilation albums ===
- 1999: Grænseløs Greatest
- 2011: Albertes Bedste Børnesange (credited as Alberte)

=== Singles ===
Featured in

- 2011: "Min Klub Først" (Rosa Lux feat. Alberte) (#1 in Danish Singles Chart)
