= Trine Dyrholm =

Danish actress, singer and songwriter

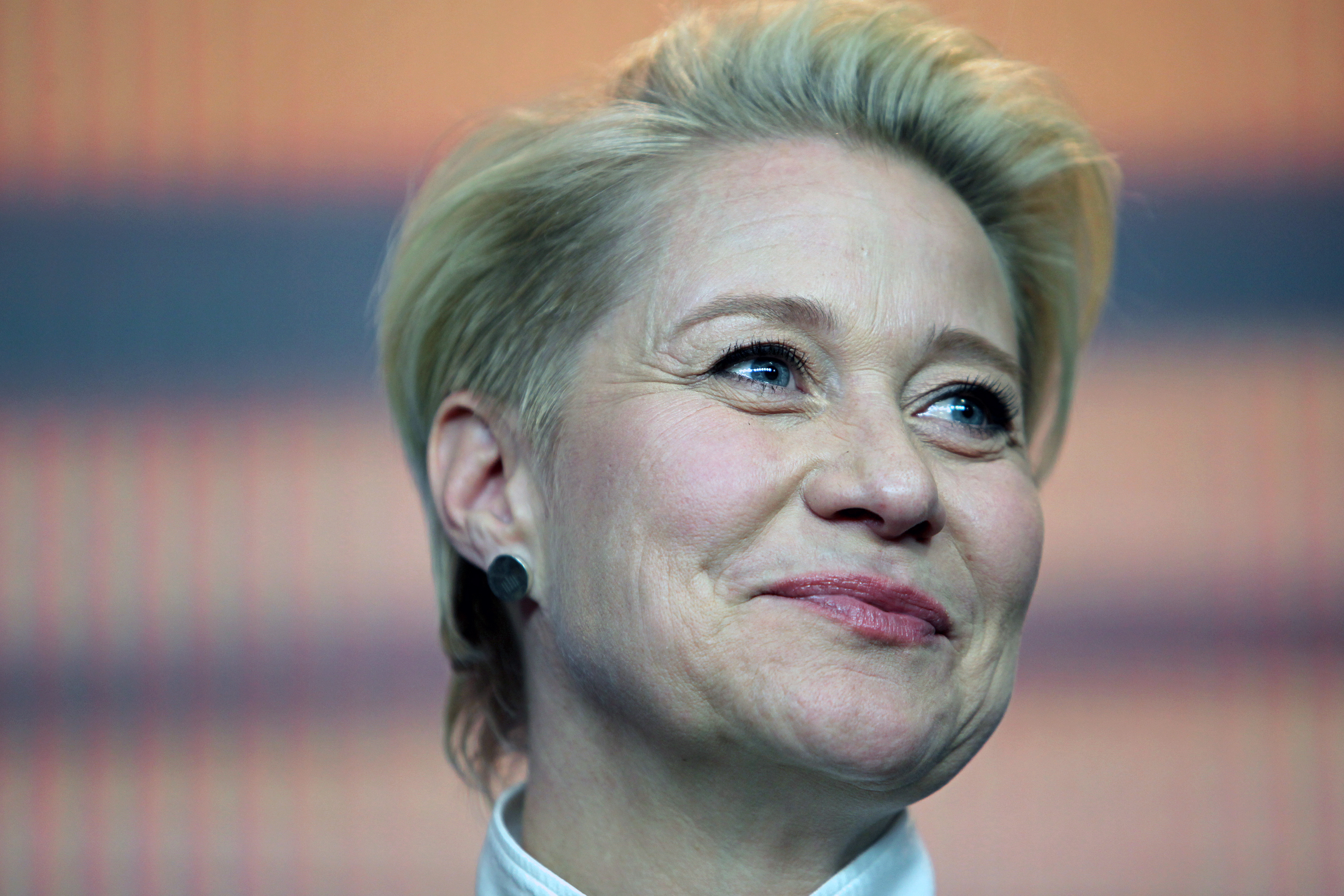
- Trine Dyrholm at the 66th Berlin International Film Festival in 2016
- Born: 15 April 1972 (age 54); Odense, Denmark
- Occupations: Actress, singer, songwriter
- Years active: 1982–present
- Spouse: Niclas Bendixen
- Children: 1

Trine Dyrholm (Danish: [ˈtsʰʁiːnə ˈtyˀɐ̯ˌhʌlˀm] born 15 April 1972 ) is a Danish actress, singer and songwriter. Dyrholm received national recognition when she placed third in the Dansk Melodi Grand Prix as a 14-year-old singer. Four years later, she again achieved national recognition when she won the Bodil Award for Best Actress in her debut film: the teenage romance Springflod. Dyrholm has won the Bodil Award for Best Actress five times and a Bodil award for Best Supporting Actress twice as well as six Robert Awards in her acting career.

== Early life and education ==
Trine Dyrholm was born in Odense, Denmark.

When she was eight years old, she began performing with the Odense orchestra. At the age of 10, she performed in Et juleeventyr (A Christmas Carol) at the Odense Teater and in summer stock in The Funen Village.

In 1987, at 14 years old, Dyrholm made her breakthrough as the lead singer in Trine & The Moonlighters when the group placed third in the Danish Melodi Grand Prix with the song Danse i måneskin (Dancing in Moonlight). After her Grand Prix success, Dyrholm recorded a CD of her own songs.

Dyrholm attended the Statens Teaterskole (Danish National School of Theatre) from 1991 to 1995.

== Career ==
Dyrholm being interviewed by Nordisk Film along with Flora Ofelia, about their work on the 2024 film Birthday Girl

In 1995, she debuted in En skærsommernatsdrøm at Grønnegårds Teatret. Dyrholm earned national recognition with her screen debut in the 1990 teenage romance Springflod for which she received the 1991 Bodil Award for Best Actress. That same year, she earned glowing reviews for her role in the TV production of Hosekrammeren.

She appeared in Morten Lorentzen's films Casanova (1990) and Cecilie (1991), and then Thomas Vinterberg's De største helte (The Greatest Heroes) in 1996. In 1998, Dyrholm played the role of the hotel maid in the first Dogme 95 film, Festen (The Celebration).

In 2004, Dyrholm played the role of Kate in Kim Fupz Aakeson's drama Forbrydelser (In Your Hands) for which she won both the Robert Award for Best Actress in a Leading Role, as well as a Bodil Award. In 2005, Dyrholm again received the Bodil for her leading role in the thriller Fluerne på væggen (Flies on the Wall). The following year, Dyrholm again won both Robert and Bodil Awards for the quirky satire En Soap. In 2007, Trine Dyrholm was again nominated for both the Bodil and Robert awards for her supporting role in Simon Staho's film Daisy Diamond.

Trine Dyrholm in 2026

She sang songs for the comedy show Mr. Nice Guy. Three songs from Mr. Nice Guy, with lyrics by Peter Lund Madsen and Anders Lund Madsen and music by Kim Larsen, were released as an EP entitled Mr. Nice Guy. The EP was number one on the Danish music charts for a total of 62 weeks. It stayed in the Top 20 from 17 December 2004 until 2 November 2007, more than 136 weeks on the charts.

In 2011, Dyrholm won the Bodil Award for Best Actress for her performance in the thriller Hævnen which received the Best Foreign Language Film at the 83rd Academy Awards.

In 2014 she was selected as a member of the jury for the 64th Berlin International Film Festival.

She has appeared in both series of Arvingerne (The Legacy), in which she plays the character of Gro Grønnegaard. The series was sold internationally, to over 40 countries, and won several awards in Denmark. Dyrholm won the Robert Award for Best Actress for her role in series 2.

== Personal life ==
As of 2009, Dyrholm was in a domestic relationship with the actor and choreographer Niclas Bendixen. The couple have one son. In 2024 it was reported that they were husband and wife (date of marriage unknown).

== Filmography and awards ==
Year	Danish title	International title	Role	Notes
2026	Hjem	Home	Lene	
2025	Det andet offer	Second Victims	Camilla	
2024		Poison	Edith	
2024	Pigen med nålen	The Girl with the Needle	Dagmar	
2023		Birthday Girl	Nanna	
2022		The Almond and the Seahorse	Gwen	
2021	Margrete den første	Margrete: Queen of the North	Margaret I of Denmark	
2020	Erna i krig	Erna at War	Erna	Nominated—Bodil Award for Best Actress; Nominated—Robert Award for Best Actress in a Leading Role
2019	Dronningen	Queen of Hearts	Anne	Bodil Award for Best Actress; Robert Award for Best Actress in a Leading Role; Nominated—European Film Award for Best Actress
2019	Brecht	Brecht	Ruth Berlau	
2018	X&Y	X&Y	Trine	
2018	Endzeit	Ever After	Gärtnerin	
2018	Unge Astrid	Becoming Astrid	Foster mother	
2017		Nico, 1988	Nico	
2017	Du forsvinder	You Disappear	Mia	
2016	Kollektivet	The Commune	Anna	Berlin Film Festival Award for Best Actress; Robert Award for Best Actress in a Leading Role; Nominated—European Film Award for Best Actress
2015	Lang historie kort	Long Story Short	Anette	
2014		Who Am I	Hanne Lindberg	
2014		The Cut	Orphanage Headmistress	
2014	En du elsker	Someone You Love	Molly Moe	
2013		3096 Days	Natascha's Mother	
2013	Skytten	The Shooter	Mia Moesgaard	
2012	Den Skaldede Frisør	Love is All You Need	Ida	
2012	En Kongelig Affære	A Royal Affair	Juliane Marie	
2011	Værelse 304	Room 304	Helene	
2010	Hævnen	In a Better World	Marianne	Bodil Award for Best Actress in a Leading Role; Robert Award for Best Actress in a Leading Role
2008	Disco ormene	Sunshine Barry & the Disco Worms	Gloria	(voice)
2008	Lille soldat	Little soldier	Lotte	
2008	De Usynlige	Troubled Water	Agnes	
2008	Dansen	Everybody's Dancing	Annika	
2007	Daisy Diamond	Daisy Diamond	Director of animation film	Nominated—Bodil Award for Best Actress in a Supporting Role; Nominated—Robert Award for Best Actress in a Supporting Role
2007	Fremkaldt	Fremkaldt	Rikke	
2006	Offscreen	Offscreen	herself	Nominated—Robert Award for Best Actress in a Supporting Role
2006	Happy Feet	Happy Feet	voice	Voice actor, Danish version
2006	Der var engang en dreng	Skymaster, a flying family fairytale	Pancake Lady	
2006	Istedgade	Istedgade	Sofie	
2006	Sophie	Sophie	Sophie	
2006	En Soap	A Soap	Charlotte	Bodil Award for Best Actress in a Leading Role; Robert Award for Best Actress in a Leading Role
2005	Robotter	Robots	voice	Voice actor, Danish version
2005	Fluerne på væggen	Flies on the wall	My Larsen	Bodil Award for Best Actress in a Leading Role
2005	Den store dag	The Big Day	Signe	
2005	H.C. Andersens eventyr	The Fairytaler	Additional Voices	TV (5 episodes, 2005)
2004	Forbrydelser	In Your Hands	Kate	Bodil Award for Best Actress in a Supporting Role; Robert Award for Best Actress in a Supporting Role
2003	Tvilling	Gemini	Julie	
2003	Afgrunden	The Tenth Muse	Siv	
2002	Okay	Okay	Trisse	
2002	Bungalow	Bungalow	Lene	
2001	P.O.V. - Point of View	POV	Kamilla	
2001	Line Knutzon's Torben Toben	Torben Toben	Agga	Television
2000	Edderkoppen	The Spider	Topsy	TV miniseries
1999	I Kina spiser de hunde	In China They Eat Dogs	Hanne	
1999	Taxa	Taxi	Stine Jensen	Television (35 episodes, 1997–1999)
1999	Indien	India	April	
1998	Festen	The Celebration	Pia	
1998	Kys, kærlighed og kroner	Regular Thing	Katja	
1997	Herkules	Hercules	Meg	Voice actor, Danish version
1996	De Største helte	The Biggest Heroes	Pernille	
1996	Skyernes skygge rammer mig	Shadow of the Clouds	Lis	
1991	Cecilia	Cecilia	Cecilia	Television
1990	Casanova	Casanova	Gurli	
1990	Springflod	Springflod	Pauline	Bodil Award for Best Actress in a Leading Role

=== TV series ===
Year	Danish title	Role	Notes
1996	Madsen & Co.	Mette	
1997	TAXA	Stine Jensen	
2000	Edderkoppen	Topsy	
2001	Langt fra Las Vegas	Birla	
2014-2017	Arvingerne (The Legacy)	Gro Grønnegaard	Robert Award for Best Actress in a Leading Television Role (s2, 2016); nominated for the same award for s3, 2018
2019	De visionære	Stine Branderup	
2019, 2021	Forhøret (Face to Face)	Susanne Egholm	
2024	Mary & George	Anne of Denmark	
2026	Den Danske Kvinde (The Danish Woman)	Ditte Jensen	

== Discography ==
- 1987: Danse i Måneskin, Eldorado Records
- 1988: Blå & Hvide Striber, (with Rock-Nalle), Banzai Records
- 1988: Et Frossent Ojeblik, It's Magic
- 2004: Mr. Nice Guy
- 2005: Den Store Day
