= List of Danish films of the 2010s =

The following table is a list of films produced in Denmark or in the Danish language during the 2010s (decade). For an alphabetical list of all Danish films currently on wikipedia see Category:Danish films. For Danish films from other decades see the Cinema of Denmark box above.

Danish Title	English Title	Director(s)	Cast	Genre	Notes
2010
Hævnen	In a Better World	Susanne Bier	Mikael Persbrandt, Trine Dyrholm, Ulrich Thomsen	Drama	Academy Award for Best Foreign Film
R	R	Michael Noer og Tobias Lindholm	Pilou Asbæk	Prison film	Premiered at the 2010 IFFR; Bodil Award for Best Danish Film
Klovn The Movie	Clown	Mikkel Nørgaard	Frank Hvam, Casper Christensen	Comedy	
Karla og Jonas	Karla and Jonas	Charlotte Sachs Bostrup	Nicolaj Kopernikus, Ellen Hillingsø	Comedy drama	
Kvinden der drømte om en mand	The Woman That Dreamed About a Man	Per Fly	Sonja Richter, Marcin Dorociński, Mikael Nyqvist	Drama	
Smukke mennesker	Nothing's All Bad	Mikkel Munch-Fals	Bodil Jørgensen, Henrik Prip	Drana	
2011
Skyskraber	Skyscraper	Rune Schjøtt			
Superclásico	SuperClásico	Ole Christian Madsen			
2012
Jagten	The Hunt	Thomas Vinterberg	Mads Mikkelsen	drama	
Kapringen	A Hijacking	Tobias Lindholm			
En kongelig affære	A Royal Affair	Nikolaj Arcel	Mads Mikkelsen		
Den skaldede frisør	Love Is All You Need	Susanne Bier	Pierce Brosnan		
2013
Antboy	Antboy	Ask Hasselbalch			
Kvinden i buret	The Keeper of Lost Causes	Mikkel Norgaard	Nikolaj Lie Kaas, Fares Fares, Sonja Richter	Crime thriller	
Nymphomaniac	Nymphomaniac	Lars von Trier	Charlotte Gainsbourg	art film	
Only God Forgives	Only God Forgives	Nicolas Winding Refn	Ryan Gosling		
2014
Fasandræberne	The Absent One	Mikkel Norgaard	Nikolaj Lie Kaas, Fares Fares, Pilou Asbæk		
En chance til	A Second Chance	Susanne Bier	Nikolaj Coster-Waldau, Nikolaj Lie Kaas, Ulrich Thomsen		
Stille hjerte	Silent Heart	Bille August	Ghita Norby, Morten Grunwald, Paprika Steen	Drama	
2015
Det han gjorde	What He Did	Jonas Poher Rasmussen		Documentary	
Krigen	A War	Tobias Lindholm	Pilou Asbæk, Søren Malling		
Mænd & høns	Men & Chicken	Anders Thomas Jensen	David Dencik, Mads Mikkelsen		
Under sandet	Land of Mine	Martin Zandvliet	Roland Møller, Louis Hofmann		
Skammerens datter	The Shamer's Daughter	Kenneth Kainz	Rebecca Emilie Satrup, Peter Plaugborg		
2016
Flaskepost fra P	A Conspiracy of Faith	Hans Petter Moland	Nikolaj Lie Kaas, Fares Fares		
2017
Underverden	Underverden	Fenar Ahmad	Dar Salim	Thriller	
2018
Den skyldige	The Guilty	Gustav Möller	Jakob Cedergren		
Ternet Ninja	Checkered Ninja	Thorbjørn Christoffersen Anders Matthesen	Alfred Bjerre Larsen, Anders Matthesen		
2019
Dronningen	Queen of Hearts	May el-Toukhy	Trine Dyrholm		
