= Bodil Award for Best Cinematographer =

Danish film awards

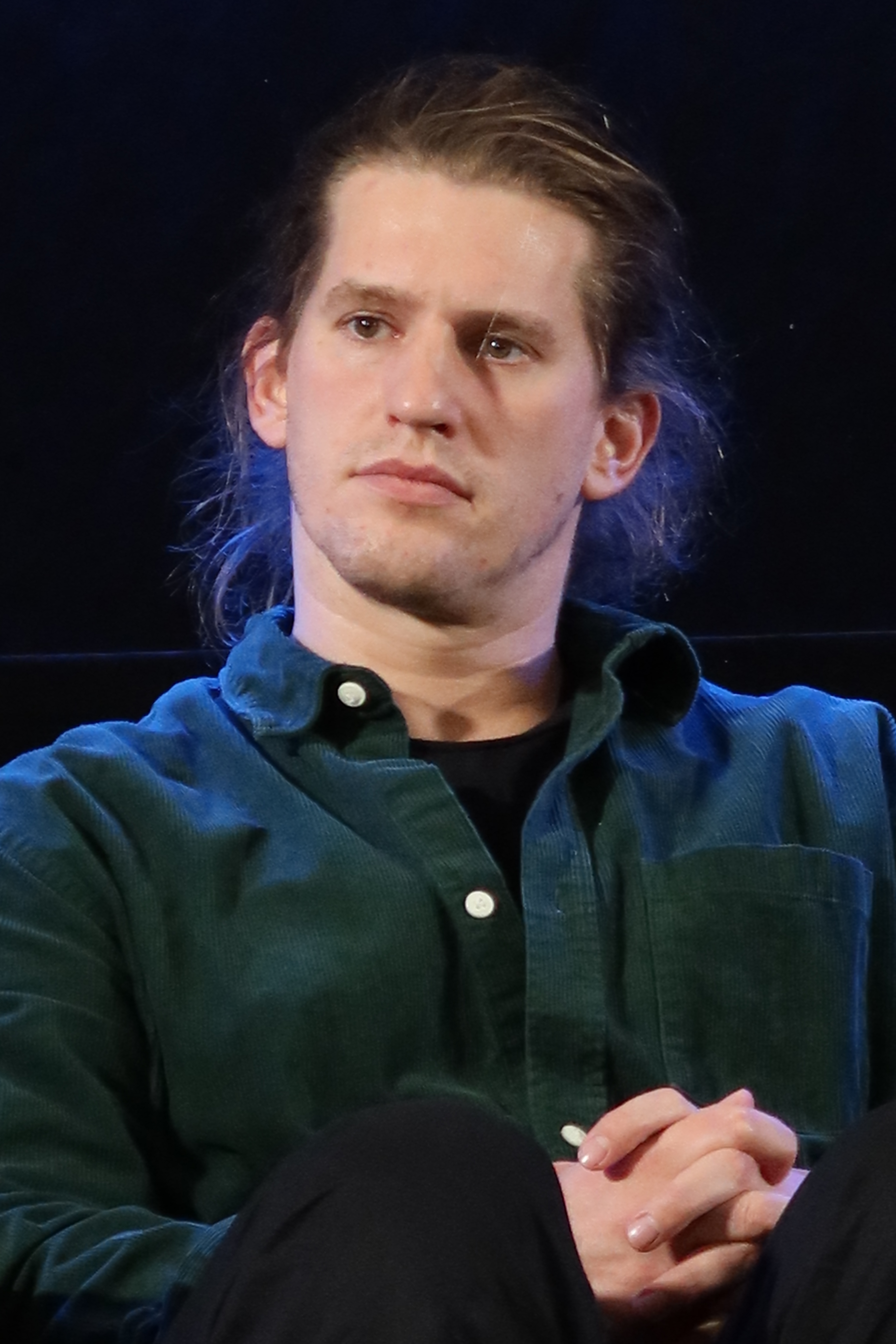
- The 2026 recipient: Michał Dymek
- Country: Denmark
- Presented by: Danish Film Critics Association
- First award: 2006
- Currently held by: Michał Dymek for The Girl with the Needle (2026)
- Website: bodilprisen.dk

The Bodil Award for Best Cinematographer (Danish: Bodilpris for bedste fotograf) is one of the special awards at the annual Danish Bodil Awards presented by the Danish Film Critics Association. First awarded in 2006, the Danish Film Critics Association has rewarded cinematographer from as early as 1949.

== History ==
When the Bodil Awards started out in 1948, it only had seven categories: Best Danish Film, Best Leading Actress, Best Leading Actor, Best Supporting Actress, Best Supporting Actor, Best European Film, and Best American Film. Already at the 2nd Bodil Awards in 1949, the limitations of the seven categories became apparent, and the Bodil Honorary Award was instigated. And it was not at first handed out as a lifetime achievement award, it was given to Annelise Reenberg, Denmark's first female cinematographer, specifically for her shooting of Kristinus Bergman (1948).

Between 1953 and 1983, the Honorary Award was on 10 further occasions given to cinematographers, eight times as awards for shooting specific films and twice as lifetime achievement awards: in 1953 to Kjeld Arnholtz for shooting The Crime of Tove Andersen, in 1960 to Henning Bendtsen for shooting Paw (1959), in 1964 to Henning Kristiansen for shooting Hvad med os? (1963) and School for Suicide (1964), in 1971 to Henning Camre for shooting Giv Gud en chance om søndagen, in 1972 to Carsten Behrendt-Poulsen for shooting Lenin, You Rascal, You (1972), in 1976 and in 1977 as lifetime achievement awards to Mikael Salomon and Dirk Brüel respectively, in 1978 to Alexander Gruszynski for shooting the documentary Jenny (1977), in 1982 to Dan Laustsen for shooting Rubber Tarzan (1981), and in 1983 to Jan Weincke for shooting Tree of Knowledge (1981) and Zappa (1983).

From 2000 to 2005 (barring 2003), an external, named cinematographer prize without a Bodil statuette was awarded under three different names: Johan Ankerstjernes Fotografpris (Johan Ankerstjerne's Cinematographer Award) (2000–2002) named after Johan Ankerstjerne, Kodak og Nordisk Postproductions Fotografpris (Kodak and Nordic Postproduction's Cinematographer Award) in 2004, and Nordisk Film Lab og Kodaks Fotografpris (Nordic Film Lab and Kodak Cinematographer Award) in 2005.

- 2000: Dirk Brüel for The Magnetist's Fifth Winter – as Johan Ankerstjernes Fotografpris
- 2001: Eric Kress for A Place Nearby – as Johan Ankerstjernes Fotografpris
- 2002: Dan Laustsen – as Johan Ankerstjernes Fotografpris
- 2003: No award given
- 2004: Anthony Dod Mantle – as Kodak og Nordisk Postproductions Fotografpris
- 2005: Morten Søborg – as Nordisk Film Lab og Kodaks Fotografpris

Since 2006, the Bodil Award for Best Cinematographer has been awarded annually as a special award with a Bodil statuette. As such, the award was given for the first time at the 59th Bodil Awards in 2006 to Manuel Alberto Claro.

== Recipients ==
=== 2000s ===
- 2006: Manuel Alberto Claro for Allegro and Dark Horse
- 2007: Jørgen Johansson for Prague
- 2008: Dan Laustsen
- 2009: Jørgen Johansson for Terribly Happy (2008) and Flame & Citron (2008)

=== 2010s ===
- 2010: Anthony Dod Mantle for Antichrist
- 2011: Lars Skree for Armadillo
- 2012: Manuel Alberto Claro for Melancholia
- 2013: Rasmus Videbæk for A Royal Affair
- 2014: Charlotte Bruus Christensen for The Hunt
- 2015: Niels Thastum for When Animals Dream
- 2016: Magnus Nordenhof Jønck for Key House Mirror, Bridgend, and A War
- 2017: Maria von Hausswolff for Parents
- 2018: Maria von Hausswolff for Winter Brothers
- 2019: Nadim Carlsen for Holiday

=== 2020s ===
- 2020: Jasper Spanning for Queen of Hearts
- 2021: Louise McLaughlin for The Good Traitor
- 2022: Rasmus Videbæk for Margrete: Queen of the North
- 2023: Maria von Hausswolff for Godland
- 2026: Michał Dymek for The Girl with the Needle

== See also ==
- Robert Award for Best Cinematography
