= 69th Bodil Awards =

2016 Danish film awards ceremony

- Date: 5 March 2016
- Site: Bremen Theatre, Copenhagen
- Hosted by: Troels Lyby
- Organized by: Danish Film Critics Association

Highlights
- Best Film: Land of Mine
- Bodil Honorary Award: Anna Karina
- Best Actor: Roland Møller; Land of Mine
- Best Actress: Mille Lehfeldt; Long story short
- Most awards: Land of Mine (3)
- Most nominations: Sommeren '92 (4)

The 69th Bodil Awards were held on 5 March 2016 in the Bremen Theater in Copenhagen, Denmark, honoring the best national and foreign films of 2015.

On 11 February 2016 it was announced that 75-year-old Danish-French actress Anna Karina would receive the 2016 Bodil Honorary Award as "one of the most iconic" actresses of the French New Wave.

Land of Mine directed by Martin Zandvliet was the big winner at the Awards: It won the Best Danish Film Award, Roland Møller won his first Bodil Award for Best Actor in a Leading Role as Sgt. Carl Rasmussen in the film, while Louis Hofmann took home the statuette for Best Actor in a Supporting Role as a young German POW. Peter Albrechtsen received a special Bodil for sound design in the film The Idealist and Mia Stensgaard won the Henning Bahs Prize for her production design on Mænd og Høns.

== Winners and nominees ==
Winners in bold

=== Best Danish Film ===
- **Land of Mine**

- The Idealist
- Bridgend
- Krigen
- Sommeren '92

=== Best Actor in a Leading Role ===
- **Roland Møller** – Land of Mine
  Joachim Fjelstrup – Steppeulven
  Ulrich Thomsen – Sommeren '92
  Pilou Asbæk – Krigen
  Peter Plaugborg – The Idealist

=== Best Actress in a Leading Role ===
- **Mille Lehfeldt** – Lang historie kort
  Ghita Nørby – Nøgle hus spejl
  Tuva Novotny for Krigen
  Hannah Murray for Bridgend
  Bodil Jørgensen for People Get Eaten

=== Best Actor in a Supporting Role ===
- **Louis Hofmann** – Land of Mine
  Søren Malling – The Idealist
  Henning Jensen – Sommeren '92
  Dulfi al-Jabouri – Krigen
  Esben Smed – Sommeren '92

=== Best Actress in a Supporting Role ===
- **Trine Pallesen** – Nøgle hus spejl
  Trine Dyrholm – Lang historie kort
  Dya Josefine Hauch – Lang historie kort
  Lene Maria Christensen – Sommeren '92
  Ruth Brejnholm – Skyggen af en helt

=== Best American Film ===
- **Birdman**
  Inside Out
  Sicario
  Star Wars: The Force Awakens
  Whiplash

=== Best Non-American Film ===
- **Mommy**

- Leviathan
- Mad Max: Fury Road
- Amy
- Marshland

=== Best Documentary ===
- **The Man Who Saved the World**

- Et hjem i verden
- Misfits
- Fassbinder – at elske uden at kræve
- Naturens uorden

== Recipients ==
=== Bodil Honorary Award ===
- Anna Karina

=== Bodil Special Award ===
- Peter Albrechtsen, Sound editor, for editing The Idealist among other films.

=== Best Cinematography ===
- Magnus Nordenhof Jønck for Nøgle hus spejl, Krigen and Bridgend

=== External awards ===
==== Henning Bahs Award ====
- Mia Stensgaard for Mænd og Høns

==== Danish Writers Guild Best Screenplay Award ====
- May el-Toukhy and Maren Louise Käehne for Lang historie kort

== See also ==
- 2016 Robert Awards
