= Bodil Award for Best Actor in a Leading Role =

Annual Danish film award

The Bodil Award for Best Actor in a Leading Role (Danish: Bodilprisen for bedste mandlige hovedrolle) is one of the merit categories presented annually by the Danish Film Critics Association at the Bodil Awards. Created in 1948, it is one of the oldest film awards in Europe, and it honours the best performance by an actor in a leading role in a Danish produced film. The jury can decide not to hand out the award. This has happened five times, in 1952, 1970, 1976, 1985, and in 1986.

== Honorees ==
=== 1940s ===
- 1948: Poul Reichhardt won for his role as the soldier Robert Olsen in Jenny and the Soldier
- 1949: Mogens Wieth won for his role in Kampen mod uretten

=== 1950s ===
- 1950: Erik Mørk won for his role in Susanne
- 1951: Ib Schønberg won for his role in Café Paradis
- 1952: Not awarded
- 1953: Per Buckhøj won for his role in Adam and Eve
- 1954: Angelo Bruun won for his role in Hendes store aften
- 1955: Emil Hass Christensen won for his role in Ordet
- 1956: Ove Sprogøe won for his role in På tro og love
- 1957: Peter Malberg won for his role in Be Dear to Me
- 1958: Gunnar Lauring won for his role in Krudt og klunker
- 1959: Preben Lerdorff Rye won for his role in En fremmed banker på

=== 1960s ===
- 1960: Kjeld Petersen won for his role in Vi er allesammen tossede
- 1961: Henning Moritzen won for his role in Forelsket i København
- 1962: John Price won for his role in Duellen
- 1963: Jarl Kulle won for his role in Den kære familie
- 1964: Ole Wegener won for his role in Sekstet
- 1965: Morten Grunwald won for his role in Fem mand og Rosa
- 1966: John Price won for his role in Neighbours
- 1967: Per Oscarsson won for his role in Hunger
- 1968: Jesper Langberg won for his role in Sådan er de alle
- 1969: Jesper Klein won for his role in Ballad of Carl-Henning

=== 1970s ===
- 1970: Not awarded
- 1971: Paul Scofield won for his role in King Lear
- 1972: Ove Sprogøe won for his role in The Missing Clerk
- 1973: Ole Ernst won for his role in Flugten
- 1974: Dirch Passer won for his role in Me and the Mafia
- 1975: Ove Sprogøe won for his role in The Last Exploits of the Olsen Gang
- 1976: Not awarded
- 1977: Jens Okking won for his role in Strømer
- 1978: Frits Helmuth won for his role in Lille spejl
- 1979: Jesper Christensen won for his role in Hør, var der ikke en som lo?

=== 1980s ===
- 1980: Allan Olsen won for his role in Johnny Larsen
- 1981: Buster Larsen won for his role in Jeppe på bjerget
- 1982: Otto Brandenburg won for his role in Rubber Tarzan
- 1983: Ole Ernst won for his role in Der er et yndigt land
- 1984: Peter Hesse Overgaard won for his role in Isfugle
- 1985: Not awarded
- 1986: Not awarded
- 1987: Michael Falch won for his role in Mord i mørket
- 1988: Max von Sydow won for his role in Pelle the Conqueror
- 1989: Ole Lemmeke won for his role in Himmel og helvede

=== 1990s ===
- 1990: Frits Helmuth won for his role in Waltzing Regitze
- 1991: Tommy Kenter won for his role in Dance of the Polar Bears
- 1992: Ole Lemmeke won for his role in De nøgne træer
- 1993: Søren Østergaard won for his role in Pain of Love
- 1994: Frits Helmuth won for his role in Stolen Spring
- 1995: Ernst-Hugo Järegård won for his role as Stig Helmer in The Kingdom
- 1996: Ulf Pilgaard won for his role in Farligt venskab
- 1997: Max von Sydow won for his role in Hamsun
- 1998: Holger Juul Hansen won for his role as Einar Moesgaard in Riget II
- 1999: Ulrich Thomsen won for his role in The Celebration

=== 2000s ===
- 2000: Henrik Lykkegaard won for his role as Lars Erik in Bornholms stemme
- 2001: Jesper Christensen won for his role as Kaj in The Bench
  - Jakob Cedergren was nominated for his role as Nick in Submarino
  - Anders W. Berthelsen was nominated for his role as Andreas in Italian for Beginners
  - Peter Gantzler was nominated for his role as Jørgen Mortensen in Italian for Beginners
  - Thure Lindhardt was nominated for his role as Brian in A Place Nearby
  - Søren Pilmark was nominated for his role as Thorkild in Flickering Lights
- 2002: Jens Okking won for his role as Svensson in One-Hand Clapping
  - Lars Mikkelsen was nominated for his role as Mads in Kira's Reason: A Love Story
  - Troels Lyby was nominated for his role in Truly Human
  - Nikolaj Lie Kaas was nominated for his role as P in Truly Human
  - Sven Wollter was nominated for his role as Martin Fischer in A Song for Martin
- 2003: Jens Albinus won for his role as Richard Malmros (as an adult) in Facing the Truth
  - Ole Ernst was nominated for his role as Father in Okay
  - Jørgen Kiil was nominated for his role in Minor Mishaps
  - Mads Mikkelsen was nominated for his role as Niels in Open Hearts
- 2004: Ulrich Thomsen won for his role as Christoffer in The Inheritance
  - Lars Brygmann was nominated for his role in Reconstruction
  - Jakob Cedergren was nominated for his role as Tom in Stealing Rembrandt
  - Mads Mikkelsen was nominated for his role as Svend in The Green Butchers
  - John Turturro was nominated for his role as Harry in Fear X
- 2005: Mads Mikkelsen won for his role as Tonny in Pusher II
  - Anders W. Berthelsen was nominated for his role as Ulrik Torp in King's Game
  - Nikolaj Lie Kaas was nominated for his role as Jannik in Brothers
  - Mikael Persbrandt was nominated for his role as Thomas in Day and Night
  - Ulrich Thomsen was nominated for his role as Michael in Brothers
- 2006: Jesper Christensen won for his role as Carsten in Manslaughter
  - Mikael Persbrandt was nominated for his role as Åke in Bang Bang Orangutang
  - Troels Lyby was nominated for his role as Henrik in Accused
  - Thure Lindhardt was nominated for his role as Steso in Nordkraft
  - Bjarne Henriksen was nominated for his role as Keld in Kinamand
- 2007: Nicolas Bro won for his role as in Offscreen
  - David Dencik was nominated for his role as Veronica in A Soap
  - Rolf Lassgård was nominated for his role as Jørgen Lennart Hansson in After the Wedding
  - Mads Mikkelsen was nominated for his role as Christoffer in Prague
  - Janus Dissing Rathke was nominated for his role as Frits Johansen in We Shall Overcome
- 2008: Jesper Asholt won for his role as Father in The Art of Crying
  - Kim Bodnia was nominated for his role as Simon in Echo
  - Lars Brygmann was nominated for his role as Ulrich Nymann in White Night
  - David Dencik was nominated for his role as Shmuli in Outside Love
  - Thure Lindhardt was nominated for his role as Tosse Uffe in Pistoleros
- 2009: Jakob Cedergren won for his role as Robert Hansen in Terribly Happy
  - Henning Jensen was nominated for his role as Mogens in Gaven
  - Thure Lindhardt was nominated for his role as Bent Faurschou Hviid in Flame & Citron
  - Dar Salim was nominated for his role as Jamil in Go With Peace, Jamil
  - Ulrich Thomsen was nominated for his role as Mikael in Fear Me Not

=== 2010s ===
- 2010: Willem Dafoe won for his role as "He" in Amtichrist
  - Kristian Halken was nominated for his role as Vagn Bendtsen in Oldboys
  - Cyron Melville was nominated for his role as Pierre Duret in Love and Rage
  - Nikolaj Coster-Waldau was nominated for his role as Claes Greve in Headhunters
- 2011: Pilou Asbæk won for his role as R in R
  - Jakob Cedergren was nominated for his role as Nick in Submarino
  - David Dencik was nominated for his role as Jimmy in Brotherhood
  - Mikael Persbrandt was nominated for his role as Anton in In a Better World
  - Peter Plaugborg was nominated for his role as Nick's brother in Submarino
- 2012: Nikolaj Lie Kaas won for his role as Dirch Passer in A Funny Man
  - Jesper Christensen was nominated for his role as Rikard Rheinwald in A Family
  - Anders W. Berthelsen was nominated for his role as Christian in SuperClásico
- 2013: Mikkel Boe Følsgaard won for his role as Christian VII in A Royal Affair
  - Mads Mikkelsen was nominated for his role as Johann Friedrich Struensee in A Royal Affair
  - Søren Malling was nominated for his role as Peter C. Ludvigsen in A Hijacking
  - Pilou Asbæk was nominated for his role as Mikkel Hartmann in A Hijacking
  - Lars Mikkelsen was nominated for his role as Per in A Caretaker's Tale
- 2014: Mads Mikkelsen won for his role as Lucas in The Hunt
  - Gustav Dyekjær Giese was nominated for his role in Nordvest
  - Jakob Cedergren was nominated for his role in Sorrow and Joy
  - Nicolas Bro was nominated for his role as Mogens Glistrup in Spies & Glistrup
  - Stellan Skarsgård was nominated for his role as Seligman in Nymphomaniac
- 2015: Henrik Birch won for his role as Kristian in Klumpfisken
  - Mikael Persbrandt was nominated for his role as Thomas Jacob in Someone You Love
  - Villads Boye was nominated for his role as Martin in Speed Walking
  - Uffe Rørbæk was nominated for his role in The Other Life
- 2016: Roland Møller won for his role as Sergeant Carl Leopold Rasmussen in Land of Mine
  - Joachim Fjelstrup was nominated for his role as Eik Skaløe in Itsi Bitsi
  - Ulrich Thomsen was nominated for his role as Richard Møller Nielsen in Sommeren '92
  - Pilou Asbæk was nominated for his role as Claus Michael Petersen in A War
  - Peter Plaugborg was nominated for his role as Poul Brink in The Idealist
- 2017: Søren Malling won for his role in Parents
  - David Dencik was nominated for his role as Arne Itkin in Fuglene over sundet
  - Mikkel Boe Følsgaard was nominated for his role as Thomas in Walk with Me
  - Martin Buch was nominated for his role in Swinger
  - Ulrich Thomsen was nominated for his role as Erik in The Commune
- 2018: Dejan Cukic won for his role in Fantasten
- 2019: Jakob Cedergren won for his role as Asger Holm in The Guilty

=== 2020s ===
- 2020: Jesper Christensen won for his role in Before the Frost
- 2021: Mads Mikkelsen won for his role in Another Round
- 2022: Anders Matthesen for his role in Checkered Ninja 2
- 2023: Elliott Crosset Hove for his role in Godland
- 2024: Mads Mikkelsen for his role in The Promised Land

== See also ==
- Robert Award for Best Actor in a Leading Role
