= 64th Bodil Awards =

2011 Danish film awards ceremony

- Date: 20 February 2011
- Site: Bremen Theater, Copenhagen
- Hosted by: Ditte Hansen and Louise Mieritz

Highlights
- Best Film: R
- Best Actor: Pilou Asbæk; R
- Best Actress: Trine Dyrholm; In a Better World
- Most awards: R and Armadillo (2)
- Most nominations: Submarino (5)

The 64th Bodil Awards were held on 20 February 2011 at the Bremen Theater in Copenhagen, Denmark, honouring the best national and foreign films of 2010. Ditte Hansen and Louise Mieritz hosted the event. Submarino had most nominations, with five, but the ceremony did not have a clear winner. R won the award for Best Danish Film and its protagonist, Pilou Asbæk, won the award for Best Actor while Trine Dyrholm was named Best Actress (In a Better World). Kurt Ravn (Nothing's All Bad) and Patricia Schumann (Submarino) won the awards for Best Supporting Actor and Actress. Armadillo won both the awards for Best Documentary and Best Cinematographer. Tobias Lindholm received a Special Award for his contribution as a screenwriter both to R and Submarino. Henning Moritzen was given a Bodil Honorary Award for his contribution to Danish film.

== Winners ==
=== Best Danish Film ===
- R
  - Clown
  - In a Better World
  - Submarino
  - Truth About Men

=== Best Actor in a Leading Role ===
Pilou Asbæk – R

- Jakob Cedergren – Submarino
- David Dencik – Brotherhood
- Mikael Persbrandt – In a Better World
- Peter Plauborg – Submarino

=== Best Actress in a Leading Role ===
Trine Dyrholm – In a Better World

- Julie Brochorst Andersen – Hold Me Tight
- Ellen Hillingsø – The Experiment
- Bodil Jørgensen – Smukke mennesker
- Mille Hoffmeyer Lehfeldt – Nothing's All Bad

=== Best Actor in a Supporting Role ===
Kurt Ravn – Nothing's All Bad

- Kim Bodnia – In a Better World
- Morten Holst – Brotherhood
- Gustav Fischer Kjærulff – Submarino
- Roland Møller – R

=== Best Actress in a Supporting Role ===
Patricia Schumann Submarino

- Marijana Jankovic – Everything Will Be Fine
- Laura Skaarup Jensen – The Experiment
- Rosalinde Mynster – Truth About Men
- Paprika Steen – Everything Will Be Fine

=== Best American Film ===
A Single Man (Inst: Tom Ford)

- Inception
- Somewhere
- The Kids Are All Right
- The Social Network

=== Best Non-American Film ===
The White Ribbon

- An Education
- Biutiful
- Fish Tank
- A Prophet

=== Best Cinematographer ===
Lars Skree – Armadillo Bedste dokumentarfilm Armadillo

=== Bodil Special Award ===
Tobias Lindholm for R and Submarino

=== Bodil Honorary Award ===
Henning Moritzen

== See also ==
- 2011 Robert Awards
