= 66th Bodil Awards =

2013 Danish film awards ceremony

- Date: 16 March 2013
- Site: Bremen Theatre, Copenhagen
- Hosted by: Mikael Bertelsen

Highlights
- Best Film: Melancholia
- Best Actor: Mikkel Boe Følsgaard; A Royal Affair
- Best Actress: Sara Hjort; Undskyld jeg forstyrrer
- Most nominations: A Royal Affair (5)

The 66th Bodil Awards were held on 16 March 2013 in the Bremen Theater in Copenhagen, Denmark, honouring the best national and foreign films of 2012. A Hijacking won the award for Best Danish Film. Generally the awards were distributed among many films this year.

Bent Fabricius-Bjerre received a Bodil Honorary Award for his work in film music, scoring more than 100 films throughout his career.

== Winners ==
=== Best Danish Film ===
- A Hijacking
  - Undskyld jeg forstyrrer
  - Teddy Bear
  - A Royal Affair
  - You and Me Forever

=== Best Documentary ===
- Putin's Kiss
  - Ballerina
  - White Black Boy
  - Lej en familie A/S
  - Kidd Life

=== Best Actor in a Leading Role ===
- Mikkel Boe Følsgaard – A Royal Affair
  - Mads Mikkelsen – A Royal Affair
  - Søren Malling – A Hijacking
  - Pilou Asbæk – A Hijacking
  - Lars Mikkelsen – A Caretaker's Tale

=== Best Actress in a Leading Role ===
- Sara Hjort Ditlevsen – Undskyld jeg forstyrrer
  - Trine Dyrholm – Love Is All You Need
  - Julie Brohorst Andersen – You and Me Forever
  - Alicia Vikander – A Royal Affair
  - Bodil Jørgensen – This Life

=== Best Actor in a Supporting Role ===
- Tommy Kenter – The Passion of Marie
  - Nicolas Bro – Undskyld jeg forstyrrer
  - Roland Møller – A Hijacking
  - Lars Bom – Max Embarrassing 2
  - Thomas W. Gabrielsson – A Royal Affair

=== Best Actress in a Supporting Role ===
- Frederikke Dahl Hansen – You and Me Forever
  - Emilie Claudius Kruse – You and Me Forever
  - Elsebeth Stentoft – Teddy Bear
  - Lotte Andersen – Undskyld jeg forstyrrer
  - Trine Dyrholm – A Royal Affair

=== Best Cinematography ===
- Rasmus Videbæk – A Royal Affair

=== Best American Film ===
- Martha Marcy May Marlene
  - The Descendants
  - Moonrise Kingdom
  - Take Shelter
  - We Need to Talk About Kevin

=== Best Non-American Film ===
- Amour
  - The Artist
  - Shame
  - Searching for Sugar Man
  - Holy Motors

=== Bodil Special Award ===
- The Act of Killing by Joshua Oppenheimer (film distributor, Miracle Film)

=== Bodil Honorary Award ===
- Bent Fabricius-Bjerre

=== Audience Award ===
- This Life

=== Henning Bahs Award ===
- Niels Sejer (scenography) A Royal Affair

== See also ==
- 2013 Robert Awards
