= 67th Bodil Awards =

2014 Danish film awards ceremony

- Date: 1 February 2014
- Site: Bremen Theatre, Copenhagen
- Hosted by: Troels Lyby

Highlights
- Best Film: The Hunt
- Best Actor: Mads Mikkelsen; The Hunt
- Best Actress: Charlotte Gainsbourg; Nymphomaniac
- Most nominations: The Hunt (7)

The 67th Bodil Awards were held on 1 February 2014 in the Bremen Theater in Copenhagen, Denmark, honouring the best national and foreign films of 2013. The Hunt won the award for Best Danish Film.

Jesper Langberg received a Bodil Honorary Award for his outstanding career in Danish films.

== Winners ==
=== Best Danish Film ===
- The Hunt
  - Keeper of Lost Causes
  - Nordvest
  - Nymphomaniac
  - Sorrow and Joy

=== Best Documentary ===
- Ai Weiwei: The Fake Case
  - Blodets bånd
  - Sepideh

=== Best Actor in a Leading Role ===
- Mads Mikkelsen – The Hunt
  - Gustav Dyekær Giese – Nordvest
  - Jacob Cedergren – Sorrow and joy
  - Nicolas Bro – Spies & Glistrup
  - Stellan Skarsgård – Nymphomaniac

=== Best Actress in a Leading Role ===
- Charlotte Gainsbourg – Nymphomaniac
  - Helle Fagralid – Sorrow and joy
  - Sofie Gråbøl – The Hour of the Lynx
  - Stacy Martin – Nymphomaniac

=== Best Actor in a Supporting Role ===
- Roland Møller – Nordvest
  - Fares Fares – Keeper of Lost Causes
  - Jamie Bell – Nymphomaniac
  - Lars Ranthe – The Hunt
  - Thomas Bo Larsen – The Hunt

=== Best Actress in a Supporting Role ===
- Susse Wold – The Hunt
  - Anne Louise Hassing – The Hunt
  - Kristin Scott Thomas – Only God Forgives
  - Sonja Richter – Keeper of Lost Causes
  - Uma Thurman – Nymphomaniac

=== Best Cinematography ===
- Charlotte Bruus Christensen – The Hunt

=== Best American Film ===
- Beasts of the Southern Wild
  - Before Midnight
  - Django Unchained
  - Frances Ha
  - Gravity

=== Best Non-American Film ===
- La Vie d'Adèle – Chapitres 1 & 2
  - De rouille et d'os
  - Paradise trilogy
  - The Broken Circle Breakdown
  - The Great Beauty

=== Bodil Special Award ===
- CPH:DOX

=== Bodil Honorary Award ===
- Jesper Langberg

=== Henning Bahs Award ===
- Rasmus Thjellesen (scenography) – Keeper of Lost Causes

== See also ==
- 2014 Robert Awards
