= Roni Ezra =

Danish film director and screenwriter (b. 1973)

- Born: 19 June 1973 (age 53); Copenhagen, Denmark
- Education: Super 16
- Occupations: Director, screenwriter
- Awards: Edith-Allers grant for up-and-coming artists (2007)

Roni Ezra (born 19 June 1973) is a Danish film director and screenwriter. One of his best-known films is April 9th, which was based on the efforts of a Danish bicycle infantry company to slow the German advance until reinforcements can arrive during the early stage of World War II. The film Helmer & søn, which he wrote, was also nominated for Best Live Action Short Film at the 79th Academy Awards.

== Early life and education ==
Born in 1973 in Copenhagen, Ezra is the son of a Jewish father from Basra, Iraq, and a mother from Nexø, Bornholm, Denmark. His brother Rene Ezra is a film producer. His father wanted him to be a doctor or lawyer, but his exposure of his son to films such as West Side Story, Spartacus, and Rebel Without a Cause led Ezra to pursue a career in the film industry.

After graduating from secondary school, he worked for several years at a video store. He then studied at Super 16 Hold, a film school in Copenhagen, from which he graduated in 2008.

== Career ==
Ezra wrote and directed the short films Instinkt (2006), Marts (2007), and Panser (2008); he also wrote the shorts Helmer & Søn (2006) and Alliancen (2008). He wrote and directed the 2010 TV documentary Veninder på 1. klasse.

In 2015, his first full-length feature film, 9. April (April 9th), was released. It was directed by Ezra, written by Tobias Lindholm, and produced by Rene Ezra and Tobias Radoor. The film follows the brief but valiant military resistance to the Nazi invasion of Denmark on April 9, 1940. According to Ezra, his interest in the subject is rooted on a school excursion to a memorial that commemorates the invasion. One of the lead characters in the film was loosely based on the life of the veteran Anders Justesen, whom Ezra invited during the film's premiere.

Ezra has since directed the feature film Everything's Gonna Be Pink (2015), which was shot in New York, as well as three episodes of the TV series Gidseltagningen and six episodes of the TV series Sygeplejeskolen. Gidseltagningen, also called Below the Surface, is an eight-part Danish hostage action thriller commissioned by Studio Canal. It premiered on Kanal 5 in Denmark and was also aired in the United Kingdom by BBC.

In addition to directing, Ezra has worked on various projects as an actor, second unit director, and assistant director. He has also made commercials, music videos, and documentaries. He is currently affiliated with the Nordic Film Production.

== Honors and awards ==
Helmer & søn was nominated for an Academy Award for Best Live Action Short Film in 2007. In the same year, Ezra received the Edith Allers grant for up-and-coming artists.

His graduation film Panser was nominated at the Robert Awards, which was presented by the Danish Film Academy, for Best Feature Film - Fiction/Animation. The film tells the story of a new police officer struggling to hold on to his ideals as he navigates his first days on patrol while partnered with an experienced officer.

== Filmography ==
=== Film ===
Year	Title	Credit	Notes
2006	Instinkt	Director/Writer	n/a
2006	Helmer & Søn	Writer	Nominated Best Short Film (Academy Awards)
2007	Marts	Director/Writer	n/a
2008	Patrol	Director; Writer	Nominated for Best Feature Film - Fiction/Animation (Robert Awards)
2015	April 9th	Director	nominated for the Audience Award (Robert Awards); Best Film (Zulu Awards)
2015	Everything's Gonna Be Pink	Director	n/a

=== Television ===
Year	Title	Credit	Notes
2010	Veninder på 1. klasse	Director/Writer	TV series documentary
2017	Below the Surface (Gidseltagningen)	Director	3 episodes
2018	The New Nurses (Sygeplejeskolen)	Director	6 episodes
