= April 9th (film) =

- Film poster
- 9. April
- Directed by: Roni Ezra
- Written by: Tobias Lindholm
- Produced by: René Ezra; Tomas Radoor
- Starring: Lars Mikkelsen; Pilou Asbæk
- Cinematography: Philippe Kress
- Edited by: Peter Brandt
- Music by: Jonas Struck
- Production companies: Nordisk Film; TV2 Danmark; Det Danske Filminstitut
- Distributed by: Nordisk Film
- Release date: 12 March 2015
- Running time: 93 minutes
- Country: Denmark
- Language: Danish
- Budget: 22 million kr.

April 9th (Danish: 9. april) is a 2015 Danish war film directed by Roni Ezra, and starring Pilou Asbæk and Lars Mikkelsen. The film depicts the German invasion of Denmark which commenced on 9 April 1940 and follows a Danish bicycle infantry company sent as a vanguard to slow down the German advance until reinforcements can arrive.

The film's budget was 22 million Danish krone (just over $3 million) and was supported by the Danish Film Institute, TV 2, and the Haderslev Municipality. The film was released in Danish cinemas on 12 March 2015.

== Plot ==
During the night of 9 April 1940, the Danish army is alerted that the German army has crossed the border, and Denmark is now at war with Europe's strongest army. In South Jutland, a Danish bicycle infantry company and motorcycle platoon is ordered to hold off the German advance until reinforcements can arrive but are quickly overwhelmed by superior German forces. During the morning Second Lieutenant Sand (Pilou Asbæk) and his platoon of soldiers battle the Germans and then retreat to Haderslev.

== Cast ==
- Lars Mikkelsen – Lieutenant-Colonel Hintz
- Pilou Asbæk – Second Lieutenant Sand
- Gustav Dyekjær Giese – Private Andersen
- Sebastian Bull Sarning – Private Lundgren
- Joachim Fjelstrup – Sergeant Bundgaard
- Martin Greis – Lieutenant Gjermansen
- Michael Brostrup – Colonel Hartz
- Elliott Crosset Hove – Private Jens-Otto Lassen
- Jannik Lorenzen – Private Gram
- Morten Hauch-Fausbøll – Major Fladsaa
- Mikkel Trøst Bentzen – Private Nørreskov
- Ari Alexander – Private Justesen
- Mathias Lundkvist – Private Kolding
- Jesper Hagelskær Paasch – Major Jepsen
- Jan Jürgensen – Sergent Klostergaard
- Simon Sears – Captain Holm
- Jesper Hagelskær Paasch – Lieutenant Jepsen
- Pelle Emil Hebsgaard – Runner
- Jan Dose – Oberleutnant Becker

== Production ==
The film was directed by Roni Ezra, and the screenplay was by Tobias Lindholm (who also wrote A Hijacking, Borgen, and The Hunt). The outline story was based on eyewitness accounts, conversations, and interviews with the few surviving veterans of 9 April 1940, who fought the invading German Army.

The Mellem Slesvigs Grænser museum in Bylderup-Bov was approached by Nordisk Film in the autumn of 2013 with regards to assisting with uniforms and weapons. In March 2014, the film company collected 120 Danish steel helmets, 100 gas-mask canisters, 50 pairs of wool pants, 24 dummy-rifles, 32 cartridge belts, and a khaki officer coat. Moreover, the museum loaned two old Nimbus motorcycles with side-cars. All equipment was initially transported to Budapest, Hungary, where part of the movie was shot.

The film was also shot in Haderslev, where the streets around Møllepladsen, Sønderbro, and Convent Cemetery were sealed off from 17 to 19 June 2014. Other shooting took place at Jacob Michelsen's Farm in Aabenraa and in Søgårdlejren.

== Reception ==
The film received mixed, but generally favorable reviews from Danish critics, with Berlingske and Ekko giving it 5 out of 6 stars, while others gave it between 2 and 5 out of 6.
