= Henrik Birch =

Danish actor

- Born: 5 September 1956 (age 69); Bjergby, Denmark
- Occupation: Actor
- Years active: 1986-present

Henrik Birch (born 5 September 1956) is a Danish actor. He is best known for his performance as Kesse in The Sunfish for which he won the Bodil Award for Best Actor in a Leading Role and the Robert Award for Best Actor in a Leading Role.

== Selected filmography ==
Film
Year	Title	Role	Notes
2001	Kira's Reason: A Love Story		
2010	Nothing's All Bad		
2013	The Hour of the Lynx		
2014	The Sunfish	Kesse	
2015	The Idealist		

TV
Year	Title	Role	Notes
2006-2008	Anna Pihl	Ole	
2012	The Killing	Anders Ussing	
2020	The Rain	Hans	
