= Caroline Blanco =

Danish film producer

Caroline Blanco (born 1980) is a Danish film producer best known for her collaborations with May el-Toukhy.

== Career ==
Blanco studied producing at the National Film School of Denmark and graduated in 2009. She produced May el-Toukhy's debut film Lang historie kort (2015). Blanco also co-produced el-Toukhy's second film Queen of Hearts (2019) with René Ezra. It won the Nordic Council Film Prize audience award in the World Cinema Dramatic category at the 2019 Sundance Film Festival.

== Personal life ==
Blanco is married to filmmaker Tobias Lindholm. They have three sons.

== Filmography ==
=== Film ===
| Year | Title | Credit | Notes |
|---|---|---|---|
| 2014 | Dannys Dommedag | Producer | |
| 2015 | Lang historie kort | Producer | |
| 2016 | Anti | Producer | |
| 2019 | Queen of Hearts | Co-producer | Nordic Council Film Prize |

=== Television series ===
| Year | Title | Credit | Notes |
|---|---|---|---|
| 2020 | Efterforskningen | Producer | |
