= Snake Killer =

2026 Danish crime drama television series

- Slangedræber
- Genre: Crime drama
- Created by: Anders Ølholm
- Written by: Anders Ølholm
- Directed by: Anders Ølholm; Kaspar Munk
- Starring: Pilou Asbæk; Lars Ranthe; Joey Moe; Joen Højerslev; Mira Elisa Obling; Laura Christensen
- Music by: Martin Dirkov
- Country of origin: Denmark
- Original language: Danish
- No. of seasons: 1
- No. of episodes: 4

Production
- Running time: 50 minutes
- Production company: Nordisk Film Production

Original release
- Network: Prime Video
- Release: 2026

Snake Killer is a Danish crime drama television mini- series created by writer / director Anders Ølholm. It was the first Danish-language scripted original commissioned by Prime Video and was released in the Nordic countries in January 2026.

Pilou Asbæk stars as Brian 'Smiley' Petersen, an officer in the Uropatruljen, a Copenhagen narcotics unit.

== Premise ==
Set in Copenhagen, the series follows Brian 'Smiley' Petersen and other narcotics officers of the Uropatruljen drug squad who go to war with a mysterious crime family after one of their informants is killed.

== Cast ==
- Pilou Asbæk as Brian 'Smiley' Petersen
- Lars Ranthe as Jim Nolsøe
- Joey Moe as Deon Thomsen
- Joen Højerslev as Klaus 'Cosmo' Telling
- Mira Elisa Obling as Louise Knudsen
- Simon Sears as Michael Lerche
- Özlem Saglanmak as Jane Friis
- Laura Christensen as Camilla
- Ali Al-Bayate as Edmond Khaleghi

== Production ==
The series is based on the Uropatruljen, a real narcotics patrol that Cineuropa described as "the most notorious police unit in Danish history". Ølholm, who previously helmed the police thriller Shorta, researched the series for several years, conducting several hundred hours of interviews with a former officer of the unit as well as with colleagues, criminals and informants. He directed the first two episodes and Kaspar Munk the remaining two.

The show was produced by Nordisk Film Production and filmed in Copenhagen and the surrounding area.

Asbæk said of his character that "he isn't meant to be a role model; he's meant to be a reflection of how" people rationalise their behaviour when institutions fail.

== Release ==
Snake Killer was released on Prime Video in the Nordic countries, with international distribution handled by Nordisk Film Production. It was selected for the Official Selection at the ninth edition of Canneseries in 2026.

Snake Killer had its international premiere at Canneseries 2026, one of the world's most prestigious festivals dedicated to television series, where it was selected for the main competition.

== Reception ==
Snake Killer was praised by Danish critics for its authenticity, unique cinematic style and strong performances. "Rarely has a miniseries appeared this fully realized" wrote Vi Elsker Serier, awarding it six stars. Women’s magazine Femina also gave the show six stars, calling the series "nothing short of fantastic."

The podcast What 2 Watch awarded it five stars as did entertainment news website Arkaden, which hailed Snake Killer as "a tour de force in the Danish series format."

Filmsiden, which also gave five stars, praised the intense atmosphere and brutal realism, describing Snake Killer as "one of the most significant Danish crime series in recent times."

Danish newspaper Berlingske was also enthusiastic, favorably comparing the show to American crime drama The Wire.

"With the high-octane thriller Shorta, Anders Ølholm demonstrated an exceptional knack for crafting testosterone-fueled, raucous action; Snake Killer is similarly harsh and brutal, yet distinctly Danish - and it has more to say than one might initially expect."

Jyllands-Posten described the series as "binge-worthy entertainment of a high caliber" awarding it four stars. Filmmagasinet Ekko also gave the show four stars as did Politiken critic Henrik Palle, who called the series "genuinely exciting and full of action." Soundvenue praised the series, also comparing it to The Wire.

In a review for the Swedish website Filmtopp, Thindra Rundström praised the cinematography and the cast; "The ensemble is fantastic. Pilou Asbæk, as the charismatic Brian 'Smiley' Petersen, possesses exactly the charm the role demands."
