= The Hour of the Lynx =

2013 film

- Danish: I lossens time
- Directed by: Søren Kragh-Jacobsen
- Starring: Sofie Gråbøl; Signe Egholm Olsen
- Release date: 23 May 2013
- Running time: 93 minutes
- Countries: Denmark; Sweden
- Language: Danish

The Hour of the Lynx (Danish: I lossens time) is a 2013 Danish/Swedish drama film directed by Søren Kragh-Jacobsen. It is based on a play by Per Olov Enquist. The screenplay was written by Kragh-Jacobsen, Enquist, Jonas T. Bengtsson, and Tobias Lindholm. The film premiered on May 23, 2013.

== Plot ==
Helen, a priest, is contacted by a researcher named Lisbeth, who desperately needs her help. Lisbeth is running an experiment at a secure institution in which traumatized and violent patients are given responsibility for caring for a pet.

The experiment takes a disturbing turn when a young patient attempts to take his own life, claiming that it is part of God’s plan. Racing against time, the two women must work together to understand the young man and save his wounded soul.

== Cast ==
- Sofie Gråbøl - Helen
- Signe Egholm Olsen - Lisbeth
- Frederik Christian Johansen - Drengen
- Søren Malling - Knud
- Lia Boysen - Mother
- Börje Ahlstedt - Grandfather
- Pelle Falk Krusbæk - Drengen 8 years old
- Jens Jørn Spottag - Overlægen
- Henrik Birch - Eriksen
