= Nordvest (film) =

Danish 2013 film

- Directed by: Michael Noer
- Written by: Rasmus Heisterberg; Michael Noer
- Starring: Gustav Dyekjær Giese; Lene Maria Christensen; Roland Møller
- Distributed by: Nordisk Film
- Release date: 27 January 2013
- Running time: 91 min
- Country: Denmark
- Language: Danish

Nordvest is a Danish action-drama film from 2013, directed by Michael Noer and written by Rasmus Heisterberg. It was Noer's first solo project as a movie director, after he directed the prison film R (2010) together with Tobias Lindholm.

Nordvest got its world premiere at the Rotterdam International Film Festival in January 2013. It was also the opening film at the Copenhagen film festival in April 2013.

== Reception ==
Nordvest received generally good reviews and ended up selling 88,849 tickets in Danish cinemas. It won awards including the international critics’ Fipresci award at the Göteborg International Film Festival and a Special Jury Award and the Critics’ Prize at the International Crime Film Festival in Beaune. On review aggregator website Rotten Tomatoes, the film holds an approval rating of 90% based on 10 reviews, with an average rating of 6.4/10.
