= Nordisk Film =

Danish entertainment company

Nordisk Film A/S
- Nordisk Film's current logo since September 2020
- Formerly: Ole Olsen Filmfabrik
- Type: Subsidiary
- Industry: Entertainment
- Founded: 6 November 1906; 120 years ago
- Founder: Ole Olsen
- Headquarters: Valby, Copenhagen, Denmark
- Key people: Allan Mathson Hansen (CEO)
- Products: Motion pictures, television programs, cinemas, event tickets
- Revenue: ▲559 million€ (2018)
- Operating income: ▼€28 million (2018)
- Parent: Egmont Group (1992–present)
- Subsidiaries: Avalanche Studios Group; Globalgate Entertainment; Supermassive Games; MercurySteam (40%)
- Website: nordiskfilm.com

Nordisk Films promotional poster

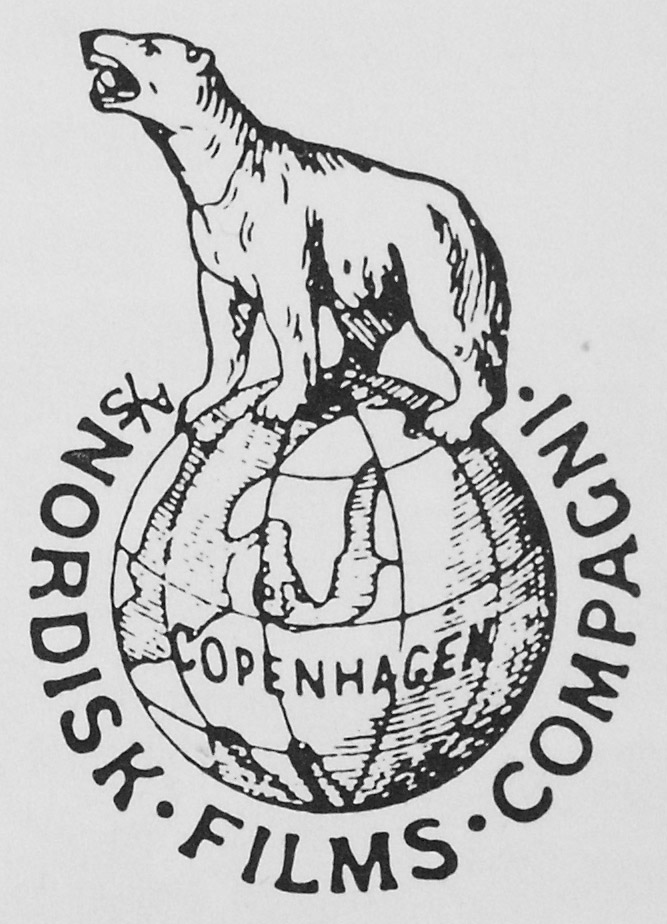
Nordisk Film 1906 logo

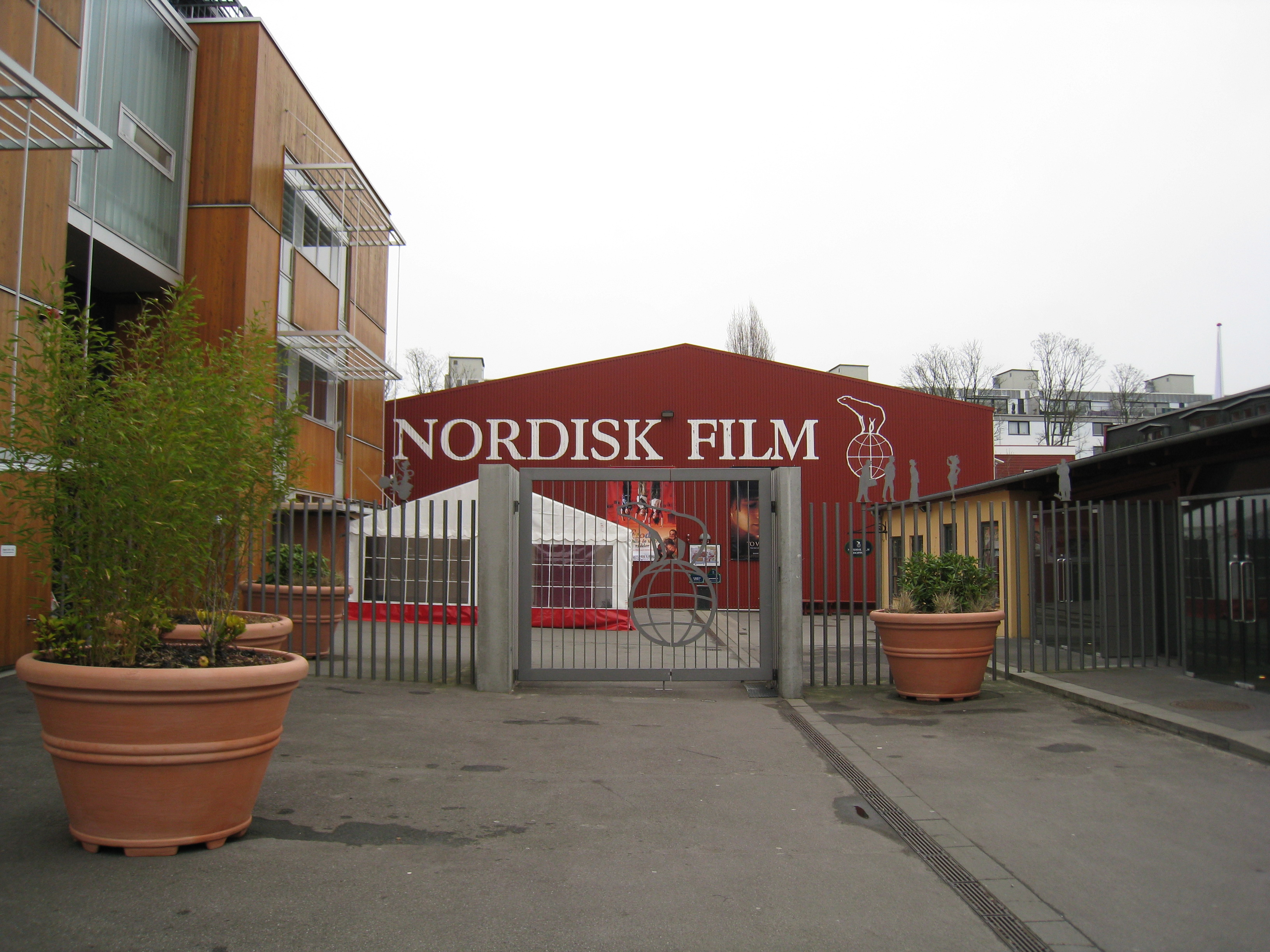
Main gate of Nordisk Film in 2008

Nordisk Film A/S (lit. 'Nordic Film') is a Danish film studio owned by the Egmont Group. The multimedia entertainment company is also involved in television production, cinemas, computer games and advertising. The film studio was established in 1906 in Valby, Copenhagen, by filmmaker Ole Olsen. It is the fourth-oldest film studio in the world, and the oldest studio to be continuously active. The logo consists of a polar bear standing on the globe. It also distributes films created by other production companies.

Through the Nordisk Film Fonden (Nordisk Film Foundation), Nordisk Film develops Danish acting talents by means of scholarships, as well as awarding prizes in Denmark (several awards, collectively known as "Isbjørnen"), Norway (several awards, collectively known as "Isbjørnen"), and Finland (the Nordisk Film Prisen, presented at the Jussi Awards).

== History ==
Ole Olsen started his company in the Copenhagen suburb of Valby under the name Ole Olsen Filmfabrik ("Ole Olsen's Film Factory"), but soon changed it to the Nordisk Films Kompagnie.

In 1908, Olsen opened an affiliate branch in New York, the Great Northern Film Company, to handle the distribution of his films to the American market. In 1909, having been excluded from the MPPC cartel in the United States, which Olsen had hoped to join, Nordisk participated in the Paris Film Congress in a failed attempt by major European producers to form a similar monopoly. It became a publicly traded company in 1911 as Nordisk Film. During the 1910s, the company created popular silent films with movie stars such as Valdemar Psilander and Clara Pontoppidan.

When Germany invaded Denmark during World War II, the company was locked out of the nationalized German film industry and lost large amounts of revenue.

In 1992, it merged with the Egmont media group, operating as electronic media production and distribution group. The total revenues in 2018 amounted to approximately €559 million.

Nordisk Film is the fourth-oldest film studio (as of 2011) in the world behind Gaumont, Pathé, and Titanus, and the oldest studio to be continuously active.

In 2026, Nordisk Film was involved as a production partner in the TV 2 deception format Alle elsker Rasmus (Everybody Loves Rasmus) by offering the Danish comedian Rasmus Wallbridge the prospect of concluding a supposed film agreement. In the show, comedian Rasmus Wallbridge was observed and filmed over months without his knowledge, including in private moments. The broadcast triggered a fierce debate in Denmark about public bullying and the ethical boundaries of media entertainment.

== Operations ==
Nordisk Film A/S produces and co-produces national and international feature films in Denmark, Norway and Sweden, which are distributed to cinemas around the Nordic countries, including Nordisk Film Cinemas in Denmark, Norway and Sweden. The films are also distributed internationally for viewing in cinemas, on video and on television.

Nordisk Film produces video games through a number of game studios invested in by Nordisk Film Games, distributes PlayStation in the Nordic and Baltic countries and develops global digital gifting solutions through GoGift.

== Business areas ==
=== Nordisk Film Production ===
Nordisk Film Production focuses primarily on the Scandinavian market but produces feature films, animation films, short films, TV series, and TV documentaries for both the Scandinavian and international market. They have a hand in roughly 15 productions per year, spanning a range of formats and genres. Nordisk Film Production

In October 2009, Nordisk sold its TV production unit to the Banijay Group.

=== Nordisk Film Distribution ===
Nordisk Film Distribution handles and distributes the rights to its own productions, a number of local films as well as independent productions. Nordisk Film also partners with international film studios for distribution in Scandinavia, such as Lionsgate.

=== Nordisk Film Interactive ===
Nordisk Film Interactive has exclusive distribution rights to Sony PlayStation products in the Nordic countries, and is thereby responsible for a substantial business area in Nordisk Film.

=== Nordisk Film Cinemas ===
Nordisk Film Cinemas is a cinema chain in Denmark, Sweden and Norway, screening for approximately ten million cinema guests per year. The company also offers two online platforms - kino.dk and filmweb.no (only available in Danish) - where the customer can watch, review and discuss current films.

=== Nordisk Games ===
Nordisk Games is an investor in and owner of several European game studios including, as of 2025, Avalanche Studios Group, Supermassive Games, MercurySteam, and Star Stable Entertainment. Former game investments included Nitro Games, Kogama, Flashbulb Games, Raw Fury and Reto-Moto.

In May 2018, it was announced that Nordisk Games had acquired all of Avalanche Studios.

In November 2021, it acquired the majority stake in the company of Star Stable Online.

In July 2022, Nordisk Games acquired all of Supermassive Games

In April 2023, the Founder of Nordisk Games, Mikkel Weider, exits as CEO.

== Foundation and awards ==
Through the Nordisk Film Foundation, Nordisk Film develops Danish acting talents with travel scholarships. As of 2024, the Nordisk Film Foundation stated an annual budget of DKK 7 million for the development of the Danish film industry though scholarships, project grants and awards.

=== Isbjørnen ===
The "Isbjørnen" awards are awarded at the Nordisk Film studios in the Valby district of Copenhagen, Denmark. They comprise a set of honorary awards.

In 2024, a one-off prize, the Ballings Særpris (Special Prize), was awarded to mark the 100th birthday of Danish filmmaker Erik Balling. This was awarded to director Anders Thomas Jensen. A new award was inaugurated in 2025, the Alice Prisen (Alice Prize), which celebrates the work of the first female Danish film director, who directed over 70 films, Alice O'Fredericks.

The regular awards are (since 2025):

- Nordisk Film Prize
- Ove Sprogøe Award
- Erik Balling Travel Grant
- Alice Prisen (Alice Prize)

=== Finland ===
In Finland, the Nordisk Film Prisen, worth EUR 20,000, is awarded as part of the Jussi Awards.

=== Norway ===
The awards given in Norway are sometimes referred to as Isbjørnen Norway. They comprise:

- Nordisk Films Talentpris (formerly known as Nordisk Film Prisen), for an emerging filmmaker
- Kon-Tiki-prisen (formerly known as Olsen Banden Prisen), a filmmaker or actor who has achieved international recognition
- Veiviseren, for a person or organisation that has made a significant industry contribution and created a positive difference in Norwegian film

== Selected feature films ==
- Home (2026)
- The Crow (2024; distribution in Scandinavia only)
- Sisu (2022; distribution in Scandinavia only; internationally distributed by Sony Pictures Worldwide Acquisitions)
- Dog (2022; Danish distribution only; produced by Metro-Goldwyn-Mayer and FilmNation Entertainment)
- The Tunnel (2019)
- Midsommar (2019; co-production and distribution in Scandinavia)
- Before the Frost (2019)
- Checkered Ninja (2018)
- Animals United (2016)
- A War (2015) - nominated for Academy Award for Best Foreign Language Film
- Key House Mirror (2015)
- A War (2015)
- April 9th (2015)
- Testament of Youth (2015)
- When Animals Dream (2014)
- Speed Walking (2014)
- Sorrow and Joy (2013)
- Nordvest (2013)
- Kon-Tiki (2013)
- A Royal Affair (2012) - nominated for Academy Award for Best Foreign Language Film
- A Hijacking (2012)
- The Reunion (2011)
- A Funny Man (2011)
- Ronal the Barbarian (2011)
- In a Better World (2010) - Won Academy Award for Best International Feature Film
- R (2010)
- Ploddy the Police Car Makes a Splash (2009)
- Rejsen til Saturn (2008)
- Kurt Turns Evil (2008)
- Jungledyret Hugo 3: Fræk, flabet, og fri (2007)
- Quest for a Heart (2007)
- After the Wedding 2006 - nominated for Academy Award for Best Foreign Language Film
- Terkel in Trouble (2004)
- Help! I'm a Fish (2000)
- Hard Rain (1998; co-production and distribution in Scandinavia)
- Barbara (1997 film)
- Jungledyret Hugo 2: Den store filmhelt (1996)
- Jungledyret Hugo (1993)
- Fuglekrigen i Kanøfleskoven (1990)
- Waltzing Regitze (1989) - nominated for Academy Award for Best Foreign Language Film
- Babette's Feast (1987) - Won Academy Award for Best International Feature Film
- Kispus (1956) - first Danish feature movie in color
- Qivitoq - Fjeldgængeren (1956) - nominated for Academy Award for Best Foreign Language Film
- Adam and Eve (1953)
- Ditte, Child of Man (1946) - listed in Denmark's cultural canon
- Præsidenten (1919)
- Atlantis (1913)

== TV series ==
- The Team (2015)
- Första Kärleken (1992)
- BECK (1997–2015)
- Arne Dahl (co-pro) (2015)
- Jungledyret Hugo (2002–2003)
- The Fairytaler (2002–2003)
- Fenris (2022)
