= Before the Frost (film) =

2018 film

- Directed by: Michael Noer
- Written by: Michael Noer
- Starring: Jesper Christensen
- Production company: Nordisk Film
- Distributed by: Nordisk Film Biografdistribution
- Release dates: 7 September 2018 (TIFF); 10 January 2019 (Denmark)
- Running time: 104 minutes
- Country: Denmark
- Language: Danish

Before the Frost (Danish: Før frosten) is a 2018 Danish drama film directed by Michael Noer. It was screened in the Contemporary World Cinema section at the 2018 Toronto International Film Festival.

== Cast ==
- Jesper Christensen as Jens
- Magnus Krepper as Gustav
- Gustav Dyekjær Giese as Laurits
- Elliott Crosset Hove as Peder
- Clara Rosager as Signe
- Rasmus Hammerich as Holger
