= Niels Hausgaard =

Danish singer, songwriter and comedian (born 1944)

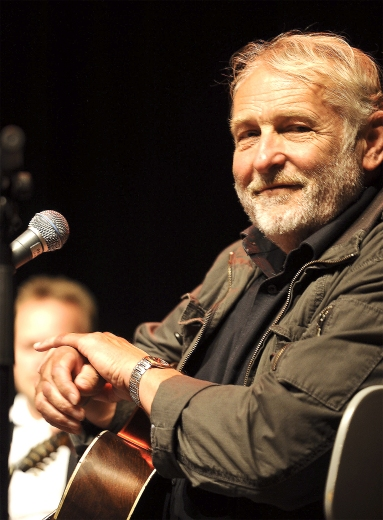
Niels Hausgaard, 2013

Niels Samuel Hausgaard (born 31 August 1944) is a Danish singer, songwriter and comedian. He is best known for his songs and understated comedy which often combine dry observations on the human condition with the trials and tribulations of life in a welfare state. Originally, Hausgaard spoke with a distinct dialect in his shows, vendelbomål, which has become something of a trademark during his sets, but in recent years it has been somewhat toned down.

Originally from Hirtshals, he now lives in Hundelev. Both towns are situated in Vendsyssel, Region Nordjylland, Denmark.

== Awards and honors ==
In Denmark, Hausgaard has been awarded several prizes for his contribution to Danish culture.

- 2001 and 2004, Best TV entertainment
- 2006, The Gelsted Prize
- 2006, Gelsted-Kirk-Scherfig Prize
- 2006, Årets Sangskriver
- 2012, Den Gyldne Grundtvig

The prize in 2006 by Gelsted-Kirk-Scherfig-Fonden, included 25,000 Danish kroner (about 5,000 US dollars), but he gave the money to the newspaper Dagbladet Arbejderen in an effort to support critical journalism.

== Discography ==
- 1974 – Et Portræt
- 1975 – Til Ane
- 1977 – Men det går jo nok
- 1979 – Kunst
- 1982 – Når alt kommer til alt
- 1983 – Han tog realen med
- 1985 – Kom lad os danse
- 1988 – Som jeg altid plejer at sige
- 1991 – I fornuftens land
- 1992 – En halv time tidligere
- 2006 – Flyv så

== Literature ==
- Thorkil Green Nielsen (1988). Niels Hausgaard – mellem linjerne (in Danish). Hovedland. ISBN 8788589927. A portrait.
