= Queen of Hearts (2019 film) =

2019 film

- Film poster
- Directed by: May el-Toukhy
- Written by: Maren Louise Käehne; May el-Toukhy
- Produced by: Caroline Blanco; Rene Ezra
- Starring: Trine Dyrholm; Gustav Lindh
- Cinematography: Jasper Spanning
- Edited by: Rasmus Stensgaard Madsen
- Music by: Jon Ekstrand
- Distributed by: Nordisk Film
- Release dates: 26 January 2019 (Sundance); 28 March 2019 (Denmark)
- Running time: 127 minutes
- Country: Denmark
- Language: Danish

Queen of Hearts (Danish: Dronningen, The Queen) is a 2019 Danish drama film directed by May el-Toukhy, and starring Trine Dyrholm and Gustav Lindh. The Danish and English film titles obliquely refer to the Queen of Hearts character in the children's book Alice's Adventures in Wonderland which is mentioned repeatedly in the film. The film was selected as the Danish entry for the Best International Feature Film at the 92nd Academy Awards, though it was not nominated. The film won the 2019 Nordic Council Film Prize.

== Plot ==
Anne is a lawyer working on three cases of rape and violent abuse of young women. She is married to Peter, a physician, and they have young twin daughters, Frida and Fanny. Peter's teenage son from his past marriage, Gustav, lives in Sweden with his mother Rebecca. The family plans for Gustav to move in with Anne and Peter. Gustav arrives and Anne flirts with him. Gustav begins to have conflicts with Peter, pushing to move out on his own despite being a minor. One day, Anne returns home to find there has been a burglary. The incident is reported to the police, but afterwards Anne finds an item in Gustav's laundry that was in her bag, stolen during the break-in. She realizes that Gustav was responsible for the robbery and confronts him with the evidence. Anne promises to keep the matter a secret if Gustav does his part in the household. From then on, Gustav joins in the social life of the family, for instance reading the Danish version of Alice's Adventures in Wonderland for the twin girls, which Anne herself also does.

One night, Gustav brings his girlfriend Amanda home. Anne hears the couple having sex and is aroused.

Peter and Anne entertain guests on their balcony, but Anne leaves the group to take Gustav to a bar. There, she kisses him. Later at night, she enters his bedroom and seduces him. The two begin a sexual relationship. Gustav interviews Anne with a tape recorder, asking her various questions, such as about her first sexual relationship. Anne says it was with someone she should not have had sex with. The family celebrates Frida and Fanny's birthday. When Anne and Gustav step away, Gustav kisses her. A guest, Anne's sister Lina, witnesses the encounter and, upset, leaves the party. Anne fears Lina will tell Peter, and breaks off her relationship with Gustav.

Gustav and Peter leave to spend time at their cabin in the woods. After their return, Peter tells Anne that Gustav wants to go to a boarding school, and told his father what had happened between him and Anne. Anne denies the accusation, claiming Gustav hates her for ending Peter and Rebecca's marriage. She also tells Peter that Gustav was responsible for the burglary. Anne, Peter, and Gustav then sit down together, where Anne continues to deny the affair. Gustav departs for a boarding school. Much later, Gustav visits the office of Anne and threatens to report her for the illegal relationship, but she replies he is not a credible witness and never will be believed. He calls on her house at night asking for his father but is rejected by Anne who leaves him weeping on the ground. At a party for Anne, Peter is called with the message that Gustav has gone missing from his school. Peter is called to Stockholm by the police. It turns out a hunter has discovered Gustav's body near the cabin, where he froze to death. When Anne tells Peter that Gustav's death is not his fault, Peter violently silences her. In the end, Peter, Anne and the two young girls, dressed in black, drive in silence in their car, presumably to Gustav's funeral.

== Cast ==
- Trine Dyrholm as Anne
- Gustav Lindh as Gustav
- Magnus Krepper as Peter
- Preben Kristensen as Erik
- Mads Wille as Karsten
- Peter Khouri as Janus
- Diem Camille Gbogou as Louise

== Production ==
In reference to the sex scenes, protagonist Trine Dyrholm said: "We had the first meeting about the nude scenes very early on with both the producer and the director. They told us what they had in mind. And we agreed that you could go to the producer along the way if there was something someone didn't want to go along with. We were even sent storyboard illustrations of the scene frame by frame, and the prosthetics that would resemble the male genitalia were made. I would almost compare working on nude scenes here to working on a stunt scene. When you have to do that kind of scene, it's always a bit awkward, but because it was such a safe working space and everything was agreed in advance, it worked."

== Reception ==
Guy Lodge of Variety magazine called it a "sleek, engrossing melodrama." Dyrholm's performance was especially praised. The Los Angeles Times review referred to the "tricky brilliance" of the film.

On Rotten Tomatoes the film has an approval rating of 97% based on 30 reviews. The site's critical consensus reads, "Led by an exceptional performance from Trine Dyrholm, Queen of Hearts is a bold and uncompromising look at the darkness that can lie within family, directed with formidable skill by May El-Toukhy."

The film won nine Robert Awards, including Best Danish Film. It also won four Bodil Awards, including Best Danish Film. At the 2019 Sundance Film Festival, the film won the Audience Award in the World Cinema Dramatic category.

== Remake ==
A French remake was directed by Catherine Breillat, from a screenplay written by Breillat in collaboration with Pascal Bonitzer. Starring Léa Drucker and Samuel Kircher, the film premiered in competition at the 76th Cannes Film Festival.

== See also ==
- List of submissions to the 92nd Academy Awards for Best International Feature Film
- List of Danish submissions for the Academy Award for Best International Feature Film
- Queen of Hearts (Alice's Adventures in Wonderland), which the film title alludes to.
- Festen (1998) and The Hunt (Jagten, 2012), recent Danish films by Tomas Winterberg with related sexual themes.
