= The Sunfish =

- Film poster
- Directed by: Søren Balle
- Written by: Søren Balle; Lærke Sanderhoff
- Starring: Henrik Birch; Susanne Storm
- Distributed by: SF Film
- Release date: January 2014 (Göteborg)
- Country: Denmark
- Language: Danish

The Sunfish (Danish: Klumpfisken) is a 2014 Danish film directed by Søren Balle, and written by Balle and Lærke Sanderhoff and features actors Henrik Birch and Susanne Storm.

The film won a Bodil Award for Henrik Birch as "Best Leading Actor" and Susanne Storm as "Best Supporting Actress". And it won a 2015 Robert Award for best adapted screenplay for Søren Balle and Lærke Sanderhoff.

== Cast ==
- Henrik Birch - Kesse
- Susanne Storm - Gerd
- Mikkel Vadsholt - Sorte
- Kresten Andersen - Henning
