= Land of Mine =

2015 film

- Theatrical release poster
- Under sandet
- Directed by: Martin Zandvliet
- Screenplay by: Martin Zandvliet
- Produced by: Malte Grunert; Mikael Chr. Rieks
- Starring: Roland Møller; Mikkel Boe Følsgaard
- Cinematography: Camilla Hjelm Knudsen
- Edited by: Per Sandholt; Molly Malene Stensgaard
- Music by: Sune Martin
- Distributed by: Nordisk Film
- Release dates: 10 September 2015 (TIFF); 3 December 2015 (Denmark)
- Running time: 100 minutes
- Countries: Denmark; Germany
- Languages: German; Danish; English
- Budget: DKK 35.5 million
- Box office: US$3.2 million

Land of Mine (Danish: Under sandet, lit. 'Under the Sand') is a 2015 Danish historical war drama film directed by Martin Zandvliet. It was shown in the Platform section of the 2015 Toronto International Film Festival. It was selected and nominated for the Best Foreign Language Film category at the 89th Academy Awards.

The film is inspired by real events when over 1.3 million German landmines were cleared from Denmark's shores and fields from May to September 1945 and tells a story of German prisoners of war ordered to clear land mines after World War II in the German Mine Sweeping Administration. It is estimated that more than 2,000 soldiers including a number of teenagers, under the command of Danish officers, removed mines. 149 of them lost their lives during the five months of mine clearing, 165 were severely wounded and 167 lightly wounded. The removal was part of a controversial agreement between the German Commander General Georg Lindemann, the Danish Government and the British Armed Forces, under which German soldiers with experience in defusing mines would be in charge of clearing the mine fields. In retrospect, this activity has been condemned as a war crime since it violated the Geneva Convention of 1929, which states in Article 32 that no prisoner of war must be forced to participate in dangerous or unhealthy labour.

== Plot ==
Following the end of World War II in Europe and the liberation of Denmark from German occupation in May 1945, the Wehrmacht and SS occupiers became prisoners of war. A group of young German prisoners are sent to the west coast where they are trained to use their bare hands to remove the landmines that the Germans had buried in the sand. After their training, the boys are left under the charge of Danish sergeant Carl Leopold Rasmussen, who is determined to treat the young prisoners without sympathy. Marching his squad onto the dunes, he promises that they will return home in three months, if they can each defuse six mines per hour for a total of 45,000 mines.

One of the boys, Sebastian Schumann, attempts to remain optimistic as they discuss their plans for when they return home. The POWs are given little food due to post-war shortages and begin to suffer from malnourishment, with Ernst befriending a young local girl to steal some bread from her. One day, while defusing a mine, Wilhelm's arms are blown off and he later dies in a field hospital. Most of the boys become ill after eating grain contaminated with rat faeces that they found on a nearby farm; they are treated by Rasmussen who makes them purge themselves with seawater. Rasmussen gradually treats his charges more kindly, stealing food from the base for them and tries to maintain morale by reporting that Wilhelm has survived. He also allows the boys to use a device invented by Sebastian to improve productivity.

Hearing rumours of Rasmussen stealing food for the boys, his commanding officer Captain Ebbe Jensen brings a group of British soldiers to abuse and torment the boys. Rasmussen stops them but is confronted about the theft by Ebbe, who accuses him of being sympathetic towards the Germans. During another day of demining, Werner is blown to bits after encountering landmines buried one above another, leaving his twin brother Ernst distraught.

After a casual game of football, Rasmussen's dog is blown up in a supposedly cleared zone of the beach. This causes Rasmussen to snap and begin abusing the boys again. He forces them to march close together across the cleared zones of the beach to confirm that they are safe. When a young local girl walks out into an uncleared area of beach, her mother comes looking for Rasmussen only to find him gone. The boys volunteer to help save the girl. Ernst walks through the uncleared minefield to keep the little girl calm whilst Sebastian clears a path to safety for her. They manage to rescue her but instead of returning to safety with Sebastian, Ernst decides he cannot go on without his brother and commits suicide by walking into the uncleared section and is promptly killed.

After witnessing this act of kindness and bravery from the boys, Rasmussen relents in his treatment of them and reassures a grieving Sebastian that they will soon be able to go home. While four of the boys continue to clear the beach with Rasmussen, the rest of them are loading unexploded mines onto a truck. When one of the boys tosses a mine that was not properly defused onto the truckbed of deactivated mines, he accidentally sets off a massive explosion which kills himself and his nearby comrades. Only Sebastian, Ludwig, Helmut and Rodolf remain.

Although the boys had been promised that they would be sent home after defusing all of the mines, without Rasmussen's knowledge Jensen decides to send the surviving four to join a team defusing landmines in another coastal area. Rasmussen argues in vain for Jensen to rescind the order. He decides to rescue the boys and then drives them within 500 metres (1,600 ft) of the German border so they can run to their freedom.

== Cast ==
- Roland Møller as Sgt. Carl Leopold Rasmussen
- Mikkel Boe Følsgaard as Captain Ebbe Jensen
- Laura Bro as Karin
- Louis Hofmann as Sebastian Schumann
- Joel Basman as Oberleutnant Helmut Morbach
- Oskar Bökelmann as Ludwig Haffke
- Emil Belton as Ernst Lessner
- Oskar Belton as Werner Lessner
- Leon Seidel as Wilhelm LeBern
- Karl Alexander Seider as Manfred
- Maximilian Beck as August Kluger
- August Carter as Rodolf Selke
- Tim Bülow as Hermann Marklein
- Alexander Rasch as Friedrich Schnurr
- Julius Kochinke as Johann Wolff
- Zoe Zandvliet as Elizabeth

== Production ==
=== Historical background ===
The film is about a chapter of Denmark's post-war history that has not previously received much attention, although it was treated in Ole Palsbo's Danish documentary Livsfare - Miner from 1946.

The west coast of Jutland was taken over by the Germans and the coast was part of the Atlantic Wall, which stretched from Norway in the north to Spain in the south. When the Germans abandoned their positions in May 1945, they also left behind a lot of equipment - and not least buried mines along the west coast. Skallingen in the northern Wadden Sea is an important area in relation to the film and the history.

German prisoners of war were handed over by the British in the period after 4 May 1945 into Danish custody. It is believed that over 2,000 German soldiers were forced to remove mines along the west coast. 179 of them lost their lives during the 5-month effort, 165 were seriously injured, 167 slightly injured. Some of them were boys as young as 16.

=== Filming ===
The film had a budget of 35.5 million kroner. Land of Mine received over eight million kroner in support from the Danish Film Institute, of which one million comes from the regional pool. Varde Municipality, which has many kilometers of beach along the west coast of Jutland, has invested 1.2 million kroner in the film and hopes to recoup the money through increased tourist interest. Filming began on 30 June 2014, and ended on 2 August 2014. The film was shot in the area around Blåvand, on location on stretches of the West Coast, and in Oksbøllejren and areas in Varde. The use of the historical beaches led to the discovery of a real mine during the production.

The main source of inspiration for the film is the book Under tvang, from 1998 by historian and lawyer Helge Hagemann, which documents what happened in the months after World War II, when 2,000 young German prisoners of war were ordered to clear the Jutland west coast of more than one and a half million buried mines. He is one of the few Danish historians who has dealt with the Germans who were forced to walk or crawl on their stomachs through the West Jutland sand, beat with wooden sticks, dig out the mines, and dismantle them with their bare hands.

The Museum for Varde By og Omegn has purchased the sets from the film. The local newspaper JydskeVestkysten reported that the museum had been gathering knowledge in order to tell about the mine clearance for the past 10 years, and that the film has given rise to the first special exhibition at a museum, the Tirpitz position, which will deal with that chapter of history. The exhibition is part of a larger story about the Atlantic Wall at the museum, designed by Bjarke Ingels' design studio BIG, and which was completed in 2017. The museum contains three permanent exhibitions and a special exhibition, the first of which was about the mine clearance.

== Reception ==
=== Release ===
Upon its release, the film sold roughly 115,808 tickets in Denmark, and was estimated to have been seen by 175,000 in the country. The film premiered in Danish cinemas on 3 December 2015, and by 7 December, it had sold 32,000 cinema tickets including previews. On the same day, it was also in first place in terms of the most tickets sold on Monday, beating strong films such as Spectre and The Hunger Games: Mockingjay - Part 2.

=== Critical response ===
Review aggregator Rotten Tomatoes gives the film a 92% rating, with an average of 7.44/10, based on reviews from 107 critics. The website's critical consensus states: "Land of Mine uses an oft-forgotten chapter from the aftermath of World War II to tell a hard-hitting story whose period setting belies its timeless observations about bloodshed and forgiveness." On Metacritic, it has a weighted average score of 75 out of 100, based on 26 critics, indicating "generally favorable" reviews.

The film gained a standing ovation at the Toronto International Film Festival, with Stephen Farber of The Hollywood Reporter stating "Director Martin Zandvliet has come up with a fresh and compelling approach to this well-traveled territory" and David D'Arcy of the Screen Daily writing that "Land of Mine achieves moments of chilling suspense in scenes of untrained soldiers defusing mines by hand and in the bloody bodies that leap into the air when the boys fail". Domestically it received five out of six from critics, who all stated that it was the best Danish film of the year. It was selected to play at Sundance in 2016.

The film was well received by Danish critics. Jyllands-Posten gave the film five out of six and called it "this year's best Danish film... It's such a great film that I thought of Bille August when he was at his best, like with Pelle the Conqueror..." In Berlingske the film was awarded four out of six, praising the central scenes as a textbook example of cinematic suspense building. The film also received positive reviews in both B.T. and Ekstra Bladet, both of whom the film five out of six.

=== Accolades ===
Land of Mine has also won numerous awards, including Best Actor, Best Supporting Actor and Best Danish Film at the Bodil Awards.

Year	Award	Category	Nominee(s)	Result	Ref(s)
2015	Gijón International Film Festival	Audience Award	Land of Mine	Won	
2015	Hamburg Film Festival	Art Cinema Award	Land of Mine	Nominated	
2015	Tokyo International Film Festival	Tokyo Grand Prix	Land of Mine	Nominated	
2015	Tokyo International Film Festival	Best Actor Award	Roland Møller & Louis Hofmann	Won	
2015	Toronto International Film Festival	Platform Prize	Land of Mine	Nominated	
2016	AFI Fest	World Cinema Audience Award	Land of Mine	Won	
2016	Bodil Awards	Best Danish Film	Land of Mine	Won	
2016	Bodil Awards	Best Actor	Roland Møller	Won	
2016	Bodil Awards	Best Supporting Actor	Louis Hofmann	Won	
2016	European Film Awards	Best Cinematographer	Camilla Hjelm Knudsen	Won	
2016	European Film Awards	Best Costume Design	Stefanie Bieker	Won	
2016	European Film Awards	Best Hair and Make-up	Barbara Kreuzer	Won	
2016	Gothenburg Film Festival	Best Nordic Film	Land of Mine	Won	
2016	Hong Kong International Film Festival	SIGNIS Awards	Land of Mine	Won	
2016	Miskolc International Film Festival	Adolph Zukor Prize	Land of Mine	Won	
2016	Miskolc International Film Festival	International Federation of Film Critics Award	Land of Mine	Won	
2016	Miskolc International Film Festival	International Ecumenical Award	Land of Mine	Won	
2016	Mill Valley Film Festival	World Cinema Audience Favorite	Land of Mine	2nd Place	
2016	Nordic Council	Nordic Council Film Prize	Land of Mine	Nominated	
2016	Rotterdam International Film Festival	Warsteiner Audience Award	Land of Mine	Won	
2016	Rotterdam International Film Festival	MovieZone Award	Land of Mine	Won	
2016	Sydney Film Festival	Audience Award	Land of Mine	2nd Place	
2016	Sydney Film Festival	Sydney Film Prize	Land of Mine	Nominated	
2017	Academy Awards	Best Foreign Language Film	Land of Mine	Nominated	
2018	Australian Film Critics Association	Best International Film (Foreign Language)	Land of Mine	Nominated	

== See also ==
- List of submissions to the 89th Academy Awards for Best Foreign Language Film
- List of Danish submissions for the Academy Award for Best Foreign Language Film
- Ten Seconds to Hell
