= Nothing's All Bad =

- Film poster
- Danish: Smukke mennesker
- Directed by: Mikkel Munch-Fals
- Starring: Bodil Jørgensen; Henrik Prip
- Release dates: 19 September 2010 (San Sebastian); 23 September 2010 (Denmark)
- Running time: 93 minutes
- Country: Denmark
- Language: Danish

Nothing's All Bad (Danish: Smukke mennesker) is a 2010 Danish drama film directed by Mikkel Munch-Fals.

== Cast ==
- Bodil Jørgensen as Ingeborg
- Henrik Prip as Anders
- Sebastian Jessen as Jonas
- Mille Lehfeldt as Anna
- Stefan Pagels Andersen as Jonas' ex bofælle
- Jesper Asholt as Bingoværten
- Henrik Birch as Anders' direktør
- Rasmus Bjerg as Pornoshopindehaver
- Carsten Bjørnlund as Kunde hos prostitueret
- Michelle Bjørn-Andersen as Tove
- Nicolas Bro as Læge på kræftafdeling
- Martin Buch as Ingeborgs direktør
- Christina Chanée as Thaikvinde
- Stine Fischer Christensen as Prostitueret
