= Michael Noer =

Danish film director (born 1978)

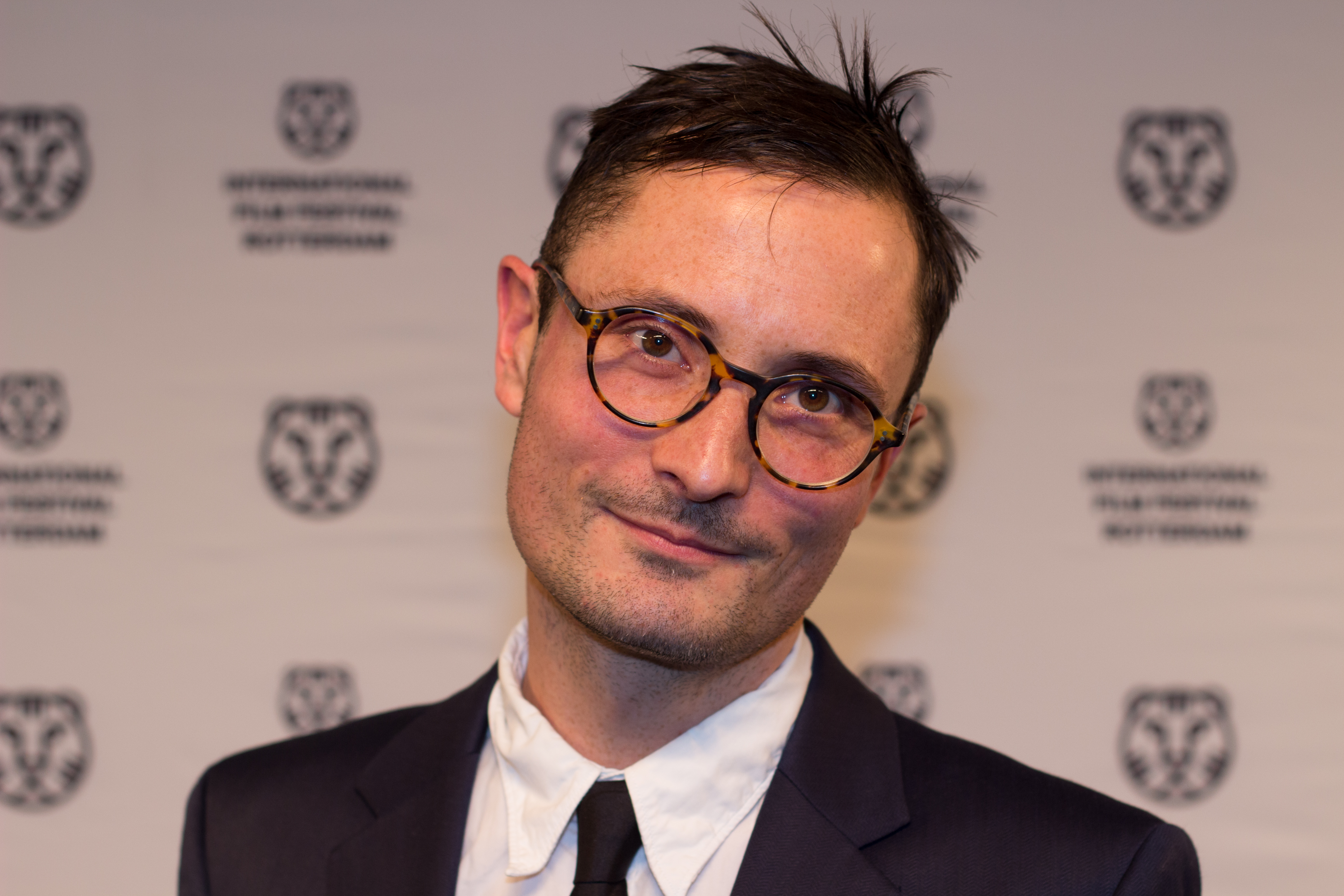
- Noer at the International Film Festival Rotterdam in January 2015
- Born: 27 December 1978 (age 46); Esbjerg, Denmark
- Occupation: Film director
- Years active: 2003–present

Michael Noer (Danish: [ˈmiˌkʰɛˀl ˈnoˀɐ]; born 27 December 1978) is a Danish film director.

== Education and career ==
Noer studied at the European Film College and later at the National Film School of Denmark, where he graduated from the documentary programme in 2003. His 2007 documentary, Vesterbro, received a Special Mention at the Copenhagen International Documentary Festival (CPH:DOX).

Co-directing with Tobias Lindholm, Noer made his narrative feature debut with the 2010 prison drama R, which won the Bodil Award for Best Danish Film and the Robert Award for Best Danish Film and earned them the Robert Award for Best Director. He subsequently directed Northwest and Key House Mirror, which were released in 2013 and in 2015, respectively. In 2017, his first English-language film, Papillon, a remake of the 1973 film, premiered at the Toronto International Film Festival.

In 2018, Before the Frost, his fifth feature set in 19th-century rural Denmark, premiered at the Toronto International Film Festival. It also competed at the Tokyo International Film Festival, where it won the Special Jury Prize and the Award for Best Actor.

== Filmography ==
| Year | Danish title | English title | Note |
|---|---|---|---|
| 2003 | En rem af huden | Underneath the Skin | Short documentary |
| 2006 | Hawaii | | Short film co-written with Tobias Lindholm |
| 2006 | Jorden under mine fødder | The Earth Beneath My Feet | Documentary |
| 2007 | Vesterbro | | Documentary |
| 2008 | De vilde hjerter | The Wild Hearts | Documentary |
| 2010 | R | | Co–written and directed with Tobias Lindholm |
| 2010 | Son of God | | Documentary co-directed with Khavn De La Cruz |
| 2013 | Nordvest | Northwest | Co-written with Rasmus Heisterberg |
| 2015 | Nøgle hus spejl | Key House Mirror | Co-written with Anders August |
| 2017 | Papillon | | Direction only |
| 2018 | Før frosten | Before the Frost | Co-written with Jesper Fink |
| 2023 | Birthday Girl | | Co-written with Jesper Fink |
