= Pilou Asbæk =

Danish actor (born 1982)

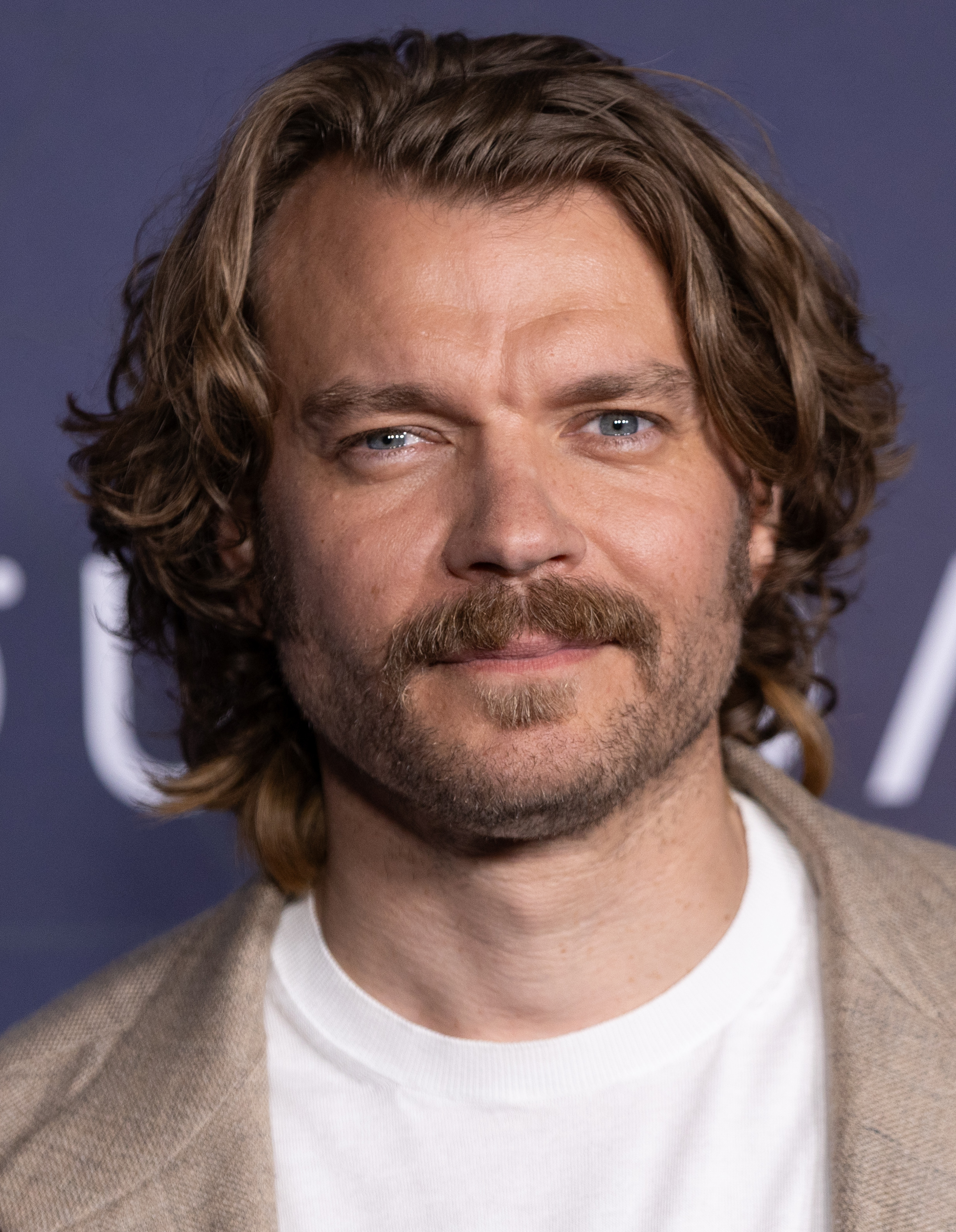
- Asbaek in 2025
- Born: Johan Philip Asbæk; 2 March 1982 (age 44); Copenhagen, Denmark
- Education: Danish National School of Performing Arts
- Occupation: Actor
- Years active: 2008–present
- Known for: Borgen; Game of Thrones; Ghost in the Shell; Foundation
- Political party: Social Democrats
- Spouse: Anna Bro
- Children: 1

Johan Philip "Pilou" Asbæk (Danish: [pʰiˈlu ˈæspek]; born 2 March 1982) is a Danish actor, best known for his role as troubled spin doctor Kasper Juul in the Danish television political drama Borgen, as Euron Greyjoy in the television series Game of Thrones, and as The Mule in Apple TV+'s adaptation of the Foundation series.

== Early life ==
Asbæk was born in Copenhagen, the son of gallery owners Maria Patricia (née Tonn) and Jacob A. Asbæk, who run Galerie Asbæk in Copenhagen. His mother was born in Casablanca, Morocco, to a Danish father and a French mother. His father is from Hammel. Asbæk has two older brothers, Thomas Asbæk, an art consultant at Asbæk Art Consulting, and Martin Asbæk, a gallery owner at Martin Asbæk Gallery.

Asbæk went to boarding school at Herlufsholm School, where he was active in drama productions. He graduated from Denmark's Danish National School of Performing Arts in the summer of 2008.

== Career ==
=== Television ===
In 2009, Asbæk played soldier David Grüner in an episode of the second season of the Danish TV series The Killing (Danish: Forbrydelsen).

From 2010 to 2013, Asbæk played spin-doctor Kasper Juul in the critically lauded Danish TV series Borgen, written by Tobias Lindholm, about the politics of a female prime minister of Denmark. Asbæk's performance was uniformly praised by critics. In 2014, the Danish public-funded DR cast Asbæk as Didrich, a landowner suffering from post-traumatic stress disorder, in a big-budget period TV series called 1864.

In 2016, Asbæk joined the HBO series Game of Thrones in Season 6 as pirate Euron Greyjoy.

He appeared as Markus on Face to Face 3 (2023).

Asbæk also portrays The Mule in Season 3 (2025) of the Apple TV+ television series Foundation. He took the role over from Mikael Persbrandt, who had portrayed The Mule briefly in flashes of premonitions in Season 2.

=== Film ===
In 2011, Asbæk starred in another piece by Tobias Lindholm, in the film R, as a Danish convict, portraying a harrowing prison experience. The film was shot in the Dogme 95–inspired style. The next year, in 2012, Asbæk starred in another Tobias Lindholm film called A Hijacking, about Somali piracy, for which he transformed himself physically, gaining weight to imbue the role with method acting.

In 2013, Asbæk portrayed a flamboyant Danish tycoon named Simon Spies in the movie Sex, Drugs & Taxation (Danish: Spies & Glistrup). In this film, Asbæk co-stars opposite his wife's cousin, the actor Nicolas Bro, who plays the other main character, Mogens Glistrup.

In 2014, Asbæk starred opposite Scarlett Johansson in the Luc Besson film Lucy. Also in 2014, Asbæk appeared in the Bille August film Silent Heart (Danish: Stille Hjerte), in which his mother-in-law, Danish actress Vigga Bro, plays the character Lisbeth.

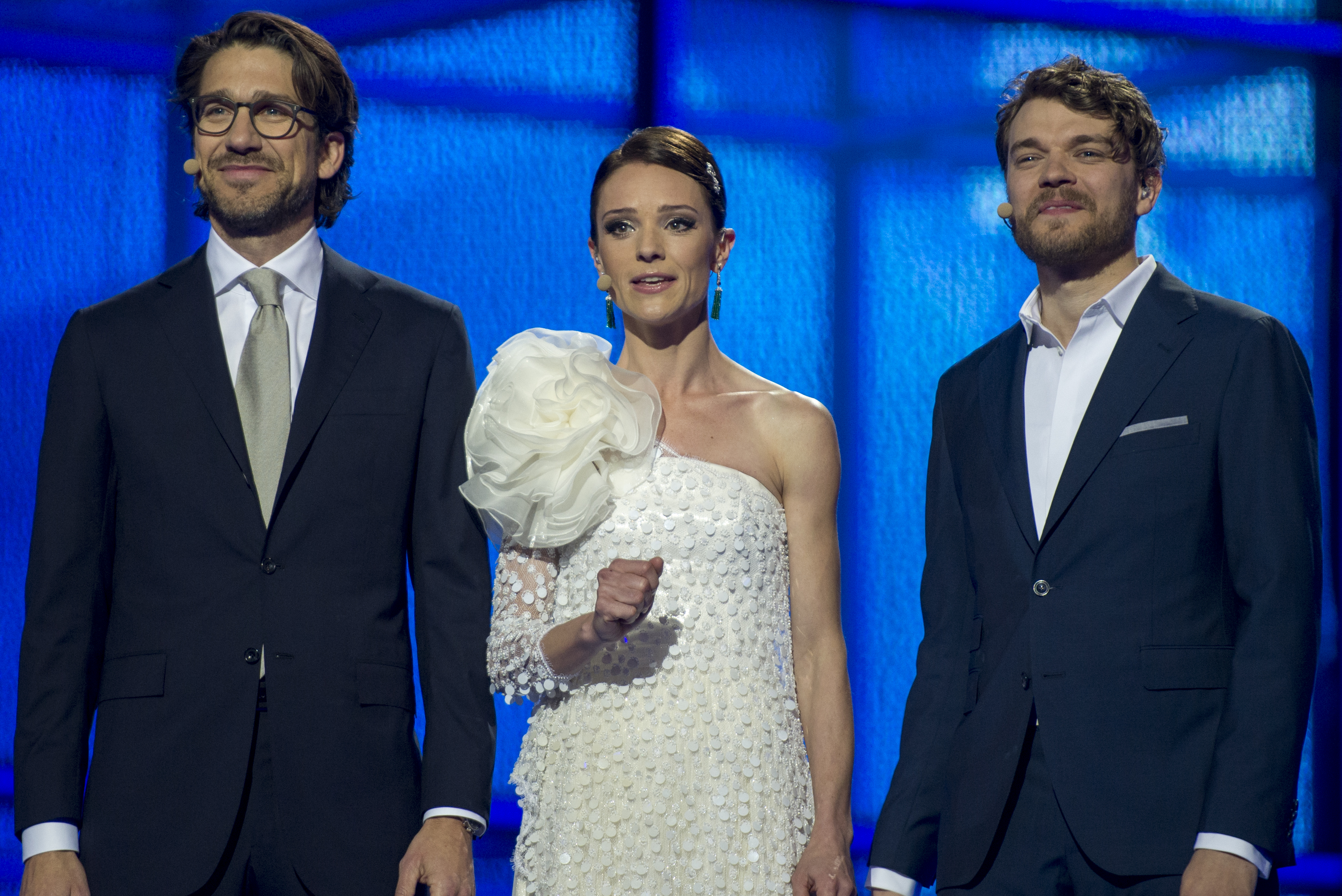
Pilou Asbæk (far right) co-hosting the Eurovision Song Contest

In 2015, Asbæk again collaborated with director Tobias Lindholm in the film A War (Danish: Krigen), playing a soldier in Afghanistan. The film premiered at the Venice Film Festival.

Asbæk co-starred in the 2016 remake of Ben-Hur, starring Jack Huston and Morgan Freeman. He portrayed Pontius Pilate.

In 2017, he played Batou in Ghost in the Shell.

In 2018, he played Captain Wafner in Overlord.

Asbæk plays the lead role as police investigator Anders Olsen in Murderous Trance, opposite Josh Lucas. Written and directed by Arto Halonen, the movie is based on actual events. The plot revolves around the bizarre case of the hypnosis murders, which took place in Copenhagen in 1951.

In April 2021, he joined the cast of the upcoming superhero film Aquaman and the Lost Kingdom as Kordax.

In September 2021, Asbæk joined the cast of the Stephen King adaptation of 'Salem's Lot as Richard Straker.

Asbæk also voiced Mario in the Danish dub of 2023's The Super Mario Bros. Movie (dubbing Chris Pratt's voice-acting role as the video game character).

=== Theater ===
- 2008: Folk og røvere i Kardemomme By – Bellevue Teatret
- 2008: Core – Det Lille Gasværk.

=== Presenting ===
On 6, 8 & 10 May 2014, Asbæk co-hosted the Eurovision Song Contest 2014 in Copenhagen, with Lise Rønne and Nikolaj Koppel. Some critics commented adversely on the obscure jokes shared by the presenters throughout the televised show.

== Personal life ==
Asbæk's wife is playwright Anna Bro, who has been his domestic partner since 2008. They have a daughter, born in 2012. Anna is the daughter of the actors Hans Henrik Clemensen and Vigga Bro and comes from an extended family of actors.

The nickname Pilou came from his mother's French ancestry and is a French version of the word "Pip." The nickname is because Asbæk was the youngest son, in French, "le plus petit" for littlest, "Little Philip." Pilou is an abbreviation of Petit Philippe.

Asbæk's godfather was the late artist Kurt Trampedach.

After having criticised what he considered too harsh refugee policies by the Danish government led by Social Democratic prime minister Mette Frederiksen, Asbæk joined the Danish Social Democratic Party in January 2022 to "speak up against it from within".

== Awards ==
- 2010: Danish Film Academy – Robert Award for Best Actor in a Leading Role for R
- 2010: Danish Film Critics Association's Bodil Awards – Bodil Award for Best Actor in a Leading Role for R
- 2011: Berlin International Film Festival – Shooting Stars Award
- 2012: Ove Sprogøe Prize.

== Filmography ==
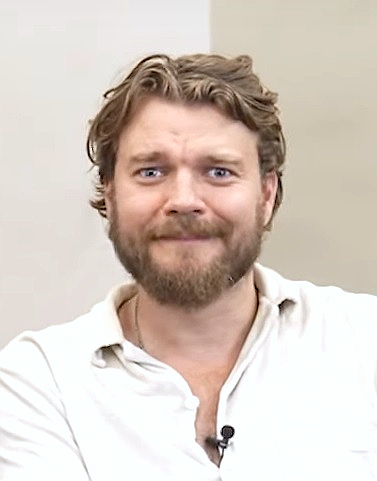
Pilou Asbæk 2023

=== Film ===
Key
†	Denotes films that have not yet been released

Year	Title	Role	Director(s)	Notes
2008	Worlds Apart	Teis	Niels Arden Oplev	
2008	Comeback	Kris	Ulrik Wivel	
2008	Crying for Love	Oliver	Christian E. Christiansen	
2009	Den Fremmede	Den Mørkhårede	Nuka Wølk Mathiassen	Short film
2009	Monsterjægerne	Søren	Martin Schmidt	
2010	R	Rune	Tobias Lindholm & Michael Noer	
2010	A Family	Peter	Pernille Fischer Christensen	
2010	Venus	Rasmus	Tor Fruergaard	Short film
2010	The Whistleblower	Bas	Larysa Kondracki	
2011	Bora Bora	Jim	Hans Fabian Wullenweber	
2012	A Hijacking	Mikkel Hartmann	Tobias Lindholm	
2013	Spies & Glistrup	Simon Spies	Christoffer Boe	
2014	Lucy	Richard	Luc Besson	
2014	Kapgang	Onkel Kristian	Niels Arden Oplev	
2014	The Absent One	Ditlev Pram	Mikkel Nørgaard	
2014	Silent Heart	Dennis	Bille August	
2015	April 9th	Sekondløjtnant Sand	Roni Ezra	
2015	A War	Claus Michael Pedersen	Tobias Lindholm	
2016	Ben-Hur	Pontius Pilate	Timur Bekmambetov	
2016	The Great Wall	Bouchard	Zhang Yimou	
2017	Ghost in the Shell	Batou	Rupert Sanders	
2017	Woodshock	Keith	Kate and Laura Mulleavy	
2018	Murderous Trance	Anders Olsen	Arto Halonen	
2018	Overlord	Wafner	Julius Avery	
2020	Run Sweetheart Run	Ethan	Shana Feste	
2021	Outside the Wire	Victor Koval	Mikael Håfström	
2022	Uncharted	Gage	Ruben Fleischer	
2022	Samaritan	Cyrus / Nemesis II	Julius Avery	
2023	I.S.S.	Alexey Pulov	Gabriela Cowperthwaite	
2023	Hidden Strike	Owen Paddock	Scott Waugh	
2023	Aquaman and the Lost Kingdom	Kordax	James Wan	
2023	Before It Ends	Jacob	Anders Walter	
2024	'Salem's Lot	Richard Straker	Gary Dauberman	
2026	No Rest for the Wicked	Helge	Kasper Kalle	
2027	The Thomas Crown Affair †	TBA	Michael B. Jordan	Post-production
2027	Blood on Snow †	TBA	Cary Joji Fukunaga	Post-production

=== Television ===
Year	Title	Role	Network	Notes
2008	Deroute	Mulvad	DR	3 episodes
2009
2009	The Killing	David Grüner	DR1	1 episode
2010	Blekingegade	Carsten Nielsen	TV 2	3 episodes
2010–2013	Borgen	Kasper Juul	DR1	29 episodes
2013	The Borgias	Paolo Orsini	bravo (Canada); Showtime (USA)	7 episodes
2014	Eurovision Song Contest 2014	Co-host	DR	With Lise Rønne and Nikolaj Koppel
2014	1864	Didrich	DR1	8 episodes
2016	Stag	Neils	BBC Two	1 episode
2016–2019	Game of Thrones	Euron Greyjoy	HBO	9 episodes
2020	The Investigation	Jakob Buch-Jepsen	TV 2 (Denmark); HBO (USA)	Miniseries
2024	Twilight of the Gods	Thor	Netflix	Voice role
2025	Foundation	The Mule	Apple TV+	10 episodes
2026	Snake Killer	Brian "Smiley" Petersen	Prime Video	4 episodes
