= Key House Mirror =

2015 film

- Directed by: Michael Noer
- Starring: Ghita Nørby; Sven Wollter
- Release date: 23 January 2015 (GIFF)
- Running time: 91 minutes
- Country: Denmark
- Language: Danish

Key House Mirror (Danish: Nøgle hus spejl) is a 2015 Danish drama film directed by Michael Noer.

== Cast ==
- Ghita Nørby - Lily
- Sven Wollter - Piloten, Erik
- Trine Pallesen - Katrine
- Marie-Louise Coninck - Tove
- Jens Brenaa - Max
