= Roland Møller =

Danish film actor (born 1972)

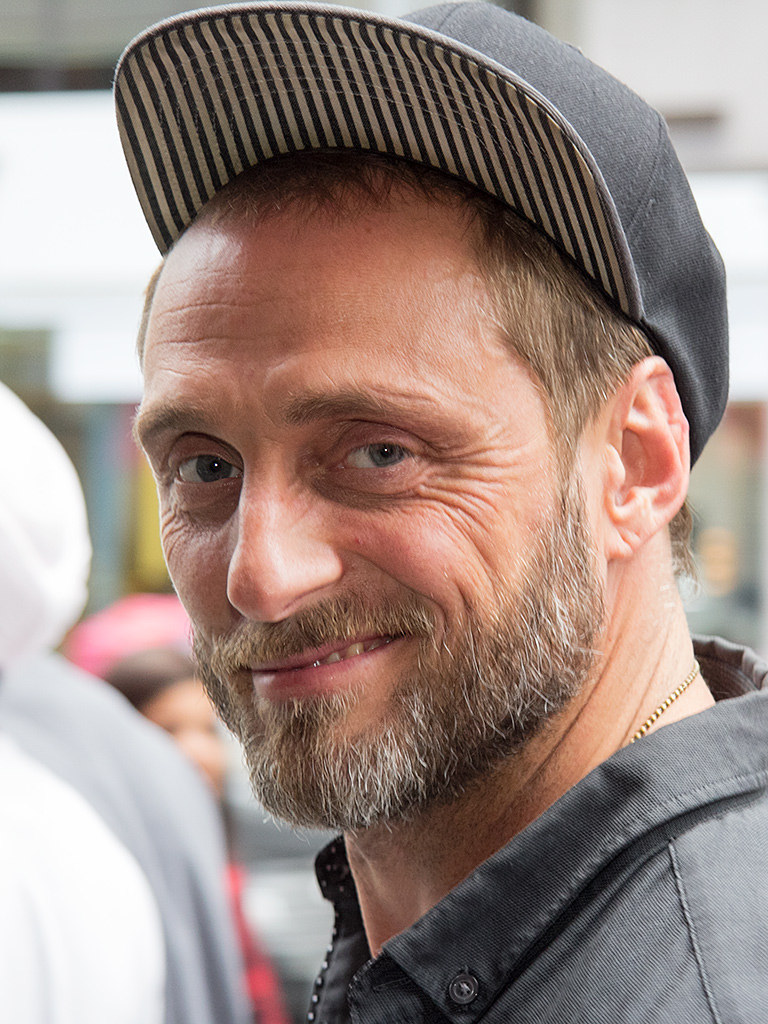
- Møller at the 2015 Toronto International Film Festival
- Born: 28 May 1972 (age 54); Odense, Denmark
- Occupation: Actor
- Years active: 2010–present

Roland Møller (Danish: [ˈʁoˀˌlænˀ ˈmølˀɐ]; born 28 May 1972) is a Danish actor. He won the Bodil Award for Best Actor in a Leading Role for Land of Mine (2015), and Best Actor in a Supporting Role for Nordvest (2013). He has appeared in high-profile films like A Hijacking, Darkland, Atomic Blonde, Papillon, and Skyscraper.

== Early life ==
Møller grew up in a criminal environment in Odense, Denmark. He had 10 assault convictions and had served time for a total of four and a half years before he was released on parole under the condition he leave Odense in 2002. He subsequently attended Den Rytmiske Højskole, a music folk high school, and then moved to Copenhagen, where he began working with the rapper Jokeren as a songwriter.

== Career ==
Møller made his acting debut in the 2010 prison drama film R. While Møller was originally involved as a consultant in the film set in Horsens State Prison, where he had served time, co-director Tobias Lindholm offered him an acting role in the film. Møller's performance in the film earned Supporting Actor nominations at the Bodil Awards and Danish Film Critics Association Awards. He then appeared in Lindholm's 2012 film A Hijacking and the 2013 film Northwest, directed by the other R co-director Michael Noer, for both of which he was nominated for the Bodil Award for Best Actor in a Supporting Role, the latter of which he also won.

In 2014, he appeared in A Second Chance. In 2015, he appeared in the war drama Land of Mine in his first leading role, for which he received the Bodil Award for Best Actor in a Leading Role.

In 2017, he appeared in the action thriller Darkland, the spy film Atomic Blonde, and the Papillon remake directed by Noer.

== Filmography ==
Year	Title	Role	Notes
2010	R	Mureren	
2012	A Hijacking	Jan Sørensen	
2013	Nordvest	Bjørn	Bodil Award for Best Actor in a Supporting Role; Nominated- Zulu Award for Best Actor
2013	A Second Chance	Man at Club	
2015	The Shamer's Daughter	Hannes	
2015	Land of Mine	Sgt. Carl Leopold Rasmussen	Bodil Award for Best Actor in a Leading Role; Tokyo International Film Award for Best Actor; Nominated- Robert Award for Best Actor in a Leading Role; Nominated- Zulu Award for Best Actor
2016	Undercover	Mick	
2017	Darkland	Claus	
2017	Atomic Blonde	Aleksander Bremovych	
2017	Papillon	Celier	
2018	The Commuter	Jackson	
2018	Skyscraper	Kores Botha	
2018	A Bluebird in My Heart	Danny	
2019	The Glass Room	Stahl	
2019	The Last Vermeer	Dekker	
2019	Valhalla	Thor	
2020	Sløborn	Magnus Fisker	The first four episodes aired on ZDF in July 2020.
2020	Riders of Justice	Kurt	
2021	Blood Red Sky	Karl	
2021	The North Water	Otto	TV drama miniseries
2022	Medieval	Tokar	
2023	Citadel	Anders Silje and Davik Silje	TV series
2026	Mutiny	Marko Madsen	
TBA	Flesh of the Gods	TBA	Post-production
