= Bremen Teater (Copenhagen) =

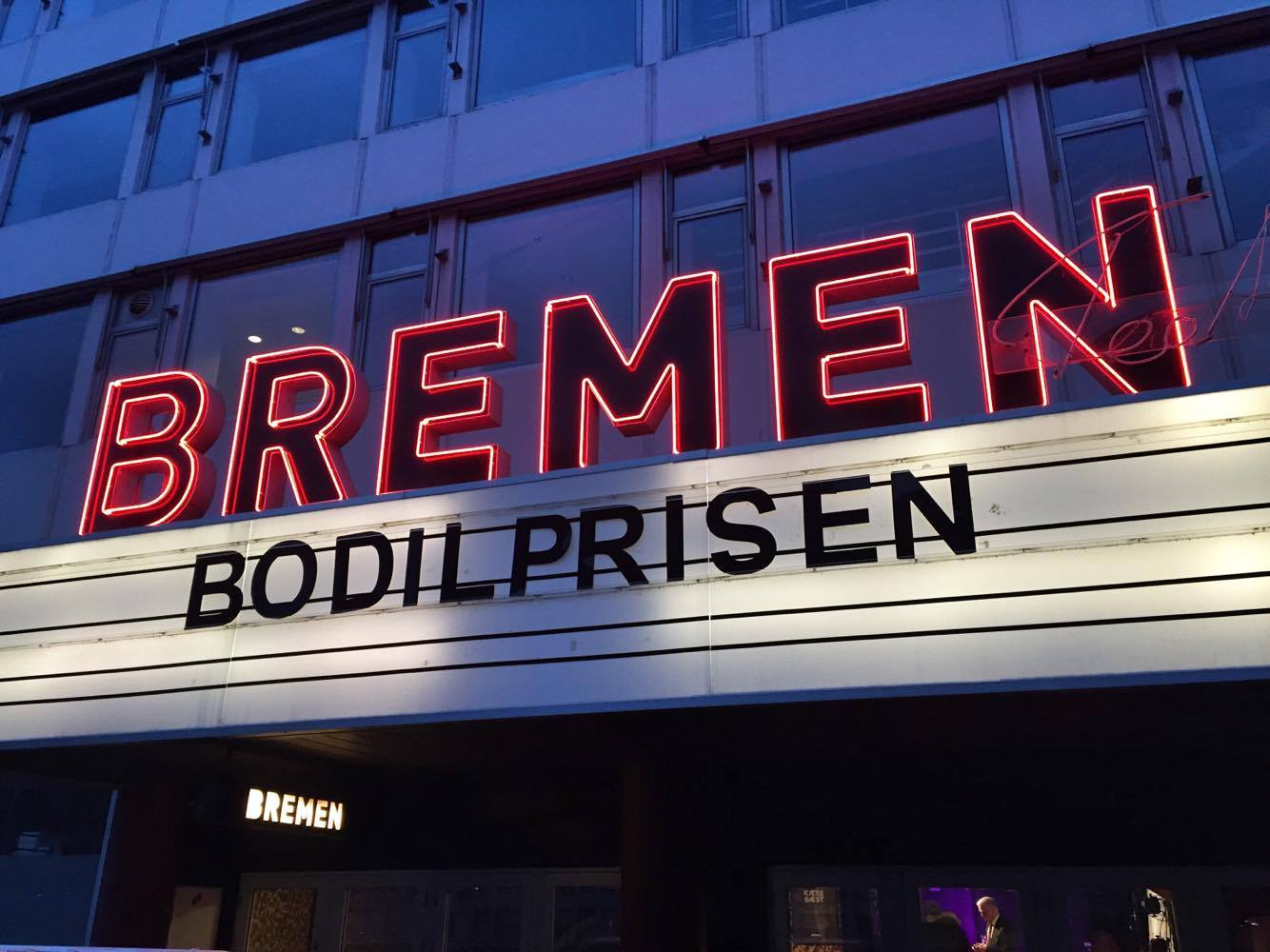
- Interactive map of Bremen Teater
- Address: Nyropsgade 39–41; Copenhagen; Denmark
- Coordinates: 55.6766°N 12.5611°E
- Type: Event venue (current)
- Capacity: 648 seats

Construction
- Opened: 2009
- Architect: Otto Frankild

Website
- www.brementeater.dk

Bremen Teater is a theatre located in central Copenhagen, Denmark. It has a seating capacity of 648 and hosts a wide range of events, including comedy performances, concerts, theatrical productions, and public talks.

== History ==
=== Mercur Theatre ===
The building, which also houses the Hotel Mercur, was completed in 1956 and designed by Danish architect Otto Frankild.

The Mercur Theatre was established in 1965 by Aage Stentoft, who served as its first theatre director. The venue hosted touring theatre companies as well as its own productions. Stentoft was later succeeded by Preben Kaas as director.

=== Simon Spies era (1971–1980) ===
In 1971, Danish travel tycoon Simon Spies—who owned the building—took over the theatre. He converted it into a combined cinema and nightclub, inaugurating it on his fiftieth birthday with a screening of the MGM film Pretty Maids All in a Row. A private elevator linked the theatre directly to Spies’s office on the first floor and his apartment on the sixth. Spies ended his involvement with the theatre in 1980.

=== Det Ny Musikteater and Privatteatret ===
The theatre was then briefly used by "Det Ny Musikteater" ("The New Music Theatre") until 1984. In 1985 it changed its name to Privat Teatret ("The Private Theatre") with Niels-Bo Valbro as theatre director. He chose to close the theatre in 2007 due to economic difficulties.

=== Bremen Teatret ===
In 2009 the venue was revived under its current name by a group of people from the Danish entertainment industry, including Casper Christensen, Frank Hvam, Simon Kvamm and Niels Hausgaard.

== Current use ==
The theatre has been known by its current name, Bremen Teater, since September 2009. For some time the theatre hosted the sketch show "Live fra Bremen" and the talk show "ALOHA!", which were both aired on TV2.

Since the opening of the theatre the list of acknowledged Danish names on the stage has included, among others, Casper Christensen & Frank Hvam, Niels Hausgaard, Simon Kvamm, Mew, Vi Sidder Bare Her and Anders & Peter Lund Madsen. The theatre has for several years been the selected venue for established award shows and film screenings in both the movie and music industries, hosting events such as Steppeulven, Bodil Awards, GAFFA Awards and CPH:DOX. In addition, Bremen Teater has had a number of international names on the stage, such as Laurie Anderson, David Cross, Bill Burr and Henry Rollins.

The variety of events at Bremen Teater includes comedy, theatre, concerts, award shows, film screenings, parties, talks, conferences and many others. In September 2012 the theatre opened a bar called Natbar, which won the reputable Politiken "Ibyen Award 2012" for bar of the year. Natbar has since established itself as a significant part of Copenhagen night life.

Day-to-day management of the theatre was, until summer 2013, operated by Mai Manaa Kristensen, Morten Manaa Kristensen and Nynne Mee Pilgaard. Today, the managing director of Bremen Teater is Jesper Majdall and day-to-day manager is Søren Hvidt.
