= R (film) =

2010 film

- Theatrical poster
- R
- Directed by: Tobias Lindholm; Michael Noer
- Written by: Michael Noer; Tobias Lindholm
- Produced by: René Ezra; Tomas Radoor
- Starring: Pilou Asbæk
- Cinematography: Magnus Nordenhof Jønck
- Edited by: Adam Nielsen
- Production company: Nordisk Film
- Distributed by: Nordisk Film Biografdistribution
- Release dates: 27 January 2010 (IFFR); 22 April 2010
- Running time: 99 minutes
- Country: Denmark
- Languages: Danish; Arabic
- Budget: DKK 4,755,000

R is a 2010 Danish prison drama film written and directed by Tobias Lindholm and Michael Noer, and starring Pilou Asbæk. The film was produced by Nordisk Film. The film follows Rune Pedersen (Pilou Asbæk), who is serving a prison sentence of two years in Horsens State Prison. Here he is set to do the dirty work of distributing drugs between departments.

The film premiered at the 2010 International Film Festival Rotterdam, and was released in Denmark on 22 April 2010.

== Cast ==
- Pilou Asbæk as Rune
- Dulfi Al-Jabouri as Rashid
- Roland Møller as Mureren
- Jacob Gredsted as Carsten
- Omar Shargawi as Bazhir

== Reception ==
On review aggregator website Rotten Tomatoes, the film holds an approval rating of 91% based on 11 reviews, with an average rating of 7.4/10.

== Accolades ==
The film won the Bodil Award for Best Danish Film in 2011. Asbæk received a Bodil Award for Best Actor in a Leading Role for his performance as Rune. The director Tobias Lindholm scored a Bodil Honorary Award for his films Submarino and R. The film won the Robert Award for Best Danish Film the same year.
