= A War =

2015 film by Tobias Lindholm

A War (Danish film)
- Film poster
- Directed by: Tobias Lindholm
- Written by: Tobias Lindholm
- Produced by: René Ezra; Tomas Radoor
- Starring: Pilou Asbæk; Tuva Novotny; Søren Malling
- Cinematography: Magnus Nordenhof Jønck
- Edited by: Adam Nielsen
- Music by: Sune Rose Wagner
- Production companies: AZ Celtic Films; Nordisk Film Production
- Distributed by: Nordisk Film Distribution
- Release date: 27 August 2015
- Running time: 115 minutes
- Country: Denmark
- Language: Danish
- Budget: 8 million Danish krone; (USD$1.2 million)
- Box office: $880,073

A War (Danish: Krigen) is a 2015 Danish war drama film written and directed by Tobias Lindholm, and starring Pilou Asbæk, Tuva Novotny and Søren Malling. It tells the story of a Danish military company in Afghanistan that is fighting the Taliban while trying to protect the civilians, and how the commander is accused of having committed a war crime. The film was nominated for the Best Foreign Language Film at the 88th Academy Awards.

== Plot ==
A Danish soldier in a squad patrolling Helmand province sets off an IED. He dies from horrific injuries while his commander, Claus, back at base camp can do little to help. After that, Claus resolves to join his men on every patrol. After treating an injured little girl, her family comes to the base because the Taliban has threatened to kill them for asking the Danes for help. Claus sends them back to their village.

Meanwhile, back in Denmark, Claus' wife, Maria, is trying to hold everyday life together, with a husband at war and three children missing their father. The strain their father's absence takes on the family is seen as the burdens of parenting fall solely on Maria.

The next day, Claus and his men return to the village to find that the Afghan family they had helped has been murdered. Then without warning, an ambush by insurgent forces ensues. Claus, in the confusion of battle, calls in an airstrike on a nearby compound, though he knows he lacks proper identification of a legitimate target, known as personnel identification (PID) of the enemy. This allows the Danish troops to retreat without loss of life. However, Claus is charged with the killing of 11 innocent civilians and sent home. The potential consequences of these accusations shake him and his family. Claus' defense lawyer asserts that he needs to claim that he had PID in order to avoid prison. Though he plans to admit his guilt, Maria angrily admonishes him for not thinking of his children's lives without a father. He decides to claim he called in an airstrike because he had PID.

Evidence against him mounts as Claus' men testify in court. His close friend and comrade, who had known him since boot camp, testifies that Claus, despite being a good officer, was feeling the strain of leadership and making rash decisions. In the witness box, Claus maintains his position. After being probed by the prosecution, he angrily declares that those who have not been in combat cannot understand what it takes to make life and death decisions. Unexpectedly, Claus' former radio operator testifies that he identified muzzle flashes in the compound, giving Claus a plausible reason to call the airstrike. Though this evidence is dubious, it is enough to convince the judge and sub-committee that Claus had legitimate PID.

Later while tucking his young son into bed, Claus notices how his son's feet resemble those of the murdered little girl in Helmand. He sits alone outside, looking at the night sky.

== Cast ==
- Pilou Asbæk as Claus Michael Pedersen
- Tuva Novotny as Maria Pedersen
- Søren Malling as Martin R. Olsen
- Dar Salim as Najib Bisma
- Charlotte Munck as Lisbeth Danning
- Dulfi Al-Jabouri as Lutfi "Lasse" Hassan

== Production ==
The film was produced by Nordisk Film with support from DR TV and received eight million Danish kroner from the Danish Film Institute. Filming took place in Copenhagen, in Konya, Turkey and in Almería, Spain. It ended in January 2015. With the exception of the main characters, the soldiers are played by actual Danish soldiers who had served in Afghanistan.

== Reception ==
A War received critical acclaim. On Rotten Tomatoes, the film has a 91% score based on 93 reviews, with an average rating of 7.84/10. The site's consensus states: "Tense, intelligent, and refreshingly low-key, A War is part frontline thriller, part courtroom drama -- and eminently effective in both regards." Metacritic reports an 81 out of 100 rating based on 29 critics.

Olly Richards from Empire gave the film four out of five saying "It's a riveting, complex film that asks one simple question: what do you do when there's no right answer?". Clayton Dillard from Slant magazine gave it a mixed review and a score of two out of four, writing "Tobias Lindholm stages his claims through clunky dramaturgical scenarios, with the seams exposed at every turn."

== See also ==
- List of submissions to the 88th Academy Awards for Best Foreign Language Film
- List of Danish submissions for the Academy Award for Best Foreign Language Film
