= A Hijacking =

2012 film

- Theatrical release poster
- Directed by: Tobias Lindholm
- Written by: Tobias Lindholm
- Produced by: Rene Ezra; Tomas Radoor
- Starring: Søren Malling; Pilou Asbæk; Dar Salim; Roland Møller
- Cinematography: Magnus Nordenhof Jønck
- Edited by: Adam Nielsen
- Music by: Hildur Guðnadóttir
- Release dates: 3 September 2012 (Venice); 20 September 2012 (Denmark)
- Running time: 99 minutes
- Country: Denmark
- Languages: Danish; English
- Budget: DKK 15 million (approx. $2.6 million)
- Box office: $2.69 million

A Hijacking (Danish: Kapringen) is a 2012 Danish thriller film written and directed by Tobias Lindholm about a ship hijacking. Pilou Asbæk and Søren Malling star as a cook taken hostage and the CEO that attempts to negotiate for his release, respectively. It premiered at the 69th Venice International Film Festival.

== Plot ==
Mikkel Hartmann, cook on board the Danish merchant ship Rozen, is anxious to return to his wife and child. Jan Sørensen, the ship's engineer, asks him to take a letter home to his family. Back in Denmark, shipping company representative Lars Vestergaard, unable to close a difficult deal, requests help from CEO Peter Ludvigsen, who concludes the deal with the Japanese businessmen. Ludvigsen suddenly learns that pirates in the Indian Ocean have hijacked the Rozen. On the ship, the crew is separated into two groups, and Hartmann is forced at gunpoint to cook a meal. Automatic gunfire punctuates the night, frightening the hostages and keeping the atmosphere tense.

Ludvigsen hires Connor Julian, an Australian hostage negotiator who has experience with pirates. Julian's first suggestion is to use a neutral third party for negotiations, but Ludvigsen insists on running negotiations himself. Their first communication with the pirates comes when Omar, a Somali who says that he is a translator taken hostage by the pirates, asks Hartmann to contact Ludvigsen. Ludvigsen, however, refuses to negotiate through Hartmann and hangs up. Omar himself then calls and relays the pirates' demands. Ludvigsen's counter-offer, an unrealistic low-ball number, opens the negotiation process. Julian explains that if they give in too quickly or easily, the pirates will only renege on the deal.

As the weeks roll on, the pirates allow the hostages limited privileges, such as use of the bathrooms. Hartmann and Sørensen attempt to befriend one of the pirates, who humiliates Sørensen as a prank. When Hartmann becomes agitated over the dwindling supplies, Omar refuses to restock the vessel and forces Hartmann to call Ludvigsen. Ludvigsen again refuses to communicate through Hartmann and hangs up. Negotiations slowly continue, and Omar reacts incredulously to Ludvigsen's continued low-ball offers, which he says will result in the deaths of himself and the crew unless Ludvigsen makes a realistic offer. The situation takes a toll on Ludvigsen, culminating in his yelling at his worried girlfriend.

The pirates allow the hostages on deck, and Hartmann catches a large fish; the hostages and pirates celebrate and later sing sea shanties. Hartmann reveals that it is his daughter's birthday, and all sing "Happy Birthday to You". Omar later allows Hartmann to call his wife, Maria, but a pirate cuts the conversation short. Omar demands that Maria put pressure on Ludvigsen to pay. Against Julian's advice, Ludvigsen makes a slightly higher offer and loses his cool. Insulted by the offer, Omar insists that the pirates will soon begin to kill people, and a gunshot is heard as the connection goes dead. Stunned, Ludvigsen begins to wonder if he is responsible for Hartmann's death.

The board begins to grow impatient with Ludvigsen's protracted negotiations, and they threaten to replace him with a hired negotiator if he cannot close a deal by the end of the month. After a period of silence, Ludvigsen receives a fax from the pirates. Ludvigsen requests proof that Hartmann is still alive, which Sørensen provides. However, Hartmann is subject to poor treatment and psychological abuse that leaves him an emotional wreck. As negotiations restart, Ludvigsen offers $2.8 million. Omar rejects the offer, and Vestergaard suggests that Ludvigsen pretend to add $500,000 of his own money. Tired of negotiating and convinced that the company cannot offer any more, Omar accepts.

On the ship, Omar herds the hostages on to the deck, where the two separated groups see each other again for the first time. An airplane circles several times and drops a package. The pirates react joyously as they retrieve it. Thankful that the ordeal has finally come to an end, Hartmann retrieves his wedding ring, which he had hidden when the pirates boarded the vessel, and wears it publicly again. As the pirates disembark, one grabs Hartmann's ring. When Hartmann protests, the captain intervenes and takes back the ring from the pirate. Angry, the pirate shoots and kills the captain. Omar strikes the pirate and chastises him, while Sørensen is crying over the captain. Back in Denmark, Ludvigsen makes a difficult phonecall to deliver the bad news to the captain's wife. Shocked by his traumatic experiences, Hartmann does not show much emotion when he finally is re-united with his family.

== Cast ==
- Pilou Asbæk as Mikkel Hartmann
- Søren Malling as Peter C. Ludvigsen
- Dar Salim as Lars Vestergaard
- Roland Møller as Jan Sørensen
- Gary Skjoldmose Porter as Connor Julian
- Abdihakin Asgar as Omar
- Keith Pearson as the captain
- Amalie Ihle Alstrup as Maria Hartmann
- Claus Friis as Journalist

== Production ==
Asbæk and Malling were cast before writing began; writer-director Lindholm had worked with them earlier and enjoyed their company. He wanted to write a film about a ship that encounters trouble at sea, but could not think of a good plot. When he read about commercial Danish ships hijacked by pirates in the Indian Ocean, he realized that he could use this situation for his film.

The film was shot on location and used a real ship. The crew of the ship, who worked as extras, had been hijacked in the past, and they contributed details to the script, such as separating the crew. In order to prevent a real-life hijacking, armed guards were hired to protect the production. The pirates were cast in Mombassa, Kenya. Lindholm requested permission from clan elders for casting and was surprised when they suggested that the pirates be written negatively; the elders said that the pirates were recruiting many young men, and it was difficult to dissuade youths from joining.

The cast was a mix of professional and first-time actors. During shooting, Lindholm kept Malling, an experienced comedian, off-balance by refusing to allow him to fall back to comedy. Porter is a professional hostage negotiator, originally hired as the film's technical adviser but then offered the part: he had no lines written for him, as Lindholm wanted to make use of his real-life skills. Abdihakin, the only ethnic Somali in the cast, was cast for his distinctive appearance. Also a first-time actor, he educated himself through watching behind-the-scenes documentaries on famous films, which he often referenced during shooting. In order to keep the pirates alien and threatening, their dialogue was not subtitled. Lindholm at first worried that there might be too much English-language dialogue in the film for the Danish market, but, in the interests of realism, he kept it. This had the unintended effect of making the film an easier sell internationally.

== Release ==
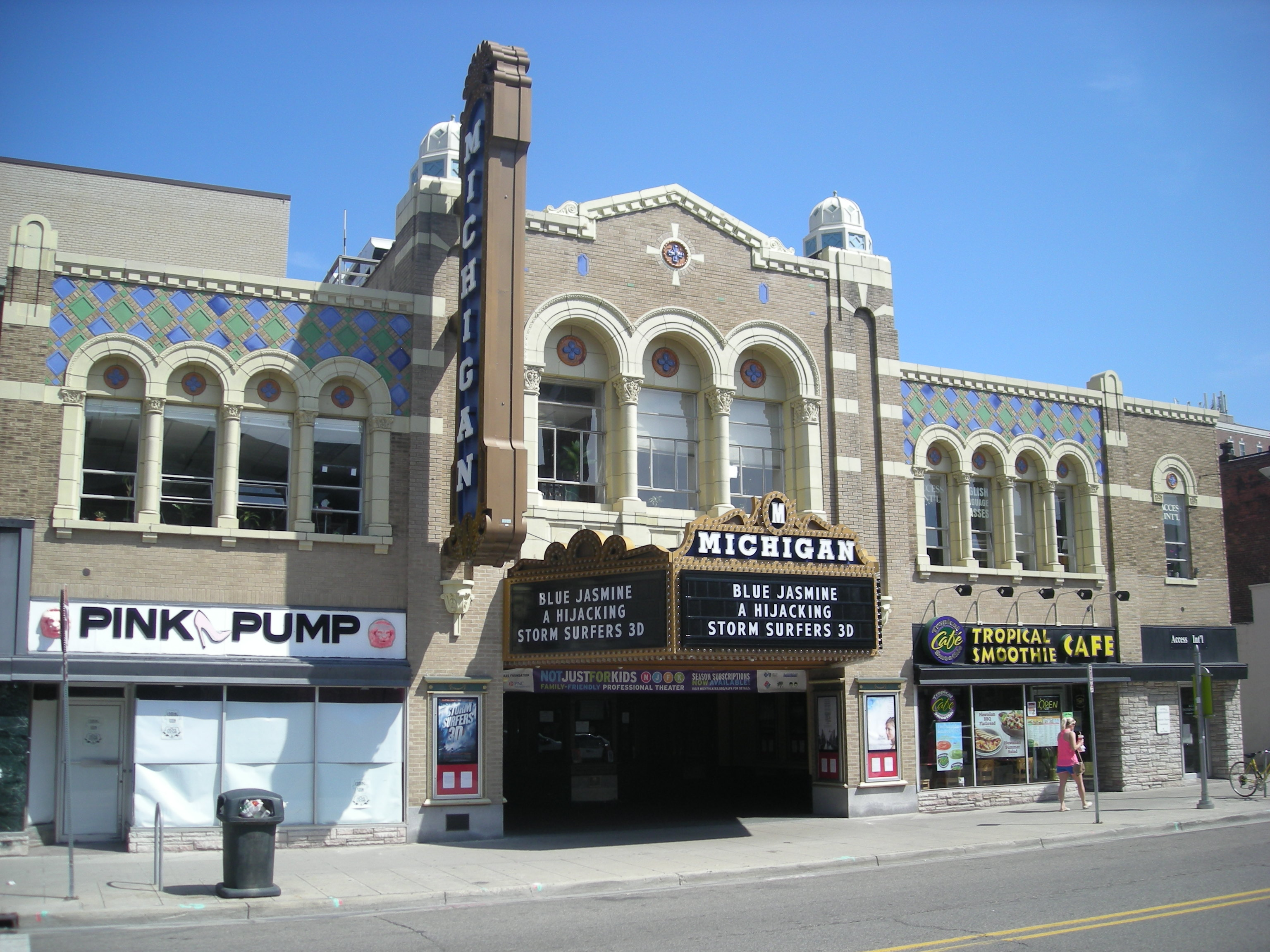
A Hijacking playing at the Michigan Theater in Ann Arbor, Michigan

A Hijacking premiered at the 69th Venice International Film Festival. It opened in Denmark on 20 September 2012, where it grossed $1.6 million.

== Reception ==
Rotten Tomatoes, a review aggregator, reports that 95% of 108 surveyed critics gave the film a positive review; the average rating was 7.9/10. The site's consensus reads: "A tense, gripping thriller, A Hijacking avoids action movie cliches and instead creates a palpable sense of dread by mixing gritty realism with atmospheric beauty." Metacritic rated it 82/100 based on 26 reviews. Geoff Pevere of The Globe and Mail praised the film for its ability to avoid "conventional thrills" without compromising its suspense. Mick LaSalle of the San Francisco Chronicle called it a "methodical and tense" character study.

== See also ==
- Captain Phillips, a 2013 American action thriller film about the Mærsk Alabama hijacking
- Pirates of the 20th Century, a 1979 Soviet action/adventure film about modern piracy
- Survival film, about the film genre, with a list of related films
