= Tobias Lindholm =

Danish screenwriter and film director

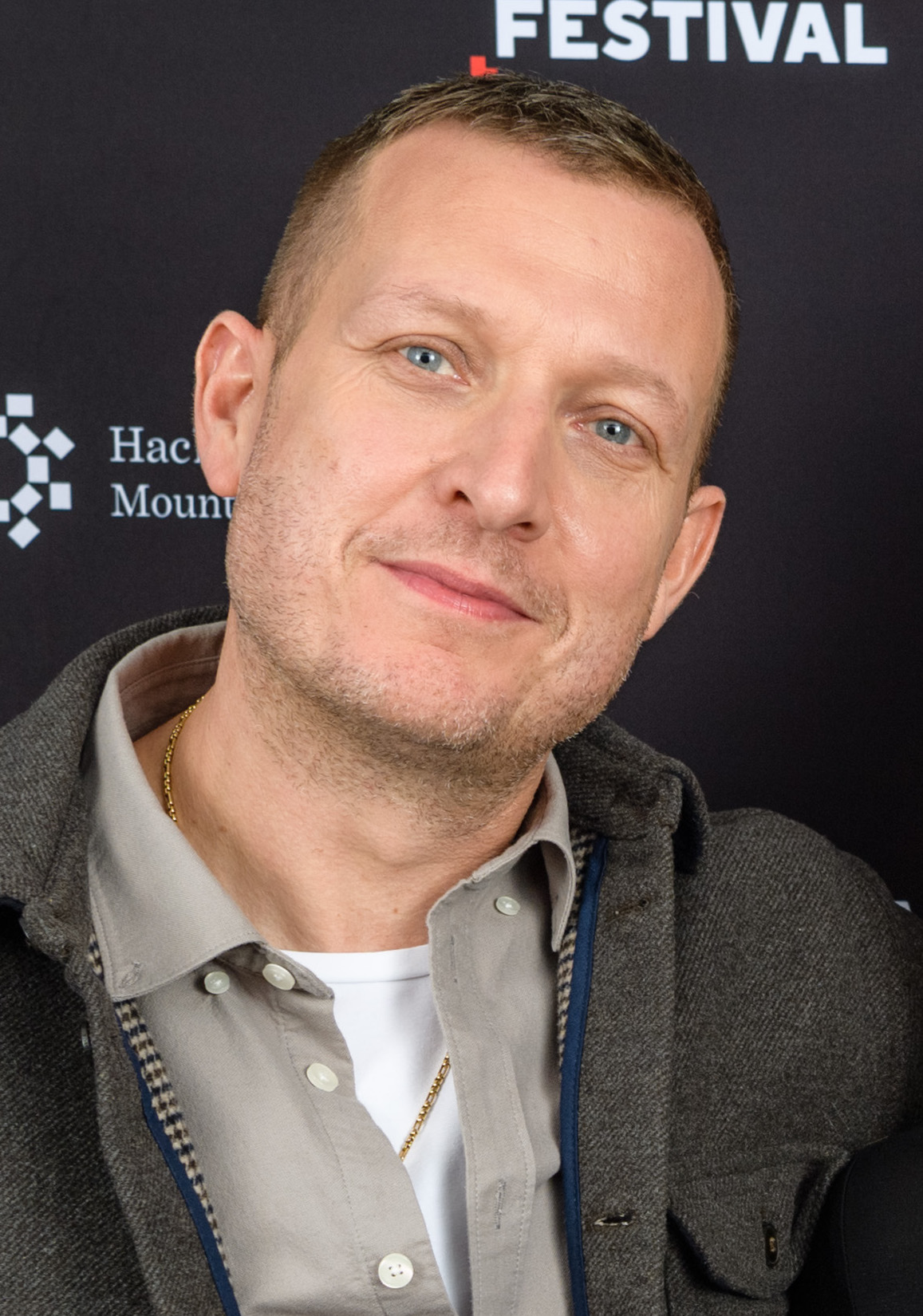
- Lindholm at the 2022 Montclair Film Festival
- Born: Næstved, Denmark
- Education: National Film School of Denmark
- Occupations: Screenwriter; Film director
- Years active: 2007–present
- Spouse: Caroline Blanco
- Children: 3

Tobias Lindholm is a Danish screenwriter and film director. He has written for many films and TV series, becoming known as a writer on the political drama series Borgen. His 2015 film A War was nominated for an Academy Award for Best Foreign Language Film. He is also known for directing the films R (2010), A Hijacking (2012), and The Good Nurse (2022).

== Early life and education ==
Tobias Lindholm was born in Næstved, Denmark.

He graduated from the National Film School of Denmark in Copenhagen in 2007.

== Career ==
Lindholm first received attention for his work as a television writer on the popular Danish political drama TV series Borgen (2010–2022), credited on all 20 episodes of the series' first two seasons, either as an episode writer or storyline contributor. In 2011, Lindholm was awarded a special Bodil Award for having two feature films, Submarino (as co-writer) and R (as director and writer) in competition for that year's Best Danish Film, which the latter movie also won.

His hostage drama A Hijacking premiered at the 2012 Venice Film Festival in the Orizzonti section.

Lindholm has been a frequent collaborator with film director Thomas Vinterberg, with whom he has written the screenplays for feature films Submarino (2010), The Hunt (2012), and Another Round (2020).

Lindholm directed the 2015 drama A War (Danish: Krigen) about a Danish military company in Afghanistan that is captured by the Taliban, and the commander is accused of war crimes. The film was nominated for the Best Foreign Language Film at the 88th Academy Awards.

In November 2021, Lindholm struck a first-look deal with global media company Sister, to develop and produce scripted series. The first project, called The Best of Us, is a dramatisation of 9/11 first responders, with Jeremy Strong set to star in it.

In 2025, it was announced that Lindholm co-wrote Torpedo, a new Danish crime thriller, along with director Frederik Louis Hviid.

== Personal life ==
Lindholm married film producer Caroline Blanco, with whom he has three sons. As of 2015 they were living in Copenhagen.

== Filmography ==
Film

Year	Title	Director	Writer
2010	R	Yes	Yes
2010	Submarino	No	Yes
2012	The Hunt	No	Yes
2012	A Hijacking	Yes	Yes
2013	The Hour of the Lynx	No	Yes
2015	April 9th	No	Yes
2015	A War	Yes	Yes
2016	The Commune	No	Yes
2020	Another Round	No	Yes
2022	The Good Nurse	Yes	No

Documentary film

Year	Title	Director	Writer
2013	Venice 70: Future Reloaded	Yes	No
2014	The Arms Drop	No	Yes

Television

Year	Title	Director	Writer	Notes
2008	Sommer	No	Yes	3 episodes
2010-2011	Borgen	No	Yes	20 episodes
2016	Follow the Money	No	Yes	2 episodes
2017	Mindhunter	Yes	No	"Episode 5" and "Episode 6"
2020	The Investigation	Yes	Yes	6 episodes
2027	The Best of Us	Yes	Yes	6 episodes
