= List of Danish submissions for the Academy Award for Best International Feature Film =

Best International Feature Film submissions from Denmark

Highlights
- Debut: 1956
- Submissions: 64
- Nominations: 15
- Oscar winners: 4

Denmark has submitted fifty-nine films for consideration for the Academy Award for Best International Feature Film since the inaugural award in 1956. (Note: The category was previously named the Academy Award for Best Foreign Language Film, but this was changed to the Academy Award for Best International Feature Film in April 2019, after the Academy deemed the word "Foreign" to be outdated.) The official Danish submission is selected annually in late summer by the Danish Film Institute.

As of 2026, Denmark won four times, for: Babette's Feast (1987), Pelle the Conqueror (1988), In a Better World (2010) and Another Round (2020).

== Submissions ==
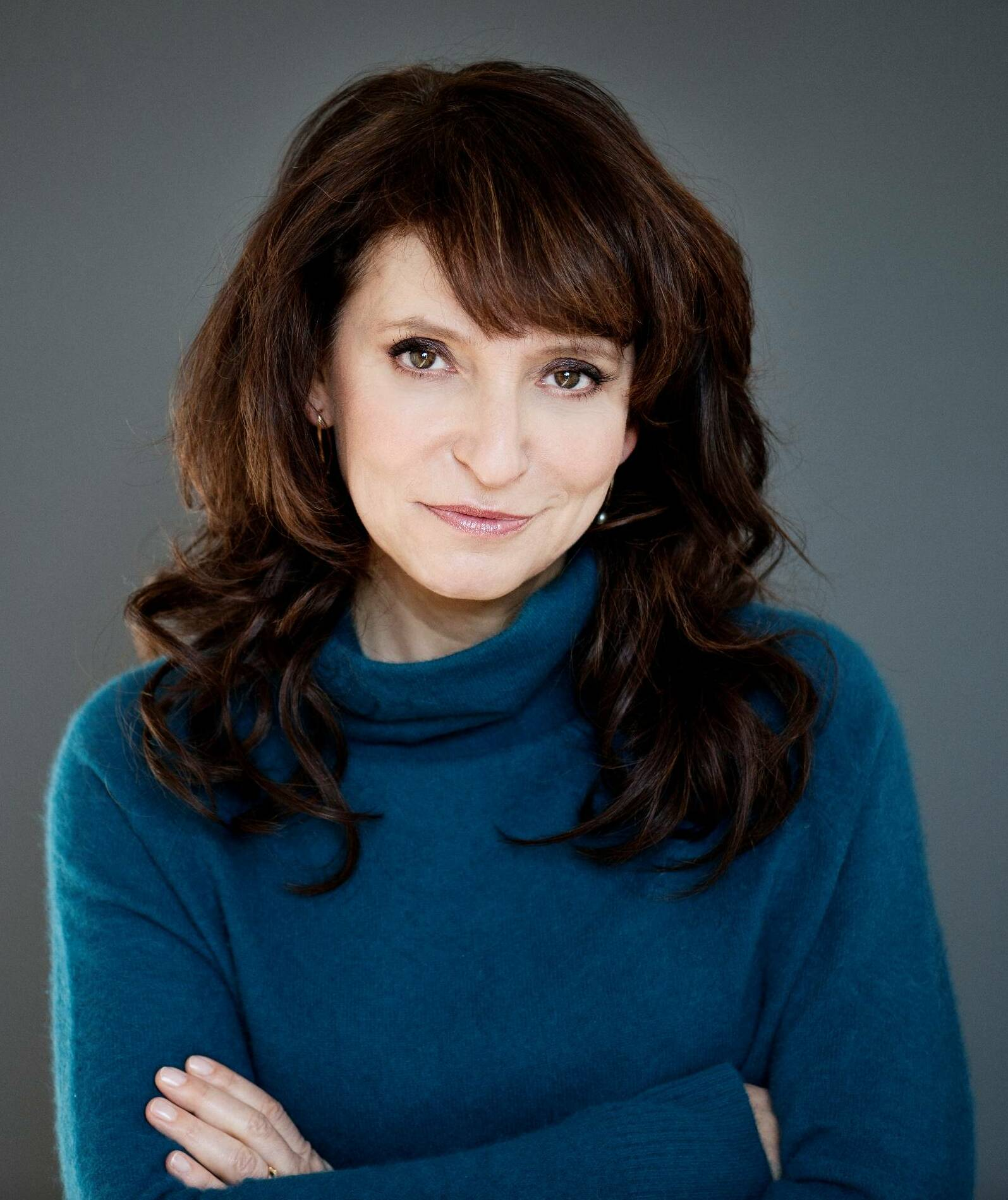
Susanne Bier was the first Danish woman to win the award, for In a Better World (2010)

The Academy of Motion Picture Arts and Sciences has invited the film industries of various countries to submit their best film for the Academy Award for Best International Feature Film since 1956. The International Feature Film Committee oversees the process and reviews all the submitted films. Following this, they vote via secret ballot to determine the five nominees for the award.

In 1957, Denmark became the first country to send a film with a female director to the Foreign Oscar competition with Annelise Hovmand's Be Dear to Me. Two years later, Astrid Henning-Jensen's Paw became to the first film directed by a woman to receive a nomination in the category.

Between 1998 and 2002, four out of five Danish submissions were made according to the austere Dogme 95 movement principles. None were nominated and none have been submitted since.

Besides the four wins, fifteen films also succeeded in getting nominations: Qivitoq (1958), Paw (1959), Harry and the Butler (1960), Waltzing Regitze (1989), After the Wedding (2006), A Royal Affair (2012), The Hunt (2013), A War (2015), Land of Mine (2016), Flee (2021) and The Girl with the Needle (2024).

Flee (2021), directed by Jonas Poher Rasmussen, was also nominated in the Best Documentary Feature and Best Animated Feature categories, becoming the first film ever to be nominated in all three of those categories.

SuperClásico (2011), The Guilty (2018), Holy Spider (2022), and The Promised Land (2023), all advanced to the December shortlist, but were not nominated.

Mr Nobody Against Putin (2025), won the Academy Award for Best Documentary Feature Film despite not being nominated for the Best International Feature Film category.

Below is a list of the films that have been submitted by Denmark for review by the Academy for the award by year.

Year (Ceremony)	Film title used in nomination	Original title	Director	Result
1956 (29th)	Qivitoq		Erik Balling	Nominated
1957 (30th)	Be Dear to Me	Ingen tid til kærtegn	Annelise Hovmand	Not nominated
1958 (31st)	The Girls Are Willing	Guld og grønne skove	Gabriel Axel	Not nominated
1959 (32nd)	Paw		Astrid Henning-Jensen	Nominated
1961 (34th)	Harry and the Butler	Harry og Kammertjeneren	Bent Christensen	Nominated
1964 (37th)	Sextet	Sekstet	Annelise Hovmand	Not nominated
1965 (38th)	Gertrud		Carl Theodor Dreyer	Not nominated
1966 (39th)	Hunger	Sult	Henning Carlsen	Not nominated
1967 (40th)	Once There Was a War	Der var engang en krig	Palle Kjærulff-Schmidt	Not nominated
1968 (41st)	People Meet and Sweet Music Fills the Heart	Människor möts och ljuv musik uppstår i hjärtat	Henning Carlsen	Not nominated
1969 (42nd)	Ballad of Carl-Henning	Balladen om Carl-Henning	Lene Grønlykke, Sven Grønlykke	Not nominated
1970 (43rd)	Re: Lone	Ang. Lone	Franz Ernst	Not nominated
1971 (44th)	The Missing Clerk	Den forsvundne fuldmægtig	Gert Fredholm	Not nominated
1972 (45th)	Oh, to Be on the Bandwagon!	Man sku' være noget ved musikken	Henning Carlsen	Not nominated
1974 (47th)	The Olsen Gang's Last Escapade	Olsen-bandens sidste bedrifter	Erik Balling	Not nominated
1975 (48th)	Per		Hans Kristensen	Not nominated
1976 (49th)	The Olsen Gang Sees Red	Olsen-banden ser rødt	Erik Balling	Not nominated
1977 (50th)	Boys	Drenge	Nils Malmros	Not nominated
1978 (51st)	Me and Charly	Mig og Charly	Morten Arnfred, Henning Kristiansen	Not nominated
1979 (52nd)	Johnny Larsen	Johnny Larsen	Morten Arnfred	Not nominated
1982 (55th)	Tree of Knowledge	Kundskabens Træ	Nils Malmros	Not nominated
1983 (56th)	Zappa		Bille August	Not nominated
1984 (57th)	Tukuma		Palle Kjærulff-Schmidt	Not nominated
1985 (58th)	Twist and Shout	Tro, håb og kærlighed	Bille August	Not nominated
1986 (59th)	The Dark Side of the Moon	Manden i Månen	Erik Clausen	Not nominated
1987 (60th)	Babette's Feast	Babettes Gæstebud	Gabriel Axel	Won Academy Award
1988 (61st)	Pelle the Conqueror (Note: Pelle the Conqueror was also nominated for the Academy Award for Best Actor for Max von Sydow.)	Pelle Erobreren	Bille August	Won Academy Award
1989 (62nd)	Memories of a Marriage	Dansen med Regitze	Kaspar Rostrup	Nominated
1990 (63rd)	Dance of the Polar Bears	Lad isbjørnene danse	Birger Larsen	Not nominated
1991 (64th)	The Great Day on the Beach	Den Store Badedag	Stellan Olsson	Not nominated
1992 (65h)	Sofie		Liv Ullmann	Not nominated
1993 (66th)	Black Harvest	Sort Høst	Anders Refn	Not nominated
1994 (67th)	Carl, My Childhood Symphony	Min fynske barndom	Erik Clausen	Not nominated
1996 (69th)	Hamsun		Jan Troell	Not nominated
1997 (70th)	Barbara		Nils Malmros	Not nominated
1998 (71st)	The Celebration	Festen	Thomas Vinterberg	Not nominated
1999 (72nd)	Mifune's Last Song	Mifunes sidste sang	Søren Kragh-Jacobsen	Not nominated
2000 (73rd)	A Place Nearby	Her i Nærheden	Kaspar Rostrup	Not nominated
2001 (74th)	Italian for Beginners	Italiensk for begyndere	Lone Scherfig	Not nominated
2002 (75th)	Open Hearts	Elsker dig for evigt	Susanne Bier	Not nominated
2003 (76th)	Reconstruction		Christoffer Boe	Not nominated
2004 (77th)	The Five Obstructions	De Fem Benspænd	Lars von Trier, Jørgen Leth	Not nominated
2005 (78th)	Adam's Apples	Adams Æbler	Anders Thomas Jensen	Not nominated
2006 (79th)	After the Wedding	Efter Brylluppet	Susanne Bier	Nominated
2007 (80th)	The Art of Crying	Kunsten at græde i Kor	Peter Schønau Fog	Not nominated
2008 (81st)	Worlds Apart	To verdener	Niels Arden Oplev	Not nominated
2009 (82nd)	Terribly Happy	Frygtelig lykkelig	Henrik Ruben Genz	Not nominated
2010 (83rd)	In a Better World	Hævnen	Susanne Bier	Won Academy Award
2011 (84th)	SuperClásico		Ole Christian Madsen	Made shortlist
2012 (85th)	A Royal Affair	En kongelig affære	Nikolaj Arcel	Nominated
2013 (86th)	The Hunt	Jagten	Thomas Vinterberg	Nominated
2014 (87th)	Sorrow and Joy	Sorg og glæde	Nils Malmros	Not nominated
2015 (88th)	A War	Krigen	Tobias Lindholm	Nominated
2016 (89th)	Land of Mine	Under sandet	Martin Zandvliet	Nominated
2017 (90th)	You Disappear	Du forsvinder	Peter Schønau Fog	Not nominated
2018 (91st)	The Guilty	Den skyldige	Gustav Möller	Made shortlist
2019 (92nd)	Queen of Hearts	Dronningen	May el-Toukhy	Not nominated
2020 (93rd)	Another Round	Druk	Thomas Vinterberg	Won Academy Award
2021 (94th)	Flee (Note: Flee was also nominated for the Academy Award for Best Documentary Feature Film and Academy Award for Best Animated Feature.)	Flugt	Jonas Poher Rasmussen	Nominated
2022 (95th)	Holy Spider	عنکبوت مقدس	Ali Abbasi	Made shortlist
2023 (96th)	The Promised Land	Bastarden	Nikolaj Arcel	Made shortlist
2024 (97th)	The Girl with the Needle	Pigen med nålen	Magnus von Horn	Nominated
2025 (98th)	Mr Nobody Against Putin (Note: Mr. Nobody Against Putin won the Academy Award for Best Documentary Feature Film.)		David Borenstein and Pavel Talankin	Not nominated
2026 (99th)	Woman Unknown	Kvinde ukendt	May el-Toukhy	Pending

== Shortlisted films ==
Each year since 2010, the Danish Film Institute has announced a three-film shortlist prior to announcing the official Danish Oscar candidate. The following films were shortlisted by Denmark but not selected as the final candidate:

Year	Films
2010	R · Submarino
2011	A Family · A Funny Man
2012	Love Is All You Need · The Passion of Marie
2013	The Act of Killing · Northwest
2014	Someone You Love · Speed Walking
2015	The Look of Silence · Men & Chicken
2016	The Commune · Walk with Me
2017	Darkland · Word of God
2018	A Fortunate Man · Winter Brothers
2019	Before the Frost · Daniel
2020	Enforcement · A Perfectly Normal Family
2021	Margrete: Queen of the North · The Shadow in My Eye
2022	As in Heaven · Forever
2023	Apolonia, Apolonia · Before It Ends
2024	Echo of You · Sons
2025	Beginnings · The Last Viking
2026	Home · What Lies Between Us

== See also ==
- List of Greenlandic submissions for the Academy Award for Best International Feature Film
