= Jesper Christensen =

Danish actor

- Born: 16 May 1948 (age 78); Copenhagen, Denmark
- Occupation: Actor
- Years active: 1968–present
- Spouse: Tove Bornhøft (m. 2000)
- Children: 2

Jesper Christensen (Danish pronunciation: [ˈjespɐ ˈkʰʁestn̩sn̩, - ˈkʰʁæs-]; born 16 May 1948) is a Danish actor. A veteran of European cinema, he has made the transition to English language projects, including The Interpreter and Revelations. He has also appeared as the mysterious villain Mr. White in the James Bond films Casino Royale, Quantum of Solace, and Spectre.

In his home country, Christensen has won four Bodil Awards, three for Best Actor: Did Somebody Laugh? (1978), The Bench (2000), and Manslaughter (2005), and one for Best Supporting Actor: Barbara (1997).

In 2006, Jesper Christensen declined the offer to receive the Knight's Cross of the Order of the Dannebrog. He said that he thought the entire idea of monarchy is a crime against the members of the royal family, and it does not fit with modern ideas.

== Filmography ==
=== Film ===
Year	Title	Role(s)	Director(s)
1976	Strømer	Young Officer	Anders Refn
1977	Mind Your Back, Professor	Journalist	Jens Okking
1977	Havoc	Steffensen	Ole Roos
1978	Winterborn	Anders	Astrid Henning-Jensen
1978	Did Somebody Laugh?	Unemployed Man	Henning Carlsen
1978	Wanna See My Beautiful Navel?	Fashion Photographer	Søren Kragh-Jacobsen
1978	Who Kills Who?	Christian	Li Vilstrup
1979	Charly & Steffen	Eigil	Henning Kristiansen
1980	It's a World Full of Children	Morten	Aase Schmidt
1980	Children of the Thralls	Unknown Voice	Jannik Hastrup
1980	Sorry We're Here	Aage	Hans Kristensen
1981	Have You Seen Alice?	Bjarne	Brita Wielopolska
1983	The Traitors	The Boy	Ole Roos
1987	Hip Hip Hurrah!	Viggo Johansen	Kjell Grede
1988	Emma's Shadow	Poul	Søren Kragh-Jacobsen
1989	The Knight of Justice	Father	Jesper W. Nielsen
1990	A Modern Woman	Michael Nordgreen	Stefan Henszelman
1990	Good Evening, Mr. Wallenberg	Officer at Watteau Square	Kjell Grede
1992	Sofie	Hans Højby	Liv Ullmann
1993	The Russian Singer	Castensen	Morten Arnfred
1994	Carl, My Childhood Symphony	Schreiber	Erik Clausen
1995	White Lies	Kristian	Mats Arehn
1995	Summer	Flemming	Kristian Petri
1996	Watch Me Fly	Hans-Jørgen	Vibeke Gad
1996	Hamsun	Otto Dietrich	Jan Troell
1996	The Ballad of the Viking King, Holger the Dane	Hemming I / Loki	Laila Hodell
1996	The White Lioness	Konovalenko	Pelle Berglund
1997	Credo	Brother 1	Susanne Bier
1997	Barbara	Judge	Nils Malmros
1998	Albert	Shoemaker	Jørn Faurschou
1999	Sophie's World	Søren Kierkegaard	Erik Gustavson
1999	In China They Eat Dogs	Bartender	Lasse Spang Olsen
2000	The Bench	Kaj	Per Fly
2000	Anna	Johansen	Erik Wedersøe
2000	Italian for Beginners	Olympia's Father	Lone Scherfig
2001	One-Hand Clapping	H.C. Krøyer	Gert Fredholm
2001	The Greatest Thing	Theatre Manager	Thomas Robsahm
2001	Count Axel	Col. Lejpstrup	Søren Fauli
2002	Okay	Læge	Jesper W. Nielsen
2002	Minor Mishaps	Søren Kreiberg	Annette K. Olesen
2002	Treasure Planet	Scroop (Voice; Danish dub)	Ron Clements & John Musker
2003	Inheritance	Holger Andersen	Per Fly
2003	Baby	Eddy	Linda Wendel
2003	Nasty Brats	JB	Giacomo Campeotto
2003	Make Believe	Piips	Kjell Grede
2005	The Interpreter	Nils Lud	Sydney Pollack
2005	Manslaughter	Carsten	Per Fly
2006	Shaking Dream Land	George	Martina Nagel
2006	Pure Hearts	Bag Man	Kenneth Kainz
2006	Casino Royale	Mr. White	Martin Campbell
2008	Flame & Citron	Wilhelm Faurschou Hviid	Ole Christian Madsen
2008	One Shot	Lennart	Linda Wendel
2008	Everlasting Moments	Sebastian Pedersen	Jan Troell
2008	Quantum of Solace	Mr. White	Marc Forster
2009	Storm	Anthony Weber	Hans-Christian Schmid
2009	The Young Victoria	Christian Friedrich, Baron Stockmar	Jean-Marc Vallée
2009	Original	Bruno	Alexander Brøndsted & Antonio Tublén
2009	This Is Love	Koller	Matthias Glasner
2010	A Family	Rickard Rheinwald	Pernille Fischer Christensen
2010	The Debt	Dr. Bernhardt / Dieter Vogel	John Madden
2011	Melancholia	Little Father	Lars von Trier
2011	Julie	Master	Linda Wendel
2012	The Last Sentence	Torgny Segerstedt	Jan Troell
2013	Sex, Drugs & Taxation	Judge Bergsøe	Christoffer Boe
2013	Sisters	Uncle Rolle	Anne Wild
2013	Nymphomaniac	Jerôme's Uncle	Lars von Trier
2015	Me and Kaminski	Manuel Kaminski	Wolfgang Becker
2015	Spectre	Mr. White	Sam Mendes
2016	The King's Choice	Haakon VII	Erik Poppe
2017	Robin	Pierre	Antonio Tublén
2018	Before the Frost	Jens	Michael Noer
2020	Into the Darkness	Karl Skov	Anders Refn
2020	Little Butterfly	Ernst	Søren Kragh-Jacobsen
2022	Out of the Darkness	Karl Skov	Anders Refn
2022	More Than Ever	Unknown	Emily Atef
2022	The Little Alien	Helge (Voice)	Amalie Næsby Fick
2023	Munch	Dr. Daniel Jacobson	Henrik Martin Dahlsbakken
2025	Honey	Marcel	Natasha Arthy
2025	Sentimental Value	Michael	Joachim Trier
2026	Home	Ejner	Marijana Jankovic
2026	The Price of Peace	Karl Skov	Anders Refn
