= Fish Out of Water (1993 film) =

- Directed by: Erik Clausen
- Starring: Erik Clausen; Helle Ryslinge
- Distributed by: Nordisk Film
- Release date: 26 February 1993
- Running time: 1h 37min
- Country: Denmark
- Language: Danish
- Box office: 257,345 admissions (Denmark)

Fish Out of Water (Danish: De frigjorte) is a 1993 Danish comedy film directed by Erik Clausen.

The film was the second most popular Danish film of the year behind Stolen Spring.

== Cast ==
- Erik Clausen - Viggo
- Helle Ryslinge - Oda
- Leif Sylvester Petersen - Iversen
- Anne Marie Helger - Karen
- Bjarne Liller - Snedker
- Torben Zeller - Carlsen
- Lene Brøndum - Fru Sørensen
- Kjeld Løfting - Falsk Læge
- Claus Bue - Direktør
- Lars Lippert - Claus
