= List of submissions to the 51st Academy Awards for Best Foreign Language Film =

1978 Best Foreign Language Film submissions

Highlights
- Oscar winner: (France) Get Out Your Handkerchiefs
- Submissions: 19
- Debuts: 2

This is a list of submissions to the 51st Academy Awards for Best Foreign Language Film. The Academy Award for Best Foreign Language Film was created in 1956 by the Academy of Motion Picture Arts and Sciences to honour non-English-speaking films produced outside the United States. The award is handed out annually, and is accepted by the winning film's director, although it is considered an award for the submitting country as a whole. Countries are invited by the Academy to submit their best films for competition according to strict rules, with only one film being accepted from each country.

For the 51st Academy Awards, nineteen films were submitted in the category Academy Award for Best Foreign Language Film. Cuba and Lebanon submitted films for consideration for the first time. The five nominated films came from France, West Germany, Hungary, Italy and the Soviet Union.

France won for the eleventh time with Get Out Your Handkerchiefs by Bertrand Blier.

== Submissions ==
Submitting country	Film title used in nomination	Original title	Language(s)	Director(s)	Result
Brazil	The Lyre of Delight	A Lira do Delírio	Brazilian Portuguese	Walter Lima Jr.	Not nominated
Cuba	The Recourse to the Method / Viva el Presidente	El recurso del método	Spanish	Miguel Littín	Not nominated
Czechoslovakia	Dinner for Adele / Nick Carter in Prague	Adéla ještě nevečeřela	Czech	Oldřich Lipský	Not nominated
Denmark	Me and Charly	Mig og Charly	Danish	Morten Arnfred and Henning Kristiansen	Not nominated
France	Get Out Your Handkerchiefs	Préparez vos mouchoirs	French	Bertrand Blier	Won Academy Award
West Germany	The Glass Cell	Die Gläserne Zelle	German	Hans W. Geißendörfer	Nominated
Hungary	Hungarians	Magyarok	Hungarian	Zoltán Fábri	Nominated
India	The Chess Players	शतरंज के खिलाड़ी	Hindi, Urdu, English	Satyajit Ray	Not nominated
Israel	Lemon Popsicle	אסקימו לימון	Hebrew	Boaz Davidson	Not nominated
Italy	Viva Italia!	I nuovi mostri	Italian	Dino Risi, Ettore Scola and Mario Monicelli	Nominated
Japan	Empire of Passion	愛の亡霊	Japanese	Nagisa Ōshima	Not nominated
Kuwait	The Wedding of Zein	عرس الزين	Arabic	Khalid Al Siddiq	Not nominated
Lebanon	Promise of Love	Սիրո Խոստումը	Armenian, English, French	Sarky Mouradian	Not nominated
Mexico	The Place Without Limits	El lugar sin límites	Spanish	Arturo Ripstein	Not nominated
Netherlands	Pastorale 1943		Dutch	Wim Verstappen	Not nominated
Poland	Death of a President	Śmierć Prezydenta	Polish	Jerzy Kawalerowicz	Not nominated
Soviet Union	White Bim Black Ear	Белый Бим Черное ухо	Russian	Stanislav Rostotsky	Nominated
Spain	Somnambulists	Sonámbulos	Spanish	Manuel Gutiérrez Aragón	Not nominated
Yugoslavia	Occupation in 26 Pictures	Okupacija u 26 slika	Serbo-Croatian, Italian, German, Russian, French, Latin	Lordan Zafranović	Not nominated

== Sources ==
- Margaret Herrick Library, Academy of Motion Picture Arts and Sciences
