= 61st Bodil Awards =

2008 Danish film awards ceremony

- Date: 24 February 2008
- Site: Imperial Cinema, Copenhagen
- Hosted by: Louise Mieritz and Ditte Hansen

Highlights
- Best Film: The Art of Crying
- Best Actor: Jesper Asholt; The Art of Crying
- Best Actress: Noomi Rapace; Daisy Diamond
- Most awards: The Art of Crying (2)

The 61st Bodil Awards were held on 24 February 2008 in Imperial Cinema in Copenhagen, Denmark, honouring the best national and foreign films of 1007. Louise Mieritz and Ditte Hansen hosted the event. The Art of Crying won the awards for Best Film and Best Actor (Jesper Asholt). Noomi Rapace won the award for Best Actress for her performance in Daisy Diamond.

== Winners ==
=== Best Danish Film ===
- The Art of Crying
  - AFR
  - Fightgirl Ayse
  - White Night

=== Best Actor in a Leading Role ===
- Jesper Asholt -The Art of Crying
  - Kim Bodnia – Ekko
  - Lars Brygmann – White Night
  - David Dencik – Uden for kærligheden
- Jannik Lorenzen – The Art of Crying

=== Best Actress in a Leading Role ===
- Noomi Rapace – Daisy Diamond
  - Rikke Louise Andersson – White Night
  - Sonja Richter – Cecilie
  - Paprika Steen – The Substitute
  - Semra Turan – Fightgirl Ayse

=== Best Actor in a Supporting Role ===
- Morten Grunwald – White Night
  - Dejan Čukić – De unge år
  - Nicolaj Kopernikus – De fortabte sjæles ø
  - Søren Malling – De unge år
  - Cyron Melville – Fightgirl Ayse

=== Best Actress in a Supporting Role ===
- Charlotte Fich – Just Another Love Story
  - Anne Sophie Byder – White Night
  - Stine Fischer Christensen – Ekko
  - Trine Dyrholm – Daisy Diamond
  - Hanne Hedelund – The Art of Crying

=== Best American Film ===
- Letters from Iwo Jima
  - The Darjeeling Limited
  - I'm Not There
  - Paranoid Park
  - Zodiac

=== Best Non-American Film ===
- Pan's Labyrinth
  - 4 Months, 3 Weeks and 2 Days
  - Eastern Promises
  - Persepolis
  - Reprise

=== Best Cinematographer ===
- Dan Laustsen for The Substitute and Just Another Love Story

=== Best Documentary Film ===
- The Monastery

=== Bodil Special Award ===
- Ghost Digital Production House for effects in Island of Lost Souls

=== Bodil Honorary Award ===
- Ib Monty, Margurete Engberg, and Nils Jensen

== See also ==
- 2008 Robert Awards
