= You Disappear (novel) =

2012 novel by Christian Jungersen

- First edition (Danish)
- Author: Christian Jungersen
- Original title: Du forsvinder
- Translator: Misha Hoekstra
- Language: Danish
- Genre: Novel
- Publisher: Gyldendal (Denmark), Nan A. Talese (English)
- Publication date: 2012 (Danish); 7 January 2014 (English)
- Publication place: Denmark
- Media type: Print (Paperback and hardback)

You Disappear (Danish: Du Forsvinder) is a novel written by Danish author Christian Jungersen and first published in 2012. It was adapted into a feature film by the same name in 2017.

== Plot summary ==
The narrator Mia is married to Frederik who undergoes radical personality changes due to a slowly growing brain tumor that leaves his intellect, speech and motor control intact. Their lives change even more when it comes out that, in the year before his diagnosis, Frederik embezzled DKK 12 million from the private school in Copenhagen where he is headmaster. But was the tumor already determining his actions at the time, absolving him, or should he go to jail?

In preparing Frederik's defense, Mia immerses herself in the latest brain research, the emerging neurological portrait of human nature, and the classic metaphysical question of free will. Her reading profoundly affects how she responds to Frederik – and to her own passionate impulses.

== Reception ==
You Disappear has been both a critical and a commercial success in Denmark since being published there in March 2012. Library and newspaper readers awarded it the Læsernes Bogpris, and it was nominated for two other major honors, Politiken's Literature Prize and the Martha Prize, while staying on the top-10 list of bestselling fiction for an entire year. You Disappear was scheduled to be published in an additional 10 countries in 2013 and 2014, with US publication slated for January 2014 from Nan A. Talese/Doubleday. The American translation by Misha Hoekstra won the Leif & Inger Sjöberg Prize from the American-Scandinavian Foundation.

== Adaption ==
The novel was adapted into a feature film by the same name directed by Peter Schønau Fog in 2017.
