= Freedom on Parole =

- Theatrical poster
- Frihed på prøve
- Directed by: Erik Clausen
- Screenplay by: Erik Clausen
- Produced by: Peter Ingemann
- Starring: Erik Clausen; Helene Egelund; Jesper Asholt; Henrik Lykkegaard
- Cinematography: Lars Reinholdt
- Edited by: Anders Refn
- Music by: Anders Bækholm Jensen
- Production company: Clausen Film
- Distributed by: Nordisk Film
- Release date: 10 June 2010 (Denmark)
- Running time: 104 min.
- Country: Denmark
- Language: Danish
- Budget: DKK 18,750,000

Freedom on Parole (Danish: Frihed på prøve) is a 2010 Danish comedy-drama written and directed by and starring Erik Clausen, Helene Egelund, Jesper Asholt, and Henrik Lykkegaard. The film was produced by Clausen Film and distributed by Nordisk Film, and follows up on themes in Clausen's 2007 film Temporary Release.

== Plot ==
The middle-aged petty criminal John is released on probation. John travels to Jutland to help his son, who by his own admission is knee deep in shit. Finally, John has a chance to be the father, he always wanted to be. John does everything to solve his son and daughter-in-law's problems. But the reality is more varied, and when John finds out that he is the grandfather of a colored child, that he will have to take three different jobs, that he falls in love, and that he is a hunted man.

== Cast ==
- Erik Clausen as John
- Helene Egelund as Jeanne
- Jesper Asholt as Bo
- Henrik Lykkegaard as Mads Ole
- Henrik Bruhn as Kenneth
- Pil Egholm as Bettina
- Elith Nykjær Jørgensen as Sømmet (as Elith 'Nulle' Nykjær)
- Peter Plaugborg as Originalen
- Jytte Kvinesdal as Fru Sørensen
- Torben Zeller as Muhammedtegneren
