= Else Petersen =

Danish actress (1910–2002)

- Born: 26 April 1910; Copenhagen, Denmark
- Died: 28 August 2002 (aged 92); Denmark
- Occupation: Actress
- Years active: 1936–1993

Else Petersen (26 April 1910 – 28 August 2002) was a Danish film and stage actress. She appeared in 44 films between 1936 and 1993.

== Partial filmography ==
- Maria the Maid (1936) - Alice's friend
- Flådens blå matroser (1937) - Else
- En ganske almindelig pige (1940) - Pige til prøvefilmning (uncredited)
- Wienerbarnet (1941) - Sofie
- Tyrannens Fald (1942)
- Melody of Murder (1944) - Frk. Baunsø
- The Old Mill on Mols (1953) - Frøken Ballerup
- Bruden fra Dragstrup (1955) - Husassistent
- Kristiane af Marstal (1956) - Bryllupsgæst
- Der var engang en gade (1957) - Vred kreditor på trappen
- Tre piger fra Jylland (1957) - Stuepigen Marie
- Baronessen fra benzintanken (1960) - Kokkepige (uncredited)
- Onkel Joakims hemmelighed (1967) - Middagsgæst (uncredited)
- 2 - I, a Woman, Part II (1968) - Her sister
- Det var en lørdag aften (1968) - Politimands kone
- Soldaterkammerater på bjørnetjeneste (1968) - Frk. Petersen (uncredited)
- Mig og min lillebror og storsmuglerne (1968) - Anna
- The Veterinarian's Adopted Children (1968) - Fru Eriksen
- Farlig sommer (1969) - Købmandskone
- Me and My Kid Brother and Doggie (1969) - Weinholms kone
- I Tyrens tegn (1974) - Blad / Chief editor's wife
- Per (1975) - Fru Petersen
- Brand-Børge rykker ud (1976) - Postfunktionær
- I Løvens tegn (1976) - Soffy
- Affæren i Mølleby (1976) - Godtfredsens sekretær
- Agent 69 Jensen i Skorpionens tegn (1977) - Irmas veninde
- Lille spejl (1978) - Værtshusholderske Lizzie
- Agent 69 Jensen i Skyttens tegn (1978) - Kunde i rejsebureau
- Hør, var der ikke en som lo? (1978) - Bibliotekaren / Grænsevagten
- Rend mig i traditionerne (1979) - Frk. Mortensen
- Øjeblikket (1980) - Patient
- Belladonna (1981) - Kvinden i toget
- In the Middle of the Night (1984) - Ældre dame i tv-studie (uncredited)
- Den kroniske uskyld (1985) - Fransklærerinde
- Ofelia kommer til byen (1985) - Theodora
- Early Spring (1986) - Frk. Thomsens mor
- Flamberede hjerter (1986) - Fru Lynge
- Sidste akt (1987) - Sarita Myrtle
- Babette's Feast (1987) - Solveig
- Waltzing Regitze (1989) - Neighbour
- Camping (1990) - Ældre dame
- Casanova (1990) - Gammel Dame
- Europa (1991) - Old Female Assistant
- Black Harvest (1993) - Jomfru Rottbøll
