= Terror (1977 film) =

1977 film

- Directed by: Gert Fredholm
- Written by: Hans Hansen; Torben Nielsen
- Produced by: Erik Crone; Jørgen Lademann; Jørgen Schmidt Nicolaisen
- Starring: Bo Løvetand
- Cinematography: Morten Arnfred
- Edited by: Anders Refn
- Release date: 4 March 1977
- Running time: 102 minutes
- Country: Denmark
- Language: Danish

Terror is a 1977 Danish crime film directed by Gert Fredholm and starring Bo Løvetand.

== Cast ==
- Bo Løvetand - Boy
- Johnny Olsen - Trigger
- Ole Meyer - Schatz
- Jess Ingerslev - Benny
- Poul Reichhardt - Kriminalassistent Ancher
- Ole Ernst - Kriminalassistent Brask
- Ulf Pilgaard - Kriminalassistent Rieger
- Holger Juul Hansen - Kriminalkommisær Runge
- Knirke - Kate
- Ingolf David - Streichner
- Henning Palner - Direktør Ejlersen
- Lykke Nielsen - Direktør Ejlersens sekretær Jette
- Beatrice Palner - Schatz' mor
- Aksel Erhardtsen - Schatz' far
- Inger Stender - Schatz' fars sekretær
- Lise Thomsen - S-togspassager
- Lone Helmer - Cafeteriadame
- Ib Tardini - Cafeteriamedhjælper
- Ulla Jessen - Bennys fars veninde
- Ulla Koppel - Dame i pølsebod
