= The Great Day on the Beach =

1991 film

- Film poster
- Directed by: Stellan Olsson
- Written by: Stellan Olsson
- Starring: Erik Clausen
- Release date: 19 September 1991
- Running time: 100 minutes
- Country: Denmark
- Language: Danish
- Box office: DKr 2.6 million

The Great Day on the Beach (Danish: Den store badedag) is a 1991 Danish drama film directed by Stellan Olsson. The film was selected as the Danish entry for the Best Foreign Language Film at the 64th Academy Awards, but was not accepted as a nominee.

== Cast ==
- Erik Clausen as Axel
- Nina Gunke as Svea
- Benjamin Rothenborg Vibe as Gustav Adolf
- Jesper Klein as Fortælleren
- Hans Alfredson as Morfar (as Hasse Alfredsson)
- Liselotte Lohmann as Emilie
- Bjarne Liller as Skyggen

== Reception ==
The film was the tenth highest-grossing film in Denmark for the year (and second highest Danish film) with a gross of 2.6 million Danish Krone.

== See also ==
- List of submissions to the 64th Academy Awards for Best Foreign Language Film
- List of Danish submissions for the Academy Award for Best Foreign Language Film
