= You Disappear =

2017 film

- Film poster
- Directed by: Peter Schønau Fog
- Written by: Peter Schønau Fog
- Starring: Trine Dyrholm; Nikolaj Lie Kaas; Michael Nyqvist
- Distributed by: Nordisk Film
- Release date: 20 April 2017
- Running time: 117 minutes
- Country: Denmark
- Language: Danish

You Disappear (Danish: Du forsvinder) is a 2017 Danish drama film directed by Peter Schønau Fog. The film was based on Christian Jungersen's novel by the same name. It was screened in the Special Presentations section at the 2017 Toronto International Film Festival. It was selected as the Danish entry for the Best Foreign Language Film at the 90th Academy Awards, but it was not nominated.

This is Michael Nyqvist‘s last film released 2 months before his death.

== Plot ==
Frederik is diagnosed with a brain tumor that can cause behaviour disturbances. His wife Mia questions what kind of man he is, especially when it's discovered he is embezzling from the school he headmasters.

== Cast ==
- Trine Dyrholm as Mia Halling
- Nikolaj Lie Kaas as Frederik Halling
- Michael Nyqvist as Bernard Berman
- Sofus Rønnov as Niklas Halling
- Mikkel Boe Følsgaard as Prosecutor
- Emilie Koppel as Emilie

== Reception ==
On review aggregator website Rotten Tomatoes, the film has an approval rating of 36% based on 11 reviews, and an average rating of 5.2/10.

== See also ==
- List of submissions to the 90th Academy Awards for Best Foreign Language Film
- List of Danish submissions for the Academy Award for Best Foreign Language Film
