= Refn =

Refn is a surname. Notable people with the surname include:

- Anders Refn (born 1944), Danish cutter, film director, and screenwriter
- Helge Refn (1908–1985), Danish artist
- Nicolas Winding Refn (born 1970), Danish film director, screenwriter, and producer, son of Anders
