= Per (film) =

1975 film

- Film poster
- Directed by: Hans Kristensen
- Written by: Hans Kristensen
- Produced by: Erik Crone
- Starring: Ole Ernst
- Cinematography: Dirk Brüel
- Release date: 22 January 1975
- Running time: 107 minutes
- Country: Denmark
- Language: Danish

Per is a 1975 Danish drama film directed by Hans Kristensen. The film was selected as the Danish entry for the Best Foreign Language Film at the 48th Academy Awards, but was not accepted as a nominee. Agneta Ekmanner received the Bodil Award for Best Actress in a Leading Role for her performance in the film.

== Cast ==
- Ole Ernst as Per Hansen
- Frits Helmuth as Helge Lorentzen
- Agneta Ekmanner as Marianne Lorentzen
- Peter Ronild as Tysk sprængstofekspert
- Per Årman as Betjent
- Else Petersen as Fru Petersen
- Alf Lassen as Vagtmand
- Søren Steen as Vagtmand
- Poul Møller as Ekspedient I pornoforretning
- Holger Munk as Politiinspektør
- Pernille Grumme as Prostitueret
- Ingerlise Gaarde as Ekspedient
- Hans Kristensen as Bilist

== See also ==
- List of submissions to the 48th Academy Awards for Best Foreign Language Film
- List of Danish submissions for the Academy Award for Best Foreign Language Film
