= Erni Arneson =

Danish actress (1917–2006)

- Born: Erni Buchtrup; 12 September 1917; Århus, Denmark
- Died: 8 December 2006 (aged 89); Copenhagen, Denmark
- Occupation: Actress
- Years active: 1942–2006

Erni Arneson (née Buchtrup; 12 September 1917 – 8 December 2006) was a Danish film actress. She appeared in 25 films between 1942 and 2006. She was born in Århus, Denmark and died in Copenhagen, Denmark.

== Filmography ==
- Baby på eventyr – 1942
- Vi kunne ha' det så rart – 1942
- Det kære København – 1944
- I går og i morgen – 1945
- Billet mrk. – 1946
- Jeg elsker en anden – 1946
- Ta', hvad du vil ha' – 1947
- Mani – 1947
- Mens porten var lukket – 1948
- I de lyse nætter – 1948
- I kongens klær – 1954
- Min datter Nelly – 1955
- Mig og min familie – 1957
- Baronessen fra benzintanken – 1960
- Trekanter – 1969
- Tænk på et tal – 1969
- Ballade på Christianshavn – 1971
- I morgen, min elskede – 1971
- Olsen-banden på sporet – 1975
- Den kroniske uskyld – 1985
- Sidste akt – 1987
- Sort høst – 1993
- Carlo og Ester – 1994
- Sunes familie – 1997
- Efter brylluppet – 2006
