= The Russian Singer =

1993 film

- Directed by: Morten Arnfred
- Written by: Morten Arnfred; William Aldridge; Leif Davidsen
- Produced by: Erik Crone
- Starring: Ole Lemmeke
- Cinematography: Alexander Gruszynski
- Edited by: Lizzi Weischenfeldt
- Distributed by: Pathé-Nordisk
- Release date: 15 January 1993
- Running time: 119 minutes
- Country: Denmark
- Language: Danish

The Russian Singer (Danish: Den russiske sangerinde) is a 1993 Danish thriller film directed by Morten Arnfred and starring Ole Lemmeke. It was entered into the 43rd Berlin International Film Festival.

== Cast ==
- Ole Lemmeke as Jack Andersen
- Elena Butenko as Lili
- Vsevolod Larionov as Colonel Gavrilin
- Igor Volkov as Basov Aleksandrovitj
- Igor Yasulovich as Pyotr Demichev
- Jesper Christensen as Castensen
- Erik Mørk as C.W.
- Andrei Yurenyov as Tushin (as Andrei Yurenev)
- Igor Statsenko as Dima
- Oleg Plaksin as General Panyukov
- Vladimir Troshin as General Vlasov
- Yuriy Sherstnyov as Panyukov's Lawyer
- Vladimir Grammatikov as Nikolaj Davidovitj Klejmann
