= Carsten Overskov =

Danish writer (1946–2015)

Carsten Overskov (12 August 1946 – 28 May 2015) was a Danish writer.

Overskov also wrote, produced and directed the 1984 TV series Crash.

== Selected bibliography ==
- Swarbrick og hajerne (1980)
- Det bli'r svært, Swarbrick (1981)
- Det var bare ærgerligt, Swarbrick (1982)
- Truslen fra det sorte hul (1984)
- 1212 (1985)
- Nul-timen (1986)
- Få mere ud af dine voksne (1987)
- Kæber af stål (1987)
- Bjørneklo (1988)
- Dracula - dræberen (1989)
- Kludder (1989)
- Bjergenes skønhed (1991)
- Hulk (1991)
- De andre (1995)
