= Ole Lemmeke =

Danish actor (born 1959)

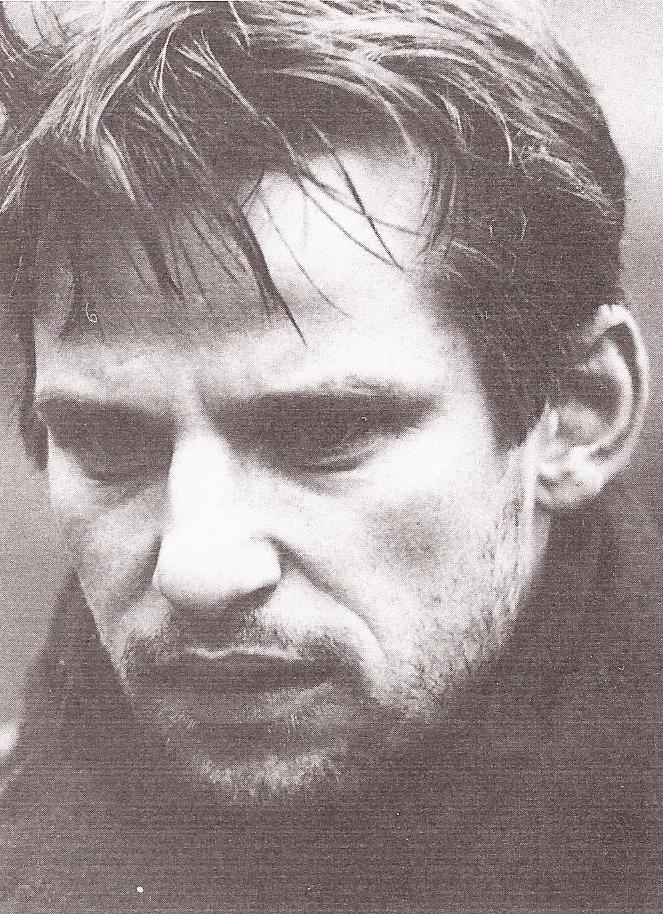
Ole Lemmeke.

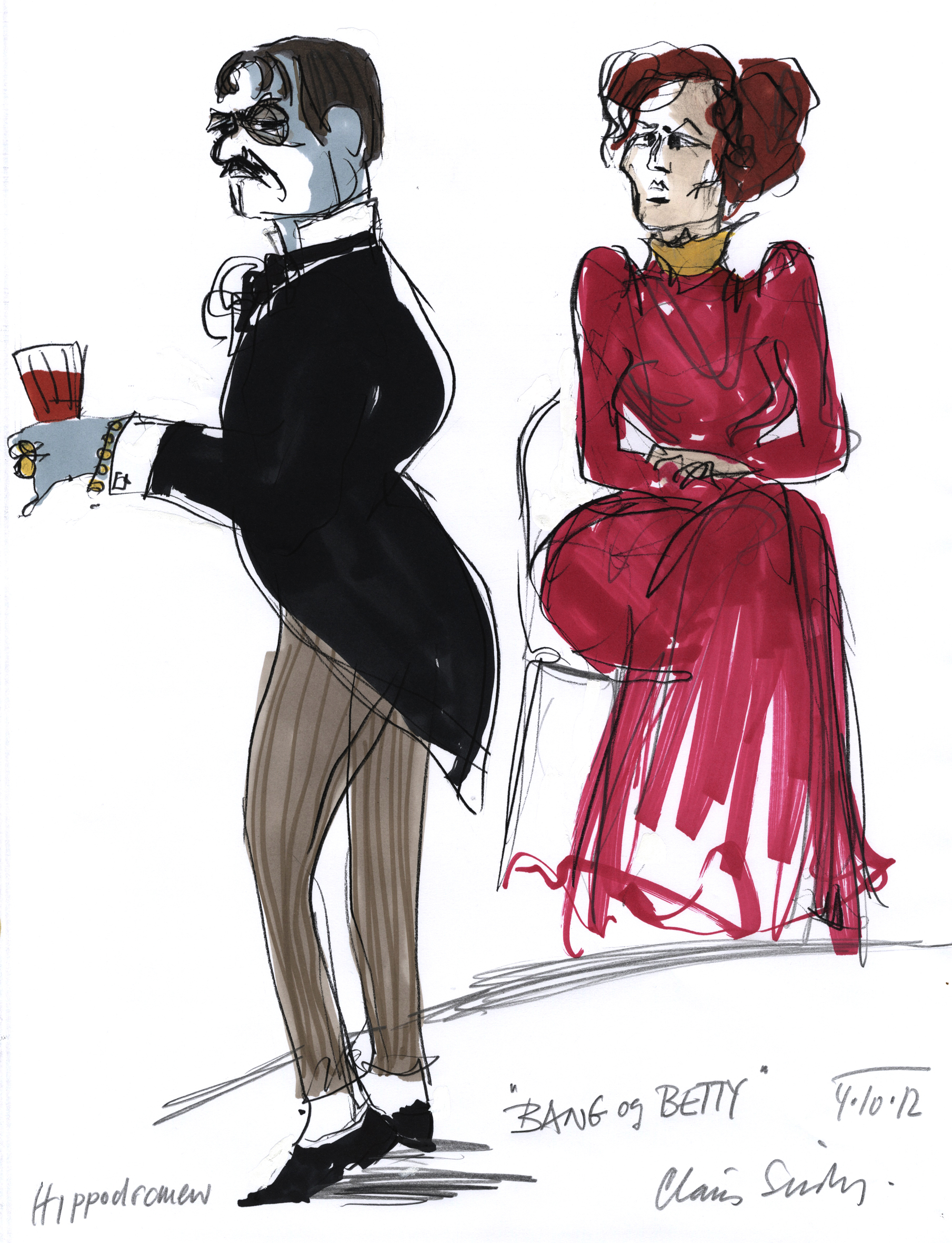
Cartoon of Ole Lemmeke.

Ole Lemmeke (born 10 January 1959 in Copenhagen) is a Danish actor. He is known for his work in Besat, Magnetisøren's femte vinter and Den russiske sangerinde.

As of 2012, he was playing the role of Herman Bang in Bang and Betty at the Folketeatret (People's Theatre) in Denmark.
