= The Dark Side of the Moon (1986 film) =

1986 film

- Film poster
- Directed by: Erik Clausen
- Written by: Erik Clausen
- Starring: Christina Bengtsson
- Release date: 7 March 1986
- Running time: 90 minutes
- Country: Denmark
- Language: Danish

The Dark Side of the Moon (Danish: Manden i månen) is a 1986 Danish drama film directed by Erik Clausen. The film was selected as the Danish entry for the Best Foreign Language Film at the 59th Academy Awards, but was not accepted as a nominee.

== Cast ==
- Christina Bengtsson as Christina
- Mogens Eckert
- Stig Hoffmeyer as Tjener
- Kim Jansson
- Catherine Poul Jupont as Maria Bianca
- Marianne Mortensen as Luder (hooker)
- Anne Nøjgaard as Luder (hooker)
- Berthe Qvistgaard as Johannes mor
- Roy Richards as Afrikansk gæstearbejder
- Peter Thiel as Johannes
- Erik Truxa as Politiassistent
- Yavuzer Çetinkaya as Tyrkisk gæstearbejder

== See also ==
- List of submissions to the 59th Academy Awards for Best Foreign Language Film
- List of Danish submissions for the Academy Award for Best Foreign Language Film
