= Tomorrow My Love =

1971 film

- Directed by: Finn Karlsson
- Written by: Finn Karlsson; Peter Ronild
- Produced by: H. P. Møller Andersen; Esben Høilund Carlsen
- Starring: Lykke Nielsen
- Cinematography: Carsten Behrendt-Poulsen
- Edited by: Anker Sørensen
- Release date: 8 March 1971
- Running time: 101 minutes
- Country: Denmark
- Language: Danish

Tomorrow My Love (Danish: I morgen, min elskede) is a 1971 Danish drama film directed by Finn Karlsson and starring Lykke Nielsen.

== Cast ==
- Lykke Nielsen - Isabel
- Kirsten Peüliche - Marca
- Morten Grunwald - David
- Jesper Langberg - Michael
- Pernille Grumme - Gerd
- Erni Arneson - Isabels mor
- Preben Mahrt - Isabels far
- Poul Petersen - Marcas far
- Bo Bonfils - Gustav
- Helge Scheuer - Boghandler
- Erik Dibbern - Kunde i boghandel
- Niels Andersen - Løjtnant
- Pernille Skov - Pige på vaskeri
- Erik Larsen - Portner
- Esben Høilund Carlsen - Scenograf
- Knud Larsen - Scenearbejder
- Poul Reichhardt - Skuespiller
