= Villa Paranoia =

- Directed by: Erik Clausen
- Starring: Erik Clausen; Sonja Richter; Frits Helmuth; Sidse Babett Knudsen
- Release date: 12 March 2004
- Running time: 1h 46min
- Country: Denmark
- Language: Danish

Villa Paranoia is a 2004 Danish drama film directed by Erik Clausen.

== Cast ==
- Erik Clausen - Jørgen
- Sonja Richter - Anna
- Frits Helmuth - Walentin
- Sidse Babett Knudsen - Olga Holmgård
