= Johnny Larsen =

1979 film

- Film poster
- Directed by: Morten Arnfred
- Written by: John Nehm; Morten Arnfred
- Produced by: Just Betzer
- Starring: Allan Olsen
- Cinematography: Dirk Brüel
- Release date: 1 October 1979
- Running time: 100 minutes
- Country: Denmark
- Language: Danish

Johnny Larsen is a 1979 Danish drama film directed by Morten Arnfred. The film was selected as the Danish entry for the Best Foreign Language Film at the 52nd Academy Awards, but was not accepted as a nominee.

== Cast ==
- Allan Olsen as Johnny Larsen
- Aksel Erhardtsen as Hans' father
- Jannie Faurschou
- Svend Hansson as The blacksmith
- Anne Marie Helger as Bagerjomfru
- Frits Helmuth as Johnnys father
- Ole Meyer as Hans
- Ib Mossin as Værkføreren
- Elsebeth Nielsen as Britta, Johnnys girlfriend
- Finn Nielsen as Oversergenten
- Berthe Qvistgaard as Johnnys grandmother
- Kurt Ravn as Man Seeking Work
- Hanne Ribens as Johnny's mother

== Accolades ==
The film won the 1980 Bodil Award for Best Danish Film.

== See also ==
- List of submissions to the 52nd Academy Awards for Best Foreign Language Film
- List of Danish submissions for the Academy Award for Best Foreign Language Film
