= Helene Egelund =

Danish actress (born 1965)

- Born: 16 February 1965 (age 61)
- Occupation: Actress
- Years active: 1986-present

Helene Egelund (born 16 February 1965) is a Danish actress. She has appeared in more than thirty films since 1986.

== Selected filmography ==
Film
Year	Title	Role	Notes
1989	1939	Annika	
1993	Family Matters	Lena	
1997	Barbara	Suzanne	
2010	Freedom on Parole	Jeanne	

TV
Year	Title	Role	Notes
1997-1999	Taxa	Gitte	
