= Bethlehem Night =

2022 film directed by Jan Svěrák

- Original title: Betlémské světlo
- Directed by: Jan Svěrák
- Written by: Zdeněk Svěrák
- Produced by: Eric Abraham; Jan Svěrák
- Starring: Zdeněk Svěrák
- Cinematography: Vladimír Smutný
- Edited by: František Svěrák
- Music by: Ondřej Soukup
- Production company: Biograf Jan Svěrák
- Distributed by: Bioscop
- Release date: 10 March 2022
- Running time: 100 minutes
- Country: Czech Republic
- Language: Czech
- Budget: 39 Million CZK
- Box office: 11,357,218 CZK

Bethlehem Night (Czech: Betlémské světlo) is a 2022 film directed by Jan Svěrák and written by his father Zdeněk Svěrák, who also stars in the film. It is a comedy based on three short stories written by Zdeněk Svěrák: Ruslan and Ludmila,Fotograf and Bethlehem Night.

== Cast ==
- Zdeněk Svěrák as Karel Šejnoha (writer)
- Daniela Kolářová as Helena Šejnohová (wife)
- Ondřej Vetchý as automechanik Bakalář (healer)
- Vladimír Javorský as Father
- Jitka Čvančarová as Mother
- Vojtěch Kotek as Mário Písecký
- Tereza Ramba as Vendula Velebová
- Patricia Schumann as Ludmila
