= Oil Gobblers =

- Czech: Ropáci
- Directed by: Jan Svěrák
- Written by: Jan Svěrák
- Produced by: Alena Dětáková
- Starring: Lubomír Beneš
- Cinematography: Ladislav Štěpán
- Edited by: Jan Sládek
- Music by: Vendula Kašpárková
- Release date: June 1988 (Kraków Film Festival)
- Running time: 20 minutes
- Country: Czechoslovakia
- Language: Czech

Oil Gobblers (Czech: Ropáci) is a 1988 Czech mockumentary directed by Jan Svěrák. The film won a Student Oscar from the Academy of Motion Picture Arts and Sciences at the 16th Annual Student Film Awards in June 1989.

== Synopsis ==
It follows a zoologist and a biochemist who venture into an oilfield with a cameraman and filmmaker to observe and study the elusive oil gobblers.
