= Tidsrejsen =

Danish television series

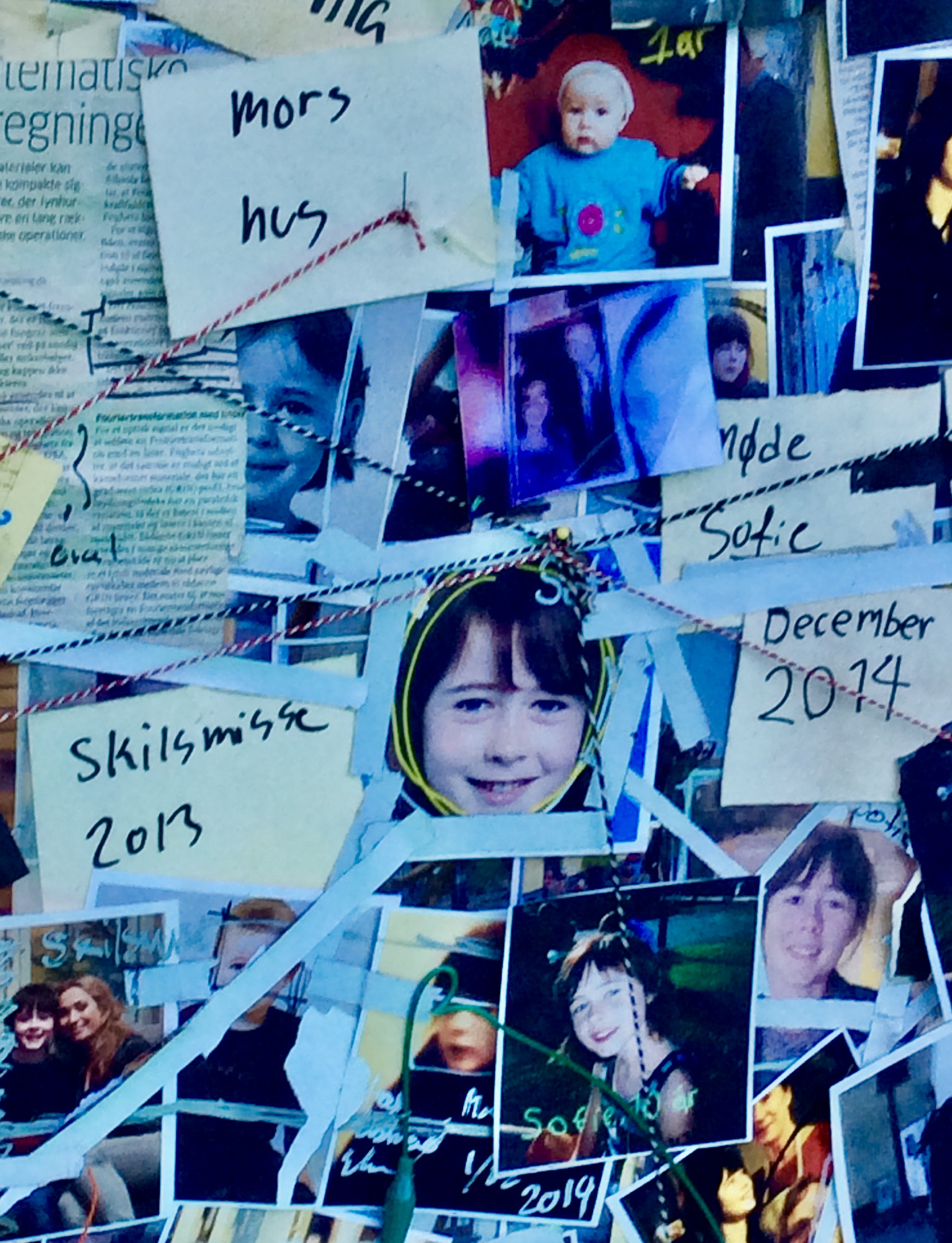
- Effects from the Christmas calendar exhibited 2014 in Copenhagen
- Genre: Televised advent calendar, science fiction
- Created by: Poul Berg
- Directed by: Kaspar Munk(season 1); Poul Berg (season 2); Jacob Bitsch (season 3)
- Starring: Bebiane Ivalo Kreutzmann [Hannibal Harbo Rasmussen (season 1)
- Music by: Flemming Nordkrog (score); Caroline Castell (lyrics and performance of theme song "Tidsrejsen" and season 2´s theme-song Tidsrejsen 2); Jonah Blacksmith (vocals, lyrics and performance of season 2´s theme-song Tidsrejsen 2 )
- Country of origin: Danmark
- Original language: Danish
- No. of episodes: 56

Production
- Producers: Bo Mortensen(season 1)); Asser Bo Paludan (season 2)
- Production locations: Dragør, Frederiksborg
- Running time: 25 minutes 37 minutes (episode 24)
- Production company: DR1

Original release
- Network: DR (Danish Broadcasting Corporation)
- Release: 1 December 2014 – 26 July 2025

Tidsrejsen (literally The Time Travel or The Voyage through Time in Danish) is a Danish television series in the form of a Nordic Christmas calendar that was shown over the Christmas period by the Danish Broadcasting Corporation in 2014. As per tradition for Nordic Christmas calendars, the series premiered on 1 December 2014 and its first season ran for 24 episodes. It was written by Poul Berg and directed by Kaspar Munk. Tidsrejsen was filmed mostly in the town of Dragør on Amager, south of Copenhagen. The series has science fiction elements, such as a time machine, and has themes of young love and general love, as well as family, the idea that actions have consequences and the idea that people decide their own fate in life.

The Danish Broadcasting Corporation described the Christmas calendar series as "Back to the Future meets the romantic comedy", and there are indeed many references to the popular film trilogy, among other time travel films.

The series was rewritten into a novel by the main writer Poul Berg, and was released the same year in 2014. It follows the script for the TV series faithfully but with some added details.

A second novel written by Merlin P. Mann, taking place between season 1 and 2 will be published in November 2024.

In 2023, the series was renewed for a second season, which was released in December 2024.

A third season of the series titled Tidsrejsen: Arven efter Drago is in the works, set to be released in 2025.

== Plot ==
The first season is about the 13-year-old girl Sofie (Bebiane Ivalo Kreutzmann). Her greatest desire is that her parents, who had divorced after last year's Christmas, get back together so they can celebrate Christmas as a family.

On 1 December, Sofie's paternal grandfather gives Sofie a "calendar present" (kalendergave, a Nordic tradition) – an invention called a "gyro", which he wants her to finish building, and which under the right conditions can warp space and time, I.E. be used as a time machine. The same day Sofie is visited by the new boy in her class, Dixie (Hannibal Harbo Rasmussen). He seems to be unusually interested in the gyro, knows many things about Sofie that he can't possibly know, and is furthermore being chased by two secret agents.

One night, where Sofie wants to find out who Dixie is and what he wants with her, the secret agents follow after her to the shack where Dixie is staying, after which he has to escape. Sofie travels back to 1984 with him, where he tells her that he is from the future, and that the secrets agents are chasing him because time-travelling is illegal in the future. Furthermore, Sofie invented the time machine that people use in the future.

In 1984, Sofie takes the opportunity to change her parents' past, so that they will remain together in the present. However, this action ends up having dire consequences.

The second season takes place 10 years after the first season, this time Sofie works as a substitute teacher at the local school. A student at the school, 13 year old Romeo believes his father who he has never met is connected to time travel, and he also believes Sofie is connected to time travel.

Romeo decides to unravel the mystery and alongside his classmate Holly and Sofie, they travel through the medieval times, the 90s and the future.

However, this action also ends up having dire consequences.

The third season takes place 1 year after the second season, this time a young boy Laurentius Drago from 1425 has to save his father Count Drago from being burned by the evil Bishop Peder who plans to take over Dragør with his crazy philosophies. Laurentius receives help from his descendant Holly who has kept Sofies back-up Gyro, and they set out to battle Peder and his second in-command the knight Diderik.

== Cast ==
- Bebiane Ivalo Kreutzmann as Sofie Villadsen(season 1-2)
- Hannibal Harbo Rasmussen as Dixie(season 1)
- Lars Knutzon as Sofie's paternal grandfather (Alfred Villadsen)(season 1-2)
- Paw Henriksen as Grandfather Alfred from 1984 (season 1)
- Patricia Schumann as Camilla (Sofie's mother) (season 1)
- Amanda Rostgaard Phillipsen as Camilla from 1984 (season 1)
- Rolf Hansen as Henrik Villadsen (Sofie's father) (season 1)
- Arto Louis Eriksen as Henrik from 1984 (season 1)
- Jasper Møller Friis as Birk Villadsen (Sofie's little brother) (season 1)
- Karen-Lise Mynster as Sofie's paternal grandmother (Ruth Villadsen)
- Signe Skov as Ruth from 1984 (season 1)
- Kurt Ravn as Agent Grå (Agent Grey in English) (season 1-2)
- Sigurd Holmen le Dous as Agent Rød (Agent Red in English) (season 1-2)
- Stine Stengade as Agent Sort (alternative future Sofie, Agent Black in English) (season 1)
- Søren Pilmark as Sølvræven (the Silverfox in English) (season 1)
- Lucas Lynggaard Tønnesen as Oliver (season 1)
- Niels-Martin Eriksen as Ragnar (Sofie's school teacher and fanatical Christian) (season 1)
- William Rudbeck Lindhardt as Ragnar from 1984 (season 1)
- Liv Ingeborg Berg as Sofie og Dixie's daughter in 2044 (season 1)
- Fie London as Anna from 1984 (season 1)
- Signe Vaupel as Anna (Henrik's new girlfriend) (season 1)
- Thomas Kirk as School clerk (season 1)
- Robert Reinhold as Guldtand (Gold Tooth in English) (season 1)
- Robin Koch as Robin (season 1)
- Sonny Lahey as Computer voice
- Jonas Kriegbaum as Agent Brun (Agent Brown in English) (season 1)
- Susanne Storm as Esther (Sofie's maternal grandmother, also called Måneskin or Moonshine in English) (season 1)
- Lucas Munk Billing as Christmas tree salesman (season 1)
- Gry Guldager Jensen as School teacher (season 1)
- Johanne Bie as Emilie (Sofie's schoolmate) (season 1)
- Frederik Thoft as Romeo (season 2-3)
- Lise Baastrup as Emma (Romeo's Mother) (season 2)
- Michelle Bjørn Andersen as Lotte(Romeos Grandmother) (season 2)
- Anna Bruus Christensen as CEO (season 2)
- Lærke Krabbe De Waal as Holly (season 2-3)
- Morten Suurballe as Karl Storm(Hollys Grandfather) (season 2)
- Maximillian Henriques as Young Lacobus(1424)(season 2)
- Alexander Clement as Young Karl Storm(Hollys Grandfather from 1994) (season 2)
- Rasmus Hammerich as Count Drago(Hollys ancestor) (season 2-3)
- Sofia Nolsøe as Young Lotte(Romeos Grandmother from 1994) (season 2)
- Victor Madsen as Sunny (Hollys older brother) (season 2)
- Miley Millias as Paloma (Hollys younger sister) (season 2)
- Julian Brix as Laurentius Drago(Hollys ancestor) (season 2-3)
- Andreas Jebro as Asger (Hollys father) (season 2)
- Emilie Ullerup Mørkøv as Helene (Hollys mother)(season 2)
- Princess Josephine as Kate(season 2)
- Kristian Gintberg as Fyrst Dragos servant (season 2)
- Jonas Madsen as Commercial Director (season 2)
- Kenneth M. Christensen as Lacobus(Romeos father) (season 2)
- Mads Kruse as Nielsen 2035 (season 2)
- Ernesto Piga Carbone as Olsson 2019 (season 2)
- David Garmark as Rohde 1984 (season 2)
- Mikkel Baden Jensen as Henrik Delurant (season 2)
- Louis Christopher Kamradt as Oste-Tom (season 2)
- Mads Hjulmand as Tidsturist (season 2)
- Mathilde Passer aa Tidsturist (season 2)
- Kanya N. Rørbech as Pedagogue (season 2)
- Magnus Reinert Gásadal as Peitur (season 2)
- Lea Kampmann as Annika (season 2)
- Ida Skelbæk-Knudsen as Miss Sculabia(season 2-3)
- Caspar Phillipson as Bishop Peder (season 3)
- Youssef Wayne Hvidtfeldt as Diderik (Knight) (season 3)
- Adam Eiberg Kastaniegaard as Django (season 3)
- Morten Christensen as The King(season 3)

== Production ==
Tidsrejsen is written by Poul Berg and directed by Kaspar Munk and is based on a concept developed by Nordisk Film TV A/S by Peter Hansen, Adam Neutzsky-Wulff, Philip LaZebnik and Lars Feilberg. When the main characters travel back in time to 1984, several things appear and/or are referenced from Danish 80's culture, including the use of the song Dig og mig by Dieters Lieder and references to the disk jockey Kim Schumacher.

The sound designer, Peter Albrechtsen, helped to create most of the sound for the series from scratch. For the technology that came from the future of 2044 he used many bird calls, warping them to sound like computerized sounds, and many sounds from NASA's archive on SoundCloud was also used. Almost all foaly was created by Finnish Heikki Kossi.

The series is primarily filmed in Dragør over the course of seven months. The theme song of the Christmas calendar is sung by Caroline Castell.

In 2024 the theme song was remade for the second season, once again sung by Caroline Castell and this time also featuring and co-written by Jonah Blacksmith, a danish folk-rock band from Northjutland.

== Episodes ==
No.	Title	Original release date
1	"Blind date (English: Blind Date)"	1 December 2014
Sofie's parents are divorced, and her biggest wish is that they get back together so that they can celebrate Christmas together like they did the year prior when they were not divorced. Sofie is given a gyro by her paternal grandfather, for them to finish building together. The gyro is a form of time machine. Sofie has created internet dating profiles for both of her parents to set them up on blind dates, but secretly it's with each other – another one of her attempts to get them back together. On the same day a new boy start in Sofie's class at school. The boy's name is Dixie, and he knows a lot of things about Sofie which he can't possibly know.
2	"Hvem er Dixie? (English: Who is Dixie?)"	2 December 2014
Sofie finds out that Dixie appears in one of her video recordings from last year's Christmas, however he's never appeared in it before so Sofie decides to find out what he wants with her. At the same time Sofie has to decide where she and Birk gets to celebrate Christmas. And this preferably before her father, Henrik, falls for the new and sweet neighbor, Anna, who Henrik used to know 30 years before.
3	"Kærlighed på formel (English: The Love Formula)"	3 December 2014
Sofie and Dixie has to do a project for school, and Sofie has the idea of using brain chemistry to make her parents fall in love again. She tries out the experiment on two of her classmates in school before doing it with her parents. Somehow it works with the classmates but not with her parents. Meanwhile, Dixie is being chased by some mysterious secret agents.
4	"Tiden står stille (English: Time Stands Still)"	4 December 2014
Sofie works on the gyro, and when she connects it to a battery she has been given by Dixie, it suddenly causes time to freeze. Dixie is on the run from two secret agents from the future, who wants to take him back to the future to imprison him in a military-like re-educational institution.
5	"Fanvæg (English: Fan Wall)"	5 December 2014
Sofie discovers that Dixie has made a bulletin board with images from her life. Sofie tries to convince everybody of the fact that Dixie is insane, as he knows things about her that he can't possibly know. Because of this, Dixie secretly places the bulletin board inside of her room at her father's house, causing the accusations to be directed back at Sofie herself.
6	"Da far var dreng (English: When Dad was a Kid)"	6 December 2014
Sofie goes to Dixie to find out what he wants with her. He tells her that he wants fuel for his own gyro, before it runs out. The secret agents show up and chases them, so they attempt to flee. Sofie messes with the controls on Dixie's ATV time machine, which causes it to send Dixie and Sofie back to the year 1984.
7	"Sølvræven (English: The Silver Fox)"	7 December 2014
The gyro has stopped working because it lacks fuel. Because of this, Dixie and Sofie are trapped in 1984. Dixie has been hurt, and Sofie forces him to tell him the story of who he is, where he is from, and about how he met Sølvræven (lit. the Silver Fox, the most infamous time traveller in 2044).
8	"Jeg hedder Sofie, farfar (English: My Name's Sofie, Granddad)"	8 December 2014
Sofie and Dixie have to make the gyro work, so that Sofie can return to 2014. For this reason Sofie decides to visit the young version of her paternal grandfather. As the initial inventor of the gyro, he is the only one who can help them. Eventually, Sofie meets her mother and father when they were 13 years old, and who haven't started dating yet.
9	"Måneskin (English: Moonshine or Moonlight)"	9 December 2014
Sofie and her grandfather finds out that the gyro requires a rare mineral to work, one only found in meteorites. Sofie remembers that her mother has a small meteorite in a necklace which she uses in her astrology, and which her mother's mother owns in 1984. Sofie has never met her maternal grandmother before, as she died before Sofie was born. The grandmother calls herself Måneskin (lit. Moonshine or Moonlight), and she casts Sofie's horoscope while Dixie steals the meteorite, which Sofie's mother Camilla had been given by Måneskin. However, after they leave Sofie realizes the wrongness of the action and tries to return the meteorite necklace to her grandmother, only for Måneskin to refuse to take it back as she senses that Sofie needs it for a special purpose.
10	"Sneboldeffekten (English: The Snow Ball Effect)"	10 December 2014
Sofie accidentally changes her father Henrik's past too much, causing him to lay eyes on another girl, Anna, instead of Sofie's mother, Camilla. For this reason, Sofie and Dixie has to change it back, so that Henrik and Camilla get together, before Sofie and Dixie travels back to 2014. Meanwhile, Sofie's younger grandfather helps them in getting the gyro to work again.
11	"Lucia/Nitroglycerin (English: Lucia/Nitroglycerine)"	11 December 2014
Sofie's grandfather has found out that the gyro needs an explosive to work. His choice falls on nitroglycerine, which can be found in the locked physics classroom at the town's local school. Sofie and Dixie have to steal it, while a Lucia Parade (a Nordic tradition) is taking place in the school, where Sofie's mother is the Lucia Bride (meaning she portrays Saint Lucia). Sofie tries, in the hopes of getting her parents back together in 2014, to get her father to see the parade instead of going to try out for the band that he became a member of in 1984. Sofie's mother is happy when she sees that Sofie's father, Henrik, came to watch the parade as he'd promised her, and they kiss. Meanwhile the agents from the future are close to tracking down Sofie and Dixie. In the end, they manage to leave the school without the agents seeing them, and outside Sofie's grandfather is waiting with the ATV and gyro. He adds the stolen nitroglycerine and they travel back to 2014.
12	"Har vi hund? (English: Do We Have a Dog?)"	12 December 2014
After Sofie and Dixie escaped the agents in 1984 and returned to 2014, Sofie's parents are not divorced anymore, which makes Sofie happy. However Sofie slowly realizes that her little brother, Birk, doesn't exist anymore. Instead the family has a dog named Birk. Her mother is also not an astrologer anymore, but a cosmetologist, and her father works at an office. Sofie's decision to change the past has resulted in her own present being changed in a way that Sofie cannot bear.
13	"Askesky (English: Ash Cloud)"	13 December 2014
Sofie's parents have never had Sofie's little brother Birk, after Sofie and Dixie changed the past. Additionally, the gyro has broken down and has to be fixed so that she and Dixie can return to 1984 and rewrite history. Sofie's parents, however, surprises Sofie with a two-week trip to Gran Canaria which they have to leave for in a few hours, which doesn't please Sofie in the slightest. Because of this, Sofie hacks into the local radio and uses Dixie's future voice changer to say that an ash cloud has caused all plane departures to be cancelled, so that the family won't leave. However during dinner, the local radio station reports that someone hacked their radio to run the false news story, causing her parents to suspect Sofie of having been the hacker, knowing that she has great abilities in science and technology, and because she often gets up to "crazy experiments" and the like. They also suspect that Dixie might have been a factor in this action, thinking that he has been a bad influence on her. To save Sofie from the accusations, Dixie shows up at the house to claim responsibility for the hacking of the radio station, lying about having done it because he's fallen in love with Sofie and didn't want her to leave. After Dixie leaves, Sofie's parents forbid her from seeing him anymore, which simply angers Sofie even more.
14	"På flugt (English: Fugitives)"	14 December 2014
The agents have located Sofie and Dixie and are about to take Dixie as prisoner. For this reason Dixie and Sofie hide themselves in a boatyard shack at Dragør harbour so that Sofie can fix the gyro. Dixie and Sofie start bonding when the severity of the situation dawns on Sofie. Dixie calms down Sofie. They then sit in the boat in the shack, where Sofie is touching a star on one of the walls of the boat, and Dixie asks if she thinks it looks beautiful, to which Sofie nods. Shortly afterwards Dixie kisses Sofie, then apologizes and gets up and walks outside and into a toilet nearby. Dixie thinks that his kiss was awkward, however Sofie is obviously happy about it, smiling. However, Dixie is thinking about leaving, remembering Sølvræven's advice of "Never looking back", and is angry at himself with falling for Sofie "of all women in the world." Then both of them sleep. Dixie wakes up in the middle of the night when the gyro begins to glow again, indicating it works. While Sofie is still asleep, Dixie sneaks out to the ATV with the gyro, because the agents have found them. Sofie wakes up and runs out, just as Dixie is getting on the ATV and is ready to drive away. He then leaves and travels through time, much to Sofie's protest who screams in anguish.
15	"Se dig aldrig tilbage (English: Never Look Back)"	15 December 2014
Dixie has travelled back to 2044 and left Sofie in 2014. He wants to ask Sølvræven for advice as to whether he did the right thing in leaving Sofie, or if he should return to her. However, there is one problem, which is that Sølvræven is imprisoned at the headquarters of Tempus, the Danish government's secret anti-time travel police unit. With help from his old friend Guldtand (lit. Gold Tooth), Dixie manages to break into Sølvræven's cell. Sølvræven advises Dixie against going back to Sofie, because he doesn't believe love is worth risking everything for. But Dixie then gets a piece of advice from Guldtand, who claims that love is in fact something worth risking everything for. Based on this, Dixie decides to return to 2014.
16	"Husarrest (English: Grounded)"	16 December 2014
Dixie has returned to 2014. And while Sofie feels that Dixie failed her, she accepts his offer of help in getting her little brother Birk back. Sofie's father, thinking that the boy Dixie has been a bad influence of Sofie, sets up burglar alarms on all windows of the house, so that Sofie cannot run away. But Sofie and Dixie get help from Sofie's paternal grandfather to escape, so that they can travel back to 1984.
17	"Dig & mig (English: You & ME)"	17 December 2014
Sofie and Dixie travel back to 1984 to make the 13-year-old Henrik play music once more, in an attempt to get Sofie's little brother Birk back into existence in 2014, thinking that their various changes might have caused a butterfly effect. They make Ragnar, who is Sofie's mean and fanatical Christian school teacher in 2014, to leave the band as guitarist, by telling on his parents. Ragnar's parents run the local private church, and believes that pop music is the work of the Devil. For this reason, Henrik gets to join the band and play at the school's Christmas concert, where they sing the 1980s hit song Dig og mig (originally created by the band Dieters Lieder, while in the series it's written by Henrik.)
18	"Stjernetegn (English: Zodiac)"	18 December 2014
As Sofie and Dixie have made Henrik play music once more, it's time to change Sofie's mother Camilla's future, by making her believe in zodiacs and astrology once more. Together with Sofie's past paternal grandfather, Sofie and Dixie make a false newspaper with a horoscope that they want to make Camilla believe in. However, the plan goes awry. Coincidently, Sofie accidentally leaves her bag unattended, only for Ragnar to look through and discover Sofie's local history book from 2014. Camilla believes that Sofie is her family's guardian angel. But it turns out that she does in fact still believe in astrology, meaning the plan might have worked after all. Soon after Henrik shows up and he and Camilla walk up the stairs. After the two lovers leave, Måneskin tells Sofie that she somehow knows that Sofie is in fact her granddaughter. When Sofie and Dixie travel back to 2014, Ragnar secretly watches them leave. they find that Birk is back and in bed before going to bed themselves.
19	"Guds anden søn (English: God's Other Son)"	19 December 2014
Sofie wakes up the next morning to Birk eating breakfast, and her mother, who is divorced again. Sofie's mother then prepares for "the congregation", which confuses Sofie. She rushes to tell Dixie about this, and they go outside only to see that all of the town's christmas decoration is gone. They head to the school to see Ragnar giving prayers to a large crowd. Ragnar informs the two that they are late before beginning his speech about how he is God's other son, while Henrik, Sofie's father, plays an electric church organ. Ragnar then claims that god is unsatisfied, and that he demands the deeds to the people's houses, before reciting a mantra and offering the lord's protection for a small donation at the exit. In the queue, Sofie asks her mother if she believes in Ragnar, to which she responds that all of his "prophecies" have come true. Right before their turn, Sofie and Dixie leave the queue to talk to Sofie's dad, however Sofie's mother returns with Ragnar who demands they come to his office. In the office, Ragnar is interrupted by something, so he must leave the office shortly. Sofie takes a look at the wall, which is filled with newspapers of "Ragnar's prophecies and predictions coming true". In reality, he had been using the local history book he had stolen from Sofie in 1984 to "predict" the future and gain power. But since the book was from 2014, that means the only way for Ragnar to keep prophesizing future events is to travel to the future himself. Ragnar then returns and begins talking about how they were the reason he couldn't perform at the Christmas concert in 1984. Ragnar stands up to open a safe in the corner of the room with Sofie's history book, now old and damaged. Ragnar then demands to know where the ATV is. Dixie starts lying about how securely it's hidden before Ragnar looks out the window and spots the ATV parked behind a wall. Ragnar demands the key, but Dixie dangles a fake key out of the window teasingly before dropping it. Ragnar calls for someone, likely a worker, to lock the door and keep an eye on them before leaving the room. Dixie uses his futuristic voice changer to trick that person to open the door and let them escape. Outside, Ragnar is moving the ATV somewhere when he realizes Sofie and Dixie have escaped. Suddenly, Sofie's paternal grandfather pulls up in his car behind them, and they rush inside and drive away before being caught. In the workshop, Sofie asks how he knew where they were, to which he responded that Henrik called and said they were in danger. Sofie's paternal grandfather asks about the gyro, and Sofie says Ragnar has it. Then Henrik comes in and Sofie asks what he was doing with Ragnar, to which Henrik assures Sofie that he hasn't been brainwashed. Henrik starts explaining the story behind Ragnar's rise. Meanwhile in Ragnar's garage, Ragnar is looking around the ATV before laughing maniacally.
20	"Ragnarok"	20 December 2014
Sofie and Dixie and all of Sofie's family start making a plan to usurp Ragnar. He controls and oppresses the entire town with his false prophecies and now wants all the houses from the citizens. Since Ragnar has gotten a hold of the gyro and the ATV, they need to work quick because Ragnar might be planning to take over the world, not just the town. Sofie, Dixie and Sofie's family tricks Ragnar into admitting to the town's people that he simply enjoys the power and wants to throw the people out of their houses. This makes the townspeople upset and they demand to get their houses and money back. Ragnar almost manages to leave on the ATV when he gets a hold of the key to the ATV, however he is stopped before he can manage to do so.
21	"Jeg er ikke din søster (English: I'm Not Your Sister)"	21 December 2014
Sofie and Dixie travels back to 1984 and fixes the past so that Ragnar is made a member of Henrik's band, which, as Sofie and Dixie returns to 2014, has changed the present so that Ragnar's fanatical sect doesn't come into existence. Henrik has gotten the old band back together and has been asked by the town to perform "Dig og mig" at a concert in the town square, where Ragnar, now a happy man, plays guitar next to Henrik. Dixie agrees to go to the concert with Sofie. After the concert, it is time to say goodbye, but it is hard for Sofie and Dixie as they have started to have feelings for each other. Sofie asks Dixie how she can send him messages to tell him how she is, and Dixie shows her a hidden compartment behind a sign on the wall of one of the old boat shacks in the harbour, which he's used many times already. As a way to remember him, Dixie gives Sofie a necklace which carries the star from the wall of the boat in the boatyard shack that he and Sofie hid in previously. Sofie walks back into her house, but then runs into the house, slamming the door and tearfully proclaims how stupid she was for not asking Dixie to stay. Meanwhile the Tempus agents are waiting to capture Dixie, waiting for Sofie to leave before doing so. The agents are not alone this time, having brought the leader of the agency, "Agent Sort" (lit. Agent Black). Sofie however decides to run back outside to stop Dixie, only to see him being taken into the agents' black van. She then meets Agent Sort, who tells Sofie that she is her from 30 years into the future. Sofie is upset, as she doesn't want to turn into the woman before her, and she also finds it hard to forgive Dixie for knowing who'd she turn into in the future without telling her. Since the agents has taken the ATV with the original gyro back to 2044, Sofie only has the gyro from 2044 to take her frustrations out on. Before she can destroy it, her grandfather however convinces her that she decides her own fate and who she will become, and that she can change her own future for this reason. He also convinces her that she has to fix the gyro from the future so that she can save Dixie. She then gets to work on the gyro.
22	"Frit fald (English: Free Fall)"	22 December 2014
Sofie has come to her senses after the shock of seeing her future self as a cynical and oppressive woman. Because of this she decides to save Dixie, and to this purpose she fixes Dixie's old gyro from the future. Since the agents have taken the ATV, she has to figure out another way of getting enough acceleration for the gyro to create the time-leap. For this reason she decides to jump from the rooftop of the only boat-tower at the harbour, despite her fear of heights. Her grandfather helps her accomplishing this task, a bit unwillingly as he is afraid she will be injured. With her jump, Sofie manages to travel to 2044, but the gyro she brought, the one Dixie used to own, breaks down shortly afterwards. Sofie then walks towards the city beyond Dragør, towards the underground part where most people live in the future.
23	"Fanget i fremtiden (English: Trapped in the Future)"	23 December 2014
Sofie has travelled to the year 2044 to rescue Dixie from Tempus. With help from Guldtand she sneaks into Tempus' prison cell department and rescues Dixie, which Agent Grå and Agent Rød discovers. The agents manage to capture Sofie and Dixie, and while the agents take Dixie away to finally give him over to an institution Sofie is taken to Agent Sort's office. As Dixie gets away, Agent Sort is forced to leave the office. Meanwhile, Sofie uses her the hand-scanner on Agent Sort's computer desk, and the voice changer Dixie used to own to change her voice to Agent Sort's, to release Sølvræven from his cell.
24	"En ny tid (English: A New Time)"	24 December 2014
Sofie is at Agent Sort's office while Dixie is on his way to a secure institution. Agent Sort wants Sofie (and thus herself) to forget everything about Dixie, so Agent Sort lures Sofie into a memory scanner machine that she can use to alter their memories. Sofie convinces Agent Sort that she is simply afraid of feeling love, and that she remembers what it was like to be in love with Dixie. Thus Agent Sort finally lets Sofie go so that she can save Dixie. Meanwhile, Dixie has escaped from Agent Grå and Agent Rød with the help of Sølvræven, which Sofie had managed to release from his cell from Agent Sort's office computer controls. Dixie convinces Sofie that it is too dangerous for them to stay together so uses the ATV to travel back to 2014 alone. In 2014 Sofie celebrates Christmas with her parents, Birk, and her paternal grandfather and grandmother. In 2044 Dixie manages to steal the agents' gyro and destroy it. The agents confesses that it is their last gyro. In 2014, Sofie uses the key to the ATV to make it invisible after parking it at the harbour, and then hides the key in the compartment that Dixie had showed her in the wall of one of the boat shacks. In the future, Dixie finds the key and the ATV, and returns to her in 2014. She is reunited in a heartfelt with him at the door of her grandparents' and father's house, after which they decide to destroy the original gyro so that it will not be invented and thus abused in the future. Then they share two romantic kisses with one another and Dixie celebrates Christmas with Sofie's family. The episode then cuts to the future of 2044 where Sofie, 30 years older, is still together with Dixie and they have a daughter (called Liv in the book version). Sofie has told the daughter the whole story of how she and the daughter's father (Dixie) met, and tells her that the whole family is on their way to the house, because even though her parents never got back together, the family still celebrate Christmas together every year. According to the book version, Dixie moved into the basement under the grandparents' house to begin with, Henrik got together with Anna, and Camilla found a boyfriend through the internet dating profile that Sofie had made for her.

== Reception ==
Politiken gave Tidsrejsen 5 out of six hearts, writing that the series is suspenseful and have a good plot. Politiken believes that it is alright for a children and young adult's TV series to seriously deal with present time culture in regards to divorce and how children view them in divorced families. On average, 1.02 million people watched Tidsrejsen, and had a viewership of about 47%, which made it the most successful Nordic Christmas calendar in Danish television in 11 years.

Tidsrejsen was criticised for its portrayal of the school teacher Ragnar, the only apparently Christian character, as a nasty and condescending type of person, and a fanatic, who wants to prevent scientific progression. Some people did not believe Christianity was taken seriously by the Danish Broadcasting Corporation. This view was shared by both Pernille Vigsø Bagge from the Socialist People's Party and Charlotte Dyremose, church spokesperson of the Conservative Party. However, DR producer Piv Bernth commented that the character was obviously a caricature in a series that is already fantastical, and that he develops from a fraud into a kind man throughout the series.

=== Awards ===
Tidsrejsen won the prize for "Best short format television series" at the Robert Awards in 2015.

== See also ==
- List of Christmas films
