= Into the Darkness (film) =

2020 Danish drama film

- Directed by: Anders Refn
- Starring: Jesper Christensen; Bodil Jørgensen
- Release date: 9 January 2020
- Running time: 152 minutes
- Country: Denmark
- Language: Danish

Into the Darkness (Danish: De forbandede år – "the cursed years") is a 2020 Danish drama film directed by Anders Refn. It is the first of two films following the members of the Skov family as they live through the first years of Denmark's involvement in World War II, from the German invasion in April 1940 until the end of 1942 and the imminent defeat of Axis forces engaged in the Battle of Stalingrad in the Soviet Union. The sequel Out of the Darkness depicts the family as it navigates the later years of the war.

The film depicts the owners of a Copenhagen electronics factory, Karl and Eva Skov and their children as they follow disparate paths, including Karl's and Eva's efforts to keep the factory open to provide for its employees while avoiding collaboration with Germany; their daughter marrying a German Navy officer; one son joining the pro-Nazi Free Corps Denmark in order to fight Communism and another participating in a Communist-aligned cell of the Danish resistance movement.

== Cast ==
- Jesper Christensen - Karl Skov
- Bodil Jørgensen - Eva Skov
- Julie Agnete Vang - Agnes
- Sara Bjerregaard Christensen - Helene Skov
- Patricia Schumann - Louise
- Mikael Birkkjær - Stenhanne
- Tommy Kenter - Director Berg
