= Frits Helmuth =

Danish actor (1931–2004)

- Born: 3 July 1931; Copenhagen, Denmark
- Died: 12 December 2004 (aged 73); Copenhagen, Denmark
- Occupation: Actor
- Years active: 1938–2004

Frits Helmuth (3 July 1931 – 12 December 2004) was a Danish film actor. He appeared in 60 films between 1938 and 2004. He was born and died in Copenhagen, Denmark. He was the son of Osvald Helmuth and is the father of Mikael Helmuth and Pusle Helmuth.

== Selected filmography ==
- Blaavand melder storm (1938) – Jens Olesen som barn
- Ebberød Bank (1943) – Vipperups søn
- Frihed, lighed og Louise (1944) – Peter Kildal
- Hans store aften (1946) – Egon
- Ta' Pelle med (1952) – Arbejder på mejeriet
- My Son Peter (1953) – Peter
- The Son (1953) – Simon
- Kongeligt besøg (1954) – Erik
- Det er så yndigt at følges ad (1954) – Lasse
- Den kloge mand (1956) – Ulf Thomsen
- Ung leg (1956) – Benny
- Jeg elsker dig (1957) – David
- Styrmand Karlsen (1958) – Styrmand Knud Karlsen
- De sjove år (1959) – Jens Birk
- Skibet er ladet med (1960) – Max Ibsen
- Eventyrrejsen (1960) – Gustav Hollstrøm
- Duellen (1962) – Mikael
- Prinsesse for en dag (1962) – Teaterdirektør Jan Forsing
- Tine (1964) – Løjtnant Appel
- Halløj i himmelsengen (1965) – Pierre de Sauterne (voice, uncredited)
- A Farmer's Life (1965) – Frantz von Rambow
- Stormvarsel (1968) – Kurt Vinderup
- Løgneren (1970) – Johannes Vig
- Per (1975) – Helge Lorentzen
- Kun sandheden (1975) – Kriminalassistent Mørck
- Fru Inger til Østråt (1975) – Nils Lykke
- Lille spejl (1978) – Bent
- Hvem myrder hvem? (1978)
- Johnny Larsen (1979) – Johnnys father
- Skal vi danse først? (1979) – Susannes Dad
- Ulvetid (1981) – Tom
- Forræderne (1983) – Dr. Bachmann
- In the Middle of the Night (1984) – J.O. Kurtzen
- Waltzing Regitze (1989) – Karl Aage (Regitze's Husband)
- Høfeber (1991) – Dommeren
- Stolen Spring (1993) – Lektor Blomme
- Carl, My Childhood Symphony (1994) – Outzen
- 1996: Pust på meg! (1997) – Bestefar
- A Place Nearby (2000) – Jespersen
- Flickering Lights (2000) – Carl
- Villa Paranoia (2004) – Walentin
- Oskar & Josefine (2005) – Doktor Dinesen
