= Crash (Danish TV series) =

- Title
- Written by: Carsten Overskov
- Directed by: Carsten Overskov
- Starring: see below
- Narrated by: Torben Hundahl
- Country of origin: Denmark
- Original language: Danish
- No. of seasons: 1
- No. of episodes: 13

Production
- Producer: Carsten Overskov
- Cinematography: Frode Jensen

Original release
- Release: 6 January 1984

Crash – Truslen fra det sorte hul ("Crash – The Menace from the Black Hole") is a 1984 Danish children's science fiction TV-series which was written, directed and produced by Carsten Overskov and starred Lars Ranthe.

== Broadcast history ==
Crash was produced and broadcast by the Danish Broadcasting Corporation and was also broadcast by the Norwegian Broadcasting Corporation in Norway and by Sveriges Television in Sweden in summer 1985. It was a major production but was not successful in Denmark.

Carsten Overskov published a book called Truslen fra det sorte hul, also in 1984.

Some 20 years after the broadcast DR was given means to digitalize the series along with other Danish productions such as Tonny Toupé Show, Casper og Mandrilaftalen and Gotha.

== Plot ==
The main character in the series is ten-year-old Birger, who collects the comic book series Thunderboy. When his parents discover one day that the first issue is worth 10,000 kroner, the family searches the entire house for his copy but fails to find it. In frustration, Birger kicks the furniture in his room and discovers that the room functions as a spaceship. He takes off, and in outer space discovers a supervillain named Barry Slisk, who had stolen his comic book. Slisk has his hideout in a black hole and Birger must try to thwart his evil plans. In the course of doing so he meets a beautiful girl named Iris, who helps him.

== Cast ==
- Lars Ranthe as Birger
- Anne Marie Helger as mother
- Peter Steen as father
- Jeannie Mortensen as Iris
- Jacob Christensen as Barry Slisk
- Ib Thykier
- Torben Hundahl
- Niels Skousen

== Episodes ==
Episodes

1. Et spark opad (6 January 1984)
2. Suget fra det sorte hul (13 January 1984)
3. Den store plan (20 January 1984)
4. Den plagede planet (27 January 1984)
5. Det store offer (3 February 1984)
6. Et spring i døden (10 February 1984)
7. Massakren (17 February 1984)
8. En viking i skabet (24 February 1984)
9. Rejsen ind i det sorte hul (03 Mars 1984)
10. Den vilde jagt (10 Mars 1984)
11. Robotternes skæbnetime (17 Mars 1984)
12. Hvem myrder hvem? (24 Mars 1984)
13. Opgøret (31 Mars 1984)
