= Sunes familie =

1997 film

- Directed by: Hans Kristensen
- Screenplay by: Hans Kristensen; Thorvald Lervad; John Stefan Olsen
- Based on: Sune books by Anders Jacobsson and Sören Olsson
- Release date: 10 October 1997 (Denmark)
- Country: Denmark
- Language: Danish

Sunes familie is a Danish children's and family comedy that premiered in Denmark on 10 October 1997.

The film is a Danish adaptation of the film Sune's Summer, focusing more on the book rather than the Swedish film. The family's last name was changed from Andersson to Andersen and their first names were changed from Anna to Anne, Isabelle to Isabel, Håkan to Håkon. Sune's girlfriend Sophie is instead called Sofie. Locations were also changed so that the family is living Denmark instead of Sweden.

== Actors ==
- Claus Bue
- Vibeke Hastrup
- Per Damgaard Hansen
- Sofie Lassen-Kahlke
- Niels Anders Thorn
- Inge Sofie Skovbo
- Stephanie Leon
- Erni Arneson
- Joachim Knop
- Jarl Friis-Mikkelsen
- Henrik Lykkegaard
- Anders Nyborg
- Mari-Anne Jespersen
- Peter Jorde
- Susan Olsen
- Folmer Rubæk
- Bodil Jørgensen
- Jarl Forsman
- Jan Hertz
- Hans Henrik Voetmann
