= De sjove år =

1959 film by Palle Kjærulff-Schmidt

- Theatrical poster by Aage Lundvald
- Directed by: Palle Kjærulff-Schmidt
- Written by: Klaus Rifbjerg; Palle Kjærulff-Schmidt
- Produced by: Lau Lauritzen Jr.
- Starring: Frits Helmuth; Ghita Nørby; Ebbe Langberg; Malene Schwartz
- Cinematography: Rudolf Frederiksen
- Music by: Sven Gyldmark
- Production company: ASA
- Distributed by: ASA Filmudlejning
- Release date: 1 September 1959 (Denmark)
- Running time: 99 min
- Country: Denmark
- Language: Danish

De sjove år is a Danish 1959 comedy film directed by Palle Kjærulff-Schmidt and starring Frits Helmuth, Ghita Nørby, Ebbe Langberg, Malene Schwartz.

== Cast ==
- Frits Helmuth
- Ghita Nørby
- Ebbe Langberg
- Malene Schwartz
- Ellen Winther
- Jens Østerholm
- Preben Kaas
- Gerda Madsen
- Clara Pontoppidan
- Helge Kjærulff-Schmidt
- Kirsten Walther
