= Niels Andersen (actor) =

Danish actor (born 1942)

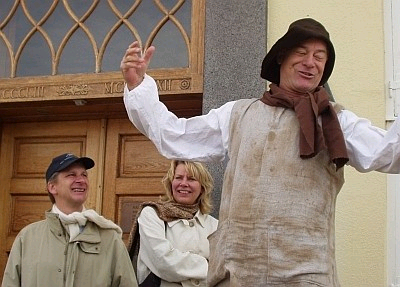
- Andersen in 2010
- Born: 7 August 1942 (age 83)
- Occupation: Actor
- Years active: 1971–1992

Niels Andersen (born 7 August 1942) is a Danish actor.

== Selected filmography ==
- Hannah med H (2003)
- Tomorrow My Love (1971)
