= Torben Hundahl =

Danish actor

- Born: 16 June 1945
- Died: 2 October 1989 (aged 44)
- Other name: Torben Hundal
- Occupation: Actor

Torben Hundahl (16 June 1945 – 2 October 1989), sometimes credited as Torben Hundal, was a Danish film and television actor.

== Career ==
=== Partial filmography ===
- Dangerous Summer (1969)
- Tintomara (1970)
- The Happiness Cage (1972)
- Revolutionen i Vandkanten (1972)
- The Vicar of Vejlby (1972)
- Z.P.G. (1972)
- The Escape (1973)
- Kun Sandheden (1975)
- The Gangster's Apprentice (1976)
- Hvem Myrder Hvem? (1978)
- Lille Spejl (1978)
- Krigernes Børn (1979)
- Kidnapning (1982)

=== Partial television work ===
- Mildest talt (1969)
- Ved du Hvad du Skulle? Gifte Dig Med Tulle! (1970)
- Jonas (1971)
- Hvornår dør Maria? (1972)
- Privatlivets Fred (1973)
- Crash (1984)
