= Andy Pape (composer) =

Danish composer

Andrew Jacob Pape (born September 1, 1955) is an American-born Danish composer.

== Biography ==
Pape was born in September 1, 1955 in Los Angeles, California. While a teenager he moved to Denmark in 1971. From 1975 to 1977 he studied musicology at the University of Copenhagen, and subsequently pursued private studies in music composition with Svend Aaquist and Hans Abrahamsen. He pursued formal training in music composition with Ib Nørholm at the Royal Danish Academy of Music (RDAM); graduating from there with a diploma in 1985. While a student at RDAM he was concurrently employed as a music teacher in Copenhagen at the Bernadotte School (Danish: Bernadotteskolen).

Pape was the recipient of two three-year long scholarships/grants awarded by the Danish Arts Foundation in 1985 and 1993. Prior to becoming a full time composer, he was the head of the music department at the Kunsthøjskolen i Holbæk (English: Folk Art School in Holbæk; sometimes given as College of Art) from 1987 to 1993. He composed the music for the films Carl, My Childhood Symphony (1994) and En loppe kan også gø (1996). The Copenhagen-based opera company Den Anden Opera toured his chamber opera Houdini the Great to the Miller Theatre at Columbia University in 1999; a work using a libretto by Erik Clausen which was originally performed under its Danish title, Houdini den store, at the Royal Danish Theatre (RDT) in 1988.

Pape's second opera Bokseren (English: The Boxer) also used a libretto by Clausen. It was also staged at the RDT after its premiere in Aarhus in 1995. His third opera, Dronningen af Blåtårn, was about Princess Leonora Christina Ulfeldt. It was premiered by the Den Anden Opera in 1999. He has subsequently the operas: Till Death Us Do, Simsalabad, and Andre Bygninger (2014). His instrumental music has also experimented with the theatrical as in Variations on ‘Nearer my God to Thee (1990) which requires the pianist to act as if intoxicated while being assisted by a malicious page turner.

== Partial list of compositions ==
- Clarino Concerto for piccolo trumpet and orchestra (1990)
- Scherzo Animalesco for two pianos, two trumpets, horns, and orchestra (1994)
- Concerto grosso for recorder, cello, tuba and orchestra (1996)
