= Patricia Schumann =

Danish actress (born 1975)

- Born: 4 June 1975 (age 51)
- Occupation: Actress
- Years active: 1994–present
- Spouse: Thomas Bo Larsen (m. 2001)
- Awards: Bodil Award for Best Actress in a Supporting Role (Sofie in Submarino)

Patricia Schumann (born 4 June 1975) is a Danish actress. She graduated from the Danish National School of Theatre and Contemporary Dance in 2005.

== Filmography ==
Year	Title
1994	Vildbassen
2007	Island of Lost Souls
2007	De unge år
2008	Preludium
2009	Profetia
2010	Submarino
2010	Hold Me Tight
2013	The Keeper of Lost Causes
2016	Shelley
2019	Valhalla
2020	Into the Darkness
2021	The Shadow in My Eye
2022	Bethlehem Night

=== TV series ===
Year	Title
2008	Sommer
2008	Lulu & Leon
2009	Thea og leoparden
2009	Park Road
2010	Borgen
2011	Those Who Kill
2012	Dicte
2012	Rita
2013	Rytteriet 2
2014	Tidsrejsen
2017	Ride Upon the Storm (Danish: Herrens Veje)
2018	The Bridge 4
