= Anne Marie Helger =

Danish actress and performer

- Born: 12 February 1946 (age 80); Charlottenlund, Denmark
- Occupation: Actress

Anne Marie Helger (born 12 February 1946) is a Danish theatre, films and television actress and performer.

== Style and work ==
In Denmark, Helger is well known for her activism, political satire and engagement in numerous humanitarian projects. Helger's work for the Danish HIV-AIDS movement is among her most notable of these.

Helger attended the Aalborg Theatre school, but did not finish the education. In the 1960s she became a member of the travelling street theatre group Solvognen (The Sun Chariot), and later in the 1970s Debatteatret (The Debate-theatre).

Helger is known for her many flamboyant dresses, make-up and jewellery, but not exclusively, as she has also performed in classical theatre plays and on television. Helger has worked closely with Danish actor and performer Peter Larsen in various projects.

== Selected filmography ==
- Strømer (Cop) (1976)
- Nyt Legetøj (1977)
- The Heritage (Danish: Slægten) (1978)
- Johnny Larsen (1979)
- Kniven i Hjertet (1981)
- Koks i Kulissen (1983)
- Crash (1984)
- Sidste Akt (1987)
- Himmel og Helvede (1988)
- De Frigjorte (1993)
- Viktor og Viktoria (1993)
- Cirkus Ildebrand (1995)
- Fru Eilersen og Mehmet (2006)

== TV-series ==
- Y's Fantom Farmor (1996)

== Music/Audiobooks ==
- Max & Antonette (1988)
- The Wind in the Willow (2006)

== Sources ==
- Kvinfo: Anne Marie Helger (1946 - ) Dansk Kvindebiografisk Leksikon (in Danish)
