= Temporary Release =

2007 film

- Directed by: Erik Clausen
- Written by: Erik Clausen
- Produced by: Peter Ingemann
- Starring: Erik Clausen
- Cinematography: Rasmus Videbæk
- Edited by: Anders Refn
- Music by: Kim Larsen
- Distributed by: Nordisk Film
- Release date: 12 January 2007
- Running time: 90 minutes
- Country: Denmark
- Language: Danish

Temporary Release (Danish: Ledsaget udgang) is a 2007 Danish comedy film written by, directed and starring Erik Clausen. The film’s music was written by Kim Larsen. It was entered into the 29th Moscow International Film Festival.

== Plot ==
John (Erik Clausen) is granted an escorted leave from prison to attend his son's wedding. Accompanied by prison officer Bo (Jesper Asholt), John travels through much of Copenhagen to attend his son’s wedding.

== Cast ==
- Erik Clausen as John
- Jesper Asholt as Bo
- Ditte Gråbøl as Lisbeth
- Elith Nulle Nykjær as Sømmet (as Elith Nulle Nykjær Jørgensen)
- Anders Hove as Freddy
- Yüksel Akdag as Taxi Driver
- Jesper Rosenberg Antonsen as Fængselsbetjent
- Tim Brandt as Extra
- Henrik Bruhn as Kenneth
- Lilly Clausen as Johns mor
- Sami Darr as Samir
- Pil Egholm as Bettina

== Production ==
The film was shot entirely in Copenhagen’s Vesterbro district. During production, the film was based at the Kødbyen district on Halmtorvet in Vesterbro, where Clausen Film rented space. The district's offices also served as studio sets, including a fully constructed apartment-building floor and the film’s brothel. The prison shown in the film was also built in the part of the Old Meatpacking District facing Halmtorvet.

The film was produced by Peter Ingemann, known for his work with the group Skousen & Ingemann.

Erik Clausen’s mother, Lily Nielsen, plays John’s mother.
