= Carl, My Childhood Symphony =

1994 film

- DVD cover
- Directed by: Erik Clausen
- Written by: Erik Clausen
- Starring: Morten Gundel; Nikolaj Lie Kaas
- Music by: Andy Pape
- Distributed by: Nordisk Film
- Release date: 4 February 1994
- Running time: 125 minutes
- Country: Denmark
- Language: Danish

Carl, My Childhood Symphony (Danish: Min fynske barndom, lit. 'My Funen Childhood') is a 1994 Danish drama film directed by Erik Clausen. The film was selected as the Danish entry for the Best Foreign Language Film at the 67th Academy Awards, but was not accepted as a nominee.

The film is about the childhood of the Danish composer Carl Nielsen.

== Cast ==
- Morten Gundel as Carl I
- Anders Forchhammer as Carl II
- Nikolaj Lie Kaas as Carl III (as Nikolaj Kaas)
- Stina Ekblad as Maren Kirstine
- Jesper Milsted as Niels Maler
- Leif Sylvester as Blinde Anders
- Frits Helmuth as Outzen
- Jesper Christensen as Schreiber

== See also ==
- List of submissions to the 67th Academy Awards for Best Foreign Language Film
- List of Danish submissions for the Academy Award for Best Foreign Language Film
