= In the Middle of the Night (film) =

- Directed by: Erik Balling
- Written by: Kim Larsen; Henning Bahs; Erik Balling
- Starring: Kim Larsen; Erik Clausen; Birgitte Raaberg
- Music by: Kim Larsen
- Distributed by: Nordisk Film
- Release date: 9 March 1984
- Running time: 131 min
- Country: Denmark
- Language: Danish

In the Middle of the Night (Danish: Midt om natten) is a 1984 Danish musical drama film directed by Erik Balling, which was the final film project Balling ever directed before his death. It stars Kim Larsen, Erik Clausen and Birgitte Raaberg.

== Cast ==
- Kim Larsen as Benny
- Erik Clausen as Arnold Jensen
- Birgitte Raaberg as Susan Himmelblå
- Holger Boland as Tusindfryd
- Buster Larsen as Charles
- Frits Helmuth as J.O. Kurtzen
- Poul Bundgaard as Kai Buhmann
- Judy Gringer as Rita
- Ove Sprogøe as Mr. Himmelblå
- Allan Olsen as Spacey

Additionally, Anders Hove portrays Nalle, while Henning Sprogøe portrays Knold.

== Music ==
Midt om natten

Soundtrack album by Kim Larsen
- Genre: Rock

The film's soundtrack was composed and performed by Kim Larsen.

=== Certifications ===
Region	Certification	Certified units/sales
Denmark (IFPI Danmark)	5× Platinum	100,000^{^}
^{^} Shipments figures based on certification alone.
