= Bjarne Liller =

Danish musician and singer-songwriter (1935–1993)

- Also known as: Bjarne Liller
- Born: Bjarne Bent Rønne Pedersen; 25 September 1935, Vesterbro, Copenhagen, Denmark
- Died: 6 September 1993 (aged 57)
- Genres: Dixieland, jazz, pop music
- Occupation: Singer
- Instrument: Banjo
- Formerly of: Viking Jazz Band

Bjarne Bent Rønne Pedersen, known as Bjarne Liller (25 September 1935 – 6 September 1993), was a Danish jazz musician and singer-songwriter.

== Biography ==
Liller was born on Vesterbro, Copenhagen. He got his breakthrough as a banjo player and singer in Papa Bue's Viking Jazz Band.

He played with the Viking Jazz Band from 1956–70, and again from 1976-79, and made around 30 records with the band. He was also a successful solo artist, mainly in the pop music genre. He worked with John Mogensen, and got a gold record for selling 100,000 copies of his solo pop hit "Billet mrk./Ensom dame 40 år".

He finished second at the 1979 Dansk Melodi Grand Prix, singing the duet "Alt er skønt" with Grethe Ingmann. Liller received a silver record for 25,000 copies sold of each of his two albums "Man kan ikke gøre for, at man har charme" (1975) and "Livet er skønt" (1976).

He appeared in three Danish films; as a singer in "Thorvald og Linda" (1982), and in minor roles in Erik Clausen's films "Den store badedag" (1991) and "De frigjorte" (1993).

Liller credited Kim Larsen and Erik Clausen for re-igniting his passion for music during the last years of his life. He was active until his death in September 1993.

A sold-out benefit concert was held by his former jazz colleagues at the Tivoli Gardens later that month.
