= The Art of Crying =

2006 Danish tragicomedy film

- Danish poster
- Directed by: Peter Schønau Fog
- Written by: Bo Hr. Hansen
- Based on: The Art of Crying by Erling Jepsen
- Produced by: Thomas Stenderup
- Starring: Jesper Asholt; Jannik Lorenzen
- Cinematography: Harald Paalgard
- Edited by: Anne Østerud
- Music by: Karsten Fundal
- Distributed by: SF Film
- Release dates: 9 September 2006 (Toronto International Film Festival); 15 April 2007 (Denmark)
- Running time: 107 minutes
- Country: Denmark
- Language: Danish

The Art of Crying (Danish: Kunsten at Græde i Kor) is a 2006 Danish tragicomedy directed by Peter Schønau Fog. It stars Jannik Lorenzen and Jesper Asholt in a harsh tale about an 11-year-old boy's struggle to hold intact his bizarre family with its abusive father, mother in denial, and rebellious sister during the social unrest of the early 1970s. Based upon an autobiographical novel by Erling Jepsen, the screenplay was written by Bo Hr. Hansen.

The film received both the Bodil and Robert awards for Best Danish Film, and The Nordic Council Film Prize.

== Cast ==
- Jannik Lorenzen
- Jesper Asholt as Father
- Hanne Hedelund as Mother
- Julie Kolbech as Sanne (as Julie Kolbeck)
- Thomas Knuth-Winterfeldt as Asger
- Rita Angela as Grandmother
- Gitte Siem as Aunt Didde
- Lene Tiemroth as Psychiatrist
- Bjarne Henriksen as Budde
- Sune Thomsen as Per
- Hans Henrik Voetmann as Dr. Madsen
- Laura Kamis Wrang as Mrs. Budde

== See also ==
- List of Danish submissions for the Academy Award for Best Foreign Language Film
