= Me and Charly =

1978 film

- Film poster
- Directed by: Morten Arnfred; Henning Kristiansen
- Written by: Morten Arnfred; Henning Kristiansen; Bent E. Rasmussen
- Produced by: Steen Herdel
- Starring: Kim Jensen
- Cinematography: Morten Arnfred
- Release date: 19 March 1978
- Running time: 98 minutes
- Country: Denmark
- Language: Danish

Me and Charly (Danish: Mig og Charly) is a 1978 Danish drama film directed by Morten Arnfred and Henning Kristiansen. The film was selected as the Danish entry for the Best Foreign Language Film at the 51st Academy Awards, but was not accepted as a nominee.

== Cast ==
- Kim Jensen as Steffen
- Allan Olsen as Charly
- Helle Nielsen as Majbritt
- Ghita Nørby as Helle
- Finn Nielsen as Jørgen
- Jens Okking as Auto-Gunnar
- Lise Henningsen as Majbritt's mother
- Else Højgaard as Majbritts grandmother
- Erno Müller as Headmaster at a youth home

== See also ==
- List of submissions to the 51st Academy Awards for Best Foreign Language Film
- List of Danish submissions for the Academy Award for Best Foreign Language Film
