= Black Harvest (1993 film) =

1993 film

- Film poster
- Directed by: Anders Refn
- Written by: Anders Refn
- Starring: Ole Ernst
- Cinematography: Jan Weincke
- Distributed by: Nordisk Film
- Release date: 5 November 1993
- Running time: 120 minutes
- Country: Denmark
- Language: Danish

Black Harvest (Danish: Sort høst) is a 1993 Danish drama film directed by Anders Refn. The film was selected as the Danish entry for the Best Foreign Language Film at the 66th Academy Awards, but was not accepted as a nominee.

== Cast ==
- Ole Ernst as Nils Uldahl-Ege
- Sofie Gråbøl as Clara Uldahl-Ege
- Marika Lagercrantz as Line Uldahl-Ege
- Philip Zandén as Isidor Seemann
- Cecilie Brask as Frederikke Uldahl-Ege
- Mette Maria Ahrenkiel as Charlotte Uldahl-Ege
- Anna Eklund as Anna Uldahl-Ege

== See also ==
- List of submissions to the 66th Academy Awards for Best Foreign Language Film
- List of Danish submissions for the Academy Award for Best Foreign Language Film
