= Gert Fredholm =

Danish film director

- Born: 18 November 1941 (age 84); Næstved, Denmark
- Occupations: Film director Screenwriter
- Years active: 1967-present

Gert Fredholm (born 18 November 1941) is a Danish film director and screenwriter. He has directed nine films since 1967. His 1971 film Den forsvundne fuldmægtig was entered into the 22nd Berlin International Film Festival.

== Filmography ==
- Tag en rask beslutning (1967)
- Astrid Henning-Jensen (1967)
- Den forsvundne fuldmægtig (1971)
- Terror (1977)
- Lille Virgil og Orla Frøsnapper (1980)
- At klappe med een hånd (2001)
- Dommeren (2005)
- En enkelt til Korsør (2008)
- Orla Frøsnapper (2011)
