= Jesper Asholt =

Danish actor (born 1960)

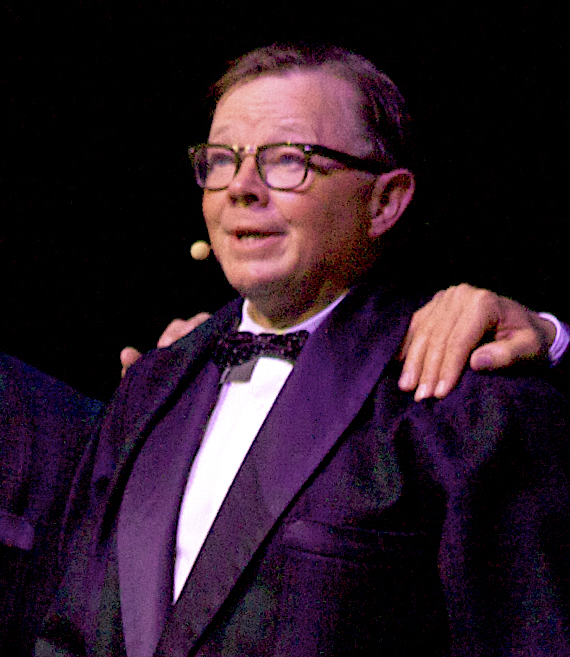
Jesper Asholt.

Jesper Asholt (born 11 May 1960 in Silkeborg) is a Danish actor. He has performed in more than fifty films since 1992.

== Selected filmography ==
Film
Year	Title	Role	Notes
2010	Nothing's All Bad		
2008	Grisen (the pig)		
2007	Temporary Release	Bo	
2006	The Art of Crying	Father	
2001	Monas verden	Chefen	
2000	Flickering Lights		
1999	Mifune's Last Song		

== Awards ==
- 2000: Bodil Award for Best Actor in a Supporting Role for his role of Rud in Mifune
- 2008: Bodil Award for Best Actor in a Leading Role for The Art of Crying
