= Erik Clausen =

Danish actor (1942–2024)

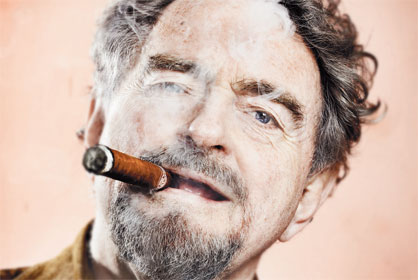
- Clausen in 2011
- Born: 7 March 1942; Copenhagen, Denmark
- Died: 30 October 2024 (aged 82)
- Occupations: Actor; director; screenwriter
- Years active: 1978–2019

Erik Clausen (7 March 1942 – 30 October 2024) was a Danish actor, film director and screenwriter. He directed fourteen films from 1981. His 2007 film Temporary Release was entered into the 29th Moscow International Film Festival. Clausen died on 30 October 2024, at the age of 82.

Clausen was the librettist for several operas created by composer Andy Pape; including Houdini den store (1988) about Harry Houdini; Bokseren (1995); and Dronningen af Blåtårn (1999) about Princess Leonora Christina Ulfeldt. Pape composed the score to Clausen's 1994 film Carl, My Childhood Symphony.

== Filmography ==
| Work | Year | Credit | Notes |
|---|---|---|---|
| People Get Eaten | 2015 | Direction | Feature |
| Freedom on Parole | 2010 | Direction | Feature |
| Temporary Release | 2007 | Direction | Feature |
| Helt vildt | 2006 | Voice | Feature |
| Mit Danmark – film nr. 5 | 2006 | Direction | Documentary |
| Villa Paranoia | 2004 | Direction | Feature |
| The Collector | 2004 | Harry | Feature |
| Better Times | 2004 | Man | TV series |
| Motormagasinet | 2004 | Bingovært | TV series |
| The Fighter | 2003 | Træneren | Short fiction |
| Break your Bounds | 2000 | Direction | Feature |
| Tango | 1997 | Direction | Short fiction |
| Fleas Bark Too, Don't They? | 1996 | Script | Feature |
| Cruise Manager | 1995 | Appearance | TV film |
| Carl, My Childhood Symphony | 1994 | Direction | Feature |
| Fish Out of Water | 1993 | Direction | Feature |
| The Great Day on the Beach | 1991 | Axel, Gustav Adolfs far | Feature |
| Dirch Passer | 1990 | Appearance | TV documentary |
| Kielgasten | 1990 | Screenplay | Feature |
| The knight of Justice | 1989 | Højtalerstemme | Short fiction |
| Me and Mama Mia | 1989 | Direction | Feature |
| A Good Clown | 1989 | Music | Documentary |
| Rami and Juliet | 1988 | Direction | Feature |
| The Dark Side of the Moon | 1986 | Direction | Feature |
| De flyvende djævle | 1985 | Dyrepasser | Feature |
| In the Middle of the Night | 1984 | Arnold | Feature |
| Rocking Silver | 1983 | Direction | Feature |
| Clausens garage | 1983 | Direction | TV series |
| Felix (1982 film) | 1982 | Direction | Feature |
| Det usynlige pattebarn | 1982 | Appearance | Short fiction |
| Tigerdukken | 1982 | Voice | TV film |
| Circus Casablanca | 1981 | Direction | Feature |
| Fantastisk tid | 1980 | Appearance | Documentary |
| Den musikalske pythonslange | 1979 | Direction | TV film |
| Me and Charly | 1978 | Gøgler | Feature |
| Ludvigsbakke | 1978 | Cirkusdirektør | TV series |
