= Peter Schønau Fog =

Danish film director

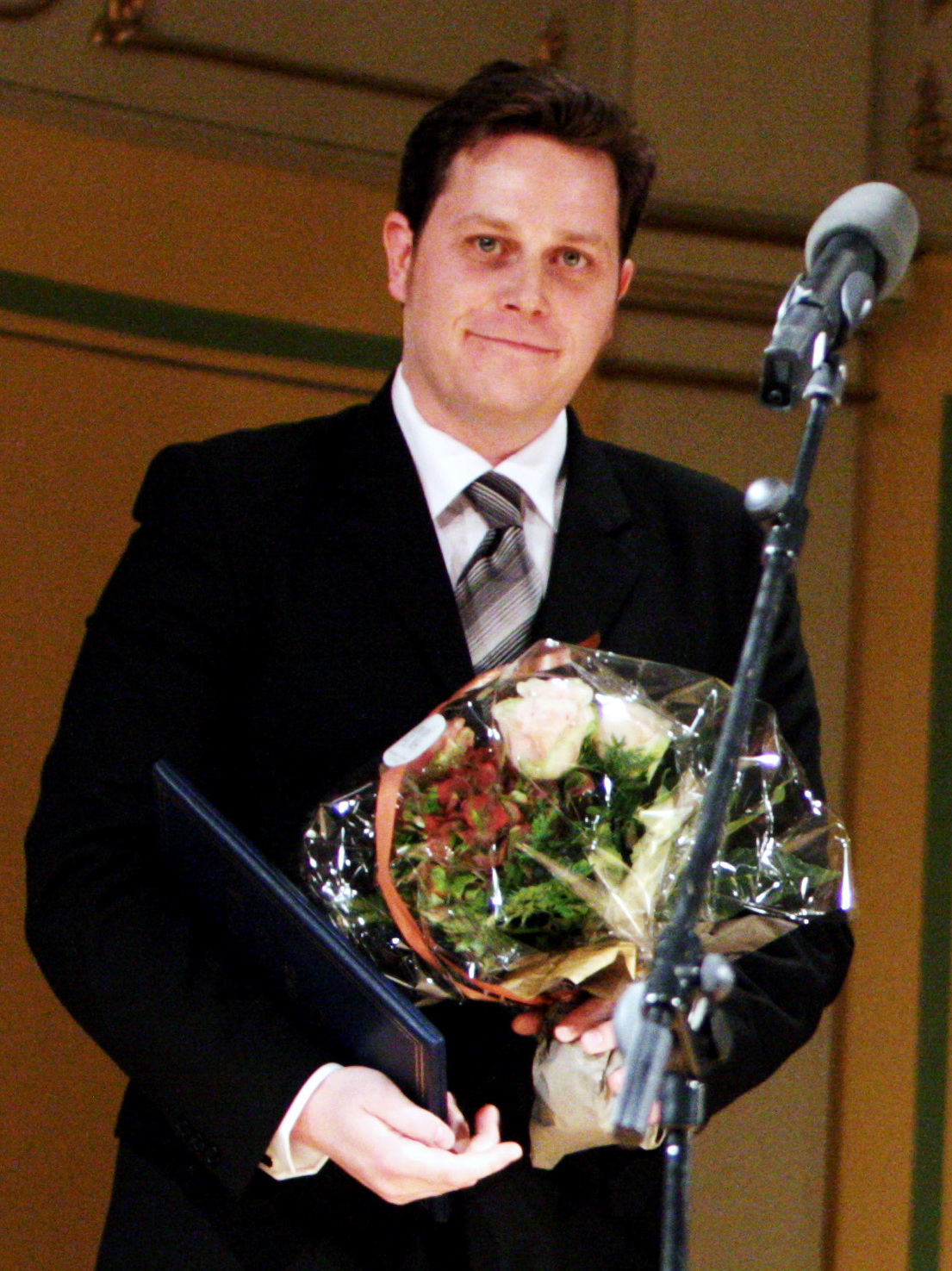
- Born: 20 April 1971; Denmark
- Occupation(s): Director, Writer
- Years active: 1999–present
- Awards: Bodil Award; Robert Award; Nordic Council Film Prize

Peter Schønau Fog (born 20 April 1971) is a Danish film director. Fog's debut feature film, Kunsten at græde i kor (English: The Art of Crying), based on Erling Jepsen's novel of the same name, premiered 27 April 2007 and received critical acclaim. For the film, he received the Nordic Council Film Prize for Best Film of 2007 as well as the 2007 Robert Award for Best Danish Film and 2008 Bodil Award for Best Danish Film.

Fog studied at the University of Copenhagen and the Prague Film School before graduating in 1999 from the National Film School of Denmark. His graduation project, the short film Lille Mænsk (English: Little Man) was shortlisted for Best Foreign Film at the Student Academy Awards.

In 2010, Fog accepted a four-year contract as consultant and project director at the Danish Film Institute which prevented him from pursuing personal film projects.

Fog wrote and directed the 2017 film Du forsvinder (English: You Disappear) based upon Christian Jungersen's bestselling novel of the same name. The film was submitted as Denmark's entry for the Best Foreign Language Film at the 90th Academy Awards, but it was not nominated.
