= Hans Kristensen =

Danish film director

- Born: 25 September 1941 (age 84)
- Occupations: Film director, screenwriter
- Years active: 1973–present

Hans Kristensen (born 25 September 1941) is a Danish film director, screenwriter, and actor. He has directed eleven feature films since 1973.

== Filmography ==
Work	Year	Credit	Notes
A Funny Man	2011	Behind the scenes shooting	DK/Feature
Bertram & Co.	2002	Direction	DK/Feature
Juliane	2000	Direction	DK/Feature
Christmas at Kronborg	2000	Direction	TV series
Two penny dance	1999	Direction	DK/Feature
Clinker Roller	1999	Direction	TV series
The Mortensen Brothers' Christmas	1998	Direction	TV series
Sunes familie	1997	Direction	DK/Feature
Mors dag	1996	Taxachauffør	TV film
Crumbs' Christmas	1996	Direction	TV series
Final hour	1995	Assistant director	DK/Feature
Just a girl	1995	Assistant director	DK/Feature
The Village	1991-1996	Direction	TV series
Love on the rails	1989	Direction	DK/Feature
Kurt and Valde	1983	Direction	DK/Feature
Pony in a Trunk	1983	Assistant director	Feature
Børn	1982	Direction	TV series
Ta' feen i den anden hånd	1981	Direction	DK/Short fiction
Afslutningen	1981	Direction	TV film
Det hemmelige Danmark	1981	Direction	TV film
Sorry, we are here.	1980	Direction	DK/Feature
Soldat i en PMV	1979	Direction	DK/Documentary
Opgang	1979	Direction	TV series
Blind Partner	1976	Direction	DK/Feature
John, Alice, Peter, Susanne og lille Verner	1976	Direction	TV series
Per	1975	Direction	DK/Feature
The Escape	1973	Direction	DK/Feature
Me and The Mafia	1973	Assistant director	DK/Feature
På'en igen Amalie	1973	Assistant director	DK/Feature
Up and Coming	1972	Assistant director	DK/Feature
Our Home is Our Castle	1971	Assistant director	DK/Feature
One of Those Things	1971	Production assistant	DK/Feature
The Olsen gang plays for high stakes	1971	Assistant director	DK/Feature
Løgneren	1970	Assistant	DK/Feature
Viva the revolution!	1970	Mand, der får sin folkevogn ødelagt	DK/Feature
Diary of a teenager	1969	Assistant	DK/Feature
Gitte in April	1969	Direction	DK/Documentary
