= Anders Refn =

Danish film editor and director (born 1944)

- Born: 8 April 1944 (age 82); Copenhagen, German occupied Denmark
- Occupations: Film editor and director
- Years active: 1966–present
- Spouse: Vibeke Winding
- Children: Nicolas Winding Refn

Anders Refn (born 8 April 1944) is a Danish film editor and director.

== Biography ==
Refn graduated from the National Film School of Denmark in 1969. He has credits for 72 features and TV series, as well as 10 shorts and 26 documentaries. Refn has often worked as assistant director and technical director, and worked with Lars von Trier as editor of Breaking the Waves (1996) and Antichrist (2009). He was assistant director of Dancer in the Dark (2000), Dogville (2003), Melancholia, and Nymphomaniac (2013).

Refn in 2004 was awarded an Honorary Bodil Award for his overall achievement in Danish film.

Refn is married to cinematographer Vibeke Winding; they are parents of Nicolas Winding Refn, who has also become a director, editor, and producer.

== Filmography ==
Work	Year	Credit	Notes
The Loose Tile	1966	Assistant	Feature
Flagermusen	1966	Assistant	Feature
Virtue Runs Wild	1966	Assistant	Feature
Pretty-Arne and Rosa	1967	Assistant director	Feature
Dreamers	1967	Assistant director	Feature
Dr. Glas	1968	Assistant editor	Feature
Miss Julie	1969	Editing	Short fiction
Jazz All Around	1969	Assistant director	Feature
Den gale dansker	1969	Editing	Feature
Tintomara	1970	Editing	Feature
Vilde engle – en minoritet i Danmark	1971	Editing	Documentary
The Squatters	1971	Editing	Documentary
Lost in the Sand	1971	Editing	Feature
With Love	1971	Editing	Feature
Dear Irene	1971	Editing	Feature
The Case of the Missing Clerk	1971	Assistant director	Feature
The Work of the Devil	1972	Editing	Feature
Mor, jeg har patienter	1972	Editing	Feature
Karen	1973	Editing	Short fiction
Er kongen død?	1973	Editing	Documentary
The Escape	1973	Assistant director	Feature
Sacked!	1973	Assistant director	Feature
Prince Piwi	1974	Script	Feature
Sam på banegården	1975	Editing	Short fiction
Arbejdsløs	1975	Editing	Documentary
The Impossible Hour	1975	Editing	Documentary
Hvid mands sæd	1975	Editing	Documentary
Klaus Rifbjerg	1975	Editing	Documentary
Strømer	1976	Direction	Feature
Hearts Are Trump	1976	Assistant director	Feature
Terror	1977	Editing	Feature
A Fisherman from Hanstholm	1977	Editing	Documentary
The Heritage	1978	Direction	Feature
Me and Charly	1978	Editing	Feature
Dancing Bournonville	1979	Editing	Documentary
Johnny Larsen	1979	Editing	Feature
Next Stop – Paradise	1980	Editing supervisor	Feature
Hotel of the Stars	1981	Editing	Documentary
Rubber Tarzan	1981	Editing	Feature
The Circus Casablanca	1981	Editing	Feature
Felix	1982	Editing supervisor	Feature
Electric Boogie	1983	Editing	Documentary
Land of Plenty	1983	Editing	Feature
Phoenix bird	1984	Editing	Documentary
Ophelia Comes to Town	1985	Editing	Feature
De flyvende djævle	1985	Direction	Feature, Robert Award for Best Danish Film
Kedsomhedens svøbe	1986	Editing	Documentary
Take It Easy	1986	Editing	Feature
Een gang strømer...	1987	Direction	TV series
Heaven and Hell	1988	Director: 2. unit	Feature
På optagelse med Steven Spielberg	1990	Direction	Documentary
The Village	1991	Direction	TV series
Hayfever	1991	Assistant director	Feature
Il ritorno	1992	Assistant director	Feature
Black Harvest	1993	Direction	Feature
Dad's Bright Idea	1994	Technical director	Feature
Carl, My Childhood Symphony	1994	Editing	Feature
Two Green Feathers	1995	Editing	Feature
Breaking the Waves	1996	Editor	Feature
TAXA	1997	Direction	TV series
Seth	1999	Direction	Short fiction
The Magnetist's Fifth Winter	1999	Editing supervisor	Feature
Dancer in the Dark	2000	Assisting director	Feature
Sophie's Heart	2001	Editing	Short fiction
Stargazer	2002	Consultant	Documentary
P.O.V. - Point of View	2002	Editing	Feature
Baby	2003	Editing	Feature
Move Me	2003	Editing supervisor	Feature
Dogville	2003	Assisting director	Feature
Niceland	2004	Editing	Feature
Popular Music	2004	Editing	Feature
What's Wrong with This Picture?	2004	Editing	Feature
Hvorfor har mænd magten?	2004	Editing	Documentary
The Danish Solution	2005	Editing	Documentary
The Leap	2005	Editing	Feature
Samurai	2006	Editing supervisor	Short fiction
Out	2006	Editing	Short fiction
Mrs Eilersen and Mehmet	2006	Editing	Short fiction
Mother Dearest	2007	Editing	Short fiction
Echo	2007	Editing supervisor	Feature
Milosevic on Trial	2007	Editing	Documentary
Ledsaget udgang	2007	Editing	Feature
My Black Little Heart	2008	Editor	Feature
Am I Black Enough for You	2008	Editing	Documentary
Max Manus: Man of War	2008	Editing	Feature
Necrobusiness	2008	Editing	Documentary
Go With Peace, Jamil	2008	Editing	Feature
Antichrist	2009	Editor	Feature
Limbo	2010	Editing	Documentary
My Father from Haifa	2010	Editing	Documentary
Freedom on Parole	2010	Editing	Feature
Nothing's All Bad	2010	Editing supervisor	Feature
Pockets of Resistance	2011	Consultant	Documentary
Thors saga	2011	Editing	Documentary
ID:A	2011	Editor	Feature
Beast	2011	Editing supervisor	Feature
Karen Blixen – Behind Her Mask	2011	Editing supervisor	Documentary
The President	2011	Editing supervisor	Documentary
All for One	2011	Editing supervisor	Feature
Melancholia	2011	Assisting director	Feature
Kon-Tiki	2012	Editing supervisor	Feature
Ginger & Rosa	2012	Chief editor	Feature
Eddie: The Sleepwalking Cannibal	2012	Editing supervisor	Feature
This life	2012	Technical director	Feature
Tabu	2012	Editing	Short fiction
Memories of My Melancholy Whores	2012	Editing	Feature
Nymphomaniac	2013	Assisting director	Feature
What We Become	2015	Editor	Feature
Into the Darkness	2020	Director	Feature
The Middle Man	2021	Editor	Feature
Min fjendes fjende: Bedraget i Helmand	2023	Editor	Documentary
Diagnonsense	2024	Editor	Documentary
Sanningen	2023-2024	Co-editor	TV Series
