= Christian Jungersen =

Danish novelist (born 1962)

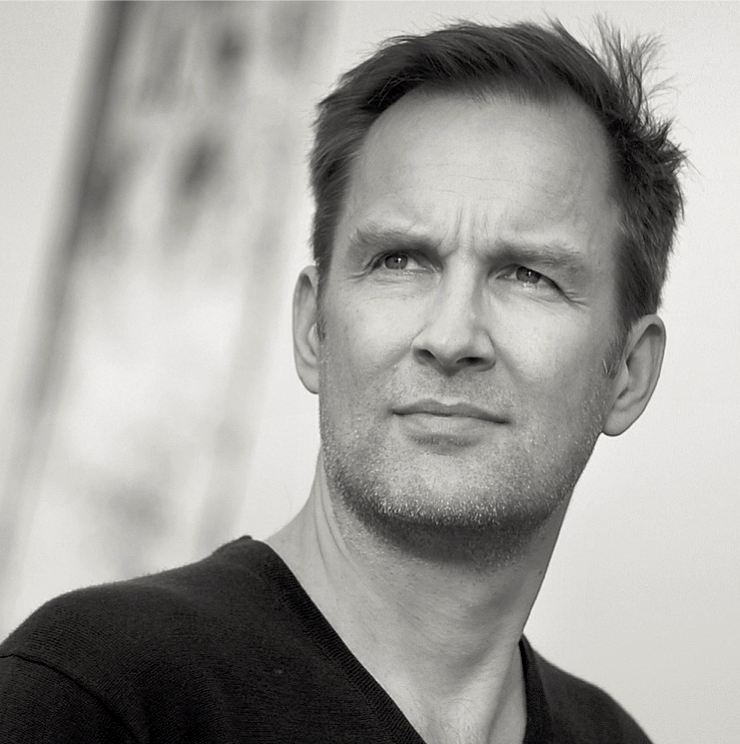
- Christian Jungersen
- Born: 10 July 1962 (age 64); Copenhagen, Denmark
- Occupations: Writer, novelist

Christian Jungersen (born 10 July 1962) is a Danish novelist. He made his literary debut with the novel Krat in 1999. He has published four novels: Krat (1999), Undtagelsen (2004), Du forsvinder (2012), and Du kan alt (2021). His novels are primarily psychological thrillers and often examine questions of identity, responsibility, human behavior, and the relationship between individual choice and external influences

== Early life and education ==
Jungersen was born in Copenhagen, Denmark, and grew up in Humlebæk. He graduated as a cand.comm. from Roskilde University (RUC), where he studied communication and social science.

Before beginning his career as a novelist, Jungersen taught film studies at Folkeuniversitetet in Copenhagen. He also worked as an advertising copywriter and manuscript consultant. His early professional work included writing and developing scripts, before he concentrated on literary fiction.

== Writing and themes ==
Jungersen's novels have been described by Danish literary sources as psychological narratives that combine suspense with investigations of human identity and the conflict between good and evil. His books frequently use thriller conventions while addressing philosophical or psychological questions. Undtagelsen examines workplace bullying and the psychology of evil, Du forsvinder addresses responsibility and free will in the context of neurological illness, and Du kan alt considers the possibility of changing one's life in middle age.

Litteratursiden has noted that Jungersen's novels repeatedly explore how people understand themselves and how their behavior can be affected by circumstances beyond their immediate control.

=== Krat ===
Jungersen's debut novel, Krat, was published in 1999. The novel follows two men whose friendship begins in the Danish upper class of the 1920s and continues over almost seven decades. The story moves between different periods of their lives and gradually reveals the events that transformed their friendship into hostility.

The novel won Bogforums Debutantpris in 1999 and was nominated for the Weekendavisen Literary Prize. It remained on the Danish bestseller list for three months.

=== Undtagelsen (The Exception) ===
Undtagelsen was published in Denmark in 2004. The psychological thriller follows four women working at a fictional Danish centre for genocide research. After two receive death threats, they consider whether the threats stem from their work or conflicts within the workplace. The novel explores workplace bullying, social exclusion, interpersonal conflict and the psychology of evil. It remained on the Danish bestseller list for approximately 18 months and won De Gyldne Laurbær and DR Romanprisen in 2005. It was subsequently published in 18 countries.

The novel was shortlisted for several international literary awards, including the CWA International Dagger, the Grand Prix des Lectrices de Elle and the Martin Beck Award, and was nominated for the International Dublin Literary Award. An English translation by Anna Paterson was published in the United States in 2007, with a British edition also released. The novel received reviews in The New York Times, The New Yorker and The Economist, and was adapted for BBC Radio 4.

In reader polls conducted by Jyllands-Posten, the novel ranked second among Danish novels published over the preceding 25 years in 2009 and was selected as the best Danish novel of the preceding decade in 2010.

=== Du forsvinder (You Disappear) ===
You Disappear ("Du Forsvinder"), is narrated by Mia, whose husband Frederik undergoes radical personality changes due to a slowly growing brain tumour that leaves his intellect, speech, and motor control intact. Their lives change even more when it comes out that, in the year before his diagnosis, he embezzled 12 million kroner from the private Copenhagen school where he is headmaster.

You Disappear has been both a critical and a commercial success in Denmark since being published there in March 2012. Library and newspaper readers awarded it the Læsernes Bogpris, and it was nominated for two other major honours, Politiken's Literature Prize and the Martha Prize. It received five-star reviews in Politiken, Ekstrabladet, MetroXpress, Femina, Magasinet IN, Nordjydske Tidende, and Dagbladenes Bureau. It remained on Denmark's top-10 list of bestselling fiction for an entire year and was the second-bestselling novel in 2012, outsold only by Marco Effekten [The Marco Effect], the Jussi Adler-Olsen thriller.

You Disappear was sold to another ten countries, including Germany and France. The US edition came out in January 2014 from Nan A. Talese/Doubleday. The American translation by Misha Hoekstra won the Leif & Inger Sjöberg Prize from the American-Scandinavian Foundation.

=== Du kan alt (Life Hunger) ===
Jungersen's fourth novel, Du kan alt, was published by Gyldendal in September 2021.

The novel follows Per Berg, a middle-aged man whose son leaves home and whose wife announces that she wants a divorce after 22 years of marriage. Per leaves his job and decides to build a new career in therapy and coaching. His new life brings him into contact with criminals, torture survivors and other people seeking to change their circumstances.

The novel moves between contemporary Denmark and other settings, including Rio de Janeiro and Iran, and combines elements of contemporary realism, comedy, psychological fiction and thriller writing.

Litteratursiden's review identified freedom of choice and the possibility of starting one's life again as central questions of the novel. It also discussed the contrast between characters who have opportunities to reinvent themselves and people whose circumstances severely restrict their freedom.

The novel received reviews in a number of Danish newspapers and literary publications, including Berlingske, Weekendavisen, Information, Politiken, Jyllands-Posten, Børsen and Kristeligt Dagblad.

The novel is referred to as Life Hunger in English-language material concerning Jungersen's work.

== Film adaptations ==
The film Du Forsvinder, based on You Disappear, was directed by Peter Schønau Fog from the screenplay by Peter Schønau Fog and starred Trine Dyrholm and Nikolaj Lie Kaas. The movie premiered in 2017 and was one of the best-selling films in Denmark that year. Du Forsvinder was Denmark's submission for the 2017 Oscar for Best Foreign Language Film.

The movie Undtagelsen (The Exception in English; 2019) was based on Jungersen's second novel, The Exception. It was directed by Jesper W. Nielsen from the screenplay by Christian Torpe. Sidse Babett Knudsen, Amanda Collin, Danica Curcic, and Lene Maria Christensen played the leading roles. It was released when Danish cinemas reopened in July 2020, after having been closed for four months due to the COVID-19 pandemic, and it remained on the country's top-10 list of best-selling films for nine weeks. It won the Valhalla Award for Best Nordic Film at the Santa Barbara International Film Festival in 2020.

=== Short fiction ===
Jungersen’s short story "Rumble in the Jungle" appeared in issue 39 of the American literary magazine n+1, published in Winter 2021.

The story is an edited exerpt from Du kan alt and was published in English before the Danish novel appeared in September 2021.

== Reception and recognition ==
Jungersen's work has received recognition in Denmark through literary prizes and reader polls. Krat won Bogforums Debutantpris in 1999, Undtagelsen won De Gyldne Laurbær and DR Romanprisen, and Du forsvinder won Læsernes Bogpris.

The international reception of The Exception included nominations for literary awards in Ireland, the United Kingdom, France and Sweden, while the English-language edition of You Disappear received reviews from a number of major literary publications.

== Bibliography ==
=== Novels ===
- Krat (1999)
- Undtagelsen (2004), published in English as The Exception (2007)
- Du forsvinder (2012), published in English as You Disappear (2014)
- Du kan alt (2021), referred to as Life Hunger in English-language material

=== Short fiction ===
- "Rumble in the Jungle", n+1, Winter 2021

== Awards and prizes ==
- 1999: Bogforums Debutantpris, for Krat.
- 2000:Three-year working grant from the Danish Arts Foundation.
- 2005: De Gyldne Laurbær, for Undtagelsen.
- 2005:DR Romanprisen (P2 Romanprisen), for Undtagelsen.
- 2013: Læsernes Bogpris, for Du forsvinder.
