= Morten Arnfred =

Danish film director and screenwriter (1945–2025)

- Born: 2 August 1945; Copenhagen, Denmark
- Died: 2 September 2025 (aged 80)
- Occupations: Director; screenwriter
- Years active: 1976–2013

Morten Arnfred (2 August 1945 – 2 September 2025) was a Danish film director and screenwriter. His 1983 film Der er et yndigt land was entered into the 33rd Berlin International Film Festival, where it won an Honourable Mention. Ten years later, his film The Russian Singer was entered into the 43rd Berlin International Film Festival. He also co-directed the miniseries trilogy Riget with Lars von Trier. Arnfred died on 2 September 2025, at the age of 80.

== Selected filmography ==
- Me and Charly (1978)
- Johnny Larsen (1979)
- Der er et yndigt land (1983)
- Riget (1994–1997)
- Beck – Spår i mörker (1997)
- The Russian Singer (1993)
- Move Me (2003)
