= Henning Kristiansen =

Danish cinematographer

- Born: 2 July 1927; Denmark
- Died: 2 November 2006 (aged 79); Copenhagen, Denmark
- Occupations: Cinematographer, film director
- Years active: 1947–1998

Henning Kristiansen (2 July 1927 – 2 November 2006) was a Danish cinematographer and film director. He was nominated for a BAFTA award for Best Cinematography for Babette's Feast.

== Selected filmography ==
- Styrmand Karlsen (1958)
- Hunger (1966)
- The Dance of Death (1967)
- People Meet and Sweet Music Fills the Heart (1967)
- Jazz All Around (1969)
- The Night Visitor (1971)
- Ghost Train International (1976)
- Me and Charly (1978)
- Babette's Feast (1987)
