= Erik Crone (film producer) =

Danish film producer (1946–2022)

- Born: 22 November 1946; Copenhagen, Denmark
- Died: 14 October 2022 (aged 75)
- Occupation: Producer

Erik Crone (22 November 1946 – 14 October 2022) was a Danish film producer and father of Natasja Crone Back.
