= List of Danish films of the 2000s =

The following table is a list of films produced in Denmark or in the Danish language during the 2000s. For an alphabetical list of all Danish films currently on Wikipedia see Category:Danish films. For Danish films from other decades see the Cinema of Denmark box above.

Danish title	English title	Director(s)	Cast	Genre	Notes
2000
Blinkende Lygter	Flickering Lights	Anders Thomas Jensen	Søren Pilmark, Mads Mikkelsen	Comedy	
Dancer in the Dark	Dancer in the Dark	Lars von Trier	Björk, Catherine Deneuve	Musical	Won the Palme d'Or at Cannes
Dykkerne	Beyond	Åke Sandgren	Robert Hansen	Adventure	
Hjælp, Jeg er en Fisk	Help! I'm a Fish	Stefan Fjeldmark	Nils Bank-Mikkelsen	Animation	
HotMen CoolBoyz	HotMen CoolBoyz	Knud Vesterskov	Ron Athey, Billy Herrington	Erotica	Integrated erotica with a mainstream film, 1 of 3 produced by Zentropa
Italiensk for Begyndere	Italian for Beginners	Lone Scherfig	Anette Støvelbæk, Anders W. Berthelsen	Romantic Comedy	Dogme 95
The King Is Alive	The King Is Alive	Kristian Levring			Screened at the 2000 Cannes Film Festival
Max	Max	Trine Piil Christensen	Sidse Babett Knudsen	Drama	
Prop og Berta	Prop and Berta	Per Fly	Otto Brandenburg, Paprika Steen (voices)	Children's Animation	Stop-motion
2001
En Kort En Lang	Shake It All About	Hella Joof	Mads Mikkelsen, Troels Lyby, Charlotte Munck, Jesper Lohmann	Romantic Comedy	Entered into the 24th Moscow International Film Festival
En Kærlighedshistorie	Kira's Reason: A Love Story	Ole Christian Madsen	Stine Stengade, Lars Mikkelsen	Drama	Dogme 95; Bodil Award for Best Danish Film, Robert Award for Film of the Year
Monas Verden	Mona's World	Jonas Elmer	Sidse Babett Knudsen, Thomas Bo Larsen, Mads Mikkelsen	Comedy	
2002
Klatretøsen	Catch That Girl	Hans Fabian Wullenweber	Lars Bom	Children's Adventure	
At kende sandheden	Facing the Truth	Nils Malmros	Jens Albinus	Drama	
Jeg er Dina	I Am Dina	Ole Bornedal	Gérard Depardieu, Maria Bonnevie	Drama	
Gamle Mænd i Nye Biler	Old Men in New Cars	Lasse Spang Olsen	Kim Bodnia, Nikolaj Lie Kaas	Action comedy	
Elsker dig for evigt	Open Hearts	Susanne Bier	Mads Mikkelsen, Nikolaj Lie Kaas	Drama	Dogme 95; Bodil Award for Best Danish Film, Robert Award for Film of the Year
Wilbur Begår Selvmord	Wilbur Wants to Kill Himself	Lone Scherfig	Mads Mikkelsen	Black comedy	English-language film
2003
Arven	The Inheritance	Per Fly	Ulrich Thomsen	Drama	Robert Award for Film of the Year
De Grønne Slagtere	The Green Butchers	Anders Thomas Jensen	Mads Mikkelsen, Nikolaj Lie Kaas	Comedy drama	
De fem benspænd	The Five Obstructions	Jørgen Leth; Lars Von Trier	Jørgen Leth Lars Von Trier	Documentary	Experimental documentary based on Leth's The Perfect Human (1967)
Dogville	Dogville	Lars von Trier	Nicole Kidman, Lauren Bacall	Drama	Bodil Award for Best Danish Film, entered into Cannes
Reconstruction	Reconstruction	Christoffer Boe	Nikolaj Lie Kaas, Maria Bonnevie	Drama	Golden Camera and Prix Regards Jeune at Cannes Film Festival
Regel nr. 1	Rule No. 1	Oliver Ussing	Susanne Juhász	Comedy	
Skagerrak		Søren Kragh-Jacobsen			Entered into the 25th Moscow International Film Festival
Switching		Morten Schódt		Drama	First Danish interactive film
2004
Brødre	Brothers	Susanne Bier	Connie Nielsen, Ulrich Thomsen	Drama	
Dear Wendy	Dear Wendy	Thomas Vinterberg			Entered into the 27th Moscow International Film Festival
Kongekabale	King's Game	Nikolaj Arcel	Anders W. Berthelsen, Søren Pilmark, Nastja Arcel, Nicolas Bro	Thriller	Bodil Award for Best Danish Film; Robert Award for Film of the Year
2005
Adams Æbler	Adam's Apples	Anders Thomas Jensen	Mads Mikkelsen, Ulrich Thomsen	Comedy drama	Robert Award for Film of the Year
Af banen	We are the Champions	Martin Hagbjer	Lars Bom	Comedy	
All About Anna	All About Anna	Jessica Nilsson	Gry Bay, Eileen Daly, Ovidie	Erotica Comedy	Sexually explicit mainstream film produced by Zentropa; four AVN Award nominations
Allegro	Allegro	Christoffer Boe	Ulrich Thomsen, Nikolaj Lie Kaas	Drama	Best Cinematography at Robert Festival
Manderlay	Manderlay	Lars von Trier			Entered into the 2005 Cannes Film Festival
Nynne	Nynne	Jonas Elmer	Mille Dinesen, Lars Kaalund, Mette Agnete Horn, Stine Stengade, Jimmi Jørgensen	Comedy	
Nordkraft	Angels in Fast Motion	Ole Christian Madsen	Signe Egholm Olsen, Claus Riis Østergaard, Thure Lindhardt	Crime	
Terkel i Knibe	Terkel in Trouble	Kresten Vestbjerg Andersen, Thorbjørn Christoffersen, Stefan Fjeldmark	Anders Matthesen, Kim Mattheson	Animation	Bodil Award for Best Danish Film
2006
Efter Brylluppet	After the Wedding	Susanne Bier	Sidse Babett Knudsen, Mads Mikkelsen	Drama	
Direktøren for det Hele	The Boss of It All	Lars von Trier	Jens Albinus	Comedy	
Drømmen	We Shall Overcome	Niels Arden Oplev	Bent Mejding	Drama	
En Soap	A Soap	Pernille Fischer Christensen	Trine Dyrholm, David Dencik	Black comedy	Bodil Award for Best Danish Film; Silver Berlin Bear
Offscreen	Offscreen	Christoffer Boe	Nicolas Bro, Lene Maria Christensen	Drama	Young Cinema Award at Venice Film Festival
Prag	Prague	Ole Christian Madsen	Mads Mikkelsen, Stine Stengade	Drama	
Princess	Princess	Anders Morgenthaler	Thure Lindhardt, Stine Fischer Christensen	Animation	
2007
De fortabte sjæles ø	Island of Lost Souls	Nikolaj Arcel	Nicolaj Kopernikus, Lars Mikkelsen	Adventure, Fantasy	
Karlas kabale	Karlas World	Charlotte Sachs Bostrup	Nicolaj Kopernikus, Ellen Hillingsø	Drama	
Kunsten at Græde i Kor	The Art of Crying	Peter Schønau Fog	Jesper Asholt	Drama	Bodil Award for Best Danish Film, Robert Award for Film of the Year
Kærlighed på film	Just Another Love Story	Ole Bornedal	Anders W. Berthelsen	Thriller Suspense	
Ledsaget Udgang	Temporary Release	Erik Clausen	Jesper Asholt	Comedy drama	Entered into the 29th Moscow International Film Festival
2008
Blå mænd	Take the Trash	Rasmus Heide	Thure Lindhardt, Sidse Babett Knudsen, Mick Øgendahl, Troels Lyby, Claire Ross-Brown, Beate Bille	Comedy	
Kandidaten	The Candidate	Kasper Barfoed	Nikolaj Lie Kaas, Ulf Pilgaard, Laura Christensen, Tuva Novotny, David Dencik	Thriller	
Dansen	Everybody's Dancing	Pernille Fischer Christensen	Anders W. Berthelsen, Sofia Cukic, Trine Dyrholm	Drama	
Flammen & Citronen	Flame & Citron	Ole Christian Madsen	Thure Lindhardt, Mads Mikkelsen	Thriller	
Den du frygter	Fear Me Not	Kristian Levring	Ulrich Thomsen, Paprika Steen	Psychological thriller, drama	
2009
Antichrist	Antichrist	Lars Von Trier	Willem Dafoe, Charlotte Gainsbourg	Horror	Bodil Award for Best Danish Film; Robert Award for Film of the Year
Kærestesorger	Aching Hearts	Nils Malmros	Anni Bjørn, Ida Dwinger, Thomas Ernst	Drama	
Ved verdens ende	At World's End	Tomas Villum Jensen	Nikolaj Lie Kaas, Birgitte Hjort Sørensen, Nikolaj Coster-Waldau	Action comedy	
2010
Hævnen	In a Better World	Susanne Bier	Mikael Persbrandt, Trine Dyrholm, Ulrich Thomsen	Drama	Academy Award for Best Foreign Film
Karla og Jonas	Karla and Jonas	Charlotte Sachs Bostrup	Nicolaj Kopernikus, Ellen Hillingsø	Comedy drama	
Kvinden der drømte om en mand	The Woman That Dreamed About a Man	Per Fly	Sonja Richter, Marcin Dorociński, Mikael Nyqvist	Drama	
