= Zeitgeist (company) =

Zeitgeist ApS
- Industry: Film
- Founded: 1997
- Founder: Søren Juul Petersen
- Headquarters: Denmark

Zeitgeist ApS is a Danish independent film production company created in 1997 by producer Søren Juul Petersen and has produced a number of theatrical feature films.

Zeitgeist remained one of Denmark's very few independent film companies for a number of years. The company since declared bankruptcy after the unsuccessful production of the Danish horror film Skavengers (2012).

== Filmography ==
- Taste of Cherry (1993)
- Skyggen / Webmaster (1998)
- Regel nr. 1 (2003)
- Erik, of het klein insectenboek (2004)
- Af banen / We Are the Champions (2005)
- Remix (2008)
