= Bjarne Henriksen =

Danish actor (born 1959)

- Born: 18 January 1959 (age 66); Såderup, Funen, Denmark
- Occupation: Actor
- Known for: Hotellet, The Killing

Bjarne Henriksen (born 18 January 1959) is a Danish film and television actor.

== Career ==
Henriksen was born in Såderup, Funen, in 1959. He has appeared in theatre productions at the Jomfru Ane Teatret, Aalborg, and at the Svalegangen Theater, Aarhus, and has played supporting roles in numerous Danish films from the late 1990s through to the present, including De største helte, Festen, Kinamand, and Af banen. He has appeared in two films by Jonas Elmer: Let's Get Lost and Monas verden.

More recently, he has been known for playing the lead role of Theis Birk Larsen, father of the murdered Nanna Birk Larsen in season one of the DR television drama series The Killing, first broadcast in 2007.

In 2011, Henriksen, along with Sofie Gråbøl, Søren Malling, Ann Eleonora Jørgensen, and Lars Mikkelsen were nominated in the Crime Thriller Awards for their work in The Killing.

In 2015, Henriksen played the role of the Danish ferry captain Søren Carlsen in the Icelandic crime drama series Trapped.

== Selected filmography ==
=== Film ===
List of film appearances, with year, title, and role shown
Year	Title	Role
1996	De største helte	Allan
1997	Let's Get Lost	Mogens
1998	Festen	Kim
2001	Monas verden	Tommy
2002	Kinamand	Keld
2005	Af banen	Lennart
2007	The Art of Crying	Budde
2008	Fear Me Not	Kenneth
2010	Hold Me Tight	Mikkel's dad
2012	The Hunt	Ole
2012	This Life	Albert Carlo Iversen
2014	Get Santa	Lars
2018	Kursk	Russian captain

=== Television ===
List of television appearances, with year, title, and role shown
Year	Title	Role	Notes
1997–98	Taxa	Sebastian	4 episodes
1999	Dybt vand	Bendix	Miniseries
2000–02	Hotellet	Lasse Vestergaard	31 episodes
2003–04	Rejseholdet	Jack	2 episodes
2007	The Killing	Theis Birk Larsen	20 episodes
2010–13	Borgen	Hans Christian Thorsen	15 episodes
2013	Moving On	Kris	1 episode
2013–18	Badehotellet	Otto Frigh	31 episodes
2015	Trapped	Søren Carlsen, ferry captain	10 episodes
2021	The Chestnut Man	John Brink	1 episode
2024	King & Conqueror	Earl Siward	
