= The Birdcatcher =

The Birdcatcher may refer to:

- The Birdcatcher (novel), a 2022 novel by Gayl Jones
- The Birdcatcher (film), a 2019 film by Ross Clarke
