= Puk Scharbau =

Danish actress (born 1969)

Puk Scharbau (born 6 May 1969 in Søborg, Gladsaxe Municipality) is a Danish actress.

== Education ==
Scharbau graduated from the Acting course at Odense Theatre in May 1993. Later, she earned a degree in media and rhetoric. In the summers of 1991–1993, she studied the Suzuki method for acting from Japanese director Tadashi Suzuki and was certified to teach the method.

== Career ==
She debuted in The Medium in Japan in 1993, and as Vulva in After Orgy at Odense Theatre. Since then she has performed at such House Theatre, Café Theatre, Edison, Betty Nansen Theatre and Nørrebro Theatre.

Her film career began in 1995 with the lead role in the film version of Lise Nørgaard's memories, Only A Girl, which also became her popular breakthrough. The role earned her both a Bodil Award for Best Actress and a Robert Award for female lead.

In 1998 Scharbau appeared in the cyberpunk thriller Skyggen AKA Webmaster with Lars Bom. She played the role of Miauv. Later, she said about the role; "there is a smell of messy apartment and uncleaned litter box above Miauv".

In 2002, Scharbau started the consulting firm Actors Inc., working as a communications consultant.

She played the part of Mette, the wife of Martin Rohde, in the TV series The Bridge.
