= What We Become =

What We Become may refer to:

- What We Become (film), a 2015 Danish horror film
- What We Become (The Walking Dead), an episode of the television series The Walking Dead
