= Develco Products =

Danish wireless technology producer

- Company type: Private
- Industry: Technology; Internet of Things
- Founded: 2007
- Headquarters: Aarhus, Denmark
- Area served: Global
- Key people: Karsten Ries (CEO)
- Products: IoT gateway; Wireless devices

Develco Products is a B2B wireless technology producer, headquartered in Aarhus, Denmark. The company was established in 2007 and develops white label devices for B2C solution providers and has over 3,500,000 devices deployed worldwide... Their main business areas are home care, security, and smart energy. They are a member of the Connectivity Standards Alliance (formerly known as the Zigbee Alliance) as their main technological expertise lies in Zigbee-based devices that communicate through a mesh network. The company claims their most popular product is the Squid.link gateway.

A number of analyst firms include Develco in their analysis of the IoT and automation industries.

== History ==
Develco Products was initially founded as a spin-off from Develco with a focus on Smart Grid products. In 2014 they launched a white label version of their IoT Platform and Zigbee devices, including the first generation of the Squid.link gateway. After launching their Software Development Platform Develco Products became one of the Zigbee top 10 products certifiers. In 2017, Develco Products launched a Software Developer Platform, and reported that in their first ten years they had produced 30 new products and had more than 1,000,000 products deployed worldwide. Their production was also moved to Thailand. The Squid.link 2nd generation gateway was launched in 2019 and the company reported that in 2022, more than 3,500,000 devices had been sold.

== Business-to-Business ==
Develco Products sell a variety of wireless security devices to traditional security companies, which are in turn incorporated in their own smart home security solutions. Wireless passive infrared sensors (PIR) may be used for burglary protection with other devices used for light automation and temperature measurement. Other products are deployed as part of traditional alarm systems including interconnected smoke alarms, remotely controlled keypads, door and window sensors.

Develco Products' portfolio is also available for home care solution providers, especially in terms of assisted living, remote health monitoring, and independent living for the elderly or people with various diseases. Deploying a network of intelligent sensors allows for tracking and monitoring patients' health, comfort, and living conditions. In the case of emergency, relatives and caretakers can be alerted so that help is immediately sent.

== Gateway ==
The gateways support multiple communication protocols such as Zigbee 3.0, Wireless M-Bus, Bluetooth Low Energy, Bluetooth Classic, WLAN, HAN and cellular networks. They have a programmable Linux platform which allows integration with a wide variety of cloud solutions and APIs ensuring high performance

The company produces a range of sensors and alarms ranging from motion sensors and environment sensors to sirens and panic buttons, smart plugs, meter interfaces and smart relays.

== Awards ==
Year	Award	Category	Nominee(s)	Result	Ref.
2020	EY Entrepreneur of the Year 2020	-	Develco Products	Nominated	
2020	Børsen Gazelle 2020	-	Develco Products	Won	

== Research projects ==
Develco Products participates in large-scale research projects such as the European Union Arrowhead automation and digitization project, and FINESCE - part of the Future Internet PPP (FI-PPP).
