= Ann Hjort =

Danish actress

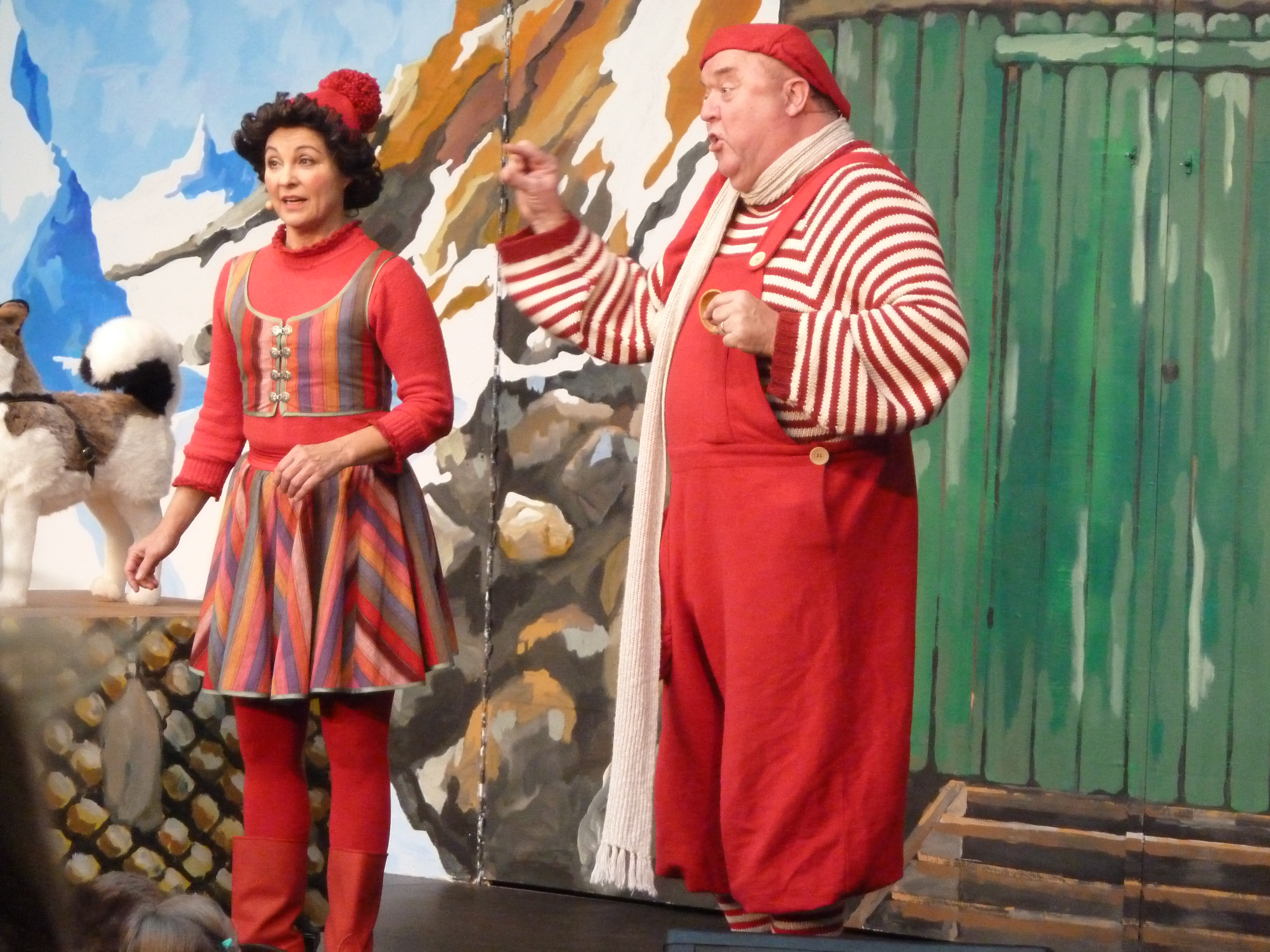
Ann Hjort and Flemming Jensen in a Christmas show at Rødovre Centrum performing as Puk and Lunte from Nissebanden.

Ann Hjort (born October 11, 1956) is a Danish actress best known for her role as Puk in the 1989 television series Nissebanden i Grønland.

Hjort was educated at Aarhus Theatre in 1983. Whilst filming Nissebanden i Grønland she met her (now ex-) husband Finn Nielsen. In 1989-1990 she starred in the musical Kielgasten with Kim Larsen and others.

She has also voiced many cartoons including The Lion King (Danish: Løvernes Konge) and The Pink Panther (Danish: Den lyserøde panter).

== Movies ==
- Når engle elsker (1985) – Meta Nielsen
- Kærlighed ved første desperate blik (1994)
- Belma (1995) – Nurse
- Kandidaten (2008) – Eva Schiller
- En enkelt til Korsør (2008) – Birthe

=== TV series ===
- Nissebanden i Grønland (julekalender) (1989) – Puk
- Hvide løgne (1998) – Helle Blom, doctor
- Finn'sk fjernsyn (1999) – Different roles
- Rejseholdet, afsnit 28 (2002) – Vibs
- Nikolaj og Julie, afsnit 18 (2003) – Doctor
- Ørnen, afsnit 4 (2004) – Doctor Susanne Helmer
- Klovn, afsnit 23 og 28 (2006) – Ann
- Lærkevej, 5 afsnit (2009) – Lizzie
- Store Drømme (2009) - Sofias mom

=== Cartoons ===
- Scooby Doo – Vera
- Max og Mule (1992) – Pia
- Løvernes Konge (1994) – Sarafine
- Toy Story (1995) – Bodil
- Dexters Laboratorium (1996) – Mom
- Hercules (1997) – Hera
- Ko og Kylling (1997–2001) – Mom/mrs teacher
- Johnny Bravo (1997) – Bunny Bravo/Lille Suzie
- Pokémon (1998) – Jessie
- Toy Story 2 (1999) – Bodil
- Hercules (2000–2003) – Some voices
- Cubix (2001–2005) – Hela Nemo
- Kim Possible (2002) – Bonnie
- Jungledyret Hugo (2003–2004) – Some voices
- Der var engang..., afsnit 12–14, 22-23 (2005) – Some voices
- Spionfamilien (2007) – Talia Bannon
