= Speed Walking =

2014 film by Niels Arden Oplev

- Directed by: Niels Arden Oplev
- Written by: Bo hr. Hansen
- Based on: Kapgang by Morten Kirkskov
- Produced by: Thomas Heinesen
- Starring: Anders W. Berthelsen; Sidse Babett Knudsen; Pilou Asbæk; Villads Bøye; David Dencik
- Cinematography: Rasmus Videbæk
- Edited by: Anne Østerud
- Music by: Jacob Groth
- Distributed by: Nordisk Film
- Release date: 28 August 2014
- Running time: 108 minutes
- Country: Denmark
- Language: Danish

Speed Walking (Danish: Kapgang) is a 2014 Danish drama film directed by Niels Arden Oplev. It is based on the novel of the same name by Morten Kirkskov.

== Plot ==
In 1976 in provincial Denmark, 14-year-old Martin (Villads Bøye) is about to be confirmed when his mother dies of cancer. The weeks leading up to his confirmation are difficult and turbulent, as Martin's father and older brother are distraught and Martin must try to keep the family together. In addition, he must deal with his feelings, sexuality and friendships.

== Cast ==
- Villads Bøye as Martin
- Frederik Winther Rasmussen as Kim
- Kraka Donslund Nielsen as Kristine
- Anders W. Berthelsen as Hans
- Sidse Babett Knudsen as Lizzie
- Pilou Asbæk as Onkel Kristian
- Bodil Lassen as Grandmother
- Kurt Ravn as Grandfather
- Jens Jørn Spottag
- Jakob Lohmann
- Christine Gjerulff
- Anette Støvelbæk
- Kristian Halken
- Steen Stig Lommer
- Stine Stengade
- Anne Louise Hassing
- David Dencik
- Sveinn Runar Ingvarsson
