= Trine Pallesen =

Danish actress

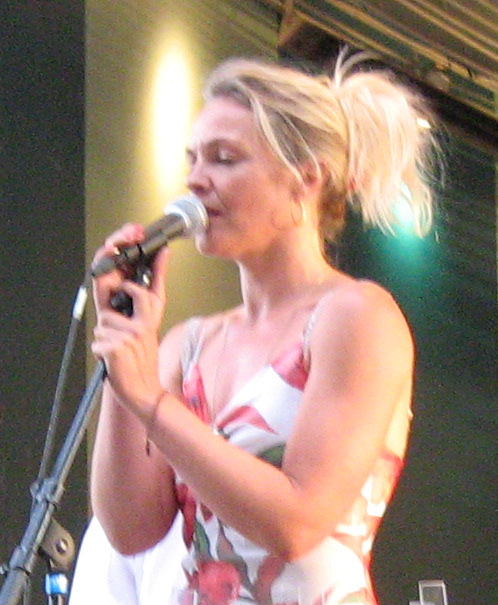
- Trine Pallesen with Promenadeorkestret in Tivoli Gardens, Copenhagen (2009)
- Born: 19 June 1969 (age 56); Denmark
- Occupation: Actress
- Years active: 1982 - present
- Known for: Rejseholdet, Forbrydelsen
- Parent: Per Pallesen

Trine Pallesen (born 19 June 1969) is a Danish actress, best known for her work in Danish TV series Rejseholdet and Forbrydelsen.

Pallesen was born in Denmark, daughter of Per Pallesen and Kirsten Peüliche.

== Filmography ==
=== Films ===
- Ballerup Boulevard (1986)
- Pakten (1995)
- A Corner of Paradise (1997)
- Little Big Girl (2002)
- Se dagens lys (TV movie, 2003)
- The Lost Treasure of the Knights Templar II (2007)
- The Pig (short, 2008)
- Sex, Drugs & Taxation (2013)
- Nøgle hus spejl (2015)

=== TV series ===
- Familien Krahne (1982)
- Sea Dragon (1990)
- Ugeavisen (1991)
- Strisser på Samsø (1997)
- Rejseholdet (2000–2004)
- 2900 Happiness (2009)
- Forbrydelsen (2012)
