= Little Big Girl (film) =

- Directed by: Morten Køhlert
- Starring: Sarah Juel Werner; Trine Pallesen
- Release date: 14 June 2002
- Running time: 88 minutes
- Country: Denmark
- Language: Danish

Little Big Girl (Danish: Ulvepigen Tinke) is a 2002 Danish children's film directed by Morten Køhlert based on the book Hungerbarnet by Cecil Bødker.
