= What No One Knows =

- Theatrical poster
- Det som ingen ved
- Directed by: Søren Kragh-Jacobsen
- Written by: Rasmus Heisterberg; Søren Kragh-Jacobsen
- Produced by: Lars Bredo Rahbek
- Starring: Anders W. Berthelsen; Maria Bonnevie; Ghita Nørby; Lars Mikkelsen
- Cinematography: Morten Søborg
- Edited by: Janus Billeskov Jansen
- Music by: Anders Trentemøller
- Production company: Nimbus Film
- Distributed by: Sandrew Metronome
- Release date: 12 June 2008 (Denmark)
- Running time: 99 min.
- Countries: Denmark; Sweden
- Languages: Danish; Swedish

What No One Knows (Danish: Det som ingen ved) is a 2008 Danish political thriller film written and directed by Søren Kragh-Jacobsen, and starring Anders W. Berthelsen, Maria Bonnevie, Ghita Nørby, and Lars Mikkelsen. The film was produced by Nimbus Film.

== Plot ==
A young woman is found drowned on a winter night by the sea. The dead woman's brother, Thomas, discovers that her death is connected to their father, now deceased, and his work in military intelligence. As Thomas digs deeper into the case his family is brought into sudden danger.

== Cast ==
- Anders W. Berthelsen – Thomas Deleuran
- Maria Bonnevie – Ursula
- Ghita Nørby – Ingrid Deleuran
- Henning Jensen (actor) – Lange-Erichsen
- Marie Louise Wille – Marianne
- Mette Gregersen – Liv
- Lars Mikkelsen – Marc Deleuran
- Sarah Juel Werner – Bea
- Jonas Schmidt – Claus Jensen
- Sarah Boberg – Amalie
- Claus Gerving – Tyrfing agent
- Kim Sønderholm – Tyrfing agent
- Karl Bille – Truck driver
- Sonja Richter – Charlotte Deleuran
- Rita Angela – Old lady
- Baard Owe – Hemmingsen
- Christian Grønvall – Waiter
- Rebekka Owe – Margrethe
- Vibeke Hastrup – Miss Lange-Erichsen
- Torben Jensen (actor) – Voice in telephone
