= Let's Get Lost (1997 film) =

1997 Danish improvisational comedy film by Jonas Elmer

- DVD cover
- Directed by: Jonas Elmer
- Written by: Jonas Elmer
- Produced by: Per Holst
- Starring: Sidse Babett Knudsen; Bjarne Henriksen; Troels Lyby; Nicolaj Kopernikus
- Cinematography: Steffen Led Sørensen; Bo Tengberg
- Edited by: Mette Zeruneith
- Music by: Nikolaj Egelund; Povl Kristian
- Distributed by: Dansk Novellefilm; Det Danske Filminstitut
- Release date: 19 September 1997
- Running time: 96 minutes
- Country: Denmark
- Language: Danish

Let's Get Lost is a 1997 Danish film written and directed by Jonas Elmer and produced by Per Holst. The film is a slice of life comedy, improvisational and shot in black and white. The film earned the 1998 Bodil Award for Best Danish Film and shared the Robert Award for Best Danish Film with Barbara.

== Plot ==
Julie has been abandoned by her boyfriend and seeks revenge. Mogens borrowed her sofa for a weekend but has been living there for the past 13 years. He aspires to become a composer but is living on welfare. Thomas wants to become a writer but is still struggling with his first chapter and works as a hospital porter. Steffen is deceiving the unemployment insurance system. The three daydreaming young men are occupying Julie's apartment while enjoying beer, television and football.

== Cast ==
- Sidse Babett Knudsen as Julie
- Bjarne Henriksen as Mogens
- Nicolaj Kopernikus as Steffen
- Troels Lyby as Thomas
- Jesper Asholt as Lille John
- Martin Kongstad as Rene
- Mette Agnethe Horn as Charlotte
- Tine Bernhard Nielsen as Vanja
- Cecilie Brask as Signe
- Vera Gebuhr as Mrs. Rothstein
- Svend Gehrs as television commentator
- Michael Laudrup as himself

== Production ==
The film was produced by Dansk Novellefilm and Per Holst Filmproduktion. Elmer's script was only an outline which required the actors to improvise their roles and dialogue.

Sidse Babett Knudsen made her film debut in the lead role of the character, Julie. Knudsen said she was not very good at improvisation and accepted the part only because she thought it would be a lightweight summer comedy.

== Reception ==
The film became a breakout hit in Denmark and Knudsen received both the Robert Award and the Bodil Award for Best Actress. Critics called Knudsen's performance dominating. Film critic Kim Skotte of Politiken wrote that Knudsen had hit a new tone with a "special ability to capture the modern woman's uncertainty and strength."

The film earned the 1998 Bodil Award for Best Danish Film and shared the Robert Award for Best Danish Film with Barbara.
