= Aalborg Teater =

Theatre in Aalborg, Denmark

Coordinates: 57.047014°N 9.916667°E

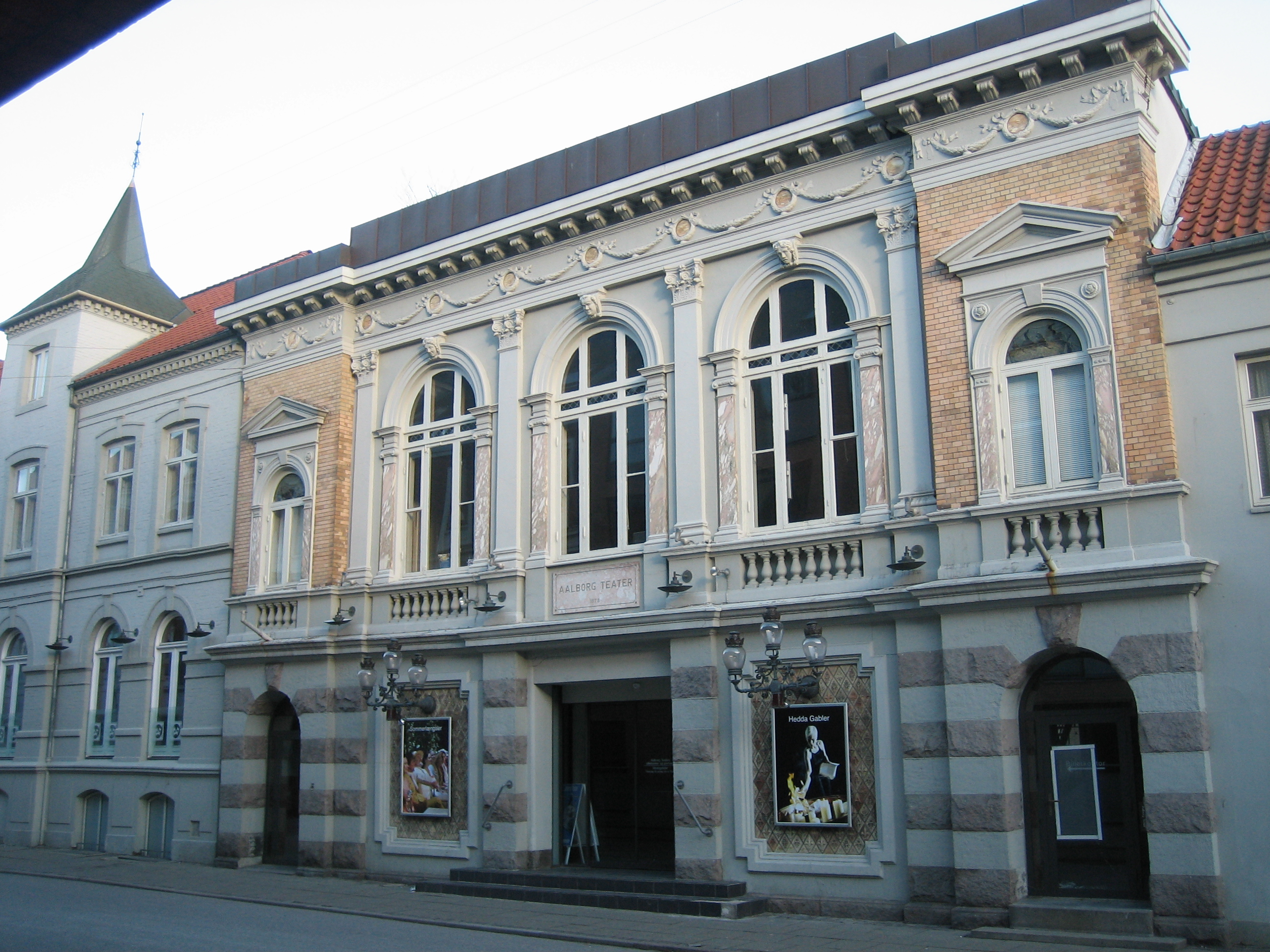
Aalborg Teater

Aalborg Teater is the main theatre in Aalborg, Denmark. Built in 1878, it was subsequently modified by Julius Petersen and was remodeled in 2000. Its address is still Jernbanegade (Railway Street), although the station and the theatre have both moved. The theatre has three stages and seats 870 in the main auditorium. There are 10-12 annual productions with a total of 250-400 performances, covering a wide selection of drama and musicals. Originally privately owned, it is now controlled and owned by the Danish Ministry of Culture. While most productions are housed in the main hall, the building can accommodate up to four shows in its other halls.

== History ==
When the railway reached Aalborg at the end of the 1860s, the newly constructed Jernbanegade (Railway Street) provided an ideal site for Grøntved, the local butcher, to build a theatre. Completed in 1878, initially it could accommodate audiences of almost 1,110 as there were many cheap standing places. Julius Petersen, one of the leading directors in the provinces, bought the theatre in 1882 and shortly afterwards married Grøntved's daughter, Anne, who played a leading role in the theatre's development.

Petersen undertook major modifications to the building, providing seating for 500 in the stalls and 370 on the balcony. The stage was extended and more powerful gas lighting was installed (to be replaced in 1921 by electric light). In 1914, on his 70th birthday, Petersen transferred ownership of the theatre to the city, receiving an allowance and a box seat in return. Under the city's administration, a number of directors were appointed in fairly rapid succession, as they all experienced difficulties in making ends meet. In 1937, Jakob Nielsen from Frederiksberg's Betty Nansen Teatret took over and appointed a new company of actors. Despite limited budgets, he was able to present 15 productions in the first season, acting in 14 of them himself. During the Second World War, the Germans commandeered the theatre as a cinema for their troops but it was reopened in September 1945. Over the years the theatre has been run by the municipality or the region but it is now one of four theatres in the hands of the Danish Ministry of Culture, the others being Odense Teater, Aarhus Teater and the Royal Danish Theatre in Copenhagen.

== Directors ==
- 1869 Slagtermester Niels Grøntved
- 1878 N. F. Svendsen
- 1878 Frederik Schmidt
- 1882-96 Julius Petersen
- 1896-1900 Oddgeir Stephensen
- 1900-1909 Axel Jacobsen
- 1914 Julius Petersen
- 1915-1920 Sv. Wedel
- 1920-1921 Jacob Jacobsen
- 1921-1922 Gerda Christophersen (in training)
- 1922-1928 Peter Kjær
- 1928-1932 Gerda Christophersen
- 1932-34 (no director)
- 1934-1937 Otto Jacobsen
- 1937-1940 Jakob Nielsen and Bjarne Forchhammer
- 1940-1941 Jakob Nielsen
- 1941-1945 (not in operation)
- 1945-1954 Poul Petersen
- 1954-1960 Bjarne Forchhammer
- 1960-1965 Karen Marie Løwert
- 1965-1968 Poul Petersen
- 1968-1973 Ebbe Langberg
- 1973-1981 Leon Feder
- 1981-1985 Daniel Bohr
- 1985-1994 Mogens Pedersen
- 1994-2001 Malene Schwartz
- 2001-2011 Geir Sveaass
- 2011- present Morten Kirkskov
