= Søren Juul Petersen =

Danish film producer

Søren Juul Petersen (born 10 October 1963) is a Danish independent film producer who in 1997 created the production company Zeitgeist, which has produced a number of fairly successful, award-winning theatrical feature films.

== Filmography ==
- Skyggen / Webmaster (1998)
- Regel nr. 1 (2003)
- Erik of het klein insectenboek (2004)
- Af banen / We Are the Champions (2005)
- Remix (2008)
- Det grå guld (2011)

== Sources ==
- Søren Juul Petersen at IMDb
- Official website
- Zeitgeist at DFI.dk
