= Strisser på Samsø =

- Genre: Crime
- Country of origin: Denmark
- Original language: Danish
- No. of seasons: 2
- No. of episodes: 12

Production
- Running time: 50 minutes

Original release
- Network: TV 2
- Release: 17 February 1997 – 21 November 1998

Strisser på Samsø (A Cop on Samsø) is a Danish television series consisting of 12 episodes, written and directed by Eddie Thomas Petersen. Produced by Per Holst Filmproduktion, it was first broadcast on TV2 in 1997-1998.

The story tells how Christian Torp, a police officer who has lost his wife in an unsuccessful robbery, brings his daughter Sille to the Danish island of Samsø looking for peace and quiet. They have difficulty in integrating into a society full of problems where everyone knows everything about everybody, but they find a friend in Ulla, a secretary. Among others, it stars Lars Bom, Andrea Vagn Jensen, Trine Pallesen, Amalie Dollerup, Jesper Milsted and Sidse Babett Knudsen. The series was entitled "Island Cop" when broadcast in subtitled form on Ireland's TG4 channel.
