= Cecilie (film) =

2007 film by Hans Fabian Wullenweber

- Directed by: Hans Fabian Wullenweber
- Written by: Nikolaj Arcel; Rasmus Heisterberg
- Starring: Sonja Richter; Anders W. Berthelsen
- Distributed by: Nordisk Film
- Release date: 1 June 2007
- Running time: 1h 33min
- Country: Denmark
- Language: Danish

Cecilie is a 2007 Danish horror film directed by Hans Fabian Wullenweber.

In 2008, the film has been nominated for the Robert Awards and Sonja Richter was nominated for the Bodil Prize for Best Actress.

== Cast ==
- Sonja Richter - Cecilie Larsen
- Anders W. Berthelsen - Per Hartmann
- Claus Riis Østergaard - Mads Larsen
- Kurt Ravn - Karsten Levinsen
- Lars Mikkelsen - Lasse N. Damgaard
- Morten Suurballe - Peter Thomassen
- Peder Holm Johansen - Michael Konnerup
- Julie Grundtvig Wester - Camilla Simonsen
- Petrine Agger - Louise, Lærer
- Thomas W. Gabrielsson - Peter, Genbo
- Mille Dinesen - Mette, Genbo
