= Iben Dorner =

Danish actress (born 1978)

- Born: Iben Amelieh Emine Dorner; 19 October 1978 (age 46); Holstebro, Denmark
- Occupations: Actress; voice artist
- Known for: Sorte kugler

Iben Amelieh Emine Dorner (previously Østergaard) (born 19 October 1978) is a Danish actress and voice artist.

== Education ==
Dorner graduated from the University of Copenhagen with a Bachelor of Arts in theatre and rhetoric in 2003. She later went to drama school at Odense Teater and graduated in 2007. In her first year at Odense Teater, she worked as part of an actor ensemble at a minor scene called Teater Momentum.

== Acting career ==
Dorner played the role of Electra at Odense Teater's staging of the Oresteia and Mrs. Martins in The Bald Singer in the 2008/2009 theatre season. She made her film debut playing Anders Matthesen's girlfriend in the 2009 film Sorte Kugler, for which she received a Zulu award for Best Supporting Actress in 2010.

Dorner has also participated in a number of television productions, including Borgen, and she has since 2002 been a voice artist. Her work in that field has included voicing Sam in the Danish version of Totally Spies, as well as Arcee in the Danish version of Transformers: Prime.

== Selected filmography ==
=== Film ===
List of film appearances, with year, title, and role shown
Year	Title	Role	Notes
2008	The Candidate	Schiller's Assistant	
2009	Sorte kugler	Dorthe Faunsbøll	
2010	Truth About Men	Trine	
2011	Bora Bora	Birthe	

=== Television ===
List of television appearances, with year, title, and role shown
Year	Title	Role	Notes
2009	Pagten	Helle	20 episodes
2010-11	Borgen	Sanne	13 episodes
2011	Those Who Kill	Benedicte Schaeffer	8 episodes
2020	Thin Ice	Katarina Iversen	7 episodes
2021	The Chestnut Man	Rosa Hartung	6 episodes
