= Sarah Juel Werner =

Danish actress (born 1992)

- Born: 27 July 1992 (age 33); Denmark
- Occupation: Actress
- Years active: 2002-present

Sarah Juel Werner (born 27 July 1992) is a Danish actress. She appeared in more than ten films since 2002.

== Selected filmography ==
Film
Year	Title	Role	Notes
2009	Træneren	Pernille	
2008	What No One Knows	Bea	
2008	Worlds Apart	Elisabeth	
2006	Absalons hemmelighed	Cecilie Berggren	
2005	Drømmen	Iben	
2004	Brothers	Natalia	
2003	The Inheritance	Marie-Louise	
2002	Little Big Girl	Tinke	
