= Sidse Babett Knudsen =

Danish actress (born 1968)

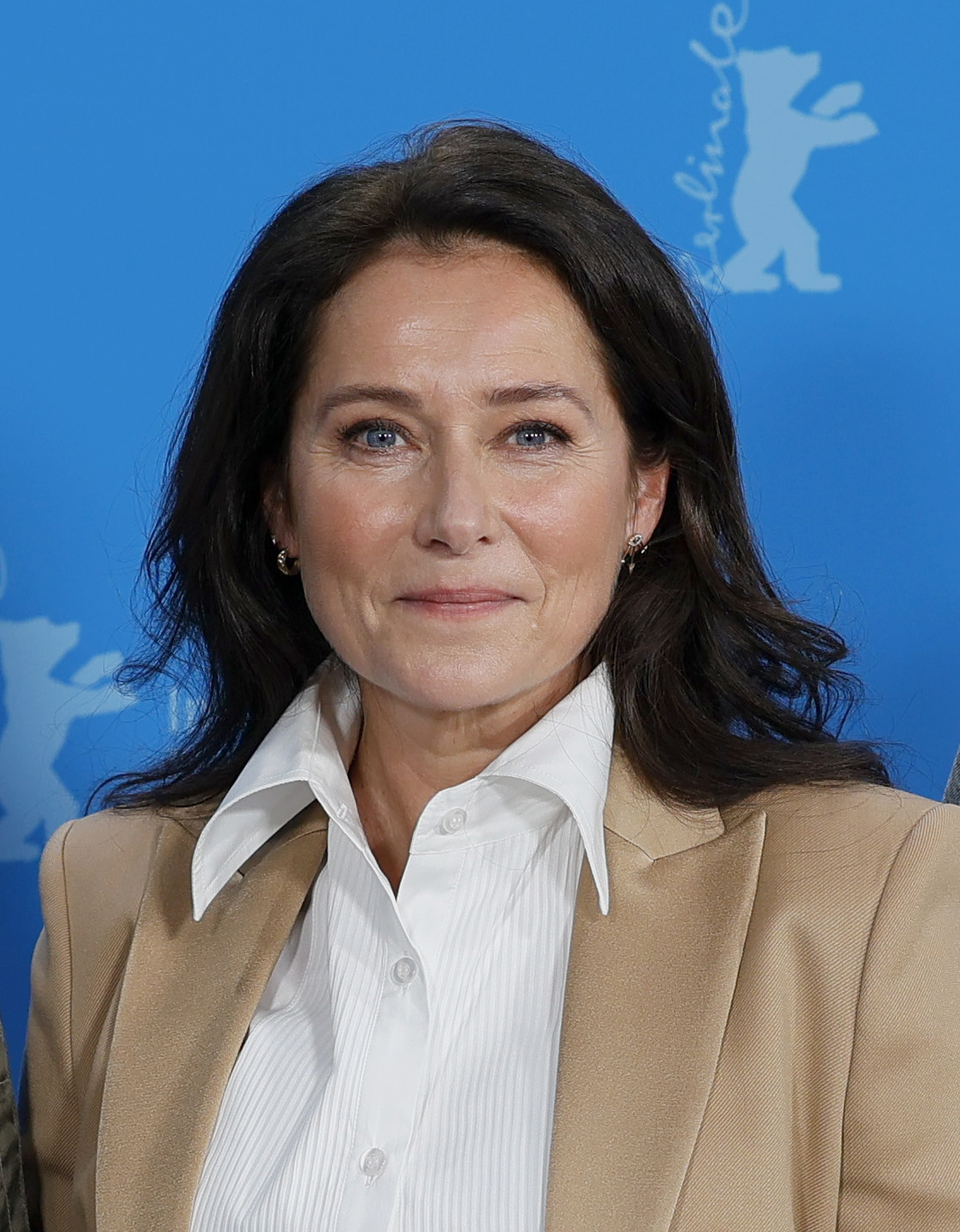
- Knudsen at 2024 Berlinale
- Born: 22 November 1968 (age 57); Copenhagen, Denmark
- Occupation: Actress
- Years active: 1994–present
- Children: 1

Sidse Babett Knudsen (Danish pronunciation: [ˈsisə ˈpæpet ˈkʰnusn̩]; born 22 November 1968) is a Danish actress who works in theatre, television, and film. Knudsen made her screen debut in the 1997 improvisational comedy Let's Get Lost, for which she received both the Robert and Bodil awards for Best Actress.

Following the critical success of her debut, Knudsen has been considered one of the top Danish actresses of her generation. In 2000, she again won both best actress awards for the comedy romance Den Eneste Ene (English title: The One and Only). In 2016, she won the César Award for Best Supporting Actress for the film Courted (L'Hermine). Knudsen has also received award nominations for her roles in Monas Verden (Mona's World) and Efter brylluppet (After the Wedding).

Knudsen achieved international recognition for her leading role as fictional Danish prime minister Birgitte Nyborg in the Danish TV series Borgen, and for her role as Theresa Cullen in the HBO science fiction-western television series Westworld.

== Personal life ==
Knudsen was born on 22 November 1968 in Copenhagen, the daughter of Ebbe Knudsen, a photographer, and Susanne Andersen, a school teacher. During her childhood, the family lived in Tanzania where her parents undertook volunteer work. Upon returning to Denmark, Knudsen attended a "creative school." Knudsen is unmarried and is the mother of one son born in 2004.

Knudsen speaks native Danish, and has native fluency in English and French.

== Acting career ==
From 1987 to 1990 Knudsen trained in acting at the Theatre de l'Ombre in Paris despite initially knowing little French. Upon returning to Denmark, Knudsen played roles for the experimental theatre OVINE 302 as well as at the Betty Nansen Theatre and the Royal Danish Theatre in Copenhagen.

In 1997 Knudsen debuted in the lead role of Julie in Jonas Elmer's slice-of-life comedy Let's Get Lost. The film's script was only an outline, requiring the actors to improvise their roles and dialogue. Knudsen said she was not very good at improvisation and accepted the part only because she thought it would be a lightweight summer comedy. The film became a breakout hit in Denmark and Knudsen received both the Robert Award and the Bodil Award for Best Actress. Critics called Knudsen's performance dominating. Film critic Kim Skotte of Politiken wrote that Knudsen had hit a new tone with a "special ability to capture the modern woman's uncertainty and strength".

Following her appearance in the 1998 mystery Motello, Knudsen played the lead character in Susanne Bier's 1999 romantic comedy Den Eneste Ene. The film became one of the decade's biggest box-office hits in Denmark. It marked a new direction in modern Danish romantic comedies with credit given to Knudsen's acting style. Knudsen's portrayal of Sus, a woman who becomes pregnant by her unfaithful husband while she loves another man, again earned her both the Robert Award and the Bodil Award for Best Actress.

Knudsen returned to work with Elmer in 2000 as the title character in the comedy Mona's Verden. As in Elmer's first film, Knudsen was required to improvise her dialogue and character. Knudsen's portrayal of Mona, an uptight accountant who tries to stave off the romantic infatuation of a bank robber while being held hostage, earned her a Bodil Award nomination for Best Actress.

In 2020 she starred in the BBC drama Roadkill as the mistress of a British Tory politician played by Hugh Laurie.

Knudsen reprised her role as prime minister Nyborg in the Netflix revival of Borgen, which was released in 2022.

== Filmography ==
=== Film ===
Year	Title	Role	Director	Notes
1997	Let's Get Lost	Julie	Jonas Elmer	
1997	Thérapie russe	Sidse	Eric Veniard	
1997	En stille død	Sally	Jannik Johansen	Short
1997	Fanny Farveløs	Mother	Natasha Arthy	Short
1998	Motello	Julie	Steen Rasmussen & Michael Wikke	
1999	The One and Only	Sus	Susanne Bier	
1999	Mifune's Last Song	Bibbi	Søren Kragh-Jacobsen	
2000	Mirakel	Mona Petersen	Natasha Arthy (3)	
2000	Max	Sarah 'Max' Engell	Trine Piil Christensen	
2001	Chop Chop	Rita	Niels Arden Oplev	
2001	Monas verden	Mona	Jonas Elmer (2)	
2002	Drengen der ville gøre det umulige	Woman	Jannik Hastrup	
2003	Se til venstre, der er en svensker	Katrine	Natasha Arthy (4)	
2003	Dogville : The Pilot	Grace	Lars von Trier	Short
2004	Villa Paranoia	Olga Holmgård	Erik Clausen	
2004	Fakiren fra Bilbao	Louise	Peter Flinth	
2004	Bjørno & Bingo	Bingo	Sabine Ravn	Short
2006	After the Wedding	Helene Hansson	Susanne Bier (2)	
2007	Til døden os skiller	Bente	Paprika Steen	
2008	Blå mænd	Lotte	Rasmus Heide	
2009	Over gaden under vandet	Anne	Charlotte Sieling	
2009	Æblet & ormen	Sylvia	Anders Morgenthaler & Mads Juul	
2010	Parterapi	Puk Agerbo	Kenneth Kainz	
2012	Sover Dolly på ryggen ?	Sandra	Hella Joof	
2014	The Duke of Burgundy	Cynthia	Peter Strickland	
2014	Speed Walking	Lizzi	Niels Arden Oplev (2)	
2015	Courted	Ditte Lorensen-Coteret	Christian Vincent	
2016	150 Milligrams	Irène Frachon	Emmanuelle Bercot	
2016	Inferno	Dr Elizabeth Sinskey	Ron Howard	
2016	A Hologram for the King	Hanne	Tom Tykwer	
2017	The Eternal Road	Sara	Antti-Jussi Annila	
2018	Vitello	Vitello's mother	Dorte Bengtson	Voice only
2018	In Fabric	Jill	Peter Strickland (2)	
2018	Holly På Sommerøen	Charlotte skovmyre	Karla Nor Holmbäck	Short
2019	Kaptajn Bimse	Sophie	Thomas Borch Nielsen & Kirsten Skytte	
2019	Askeladden - I Soria Moria slott	Ohlmann	Mikkel Brænne Sandemose	
2019	Undtagelsen (The Exception)	Anne-Lise	Jesper W. Nielsen	Based on Christian Jungersen's 2004 novel
2019	The Translators	Helene Tuxen	Régis Roinsard	
2020	Kød og blod	Bodil	Jeanette Nordahl	
2020	Limbo	Helga	Ben Sharrock	
2023	Club Zero	Ms Dorset	Jessica Hausner	
2023	Ehrengard: The Art of Seduction	The Grand Duchess	Bille August	
2023	Woaca	Woaca	Mackenzie Davis	Short
2024	Sons	Eva Hansen	Gustav Möller	Premiere at the 74th Berlin International Film Festival
2025	The Great Arch (L'Inconnu du Grande Arche)	Liv von Spreckelsen	Stéphane Demoustier	
2025	The Family Plan 2	Svetlana Romanova	Simon Cellan Jones	
2026	What Lies Between Us	Anne Sofie	Amalie Næsby Fick	

=== Television ===
Year	Title	Role	Director	Notes
1995	Juletestamentet	Mercedes	Nikolaj Cederholm	23 Episodes
1996	Charlot og Charlotte	Helle	Ole Bornedal	Miniseries
1997	Drengen de kaldte Kylling	Mercedes	Natasha Arthy	Miniseries
1997	Taxa	Milla	Anders Refn	1 Episodes
1997	Gufol mysteriet	Weeping Woman	Morten Lorentzen	1 Episodes
1998	Strisser på Samsø	Hanne Jensen	Eddie Thomas Petersen	2 Episodes
2004	Proof	Nina Kutpreka	Ciaran Donnelly	4 Episodes
2010–2022	Borgen	Birgitte Nyborg	Jesper W. Nielsen	38 Episodes
2014	1864	Johanne Luise Heiberg	Ole Bornedal	Miniseries
2016	Westworld	Theresa Cullen	Jonathan Nolan	8 Episodes
2017	Philip K. Dick's Electric Dreams	Jill	Marc Munden	Episode: "Crazy Diamond"
2018	The Simpsons	Woman in bar	Michael Polcino	Episode: "Throw Grampa from the Dane"
2018	Vitello	Vitello's Mother	Dorte Bengtson	13 Episodes
2019	The Accident	Harriet Paulsen	Sandra Goldbacher	Miniseries
2020	Roadkill	Madeleine Halle	Michael Keillor	Miniseries
2025	Prime Target	Professor Andrea Lavin	Brady Hood	Miniseries
2026	Kill Jackie	Karenina	Damon Thomas, Dawn Shadforth & Sophie Muller	Miniseries

== Awards and nominations ==
Year	Award	Category	Work	Result
1998	Bodil Award	Best Actress in a Leading Role	Let's Get Lost	Won
1998	Robert Awards	Best Actress	Let's Get Lost	Won
2000	Bodil Award	Best Actress in a Leading Role	The One and Only	Won
2000	Robert Awards	Best Actress	The One and Only	Won
2002	Bodil Award	Best Actress in a Leading Role	Monas verden	Nominated
2003	Robert Awards	Best Actress	Se til venstre, der er en svensker	Nominated
2006	Bodil Award	Best Actress in a Leading Role	After the Wedding	Nominated
2006	Robert Awards	Best Actress	After the Wedding	Nominated
2006	Rouen Nordic Film Festival	Best Actress	After the Wedding	Won
2006	Zulu Award	Best Actress	After the Wedding	Won
2008	Zulu Award	Best Supporting Actress	Blå mænd	Won
2010	Zulu Award	Best Actress	Parterapi	Won
2012	Monte-Carlo Television Festival	Outstanding Actress - Drama Series	Borgen	Won
2012	International Emmy Award	Best Actress	Borgen	Nominated
2014	Torino Film Festival	Best Actress	The Duke of Burgundy	Won
2015	Bodil Award	Best Actress in a Supporting Role	Speed Walking	Nominated
2015	Robert Awards	Best Actress	Speed Walking	Nominated
2016	César Award	Best Supporting Actress	Courted	Won
2017	César Award	Best Actress	150 Milligrams	Nominated
2017	Lumière Awards	Best Actress	150 Milligrams	Nominated
2018	Jussi Awards	Jussi Award for Best Supporting Actress	The Eternal Road	Won
2021	Bodil Award	Best Actress in a Supporting Role	Undtagelsen	Nominated
2021	Robert Awards	Best Supporting Actress	Undtagelsen	Nominated
2021	Bodil Award	Best Actress in a Supporting Role	Kød og blod	Won
2021	Robert Awards	Best Supporting Actress	Kød og blod	Nominated
2022	Rose d'Or	Performance of the Year	Borgen	Won
2023	Robert Awards	Best Actress in a Leading Television Role	Borgen	Nominated
2025	Bodil Award	Best Actress	Sons	Won
