= Henrik Prip =

Danish film, television, and voice actor

- Born: 31 March 1960 (age 66); Hellerup, Denmark
- Occupation: Actor
- Years active: 1994-present

Henrik Prip (born 31 March 1960) is a Danish actor. He appeared in more than sixty films since 1994.

== Selected filmography ==
Film
Year	Title	Role	Notes
2016	Cloudstruck Drive	Jørgen	Winner, with Julie Christiansen, of the Best Couple category at the 1996 Top Shorts Film Festival
2008	Remix		
2008	The Candidate	Henrik Linde	
2007	At Night		
2006	The Boss of It All	Nalle	
2004	In Your Hands		
2002	Minor Mishaps		
2002	Okay		
1998	The Idiots	Ped	Nominated for the Palme d'Or at the 1998 Cannes Film Festival

TV
Year	Title	Role	Notes
2009-2010	Park Road		
2014	1864		

Dubbing
Year	Title	Role	Notes
2012	The Legend of Korra	Amon	Danish voice
