= Bora Bora (2011 film) =

2011 film

- Film poster
- Directed by: Hans Fabian Wullenweber
- Written by: Hans Fabian Wullenweber
- Produced by: Stine Spang-Hansen
- Starring: Sarah-Sofie Boussnina
- Cinematography: Jacob Kusk
- Release date: 1 September 2011
- Running time: 76 minutes
- Country: Denmark
- Language: Danish

Bora Bora is a 2011 Danish musical drama film written and directed by Hans Fabian Wullenweber.

== Cast ==
- Sarah-Sofie Boussnina as Mia Christensen
- Janus Dissing Rathke as Zack
- Mette Gregersen as Silja
- Adnan Al-Adhami as Azim
- Iben Dorner as Birthe
- Jimmy Jørgensen as Simon
- Johan Philip Asbæk as Jim
- Christian Grønvall as Betjent

== Plot ==
Mia is a girl who is dealing with feeling lonely and out of place in her life, she's longing for something different and feels lost and alone, given that her mom works all the time and when she doesn't she's still too stressed to have time for Mia. This leads Mia to use running as her only escape from reality, since she's a good runner and it's the only time where she feels free from the mundane going-ons of everyday life. One day, she runs into Zack - a pickpocket. At first he pickpockets her, using a trick where he pretends to be hurt. But later on he tries to use the same trick on the same street while Mia is crossing it, causing Mia to get suspicious. She confronts Zack and he admits he stole her purse. The two have a chat at a café, and Mia inquires about Zack's thievery. This leads Zack to admit that he is in a group of young pick-pockets who are squatting at an abandoned mansion, he introduces her to everyone there and suggests that she could become part of their group. Here she meets the whole gang, and is introduced to the leader, Silja, who doesn't quite trust Mia at first. Mia learns that she isn't the only one with a troubled homelife, after the others start an arms-race in order to see who has the worst past. Mia feels at home with the other misfits, seeing that most of their stories are even more tragic than hers, but they all found solace in the group. After testing Mia's abilities, she recognizes her talent for running and agrees to invite her into the gang. Mia decides this is the life she wants, leaving everything else behind to join the group. Mia soon discovers that this isn't the free life she thought it would be, as Silja rules and dictates the group. She's made a ruleset that includes the rule "No dating inside the gang." - This is upsetting to Mia, as over time she and Zack develop mutual feelings of love. She asks Zack why Silja doesn't allow group-members to date, and he admits that he used to date Silja, and she has a large crush on him. Meanwhile, the gang have been saving up their loot in order to create their own place of freedom, without any adults. Deciding to travel to Bora-Bora once they can afford it. Mia and Zack soon decide to date in secret but are discovered by Silja shortly after she announces that they can afford the travel at long last. Mia is saddened by the news, knowing that even at the island she won't be free and would keep on having to date Zack in secret, until she realises Silja has found out about them. Silja reveals that she wants to travel away only with Zack and the money, and leave the rest of the gang behind. Mia confronts Silja about this, and a fight ensues, leading to Silja getting arrested when she's found with all the money, and Mia deciding that this is not the life for her. She goes back to school, and back home, and chooses to continue dating Zack freely now.
