= Morten Kirkskov =

Danish actor, theater director, and writer

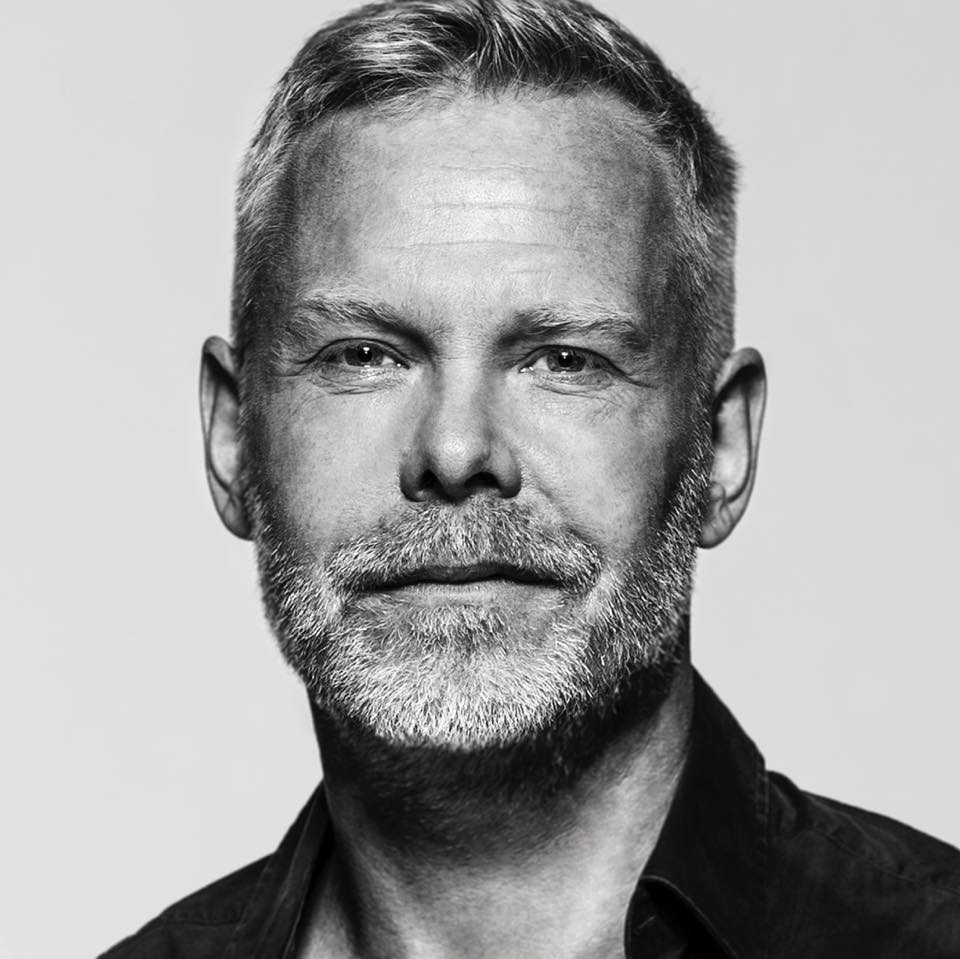
Kirkskov in 2016

Morten Kirkskov (born 28 March 1963) is a Danish actor, theatre director and writer. He was appointed artistic director of the Royal Danish Playhouse for the Royal Danish Theatre in Copenhagen in 2015.

== Career ==
Morten Kirkskov graduated from drama school at Odense Theatre in 1990 and has appeared on stage in a number of performances at the Royal Danish Theatre, Østre Gasværk Teater, Aalborg Theatre and Mungo Park. Since 1998 he has been a teacher at the Danish National School of Theatre. He was the artistic manager of the Aalborg Teater from 2011 to 2015.

Kirkskov is known for his role in the 2001 comedy-drama Shake It All About along with several supporting roles in major Danish drama series including Borgen.

In 2010, he made his debut as a writer with the autobiographical novel Kapgang, which in 2014 was adapted into a feature film with the English title Speed Walking, directed by acclaimed Danish director Niels Arden Oplev.

He directed the critically acclaimed production of Eugene O'Neill's Long Day's Journey into Night at the Royal Danish Playhouse and won the Reumert Award for Best Director in 2017.

In September 2017, Kirkskov returned to the stage where he starred in a modern production of Ingmar Bergman's Scenes from a Marriage alongside Sofie Gråbøl of The Killing. The successful production debuted its first international performance in October 2018 at the Sydney Opera House in Sydney, Australia, where he shared the stage with acclaimed Danish actress Stine Stengade.

Kirkskov directed a production of Shakespeare's Hamlet at the Royal Danish Playhouse, which premiered in September 2020. The highly-praised production starred renowned Danish actor Esben Smed in the title role.

== Personal life ==
Kirkskov is in a relationship with architect Kaan Alpagut.

== Filmography ==
=== Film ===
- Walk with Me (2016)
- A Conspiracy of Faith (2016)
- Boys on Film 11 - We Are Animals (2014)
- The Keeper of Lost Causes (2013)
- A Funny Man (2011)
- Daisy Diamond (2007)
- Brothers (2004)
- The Tenth Muse (TV Movie) (2003)
- Shake It All About (2001)
- Kuren (TV Movie) (2001)
- Isle of Darkness (1997)
- Værelse 17 (TV Movie) (1993)

=== Television ===
- Borgen (2010-2013, 2022)
- Badehotellet (2020)
- Herrens Veje (2018)
- Greyzone (2018)
- Lykke (2018)
- Pros and Cons (2014-2017)
- Lykke (2012)
- Sommer (2008)
- The Eagle (2004-2006)
- Hotellet (2001-2002)
- Bryggeren (1996-1997)
- Landsbyen (1991-1996)

=== As writer ===
- Speed Walking - based on the novel Kapgang (2014)
- Rosa Morena (2010)
- Three Summers (short) - part of Boys on Film (2006)

== Awards and prizes ==
- Reumert prize for Best Director - nomination (2021)
- Reumert prize for Best Director (2017)
- Danish Rainbow Awards - nomination (2018)
- Robert Award for Best Screenplay - nomination (2012)
- Sam Besekov Honorary Award (2009)
- Ole Haslund's Artist Foundation Honorary Award (2006)
- Erik Mork Honorary Award (2003)
- Lauritzen Award (1997)
- Olaf Ussing Honorary Award (1997)
