= Klatretøsen =

- DVD cover
- Directed by: Hans Fabian Wullenweber
- Written by: Nikolaj Arcel; Erlend Loe
- Produced by: Bo Ehrhardt; Lottie Terp Jakobsen
- Starring: Julie Zangenberg; Stefan Pagels Andersen; Mads Ravn; Anders W. Berthelsen
- Distributed by: Nimbus Film
- Release date: January 25, 2002
- Running time: 90 minutes
- Language: Danish
- Budget: US$2.2 million

Klatretøsen (English: The Climbing Girl, released in the US as A Death Sentence) is a 2002 Danish crime comedy film directed by Hans Fabian Wullenweber. The film's tagline is "The gutsiest girl since Pippi Longstocking."

Klatretøsen was produced by Nimbus Film.

== Plot ==
Ida, with help from her two best friends, Sebastian and Jonas, robs the bank where her mother works, to get the money to save her dying father who needs a specialty surgery. During the heist, the kids overcome high-tech security systems, guard dogs, and a nasty head of security to get to a bank vault suspended 100 feet off the ground.

== Cast ==
- Julie Zangenberg as Ida Johansen
- Stefan Pagels Andersen as Sebastian Klausen
- Mads Ravn as Jonas Balgaard
- William Haugaard Petersen as William Johansen
- Lars Bom as Klaus Johansen – Ida's father
- Nastja Arcel as Maria Johansen – Ida's mother
- Anders W. Berthelsen as Henrik (guard)
- Casper Jexlev Fomsgaard as Johnny Klausen
- Jens Brygmann as Hartmann

== Reception ==
The film has been recognised as "a good film for kids" and "all good fun".

== Accolades ==
The film won the Starboy award for the best children's film at Oulu International Children's and Youth Film Festival in 2002. It won the Robert Award for Best Children's Film at the 2003 Robert Awards.

== American remake ==
An American remake of this Danish blockbuster was released in 2004 titled Catch That Kid.
