= Ole Henriksen =

Danish skin cosmetician

- Born: May 4, 1951 (age 75); Nibe, Denmark
- Occupations: Skin Care, Day spa, Author
- Website: OleHenriksen.com

Ole Henriksen (born May 4, 1951, in Nibe, Denmark) is a Danish skin cosmetician and manufacturer of skin care products. He currently lives in the United States. (Not to be confused with Ole Henriksen, co-founder of Borland).

== Early years ==
Ole Henriksen was born and raised in a small town of Nibe, Denmark. After an impoverished upbringing, Henriksen travelled to Indonesia, during which time his skin became inflamed with cystic acne. He was treated by an aesthetician named Lagita, at a clinic in Jakarta.

The successful treatment, performed with various botanicals, peaked Henriksen's interest in skin care. Henriksen moved to London to pursue degrees in skin care and cosmetic chemistry, before moving to the United States.

He moved to San Francisco for a year and before moving to Los Angeles to open his first spa. It was after The Los Angeles Times ran a short story on him that he began attracting a celebrity clientele and his spa remains a constant hot spot for socialites and celebrities to have their skin pampered.

Henriksen uses his kitchen to experiment with all kinds of raw materials.

== Business ==
His spa business, based on Sunset Boulevard in Los Angeles, has been running for three decades. The spa has been the preferred skin care clinic for countless of Hollywood celebrities, recording artists and other high profiled customers for years. Henriksen sold his Sunset spa business to employee Vance Soto in 2013. The Ole Henriksen skin care product business operates from Van Nuys. The product line is available in over 12 countries and has won several awards. Henriksen serves as the company's Creative Director after he sold the product line to LVMH in February 2011 for an undisclosed amount.

== Personal life ==
Henriksen resides part-time in the Hollywood Hills with his husband, Laurence Roberts. The couple's other home is in Copenhagen, Denmark. The couple married in 2008 shortly before same-sex marriage in California was placed on hold in the State by Proposition 8. In 2011, Henriksen became the first male recipient to receive the Grevinde Danners Ærespris—a Danish honorary award presented by the Danner Foundation in recognition of achievements in women's and children's rights. Henriksen was awarded for speaking publicly about abusive relationships of which Henriksen himself was a victim prior to meeting Laurence Roberts. In 2014, Henriksen became a naturalized U.S. citizen. In 2017, Henriksen and Roberts purchased a residence in Copenhagen, Denmark where they currently have lived since 2018.

== Public appearances and television ==
Henriksen gained a renewed attention with his show Ole Henriksen's Hollywood on Danish TV2 in 2007, where he invited six well-known Danish men to his clinic in Hollywood for a complete treatment.

In 2014, Henriksen appeared in a Danish documentary, Jeg vil være Ole Henriksen (I Want to Become Ole Henriksen), created and hosted by Danish journalist Ole Juncker in which Juncker follows Henriksen in his daily routines for weeks with the intent of adapting Henriksen's famous, positive mindset and cheerful personality.

As of November 6, 2019, Henriksen will star in a television series to be broadcast on Danish Television channel TV2 titled Ole elsker Danmark (Ole Loves Denmark) where he is followed by a camera crew around the country.

Henriksen was the Marine Park speaker voice in the official Danish-dubbed version of Finding Dory.

== Discography ==
He was featured in a major release single called "Dope" by Danish duo band PULS that reached Top 3 on Tracklisten, the official Danish Singles Chart in 2011.

Featured in

Year	Song	Peak	Album
Year	Song	DK	Album
2011	"Dope" (PULS feat. Ole Henriksen)	3	PULS EP; Platin
