= Remix (film) =

- Directed by: Martin Hagbjer
- Written by: Martin Hagbjer; Anders Valbro
- Produced by: Søren Juul Petersen
- Starring: Micky Skeel Hansen; Camilla Bendix; Jakob Cedergren; Sofie Lassen-Kahlke
- Cinematography: Anders Löfstedt
- Edited by: Marie-Louise Bordinggaard
- Music by: Martin Hagbjer
- Distributed by: Scanbox
- Release date: 25 January 2008
- Country: Denmark
- Language: Danish

Remix is a Danish 2008 feature film directed by Martin Hagbjer starring Micky Skeel Hansen as a 16-year-old pop singer Ruben. Remix is inspired by the true story of Danish pop idol Jon Gade Nørgaard known by the mononym Jon. Jon was also the subject of the documentary feature film Solo released in 2007. The film was released on 25 January 2008.

== Synopsis ==
Ruben (played by Micky Skeel Hansen), an aspiring young man is offered a record contract by the music executive Tanya (portrayed by Camilla Bendix). The film, which co-stars Jakob Cedergren, Sofie Lassen-Kahlke, Henrik Prip and Anette Støvelbæk, follows Ruben's fall from grace in the hands of the music industry.

== Cast ==
- Micky Skeel Hansen - (Ruben)
- Camilla Bendix - (Clara)
- Jakob Cedergren - (Jes)
- Anette Støvelbæk - (Lone, Ruben's mother)
- Kristian Halken - (Flemming, Ruben's father)
- Thomas Waern Gabrielsson - (Michael)
- Henrik Prip - (Mark)
- Sofie Lassen-Kahlke - (Robinson Tanja)
- Kim Sønderholm - (Stig)
- Kasper Warrer Krogager - (Ruben's friend)
- Svend Laurits Læssø Larsen - (Victor, Rubens friend)
- Jarl Friis-Mikkelsen - (Studievært)
- Johan H. Kjellgren - (Björn)
- Carina Due - (Disco pige)
- Søren Juul Petersen - (Stengade conferencier)
- Marcelino Ballarin - (music video instructor)
- Christian Geisnæs - (photographer)
- Sune Bjørnvig - (young man)
- Caspar Møller - (Ruben's friend)
- Georgios Alexander Fylakouris - (Ruben's friend)
- Peter Lehmann - (recording engineer)
- Cajsa Hansen - (Mark's daughter)

== Music ==
Prior to the film's theatrical release, its original songs were made available online for free, legal download, which attracted wide, positive attention.

== Critical reception ==
Remix was a major film by Martin Hagbjer who had won the 2005 Prize of the Children's Jury at Lübeck Nordic Film Days. Reviews were mixed. Most critics noted a lack of surprise, but praised the fine acting, especially by the film's two leads Camilla Bendix and Micky Skeel Hansen.

Berlingske Tidende's film critic Ebbe Iversen gave the film four stars out of six and called Micky Skeel Hansen "a true star with musicality, attractive looks and a both defiant and vulnerable radiance which gives him the appearance of a new James Dean".
