= Park Road (TV series) =

Danish comedy-drama series

Park Road (orig. Lærkevej) is a Danish comedy-drama-series from 2009, currently with 22 episodes, which is produced by Cosmo Film for TV 2. The series is directed by Kasper Gaardsøe, Mogens Hagedorn and Tilde Harkamp, while the script is written by Mette Heeno, Christian Torpe, Tine Krull Petersen, Anders Frithiof August and Jannik Tai Mosholt. The first episode was shown on September 24, 2009.

It was selected at the Monte-Carlo Television Festival in 2010. The series includes shoots recorded at a former air base.

The title refers to Denmark's most popular street name, occurring in a total of 214 localities.

== Cast ==
Actor	Role
Anette Støvelbæk	Astrid Borg
Henrik Prip	Kim Borg
Laura Drasbæk	Katrine Holm
Christian Tafdrup	Sune Holm
Sarah-Sofie Boussnina	Mathilde Holm
Claus Riis Østergaard	Andreas Norén
Mille Hoffmeyer Lehfeldt	Monica Dam
Søren Spanning	Torben Dahl
Søs Egelind	Elisabeth Sachs
