= Sarah-Sofie Boussnina =

Danish actress (born 1990)

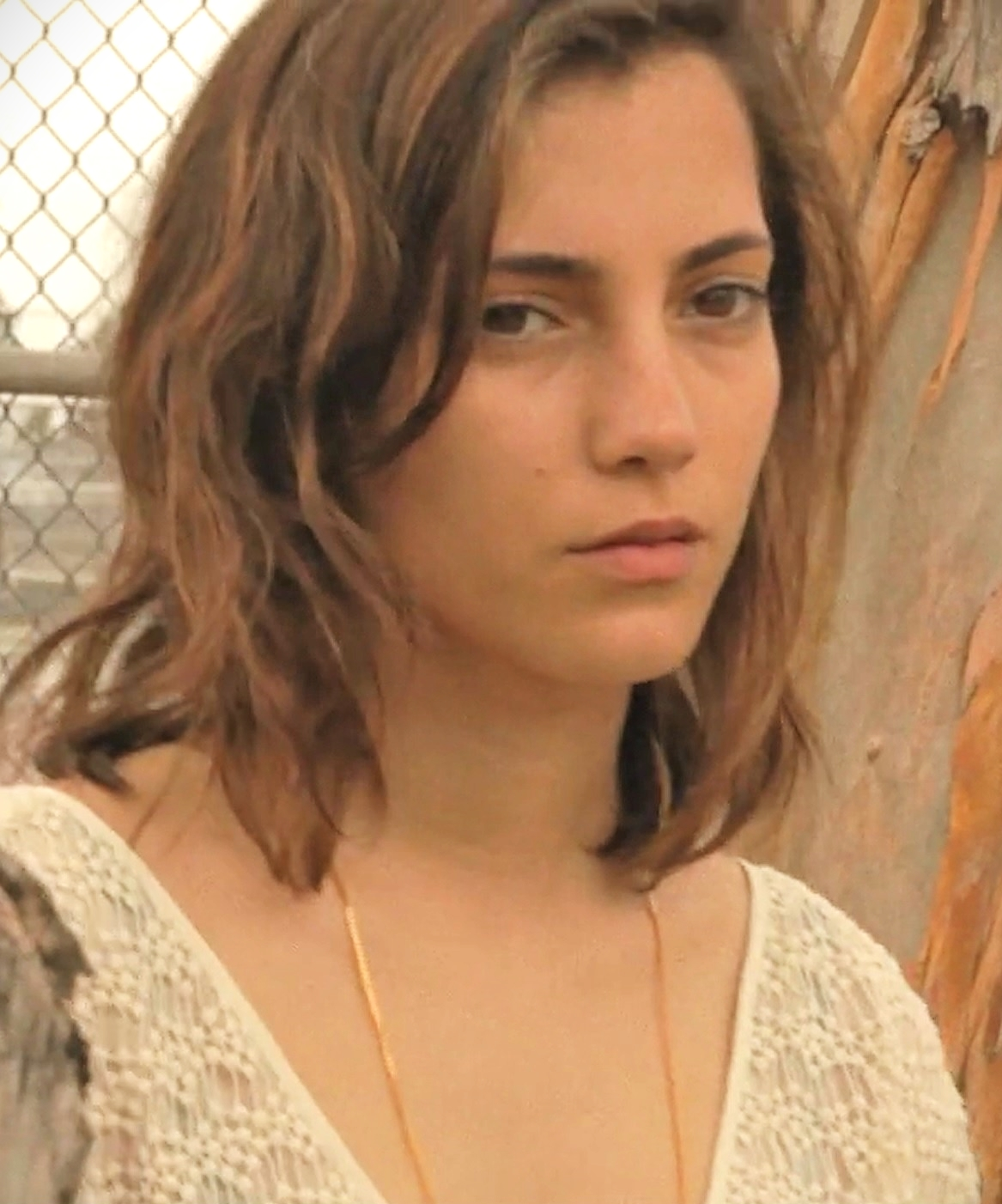
- Boussnina in 2014
- Born: Sarah-Sofie Torp Boussnina; 28 December 1990 (age 35); Svendborg, Denmark
- Occupation: Actress
- Years active: 2008–present
- Spouse: Louis Samson Myhre (m. 2016)

Sarah-Sofie Boussnina (born 28 December 1990) is a Danish actress, best known to international audiences for the TV series The Bridge and 1864 (2014).

== Career ==
In 2018, Boussnina appeared as Martha in Helen Edmundson's film Mary Magdalene.

== Personal life ==
Sarah-Sofie Boussnina was born in Svendborg, Denmark, where she attended Svendborg Gymnasium. She is of Danish and Tunisian ancestry. In May 2016, she married pop singer Louis Samson Myhre, the lead vocalist of Julias Moon.

== Selected filmography ==
- Bora Bora (2011)
- The Absent One (2014)
- Mary Magdalene (2018)
- The Birdcatcher (2019)
- Tides (The Colony) (2021)
- The Way of the Wind (TBA)

== Selected television ==
- Park Road (2009–2010)
- Tvillingerne & Julemanden (2013– )
- 1864 (2014)
- The Bridge (2015)
- Black Lake (2016)
- Knightfall (2017)
- Dune: Prophecy (2024— )
