= Søren Hyldgaard =

Danish composer

Søren Hyldgaard (6 August 1962 – 7 May 2018) was a Danish film composer, also known for several New Age albums and for his concerts.

Hyldgaard was a self-taught musician. As a composer of meditational New Age music, he produced a string of albums with the Scandinavian label Fønix Musik. With more than 125,000 copies sold, Hyldgaard earned both Silver and Platinum Discs for his album Flying Dreams.

Hyldgaard received a prestigious artistic acknowledgement award from the San Diego Film Commission in Southern California for his achievements in film scoring. He also received several European film award nominations, including the Finnish National Film Academy's JUSSI Award as well as the Danish equivalent, the "Robert", for his film score for The One and Only (Den eneste Ene).

His films include the 1997 Oscar-nominated short When Life Departs (Når livet går sin vej). His Hollywood debut came with the 2008 thriller Red, starring Brian Cox.

== Concert music ==
- Concerto for Bass Trombone and Orchestra (2015), written for soloist Stefan Schulz, Berlin Philharmonic Orchestra

== Filmography ==
- Adam Hart i Sahara (1990)
- Enken (1990)
- The Chaplin Puzzle (1992)
- Den sidste færge (1993)
- Mørkets øy (1997)
- Når livet går sin vej (1997)
- Ørnens øje (1997)
- Poika ja ilves (1998)
- Nattens engel (1998)
- Den eneste ene (1999)
- The Other Side (1999)
- Pyrus på pletten (2000)
- Hjælp, jeg er en fisk (2000)
- Edderkoppen (2000)
- Olsen-banden Junior (2001)
- Bertram & Co (2002)
- Ulvepigen Tinke (2002)
- One Hell of a Christmas (2002)
- Till Eulenspiegel (2003)
- Dogville Confessions (2003)
- Midsommer (2003)
- American Short (2004)
- Fakiren fra Bilbao (2004)
- Forsvar (2004)
- Nynne (2005)
- Red (2008)
- Ses (2008)
- Den fremmede / The Stranger (2009)
- Superbror (2009)
- Nuummioq (2009)
- Storm (2009)
- Min søsters børn vælter Nordjylland (2010)
- Noget i luften (2011)
- Live fra Jordens undergang (2012)
- Det grå guld (2013)
