= Mille Dinesen =

Danish actress (born 1974)

- Born: 17 March 1974 (age 52); Copenhagen, Denmark
- Occupation: Actress
- Years active: 2002–present

Mille Dinesen (born 17 March 1974) is a Danish actress best known for starring in the film Nynne (2005), as well as the title role in the television series Rita (2012–2020).

Mille Dinesen completed her acting education at the Danish National School of Performing Arts in 2004.

== Filmography ==
Year	Film	Role	Notes
2005	Nynne	Nynne Larsen	
2006	Uhyret	Mother	Short movie
2006	Clash of Egos	Pernille Jepsen	
2006	Nynne (TV series)	Nynne Larsen	13 episodes
2007	Cecilie	Mette	
2009	Storm	Sofie	
2009	Simon & Malou	Søs	
2010	Bøllebob – Alle tider helt	Miss Friss	
2010	Min søsters børn vælter Nordjylland	Irene Flint	
2011	Those Who Kill (TV series)	Signe	1 episode
2011	Alle for én	Niemeyer's wife	
2011	Borgen (TV series)	Cecilie Toft	6 episodes
2012	Talenttyven	Laura's sister	
2012	Min søsters børn alene hjemme	Irene Flint	
2012–2017; 2020	Rita	Rita Madsen	Main role, 40 episodes
2013	Min søsters børn i Afrika	Irene Flint	
2013	Copenhagen	Effy's mother	Feature film
2016	What We Become	Pernille	

=== Self ===
- Gintbergs store aften – hver aften .... Herself – Actress (1 episode, 2005)

... aka Gintbergs store aften (Denmark: second season title)

  - Episode #2.31 (2005) TV episode .... Herself – Actress
- Go' aften Danmark .... Herself – Actress (1 episode, 2005)
  - Episode dated 27 October 2005 (2005) TV episode .... Herself – Actress
