= We Are the Champions (film) =

2005 Danish comedy film

- Film poster
- Danish: Af banen
- Directed by: Martin Hagbjer
- Written by: Audrey Castañeda; Morten Dragsted
- Produced by: Søren Juul Petersen
- Starring: Lars Bom; Camilla Bendix; Bjarne Henriksen; Claus Bue; Nicolas Bro
- Cinematography: Lars Beyer
- Edited by: Marie-Louise Bordinggaard
- Music by: Martin Hagbjer
- Distributed by: Scanbox
- Release date: 11 March 2005
- Running time: 81 minutes
- Country: Denmark
- Language: Danish

We Are the Champions (Danish: Af banen) is a 2005 Danish independent comedy film directed by Martin Hagbjer.

== Synopsis ==
Torben, an unemployed soccer player, becomes the trainer for a local school soccer team that includes his thirteen-year-old son, David. He now has a chance both to repair his damaged relationship with David and lead the team to victory.

== Cast ==
- Lars Bom as Torben
- Camilla Bendix as Nina
- Bjarne Henriksen as Lennart
- Claus Bue as chairman
- Kristian Halken as Heino
- Niklas Ingemann as David
- Nicolas Bro as Asger
- Anthony Timur Catallar as Mehmet
- Micky Skeel Hansen as Casper
- Saban Özdogan as Hakan
- Nicklas Svale Andersen as Krølle
- Svend Laurits Læssø Larsen as Niclas
- Jonas Sebastian Nielsen as H.C.
- Emilie Fenst as Cecilie
- Susanne Storm as Malene
- Thomas W. Gabrielsson as Simon

== Reception ==
Af banen won the Best Film award at Stockholm Filmfestival Junior.
