= What We Become (film) =

- Danish: Sorgenfri
- Directed by: Bo Mikkelson
- Written by: Bo Mikkelson
- Produced by: Meta Louise Foldager
- Starring: Mille Dinesen; Troels Lyby; Benjamin Engell; Marie Hammer Boda
- Cinematography: Adam Philp
- Edited by: Niels Ostenfeld
- Music by: Martin Pedersen
- Production company: Meta Film
- Release dates: September 21, 2015 (Fantastic Fest); March 31, 2016
- Running time: 80:41 minutes
- Country: Denmark
- Language: Danish

What We Become (Danish: Sorgenfri) is a 2015 Danish horror and zombie movie directed by Bo Mikkelson. It premiered on March 31, 2016. A family unravels during a bloody, berserk summer, when a horrifying plague transforms a small town into the flesh-eating walking dead.

== Plot ==
A family of four - Dino, his wife Pernille and their children, the young Maj and teenager Gustav - are living in idyllic Sorgenfri, Denmark. Pernille dotes on Maj, who in turn dotes on her pet rabbit, Ninus. Another teen, Sonja, moves in with her mother Maria across the street, much to Gustav's interest. At a neighbourhood picnic, one of the residents, Casper, tries to persuade Dino to get a gun so they can go hunting together, but Dino refuses. Meanwhile, some picnickers are seen throwing up. An elderly neighbour, Elna, comes running to the party and says her husband has died, but upon investigation his body has gone missing.

Over the course of several days, a deadly virus that reanimates its hosts into hostile killing machines sweeps the neighbourhood, but Dino lies to the children that everything is alright. Sorgenfri is quarantined by the military, which orders all residents to self-isolate. The military keeps the families supplied, but each house is kept strictly incommunicado and wrapped with plastic sheets, and the power frequently fails. A news report indicates that "more than a month's research into the virus has yielded no results."

During the night, some of the neighbours are dragged from their homes, placed in the back of trucks and transported to a "safe space", as the military tells them. After Gustav checks in on Sonja and sees her tending a wound on her mother's leg, he sneaks out to investigate. He finds that the "safe place" is actually filled with infected, who get fatally shot by the military. He decides to open the back of the trucks to free the patients, and is discovered and flees, not knowing that he has unwittingly freed the infected. The military is quickly overrun and retreats, abandoning everyone to their fate. Sonja and Maria are taken in at Gustav's insistence, against Pernille's protests.

As zombies overrun the neighbourhood, Casper's wife Anna escapes the house and flees in their car. Abandoned, Casper joins Dino and prepares for a siege while Maria grows progressively sicker, and Ninus has gone missing. At breakfast, everyone is eating some kind of meat stew when Maj comes in, asking about Ninus. Dino and Casper explain that rabbits are good runners and Ninus has possibly run away, but the scene implies that the stew that the family is eating is actually Ninus. The infected begin roaming the night, and Anna eventually returns, thoroughly traumatized. Sonja and Gustav have a romantic interlude, and afterwards she returns to her room to sleep with her mother, who dies in the course of the night.

Going scouting, Dino and Casper find the area closed off by a wall erected by the military and are forced back under gunfire. While checking a grocery store for supplies, they come across a woman, who asks if they have seen her missing boyfriend. The store is invaded by zombies; Casper is killed and Dino and the woman flee before they are overrun. Dino then robs the woman of her meagre supplies using Casper's rifle.

While in another romantic interlude, Gustav and Sonja are caught by Pernille, who tells them that Maj is missing, and Gustav and Pernille go outside to look for her. Maj, having snuck out to find Ninus, encounters a zombified Elna, who pounces on Maj and bites her. Her family hears her screams and quickly rush her to safety, killing Elna with a gunshot. The noise attracts a horde, and the family retreats into the house, pursued by the zombies. But meanwhile, Maria has reanimated and infected Anna before Sonja could stop her. When Anna attacks him, Dino shoots her dead.

Dino insists they have to kill Maj before she turns, but Pernille takes her and hides in their bedroom. Dino breaks down the door, but Pernille refuses to let him shoot her daughter. Maj turns into a zombie and kills her mother. Unable to shoot Maj, Dino turns the rifle on himself, only for the gun to click empty. Maj pounces on Dino and kills him.

As the zombies break in, Gustav and Sonja barricade themselves in his room, but find Maria was not actually dead. They finish her off, then use a flare to distract the zombies and succeed in escaping through the forest. The camera then pans outwards over the forest, revealing stems of smoke coming from several places in the town. The sound of an air raid siren can be heard, along with the whistling of a bomb being dropped. At the height of the whistling's crescendo, a deep boom resounds; the screen cuts to black and briefly flashes the words "WHAT WE BECOME", then the end credits begin to roll.

== Cast ==
- Troels Lyby as Dino
- Mille Dinesen as Pernille
- Mikael Birkkjær as Casper
- Marie Hammer Boda as Sonja
- Benjamin Engell as Gustav
- Therese Damsgaard as Anna
- Diana Axelsen as Maria
- Rita Angela as Elna
- Ella Solgaard as Maj

== Release ==
The film was released in four cinemas across Denmark on March 31, 2016, prompting concern from reviewers that the film could flop due to this. However, the film was made available two weeks later via TDC's streaming service.

The film was released in the US on May 13, 2016.

== Reception ==
The film received mixed to positive reviews from critics. Politiken gave the film five out of six of hearts and called it "the best Danish horror movie since Ole Bornedal's Nightwatch", while Ekstra Bladet and Berlingske Tidende both gave four stars. Jyllands-Posten gave three out of six stars, but both BT and Jakob Stegelmann of Danish film magazine Ekko only gave two out of six stars.

On Rotten Tomatoes, the film has an approval rating of 78% based on 9 reviews with an average rating of 6.9/10. On Metacritic, the film has a score of 60 out of 100 based on 7 critics, indicating "mixed or average reviews".
