= The Birdcatcher (film) =

2019 film

The Birdcatcher is a 2019 film directed by British film-maker Ross Clarke and written by Trond Morten Kristensen. Set in Nazi-occupied Norway, supposedly based on a composite of real cases, it concerns Esther, a Jewish girl, who lives disguised as a boy on a Norwegian farm.

Danish actrees Sarah-Sofie Boussnina plays Esther, Jakob Cedergren plays farmer and Norwegian collaborationist Johann. His wife Anna (Laura Birn) is secretly in an affair with a German officer (August Diehl).

== Plot ==
Esther Albertsen’s story begins in a quiet Norwegian town just before the Second World War turns her life upside down. At first, the German soldiers arrive with smiles and reassurances that “things would only get better,” but those promises quickly fade into the sound of gunfire, curfews, and fear. Esther, a young girl practicing for a school play, clings to the words of Lady Macbeth as she repeats, “make thick my blood,” hoping that strength in Shakespeare might help her face the growing tension around her.

Her father, a barber well-liked in the town, brushes off warnings and insists on staying. Eventually, he is arrested without explanation. Her mother tries to fight back but is powerless. Soldiers barge into their home, and Esther learns a hard lesson: “sometimes you have to pretend to survive.”

Separated from her family, Esther is taken in by neighbors. Mrs. Jensen, an elderly woman with a warm heart, offers her shelter and distraction with playing cards and stories. Later, she is moved to the Dalgaard farm, run by Johann, a man cooperating with the German occupiers. There, Esther meets Ola Jensen, a boy her age who brings a little light into her dark world. They share innocent joys like sledding, taking care of animals, and imagining a future in America. Esther even jokes about Ola being a perfect match for a movie star, holding on to fragments of childhood.

But beneath the surface, danger builds. The Dalgaard farm becomes a place where secrets are risky and trust is fragile. Esther hides her Jewish identity, especially after soldiers begin searching homes and arresting people without cause. During one terrifying moment, while pretending to celebrate a local election, she nearly loses her cover. She is forced to cut her hair and dress like a boy to stay safe.

As tension grows at the farm and Johann becomes more unpredictable, Esther and Ola know they can’t stay. On Christmas night, they decide to run, seeking refuge in the neutral Sweden. They make their escape across a frozen lake, walking through bitter cold with only the sound of distant bombers to guide them. “Outside of love, everything else seems to be a waste of time,” Esther reflects, as she and Ola hold on to each other for warmth and hope.

By the time the sun rises, Esther has crossed more than just a physical border. No longer the frightened girl pretending to be strong, she discovers the real strength inside her. “Once upon a time, I became what I pretended to be,” she says, having grown into her own courage through a journey of fear, friendship, and quiet resistance.

== Awards & Festivals ==
- Winner – Best Cinematography & Best Feature, European Cinematography Awards 2019
- Winner – Best International Film, Best Actress Feature Film (Sarah-Sofie Boussnina), Best Supporting Actor (Jakob Cedergren), Best Sound & Best Cinematographer, Garden State Film Festival 2019
- Winner – Best Feature, Hill Country Film Festival 2019
- Nominated – Best Nordic Feature, Santa Barbara International Film Festival 2019
