= Webmaster (film) =

Skyggen
- Directed by: Thomas Borch Nielsen
- Written by: Thomas Borch Nielsen
- Produced by: Søren Juul Petersen
- Starring: Lars Bom; Puk Scharbau; Jørgen Kiil; Karin Rørbeck
- Cinematography: Lars Beyer
- Edited by: Kasper Leick
- Music by: Arne Schultz
- Distributed by: Scanbox (Denmark); Sterling Home Entertainment (US)
- Release date: 1998
- Running time: 97 minutes
- Country: Denmark
- Language: Danish

Webmaster (original title Skyggen, also known as The Shadow) is a 1998 Danish cyberpunk thriller film.

Directed by Thomas Borch Nielsen, it stars Danish actor Lars Bom as the cerebral, machine-like hacker-turned-webmaster J.B., who performs his job while hanging upside down, wearing virtual reality goggles, his mind busy deep inside cyberspace. Upon witnessing a murder, he teams up with the impulsive, energetic Miauv (Puk Scharbau).

The film won a Silver Grand Prize at the 1999 Brussels International Festival of Fantasy Film and a Danish Robert Award for Best Production Design.

Webmaster was financed by the Danish bank Forstædernes Bank; the final production cost was not disclosed by the producers or the director. The film was met with mixed reviews when it was released in Denmark in 1998.
