= Monas verden =

2001 film by Jonas Elmer

- Directed by: Jonas Elmer
- Written by: Nikolaj Peyk, based on a story by Jonas Elmer, in cooperation with web users and the film's actors.
- Produced by: Monica Steenberg
- Starring: Sidse Babett Knudsen, Thomas Bo Larsen
- Cinematography: Morten Søborg
- Edited by: Mette Zeruneith
- Music by: Halfdan E
- Distributed by: Nordisk Film Biografdistribution
- Release date: 7 September 2001
- Running time: 85 minutes
- Country: Denmark
- Language: Danish

Monas verden (eng. Mona's World) is a Danish film from 2001, directed by Jonas Elmer.

The actors could work relatively freely of a script by Nikolaj Peyk. The story was first created by Jonas Elmer with Sidse Babett Knudsen, and given to the actors (12-13 pages). A test filming of the improvisation took place, and was then made into the script by Nikolaj Peyk.

Jonas Elmer also had the idea of creating a website where everybody could write suggestions for the film, such as the actor's lines, the locations, the poster, taglines, logos, and the plot of the film. The website (monasverden.tv2.dk) was put up in 2000.

== Cast ==
- Sidse Babett Knudsen - Mona
- Thomas Bo Larsen - Thorbjørn
- Mads Mikkelsen - Casper
- Klaus Bondam - Don J
- Jesper Asholt - Chefen
- Bjarne Henriksen - Tommy
- Bodil Udsen - Gudrun

== Awards and nominations ==
- 2001 Special Prize in Memoriam R.W. Fassbinder, winner: Jonas Elmer, awarded at the Mannheim-Heidelberg International Filmfestival
- 2002 Robert Award nomination: Best Film - Monica Steenberg (producer)
- 2002 Bodil Award nomination: Best Actress - Sidse Babett Knudsen
