= Switching (film) =

Switching is the first ever Danish interactive film directed by Morten Schjødt, produced by Oncotype and released in 2003. It was financed by, and in cooperation with, the Danish Film Institute, with the support of the "Development Fund of the Ministry of Culture", the MEDIA Programme of the European Union and the DFI Film Workshop. It is distributed by SF Film A/S.

== Introduction ==
Switching is a different type of film that paves the way for new storytelling methods. Switching was specially developed for DVD video. The fascination with interactive expression basically originates in its potential to depict a more fragmented form of reality. The user of this film enters a narrative labyrinth simultaneously unfolding and disrupting the story.

There are three elements that explain why Switching departs from the linear form:

- The film can be changed at any time. Consequently, the user can jump back and forth in time and location.
- The interface and content are not divided; in other words, the screen has no buttons to click - the interface is transparent. The film itself is the clickable object. Accordingly, linear control and logic disappear.
- The narrative is structured around a circular system in which everything repeats itself. So it has no ending. The film continues forever in its circular universe.

== Story ==
Frida and Simon are in a relationship, but something has changed where they must make a decision. They find themselves wishing for change, yet that wish stands in the way of their wish to hold on to the past. The viewer is caught in this moment and through their choices they uniquely determine their own film experience.
