= Regel nr. 1 =

- Directed by: Oliver Ussing
- Written by: Morten Dragsted; Oliver Ussing
- Produced by: Søren Juul Petersen
- Starring: Susanne Juhász; Mira Wanting; Thomas Levin; Nicolas Bro
- Cinematography: Morten Søborg
- Edited by: Nanna Frank Møller
- Music by: Various
- Distributed by: Sandrew Metronome (Denmark)
- Release date: 2003
- Running time: 87 minutes
- Country: Denmark
- Language: Danish

Regel nr. 1 (a.k.a. Rule No. 1) is a 2003 Danish feature film directed by Oliver Ussing. It has a running time of 87 minutes.

This romantic comedy was produced by Zeitgeist in association with Zentropa.

It stars Susanne Juhász as a young single woman, Caroline, who is continually receiving advice from her sister, Sarah (Mira Wanting), with disastrous results. She eventually realises she has to find her own way through life.

It was nominated for three Robert awards (the Danish Oscar):

- Best Actress: Susanne Juhász
- Best Cinematography: Morten Søborg
- Best Supporting Actor: Nicolas Bro

== Sources ==
- Remix at IMDb
