= Nynne =

2005 Danish film directed by Jonas Elder

- Original movie poster
- Directed by: Jonas Elmer
- Written by: Mette Heeno (screenwriter); Book: Henriette Lind; Lotte Thorsen; Anette Vestergaard
- Produced by: Christian E. Christiansen; L ars Feilberg
- Starring: Mille Dinesen
- Cinematography: Niels Reedtz Johansen
- Edited by: My Thordal
- Music by: Søren Hyldgaard
- Distributed by: Angel Scandinavia
- Release date: 28 October 2005
- Running time: 92 minutes
- Country: Denmark
- Language: Danish
- Budget: DKK 14,5 mill. (est.)

Nynne is a Danish film directed by Jonas Elmer, starring Mille Dinesen. It is based on the bestselling Danish novel Nynnes dagbog (en. Nynne's Diary) by Henriette Lind, Lotte Thorsen, and Anette Vestergaard, which itself was based on a popular newspaper column in Politiken. Nynne was the fourth-most seen film total in theaters in Denmark in 2005, with 429,301 tickets sold. (The most seen was Harry Potter and the Goblet of Fire). Dinesen reprised the role in a short series the following year.

== Story ==
The film is about Nynne, who lives in the city. She is single, in her 30s, comforts herself with power shopping, has unsuccessful dates, loves to gossip with her friends, and has a hangover every weekend.

== Cast ==
- Mille Dinesen as Nynne
- Lars Kaalund as Martin
- Jimmi Jørgensen as Daniel
- Mette Agnete Horn as Merete
- Stine Stengade as Natasha
- Claes Bang as Henrik
- Lene Maria Christensen as Beate
- Ole Lemmeke as Poul Erik Ø
- Lars Hjortshøj as Hans
- Anne-Lise Gabold as Henriks mor
- Asta Esper Hagen Andersen as Henriks mormor
- Tatiana Pajkovic as Fiona
- Laura Christensen as Fiona's friend
- Martin Kongstad as domestic worker
- Lærke Winther Andersen as sales assistant
- Christian Tafdrup as guy at restaurant

== Soundtrack ==
The movie's soundtrack was composed by Søren Hyldgaard.

CD track list

1. Clark Anderson – "Real Love"
2. Terri Walker – "Ain’t No Love"
3. Alex – "Os To!"
4. Johnny Deluxe – "Det Du Gør"
5. Bryan Rice – "No Promises"
6. Søs Fenger – "Lykken Vender" (Nynnes Mantra)
7. Eddie Holman – "Hey There Lonely Girl"
8. Remee Allstars – "My Way"
9. Pelding Feat. Joy Morgan – "Little Girl Blue"
10. Brinck – "It's My Life"
11. Beverley Knight – "Keep This Fire Burning"
12. New Originals Feat. Mibb & Michael Carøe – "Superstar"
13. Sisse Marie – "Boom"
14. Terri Walker – "Whoopsie Daisy Hit’n Run"

Songs in the movie, not listed on the soundtrack CD, include:

- Billie Holiday – "The Man I Love"
- Shirley Bassey – "Big Spender"
- Bing Crosby – "Here Comes Santa Claus"
- Brigitte Bardot – "Ne Me Laisse Pas L'aimer"
