= The Candidate (2008 film) =

- Film poster
- Danish: Kandidaten
- Directed by: Kasper Barfoed
- Written by: Stefan Jaworski
- Produced by: Jonas Allen; Peter Bose
- Starring: Nikolaj Lie Kaas; Ulf Pilgaard; Laura Christensen; Tuva Novotny; David Dencik
- Edited by: Peter Brandt; Adam Nielsen
- Music by: Jeppe Kaas
- Distributed by: SF Film (Denmark)
- Release date: August 2008
- Running time: 90 minutes
- Country: Denmark
- Language: Danish

The Candidate is a 2008 Danish film, the first shot in the 2-perf format. Its original Danish title is Kandidaten. The film tells the story of Jonas Bechmann who believes the car accident that killed his father was no accident. When he goes in search of the facts behind his father's death, he finds himself set up for murder.

== Plot ==
Advocate Jonas Bechmann is going through a crisis. It has been one year since his father died in a car crash. Although the police have not pursued the case, Jonas believes it was, in fact, murder, connected to the last case his father worked on. To investigate the murder, Jonas quits his job and applies for the post at the law firm his father left open when he died. He is denied the job but told by his father's old partner, Martin Schiller, that evidence has been found his father took a bribe to make evidence disappear that incriminated his last client, Claes Kiehlert. Furthermore, Martin implies that Jonas' father was killed because the evidence turned up in court after all.

Devastated Jonas indulges in a wild night on the town. He wakes the next morning in a hotel room, having only vague memories of having cheated on his fiancée, Camilla. When he enters the bathroom, he finds last night's girl dead on the floor, her throat heavily bruised. He hides the evidence of ever having been there and goes home to find an anonymous envelope waiting for him. It contains a DVD with incriminating footage of him making love to the girl and her being strangled to death. Furthermore, the message states a sum - 5,000,000 Danish Krone - a date and a place.

When Jonas goes to the place of delivery with the money (everything he owns), he hands over the payoff to the wrong person, an incidental passerby walking his Great Dane, who takes off without a word. Next, two masked men arrive demanding that he deliver the same sum of money the next day at the same spot. To put further pressure on Jonas the tape will be delivered to Camilla. The police will be next, the blackmailers warn him.

Having nowhere left to turn to, Jonas retraces his steps of that fateful night, hoping he will find some clue to the identity of his blackmailers. During his search he sights the girl he has allegedly killed, being alive and healthy. She only just gets away from Jonas when two police men tackle him. Still, he manages to track her down. She tells him she is a call girl having been hired to set him up. She gives him the slip and jumps into a car blocking Jonas' in the road. Just before the car takes off an item of clothing belonging to his fiancée is thrown from its window.

Afraid for Camilla's life, Jonas rushes to the summer house where she is residing. There he finds her bound to a chair with a black sack over her head. Before he can free her, the two masked men arrive on the vicinity, threatening to kill Camilla if Jonas doesn't hand over the money. In the subsequent struggle he manages to shoot them both with their own weapons, but only after Camilla has been killed.
However, taking the sack off the woman's head face reveals she is not Jonas' fiancée, but the call girl. The two men turn out to be the policemen who interfered in his chasing her. Martin Schiller arrives on the scene, having been called by a worried Camilla, who is safe at home. He offers Jonas to clean up the mess and urges him to go home.

Jonas does so, but, after a talk with Camilla, makes up his mind to turn himself in. The next day he goes to Martin's house to inform the man of his decision. Just as he is about to ring the bell, a Great Dane shows itself. It is the dog of the man who took off with Jonas' 5 million krone. He follows it to a shed in Martin's yard. In it he discovers not only the two so-called policemen and the call girl - the three of them very much alive - but also the walls to be covered with detailed planning for a large scam: the one he has been led through in the last past days. What's more, among the items in the room he notices his father's old cell phone.

Infuriated, Jonas grabs the phone and a gun and runs back to Martin's house, just in time to see the man drive off in his car. After a bumper to bumper race, in which he tries to push Martin off the road, Jonas faces him. At gunpoint Martin confesses to the murder on Jonas' father. When the concealed evidence turned up in court again, he feared retribution by Kiehlert associates. Martin holds that he has done no more than Jonas has done in the past few days: concealing evidence of a crime and killing in order to protect himself. He then offers Jonas a dream position at his law firm. Grudgingly Jonas accepts.

In the last scene Jonas is seen signing his new contract in the presence of Martin and the director of the law firm. Jonas thanks Martin and plays a recording which he has taped on his father's phone. It is Martin's confession of the murder.

== Cast and characters ==
- Nikolaj Lie Kaas as Jonas Bechmann
- Ulf Pilgaard as Martin Schiller
- Laura Christensen as Louise
- Tuva Novotny as Camilla
- David Dencik as Michael
- Kim Bodnia as Claes Kiehlert
- Henning Jensen as Peter Bechmann
- Jesper Langberg as Jørgen Hammel
- Birgitte Hjort Sørensen as Sarah
- Henning Valin Jakobsen as Blackmailer 1
- Claus Riis Østergaard as Blackmailer 2
- Peter Plaugborg as Thin man
- Henrik Prip as Henrik Linde
- Marijana Jankovic as Kathrine Malling
- Iben Dorner as Schiller's assistant (as Iben Amelieh Emine Dorner)
- Jakob Ulrik Lohmann as Traffic officer
- Camille-Catrine Rommedahl as Schiller's receptionist (as Camille Rommedahl)
- Per Scheel Krüger as TV journalist
- Christian Mortensen as Server
- Anna Eline Levin as Freya
- Ditte Hoffman Lessner as Marius Mor
- Marius S. Stands as Marius
- Stanislav Sevcik as Matthias Böttker
- David Rousing as Jimmy Lessner
- Ann Hjort as Eva Schiller
- Christoffer Boe as Man in front of restaurant

== Awards ==
Award	Category	Recipients	Won
Robert Award	Best Original Score (Årets score (musik))	Jeppe Kaas	Yes
Robert Award	Best Special Effects (Årets special effects)	Thomas Dyg	No
