= Anette Støvelbæk =

Danish actress

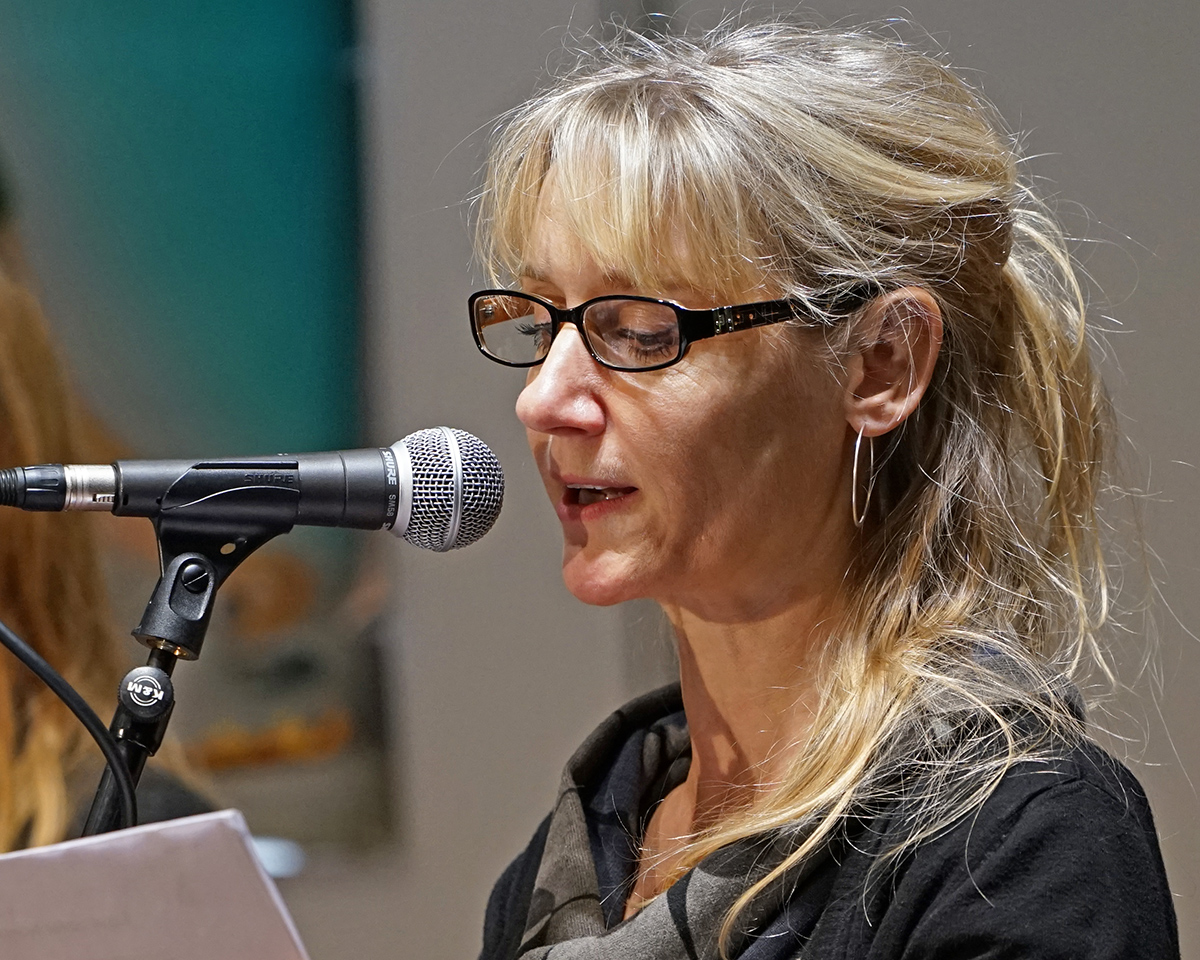
- Støvelbæk in 2015
- Born: 27 July 1967 (age 58); Amager, Denmark
- Years active: 2000–present
- Spouse: Lars Mikkelsen (m. 1989)
- Children: 2

Anette Støvelbæk (born 27 July 1967) is a Danish actress. She was born in Copenhagen and is married to actor Lars Mikkelsen.

She made her screen debut as Olympia in the Danish comedy film Italian for Beginners (2000).

== Selected filmography ==
Year	Title	Role	Notes
2018–2020	The New Nurses	Ruth Madsen	TV-series
2014	Itsi Bitsi		
2013–2022	Seaside Hotel	Alice Frigh	TV-series
2009–10	Welcome to Park Road	Astrid Borg	TV-series
2008	Remix		
2003	Someone like Hodder		
2000	The Bench		
2000	Italian for Beginners	Olympia	
