= Rejseholdet =

Danish television crime drama series (2000–2004)

- Danish 'Complete Box Set' DVD cover
- Also known as: Unit One
- Genre: Crime drama
- Created by: Peter Thorsboe; Rumle Hammerich
- Starring: Charlotte Fich; Mads Mikkelsen; Lars Brygmann; Waage Sandø; Erik Wedersøe; Trine Pallesen; Lars Bom; Michael Falch
- Composer: Jacob Groth
- Country of origin: Denmark
- Original language: Danish
- No. of series: 4
- No. of episodes: 32

Production
- Executive producer: Sven Clausen
- Producers: Anne-Marie Vidkjær; Emilie Steen
- Cinematography: Lars Vestergaard
- Editor: Gerd Tjur
- Running time: 60 minutes

Original release
- Network: DR1
- Release: 1 October 2000 – 1 January 2004

Rejseholdet (lit. 'The Travel Team', international title: Unit One) is a Danish television crime drama series, broadcast on DR1, that ran for four series from 1 October 2000 to 1 January 2004. The series starred Charlotte Fich as DCI Ingrid Dahl, an ambitious detective who is promoted to the role of unit commander seemingly on the basis of being female. Mads Mikkelsen and Lars Brygmann co-starred as Sergeants Allan Fischer and Thomas La Cour. It was created by Peter Thorsboe and Rumle Hammerich, and won several awards, including an Emmy.

== Synopsis ==
The series revolves around an elite mobile police task force that travel around Denmark, assisting each local police force solve serious crimes. The format of each episode balances the forensic process and an unfolding backstory that includes the somewhat ambivalent relationships existing between the unit members and their families. The series regularly touches on social issues including the insularity of police work, the social and emotional impact of brutal crime, as well as political and press involvement in the justice process.

Each episode is titled with a reference to an assistancemelding, which roughly translates into English as "Request for Assistance". Each case portrayed in the show was loosely based upon actual sensational crimes such as murders, kidnappings, cross-border sex trafficking and child pornography.

== Cast ==
- Charlotte Fich as DCI Ingrid Dahl; commander of the unit. Single mother of Tobias (by former husband) and guardian of Gry, the daughter of her late partner. Promoted to a leadership position, she initially struggles to gain the respect of the team and her superior, Ulf Thomson. During the series Ingrid suspect that Ulf is her father. Her suspicion is eventually revealed to be true.
- Mads Mikkelsen as DS Allan Fischer; the "problem child" of the unit. Impulsive and emotional, Fischer has been frustrated by a lack of advancement, as he is seen by Ulf and Ingrid as "difficult to manage". Despite his rough edges his persistence, physicality and willingness to bend the rules often produces results and he is thus highly valued as a member of the team.
- Lars Brygmann as DS Thomas La Cour; the most cerebral member of the unit. La Cour is noteworthy for his highly intuitive investigative approach that often plays a key role in solving a mystery. Most episodes include a sequence where La Cour seems to mystically "channel" the victim and/or perpetrator in order to re-create the crime event. The portrayal of these moments sometimes suggest the supernatural, such as an episode when an off-duty La Cour leads local police directly to the murder scene and thus places himself under suspicion for the crime.
- Waage Sandø as DI Jens Peter "I.P." Jørgensen; the senior member of the unit. I.P. was passed over for promotion when Ingrid was appointed commander. Partner to Kirsten. A world-weary but trusted and quietly supportive second-in-command to Ingrid. Has been with the force for 40 years.
- Erik Wedersøe as Commander Ulf Thomsen; a senior police official, under whom the unit operates. Appointed Ingrid as commander of the unit. The promotion seems at least partially the product of political pressure to elevate a female. Ulf frequently challenges Ingrid's decisions but his respect for her is revealed over time. Ulf's affair with Kirsten and promotion of Ingrid has complicated his longstanding relationship with colleague I.P.
- Trine Pallesen as DC Gaby Levin; a junior member of the unit. Develops relationship with Johnny Olsen. Gaby is portrayed as the "glue that often holds the unit together", managing unit logistics, and she is heavily relied upon by Ingrid and other unit members.
- Lars Bom as Johnny Olsen; a contract truck owner/operator. Responsible for moving the Rejseholdet mobile office between locations. Partner of Gaby. Former Danish national football (soccer) star, frequently "unofficially" involved in the unit's police work.
- Michael Falch as Jan Boysen; a forensic pathologist working with the Danish Police who pursues Ingrid romantically.
- Sebastian Ottensten as Tobias; Ingrid's teenage son. Tobias's brushes with the law (smoking hashish and joyriding in a stolen car) have been used to illustrate Ingrid's conflicted state as an ambitious career officer and a single mother.
- Lisbet Lundquist as Kirsten Jørgensen, a successful stage actress and I.P.'s partner during the first season. Kirsten struggles with issues pertaining to ageing and alcoholism, and later develops an affair with Ulf.
- Lykke Sand Michelsen as Gry; daughter of Ingrid's late partner.
- Benedikte Hansen as Trine Dalgaard

== Production ==
The series was produced by produced by Danmarks Radio. It predominantly filmed at TV-Drama's film studio at TV-byen in Søborg, Denmark, as well as on location. Filming also took place in Sweden, Germany, Iceland, and other close regional countries.

The series was created by Peter Thorsboe and Rumle Hammerich, and largely written by husband and wife writing duo Mai Brostrøm and Peter Thorsboe. The pair have written several successful series, including The Eagle, and The Protectors, winning three Emmy Awards. In 2023 they created the series Oxen.

== Broadcast ==
A total of 32 episodes aired across four series. It was broadcast in Denmark (DR1), Sweden (TV4), Iceland (Rúv), Germany (ZDF), Australia (SBS), Croatia (HRT3), and the United States (MHz).

In the Netherlands, the entire series was released as "Unit One" with Dutch subtitles. In the United Kingdom, each series was released individually as per the original broadcast. The releases form part of Arrow Films' Nordic Noir strand of releases. The first series was released on 21 January 2013. The second series followed on 27 May 2013. The third series was released on 6 January 2014, followed by the fourth and final series on 7 July 2014.

The complete series is also available on DVD. In the US and Australia, three individual sets comprising all thirty-two episodes were released on DVD in 2014. These contain purely English subtitles. In Europe, the Scandinavian release, which contains all thirty-two episodes in one box set, includes subtitles in Danish, English, Norwegian and Swedish.

== Accolades ==
In 2002, the series received the Emmy Award for Best Drama Series from the International Academy of Television Arts and Sciences.

The series also won the Best Drama Award at the annual Danish Television Awards in both 2001 and 2002.

For his leading role, Mads Mikkelsen received the Best Actor award at the 2002 Danish Television Awards.

== Episodes ==
=== Series 1 (2000) ===
No. overall	No. in series	Title	Directed by	Written by	Original release date	TNS Gallup viewers (million)
1	1	"Assistancemelding A-15/99"	Niels Arden Oplev	Stig Thorsboe & Peter Thorsboe	1 October 2000	1.24
Chief of Investigation of Unit One, Torben Rønne, is found murdered in his house along with Henning Ravn, a friend of his who was temporarily living at Torben's. Ingrid Dahl is promoted to temporary Chief of Investigation to support Unit One. Because of information provided by a criminal, Unit One locates Dennis Friis, the son of a woman Ravn used to date years back. As Friis tries to pick up the murder weapon, he is discovered by Fischer and La Cour and taken into custody. He confesses the crime under questioning with Dahl.
2	2	"Assistancemelding A-21/99 (Part 1)"	Niels Arden Oplev	Peter Thorsboe	8 October 2000	1.21
The deceased, a pub owner from Horsens and an old acquaintance of the police, was discovered after being liquidated. He also has outstanding business with the local bikers. But Ingrid thinks the motive for the homicide is more of a personal nature. The larger mobile office is put to use for the first time and its driver proves to be a surprise. Just as the investigation gets underway Ingrid receives a phone call that forces her to rush back to Copenhagen.
3	3	"Assistancemelding A-21/99 (Part 2)"	Niels Arden Oplev	Iben Gylling & Peter Thorsboe	15 October 2000	1.21
Fischer and La Cour find Grue, the biker president, who is carrying a sawn-off shotgun around which resembles the murder weapon from their case. But the revelation that follows is not what they expected. Ingrid Returns with a plan that conflicts with Chief Constable Ulf Thomsen. Fischer receives unexpected help when he gets into a fight with a couple of suspects. La Cour finds a vital clue and IP suspects something going on between Gaby and Johnny Olsen.
4	4	"Assistancemelding A-6/00"	Jørn Faurschou	Flemming Jarlskov & Peter Thorsboe	22 October 2000	1.23
When an elderly lady is murdered in Nakskov, details emerge from her younger female lodger, who says she saw an unfamiliar man leave the house just after the crime. Fischer's relationship with the local force is complicated because of a previous case and the conflict between them resurfaces. IP is worried about Kirsten's whereabouts, and Ingrid's husband Søren surprises her just as she is on her way out with Boysen.
5	5	"Assistancemelding A-11/00"	Jørn Faurschou	Iben Gylling & Peter Thorsboe	29 October 2000	1.51
A young couple's wedding day is ruined by a murder. The killing seems unfeasible and the forensics experts are perplexed when Unit One arrives. Soon, many of the villagers are under suspicion. While IP's jealously grows, Johnny receives help from Gaby with his personal problems. Søren puts pressure on Ingrid to make a decision about their relationship. But all could be futile when Ingrid soon after receives a phone call from the hospital alerting her that Søren is in a serious condition.
6	6	"Assistancemelding A-15/00"	Peter Flinth	Dunja Gry Jensen	5 November 2000	1.52
Ulla, a teacher from Roskilde, has celebrated her 30th birthday with a big party among friends and relatives. On her way home from the party she disappears without a trace. Her husband calls the police and Unit One is summoned. Evidence indicates that a crime has taken place, and Ulla's children also face danger. Ingrid is in an awful state following Søren's death and has incarcerated herself. Gaby and Johnny try to help, but in vain. However, IP has his own way of tackling Ingrid. Fischer receives a tempting offer from Ulf.
7	7	"Assistancemelding A-17/00"	Peter Flinth	Nikolaj Scherfig	12 November 2000	1.57
Fischer and La Cour have taken a holiday on the North Sea with Fischer's family. Their holiday is soon ruined when the local force receives an anonymous tip-off that a homicide has been committed in the neighborhood. The murderer is at large and could strike again at any time. Ulf is summoned when Fischer loses control while detaining a subject.
8	8	"Assistancemelding A-19/00 (Part 1)"	Charlotte Sieling	Nikolaj Scherfig & Peter Thorsboe	19 November 2000	1.49
A whole town is in fear because a masked man has been assaulting elderly women who live on their own. The assaults are becoming increasingly violent and everyone is afraid that the next one will be fatal. Unit One is called in and La Cour is forced into dealing with a painful encounter from his past. IP is having a hard time with Kirsten and receives a flattering invitation, while Fischer acquires insight into Johnny's love life.
9	9	"Assistancemelding A-19/00 (Part 2)"	Charlotte Sieling	Peter Thorsboe	26 November 2000	1.64
The disguised man who attacks elderly women strikes again. But he is constantly one step ahead of the police, who are at a loss. Ulf arrives and demands a result, and is confronted by IP. Fischer tries to provoke La Cour into resuming his relationship with Helene. La Cour finds the vital clue, but is he in time? Johnny is an involuntary witness as the case comes to a head.

=== Series 2 (2001) ===
No. overall	No. in series	Title	Directed by	Written by	Original release date	TNS Gallup viewers (million)
10	1	"Assistancemelding A-24/00"	Jørn Faurschou	Iben Gylling & Peter Thorsboe	11 March 2001	1.60
A young boy is kidnapped on his 9th birthday. The team discovers him alive and well, but getting him back to his mother is not simple. Ulf and Kirsten take a trip to London.
11	2	"Assistancemelding A-25/00"	Jannik Johansen	Mikael Olsen	18 March 2001	1.68
A lawyer with a history of getting defendants to retract confessions uses the technique to exonerate the perpetrator of a crime that the team previously investigated. Then the lawyer and his family are threatened by an unknown attacker and the team is called in to protect him.
12	3	"Assistancemelding A-26/00"	Martin Schmidt	Ola Saltin, Stig Thorsboe & Peter Thorsboe	25 March 2001	1.56
The owner of a chocolate factory is found murdered. Did his murder have something to do with his appetite for young women and kinky sex, or is there something else at play?
13	4	"Assistancemelding A-28/00"	Martin Schmidt	Mai Brostrøm & Peter Thorsboe	1 April 2001	1.61
A woman dies in a house fire. Her 8-year-old daughter fights for her life in hospital. Was the fire an accident or arson?
14	5	"Assistancemelding A-30/00"	Jørn Faurschou	Mai Brostrøm, Iben Gylling & Peter Thorsboe	8 April 2001	1.54
Local police overhears a shooting. A teenage girl comes running against them yelling "They're gonna kill me, they're gonna kill me!". The female police officer finds the body of Irana and Fashad Adavi in the apartment of Osman and Leyla Gür. The reason for the murder is believed to be a matter of honour according to Osman, as he explains that Fashad supposedly had raped Yasemin, the daughter of Osman and Leyla. The son, Dennis, supposedly shot Fashad as he refused to marry Yasemin. In questioning, Dennis fails to reload the pistol and is therefore not the murderer. Yasemin then claims she shot the victims. In a gynaecological examination, Yasemin proves to be a virgin. As the gynaecologist talks with Dahl, Yasemin escapes and, according to her teacher, hides in a botanical facility. The teacher explains that Osman has sexually abused his daughter anally for years. IP finds the girl in time, as her father is trying to kill her with a piece of glass. In questioning, Yasemin explains that she had told Irana about her father, who then tried to convince Osman to let the kids get married, resulting in Osman killing both Irana and Fashad and attempting to then kill Yasemin as well.
15	6	"Assistancemelding A-31/00 (Part 1)"	Jørn Faurschou	Stig Thorsboe & Peter Thorsboe	15 April 2001	1.42
The body of the 10-year-old is found in a stream in the woods just outside Hellebæk. No boy of the description is missing. La Cour dreams of a bag that is found at the harbour and has exactly the same interior as in La Cours dream. A social licence from the bag reveals the boy to be Martin Simonsen. DNA samples proves that the killer earlier has murdered a young boy. La Cour talks with a conductor from Odense, Claus Munk Andersen, who claims he didn't see the boy. But through a vision and investigation of other witnesses, Andersen is taken into custody. A DNA sample proves him to be the killer, but when the police moves out to arrest him, they find him hanged in his house and La Cour's fingerprints all over the place.
16	7	"Assistancemelding A-31/00 (Part 2)"	Jørn Faurschou	Mai Brostrøm & Peter Thorsboe	22 April 2001	1.71
La Cour is taken into custody and is ordered home to Copenhagen. In the meantime, the investigation team contacts Karin, the sister of Andersen who tells them that the man that visited Andersen the night he was killed and had sexual intercourse with him probably is Sonny, a local male prostitute. Fischer is sent to the dumpster, where he finds a trash bag that contains Andersen's diary containing information about the murdered boys and Cliff "Sonny" Jensen, whom Andersen raised into prostitution and lent to his friends. La Cour notices some cigarette butts and remembers what happened at Andersen's, paying Ulrik Gregersen, Andersen's brother-in-law a visit. He follows him to the dumpster where he arrests him and discovers that the trash bags he dumped there contained the body of Sonny.

=== Series 3 (2001-2002) ===
No. overall	No. in series	Title	Directed by	Written by	Original release date	TNS Gallup viewers (million)
17	1	"Assistancemelding A-2/01"	Charlotte Sieling	Mai Brostrøm, Ola Saltin & Peter Thorsboe	30 December 2001	1.75
A psychology student meets up with one of her regular chat friends. After she disappears it takes six months before Unit One is on the case.
18	2	"Assistancemelding A-3/01"	Charlotte Sieling	Mai Brostrøm & Peter Thorsboe	6 January 2002	1.88
Christian and Andreas Dahl are shot when they confront two famous criminals in burying stolen money in Kalundborg. Tina Lauritsen, the wife of Christian, is later found with her throat slit. The criminals are quickly identified, as a burned out white Mercedes is found containing rabbit dung (as Eik Nielsen, the male criminal, favours white Mercedes and Anja Jespersen, the female criminal, always carry around a rabbit). Unit One puts the area where the money was buried under surveillance. When the couple shows up, the Special Police Corps surround them, but they manage to escape into the church where a small group of people were arranging baptising schedules. Eik lets the grown ups escape and the priest, the wife of a local police officer, manages to text message Unit One and ask them to open the Northern Door to let Anja escape with the infant. The Special Police Corps manages to successfully rescue the priest and take Eik into custody.
19	3	"Assistancemelding A-4/01"	Jørn Faurschou	Peter Thorsboe & Kari Vidø	13 January 2002	1.88
Unit One is called to Aabenrå when parts of a female human body is found in Knapsø. As Unit One checks the German Missing List, a witness tells of a silver Audi from where a man tossed a trashbag into the harbour, and of a burning container filled with personal files on a Doris Fröse. The owner of the silver Audi, Manfred Schlosser, lacks any information. A summerhouse owner contacts them and tells that the sheets and beddings have been replaced and the floor scrubbed very thoroughly. Blood samples confirms the victim to be Doris Fröse, but the name of the man who borrowed the summerhouse is fake. A friend of Doris Fröse confirms that the man whom Doris Fröse was visiting in Denmark was Manfred Schlosser. In the meantime, Pernille, the wife of Manfred Schlosser, finds knives and photoalbums of many murdered women in the attic. Manfred finds out and drowns her in their bathtub. Manfred is taken into custody, but denies everything.
20	4	"Assistancemelding A-6/01"	Jørn Faurschou	Mai Brostrøm & Peter Thorsboe	20 January 2002	2.02
A hotel is set on fire in Nyborg, killing 32 people. A local pyromaniac, Henning Jørgensen, is taken into questioning, but fails to answer where the fire started. In a side story, a little boy witnesses how a bespectacled man places the corpse of a young woman on a bench in a parking lot. In a picture from the local newspaper, a face is very faintly viewed in the background, and the police trace the person in the picture to be Otto Lykke Larsen, a intellectually disabled man. Larsen is taken into questioning. In the videos found in Larsen's apartment, fires are videotaped and Unit One suspects that Larsen was the pyromaniac responsible. In other videos, Larsen has sexual intercourse with a woman, Britt Hjort Jespersen. In questioning, Larsen admits that he was the one who set fire on the hotel, along with all the other fires recorded in his videotapes. In the meantime, the corpse of the young woman is identified as Jespersen. Larsen admits he killed Jespersen.
21	5	"Assistancemelding A-7/01 (Part 1)"	Martin Schmidt	Mai Brostrøm & Peter Thorsboe	27 January 2002	1.96
Just released from prison the entrepreneur called farmand (daddy-o) is found murdered in a Danish train to Århus, which puts the unit smack in the middle of hypnosis and crime and they meet one of the smartest criminals in the series so far. Kaare commits a robbery just after being released from State Prison in Horsens. He shoots three people and is arrested by Fischer. Unit One suspects that Ivan has masterminded the coup.
22	6	"Assistancemelding A-7/01 (Part 2)"	Martin Schmidt	Peter Thorsboe & Kari Vidø	3 February 2002	1.82
The tragic case of Kaare and Ivan continues, who will break first the police or Ivan?
23	7	"Assistancemelding A-9/01"	Charlotte Sieling	Mai Brostrøm & Peter Thorsboe	10 February 2002	1.79
Bertel Kjeldsen calls Dahl late at night to ask her to come to Fredensborg where he allegedly killed his own wife. In the meantime, the case of Britt Hjort Jespersen is brought up again as a poor autopsy of the body wasn't satisfactory. DNA samples from a new autopsy show DNA from another man. Dahl tries hard to find Keldsen, who is standing at the edge of a tall building when Dahl finds him. He tells how he killed his wife and how his son, Knud Kjeldsen, killed Jespersen. Dahl arrests Knud. Knud lies under questioning, but the DNA samples show that Knud's biological brother, Robin Hansen, who is intellectually disabled, was the murderer. Knud tried to cover for his retarded brother to spare his family.
24	8	"Assistancemelding A-12/01"	Charlotte Sieling	Peter Thorsboe & Kari Vidø	17 February 2002	1.89
When local crime boss Bob is found murdered in his own S&M dungeon in a custom made monkey cage in Fredericia, the unit is involved in a case of revenge and jealousy.

=== Series 4 (2002-2003) ===
No. overall	No. in series	Title	Directed by	Written by	Original release date	TNS Gallup viewers (million)
25	1	"Assistancemelding A-13/01"	Ole Christian Madsen	Mai Brostrøm & Peter Thorsboe	24 February 2002	2.07
An entire family is brutally murdered and the case leads the unit into a tragic story of incest and violence.
26	2	"Assistancemelding A-15/01"	Ole Christian Madsen	Peter Thorsboe & Kari Vidø	3 March 2002	2.13
Jette Møller is found murdered in a fish boutique in Vordingborg. Finn Møller, her husband, is taken into custody, but nothing is gaining out of his answers. His phone is tapped and when a suspicious phone call remind Fischer and La Cour about Strangers on a Train, Møller is put under surveillance. He escapes when he sails from Vordingborg to an island. The following day, the body of Putte Bech Lorentzen is found in a sauna. Unit One suspects Larsen and arrests him. Through evidence found in the garden of Bech Lorentzen, Unit One arrests Bertram Bech Lorentzen, the husband of Putte, for the murder of Jette.
27	3	"Assistancemelding A-16/01"	Jannik Johansen	Mai Brostrøm & Peter Thorsboe	10 March 2002	2.15
A young girl is found murdered on Bornholm and the unit is quickly involved as it looks like the work of one of Denmark's infamous serial killers, known as The Indian; unfortunately, the story spins into a personal tragedy for Ingrid.
28	4	"Assistancemelding A-17/01"	Jannik Johansen	Peter Thorsboe & Kari Vidø	17 March 2002	2.22
When Johnny finds a couple of Lithuanian girls in the back of a truck near Slagelse the unit is getting involved in a case of human trafficking and quickly ties it to the Lithuanian mafia.
29	5	"Assistancemelding A-19/01 (Part 1)"	Charlotte Sieling	Mai Brostrøm & Peter Thorsboe	24 March 2002	1.98
La Cour gets one of his visions and finds a murdered student at one of the most prestigious boarding schools in Denmark, this involves the unit in a case where they finally get clues to find the serial killer known as The Indian (because he cuts the pubes off his victims); meanwhile, Ulf has bad news for the team.
30	6	"Assistancemelding A-19/01 (Part 2)"	Charlotte Sieling	Mai Brostrøm & Peter Thorsboe	1 April 2002	2.19
The Indian has kidnapped Gaby, and La Cour and Fischer are on their tail, IP is trying to protect The Indian's ex-girlfriend who is also the murdered student's sister.
31	7	"Assistancemelding A-05/03 (Part 1)"	Ole Christian Madsen	Mai Brostrøm & Peter Thorsboe	25 December 2003	1.79
When a black prostitute is found murdered and things indicate the Danish minister of justice, the unit is once again called together, although they are all busy with other work; soon we learn that things are not what they seem and we venture into the Danish biker scene.
32	8	"Assistancemelding A-05/03 (Part 2)"	Ole Christian Madsen	Mai Brostrøm & Peter Thorsboe	1 January 2004	2.19
Things are taking a turn for the worse when both Johnny and Fischer find themselves in grave danger; their cover has been blown and the bikers want them dead.
