= Puls (band) =

Danish musical band

PULS
- Origin: Denmark
- Genres: Pop
- Years active: 2010–present
- Members: Micky (Micky Skeel Hansen); Niel (Niels Kristian Baarsby)
- Website: www.pulslifestyle.com

Puls stylised as PULS (Danish pronunciation: [pʰuls]) are a Danish musical band specializing in pop, dance and club music made up of Micky (full name Micky Skeel Hansen) and Niel (full name Niels Kristian Baarsby) and are signed to PhatPhase label.

Micky (born 23 December 1988 in Køge) and Neil (born in Høje Taastrup) met through online music network www.mymusic.dk where they had posted their own materials. Mickey Skeel Hansen was already an active Danish actor who had appeared on Snurre Snups Søndagsklub on Danish TV 2 channel in 2005. He had also appeared in a number of films including Familien Gregersen, Af banen and Dommeren (in 2004–2005), in TV series Sommer in 2008 and in Remix, a film about music industry's relationship to child stars.

Mickey and Neil invested in studio equipment, and loaded more than 80 songs. The first commercial release was "Superstar", produced by Jacob "J.R." Simonsen also known as Lil'Jay of Apollon accompanied by a music video of the song by Blue Sky Music. It did quite well in dancing circuits with Simonsen becoming PULS' producer.

PULS had their official debut single in the Danish Singles Chart with "Lad det slå". Soon after, an English-language version called "Let It Go" was released for international use in night clubs. PULS' biggest hit has been the single "Dope" featuring known cosmetician and reality show personality Ole Henriksen, reaching #3 on the Danish Charts.

== Discography ==
=== Albums ===
Year	Title	Peak
Year	Title	DEN
2013	1	7

=== EPs ===
Year	EP title
2012	Platin EP

=== Singles ===
Year	Title	Peak	Certification	Album
Year	Title	DEN	Certification	Album
2010	"Superstar"	—		Non-album releases
2011	"Lad det slå"	16		Non-album releases
2011	"Noget af det"	—		Non-album releases
2011	"Noget af det (Part 2)" (featuring Joey Moe)	—		Non-album releases
2011	"Dope" (featuring Ole Henriksen)	3	2× Platinum (streaming); Gold (download)	Platin EP
2012	"Hvis du går"	14		Platin EP
2012	"Ingen som du"	3		Platin EP
2013	"Ild i mit liv"	7		1

Other single releases

- 2011: "Let It Go" (English version of "Lad det slå")

Featured on

- 2010: "Club Certified" [Kylan Mash feat. Akon, Glasses & PULS]
- 2011: "Kom tilbage nu" (Haider feat. PULS)
