= Lars Bom =

Danish actor (born 1961)

Lars Bom Olesen
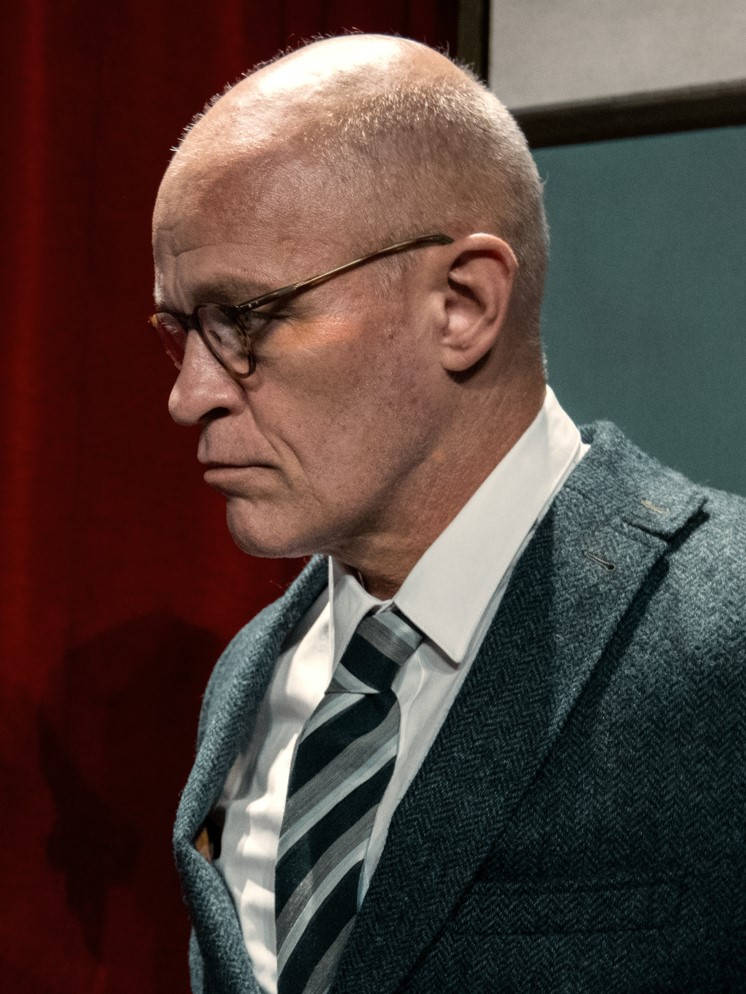
- Lars Bom, 2016.
- Born: 8 April 1961 (age 65); Søborg, Denmark

Lars Bom Olesen (born 8 April 1961) is a Danish actor, educated at The Danish National School of Theatre in 1985. Bom has worked in various roles in theatre, film and television, and won the Best Actor award at the Italian Fantafestival in 1999 for his starring role in the cyberpunk-thriller Skyggen (1998). However, he is best known for his roles in Strisser på Samsø and Rejseholdet.

Besides acting, Bom is also passionate about running and has released a DVD/book about it in 2007.

== Selected filmography ==
Year	Film	Role
1996	Pusher	Uro'er
1996	Bamses Julerejse	Bamse
1998	Skyggen	J.B.
2002	Klatretøsen	Klaus Johansen
2004	A Cry in the Woods	Karsten Skov
2005	Af banen	Torben
2008	Max Embarrassing	Steen Cold
2010	In a Better World	Kriminalassistent
2011	Max Embarrassing 2	Steen Cold
2011	Ronal the Barbarian	Gorak
