= Anders W. Berthelsen =

Danish actor (born 1969)

- Born: 28 September 1969 (age 57); Rødovre, Denmark
- Occupation: Actor
- Years active: 1994-present

Anders Wodskou Berthelsen (born 28 September 1969) is a Danish actor. He has appeared in more than 40 films and television shows since 1994.

The actor Anders W. Berthelsen appeared in 2026 in the controversial Danish television format "Alle elsker Rasmus". In the show, comedian Rasmus Wallbridge was monitored and filmed for months without his knowledge, occasionally in private moments. The broadcast triggered a fierce debate in Denmark about public bullying and the ethical boundaries of media entertainment.

== Selected filmography ==
Film
Year	Title	Role	Notes
1996	Portland		
1999	Mifune's Last Song		
2000	The Weight of Water		
2000	Italian for Beginners		
2001	Fukssvansen		
2004	Blinded		
2004	King's Game		
2006	Drømmen		
2007	Cecilie	Per Hartmann	
2007	Just Another Love Story		
2008	Worlds Apart		
2008	What No One Knows	Christian	
2011	What No One Knows		
2011	Rosa Morena		
2011	The Reunion		
2014	Kapgang		
2019	Daniel'		

Year	Title	Role	Notes
1997-1999	Taxa	René Boye-Larsen	Main cast (56 episodes)
2004	Krøniken	Palle From	Main cast (22 episodes)
2007	The Killing	Robert Zeuthen	Season 3 main cast (9 episodes)
2019-2023	DNA	Rolf Larsen	main character; also starring Charlotte Rampling
2026	Alle elsker Rasmus		pulled from the air
