= Jonas Elmer (director) =

Danish film director

- Born: 14 March 1966 (age 59); Virum, Denmark
- Occupation: Film director
- Years active: 1995–present

Jonas Elmer (born 14 March 1966) is a Danish film director, screenwriter and previously an actor. In 1988 he was a production assistant at the set of Family Business, starring Sean Connery.

Elmer graduated in direction at the National Film School of Denmark in 1995. His debut as a director came with the Danish film Let's Get Lost which won him a Robert and Bodil Award for Best Danish Film. Since then, he has directed the Danish feature films Monas verden and Nynne. He has also directed 21 episodes of the Danish sit-com Langt fra Las Vegas. He directed his first American feature film in 2008, New in Town, starring Renée Zellweger and Harry Connick, Jr, which was released in January 2009. In 2013 he directed the film In Real Life, a production about human desire to have their unmet needs satisfied, and shows their passions, desperation and delusion.

== Filmography ==
Year	Film	Credited as			Note
Year	Film	Director	Writer	Actor	Note
1981	Historien om Kim Skov			Yes	Role: School Pupil
1983	Zappa			Yes	Role: Folke
1983	Rocking Silver			Yes	Role: Young Buller
1985	Den kroniske Uskyld (en. Chronic Innocence)			Yes	Role: Esben
1995	Debut	Yes	Yes		Short film
1997	Let's Get Lost	Yes	Yes		
1998	Det sublime (en. The Sublime)	Yes			Short film
2001	Monas verden (en. Mona's World)	Yes	Yes		
2002–2003	Langt fra Las Vegas	Yes		Yes	TV, directed 21 episodes, has a small acting role in one episode
2005	Nynne^{[I]}	Yes			
2009	New in Town	Yes			First American film
2013	In Real Life	Yes			

I Credited as associate producer.

== Awards and nominations ==
- 1995 Internationales Festival der Filmhochschulen München – Script Preis der Drehbuchwerkstatt München: Debut
- 1998 FIPRESCI Prize – Special Mention: Let's Get Lost – "For its light-hearted and gentle perspective on human nature, its frailties and hopes."
- 1998 Robert Award, winner: Danish feature film of the year – Let's Get Lost
- 1998 Bodil Award, winner: Best Danish Film – Let's Get Lost
- 1999 NatFilm Festival – Night Dreamer Award winner
- 2001 International Filmfestival Mannheim-Heidelberg – Special Prize in Memoriam R.W. Fassbinder, winner: Monas verden
- 2002 Robert award, nomination: Danish feature film of the year – Monas verden
- 2004 Dansk HipHop Pris, winner: Music video director of the year – "Sulten" by Jokeren
