= Morten Kaufmann =

Danish film producer

Morten Kaufmann (born 25 March 1963) is a Danish film and TV producer. He is known for his early involvement with the Dogme 95 film movement, specifically collaborations with Thomas Vinterberg. He is based out of Copenhagen.

== Filmography ==
- Sinan's Wedding, (1997)
- Festen, (1998)
- Fra Vesterbro til verdens ende, (1998, TV series)
- Mifune, (1999)
- Pizza King, (1999)
- Miracle, (2000)
- Kira's Reason: A Love Story, (2001)
- It's All About Love, (2003, line)
- Nordkraft, (2005, line)
- Dark Horse, (2005)
- Prague, (2006)
- A Man Comes Home, (2007)
- White Night, (2007)
- Flame & Citron, (2008)
- The Escape, (2009)
- Submarino, (2010)
- The Hunt, (2012)
- Hemmeligheden, (2012)
- Woolfert, (2013, short)
- Comeback, (2015)
- The Commune, (2016)
- Letters for Amina, (2017, executive)
- Among the Adults, (2017, short, executive)
- Word of God, (2017)
- Lila, (2018, short, executive)
- Hacker, (2019)
- Kaptajn Bimse, (2019)
- Daniel, (2019)
- My Little Dog Maestro: The Trouble with Cats, (2019, short)
- Min lille hund Mester, (2019, TV series)
- Kids on the Silk Road, (2019, TV series)
- Puls, (2020, TV series, executive)
- Shorta, (2020)
