= Kristian Eidnes Andersen =

Danish film audio engineer and composer

- Born: 2 July 1966 (age 60)
- Occupations: Audio engineer, composer
- Years active: 1990–present
- Known for: Antichrist
- Website: kristianeidnes.com

Kristian Eidnes Andersen (born 2 July 1966) is a Danish film audio engineer and composer. He heads the department of sound design at the National Film School of Denmark.

Eidnes Andersen got a degree from the National Film School of Denmark, and has been sound designer on more than 80 films. He has worked with Lars von Trier on e.g. Dancer in the Dark, Breaking the Waves, Manderlay, and Antichrist. For his sound in Antichrist, Eidnes Andersen received a Bodil Special Award.

As a score composer, Eidnes Andersen has credit for more than 20 titles including von Triers Antichrist, Thomas Vinterberg's Submarino, and Per Fly's The Woman That Dreamed About a Man.

== Filmography ==
Work	Year	Credit	Notes
An Eye for an Eye	2025	Composer	Documentary
Vivarium	2019	Composer	Feature
Petra	2018	Composer	Feature
Sami Blood	2016	Composer	Feature
The Heavy Water War	2015	Composer	TV series
Afghan Justice	2015	Sound design	Documentary
Amateurs in Space	2015	Sound engineer	Documentary
Home Sweet Home	2014	Composer	Short fiction
Naked	2014	Sound engineer	Documentary
Growing Pains	2014	Music	Short fiction
Nymphomaniac Director's Cut	2014	Sound engineer	Feature
The Newsroom - Off the Record	2014	Sound engineer	Documentary
The Man Who Saved the World	2013	Music	Documentary
The Half Brother (TV series)	2013	Composer	TV series
A Caretaker's Tale	2012	Composer	Feature
The Great Bird Race	2012	Sound design	Feature
One Day at a Time	2012	Sound engineer	Documentary
Forbandelsen	2012	Composer	Short fiction
Camille. A life, an appartement	2012	Music	Documentary
The Human Scale	2012	Supervising sound editor	Documentary
Me, Myself & Martin Laursen	2012	Music	Documentary
Melancholia	2011	Sound design	Feature
Room 304	2011	Sound design	Feature
The Fir Tree	2011	Music	Short fiction
Love Addict - Stories of Dreams, Obsession and Longing	2011	Sound design	Documentary
Code Blue (2011 film)	2011	Sound design	Feature
ID A	2011	Composer	Feature
People in the Sun	2011	Composer	Feature
Rupture	2011	Composer	Short fiction
The Woman That Dreamed About a Man	2010	Music	Feature
Jernhårde ladies	2010	Music	Documentary
Submarino	2010	Sound design	Feature
A Family	2010	Sound design	Feature
Blood in the Mobile	2010	Sound mixer	Documentary
Lost in Africa	2010	Music	Feature
Klown	2010	Sound design	Feature
The Escape	2009	Sound designer	Feature
Antichrist	2009	Sound design & original music	Feature
Love & Rage (2009 film)	2009	Sound engineer	Feature
Mighty Machines - On Wheels and Tracks	2009	Music	Documentary
Out of Love	2009	Sound engineer	Documentary
The Devilles	2009	Music	Documentary
Affæren i Prag	2009	Sound: post-production	Documentary
Cairo Garbage	2009	Sound design	Documentary
Moving Up (film)	2008	Music	Feature
Everything is Relative	2008	Sound engineer	Documentary
Danish Dynamite	2008	Music	Documentary
Forførerens fald	2008	Sound: post-production	Documentary
Be Good (film)	2008	Music	Feature
Daisy Diamond	2007	Sound designer: trailer	Feature
Occupations	2007	Sound	Short fiction
With Your Permission	2007	Sound designer	Feature
When a Man Comes Home	2007	Sound engineer	Feature
White Night	2007	Sound engineer	Feature
Lasse Lasse Hirtshals	2007	Music	Documentary
After the Wedding	2006	Sound engineer	Feature
Beth's Diary	2006	Sound	Documentary
Sophie	2006	Sound	Short fiction
Snart kommer tiden	2006	Sound engineer: post-production	Short fiction
The Boss of it All	2006	Sound engineer	Feature
Principles of Attraction	2006	Sound	Short fiction
The Monastery	2006	Music mixer	Documentary
Retshjælpen	2006	Sound	Documentary
Den tyske hemmelighed - en film om krig, kærlighed - og løgn	2005	Sound	Documentary
Dear Wendy	2005	Sound engineer	Feature
Manderlay	2005	Sound	Feature
Bang Bang Orangutang	2005	Sound	Feature
Guerrilla Girl	2005	Sound: post-production	Documentary
Brothers	2004	B-sound designer	Feature
Min morfars morder - en film om tilgivelse	2004	Sound engineer	Documentary
My Dad is a Champ	2004	Sound engineer: post-production	Short fiction
Strings	2004	Supervising sound editor	Feature
Dogville	2003	Supervising sound editor	Feature
Frunk	2003	Consultant	Short fiction
Days Around a Damma	2003	Sound	Documentary
Scratch	2003	Sound engineer: post-production	Feature
Day and Night	2004	Sound mixer	Feature
Queenas	2002	Sound	Documentary
It's All About Love	2002	Sound	Feature
Tidy Up	2002	Sound	Documentary
John and Mia	2002	Sound mixer	Short fiction
The Boy Below	2002	Sound	Short fiction
Count Axel	2001	Sound engineer	Feature
Under Bare Poles	2001	Sound	Short fiction
Omveje til frihed	2001	Sound	Documentary
Max	2000	Sound assistant	Feature
Dancer in the Dark	2000	Supervising sound editor	Feature
Dancer	2000	Sound	Documentary
Another Blue Day	2000	Sound	Short fiction
Tut & Tone	1999	Sound	Short fiction
Mifune's Last Song	1999	Sound engineer: 2. unit	Feature
My Beautiful Neighbour	1999	Sound	Short fiction
A Moment	1999	Sound	Documentary
On Our Own	1998	Sound: post-production	Feature
Wildside	1998	Sound	Feature
The Idiots	1998	Sound engineer: 2. unit	Feature
Henning the Hero	1998	Sound	Short fiction
Simona	1998	Sound	Documentary
Loser	1998	Sound	Short fiction
The Island on Bird Street	1997	Sound editor	Feature
Belma	1996	Sound engineer: post-production	Feature
Portland	1996	Sound engineer	Feature
Breaking the Waves	1996	Supervising sound editor	Feature
Crystal Child	1996	Sound	Feature
Frida's First Time	1996	Sound	Short fiction
The Beast Within (1995 film)	1995	B-sound designer	Feature
The Nordkaper in the Indian Ocean	1994	Sound	Documentary
The Boy Who Walked Backwards	1994	Sound	Short fiction
Pretty Boy	1993	Sound assistant	Feature
Jungledyret Hugo	1993	Sound	Feature
Lykkelige Jim	1993	Sound	Short fiction
Rakel Mirakel	1993	Sound	Short fiction
Banana Busters	1990	Sound	Feature
