= 19th Robert Awards =

2001 Danish film awards ceremony

- Date: 3 February 2002
- Hosted by: Michael Carøe and Camilla Miehe-Renard
- Organized by: Danish Film Academy

The 19th Robert Awards ceremony was held on 3 February 2002 in Copenhagen, Denmark. Organized by the Danish Film Academy, the awards honoured the best in Danish and foreign film of 2001.

== Honorees ==
=== Best Danish Film ===
- Kira's Reason: A Love Story – Ole Christian Madsen

=== Best Children's Film ===
- Min søsters børn – Tomas Villum Jensen

=== Best Director ===
- Ole Christian Madsen – Kira's Reason: A Love Story

=== Best Screenplay ===
- Ole Christian Madsen & Mogens Rukov – Kira's Reason: A Love Story

=== Best Actor in a Leading Role ===
- Nikolaj Lie Kaas – Truly Human

=== Best Actress in a Leading Role ===
- Stine Stengade – Kira's Reason: A Love Story

=== Best Actor in a Supporting Role ===
- Troels Lyby – Shake It All About

=== Best Actress in a Supporting Role ===
- Birthe Neumann – Chop Chop

=== Best Cinematography ===
- Jens Schlosser – The King Is Alive

=== Production Design ===
- Søren Skjær – Chop Chop

=== Best Costume Design ===
- Stine Gudmundsen-Holmgreen – Grev Axel

=== Makeup ===
- Agneta von Gegerfelt – Grev Axel

=== Best Special Effects ===
- Hummer Højmark, Steen Lyders and Kris Kolodziejski – Jolly Roger (film)

=== Best Sound Design ===
- Nino Jacobsen – Shake It All About

=== Best Editing ===
- Søren B. Ebbe – Kira's Reason: A Love Story

=== Best Score ===
- Tim Stahl & John Guldberg (Laid Back) – Flyvende farmor

=== Best Song ===
- "Little White Doll" - Joachim Holbek - Send mere slik

=== Best Documentary Short ===
- Radiofolket – Dorte Høegh Brask

=== Best Documentary Feature ===
- Family – Sami Saif & Phie Ambo

=== Best Short Featurette ===
- To Kvinder – Amir Rezazadeh

=== Best Long Featurette ===
- På Ama'r – Klaus Kjeldsen

=== Best Non-American Film ===
- Moulin Rouge! – Baz Luhrmann

=== Best American Film ===
- The Lord of the Rings: The Fellowship of the Ring – Peter Jackson

=== Audience Award ===
- Shake It All About

== See also ==
- 2002 Bodil Awards
