= Anthony Dod Mantle =

British cinematographer (born 1955)

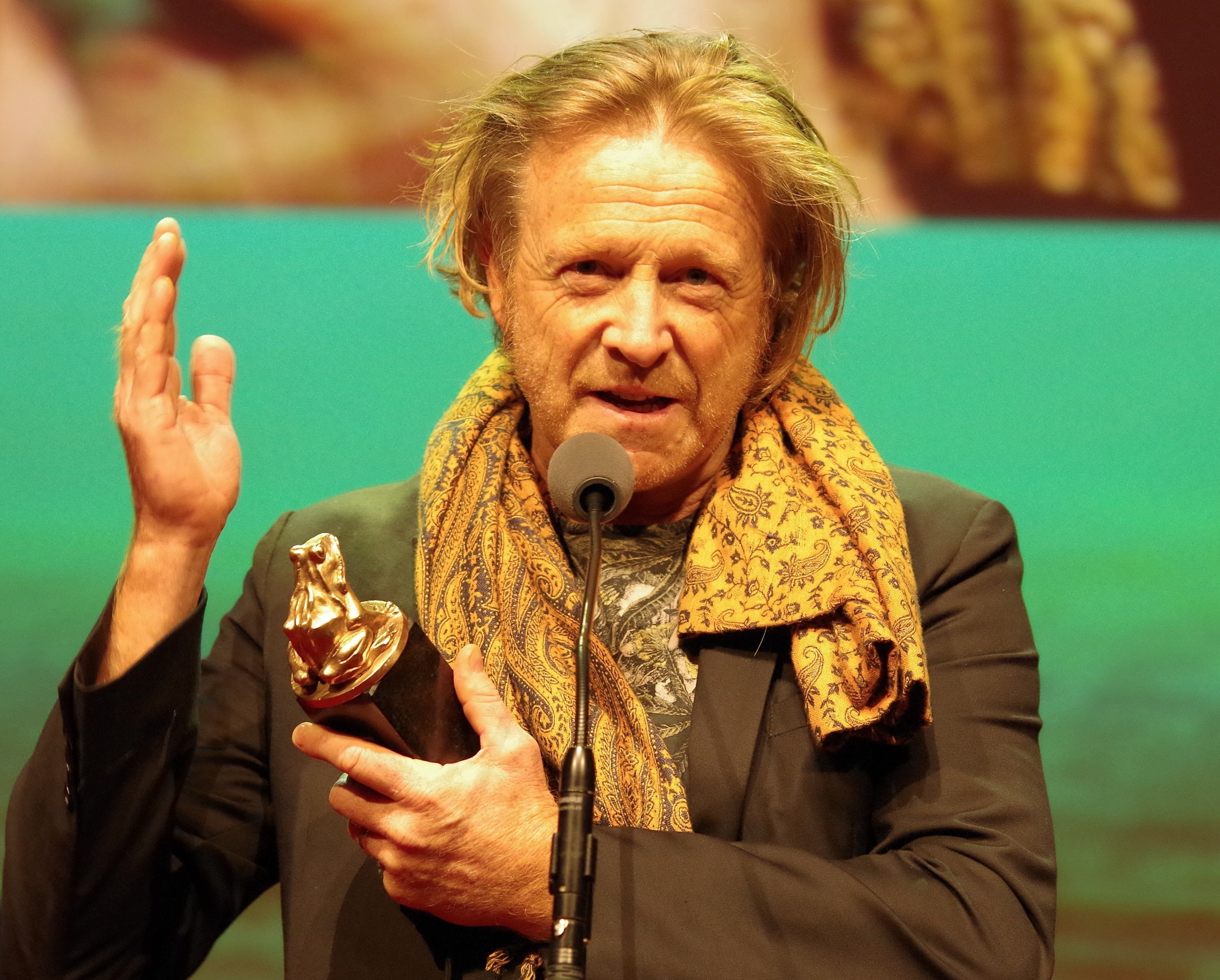
- Dod Mantle in 2016
- Born: 14 April 1955 (age 71); Witney, Oxfordshire, U.K.
- Education: National Film School of Denmark
- Years active: 1990–present
- Website: dodmantle.com

Anthony Dod Mantle (born 14 April 1955) is an English cinematographer, known as a pioneer of digital filmmaking through his collaborations with directors Lars von Trier, Thomas Vinterberg, Danny Boyle, and Kevin Macdonald.

During the 1990s, he was a figure in the Dogme 95 movement.

He won the Academy Award and BAFTA Award for Best Cinematography for Danny Boyle's Slumdog Millionaire (2008), the first digitally-shot film to win an Oscar.

== Early life ==
Dod Mantle was born to Scottish parents in Witney, Oxfordshire in 1955.

He was partly raised in India, where he developed an interest in photography.

He studied photography at the London College of Communication, before enrolling in the National Film School of Denmark in 1985.

== Career ==
Dod Mantle worked on the photography of three Dogme 95 films. He established a notable collaboration with director Thomas Vinterberg, winning a Robert Award for Best Cinematography for 1998's The Celebration. In 1999, he shot Harmony Korine's Julien Donkey-Boy, the first Dogme 95 film produced outside of Europe.

He is a regular collaborator of director Danny Boyle since 28 Days Later (2002), winning an Academy Award and BAFTA for Slumdog Millionaire.

Dod Mantle is included in the book Conversations with Cinematographers by David A Ellis.

He is a member of the British, Danish, and American Society of Cinematographers.

== Style and techniques ==
A veteran of Dogme 95, he is heavily influenced by the cinéma vérité film movement. He is credited with helping popularize the use of "action-style" handheld digital cameras over traditional, stationary 35mm rigs.

Dod Mantle helped pioneer the use of digital cinematography with his early use of home-quality DV in The Celebration. He eventually won an Academy Award for Best Cinematography for his work on Slumdog Millionaire, the first time that award went to a film shot digitally. He used the Red One digital camera on Wallander, the first British television production to do so. Nick Newman wrote that "Anthony Dod Mantle has done more to advance digital photography than nearly any artist in any medium."

Dod Mantle has also experimented with extreme slow motion with high speed cameras in films like Antichrist and Dredd. For Dredd, he helped develop a small form-factor 3D camera for shooting the various action setpiece.

On 28 Years Later, Dod Mantle and director Danny Boyle shot the majority of the film on iPhone 15 Pro Max, often several at the same time.

== Personal life ==
Dod Mantle has been a permanent resident of Denmark since 1985. He lives with his family in Copenhagen.

== Filmography ==
=== Film ===
Year	Title	Director	Notes
1990	Kaj's fødselsdag	Lone Scherfig	with Kim Hattesen
1992	Die Terroristen!	Philip Gröning	
1995	Menneskedyret	Carsten Rudolf	
1995	Operation Cobra	Lasse Spang Olsen	
1996	The Biggest Heroes	Thomas Vinterberg	
1997	Det store flip	Niels Gråbøl	
1997	Nonnebørn	Cæcilia Holbek Trier	
1998	The Celebration	Thomas Vinterberg	
1999	Mifune	Søren Kragh-Jacobsen	
1999	Bornholms stemme	Lotte Svendsen	
1999	Julien Donkey-Boy	Harmony Korine	
2002	28 Days Later	Danny Boyle	
2003	It's All About Love	Thomas Vinterberg	
2003	Dogville	Lars von Trier	
2004	Millions	Danny Boyle	
2005	Dear Wendy	Thomas Vinterberg	
2005	Manderlay	Lars von Trier	
2005	Brothers of the Head	Keith Fulton; Louis Pepe	
2006	The Last King of Scotland	Kevin Macdonald	
2006	Istedgade	Birgitte Stærmose	
2007	Just like Home	Lone Scherfig	
2007	A Man Comes Home	Thomas Vinterberg	
2008	My Black Little Heart	Claire Angelique	
2008	Country Wedding	Valdís Óskarsdóttir	
2008	Slumdog Millionaire	Danny Boyle	
2009	Antichrist	Lars von Trier	
2010	127 Hours	Danny Boyle	with Enrique Chediak
2011	The Eagle	Kevin MacDonald	
2012	Dredd	Pete Travis	
2013	Trance	Danny Boyle	
2013	Rush	Ron Howard	
2015	In the Heart of the Sea	Ron Howard	
2016	Our Kind of Traitor	Susanna White	
2016	Snowden	Oliver Stone	
2017	T2 Trainspotting	Danny Boyle	
2017	First They Killed My Father	Angelina Jolie	
2018	Kursk	Thomas Vinterberg	
2019	Radioactive	Marjane Satrapi	
2019	American Sausage Standoff	Ulrich Thomsen	
2024	My Penguin Friend	David Schurmann	
2025	28 Years Later	Danny Boyle	
2026	The Runner	Kevin Macdonald	
TBA	Porto Rico †	René "Residente" Pérez Joglar	Filming

Documentary film

Year	Title	Director	Notes
1994	Ord	Jens Loftager	
1996	Fredens port	Thomas Stenderup	Documentary short
2003	Krig	Jens Loftager	
2006	Mit Danmark	Jens Loftager	
2008	Trip to Asia – Die Suche nach dem Einklang	Thomas Grube	With Stefan Ciupek, René Dame and Alberto Venzago
2018	Tro	Jens Loftager	With Signe Tora Munk Bencke and Lars Reinholdt

Short film

Year	Title	Director	Notes
1998	Tre äventyr	Birger Larsen	Segment "Ska' vi være kærester?/Ska vi bli ihop?"
2000	Manden med tubaen	Anders Gustafsson	
2003	Små skred	Birgitte Stærmose	
2006	Sophie	Birgitte Stærmose	
2012	Far	Per Dreyer	

=== Television ===
TV movies

Year	Title	Director
2001	Strumpet	Danny Boyle
2001	Vacuuming Completely Nude in Paradise	Danny Boyle

TV series

Year	Title	Director	Notes
2008	Wallander	Philip Martin	2 episodes
2017	The Putin Interviews	Oliver Stone	4 episodes; with Rodrigo Prieto
2020	The Undoing	Susanne Bier	Miniseries
2022	Pistol	Danny Boyle	Miniseries

== Awards and nominations ==
Award	Wins	Nominations
Academy Awards	1	N/A
BAFTA Film Awards	1	2
Bodil Awards	N/A	2
Robert Awards	4	4
Independent Spirit Awards	N/A	2

=== Major awards ===
Academy Awards

Year	Title	Category	Result
2008	Slumdog Millionaire	Best Cinematography	Won

BAFTA Awards

Year	Title	Category	Result
2008	Slumdog Millionaire	Best Cinematography	Won
2009	Wallander	Best Photography & Lighting: Fiction	Won
2010	127 Hours	Best Cinematography	Nominated
2023	Pistol	Best Photography & Lighting: Fiction	Nominated

Bodil Awards

Year	Title	Category	Result
2004	—N/a	Best Cinematographer	Won
2010	Antichrist	Best Cinematographer	Won

European Film Awards

Year	Title	Category	Result
2002	28 Days Later	Best Cinematographer	Won
2003	Dogville	Best Cinematographer	Won
2005	Manderlay	Best Cinematographer	Nominated
2006	The Last King of Scotland	Best Cinematographer	Nominated
2008	Slumdog Millionaire	Best Cinematographer	Won
2009	Antichrist	Best Cinematographer	Won

Independent Spirit Awards

Year	Title	Category	Result
1999	Julien Donkey-Boy	Best Cinematography	Nominated
2005	Brothers of the Head	Best Cinematography	Nominated

Robert Awards

Year	Title	Category	Result
1996	Menneskedyret	Best Cinematography	Won
1999	The Celebration	Best Cinematography	Won
2000	Bornholms stemme	Best Cinematography	Nominated
2000	Mifune	Best Cinematography	Nominated
2004	Dogville	Best Cinematography	Nominated
2004	It's All About Love	Best Cinematography	Won
2006	Manderlay	Best Cinematography	Nominated
2010	Antichrist	Best Cinematography	Won

=== Critics awards ===
Institution	Year	Title	Category	Result
Boston Society of Film Critics	2008	Slumdog Millionaire	Best Cinematography	Runner-up
Chicago Film Critics Association	2008	Slumdog Millionaire	Best Cinematography	Nominated
Critics' Choice Movie Awards	2011	127 Hours	Best Cinematography	Nominated
Dallas–Fort Worth Film Critics Association	2010	127 Hours	Best Cinematography	Won
Houston Film Critics Society	2008	Slumdog Millionaire	Best Cinematography	Nominated
Houston Film Critics Society	2010	127 Hours	Best Cinematography	Nominated
Los Angeles Film Critics Association	2008	Slumdog Millionaire	Best Cinematography	Nominated
Online Film Critics Society	2008	Slumdog Millionaire	Best Cinematography	Nominated
Online Film Critics Society	2010	127 Hours	Best Cinematography	Nominated
San Diego Film Critics Society	2008	Slumdog Millionaire	Best Cinematography	Won
San Diego Film Critics Society	2010	127 Hours	Best Cinematography	Nominated
Seattle Film Critics Society	2014	Rush	Best Cinematography	Nominated
St. Louis Film Critics Association	2008	Slumdog Millionaire	Best Cinematography	Nominated
National Society of Film Critics	2008	Slumdog Millionaire	Best Cinematography	Won
New York Film Critics Circle	2008	Slumdog Millionaire	Best Cinematography	Won
Washington D.C. Area Film Critics Association	2010	127 Hours	Best Cinematography	Nominated

=== Other awards ===
Institution	Year	Title	Category	Result
American Society of Cinematographers	2009	Slumdog Millionaire	Outstanding Achievement in Cinematography	Won
Buenos Aires International; Festival of Independent Cinema	2000	Julien Donkey-Boy	ADF Cinematography Award - Special Mention	Won
British Independent Film Awards	2006	The Last King of Scotland	Best Technical Achievement	Won
British Independent Film Awards	2008	Slumdog Millionaire	Best Technical Achievement	Nominated
British Society of Cinematographers	2009	Slumdog Millionaire	Best Cinematography	Nominated
Camerimage Festival	1998	The Celebration	Golden Frog	Nominated
Camerimage Festival	1999	Mifune	Golden Frog	Nominated
Camerimage Festival	2008	Slumdog Millionaire	Golden Frog	Won
Camerimage Festival	2010	127 Hours	Golden Frog	Nominated
Camerimage Festival	2016	Snowden	Golden Frog	Nominated
Camerimage Festival	2016	Snowden	Bronze Frog	Won
Camerimage Festival	2017	First They Killed My Father	Golden Frog	Nominated
Camerimage Festival	2017	First They Killed My Father	Bronze Frog	Won
Camerimage Festival	2020	The Undoing	Golden Frog	Nominated
Camerimage Festival	2022	Pistol	Golden Frog	Nominated
Chlotrudis Awards	2004	28 Days Later	Best Cinematography	Nominated
Chlotrudis Awards	2009	Slumdog Millionaire	Best Cinematography	Nominated
Chlotrudis Awards	2010	Antichrist	Best Cinematography	Nominated
European Film Awards	2002	28 Days Later	Best Cinematographer	Won
European Film Awards	2003	Dogville	Best Cinematographer	Won
European Film Awards	2005	Manderlay	Best Cinematographer	Nominated
European Film Awards	2006	The Last King of Scotland	Best Cinematographer	Nominated
European Film Awards	2008	Slumdog Millionaire	Best Cinematographer	Won
European Film Awards	2009	Antichrist	Best Cinematographer	Won
Evening Standard British Film Awards	2007	Brothers of the Head	Best Technical Achievement	Won
Evening Standard British Film Awards	2007	The Last King of Scotland	Best Technical Achievement	Won
Fangoria Chainsaw Awards	2025	28 Years Later	Best Cinematography	Pending
Royal Television Society Craft & Design Awards	2009	Wallander	Best Photography: Drama	Nominated
Satellite Awards	2010	127 Hours	Best Cinematography	Nominated
Stockholm Film Festival	2006	The Last King of Scotland	Best Cinematography	Won
Tallinn Black Nights Film Festival	2019	American Sausage Standoff	Best Cinematographer	Nominated
Manaki Brothers Film Festival	2009	—N/a	Golden Camera 300	Won
NatFilm Festival	2000	—N/a	Night Dreamer Award	Won
