= 55th Bodil Awards =

2002 Danish film awards ceremony

- Date: 3 March 2002
- Site: Imperial Cinema, Copenhagen
- Hosted by: Søren Østergaard and Louise Mieritz

Highlights
- Best Film: Kira's Reason: A Love Story
- Best Actor: Jens Okking; One-Hand Clapping
- Best Actress: Stine Stengade; Kira's Reason: A Love Story
- Most awards: Kira's Reason: A Love Story and One-Hand Clapping (2)

The 55th Bodil Awards were held on 3 March 2002 in the Imperial Cinema in Copenhagen, Denmark, honouring the best national and foreign films of 2001. Søren Østergaard and Louise Mieritz hosted the event which was broadcast live on DR2. Ole Christian Madsen's Kira's Reason: A Love Story won the awards for Best Film and Best Actress in a Leading Role (Stine Stengade). Jens Oking and Susanne Juhasz, both from One-Hand Clapping, won the awards for Best Leading Actor and Best Supporting Actress respectively, and Tommy Kenter in Fukssvansen received the Best Supporting Actor award. The Lord of the Rings: The Fellowship of the Ring was named Best American Film and Swedish Songs from the Second Floor Best Non-American Film.

Morten Piil and Peter Schepelern both received a Bodil Special Award for their contribution to increasing the knowledge of and interest in Danish film. Piil is a film critic for Dagbladet Information and Schepelern a scholar from University of Copenhagen, Institute for Film and Media Sciences, and both have edited large encyclopaedic works. Dan Laustsen was honoured with the Johan Ankerstjernes Award for Cinematography.

== Winners and nominees ==
Winners and nominees:

=== Best Danish Film ===
Kira's Reason: A Love Story

- A Song for Martin
- Family
- One-Hand Clapping
- Truly Human

=== Best Actor in a Leading Role ===
Jens Okking – One-Hand Clapping

- Lars Mikkelsen – Kira's Reason: A Love Story
- Troels Lyby – Truly Human
- Nikolaj Lie Kaas – Truly Human
- Sven Wollter – A Song for Martin

=== Best Actress in a Leading Role ===
Stine Stengade – Kira's Reason: A Love Story

- Sidse Babett Knudsen – Mona's World
- Charlotte Munck – Hush Little Baby
- Viveka Seldahl – A Song for Martin

=== Best Actor in a Supporting Role ===
Tommy Kenter – Fukssvansen

- Troels II Munk – Truly Human

=== Best Actress in a Supporting Role ===
Susanne Juhasz – One-Hand Clapping

- Birthe Neumann – Fukssvansen

=== Best American Film ===
The Lord of the Rings: The Fellowship of the Ring

- Traffic
- Shrek
- You Can Count on Me
- The Pledge

=== Best Non-American Film ===
Songs from the Second Floor

- In the Mood for Love
- Love is a Bitch
- The Circle
- Moulin Rouge

=== Bodil Special Award ===
- Morten Piil and Peter Schepelern

=== Johan Ankerstjerne Award for Cinematography ===
- Dan Laustsen

== See also ==
- 2002 Robert Awards
