= Nimbus Film =

Danish film production company

- Company type: Privately owned
- Industry: Motion picture
- Founded: 1993
- Headquarters: Copenhagen, Denmark
- Key people: Birgitte Hald and Bo Ehrhardt
- Products: Film
- Owner: Birgitte Hald and Bo Ehrhardt (67%); TF1 Group (33%)
- Parent: Studio TF1 (33%)
- Website: nimbusfilm.dk

Nimbus Film is Denmark's third largest film production company. It has produced more than 30 feature films and many shorts and documentaries.

Of their more known feature films are the Dogme 95 movies The Celebration (1998, directed by Thomas Vinterberg) which won the Jury Prize at the Cannes Film Festival in 1998, and Mifune's Last Song (1999, directed by Søren Kragh-Jacobsen) which won the Silver Bear at Berlin International Film Festival 1999. Recent successes include A Soap (2006, directed by Pernille Fischer Christensen) also winner of the Silver Bear at Berlin International Film Festival in 2006, and the World War II film Flame & Citron (2008, directed by Ole Christian Madsen) a huge box office hit in Denmark in 2008, and distributed worldwide. In 2010 Thomas Vinterberg's Submarino was selected to the main competition at The Berlin Film Festival.

Nimbus Film was founded in 1993 by Birgitte Hald and Bo Ehrhardt, who today own the company alongside the TF1 Group-owned Studio TF1 (formerly Newen), who took a 33% stake in the company in 2018.

== Selected productions ==
- The Beast Within (1995) by Carsten Rudolf
- The Greatest Heroes (1996) by Thomas Vinterberg
- The Celebration (1998) by Thomas Vinterberg
- Pizza King (1999) by Ole Christian Madsen
- Mifune's Last Song (1999) by Søren Kragh-Jacobsen
- Detector (2000, co-production) by Pål Jackman
- Miracle (2000) by Natasha Arthy
- Max (2000) by Trine Piil Christensen
- Kira's Reason (2001) by Ole Christian Madsen
- Catch That Girl (Klatretøsen) (2002) by Hans Fabian Wullenweber
- Gemini (2003) by Hans Fabian Wullenweber
- Scratch (2003) by Anders Gustafsson
- Torremolinos 73 (2003, co-production) by Pablo Berger
- Skagerrak (2003) by Søren Kragh-Jacobsen
- Old, New, Borrowed and Blue (2003) by Natasha Arthy
- It's All About Love (2003) by Thomas Vinterberg
- King's Game (2004) by Nikolaj Arcel
- Niceland (2004, co-production) by Fridrik Thor Fridriksson
- Count to 100 (2004) by Linda Krogsøe Holmberg
- Dark Horse (2005) by Dagur Kári
- Angels in Fast Motion (2005) by Ole Christian Madsen
- Dear Wendy (2005, co-production) by Thomas Vinterberg
- Prague (2006) by Ole Christian Madsen
- A Soap (2006) by Pernille Fischer Christensen
- Island of Lost Souls (2007, co-production) by Nikolaj Arcel
- A Man Comes Home (2007) by Thomas Vinterberg
- White Night (2007) by Jannik Johansen
- Cecilie (2007) by Hans Fabian Wullenweber
- Fighter (2007) by Natasha Arthy
- Flame & Citron (2008) by Ole Christian Madsen
- What No One Knows (2008) by Søren Kragh-Jacobsen
- Over Gaden Under Vandet (2009) by Charlotte Sieling
- Camping (2009) by Jacob Bitsch
- Sorte Kugler (2009) by Anders Matthesen
- Flugten (2009) by Kathrine Windfeld
- Eksperimentet (2010) by Louise Friedberg
- Submarino (2010) by Thomas Vinterberg
- Valhalla Rising (2010) by Nicolas Winding Refn
- Hold om mig (2010) by Karpar Munk
- Superclàsico (2011) by Ole Christian Madsen
- Bora Bora (2011) by Hans Fabian Wullenweber
