= The Biggest Heroes =

1996 Danish comedy film

- De største helte
- Directed by: Thomas Vinterberg
- Written by: Bo Hr. Hansen; Thomas Vinterberg
- Produced by: Birgitte Hald; Peter Aalbæk Jensen
- Starring: Thomas Bo Larsen; Ulrich Thomsen as Peter; Mia Maria Back; Bjarne Henriksen; Paprika Steen; Trine Dyrholm; Hella Joof
- Cinematography: Anthony Dod Mantle
- Edited by: Jesper W. Nielsen; Valdís Óskarsdóttir
- Music by: Nikolaj Egelund
- Production company: Nimbus Film
- Distributed by: Scanbox Entertainment
- Release date: 8 November 1996
- Running time: 90 min
- Country: Denmark
- Language: Danish

The Biggest Heroes (Danish: De største helte) is a 1996 Danish comedy road film directed by Thomas Vinterberg. It was Vinterberg's debut feature film.

== Synopsis ==
Karsten, a bank robber on probation, gets the surprise of his life when one of his exes, Lisbeth, shows up out of the blue and announces that he has a twelve-year-old daughter, Louise, and that he must take care of her. Her stepfather, Allan, is abusive and she can no longer stay with him. Karsten, his partner-in-crime Peter, and Louise flee to Sweden as Karsten's probation has expired. Allan goes in pursuit of the girl. In Sweden, Karsten's plan is to hole up with another old flame, Pernille, who lives in the north with her friend Eve. As Allan catches up with the trio, he engages in an altercation with Karsten and ends up dead. All the while, Karsten is chased by the police, who uncover one crime after another, including Allan's death. In a final confrontation with officers of the law at an airport, both Karsten and Peter are gunned down, while Louise returns to Helsinki.

== Cast ==
- Thomas Bo Larsen as Karsten
- Ulrich Thomsen as Peter
- Mia Maria Back as Louise
- Bjarne Henriksen as Allan
- Paprika Steen as Lisbeth
- Trine Dyrholm as Pernille
- Hella Joof as Eva
