= The Commune =

2016 film

- Film poster
- Directed by: Thomas Vinterberg
- Written by: Thomas Vinterberg; Tobias Lindholm
- Based on: The Commune by Thomas Vinterberg and Mogens Rukov
- Produced by: Morten Kauffman
- Starring: Ulrich Thomsen; Trine Dyrholm
- Cinematography: Jesper Tøffner
- Distributed by: Nordisk Film
- Release date: 14 January 2016
- Running time: 110 minutes
- Country: Denmark
- Language: Danish
- Box office: $3.64 million

The Commune (Danish: Kollektivet) is a 2016 Danish drama film directed by Thomas Vinterberg. It was selected to compete for the Golden Bear at the 66th Berlin International Film Festival. At Berlin, Trine Dyrholm won the Silver Bear for Best Actress. It was named as one of three films that could be chosen as the Danish submission for the Best Foreign Language Film at the 89th Academy Awards but was not selected.

== Cast ==
- Ulrich Thomsen as Erik
- Fares Fares as Allon
- Trine Dyrholm as Anna
- Julie Agnete Vang as Mona
- Lars Ranthe as Ole

== Production ==
The film is based on the play The Commune, which Thomas Vinterberg and Mogens Rukov wrote on commission from the Burgtheater in Vienna. Vinterberg grew up in a commune, which was his inspiration for writing about the subject. Rukov had been Vinterberg's teacher at the National Film School of Denmark and the two had previously co-written Vinterberg's 1998 film The Celebration. For the film adaptation of The Commune, Vinterberg co-wrote the screenplay with Tobias Lindholm and added more locations to the story, which in the original play is set entirely in one room.

== Reception ==
The Commune has a 71% approval rating on Rotten Tomatoes based on 94 reviews, with an average rating of 6.4/10. The website critics' consensus reads: "The Commune may not stand with Thomas Vinterberg's greatest work, but the end results remain thought-provoking and overall absorbing." According to Metacritic, which sampled 22 critics and calculated an average score of 60 out of 100, the film received "mixed or average reviews".
