= Julien Donkey-Boy =

1999 film by Harmony Korine

- Theatrical release poster
- Directed by: Harmony Korine
- Written by: Harmony Korine
- Produced by: Cary Woods; Scott Macaulay; Robin O'Hara
- Starring: Ewen Bremner; Chloë Sevigny; Werner Herzog; Evan Neumann
- Cinematography: Anthony Dod Mantle
- Edited by: Valdís Óskarsdóttir
- Music by: David Pajo
- Production companies: 391 Productions; Forensic Films; Independent Pictures
- Distributed by: Fine Line Features
- Release dates: September 7, 1999 (Venice Film Festival); October 8, 1999 (New York City); October 15, 1999 (Los Angeles)
- Running time: 99 minutes
- Country: United States
- Language: English
- Box office: $92,442

Julien Donkey-Boy is a 1999 American experimental drama film written and directed by Harmony Korine, and starring Ewen Bremner, Chloë Sevigny, and Werner Herzog. The story follows Julien, a man with untreated schizophrenia, and his dysfunctional relationship with his sister, younger brother, and their father.

Julien Donkey-Boy was the sixth film to be made under the self-imposed rules of the Dogme 95 manifesto, and the first non-European film to be made under the Dogme 95 "vow of chastity".

== Plot ==
Julien, a young man with untreated schizophrenia, meets a young boy playing with several turtles in a New York City park. Fascinated by the turtles, Julien asks if he can have one. When he is denied, he strangles the boy, then buries his body in the mud before praying for mercy from God.

At home, Julien resides with his dysfunctional family, consisting of his domineering and emotionless German father; his childlike pregnant sister Pearl; his younger brother, Chris, an aspiring wrestler who spends his days exercising and practicing wrestling moves; and their paternal grandmother, who is largely disconnected from the rest of the family.

The family's father spends the majority of his time recounting national historical narratives, drinking, and inflicting psychological and physical abuse on Chris. During one of Chris's exercise sessions, his father forces him outside in the cold and hoses him down with water. He also pines for his deceased wife, going so far as begging Chris to wear his mother's wedding dress and dance with him. Meanwhile, Julien works as a teacher's aide at a school for the blind. Julien spends most of his spare time going to confession, muttering to himself on the streets, and imagining conversations with Adolf Hitler.

Julien is also riddled with grief over his mother's death, and Pearl sometimes soothes him by pretending to be their mother on the telephone. Pearl spends most of her days searching for baby clothes for her soon-to-be-born child, and making lists of her favorite baby names. Searching for other hobbies, she decides to take up learning to play the harp. Chris compulsively practices wrestling moves on trash cans, and sometimes incites matches with Julien. Their father recounts historical stories, lambasts Julien for "artsy-fartsy" poetry and Pearl for being "a dilettante and a slut," and pines for his dead wife.

Julien and Pearl accompany their father to a local Baptist church, where the sermon has a profound impact on Julien. Some time later, Pearl and Julien spend a day together going ice skating at an indoor skating rink. Julien tries to sell some homemade skates to a Hasidic Jewish boy and Pearl takes to the ice despite being heavily pregnant. She trips, landing on her abdomen and causing a miscarriage. At the hospital, Julien convinces a nurse to let him hold the baby, saying it is his. She allows it, but while alone with the baby, Julien escapes home on a bus. Julien goes to his room, hides under the blankets, cradles the baby and mutters prayers.

== Cast ==
- Ewen Bremner as Julien
- Chloë Sevigny as Pearl
- Werner Herzog as Father
- Evan Neumann as Chris
- Joyce Korine as Grandma
- Chrissy Kobylak as Chrissy
- Victor Varnado as Rapper
- Brian Fisk as Pond boy
- Virginia Reath as Gynecologist
- Alvin Law as Card-playing neighbor
- Tom Mullica as Magician
- Ricky Ashley as Hasidic boy
- Carmela García as Nurse
- Will Oldham as Party-goer

== Production ==
Julien Donkey-Boy was the first American film made in accordance with the rules of the Danish filmmaking collective Dogme 95. Shot in New York on MiniDV tape, the film was transferred to 16mm film before being blown up to 35mm film for the master print. The camera used for filming was the Canon XL-1. Korine used this method to give the film a low-definition, grainy aesthetic. Much of the actors' dialogue was improvised.

The film utilizes several cinematographic styles, including stop-motion photography, parallel cuts, and still photographs in order to tell its story.

The film’s budget of $1.5 million was mostly spent on travel and work visas for Herzog and Bremner, as well as post-production in Denmark.

=== Dogme 95 ===
Korine broke a few of the Dogme 95 rules in making the film. Dogme 95's tenets stipulate all the camerawork must be handheld, but this film uses hidden cameras that are technically not handheld. There is also the use of non-diegetic music (Oval's "Mediation" from Systemisch in the ice-skating scene, same group's "Shop In Store" from 94 Diskont). Finally, the film breaks the rule that the director must not be credited; however, the film only displays Harmony Korine's name and not an official director title.

Despite these transgressions, the original Dogme 95 committee endorsed Julien Donkey-Boy. In an interview on the Epidemic DVD, Lars von Trier, Dogme 95 co-creator, lauded Korine's ability to interpret the rules creatively.

== Release ==
Julien Donkey-Boy premiered at the Venice Film Festival in September 1999. It received a limited theatrical release in the United States, screening the Angelika Film Center in New York City on October 8, 1999. It opened in Los Angeles the following week, on October 15, 1999, followed by a San Francisco release on October 29, 1999.

The film continued to have select engagements at arthouse theaters throughout the remainder of the year, opening in November at Cinema 21 in Portland, Oregon; the Village Art Cinema 4 in Austin, Texas; and the Fine Arts Theater in Chicago. The film later screened at the Alliance Cinema in Miami, Florida in December of that year.

== Reception ==
=== Box office ===
The film grossed a total of $80,226 by November 1999. The film grossed $85,400 domestically and $7,042 in other countries for a worldwide total of $92,442.

=== Critical response ===
Julien Donkey-Boy currently holds a 29% approval rating on Rotten Tomatoes based on 38 reviews, with an average rating of 5.3/10. The website's critical consensus reads, "Director Harmony Korine takes a big stylistic swing that will miss with most audiences, producing an unfocused and mean-spirited art film with a bitter aftertaste." The film has a weighted average score of 54 out of 100 on Metacritic based on 23 reviews, indicating "mixed or average" reviews.

Empire said that "Despite some creditable performances, Korine's bizarre, shambling direction renders the result less ground-breakingly experimental than rectum-numbingly dull." Edward Guthmann of the San Francisco Chronicle called the film "A self-indulgent mess."

Despite a sense of negative reaction to Julien Donkey-Boy, it was praised by some critics. Kevin Thomas of the Los Angeles Times gave the film a positive review, saying the film attained a "depth of compassion and understanding ... [it] acquires a spiritual dimension that allows it ultimately to become an act of redemption". Lisa Schwarzbaum from Entertainment Weekly awarded the film a score of B+, describing the film as "an exciting artistic leap", while writing that "Korine — working with cinematographer Anthony Dod Mantle, who shot the Dogma [sic] breakthrough The Celebration — discovers visual ways to convey emotional terrain that will serve him well, I hope, even after he outgrows shock as an artistic goal." Wesley Morris of the San Francisco Examiner praised the film as "tighter and more involving" than Korine's previous feature, Gummo, and awarded it a three and a half star-rating out of four.

Additional praise for the film came from Chicago Sun Times film critic Roger Ebert, who gave the film 3/4 stars, saying it "adds up to something, unlike a lot of movies where individual shots are sensational, but they add up to nothing"; Ebert did, however, note that the film had a very limited audience: "The odds are good that most people will dislike this film and be offended by it. For others, it will provoke sympathy rather than scorn. You know who you are".
