= Submarino =

2010 film

- Theatrical release poster
- Directed by: Thomas Vinterberg
- Screenplay by: Tobias Lindholm; Thomas Vinterberg
- Based on: Submarino by Jonas T. Bengtsson
- Produced by: Morten Kaufmann
- Starring: Jakob Cedergren; Peter Plaugborg
- Cinematography: Charlotte Bruus Christensen
- Edited by: Valdís Óskarsdóttir; Andri Steinn Guðmundsson
- Music by: Kristian Eidnes Andersen; Thomas Blachman
- Production company: Nimbus Film
- Distributed by: Sandrew Metronome
- Release dates: 13 February 2010 (Berlinale); 25 March 2010
- Running time: 110 minutes
- Country: Denmark
- Language: Danish
- Budget: €1.8 million ($2.5 million)
- Box office: $0.816 million

Submarino is a 2010 Danish drama film directed by Thomas Vinterberg, starring Jakob Cedergren and Peter Plaugborg. It is based on the 2007 novel Submarino by Jonas T. Bengtsson, and focuses on two brothers on the bottom of Danish society, with lives marked by violence and drug addiction. The film was produced by Nimbus Film. As a condition from the financier TV 2, half of the cast and crew were novices, which the director enjoyed as it gave an experience similar to his earliest films.

Submarino premiered in the main competition of the 60th Berlin International Film Festival. The film won the 2010 Nordic Council Film Prize. It was met by positive reviews in Denmark and has been nominated for 15 Robert Awards.

== Plot ==
The story of two brothers who lose track of each other after an unstable childhood until they meet up again in prison is the focus of former Dogme 95 director Thomas Vinterberg's film based on a book by Jonas T. Bengtsson, a Danish novelist celebrated for his unflinching realism. The film's title refers to a method of torture known as ‘submarino’ in which the victim's head is held under water until just before the point of drowning.

Nick and his younger brother have grown up in terrible circumstances: their childhood was marked by poverty, abuse and an alcoholic mother until the family was torn apart by tragedy. Nick is now thirty-three and has just been released from prison. He's a man who knows what he wants: to train hard and drink hard in order to stand up against a hard world. A bodybuilder, he lives in a dilapidated hostel on the outskirts of Copenhagen. His brother is a junkie, a heroin dealer, and a single father for whom only two things count in life: his daily fix and a better life for his six-year-old son, Martin.

The brothers may live separate lives in grim Copenhagen, yet they are somehow searching for each other. What binds them is their mutual struggle for a life worth living. Occasionally their paths cross, but they only really find each other in prison. And that's almost too late for them.

== Cast ==
- Jakob Cedergren as Nick
- Peter Plaugborg as Nick's brother
- Patricia Schumann as Sofie
- Morten Rose as Ivan
- Gustav Fischer Kjærulff as Martin
- Henrik Strube as Jimmy Gule
- Helene Reingaard Neumann as Mona
- Sebastian Bull Sarning as young Nick
- Mads Broe Andersen as young Nick's brother
- Dar Salim as Goran

== Production ==
In June 2008 it was announced that Thomas Vinterberg would adapt Jonas T. Bengtsson's novel which had been well received by the Danish media the year before. Submarino was launched as one of four films on which Nimbus Film would spend the 1.4 million kroner they recently had been granted from the European Union's MEDIA Programme. The film was made without support from the Danish Film Institute. Instead it received public funding through the broadcaster TV 2, whose condition for providing the money was that half of the cast and production crew would be first-timers. Vinterberg thought the condition helped the film's authenticity and likened the experience to his very earliest works: "That eagerness, energy, whole-hearted devotion from people starting a career was amazing. I had been missing this from when I did my graduation film at the Danish Film School, prior to Dogma. I enjoyed that." Feature-film debutants included the cinematographer Charlotte Bruus Christensen, the scriptwriter Tobias Lindholm and the stage actor Peter Plaugborg who played Nick's brother. The budget was around 1.8 million euro.

== Reception ==
=== Critical response ===
Ebbe Iversen rated Submarino four out of six in Berlingske Tidende. Iversen wrote that Vinterberg has "shaped his film as fierce social realism almost totally exposed for the glimpses of humour that make a miserable life easier to bear in leading social realists like Ken Loach and Mike Leigh. Submarino is harder and more brutal, but, behind its harsh facade, carried by sympathy for the characters, and it is first and foremost created with a completely fearsome consistency, which one hasn't seen the like of in Thomas Vinterberg since The Celebration." Peter Nielsen of Information was even more positive. He thought the story and subject by themselves were strong enough to make an excellent film, and continued: "but what elevates Submarino into a great work of art, is the symbolic redemption of the serious material. You see it in the ritual opening scene, and you see it several times underway in a tight symbology, which escorts and underpins the story." The film failed to reach a large audience during the theatrical run and had only 46,000 admissions in Denmark.

=== Accolades ===
Submarino was Denmark's candidate for the 2010 Nordic Council Film Prize, which it won. Jakob Cedergren was nominated for the Best Actor prize at the 23rd European Film Awards. On the national level, the film was nominated for 15 Robert Awards, voted by members of the Film Academy of Denmark, and four Bodil Awards, voted by domestic film critics.

Award	Category	Recipient(s)	Result
Bodil Awards	Best Danish Film	Thomas Vinterberg	Nominated
Bodil Awards	Best Actor	Jakob Cedergren	Nominated
Bodil Awards	Best Actor	Peter Plauborg	Nominated
Bodil Awards	Best Supporting Actor	Gustav Fischer Kjærulff	Nominated
Bodil Awards	Best Supporting Actress	Patricia Schumann	Won
European Film Awards	Best Actor	Jacob Cedergren	Nominated
Nordic Council	Nordic Council Film Prize	Thomas Vinterberg, Tobias Lindholm and Morten Kaufmann	Won
Robert Awards	Best Film	Morten Kaufmann and Thomas Vinterberg	Nominated
Robert Awards	Best Actor	Jakob Cedergren	Nominated
Robert Awards	Best Supporting Actor	Gustav Fischer Kjærulff	Nominated
Robert Awards	Best Supporting Actor	Peter Plaugborg	Won
Robert Awards	Best Supporting Actress	Patricia Schumann	Nominated
Robert Awards	Best Director	Thomas Vinterberg	Nominated
Robert Awards	Best Screenplay	Tobias Lindholm and Thomas Vinterberg	Nominated
Robert Awards	Best Cinematography	Charlotte Bruus Christensen	Nominated
Robert Awards	Best Production Design	Torben Stig Nielsen	Won
Robert Awards	Best Costumes	Margrethe Rasmussen	Won
Robert Awards	Best Make-Up	Bjørg Serup	Nominated
Robert Awards	Best Editing	Valdís Óskarsdóttir and Andri Steinn Guðmundsson	Nominated
Robert Awards	Best Sound Design	Kristian Eidnes Andersen	Nominated
Robert Awards	Best Music	Thomas Blachman and Kristian Eidnes Andersen	Won
Robert Awards	Best Original Song	Agnes Obel for "Riverside"	Won
