= Mifune (film) =

- Directed by: Søren Kragh-Jacobsen
- Written by: Søren Kragh-Jacobsen; Anders Thomas Jensen
- Produced by: Birgitte Hald; Morten Kaufmann
- Starring: Iben Hjejle; Anders W. Berthelsen
- Cinematography: Anthony Dod Mantle
- Edited by: Valdís Óskarsdóttir
- Music by: Thor Backhausen; Karl Bille; Christian Sievert
- Distributed by: Scanbox Entertainment
- Release date: 12 March 1999
- Running time: 98 minutes
- Countries: Denmark; Sweden
- Language: Danish
- Box office: 351,000 admissions (Denmark)

Mifune (Danish: Mifunes sidste sang, "Mifune's Last Song") is a 1999 romantic comedy film, starring Iben Hjejle and Anders W. Berthelsen. Directed by Søren Kragh-Jacobsen, it was the third film made according to the Dogme 95 group rules. The film was a great success in Denmark and an international blockbuster, ranked among the ten best-selling Danish films worldwide. It was produced by Nimbus Film.

At the 49th Berlin International Film Festival, the film won the Silver Bear – Special Jury Prize and Iben Hjejle won an Honourable Mention. It was the Danish submission for Best Foreign Language Film for the Academy Awards, but was not nominated among the finalists.

== Plot ==
Kresten had moved from his parents' farm on Lolland, an out-of-the-way small Danish island, to Copenhagen to pursue his career. When his father dies, he has to move back to the farm where not much has happened since he left. He places an ad in the local newspaper to get help running the farm. He has to support his brother, Rud, who needs special care. Kresten has entertained Rud by imitating the noted late Japanese actor, Toshiro Mifune, featured as a samurai. The prostitute Liva, who is running away from harassing telephone calls, answers the ad.

== Cast ==
- Iben Hjejle as Liva
- Anders W. Berthelsen as Kresten
- Jesper Asholt
- Emil Tarding
- Anders Hove
- Sofie Gråbøl
- Paprika Steen
- Susanne Storm
- Ellen Hillingsø
- Sidse Babett Knudsen
- Søren Fauli
- Søren Malling
- Kjeld Nørgaard
- Kirsten Vaupel
- Torben Jensen
- Klaus Bondam
- Sofie Stougaard

== Title ==
The title of the film is a reference to the late Toshiro Mifune (1920–1997), a prolific Japanese film actor whose roles included that of Kikuchiyo, one of Akira Kurosawa's Seven Samurai. It also refers to Bjørnstjerne Bjørnson's poem Sidste Sang (1870, Last Song).

== Reception and awards ==
The romantic comedy was immensely popular, ranked as the seventh-highest grossing film of the year in Denmark, with admissions of 351,000.

It was screened at the 49th Berlin International Film Festival, where the film won the Silver Bear – Special Jury Prize and Iben Hjejle won an Honourable Mention. Denmark selected this film as its submission for Best Foreign Language Film for the Academy Awards, but it did not make the final list of nominees.

On the review aggregator website Rotten Tomatoes, 74% of 31 critics' reviews are positive. Metacritic, which uses a weighted average, assigned the film a score of 57 out of 100, based on 24 critics, indicating "mixed or average" reviews.

Roger Ebert gave the film 3 out of 4 stars, describing it as "the most fun and the least dogmatic" movie of the Dogme 95 movement.

== Confession ==
The Dogme 95 group established rigid rules to govern their 'chastity' in filmmaking. Thomas Vinterberg, in the first Dogme 95 film, went further: make a confession if elements of the film do not comply with the Dogme-rules. The confession is written from the director's point of view.

Kragh-Jacobsen published his confession about Mifune:

As one of the DOGME 95 brethren and co-signatory of the Vow of Chastity I feel moved to confess to the following transgressions of the aforesaid Vow during the production of Dogme 3 – Mifune. Please note that the film has been approved as a Dogme work, as only one genuine breach of the rules has actually taken place. The rest may be regarded as moral breaches.

- I confess to having made one take with a black drape covering a window. This is not only the addition of a property, but must also be regarded as a kind of lighting arrangement.
- I confess to moving furniture and fittings around the house.
- I confess to having taken with me a number of albums of my favourite comic book series as a youth, Linda & Valentin (Valérian and Laureline).
- I confess to helping to chase the neighbour's free-range hens across our location and including them in the film.
- I confess that I brought a photographic image from an old lady from the area and hung it in a prominent position in one scene: not as part of the plot, but more as a selfish, spontaneous, pleasureable whim.
- I confess to borrowing a hydraulic platform from a painter, which we used for the only two bird's-eye overview shots in the film.
- I do solemnly declare that in my presence the remainder of Dogme 3 – Mifune was produced in accordance with the vow of chastity.
- I also point out that the film has been approved by DOGME 95 as a Dogme film, as in real terms no more than a single breach of the rules has been committed. The rest may be regarded as moral transgressions.

== See also ==
- List of submissions to the 72nd Academy Awards for Best Foreign Language Film
- List of Danish submissions for the Academy Award for Best Foreign Language Film
