= Ronja Mannov Olesen =

Danish actress

Ronja Mannov Oleson
- Born: Copenhagen, Denmark
- Occupation: Actress

Ronja Mannov Olesen (born 5 July 1987 in Copenhagen) is a Danish actress who mainly acted in En mand kommer hjem, a Danish movie directed by Thomas Vinterberg (2007).

== Filmography ==
- Stykke for stykke (short) as Påklæder
- 2007 En mand kommer hjem (Un homme rentre chez lui, When a Man comes Home) as Maria
- 2000 Snedronningen (short) as Gerda
- 1997 Bryggeren (TV mini-series) as Store Theodora / Theodora
  - 12. afsnit, 1884-1887 (1997) ... Theodora
  - 11. afsnit, 1877-1883 (1997) ... Store Theodora (as Ronja Olesen)
