= Dear Wendy =

- Theatrical release poster
- Directed by: Thomas Vinterberg
- Written by: Lars von Trier
- Produced by: Sisse Graum Jørgensen
- Starring: Jamie Bell; Bill Pullman; Michael Angarano; Danso Gordon; Novella Nelson; Chris Owen; Alison Pill; Mark Webber
- Cinematography: Anthony Dod Mantle
- Edited by: Mikkel E. G. Nielsen
- Music by: Benjamin Wallfisch
- Production companies: Lucky Punch; Nimbus Film; Zentropa; TV2 Danmark
- Distributed by: A-Film Distribution; Wellspring Media
- Release date: 22 January 2005 (Sundance Film Festival)
- Running time: 105 minutes
- Countries: United Kingdom; Denmark; France; Germany
- Language: English
- Budget: DKK 50,000,000 (est.)

Dear Wendy is a 2005 crime film directed by Thomas Vinterberg and written by Lars von Trier. It stars Jamie Bell, Bill Pullman, Michael Angarano, Mark Webber, Danso Gordon, Novella Nelson and Alison Pill. It was an international co-production between Denmark, Germany, France, and the United Kingdom, filmed on-location in Copenhagen.

The film had its world premiere at the 2005 Sundance Film Festival. Vinterberg won the Silver St. George for Best Director at the 27th Moscow International Film Festival.

== Plot ==
In the small West Virginia mining town of Electric Park, a self-proclaimed teenage pacifist named Dick buys what he thinks is a toy gun. When he learns from a co-worker that it is not a replica, but a functioning antique gun, the two form a friendship based around recreational target shooting and studying firearms history. Other disaffected teens join them, and they begin to call themselves "the Dandies". Dick becomes more and more attached to his gun, naming it "Wendy" and writing it love letters. The Dandies adopt an affected, anachronistic style of dressing and speaking, for example replacing the word "killing" with "loving". They treat their antique firearms as elaborate props, giving them names and backstories, playing games with them, and target shooting in an abandoned mining shaft that they decorate and call the Temple. They carry their guns at all times, but make a point of never showing off their guns in public.

Dick's childhood nanny Clarabelle introduces him to her troubled grandson Sebastian, an African-American youth from out of town who is on probation for a weapons-related crime. The town's sheriff, Sheriff Krugby, appoints Dick as an informal probation officer for Sebastian, believing that Dick is a good role model. Dick allows Sebastian to break probation and asks him to join the Dandies, but only if he follows their idiosyncratic rules. One day, Sebastian gives the group a suspicious box full of guns, and soon breaks a club rule by firing another member's gun. The group's sole female member, Susan, becomes interested in Sebastian. Dick becomes upset by the changes Sebastian's presence has triggered.

Sebastian tells Dick that his grandmother is too scared of "gang violence" to walk down the street to her cousin's home, and Dick proposes that the Dandies escort her there. Clarabelle panics when they encounter a deputy sheriff and ends up shooting him after a scuffle. The sheriff asks the Dandies to hand over Clarabelle, telling them they can keep their guns if they do so. The Dandies believe that they are being set up and flee to the Temple with Clarabelle just as several other police officers arrive. Despite the fact that they are now wanted by police, the Dandies decide to finish taking Clarabelle to her cousin's, treating it as a suicide mission. Sebastian discovers Dick's final letter to Wendy, which ends with the coded threat: "And now, it's the time of the season for loving." (Note: A reference to the song "Time of the Season" by 1960s British rock band The Zombies.) Armed, they head outside to face the team of shotgun-toting police officers.

A gunfight ensues, during which most of the Dandies are killed or wounded, and Clarabelle is hit in the leg by a ricocheting bullet. Although he is also wounded, Dick manages to get Clarabelle to her cousin's house, but loses his gun Wendy in the confusion. Police officers surround the home. Sebastian, unhurt, remains hidden outside. Noticing Wendy on the street, he picks it up and runs into Clarabelle's cousin's home, where he shoots Dick with Wendy. The police on the roof across the street open fire on the building.

== Cast ==
- Jamie Bell as Dick Dandelion
- Bill Pullman as Sheriff Krugby
- Michael Angarano as Freddie
- Danso Gordon as Sebastian
- Novella Nelson as Clarabelle
- Alison Pill as Susan
- Chris Owen as Huey
- Mark Webber as Stevie
- Trevor Cooper as Dick's Dad
- William Hootkins as Marshall Walker
- Thomas Bo Larsen as Hal

== Production ==
The film was shot on a custom-built studio lot in Copenhagen, but represents a small mining town in West Virginia, USA.

== Music ==
The film is composed by The theme song for the Japanese version is "Gogo no Teikiatsu" by Remioromen.

== Reception ==
Reception to Dear Wendy was largely negative. It received an approval rating of 36% on Rotten Tomatoes based on 64 reviews and an average rating of 5.2/10. The website's critics consensus reads: "A film with numerous ideas but little grasp of how to effectively communicate them, Dear Wendy lacks the intelligence or insight that its difficult subject matter commands." Metacritic, which uses a weighted average, assigned the film a score of 33 out of 100, based on 25 critics, indicating "generally unfavorable" reviews.

Roger Ebert called it a "tedious exercise in style."
