= Robert Award for Best Long Featurette =

Danish film award

The Robert Award for Best Long Featurette was an award presented by the Danish Film Academy at the annual Robert Awards ceremony in 2002, 2003, and 2004.

== Honorees ==
- 2002: På Ama'r – Klaus Kjeldsen
- 2003: Begravelsen – Pia Bovin
- 2004: Dykkerdrengen – Morten Giese
