= Prague (2006 film) =

- Film poster
- Danish: Prag
- Directed by: Ole Christian Madsen
- Written by: Kim Fupz Aakeson; Ole Christian Madsen
- Produced by: Morten Kaufmann
- Starring: Mads Mikkelsen; Stine Stengade
- Cinematography: Jørgen Johansson
- Edited by: Søren B. Ebbe
- Music by: Jonas Struck
- Production companies: Nimbus Film; Zentropa; Sirena Film
- Distributed by: Nordisk Film
- Release date: 12 September 2006 (TIFF)
- Running time: 92 minutes
- Country: Denmark
- Language: Danish

Prague (Danish: Prag) is a 2006 Danish film written and directed by Ole Christian Madsen, starring Mads Mikkelsen, Stine Stengade and Jana Plodková.

== Plot ==
Married couple Christoffer and Maja have travelled to Prague to collect and bring home the body of Christoffer's father for burial in Denmark. When they have checked into their hotel, Christoffer visits the hospital mortuary. Having been estranged from his father since childhood, he views the corpse dispassionately and leaves with a cardboard box containing pyjamas and other possessions including a mobile phone. To Cristoffer's surprise, the phone rings and he finds himself speaking to a lawyer who is handling the estate—and who later turns out to be the father's gay lover. Returning to his hotel room, he confronts Maja with his knowledge of a clandestine affair she has been engaged in. She confesses to this but has not lost her love for her husband who, she claims, had grown apart from her.

Christoffer learns from the solicitor that most of his father's assets have been committed to outstanding debts, but that he has inherited an unencumbered house. When he goes to inspect the substantial rural cottage, he meets the beautiful young housekeeper, Alena, who lives there with a daughter and works as a nightclub singer. They soon form a rapport, despite the fact that she speaks only Czech while he is limited to Danish and English. She is unable to answer his question about exactly what business his dad was in. Before long, he learns from the lawyer that his father ran "a dating bureau for older homosexuals". As other secrets emerge, tensions build in the various characters and relationships, and are resolved in a poignant conclusion.

== Cast ==
- Mads Mikkelsen as Christoffer
- Stine Stengade as Maja
- Jana Plodková as Alena
- Bořivoj Navrátil as the lawyer
