= Bodil Special Award =

Annual Danish film award

The Bodil Special Award (Danish: Sær-Bodil, Special Bodil) is one of the awards at the annual Bodil Awards presented by the Danish Film Critics Association. While the Bodil Awards as such were established in 1948, the Special Award was first presented in 2008, and has been given annually to a person or an organization who has done something special for Danish cinema.

== Recipients ==
- 2008: Ghost Digital Production House for the effects in Island of Lost Souls
- 2009: Kåre Bjerkø for the score to What No One Knows, Terribly Happy, and Little Soldier
- 2010: Kristian Eidnes Andersen for sound design in Antichrist
- 2011: Tobias Lindholm for the scripts for R and Submarino
- 2012: Distributor Jes Graversen from Miracle Film
- 2013: Joshua Oppenheimer for the hybrid film The Act of Killing
- 2014: Copenhagen International Documentary Festival headed by Tine Fischer
- 2015: Molly Malene Stensgaard, film editor, for editing Nymphomaniac and Nymphomaniac Director's Cut
- 2016: Tonmeister Peter Albrechtsen
- 2017: Christina Rosendahl for her film work as chairman of the Danish Film Directors
- 2018: The Animation Workshop, Copenhagen Bombay, and VOID – International Animation Film Festival
- 2019: Translator Henrik Thøgersen
- 2020: Stumfilm.dk, the silent movie streaming service of the Danish Film Institute
- 2021: Director and Producer Katja Adomeit for her innovation and for bringing New Zealander Daniel Borgman, Swedish Anna Eborn, Afghan Shahrbanoo Sadat, and Danish Annika Berg to light.
