= Kalundborg Gymnasium =

School in Kalundborg, Denmark

Coordinates: 55.6817°N 11.0832°E

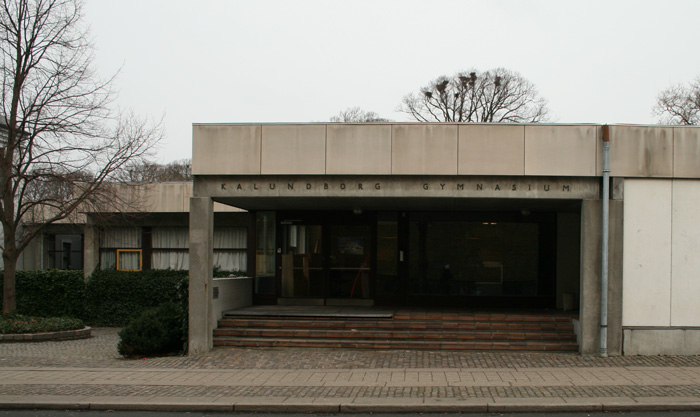

Kalundborg Gymnasium (Danish: Kalundborg Gymnasium og HF) is a municipal gymnasium in Kalundborg Municipality, Denmark. Established on 12 August 1957 as a high school, the first rector was R. Stig Hansen. As of October 2011, the rector is Peter Abildgaard Andersen, who has held the position since August 2006.

In 1963 a wing was built with new classrooms, specialist classrooms and an assembly hall, which today is the canteen. In 1976 the school was expanded with new wings containing classrooms, chemistry rooms, music rooms, a new assembly hall, auditorium, stage and library. In 2001 a new wing was added with 4 large classrooms and open study areas. In 2003 the canteen kitchen was completely renovated and in 2004 new chairs and tables were added in the cafeteria area.

The gymnasium has approximately 700 students, 24 classes and about 70 teachers. It offers degree programs in science, language, music and social studies. In the first week of October 2007, it hosted the annual Euro Week.

== Notable alumni ==
Famous alumni of Kalundborg Gymnasium include:

- Kamilla Kristensen (midfielder, handball)
- Stine Stengade (actor)
- Fallulah (singer)
- Marianne Larsen (writer)
- Milena Penkowa (neuroscientist)
- Christian E. Christiansen (director)
