= Chop Chop (2001 film) =

2001 film by Niels Arden Oplev

- Fukssvansen
- Directed by: Niels Arden Oplev
- Written by: Niels Arden Oplev; Håkan Lindhé
- Produced by: Sisse Graum Jørgensen
- Starring: Martin Buch; Anders W. Berthelsen; Sidse Babett Knudsen
- Cinematography: Lars Vestergaard
- Edited by: Søren B. Ebbe
- Music by: Jacob Groth
- Production company: Zentropa
- Distributed by: Nordisk Film
- Release date: 2 November 2001 (Denmark)
- Running time: 90 min.
- Country: Denmark
- Language: Danish

Chop Chop is a 2001 Danish comedy film. Its original Danish title is Fukssvansen, which literally means "the panel saw". Written and directed by Niels Arden Oplev, the film stars Martin Buch, Anders W. Berthelsen, and Sidse Babett Knudsen, and was produced by Zentropa.

== Plot ==
Dennis (Martin Buch) and Carl (Anders W. Berthelsen) are brothers who live on a small farm in the country side. None too bright Dennis wants a girlfriend for Christmas. Carl makes sure that Dennis gets just that when he meets Rita (Sidse Babett Knudsen) at the local pub. She is on the run from her husband and she doesn't turn down the chance to hide away at Carl and Dennis'. One festive evening, aided and abetted by Carl, Dennis and Rita, Finn who also lives at the farmhouse takes a few too many of his home-made acid toffees. And suddenly Carl and Dennis find themselves with a major problem, a girl to manage and some very inquisitive neighbours.

== Cast ==
- Martin Buch as Dennis
- Anders W. Berthelsen as Carl
- Sidse Babett Knudsen as Rita
- Tommy Kenter as Anton
- Birthe Neumann as Elly
- Thomas Bo Larsen as Finn
- Peter Aude as Erwin

== Accolades ==
At the 55th Bodil Awards, Tommy Kenter won the Best Supporting Actor award and Birthe Neumann was nominated for Best Supporting Actress. At the 2002 Robert Award ceremony, Birthe Neumann won for Best Supporting Actress and Søren Skjær won for Best Production Design, and Kristian Eidnes Andersen was nominated for Best Sound.
