= Milena Penkowa =

Danish physician and former neuroscientist

Milena Penkowa (born 1973) is a Danish neuroscientist who was a professor at the Panum Institute at the University of Copenhagen from 2009–2010. In 2010 she was convicted of fraud and embezzlement of funds from The Danish Society of Neuroscience. In the same year, she was suspended by the University of Copenhagen and consequently resigned her professorship. In 2012, the Danish Committees on Scientific Dishonesty concluded that she had been guilty of scientific misconduct. As of 2020 Penkowa has had nine of her research publications retracted, and four others have received expressions of concern.

== Academic career and scientific misconduct ==
Penkowa graduated from Kalundborg Gymnasium in 1991 and went on to study at the University of Copenhagen. She became assistant professor at the University of Copenhagen in 2000 and associate professor in 2002. Her research at Panum Institute at the University of Copenhagen from 2009–2010 mainly concerned the protein metallothionein.

In 2010 Penkowa was accused of scientific misconduct, as her graduate students were unable to replicate her previous results. Doubts arose about whether Penkowa had in fact carried out the experiments that she had reported. Penkowa was suspended from her professorship and research articles that she had authored were retracted from several journals. During the investigation, accusations of having misspent part of a 5.6 million kroner research grant were also leveled against her, and the University of Copenhagen returned 2 million kroner to the donor. Fifty-eight Danish researchers signed a letter requesting an open review of Penkowa's research, citing suspicions about data fabrication going back to 2002. Penkowa denied any wrongdoing, but resigned her professorship in December 2010.

In August 2012, an international panel investigating Penkowa's research for The University of Copenhagen reported "no doubt that there is justified suspicion of deliberate scientific malpractice in 15 of Penkowa’s articles." Penkowa responded: "No-one is perfect, not even me, and there is no doubt that unforeseen errors could have been committed since I started working in a laboratory in 1993 and for that I apologise deeply. 'Deliberate malpractice' is another matter and something I have never done. I therefore do not think it is reasonable to infer that my research has been fraudulent as the press is doing these days." In September 2017, the University of Copenhagen stripped Penkowa of her doctoral degree, after determining she had covered up her scientific misconduct.

== See also ==
- List of scientific misconduct incidents
