= 20th Robert Awards =

2003 Danish film awards ceremony

- Date: 2 February 2003
- Organized by: Danish Film Academy

The 20th Robert Awards ceremony was held on 2 February 2003 in Copenhagen, Denmark. Organized by the Danish Film Academy, the awards honoured the best in Danish and foreign film of 2002.

== Honorees ==
=== Best Danish Film ===
- Open Hearts – Susanne Bier

=== Best Children's Film ===
- Klatretøsen – Hans Fabian Wullenweber

=== Best Director ===
- Nils Malmros – Facing the Truth

=== Best Screenplay ===
- Nils Malmros & John Mogensen – Facing the Truth

=== Best Actor in a Leading Role ===
- Jens Albinus – Facing the Truth

=== Best Actress in a Leading Role ===
- Paprika Steen – Okay

=== Best Actor in a Supporting Role ===
- Nikolaj Lie Kaas – Open Hearts

=== Best Actress in a Supporting Role ===
- Paprika Steen – Open Hearts

=== Best Cinematography ===
- Dan Laustsen – I Am Dina

=== Production Design ===
- Steffen Aarfing & Marie í Dali – I Am Dina

=== Best Costume Design ===
- Dominique Borg – I Am Dina

=== Makeup ===
- June Pålgard & Elisabeth Bukkehave – I Am Dina

=== Best Special Effects ===
- Jonas Wagner, Morten Lynge, Niels Valentin Dal & Hummer Højmark – Klatretøsen

=== Best Sound Design ===
- Michael Dela & Nino Jacobsen – I Am Dina

=== Best Editing ===
- Pernille Bech Christensen & Thomas Krag – Open Hearts

=== Best Score ===
- Halfdan E. – Okay

=== Best Song ===
- Nikolaj Steen – Okay

=== Best Documentary Short ===
- Palle Nielsen – Mig skal intet Fattes – Jytte Rex

=== Best Documentary Feature ===
- Angels of Brooklyn – Camilla Hjelm Knudsen & Martin Zandvliet

=== Best Short Featurette ===
- Habibti – Min elskede – Pernille Fischer Christensen

=== Best Long Featurette ===
- Begravelsen – Pia Bovin

=== Best Non-American Film ===
- Amélie – Jean-Pierre Jeunet

=== Best American Film ===
- Gosford Park – Robert Altman

=== Audience Award ===
- Open Hearts

== See also ==
- 2003 Bodil Awards
