= Kathrine Windfeld =

Danish film and television director

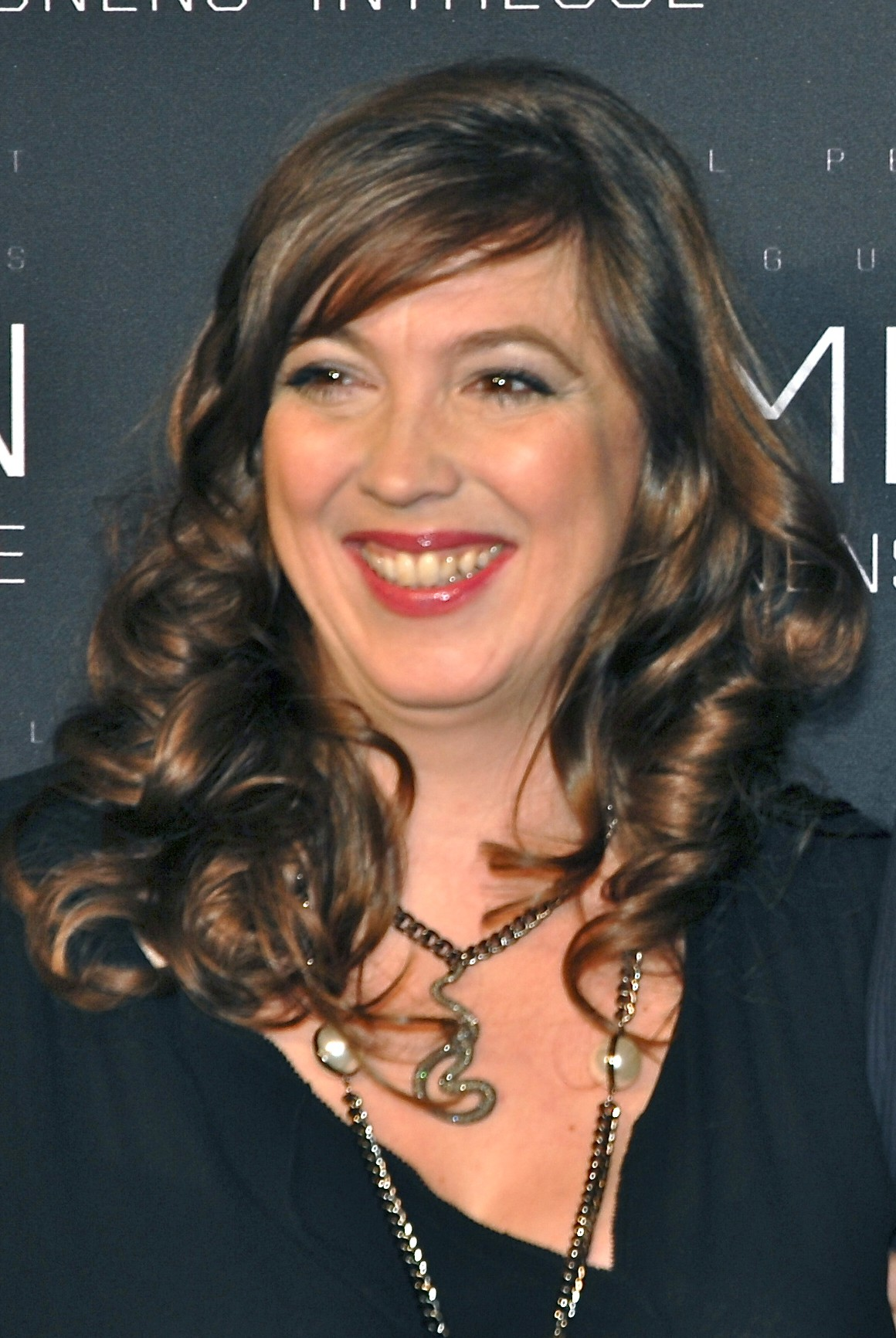
- Windfeld in 2012
- Born: 21 August 1966; Copenhagen, Denmark
- Died: 6 February 2015 (aged 48)
- Occupations: Film and television director

Kathrine Windfeld (21 August 1966 – 6 February 2015) was a Danish film and television director. She is known for the 2012 Swedish spy film Hamilton: In the Interest of the Nation. As a television director she is credited with episodes of Wallander, The Killing, Rita and The Bridge.

== Personal life ==
Windfeld died on 6 February 2015 after a short illness. Windfeld suffered from a brain tumour. She was 48 years old.

== Filmography ==
Work	Year	Credit	Notes
The Killing III	2012	Direction	TV series
Hamilton: In the Interest of the Nation	2012	Direction	Feature
The Escape	2009	Direction	Feature
Park Road	2009	Director: 2. unit	TV series
Sommer	2008	Direction	TV series
Angels in Fast Motion	2005	Assistant director	Feature
Min søn, min mand, min far	2002	Direction	Documentary
Min...	2002	Direction	Anthology
Little Man	2002	Direction	Short fiction
Rejseholdet	2000	Assistant director	TV series
The Spider (TV series)	2000	Assistant director	TV series
You Can't Eat Fishing	1999	Direction	Short fiction
