= Manderlay =

- Theatrical release poster
- Directed by: Lars von Trier
- Written by: Lars von Trier
- Produced by: Vibeke Windeløv
- Starring: Bryce Dallas Howard; Willem Dafoe; Danny Glover; Lauren Bacall; Jean-Marc Barr; Udo Kier
- Narrated by: John Hurt
- Cinematography: Anthony Dod Mantle
- Edited by: Molly Marlene Stensgård
- Music by: Joachim Holbek
- Production companies: Zentropa Entertainments13 ApS; Canal+; SigmaIII Films Ltd.; Arte France Cinéma
- Distributed by: Distributionsselskabet (Denmark); Nordisk Film (Denmark; through Nordisk-Constantin-Fox); Sony Pictures Releasing (Sweden); A-Film Distribution (Netherlands); Les Films du Losange (France); Neue Visionen (Germany); Metrodome Distribution (United Kingdom); 01 Distribution (Italy)
- Release dates: 16 May 2005 (Cannes); 3 June 2005 (Denmark)
- Running time: 138 minutes
- Countries: Denmark; Sweden; Netherlands; France; Germany; United Kingdom; Italy
- Language: English
- Budget: $14.2 million
- Box office: $675,000

Manderlay is a 2005 drama film written and directed by Lars von Trier, the second part of Trier's projected USA: Land of Opportunities trilogy. Unlike Trier's other trilogies, the films' stories are connected and it is a direct sequel to Dogville. It stars Bryce Dallas Howard, who replaces Nicole Kidman in the role of Grace Mulligan. The film co-stars Willem Dafoe, replacing James Caan. Lauren Bacall, Željko Ivanek, Jeremy Davies, and Chloë Sevigny return portraying different characters from those in Dogville. Only John Hurt, Udo Kier, and Jean-Marc Barr reprise their roles. The film was internationally co-produced with seven different European countries.

The staging is very similar to Dogville, which was shot on a sparsely dressed sound stage akin to black box theater. As in the case of Dogville, Manderlay's action is confined to a small geographic area, in this case a plantation. The film is dedicated to the memory of a French film producer, Humbert Balsan (1954-2005).

== Plot ==
The film is told in eight straight chapters:

1. In which we happen upon Manderlay and meet the people there
2. "The freed enterprise of Manderlay"
3. "The Old Lady's Garden"
4. In which Grace means business
5. "Shoulder to Shoulder"
6. Hard times at Manderlay
7. "Harvest"
8. In which Grace settles with Manderlay and the film ends

Set in 1933, the film takes up the story of Grace and her father after burning the town of Dogville at the end of the previous film. Grace and her father travel in convoy with a number of gunmen through rural Alabama where they stop briefly outside a plantation called Manderlay. As the gangsters converse, a Black woman emerges from Manderlay's front gates complaining that someone is about to be whipped for stealing a bottle of wine.

Grace enters the plantation and learns that within it, slavery persists, roughly 70 years after the American Civil War and the Emancipation Proclamation. Grace is appalled and insists on staying at the plantation with a small contingent of gunmen and her father's lawyer, Joseph, in order to guarantee the slaves' safe transition to freedom. Shortly after Grace's father and the remaining gangsters depart, Mam, the master of the house, dies, but not before asking Grace to burn a notebook containing "Mam's Law," an exhaustive code of conduct for the entire plantation and all its inhabitants, free and slave. She reads the descriptions of each variety of slave that can be encountered, which include:

- Group 1: Proudy Nigger
- Group 2: Talkin' Nigger
- Group 3: Weepin' Nigger
- Group 4: Hittin' Nigger
- Group 5: Clownin' Nigger
- Group 6: Losin' Nigger
- Group 7: Pleasin' Nigger (also known as a chameleon, a person of the kind who can transform himself into exactly the type the beholder would like to see)

The principal seven divisions are each populated by a single adult slave at Manderlay, who congregate daily and converse on a "parade ground," with Roman numerals of the numbers 1 through 7 designating where each slave stands. "Mam's Law" contains further provisions against the use of cash by slaves, or the felling of trees on the property for timber.

All of this information disgusts Grace and inspires her to take charge of the plantation in order to punish the slave owners and prepare the slaves for life as free individuals. In order to guarantee that the former slaves will not continue to be exploited, no longer as slaves but instead as sharecroppers, Grace orders Joseph to draw up contracts for all Manderlay's inhabitants, institutionalizing a form of cooperative living in which the white family works as slaves and the blacks collectively own the plantation and its crops. Throughout this process, Grace lectures all those present about the notions of freedom and democracy, using rhetoric entirely in keeping with the ideology of racial equality which most contemporary Americans had yet to embrace.

However, Grace fails to embed these principles in Manderlay's community in a form she considers satisfactory. Furthermore, her suggestions for improving the conditions of the community backfire on several occasions, such as using the surrounding trees for timber, which leaves the crops vulnerable to dust storms. After a year of such tribulations, the community harvests its cotton and successfully sells it, marking the high point of Grace's involvement. Subsequently, she un-enthusiastically has sex with Timothy, who also steals and gambles away all of the cotton profits. Finally acknowledging her failure, Grace contacts her father and attempts to leave the plantation only to be stopped by the inhabitants. It is then revealed that "Mam's Law" was not conceived and enforced by Mam or any of the other whites, but instead by Wilhelm, the community's eldest member, as a means of maintaining the status quo after the abolition of slavery, protecting the slaves and their descendants from a hostile outside world unready and unwilling to acknowledge them. The people of Manderlay then tell Grace, as the newly elected "Mam", to punish Timothy for what he did by whipping him. Grace, hoping the approaching gangsters will do to Manderlay as they did Dogville, then finds a letter from her father, explaining that he came to get her while she was whipping Timothy and, assuming that this was what she meant by claiming that Manderlay had come upon new times and that she had accepted them as slaves, left. Grace then runs away to another unrevealed place. As in many Trier films, the idealistic main character becomes frustrated by the reality he or she encounters.

== Cast ==
- Bryce Dallas Howard as Grace Margaret Mulligan
- Willem Dafoe as Mr. Mulligan
- Danny Glover as Wilhelm
- Lauren Bacall as Mam
- Jean-Marc Barr as Mr. Robinson
- Udo Kier as Mr. Kirspe
- Isaach de Bankolé as Timothy
- Michaël Abiteboul as Thomas
- Geoffrey Bateman as Bertie
- Virgile Bramly as Edward
- Ruben Brinkman as "Bingo"
- Doña Croll as Venus
- Jeremy Davies as Niels
- Llewella Gideon as Victoria
- Mona Hammond as Old Wilma
- Ginny Holder as Elizabeth
- Emmanuel Idowu as Jim
- Željko Ivanek as Dr. Hector
- Teddy Kempner as Joseph
- Rik Launspach as Stanley Mays
- Suzette Llewellyn as Flora
- Charles Maquignon as Bruno
- Joseph Mydell as Mark
- Javone Prince as Jack
- Clive Rowe as Sammy
- Chloë Sevigny as Philomena
- Nina Sosanya as Rose
- John Hurt as The Narrator

== Production ==
Nicole Kidman and James Caan, who had appeared in Dogville, the first film of the USA: Land of Opportunities series, did not return for this film; Kidman was unable to return due to scheduling conflicts, while Caan disapproved of the film's depiction of anti-American culture and slavery.

Fearful about her sex scene, Bryce Dallas Howard said she approached it in a hypnotic state. After the first take, she excused herself and went to the bathroom to collect her thoughts, then started to think of it as a sort of comedic scene. "Just in my head. And interestingly enough, Lars kind of felt that. The scene wasn't written funny at all, but there are some really eccentric and absurd moments in that scene that people tend to chuckle at."

=== Donkey killing ===
During production, a donkey was slaughtered for dramatic purposes resulting in John C. Reilly, the actor originally cast as Dr. Hector, quitting in protest. The scene was cut from the film before it was released.

== Reception ==
=== Critical reception ===
Manderlay received mixed reviews from critics. As of March 2022, the film holds a 50% approval rating on review aggregation site Rotten Tomatoes, based on 104 reviews with an average rating of 5.70/10. The website's critics consensus reads: "Manderlay may work better as a political statement than as a film, making its points at the expense of telling a compelling story." On Metacritic, the film has a weighted average score of 46 out of 100, based on 29 critics, indicating "mixed or average reviews".

Anthony Lane of The New Yorker said Trier "is not so much a filmmaker as a misanthropic mesmerist, who uses movies to bend the viewer to his humorless will," while Josh Kun of the Los Angeles Times added, "Trier gets lost in his own rhetoric."

Conversely, The Guardian film critic Peter Bradshaw and Roger Ebert both gave the film positive reviews. While noting, "Many moviegoers are likely to like the film less than the discussion it drags them into," Ebert opined, "The crucial difference between Manderlay and the almost unbearable Dogville is not that [Trier's] politics have changed, but that his sense of mercy for the audience has been awakened." Peter Bradshaw claimed that Manderlay "is a wind-up, but an effective wind-up," and wrote of Trier's Land of Opportunities trilogy, "My guess is you can throw away the first and third movies and keep this one."

=== Box office ===
The film took a total of $674,918 from 12 countries.

=== Accolades ===
Manderlay was entered into the 2005 Cannes Film Festival.

== Soundtrack ==
The Manderlay soundtrack, including songs from the film Dogville, was arranged by composer Joachim Holbek, and released through Milan Records.

1. "Dogville Overture" – (Vivaldi Concert in G Major)
2. "Thoughts of Tom" – (Handel Concerto Grosso in D Major)
3. "Happy at Work" – (Oboe Concerto Albinoni Concerto For Oboe in D Minor)
4. "Dogville Theme" – (Vivaldi Concert in G Major)
5. "The Gifts" – (Flute And Cembalo Vivaldi Concerto For Flute in D Minor)
6. "Happy Times in Dogville" – (Albinoni Concerto For Oboe in D Minor)
7. "Fast Motion" – (Vivaldi Concert in G Major)
8. "The Fog" – (Vivaldi "Madrigalesco" RV 139)
9. "Grace Gets Angry" – (Vivaldi "Nisi Dominus" RV 608)
10. "Change of Time" – (Pergolesi "Stabat Mater")
11. "Manderlay Theme" – (Vivaldi Concerto For Basson in a Minor)
12. "Mam's Death" – (Vivaldi Concert in G Minor)
13. "The Child" – (Vivaldi "Al Santo Sepolcro" and Pergolesi "Quando Corpus Morietur")
14. "The Swallows Arrive" – (Handel Aria)
15. "Young Americans" – David Bowie

== See also ==
- List of films featuring slavery
