= Stine Stengade =

Danish actress

- Born: 1 June 1972 (age 54); Copenhagen, Denmark
- Occupation: Actress
- Years active: 1996–present
- Awards: Bodil 2001 *Robert (2001)

Stine Stengade (born 1 June 1972) is a Danish actress best known for her leading role in the 2001 Dogme 95 film Kira's Reason: A Love Story (Original title: En Kærlighedshistorie).

== Biography ==
Stine Stengade was born in Copenhagen on 1 June 1972. She attended Kalundborg Gymnasium and graduated from the Danish National School of Theater in 1998. Stengade debuted on screen in the 1996 film Den Attende. In 2000 she achieved notoriety in Denmark as the femme fatale Lisbeth Gordon in the popular Danish television crime series Edderkoppen. The following year she played the leading role in the award-winning Dogme 95 film Kira's Reason: A Love Story. For her performance Stengade received both the Bodil Award and the Robert Award for Best Actress of 2001. Stengade has appeared in several television series including Rejseholdet and Langt fra Las Vegas. She performed in the popular film Nynne (2006) and was again nominated for the Bodil Award as Best Actress for her role in the dramatic film Prag.

== Personal life ==
Stengade divorced her first husband, then lived together with the Danish film director Ole Christian Madsen, who directed her in Kira's Reason (Danish: En Kærlighedshistorie), a film which explores a difficult marital break-up.

== Filmography ==
=== Actress ===
- Matters of the Heart (2024) as Helen
- Dicte .... Nina Storm (10 episodes, 2016)
- Kapgang (2014)
- Above Suspicion (Series 3) (2011)
- Room 304 (2011)
- Those Who Kill (2011) .... Andrea Lorck
- Borgen (2010) .... Henriette Klitgaard
- Den du frygter (2008) .... Ellen... a.k.a. Fear Me Not (International: English title)
- Spillets regler (2008)... a.k.a. Moving Up (International: English title)
- Flammen & Citronen (2008) .... Ketty ... a.k.a. The Flame and the Lemon (USA title)
- Daisy Diamond (2007) .... Casting director
- Forsvunden (2006) .... Mia... a.k.a. Embrace Me (International: English title)
- Prag .... Maja... a.k.a. Prague (International: English title)
- Nynne (2005) .... Natasha
- Glashus (2005)
- Forsvar .... Ellen Brahe (4 episodes, 2004)... a.k.a. Defense (English title)
- Helligtrekongersaften (2004) (TV) .... Viola
- The Fairytaler .... Additional Voices (3 episodes, 2004)
- Se dagens lys (2003) (TV) .... Blå Kollega
- Annas dag (2003) .... Maria
- Rejseholdet.... Miriam (1 episode, 2002)... a.k.a. Unit One (English title)
- En Kærlighedshistorie (2001) .... Kira... a.k.a. Kira's Reason: A Love Story
- Langt fra Las Vegas .... Anne (3 episodes, 2001)
- Edderkoppen (2000) TV mini-series .... Lisbeth Gordan
- Zacharias Carl Borg (2000) .... Anna
- Attende, Den (1996) .... Pia ... a.k.a. The Eighteens

=== Self ===
- Meyerheim .... Herself (1 episode, 2007)
- Vild med dans (2005) TV series .... Herself – Participant (season 1)
- Bodilprisen 2005 (2005) (TV) .... Herself
- Bag kameraet: En kærlighedshistorie (2002) (V) (uncredited) .... Herself/Kira
