= It's All About Love =

- Directed by: Thomas Vinterberg
- Written by: Thomas Vinterberg; Mogens Rukov
- Starring: Joaquin Phoenix; Sean Penn; Claire Danes
- Cinematography: Anthony Dod Mantle
- Edited by: Valdís Óskarsdóttir
- Music by: Zbigniew Preisner
- Production company: Nimbus Film
- Release date: 10 January 2003
- Running time: 106 minutes
- Country: Denmark
- Language: English
- Budget: $10,000,000
- Box office: $478,996

It's All About Love is a 2003 English-language Danish romance-drama film written and directed by Thomas Vinterberg. Its narrative can be classified as apocalyptic science fiction, but Vinterberg prefers to call it "a dream". Unlike the director's earlier Danish-language films, It's All About Love is entirely in English, and stars Joaquin Phoenix, Claire Danes and Sean Penn. The production was led by Denmark's Nimbus Film, but the film was largely an international co-production, with involvement of companies from nine countries. It was very poorly received by film critics.

== Plot ==
In the year 2021, when the Earth experiences continuous climate changes with sudden waves of frost and snow in the summer, John, a university lecturer traveling from Poland to Calgary, stops in New York to sign divorce papers for his wife Elena. A figure skating champion, Elena is followed by a large entourage that takes care of her numerous commitments and all external relations.

John is detained one night in order to attend an important performance by Elena. Set to leave the next morning, he finds that not only has Elena not signed the divorce papers but, with very little explanation, she begs John for help. Still in love, he indulges her. John discovers that Elena is the victim of a strange plot hatched by her own entourage. Three clones, perfectly identical to her, were made to replace her. The official explanation is to relieve her of the burden of an activity that is getting more difficult over time, but the fear is that once the clone training is over, the real Elena can be put aside.

Amid escapes and returns, the killing of the clones, the betrayal of his own family members, John and Elena go away first by train then on foot towards a safe place to resume a new life together, but in the end, they face the cold storms that are ravaging much of the Earth, and die, embraced.

The narration of the finale is entrusted to Marciello, John's brother, who in flight over the planet is one of the last survivors but is also destined to perish as it is not possible to land.

== Cast ==
- Joaquin Phoenix as John
- Claire Danes as Elena
- Sean Penn as Marciello
- Douglas Henshall as Michael
- Alun Armstrong as David
- Margo Martindale as Betsy
- Mark Strong as Arthur
- Geoffrey Hutchings as Mr. Morrison

== Production ==
The film was written, directed, and produced by Thomas Vinterberg over a period of five years. It was produced through Nimbus Film.

At a certain point during production Vinterberg called up Ingmar Bergman and asked him to come and help him finish the film, as he felt he could not complete it himself. Vinterberg recalled that:

He roared with laughter and said I had to be out of my mind. There was nothing he was less interested in. And he also said I was an idiot that had not decided fast enough what to do after The Celebration (Festen), which he, by the way, called a masterpiece. It was a very contended conversation.

(From an interview in Berlingske Tidende.)

== Reception ==
The film was not very successful, and critics mostly panned it. On the review aggregator website Rotten Tomatoes, 19% of 31 critics' reviews are positive, with an average rating of 3.9/10. The website's consensus reads: "It's All About Love has ambitious ideas and an impressive cast, none of which are put to compelling use in this dramatically inert and narratively incoherent sci-fi drama." Metacritic, which uses a weighted average, assigned the film a score of 32 out of 100, based on 9 critics, indicating "generally unfavorable" reviews. Richard Roeper called the film "like Kubrick with a talent-ectomy", while Jack Matthews of the New York Daily News declared that "Surely, Vinterberg was high on some inert gas when he embarked on it". Dennis Lim of the Village Voice, however found something to like in the film:

It's All About Love is, by any measure, a colossal folly – ridiculed at its Sundance '03 premier, supposedly disowned by its stars (rumor has it Claire Danes burst into tears upon seeing the end result) and jettisoned by original distributor Focus. But this $10 million Danish-British-French-U.S.-Japanese-Swedish-Norwegian-German-Dutch co-production is a film maudit for the ages — rapturous and inexplicable in equal measure.
