= Robert Audience Award =

Danish film award

- Description: Honoring the most popular film as voted by the public
- Country: Denmark
- Presented by: Danish Film Academy
- Website: www.robertprisen.dk

The Robert Audience Award (Danish: Robert publikumsprisen) is one of the external awards presented occasionally by the Danish Film Academy at the annual Robert Awards ceremony. The award was first given in 1999.

== Honorees ==
- 15th Robert Awards, 1999: Flickering Lights
- 18th Robert Awards, 2002: Shake It All About
- 19th Robert Awards, 2003: Open Hearts
- 20th Robert Awards, 2004: The Inheritance
- 21st Robert Awards, 2005]: Terkel in Trouble
- 25th Robert Awards, 2009: Take the Trash Out
- 26th Robert Awards, 2010: Sorte kugler
- 27th Robert Awards, 2011: Klown
- 28th Robert Awards, 2012: Alle for en – as Yousee Publikumsprisen
- 29th Robert Awards, 2013:
  - Hvidsten gruppen – as YouBio Publikumsprisen – Drama (drama)
  - Love Is All You Need – as YouBio Publikumsprisen – Komedie (comedy)
  - Max Pinlig 3 på Roskilde – as YouBio Publikumsprisen – Børne- og Ungdomsfilm (children and teen)
  - Forbrydelsen 3 – as YouBio Publikumsprisen – TV-serie (TV series)
- 2014:
  - Alle for to – as YouSee Publikumsprisen – Komedie (comedy)
  - The Hunt – as YouSee Publikumsprisen – Drama (drama)
- 2015: The Absent One – as Blockbuster Publikumsprisen
- 2016: Land of Mine
- 2017: En-to-tre-nu!
- 2018: Alle for tre
