= Nordkraft (film) =

- Theatrical poster
- Directed by: Ole Christian Madsen
- Starring: Thure Lindhardt; Signe Egholm Olsen; Claus Riis Østergaard; Farshad Kholghi
- Production company: Nimbus Film
- Distributed by: Nordisk Film
- Release date: 4 March 2005 (Denmark)
- Running time: 120 min.
- Country: Denmark
- Language: Danish

Nordkraft (also released as Angels in Fast Motion) is a 2005 Danish drama film, based on the book of the same title by Jakob Ejersbo and written and directed by Ole Christian Madsen, with Kathrine Windfeld as assistant director. The soundtrack includes the track "Rest" from the album All Things to All People.

== Cast ==
- Thure Lindhardt – Steso
- Signe Egholm Olsen – Maria
- Claus Riis Østergaard – Allan
- Farshad Kholghi – Hossein
- Thomas L. Corneliussen – Asger
- Pernille Vallentin Brandt – Tilde
- Signe Vaupel – Maja
- Rudi Køhnke – Frank
- Joachim Malling – Michael
- Finn Storgaard – Hans Jørgen
- Maria Stenz – Maria's mother
- Kirsten Norholt – Allan's mother
- Søs Egelind – Steso's mother
- Lars Mikkelsen – Steso's father
- Nanna Berg – Nadia
- Ulver Skuli Abildgaard – Bjarne
- Paw Henriksen – Rocker
- Barbara Hesselager – Frank's girlfriend
- Mark Hoppe – Running man
- Rasmus Møller Lauritsen – Junkie
- Nils P. Munk – Aksel
- Priscilla Rasmussen – Mette
- Stanislav Sevcik

== Awards and nominations ==
Thure Lindhardt won the 2006 Robert Award for Best Actor in a Supporting Role for his role as Steso. It also won the 2006 Robert awards for Best Sound Design, Best Makeup, Best Production Design and Best Song and a nomination for the 2006 Bodil Award for Best Actor in a Leading Role.
