= American Sausage Standoff =

- Poster
- Directed by: Ulrich Thomsen
- Written by: Ulrich Thomsen
- Starring: Antony Starr; Ewen Bremner
- Distributed by: Samuel Goldwyn Films
- Release date: 27 August 2021 (United States)
- Running time: 107 minutes
- Country: Denmark
- Language: English

American Sausage Standoff (formerly titled Gutterbee) is a 2021 Danish comedy-drama film written and directed by Ulrich Thomsen and starring Antony Starr and Ewen Bremner.

== Cast ==
- Antony Starr as Mike Dankworth McCoid
- Ewen Bremner as Edward Hofler
- W. Earl Brown as Jimmy Jerry Lee Jones Jr.
- Joshua Harto as Hank
- Clark Middleton as Luke Kenneth Hosewall
- Chance Kelly as Sheriff T.J. Brown

== Release ==
In June 2021, it was announced that Samuel Goldwyn Films acquired U.S. distribution rights to the film. It was released on 27 August 2021.

== Reception ==
The film has a 36% rating on Rotten Tomatoes based on 11 reviews.

Glenn Kenny of The New York Times gave the film a negative review and wrote, "...the end product of this dismal film is mostly befuddlement."

Demetrios Matheou of Screen International also gave the film a negative review and wrote, "...its combination of extremely eccentric comedy and bigotry-themed drama would be challenging at the best of times; and Thomsen doesn’t exercise enough finesse or restraint to pull it off."
