= Thomas Bo Larsen =

Danish actor (born 1963)

- Born: 27 November 1963 (age 62); Gladsaxe, Denmark
- Occupation: Actor
- Years active: 1984–present

Thomas Bo Larsen (born 27 November 1963) is a Danish actor. He is known for his appearance in several films by Thomas Vinterberg, including The Celebration (1998), The Hunt (2012), Another Round (2020), and the 2024 TV series Families like Ours.

== Early life ==
Larsen began acting on stage at age 11 at Bagsværd Amatørscene, in Gladsaxe. Following the insistence of his parents, he spent 12 years working as a craftsman, including work as a baker and glazier. He later graduated from Odense Theatre School in 1991 at the age of 28.

== Career ==
Larsen was nominated for a Bodil Award in 1995 for Best Supporting Actor in Sidste time, and later won two Robert Awards, the first in 1996 for Best Actor in The Biggest Heroes, and a second one in 1998 for Best Supporting Actor for his role in The Celebration by Thomas Vinterberg. He has appeared in several other Vinterberg films, including in the role of Tommy in Another Round (2020) and as Holger in his TV series Families like Ours (2024).

In 2017, Larsen was in Veni Vidi Vici. He played Thomas Waldman in the Swedish–Danish thriller series Advokaten (2018). He has also worked as a stage actor, having appearing in about 150 theatre productions as of 2023. In 2024, he appeared in the comedy film Jönssonligan kommer tillbaka as Dr. Dino, a paleontologist.

== Personal life ==
Larsen dealt with alcoholism from the age of 13, which later led to substance abuse. In 2013, he joined Alcoholics Anonymous. As of 2023, he remains actively involved with AA.

== Selected filmography ==
- The Biggest Heroes (1996), Karsten
- Pusher (1996), drug addict
- The Celebration (1998), Michael
- Flickering Lights (2000), Burglar
- Ambulance (2005)
- The Hunt (2012), Theo
- A Second Chance (2014), Klaus
- The Wave (2015), Phillip Poulsen
- Veni Vidi Vici (2017)
- Advokaten (2018), Thomas Waldman
- Another Round (2020), Tommy
- Families like Ours (2024), Holger
