= Kira's Reason: A Love Story =

2001 film by Ole Christian Madsen

- Front cover of the DVD
- Directed by: Ole Christian Madsen
- Written by: Ole Christian Madsen; Mogens Rukov
- Produced by: Bo Ehrhardt; Morten Kaufmann
- Starring: Stine Stengade; Lars Mikkelsen
- Cinematography: Jørgen Johanssen
- Edited by: Søren B. Ebbe
- Music by: Øyvind Ougard; Cesar Berti
- Distributed by: Nimbus Film
- Release date: 26 October 2001
- Running time: 93 min.
- Country: Denmark
- Language: Danish

Kira's Reason: A Love Story (Danish: En Kærlighedshistorie, lit. 'a love story') is a 2001 Danish drama directed by Ole Christian Madsen and written by Madsen and Mogens Rukov. The film stars Stine Stengade in a character study of a young mother who, released after two years in a psychiatric ward, struggles to hold her marriage, family and life intact. Filmed using the minimalist techniques of the Dogme 95 movement, Kira's Reason is also known as Dogme No. 21. Kira's Reason won both the Bodil and Robert Awards as the Best Danish Film of 2001. For her leading performance, Stengade received the Bodil and Robert awards for Best Actress.

== Cast ==
Actor	Role
Stine Stengade	Kira
Lars Mikkelsen	Mads
Sven Wollter	Kira's Father
Peaches Latrice Petersen	Kay
Camilla Bendix	Charlotte
Lotte Bergstrøm	Michelle
Thomas W. Gabrielsson	Gustav
Ronnie Lorenzen	Mikkel (as Ronnie Hiort Lorenzen)
Oliver Appelt Nielsen	Julius
Klaus Pagh	Mads' Boss
Claus Strandberg	1st Supplier
Henrik Birch	2nd Supplier
Michael Hasselflug	3rd Supplier
Helle Merete Sørensen	Wife of 1st Supplier
Nicolas Bro	John

== Reception ==
On the review aggregator website Rotten Tomatoes, 67% of 18 critics' reviews are positive.
