= A Man Comes Home =

- Directed by: Thomas Vinterberg
- Written by: Mogens Rukov; Thomas Vinterberg
- Starring: Oliver Møller-Knauer; Ronja Mannov Olesen
- Distributed by: Zentropa
- Release date: 14 September 2007
- Running time: 1h 40min
- Countries: Denmark; Sweden
- Language: Danish
- Budget: 400.000 US$ (estimated)

A Man Comes Home (Danish: En mand kommer hjem) is a 2007 Danish comedy film directed by Thomas Vinterberg.

== Cast ==
- Oliver Møller-Knauer - Sebastian
- Ronja Mannov Olesen - Maria
- Helene Reingaard Neumann - Claudia
- Thomas Bo Larsen - Hans Kristian Schmidt
- Gitte Christensen - Sarah Schmidt
- Morten Grunwald - Direktøren
- Karen-Lise Mynster - Sebastians mor
- Ulla Henningsen - Onkel Anna
- Shanti Roney - Kokken
- Paw Henriksen - Peter
- Morten Schaffalitzky - Peters bror
- Christopher Læssø - Opvasker
- Nicolaj Kopernikus - Sebastians far
