= The Escape (2009 film) =

- Danish: Flugten
- Directed by: Kathrine Windfeld
- Starring: Iben Hjejle; Lars Mikkelsen
- Release date: 9 January 2009
- Running time: 114 minutes
- Country: Denmark
- Language: Danish

The Escape (Danish: Flugten) is a 2009 Danish drama film directed by Kathrine Windfeld.

== Cast ==
- Iben Hjejle - Rikke Lyngvig
- Lars Mikkelsen - Thomas Jargil
- Henrik Prip - Arne Hansen
- Sonja Richter - Sara Jargil
- Vibeke Hastrup - Hanne Hvidtfeldt
- Søren Spanning - Jesper Bech
- Mikael Birkkjær - Claes Kielland
- Søren Sætter-Lassen - Steffensen
- Faegh Zamani - Nazir Osmani
