= Mogens Rukov =

Danish screenwriter and playwright

- Born: 4 August 1943; Holstebro, Denmark
- Died: 18 December 2015 (aged 72)
- Other names: Mogens Rukow
- Awards: Nordisk Film Award, 2002

Mogens Rukov (4 August 1943 – 18 December 2015) was a Danish screenwriter and playwright. He achieved a university degree in Nordic philology and film in 1974. He taught in the screenwriting department at the National Film School of Denmark, Copenhagen.

His efforts to shape new generations of Danish screenwriters were much-respected. He wrote or co-wrote several screenplays and functioned as a consultant on numerous films.

== Filmography (selected) ==
- The Element of Crime (1984) (consultant: scenario)
- Elise (1985) (writer)
- Space Wreck 1998 (International: English title)
- The Celebration a.k.a. Dogme #1, 1998 (screenplay)
- The Idiots a.k.a. Dogme #2 (1998) (script consultant)
- The Third Lie (2000) (writer)
- Kira's Reason: A Love Story a.k.a. Dogme #21 (2001) (screenplay in cooperation)
- It's All About Love (2003) (writer)
- Inheritance (2003) (screenplay)
- Reconstruction (writer)
- Purpose of Visit (2004) (writer)
- The Jewish Toy Merchant (2005) (writer)
- Manslaughter (2005) (writer)
- 42 plus (2007) (writer)
- A Man Comes Home (2007) (writer)
- Go With Peace, Jamil (2008) (co-writer)
- Comeback (2008) (dramaturgist)
- Everything Is Relative (2008) (writer)
- The Mire Archive (Eclectic Films UK) (2013) (script consultant)
