= Valdís Óskarsdóttir =

Icelandic film editor (born 1949)

- Born: Valdís Björk Óskarsdóttir; 6 May 1949 (age 77); Akureyri, Iceland
- Occupations: Film editor; director
- Years active: 1992–present

Valdís Óskarsdóttir (born 6 May 1949) is an Icelandic film editor, whose work includes The Celebration, Les Misérables, Finding Forrester and Eternal Sunshine of the Spotless Mind.

She received multiple awards in early 2005 for her work on Eternal Sunshine of the Spotless Mind. In addition, she has twice won the Danish Film Academy's Robert Award for Best Editing.

Sveitabrúðkaup (English: Country Wedding), her directorial debut, premiered in Iceland in August 2008.

== Filmography ==
Valdís was the primary editor on the following films, unless noted otherwise.

- Remote Control (Sódóma Reykjavík) (1992)
- The Biggest Heroes (De største helte) (1996)
- Dream Hunters (Draumadísir) (1996)
- The Last Viking (Den sidste viking) (1997)
- The Dance (Dansinn) (1998)
- The Celebration (Festen) (1998)
- Les Misérables (1998) (additional editor)
- Julien Donkey-Boy (1999)
- Mifune's Last Song (Mifunes sidste sang) (1999)
- Finding Forrester (2000)
- Labyrinth (Labyrinten) (2000) (miniseries)
- When the Sun Goes Down (Solen er så rød) (2000)
- Bear's Kiss (2002) (consulting editor)
- The Sea (Hafið) (2002)
- Sweet Dreams (Skagerrak) (2003)
- It's All About Love (2003)
- Toss-Up (Yazi tura) (2004) (with Uğur Yücel)
- Eternal Sunshine of the Spotless Mind (2004)
- Mister Lonely (2005)
- Overcoming (2005)
- A Man Comes Home (En mand kommer hjem) (2007)
- Mongol (Монгол) (2007) (with Zach Staenberg)
- Country Wedding (Sveitabrúðkaup) (2008) (also director and screenwriter)
- Vantage Point (2008) (replaced by Stuart Baird and credited as additional editor)
- Metalhead (2013)
- Lost River (2014) (co-edited with Nico Leunen)
- A Beautiful Now (2015) (co-edited with Adam H. Mack)
- Autumn Lights (2016)
- Kursk (2018)
- Flag Day (2021) (co-edited with Michelle Tesoro)

== Awards and nominations ==
| Year | Award | Category | Title | Result |
|---|---|---|---|---|
| 1998 | Danish Film Academy Awards | Best Editing | The Celebration | Won |
| 1999 | Danish Film Academy Awards | Best Editing | Mifune's Last Song | Won |
| 2002 | Edda Awards | Best Editing | The Sea | Won |
| 2004 | Antalya Golden Orange Film Festival | Best Film Editing | Toss-Up (Yazi tura) | Won |
| 2004 | American Cinema Editors | Best Edited Feature Film – Comedy or Musical | Eternal Sunshine of the Spotless Mind | Nominated |
| 2004 | BAFTA Awards | Best Editing | Eternal Sunshine of the Spotless Mind | Won |
| 2004 | Online Film Critics Society Awards | Best Editing | Eternal Sunshine of the Spotless Mind | Won |
| 2004 | San Diego Film Critics Society | Best Editing | Eternal Sunshine of the Spotless Mind | Won |
