= Thomas Vinterberg =

Danish film director

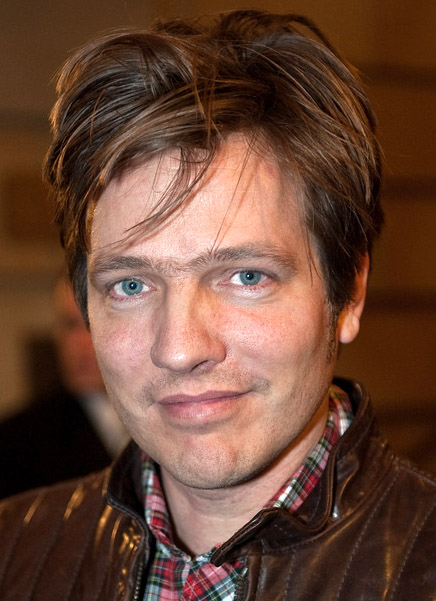
- Vinterberg in 2010
- Born: 19 May 1969 (age 57); Frederiksberg, Denmark
- Occupations: Film director; producer; screenwriter; actor
- Years active: 1990–present
- Spouses: Maria Walbom (m. 1990; div. 2007) Helene Reingaard Neumann (m. 2010)

Thomas Vinterberg (Danish: [ˈtsʰʌmæs ˈve̝nˀtɐˌpɛɐ̯ˀ]; born 19 May 1969) is a Danish film director who, along with Lars von Trier, co-founded the Dogme 95 movement in filmmaking, which established rules for simplifying movie production. He is best known for the films The Celebration (1998), Submarino (2010), The Hunt (2012), Far from the Madding Crowd (2015), and Another Round (2020). For Another Round he was nominated for the Academy Award for Best Director, the first Danish filmmaker nominated in the Best Director category.

== Early life and education ==
Vinterberg was born in Frederiksberg, Denmark. In 1993, he graduated from the National Film School of Denmark with Last Round (Sidste omgang), which won the jury and producers' awards at the Internationales Festival der Filmhochschulen München, and First Prize at Tel Aviv.

== Career ==
In 1993 Vinterberg made his first TV drama for DR TV and his short fiction film The Boy Who Walked Backwards, produced by Birgitte Hald at Nimbus Film. The film won awards at the 1994 Nordisk Panorama Film Festival, the International Short Film Festival in Clermont-Ferrand, and the Toronto International Film Festival. His first feature film was The Biggest Heroes (De Største Helte), a road movie that received acclaim in his native Denmark. In 1995, Vinterberg formed the Dogme 95 movement with Lars von Trier, Kristian Levring, and Søren Kragh-Jacobsen.

Following that dogma in 1998, he conceived, wrote and directed (and also had a small acting role in) the first of the Dogme movies, The Celebration (Festen). As per the rules of the Dogme manifesto, he did not take a directorial credit. However, he and the film won numerous nominations and awards, including the Jury Prize at the 1998 Cannes Film Festival. At the turn of the century, Vinterberg participated in the experimental broadcast D-dag, where he and three other filmmakers directed broadcasts on four different channels, with the viewer able to switch between them and create their own viewing experience. A final edit was released in 2001.

In 2003, he directed the apocalyptic science fiction romance-drama It's All About Love, a film he wrote, directed and produced himself over a period of five years. The film was entirely in English and featured, among others, Joaquin Phoenix, Claire Danes, and Sean Penn. The movie did not do well, as critics and audiences found it idiosyncratic and somewhat incomprehensible. His next film, the English-language Dear Wendy (2005), scripted by Lars von Trier, had poor ticket sales in his native Denmark where it sold only 14,521 tickets. However he won the Silver George for Best Director at the 27th Moscow International Film Festival. Vinterberg then tried to retrace his roots with a smaller Danish-language production, En mand kommer hjem (2007), which also had poor ticket sales in his native Denmark, selling only 31,232 tickets.

On 1 August 2008, he directed the music video for "The Day That Never Comes", the first single off Metallica's album Death Magnetic. His 2010 film Submarino was nominated for the Golden Bear at the 60th Berlin International Film Festival. In 2012, his film The Hunt competed for the Palme d'Or at the 2012 Cannes Film Festival and was nominated for Best Foreign Language Film at the 86th Academy Awards.

In 2015, he directed Far from the Madding Crowd, an adaptation of the acclaimed Thomas Hardy novel, starring Carey Mulligan, Matthias Schoenaerts, Michael Sheen and Tom Sturridge. Vinterberg reunited with Matthias Schoenaerts in Kursk, a film about the Kursk submarine disaster that happened in 2000.

In 2019, Vinterberg lost his daughter Ida in a car accident while she was traveling home from Belgium with her mother. As such, he dedicated Another Round (Druk) to her, while filming much of the film in her school with her classmates. Vinterberg was nominated for the Academy Award for Best Director for the film, which also won the BAFTA Award for Best Film Not in the English Language and the Academy Award for Best International Feature Film; he dedicated the latter award to Ida.

In 2024, Vinterberg's first foray into directing for TV was broadcast in Denmark. The seven-episode series called Families like Ours explores a near-future Denmark when the country is gradually evacuated due to rising sea levels.

== Filmography ==
=== Short film ===
| Year | Title | Director | Writer | Producer |
|---|---|---|---|---|
| 1990 | Sneblind | Yes | No | Executive |
| 1991 | Brudevalsen | Yes | Yes | No |
| 1993 | Sidste omgang | Yes | Yes | No |
| 1993 | Slaget på tasken | Yes | Yes | No |
| 1994 | Drengen der gik baglæns | Yes | Yes | Yes |

=== Feature film ===
| Year | Title | Director | Writer | Notes |
|---|---|---|---|---|
| 1996 | The Biggest Heroes | Yes | Yes | written with Bo Hr. Hansen |
| 1998 | The Celebration | Yes | Yes | uncredited as director, written with Mogens Rukov |
| 2003 | It's All About Love | Yes | Yes | written with Mogens Rukov |
| 2005 | Dear Wendy | Yes | No | |
| 2007 | A Man Comes Home | Yes | Yes | written with Mogens Rukov |
| 2010 | Submarino | Yes | Yes | written with Tobias Lindholm |
| 2012 | The Hunt | Yes | Yes | also producer, written with Tobias Lindholm |
| 2015 | Far from the Madding Crowd | Yes | No | based on the book of the same name |
| 2016 | The Commune | Yes | Yes | written with Tobias Lindholm |
| 2018 | Kursk | Yes | No | based on the book A Time to Die |
| 2020 | Another Round | Yes | Yes | written with Tobias Lindholm |

=== Television ===
| Year | Title | Director | Writer | Notes |
|---|---|---|---|---|
| 2001 | D-Day | Yes | No | Experimental film, in collaboration with Søren Kragh-Jacobsen, Kristian Levring, and Lars von Trier |
| 2024 | Families like Ours | Yes | Yes | Miniseries |

== Awards and honours ==
In April 2016, the French government appointed Vinterberg a Chevalier of the Ordre des Arts et des Lettres. For his film Another Round he was nominated for the Academy Award for Best Director and won the BAFTA Award for Best Film Not in the English Language.

| Award | Date of ceremony | Category | Nominated work | Result | Ref. |
|---|---|---|---|---|---|
| Academy Awards | March 2, 2014 | Best International Feature Film | The Hunt | Nominated | |
| Academy Awards | April 25, 2021 | Best International Feature Film | Another Round | Accepted | |
| Academy Awards | April 25, 2021 | Best Director | Another Round | Nominated | |
| BAFTA Awards | April 9, 2000 | Best Film Not in the English Language | The Celebration | Nominated | |
| BAFTA Awards | February 10, 2013 | Best Film Not in the English Language | The Hunt | Nominated | |
| BAFTA Awards | April 11, 2021 | Best Film Not in the English Language | Another Round | Won | |
| BAFTA Awards | April 11, 2021 | Best Direction | Another Round | Nominated | |
| BAFTA Awards | April 11, 2021 | Best Original Screenplay | Another Round | Nominated | |
| Cannes Film Festival | May 24, 1998 | Jury Prize | The Celebration | Won (Note: Tied with Class Trip by Claude Miller) | |
| Cannes Film Festival | May 24, 1998 | Palme d'Or | The Celebration | Nominated | |
| Cannes Film Festival | May 27, 2012 | Palme d'Or | The Hunt | Nominated | |
| Cannes Film Festival | May 27, 2012 | Prize of the Ecumenical Jury | The Hunt | Won | |
| César Awards | March 6, 1999 | Best Foreign Film | The Celebration | Nominated | |
| César Awards | March 12, 2021 | Best Foreign Film | Another Round | Won | |
| European Film Awards | December 4, 1998 | European Discovery of the Year | The Celebration | Won (Note: Tied with The Dream Life of Angels by Erick Zonca) | |
| European Film Awards | December 6, 2008 | Achievement in World Cinema | —N/a | Honored (Note: Shared with Søren Kragh-Jacobsen, Kristian Levring, and Lars von Trier) | |
| European Film Awards | December 1, 2012 | Best Film | The Hunt | Nominated | |
| European Film Awards | December 1, 2012 | Best Director | The Hunt | Nominated | |
| European Film Awards | December 1, 2012 | Best Screenwriter | The Hunt | Won | |
| European Film Awards | December 9, 2017 | People's Choice Award | The Commune | Nominated | |
| European Film Awards | December 12, 2020 | Best Film | Another Round | Won | |
| European Film Awards | December 12, 2020 | Best Director | Another Round | Won | |
| European Film Awards | December 12, 2020 | Best Screenwriter | Another Round | Won | |
| European Film Awards | December 12, 2020 | University Film Award | Another Round | Nominated | |
| Film Independent Spirit Awards | March 20, 1999 | Best International Film | The Celebration | Won | |
| Film Independent Spirit Awards | March 1, 2014 | Best International Film | The Hunt | Nominated | |
| Goya Awards | February 9, 2014 | Best European Film | The Hunt | Nominated | |
| Ordre des Arts et des Lettres | April 27, 2016 | Chevalier | —N/a | Honored | |
| Robert Awards | 1994 | Best Documentary Short | Drengen der gik baglæns | Won | |
| Robert Awards | 1999 | Best Danish Film | The Celebration | Won | |
| Robert Awards | 1999 | Best Screenplay | The Celebration | Won | |
| Robert Awards | February 6, 2011 | Best Danish Film | Submarino | Nominated | |
| Robert Awards | February 6, 2011 | Best Director | Submarino | Nominated | |
| Robert Awards | February 6, 2011 | Best Screenplay | Submarino | Nominated | |
| Robert Awards | February 26, 2014 | Best Danish Film | The Hunt | Won | |
| Robert Awards | February 26, 2014 | Best Director | The Hunt | Won | |
| Robert Awards | February 26, 2014 | Best Screenplay | The Hunt | Won | |
| Robert Awards | February 26, 2014 | Audience Award | The Hunt | Won | |
| Robert Awards | 2017 | Best Danish Film | The Commune | Nominated | |
| Robert Awards | 2017 | Best Director | The Commune | Nominated | |
| Robert Awards | 2017 | Best Adapted Screenplay | The Commune | Won | |
| Robert Awards | February 6, 2021 | Best Danish Film | Another Round | Won | |
| Robert Awards | February 6, 2021 | Best Director | Another Round | Won | |
| Robert Awards | February 6, 2021 | Best Original Screenplay | Another Round | Won | |
| Robert Awards | February 1, 2025 | Best Danish Television Series | Families like Ours | Nominated | |
| Satellite Awards | January 17, 1999 | Best Foreign Language Film | The Celebration | Nominated | |
