= The Celebration =

1998 Danish black comedy-drama film

Festen
- Danish theatrical release poster
- Directed by: Thomas Vinterberg (uncredited, per the rules of Dogme 95)
- Written by: Thomas Vinterberg; Mogens Rukov
- Produced by: Birgitte Hald
- Starring: Ulrich Thomsen; Henning Moritzen; Thomas Bo Larsen; Paprika Steen; Birthe Neumann; Trine Dyrholm
- Cinematography: Anthony Dod Mantle
- Edited by: Valdís Óskarsdóttir
- Music by: Lars Bo Jensen
- Production company: Nimbus Film
- Distributed by: Scanbox Danmark
- Release dates: 17 May 1998 (Cannes); 19 June 1998 (Denmark)
- Running time: 105 minutes
- Country: Denmark
- Languages: Danish; English
- Budget: US$1.3 million

The Celebration (Danish: Festen) is a 1998 Danish black comedy-drama film directed by Thomas Vinterberg and produced by Nimbus Film. It tells the story of a family gathering to celebrate their patriarch's 60th birthday, during which a family secret is revealed.

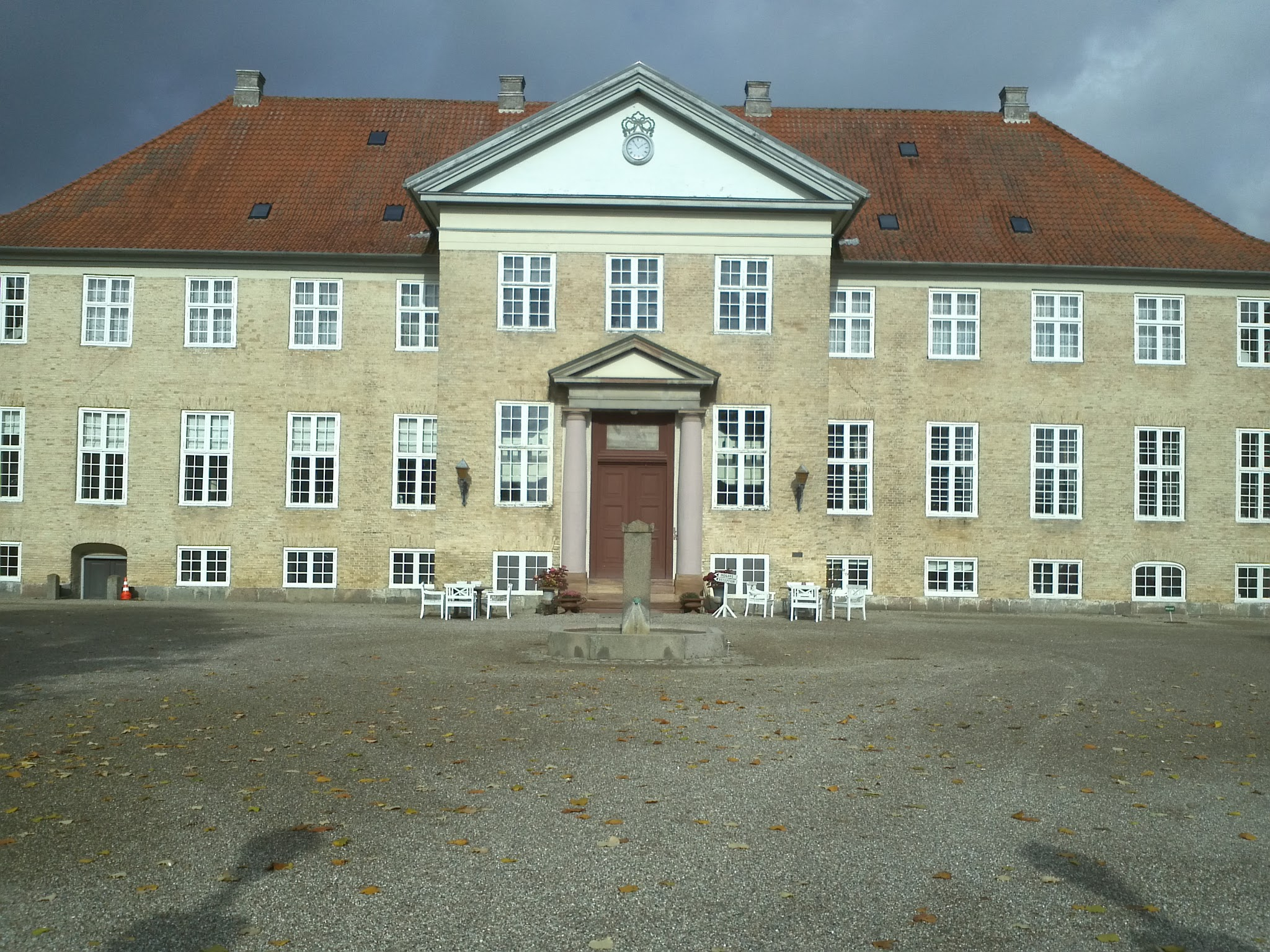
Skjoldenæsholm Castle was the filming location of Festen.

Festen was the first film of the Dogme 95 movement, which was created by Vinterberg and his fellow Danish director Lars von Trier. The movement preferred simple and analog production values to allow for the highlighting of plot and performance. The film won the Jury Prize at the 1998 Cannes Film Festival and was selected as the Danish entry for Best Foreign Language Film at the 71st Academy Awards, but it was not chosen as one of the final five nominees for the award.

== Plot ==
Helge, a respected businessman and family patriarch, is celebrating his 60th birthday at the family-run hotel. Gathered together amongst a large party of family and friends are his wife Else, his sullen eldest son Christian, his rude and arrogant younger son Michael, and his well-traveled daughter Helene. Another sibling, Linda, has recently taken her life at the hotel. Helene finds Linda's suicide note, but hides it in a medicine bottle after becoming upset by the undisclosed contents. Michael fights with his wife, whom he had earlier abandoned on the roadside with their three children, and then has sex with her. He later beats Michelle, a waitress at the hotel, after she pulls him aside to tell him that she is pregnant as a result of their affair and insults his family.

At Helge's birthday dinner, Christian stands to toast his father, and asks that Helge choose between two speeches that Christian has prepared. Helge chooses one, and Christian declares it is the 'truth' speech (The contents of the other speech are never disclosed). During the speech, he publicly accuses Helge of sexually abusing both him and his twin sister Linda as children. After an initial shocked silence, the party goes on as usual, with guests attempting to ignore what has happened. Helge pulls Christian aside to question him about his accusations. He questions his motives for slandering his father, and Christian appears to withdraw his accusation. However, Christian is spurred to further action by hotel chef Kim, a childhood friend who knows about the abuse. Kim orders Pia and Michelle, two other staff members, to hide the guests' car keys. Christian then continues his toast by accusing Helge of causing Linda's death through the trauma of the abuse. Helge speaks to Christian alone and threatens to bring up his troubled personal history, including his impotence with women and Christian's possibly incestuous relationship with Linda, mocking him that Linda did not say goodbye to him before committing suicide.

Further exacerbating the tensions of the day, Helene's black boyfriend Gbatokai shows up, inciting conflict between him and Michael. Else later makes a toast where she makes insulting comments about her children, and accuses Christian of having an overactive imagination. She asks him to apologize for his earlier statements and accusations. Christian accuses Else of knowing about the abuse yet not intervening. Michael and two other guests eject Christian from the hotel. When Christian walks back in, they beat him and tie him to a tree in the woods outside the hotel. Gbatokai taunts Michael about Christian, causing the racist Michael to lead most of the partygoers in singing the racist Danish song "Jeg har set en rigtig negermand" ("I Have Seen a Real Negro Man"), in order to offend him. Christian unties himself and returns. Pia finds Linda's suicide note and gives it to Christian.

Christian gives the note to Helene, and she reads it aloud in front of the party guests. In the note, Linda states that she is overwhelmed by trauma from Helge's abuse, explaining her suicide, and that she always loved Christian. Helge admits to his misdeeds, claiming it was all his children were good for, and leaves the dining room. Christian has a hallucination of Linda, causing him to faint. As he awakes, he learns from Helene that Michael is missing. Michael, also drunk, calls Helge outside and beats him severely. The following morning, while the family and guests eat breakfast, Helge comes in and speaks to the group. He admits to his wrongdoing and declares his love for his children. Michael tells his father to leave the table. Christian asks Pia to move to Paris with him, to which she accepts.

== Cast ==
- Ulrich Thomsen as Christian Klingenfeldt-Hansen
- Henning Moritzen as Helge, Christian's father
- Thomas Bo Larsen as Michael, Christian's brother
- Paprika Steen as Helene, Christian's sister
- Birthe Neumann as Else, Christian's mother
- Trine Dyrholm as Pia, the waiter who is close to Christian
- Helle Dolleris as Mette, Michael's wife
- Therese Glahn as Michelle, the waiter who Michael slept with a year ago
- Klaus Bondam as Helmut von Sachs, the toastmaster
- Bjarne Henriksen as Kim, the head chef and Christian's old friend
- Gbatokai Dakinah as Gbatokai, Helene's American boyfriend
- Lasse Lunderskov as Christian's uncle
- Lars Brygmann as Lars, the receptionist
- Lene Laub Oksen as Linda, Christian's dead twin sister
- Linda Laursen as Birthe, the woman who hits on Pia
- John Boas as Christian's grandfather
- Erna Boas as Christian's grandmother
- Thomas Vinterberg as taxi driver

== Production ==
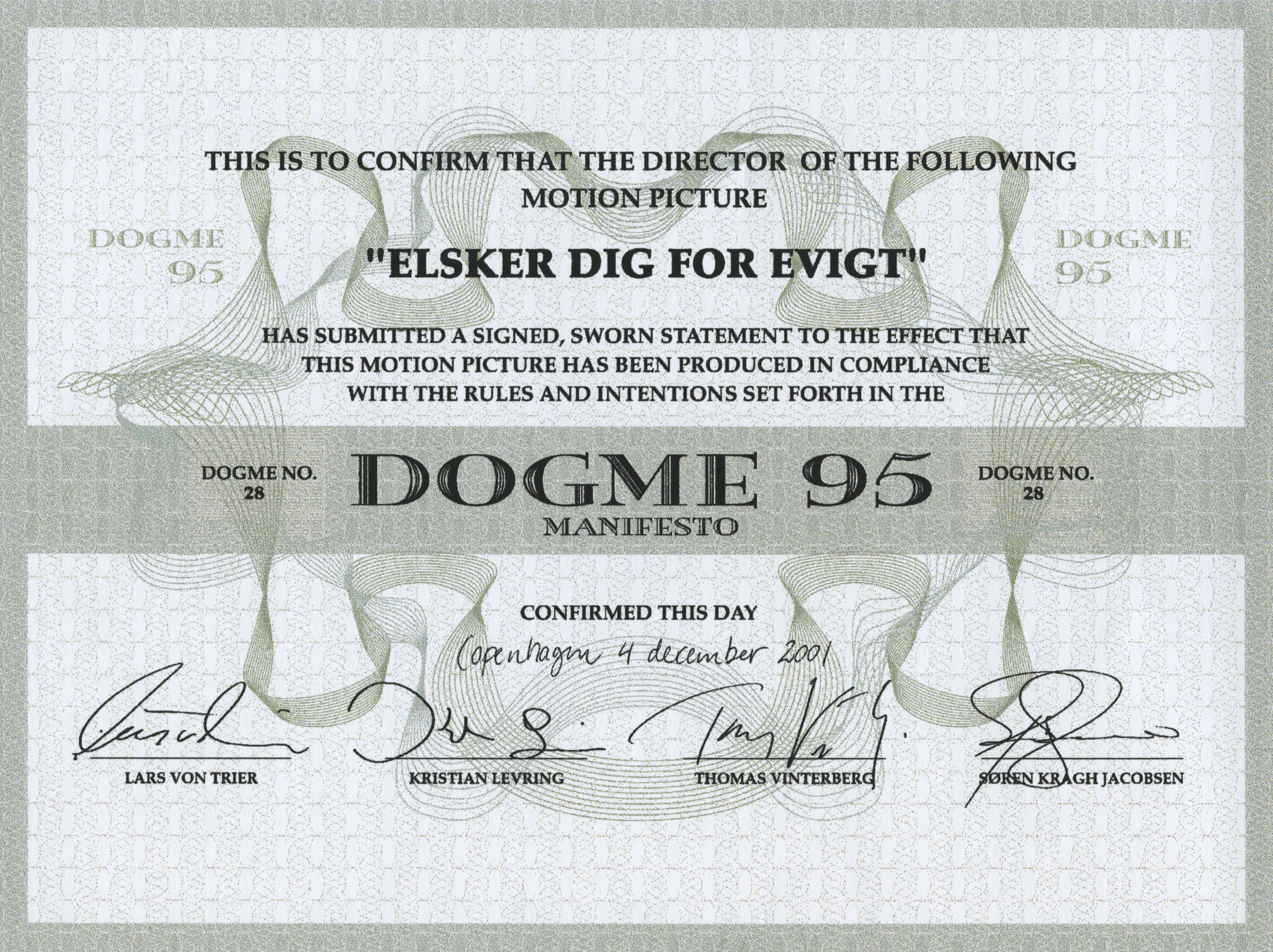
The Dogme 95 certificate of authenticity for Susanne Bier's Open Hearts (2002).

Some years after making the film, Vinterberg talked about its inspiration: a story told by a young man on a radio show hosted by Kjeld Koplev. Vinterberg was told about the interview by the friend of a psychiatric nurse, who claimed to have treated the young man. He listened to the radio programme and asked the scriptwriter Mogens Rukov to write a screenplay on the events, as if it were the young man's own story. It was later revealed that the story was completely made up by the patient receiving mental care, though this seems highly unlikely in light of the film's deep and nuanced understanding of familial dynamics in the families of abused children.

The film is best known for being the first Dogme 95 film (its full title in Denmark is Dogme 1 – Festen). Dogme films are governed by a manifesto that insists on specific production and narrative limitations (such as banning any post-production sound editing), in part as a protest against expensive Hollywood-style film-making. The movie is a low budget film and was shot on a Sony DCR-PC7 Handycam on standard Mini-DV cassettes.

== Reception ==
=== Critical response ===
Festen received positive reviews from critics. On the film review aggregator website Rotten Tomatoes, 91% of 47 critics' reviews of the film are positive, with an average rating of 8.1/10; the site's "critics consensus" reads: "As sharp and ruthless as the family dynamic that powers its plot, The Celebration blends tragedy and comedy to brilliant effect." On Metacritic, the film has a weighted average score of 82 out of 100 based on reviews from 7 critics, indicating "universal acclaim".

Roger Ebert gave the film three out of four stars, writing that it "mixes farce and tragedy so completely that it challenges us to respond at all. ... Vinterberg handles his material so cannily that we must always look for clues to the intended tone."

Psychologist Richard Gartner, who specializes in counseling men who were sexually abused as children, called Festen a praiseworthy film that accurately depicts the consequences of sexual abuse, writing:

The extent of the father's transgressions is revealed bit by bit in successive revelations. We see that the son has been severely damaged by his boyhood abuse, and has been incapable of intimate relatedness throughout his life. His sister, who has committed suicide, was also deeply damaged. The father denies the incest through most of the movie, and this denial is conveyed and reinforced in the reactions of those who hear the accusations. The partygoers are momentarily shocked by each disclosure, but then continue to celebrate the birthday in a nearly surrealistic manner that serves as a dramatic enactment of the chronic denial often seen in incestuous families.

=== Accolades ===
Festen won the following awards:

- Amanda Awards, Norway (1998): Best Nordic Feature Film – Thomas Vinterberg
- Belgian Syndicate of Cinema Critics (2000): Grand Prix
- Bodil Awards (1999):
  - Best Actor – Ulrich Thomsen
  - Best Film – Thomas Vinterberg
- Canberra International Film Festival (1999): Audience Award – Thomas Vinterberg
- Cannes Film Festival (1998): Jury Prize – Thomas Vinterberg (tied with Class Trip)
- European Film Awards (1998): European Discovery of the Year – Thomas Vinterberg (tied with The Dreamlife of Angels)
- Gijón International Film Festival (1998): Best Director – Thomas Vinterberg
- Guldbagge Awards (1999): Best Foreign Film – Thomas Vinterberg
- Independent Spirit Awards (1999): Best Foreign Film – Thomas Vinterberg
- Los Angeles Film Critics Association Awards (1998): Best Foreign Film – Thomas Vinterberg
- Lübeck Nordic Film Days (1998):
  - Audience Prize of the "Lübecker Nachrichten" – Thomas Vinterberg
  - Baltic Film Prize for a Nordic Feature Film – Thomas Vinterberg
  - Prize of the Ecumenical Jury – Thomas Vinterberg
- New York Film Critics Circle Awards (1998): Best Foreign Language Film – Thomas Vinterberg
- Norwegian International Film Festival (1999): Best Foreign Film of the Year – Thomas Vinterberg
- Robert Awards (1999):
  - Best Actor – Ulrich Thomsen
  - Best Cinematography – Anthony Dod Mantle
  - Best Editing – Valdís Óskarsdóttir
  - Best Film – Thomas Vinterberg
  - Best Screenplay – Thomas Vinterberg, Mogens Rukov
  - Best Supporting Actor – Thomas Bo Larsen
  - Best Supporting Actress – Birthe Neumann
- Rotterdam International Film Festival (1999): Audience Award – Thomas Vinterberg
- São Paulo International Film Festival (1998): Honorable Mention – Thomas Vinterberg

== Stage adaptations ==
The film has frequently been adapted for the stage.

An English-language stage adaptation of Festen written by David Eldridge premiered at the Almeida Theatre in 2004 in a production directed by Rufus Norris, before transferring to a successful West End run at the Lyric Theatre, London until April 2005. It commenced a UK tour in February 2006, before transferring to Broadway. Despite its great success in London, the play closed after only 49 performances on Broadway, ending its run on 20 May 2006. An Australian production starring Jason Donovan opened in Melbourne in July 2006, and an Irish production ran in the Gate Theatre, Dublin, from September to November 2006.

In 2006, a Mexican adaptation opened starring Mexican actor Diego Luna. In September 2007, a Peruvian production opened starring Paul Vega and Hernán Romero under the direction of Chela de Ferrari.

The Company Theatre mounted the Canadian premiere of Festen in November 2008 at the Berkeley Street Theatre in Toronto. This production was directed by Jason Byrne and starred Eric Peterson, Rosemary Dunsmore, Nicholas Campbell, Philip Riccio, Allan Hawco, Tara Rosling, Caroline Cave, Richard Clarkin, Earl Pastko, Milton Barnes, Gray Powell, and Alex Paxton-Beesley.

The Shadwell Dramatic Society's production of Festen opened at the ADC Theatre, Cambridge on 6 March 2012.

In July 2018, Play Dead Theatre's production of Festen opened at the Rippon Lea Estate in Melbourne. It was directed by Jennifer Sarah Dean and starred Adrian Mulvany.

Mark-Anthony Turnage composed an opera, Festen, based on the film, with libretto by Lee Hall, with first performances from 11 to 27 February 2025 at the Royal Opera House, London.

== See also ==
- List of submissions to the 71st Academy Awards for Best Foreign Language Film
- List of Danish submissions for the Academy Award for Best Foreign Language Film
