= Ole Christian Madsen =

Danish film director and script writer

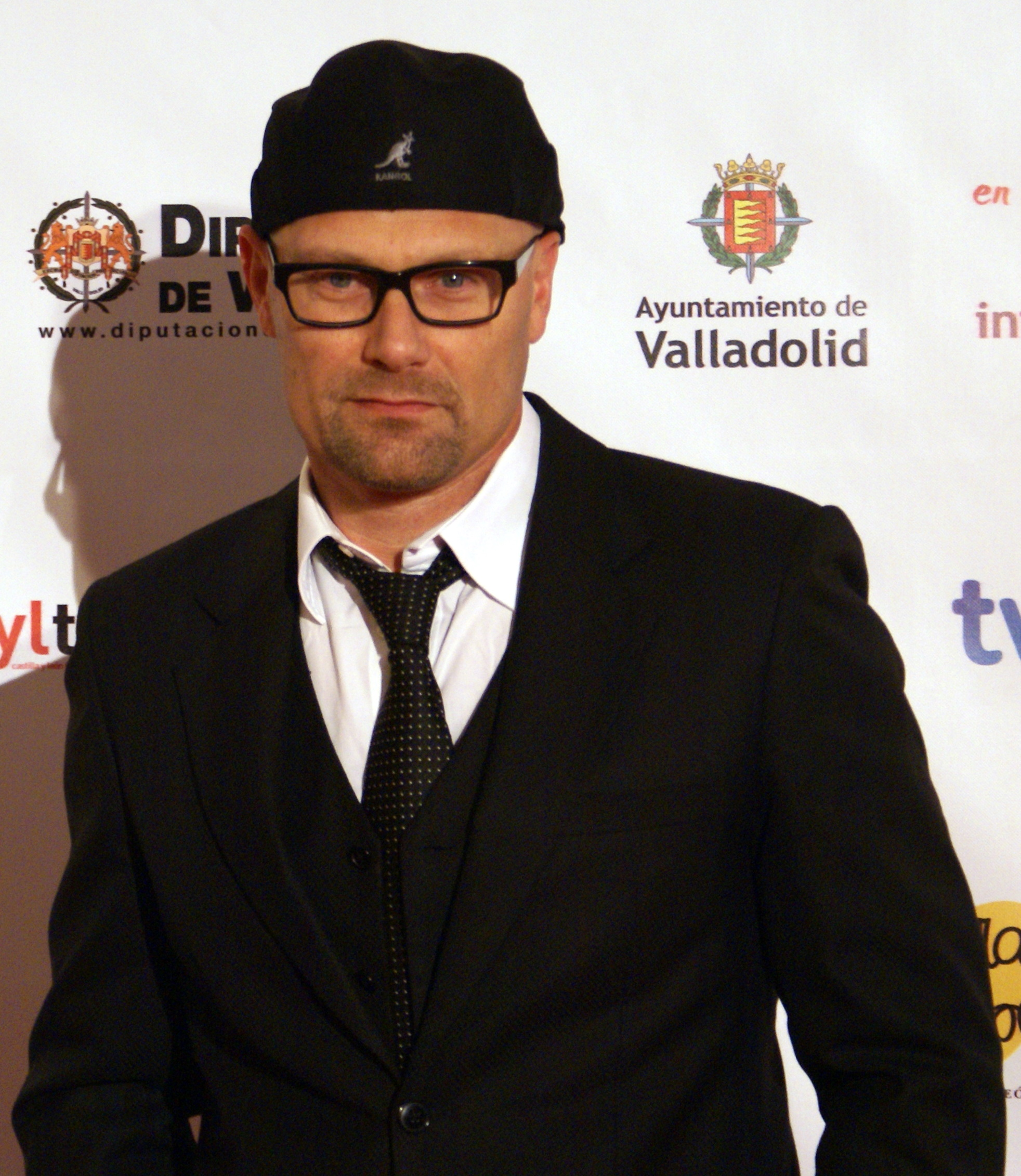
Ole Christian Madsen.

Ole Christian Madsen (born 18 June 1966) is a Danish film director and script writer. Among his most successful projects are the movies Flame & Citron, Prag, Angels in Fast Motion (da. Nordkraft) and the TV series Rejseholdet and Edderkoppen (The Spider).

Madsen was a part of the "Golden Year" graduating from the Danish Film school as he graduated alongside Thomas Vinterberg and Per Fly. Madsen started his film career by directing film mini series and shorts but in 1997 directed his first movie Sinan's Wedding. Shortly after, in 1999, his second film Pizza King was released. Both of his first two films deal with immigration in Denmark and were the first films to address the current debate Denmark faces with a new wave of immigration.

Madsen began to gain more popularity and recognition in Denmark when he released the 2000 film noir miniseries Edderkoppen, which is about a reporter in post World War 2 Copenhagen. In 2001 Madsen received a dozen international awards, including the National Bodil award and the Roberts award for his film Kira's Reason.

His 2011 film SuperClásico was shortlisted as the Danish entry for the Best Foreign Language Film at the 84th Academy Awards. Starting in 2013, Madsen served as a regular director on the American action series Banshee for Cinemax, directing a total of 10 episodes over 4 seasons, including the series finale in 2016.

== Filmography ==
- Sinan's Wedding (1997)
- Pizza King (1999)
- The Spider (series) (2000)
- Kira's Reason: A Love Story (2001)
- Angels in Fast Motion aka Nordkraft (2005)
- Prag aka Prague (2006)
- Flame & Citron (2008)
- SuperClásico (2011)
- Itsi Bitsi (2014)
- Banshee (2013–2016) 10 episodes (credited as O.C. Madsen)
