= Christian Geo Heltboe =

Danish comedian (born 1975)

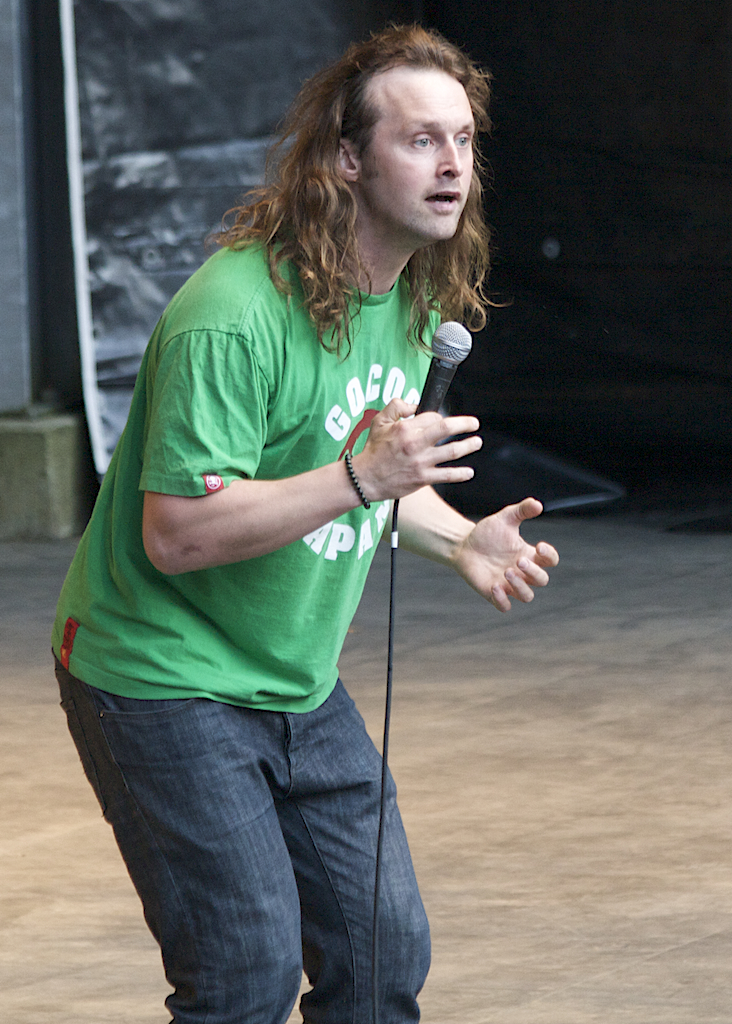
- Born: 12 August 1975 (age 50); Aalborg, Denmark

Christian Geo Heltboe (born 12 August 1975 in Aalborg) is a Danish comedian. He is best known under his middle name Geo.

== Biography ==
Geo debuted in 1996 as a comedian at Café Abbey Square home town of Aalborg. Geo has studied English at the Aalborg University. In 1999, Geo moved to Copenhagen and captured the capital's scenes with stand-up in the classical style.

Geo's stand-up career took However, in earnest, when he reinvented himself in his own unique and very natural style, where improvisation and interaction with the audience plays a supporting role. Geo won hence Denmark Cup Stand-up in 2000.

Over a period of a few months in the same year, reported Geo together with Anders Matthesen in radio program Oraklet on his various expeditions into the world, and he took the role Aikiko that removes Abel W. Dipp's (played by Frank Hvam) constipation in the Danish cult television series Kissmeyer Basic by Mikael Wulff and Christopher Boe.

Geo's big break came with a stand-up show Den ægte vare in 2002 when he joined with Rune Klan, Jacob Tingleff, Mick Øgendahl, Anders Matthesen and Carsten Eskelund. Comedy remarks appeared in a total of 24 times with great success and sold-out shows, and Geo had established itself as one of Denmark's most popular comedians.

During the show Talegaver til børn in 2003 toppled Geo Tivoli's concert hall with a breathless monologue about a relationship decay and bourgeois to follow. Geo participated in 2004 in a section of the Danish version of the semi alternative BBC quiz Shooting Stars hosted by Casper Christensen and Frank Hvam. Later came up with Geo permanent feature in the shows Rundfunk and Katapult. In 2004 he took over the job on the show "Zulu Bingo" after comedian Jan Elhøj. Where he host in one season.

In 2006 Geo part of the panel Sara Bro's love program Hjerteflimmer, and he debuted the same year as a stage actor at the Bellevue Teatret together with Jacob Tingleff, Omar Marzouk, Michael Schøtt and Tobias Dybvad in the comedy show Ordet Er Mit. 2006 was also the year when Geo started as a columnist and supplier of hidden camera video clips to Ekstra Bladet. Additional he stood behind the 2007 Web TV Christmas calendar in 24 sections "Ekstra Bladet Christmas" and in the summer of 2008 behind "July calendar" in 12 sections. In early 2006 came his first one-man show Geo's Garage on DVD. In late 2006 Geo took its stand-up scenes with his second one-man show "Ego Geo '. This show was released on DVD summer 2008. As additional material contained "Ego Geo 'selected clips from Geo's role as consumer extended arm, columnist and hidden camera agent provocateur for Ekstra Bladet.

In early 2009 Geo starred in an episode of Frank Hvam and Casper Christensen's sitcom Klovn. Further contributing to Geo children's book "Stå Op Historier" with a side acclaimed short story "Fiona Klarsyn". The novel which is written for children is also a political commentary on xenophobia especially represented by Danish politician Pia Kjærsgaard. Geo went in autumn 2009 on tour with one man show "Mit Indre dyr" and has premiered on the serie "Hvor fanden er Herning" with comedian colleagues Mick Øgendahl and Linda P.
