= Annual Regatta at Aarhus University =

Boat race

Regatta at AU
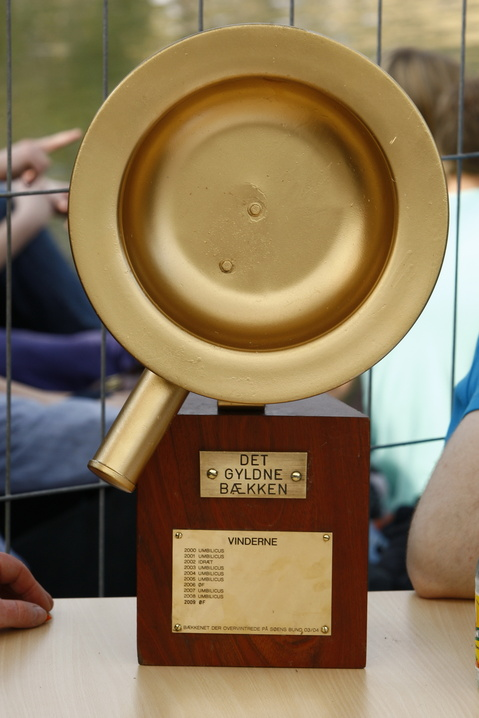
- "Det gyldne bækken", 2010

Event information
- Type: sailing
- Race area: University Park
- Dates: April and May
- First race: 1991

The Regatta at Aarhus University (also known as "the spring regatta" or "the boat race". In Danish "Kapsejlads") is an annual relay race held by members of Aarhus University on one of the lakes at the university park in Aarhus. The first regatta was held in 1991 and has been held annually since. The race is usually held the first Friday in May.

Every year, 12 teams participate, each team representing a department of the university, and each team consisting of five members (of which both genders must be represented). The goal of the race is to cross the lake in an inflatable item which the team brings themselves. Upon crossing, each participant must drink one beer, spin around the bottle ten times, and then cross back over the lake. Each of the team's five participants repeat this. The team spending least amount of time wins.

The winning team is rewarded the trophy "Det gyldne bækken" (lit. "the golden bedpan").

In recent years, the event has attracted approximately 30.000 spectators.

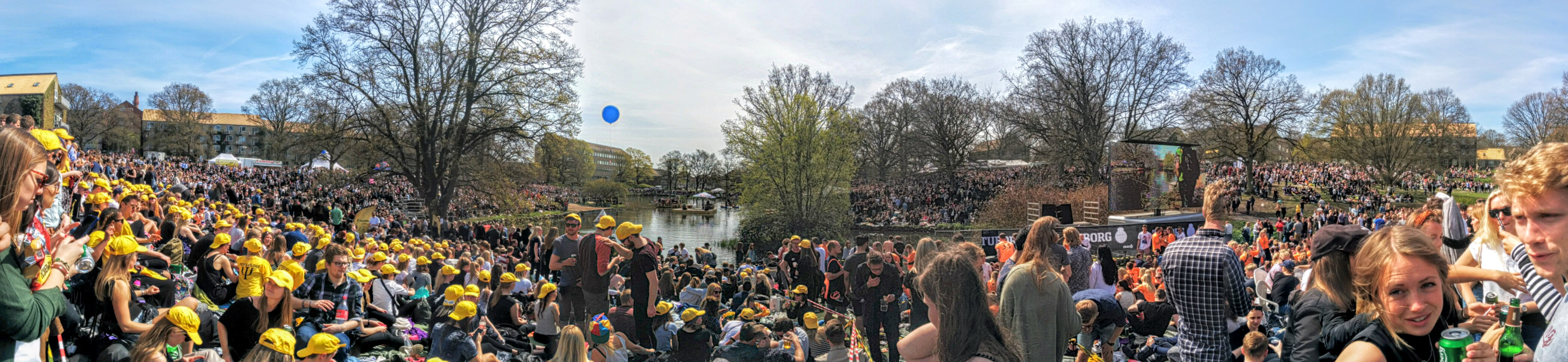
Kapsejlads 2016.

== The Champions ==
Year	Date	Presenters	Winner	No. of spectators (estimated)	Sources
2000	5 May	Niels Franzen and Thomas Dissing	Medicine	–	
2001	4 May	Niels Franzen and Thomas Dissing	Medicine	–	
2002	3 May	Casper Christensen	Sport Science	–	
2003	2 May	Anders Lund Madsen	Medicine	10.000	
2004	7 May	–	Medicine	–	
2005	6 May	Dolph and Michael Wulff	Medicine	–	
2006	5 May	Niels-Peter Henriksen and Anders Bonde	Economics	–	
2007	4 May	Monrad & Rislund	Medicine	–	
2008	2 May	Anders Lund Madsen and Anders Breinholt	Medicine	15.000	
2009	7 May	Mads Brügger and Mikael Bertelsen	Economics	15.000	
2010	29 April	Simon Jul and Rasmus Bjerg	Medicine	–	
2011	29 April	Huxi Bach and Karen Thisted	Economics	20.000	
2012	3 May	Dennis Ritter and Jørgen Leth	Economics	24.000	
2013	25 April	Esben Bjerre and Peter Falktoft	Medicine	25.000	
2014	9 May	Esben Bjerre and Peter Falktoft	Political Science	25.000–30.000	
2015	24 April	Simon Jul and Rasmus Bjerg	Medicine	25.000–30.000	
2016	6 May	Pelle Peter Jensen and Nicholas Kawamura	Psychology	25.000–30.000	
2017	28 April	David Mandel and Christian Fuhlendorff	Psychology	25.000–30.000	
2018	4 May	Anders Lund Madsen and Anders Breinholt	Medicine	30.000	
2019	3 May	Rolf Sørensen and Dennis Ritter	Medicine	30.000	
2020	Cancelled	–	–	–	
2021	25 June	Simon Jul and Peter Falktoft	Psychology	–	
2022	29 April	Melvin Kakooza and Martin Johannes Larsen	Engineering	30.000	
2023	28 April	Melvin Kakooza and Martin Johannes Larsen	Medicine	30.000	
2024	3 May	Esben Bjerre and Peter Falktoft	Medicine	30.000	
2025	25 April	Mark Le Fevre and Thomas Warberg	Dentistry	30.000	
