= Klown Forever =

- Directed by: Mikkel Nørgaard
- Written by: Casper Christensen; Frank Hvam
- Produced by: Jesper Zartov
- Starring: Frank Hvam; Casper Christensen; Adam Levine; Isla Fisher
- Cinematography: Jacob Banke Olesen
- Edited by: Morten Egholm; Frederik Strunk
- Music by: Nicklas Schmidt
- Distributed by: Nordisk Film
- Release date: 24 September 2015
- Running time: 90 minutes
- Country: Denmark
- Language: Danish
- Budget: 27.1 mio. DKK

Klown Forever (Danish: Klovn Forever) is a Danish comedy from 2015 and the successor to the cinema success Klovn - The Movie (2010). It is directed by Mikkel Nørgaard, while Casper Christensen and Frank Hvam scripted. The cast includes Casper Christensen, Frank Hvam, Mia Lyhne, Iben Hjejle, Nikolaj Coster-Waldau, Isla Fisher, and Adam Levine.

== Synopsis ==
== Frank and Casper’s friendship faces a breaking point when Casper unexpectedly announces his plans to move to Los Angeles. Devastated by the news, Frank impulsively decides to follow him and settles into Casper’s luxurious mansion.

In an effort to celebrate his new life in Los Angeles, Casper throws an extravagant party themed around his Danish roots, cleverly naming it “The Great Dane.” The event draws an eclectic crowd, but tensions rise when Frank inadvertently offends Casper’s housekeeper, who is a member of a First Nations community. What begins as a glamorous evening quickly spirals into chaos, tarnishing the festivities.

Amid the fallout, Frank crosses an unthinkable line by having an affair with Casper’s daughter, further jeopardizing their already strained relationship.

== Cast ==
- Casper Christensen as Casper
- Frank Hvam as Frank
- Mia Lyhne as Mia
- Iben Hjejle as Iben
- Lars Hjortshøj as Lars
- Nikolaj Coster-Waldau as himself
- Isla Fisher as herself
- Adam Levine as himself
