= Journey to Saturn =

- Theatrical release poster
- Directed by: Thorbjørn Christoffersen; Craig Frank
- Written by: Claus Deleuran (comic); Nikolaj Arcel (screenplay); Rasmus Heisterberg (screenplay)
- Produced by: Trine Heidegaard
- Starring: Casper Christensen; Frank Hvam; Ali Kazim; Simon Jul Jørgensen; Iben Hjejle; Lars Hjortshøj
- Edited by: Mikkel E.G. Nielsen; Per Risager; Martin Wichmann
- Music by: Henrik Lindstrand
- Production companies: A. Film A/S; TV2 Denmark
- Distributed by: Nordisk Film
- Release date: 26 September 2008
- Running time: 90 minutes
- Country: Denmark
- Language: Danish

Journey to Saturn (Danish: Rejsen til Saturn) is a 2008 Danish adult computer-animated science fiction comedy film, directed by Thorbjørn Christoffersen and Craig Frank. It was produced by A. Film A/S and loosely based on Claus Deleuran's comic from 1977 of the same name. The film revolves around a group of Danish astronauts who journey to Saturn on a quest for natural resources.

The film also depicts and mocks several Danish stereotypes and characters, like the royal family, the (at the time) Danish prime minister Anders Fogh Rasmussen, Extreme right-wing politician Mogens Glistrup, Danish therapist Carl Mar Møller, Muslim immigrants, American yeehaw's, Jesus, and Danish lack of style and presentability in general.

== Plot ==
A corporate-backed rocket takes off from Denmark to explore and conquer Saturn for natural resources. The crew consists of wannabe astronaut Per Jensen, military instructor and hardliner Sgt. Arne Skrydsbøl, supply officer Fisse-Ole (Pussy-Ole), tour chef and caterer Jamil Ahmadinejad volunteering because he failed his nationality test (and gets another chance), and two pilots.

Upon arrival, the crew makes contact with aliens but it becomes apparent that the chief of the Danish corporation wishes to conspire with the aliens to sell off all the water on Earth (except Greenland). The mission was meant to fail, and the astronauts were never meant to return home. The aliens clear out the Earth spaceship and head to Earth on the way looking into some of the loot from Earth - including a video film they believe to be instructions on friendly Earth greetings, but being in fact a German pornographic movie involving large sausages.

The astronauts are left for dead in space, but fall through a black hole and land in Heaven where they get some support. Leaving Heaven guided by the Holy Spirit in the form of a dove, they refuel and make it back to the Moon where they encounter some US astronauts in their secret lunar missile base (including a redneck campervan, shotguns and barbecue). The team then use a US space-based surveillance system to find the centre of the water theft conspiracy back on Earth. The crew return to Earth and rescue a hostage scientist (Per Jensen's girlfriend) at the installation after an gunfight with. They defeat an alien monster with a keg of beer in a manner similar to that in Jaws and escape the installation just in time as it is destroyed by a nuclear bomb, sent from the Moon.

== Voice cast ==
- Casper Christensen as Per Jensen
- Frank Hvam as Sergeant Arne Skrydsbøl
- Ali Kazim as Jamil Ahmadinejad
- Simon Jul Jørgensen as Pussy-Ole
- Iben Hjejle as Susanne Mortensen: Chief technical flight director
- Lars Hjortshøj as Ib
- Bjarke Søballe Andersen as Crowd
- Kresten Vestbjerg Andersen as Drunk
- Peter Belli as Alien Dictator
- Rasmus Bjerg as Agent 2
- Klaus Bondam as Kurt Maj: A businessman
- Thorbjørn Christoffersen as General
- Tine Clasen as Crowd
- Claus Darholt as Assistant
- Tobias Dybvad as the Prime Minister
- Craig Frank as Afro-American Astronaut
- Morten Pilegaard Jespersen as Crowd
- Roberto Johansson as Jørgen from Hundige Shortwave Radio Club
- Karsten Kiilerich as German Peasant
- Henrik Koefoed as Doctor & Alien Researcher
- Flemming Krøll as Prince Henrik
- Tilde Landgreen as Small girl
- Jørgen Lerdam as Liberal Journalist
- Anders Lund Madsen as Reserve Jesus
- Justin Murphy as Redneck Astronaut
- Kjeld Nørgaard as Skt. Peter
- Esben Pretzmann as Alien Soldier
- Lasse Rimmer as TV Reporter / Gert
- Ask Rostrup as Intercom voice
- Sidsel Rostrup as Angel
- Puk Scharbau as German peasant girl
- Jonas Schmidt as Agent 1
- Regitze Stampe as Crowd
- Martin Wichmann as Tax cheater
