= Claire Ross-Brown =

English actress

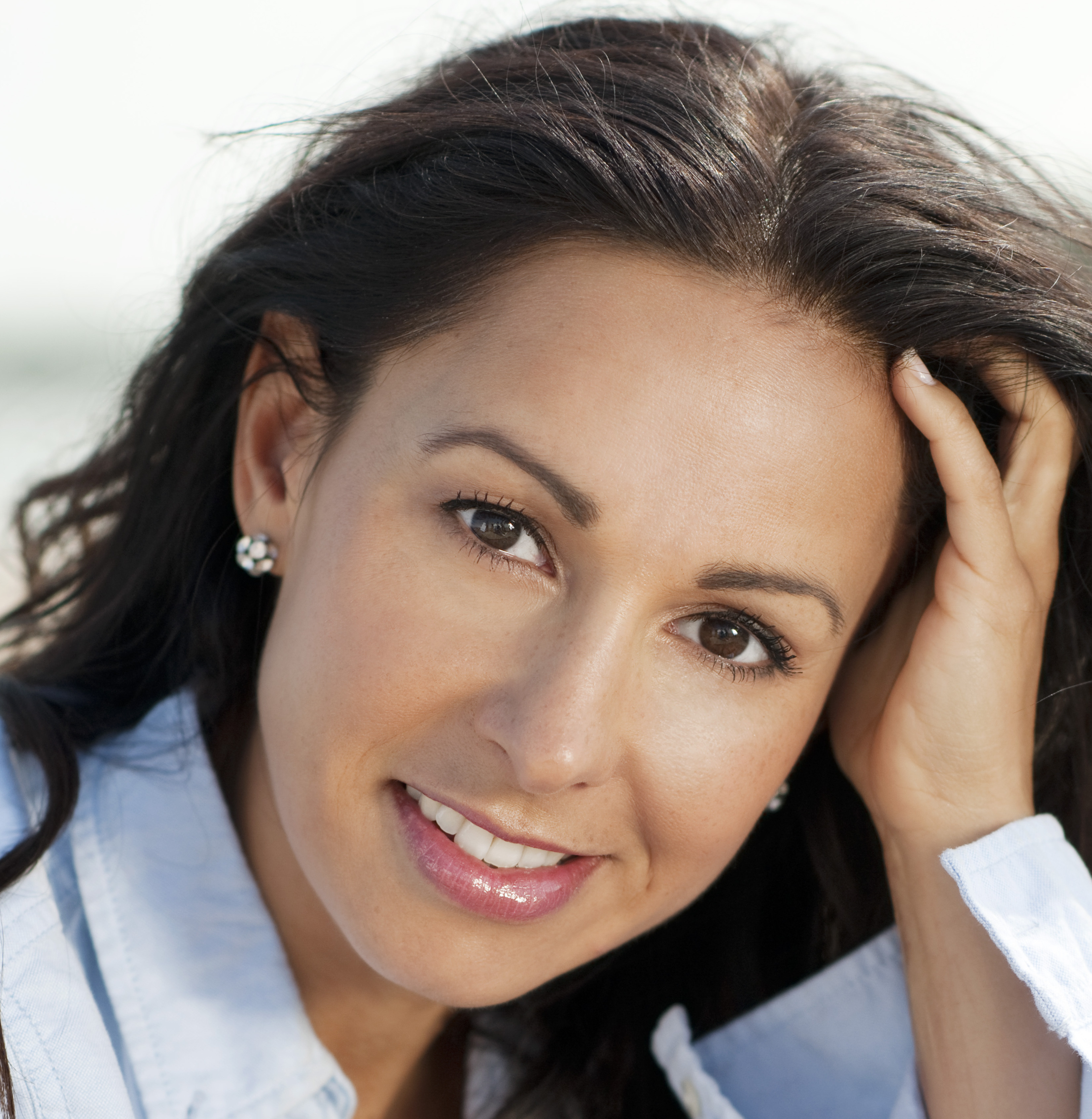
- Claire Ross-Brown
- Born: Claire Ross-Brown; 11 November 1972 (age 53); Chelsea, London, England, United Kingdom

Claire Ross-Brown (born 11 November 1972) is an English actress. Claire was born in Chelsea, London. Her father is English and her mother, although English, is of Italian and Malaysian ancestry. Claire studied at the Corona Stage Academy.

Ross-Brown's acting debut was in the long-running successful British television series EastEnders and then films such as The Rainbow by Ken Russell. Whilst at stage school Claire became one of the first lingerie models for the well-known high street chain C & A.

After some years away from acting, where she focused on her studying, Claire then did a four-year stint as a head-hunter in Banking and Finance.

Claire then returned to the screen appearing in the cable TV show Agony (1999 TV series) in England. In 1999 Claire moved to Copenhagen, Denmark. She is known in Denmark for her role as Claire, in the Danish cult series Klovn which has been Denmark's most successful comedy ever, hence Claire's breakthrough into the Danish film and TV market. Claire stars alongside comedians Casper Christensen, Frank Hvam and actress Iben Hjejle.

As well as appearing in TV and films in Denmark and abroad, Ross-Brown has appeared as herself in shows such as "Come Dine with Me" (Danish: Til Middag Hos, Djævleræs and MasterChef) amongst others and is one of the main English voice-over artists in Denmark. Claire has appeared in films such as Love me Forever, Take the Trash out (Danish, Blå Mænd, Pisteleros and The Collector (Danish: Inkasso). In 2012 Claire appeared in In Real Life and The Stranger Inside. Claire is also the new face of "Intraceuticals" for 2012. In 2015 Claire went back into business with a start-up company, which led her at the end of 2016, to become the executive director of Fintech company CashWorks. In 2020 Claire started her own sustainable fashion and accessories brand called CJ London, the "CJ" is her full first name “Claire Julia”(cj-london.com). Claire continues to still act, making guest appearances in the Danish TV series “Friheden” and continues to combine her acting and business career.

== Other ==
In 2006 Claire was voted Denmark's sexiest actress by FHM. In 2008 she released a music album "Complexity", and as of 2012 Claire is the new face of "Intraceuticals". She is a trained kick-boxer and a long-distance runner. Claire is also board member and Ambassador for the children's charity "Children and Young in Need" and People 4 People - Human Trafficking. In 2018 Claire started writing for ”The International newspaper in Denmark with her own column, where she interviews prominent business leaders around the globe.

== Filmography ==
- In Real Life (2012 film) as Bella Hope
- Love Me Forever (2008 film) as Gloria
- Blå mænd-Take the Trash Out (2008 film) as Tine
- Pistoleros (film)] (2007 film) as Michelle
- The Black Pimpernel (2007 film) as Woman in fur

== Television ==
- Klovn (14 episodes, 2005–2006)- as Claire
- Agony (1999 TV series)...Various roles

== Music ==
- Complexity...2008
