= Andrea Elisabeth Rudolph =

Danish television and radio host

Andrea Elisabeth Rudolph (born 1 July 1976 in Vejen) is a Danish TV, radio host and founder of cosmetic company, Rudolph Care. Rudolph hosted the Danish version of the Dancing with the Stars franchise, for many years and has appeared as a guest judge on the show. Her cosmetics company focuses on products that meet the Ecolabel threshold.

== Biography ==
Rudolph was born on 1 July 1976, one of 5 children, in Jutland, Denmark. Rudolph's mother was a fashion designer and store owner. Her father, a teacher and farmer before also opening his own fashion brand store. Rudolph attended a home economics school in Vejen, before moving on to gain a postgraduate qualification in Journalism Her parents and grandparents had their own businesses and Rudolph's mother encouraged her to apply for an internship at P1 radio.

In 2012, she met former professional handball player Claus Møller Jakobsen, who was married at the time. On 2 January 2017, she married Claus Møller Jakobsen in a surprise ceremony at their sons christening at Frederiksberg Church. Between them, they have 5 children: Alfred & Arthur, Oskar & Alma (Claus children from previous relationship) & Isolde (her daughter from previous relationship with TV director, Jacob Houlind). On 4 June 2024 announced they would be getting divorced

In 2021, Rudolph was diagnosed with breast cancer aged 44 following Chemotherapy, Radiation therapy and surgery she was declared cancer-free. Through her Instagram account she encouraged followers to donate to the Danish Cancer Society and raised 1.4million DKK. She raised further funds via a Knæk Cancer Live event.

== Career ==
Rudolph began her career at with training as a radio host at DR Radio in 1998 and went on to host the radio show "Højtryk" in 2001. For 13 weeks, they broadcast the show from an office at the Maritime Centre in Svendborg, on P3 radio station alongside Jesper Baehrenz. The show consisted of challenges, set by listeners, in which Rudolph would have to attempt; these included parachuting, take a driving test and eating beef.

In 2002, she hosted the program Boogie on DR1 From 2004 to 2006 she was a co-host in the morning show Morgenhyrderne on Radio 100FM along with Lasse Rimmer and Lars Hjortshøj. Some news outlets reported that she left due to the stations unwillingness to pay her salary during maternity leave. In 2005, she co-hosted the TV show Vild med Dans (Dancing with the Stars) with Peter Hansen. She left the show temporarily due to pregnancy but returned for a number of seasons until 2014. In 2023 she returned as a guest judge on the show.

In 2006, Se og Hør published photos of Rudolph taken of her sunbathing topless on a beach; she successfully sued the magazine in 2010, at the Supreme Court, for breaching her privacy and they were ordered to pay her DKK 75,000.

In 2007 she returned to radio hosting at TV 2 Radio, alongside Lars Hjortshøj for a few months before quitting to work in television instead. In March 2025, she announced that she would be launching a podcast channel, Radio Rudolph

== Rudolph Care ==
In 2006, Rudolph took part in a research study with Greenpeace, while pregnant, in which they tested her blood for endocrine disruptors and chemicals. She discovered that many of the beauty products she was using were potentially harmful; this led her to deciding to create her own products which she insisted on being certified by Nordic Ecolabel With investment from her mother of 3 million DKK, she created Rudolph Care in 2009 and the following year it won Green Product of the Year in the "luxury" category at the Danish Beauty Awards. Rudolph Care has developed sunscreen products, Rudolph Sun & Rudolph Sun Kids in 2014, and a perfume range, Signature Notes, in 2017
