= Klown =

- Theatrical release poster
- Directed by: Mikkel Nørgaard
- Written by: Frank Hvam; Casper Christensen
- Produced by: Louise Vesth
- Starring: Frank Hvam; Casper Christensen
- Cinematography: Jacob Banke Olesen
- Edited by: Morten Egholm
- Music by: Kristen Eidnes Andersen
- Production company: Zentropa Productions
- Distributed by: Nordisk Film
- Release date: 16 December 2010
- Running time: 93 minutes
- Country: Denmark
- Language: Danish
- Box office: $12.4 million

Klown (Danish: Klovn - The Movie) is a 2010 Danish comedy film directed by Mikkel Nørgaard, and written by and starring Frank Hvam and Casper Christensen. It was developed from the successful Danish television series of the same name, in which Hvam and Christensen play fictionalized versions of themselves.

The film was released on 16 December 2010, to mostly positive response.

== Cast ==
- Frank Hvam as Frank
- Casper Christensen as Casper
- Marcus Jezz Petersen as Bo
- Mia Lyhne as Mia Christensen
- Iben Hjejle as Iben
- Lars Hjortshøj as Lars

== Release ==
Klown premiered in Denmark on 16 December 2010 and managed, during the two remaining weeks of December, to become the most watched Danish film of 2010.

By February 2011, the film had sold 848,500 total tickets in a nation with a population of 5.5 million, a figure comparable to the comedy films of Susanne Bier and Lone Scherfig ten years earlier.

The movie had its North American premiere at the Fantasia International Film Festival in Montreal in July 2011, where it won the Cheval Noir award. The film was also shown in the United States at the Fantastic Fest where it won as best picture and best screenplay in the Gutbuster comedy feature category.

In the autumn of 2011, it was sold for distribution in the United States to Drafthouse Films and 27 July 2012 it was given a limited North American release in Los Angeles, New York City and Austin as well as being available through video on demand services. The following weeks it expanded to several other theaters throughout the US.

== Reception ==
=== Critical reception ===
The comedy is based on "uncomfortable" humor featuring self-satire and humorous treatment of taboos. Reviews would often compare it to The Hangover and Curb Your Enthusiasm.

=== Accolades ===
Award	Category	Recipient	Result
Bodil Awards	Best Danish Film		Nominated
Fantasia International Film Festival	Best Feature Cheval Noir		Won
Fantastic Fest	Gutbuster Comedy Feature - Best Picture		Won
Fantastic Fest	Gutbuster Comedy Feature - Best Screenplay	Casper Christensen; Frank Hvam	Won
Oldenburg International Film Festival	German Independence Award - Audience Award		Nominated
Robert Awards	Audience Award		Won
Zulu Awards	Best Film		Won
Zulu Awards	Best Actor	Frank Hvam	Won
Zulu Awards	Best Actor	Casper Christensen	Nominated
Zulu Awards	Best Supporting Actor	Marcuz Jess Petersen	Won

== Sequels ==
A sequel, titled Klown Forever, was released in Denmark in 2015 and was released in the United States in late 2016. The first trailer was shown in front of Sausage Party screenings at Alamo Drafthouse theatres.

A third sequel, titled Klown: The Final, was released in Denmark on 20 January 2020.

== American adaptation ==
Warner Bros. has bought the rights to remake Klown with Todd Phillips named as a possible director with Danny McBride to star. On 3 November 2016, it was announced that Sacha Baron Cohen would headline the remake.
