= TV 2 Radio =

Denmark
- Broadcast area: Denmark

Programming
- Format: Music radio

Ownership
- Owner: TV 2 Denmark

History
- First air date: February 1, 2007
- Last air date: September 8, 2008

Technical information
- Repeater: 23

Links
- Webcast: http://tv2radio.dk
- Website: http://tv2radio.dk

TV 2 Radio was a Danish commercial radio station, set to compete with public financed stations DR P3 and DR P4. It began broadcasting at midnight, February 1, 2007. It ceased broadcasting September 8, 2008, and the frequencies were taken over by SBS Radio owned Nova FM.

Until November 14, 2007, the CEO of TV 2 Radio was former Venstre-politician Jens Rohde.

== Reception ==
TV 2 Radio was advertised greatly, primarily on TV 2, for their hosts instead of content, and this was said to be the reason for their poor first ratings, marking a share of 3.5 per cent in their first month of broadcast, lower than Sky Radio's starting share of 4.75 pct. In the age 21-50 share, where TV 2's goal was to reach a 15 per cent share at the end of the year, they have so far just reached 5.3 pct. - in comparison DR's P3 had 27.6 pct. Nevertheless, P3's share had gone down by 4.3 percentage points.

== Hosts ==
TV 2 Radio hosts
Host	Notes
Tina Bilsbo	TV personality
Mathias Buch	Former P3-host
Casper Christensen	TV and radio personality, stand-up comedian, former member of Tæskeholdet
Lars Daneskov	Former Jeopardy!- and P3-host
Mikala Dirckinck-Holmfeld	Former P3-host
Lars Hjortshøj	Former Radio 100FM-host. Comedian
Thomas Madvig	Former speaker/host of P3 and accomplished DJ
Camilla Miehe-Renard	TV personality
Jesper Monefeldt	
Niels Pedersen	
Thomas Qvortrup	Former NFL-commentator on TV 2 Zulu and a former P3-host.
Andrea-Elisabeth Rudolph	Former radio (P3 and 100FM) and TV host - on maternity leave when the radio starts
Ricco Wichmann	
Lisbeth Østergaard	Former P3-host

== Programming ==
The current programming is as follows (names in bold, hosts, where announced, in small-italic):

TV 2 Radio programming
Hours (24h)	00-06	06-07	07-08	08-09	09-10	10-11	11-12	12-13	13-14	14-15	15-16	16-17	17-18	18:00-18:30	18:30-19	19-20	20:00-20:30	20:30-21:00	21-22	22-23	23-00
**Weekdays**	**Non-stop**	**Alletiders Morgen**; Ulrik Aarhus & Gertrud Thisted Højlund			**Kontoret**; Lars Daneskov			**Frk. Ø** Lisbeth Østergaard		**Wichmann & Bonuseffekten**; Ricco Wichmann, Katrine Hertz Mortensen & Anders Bonde			**Nyhedsministeriet**; Thomas Qvortrup		**Madvig**; Thomas Madvig			**DJ**; Lars Hall		**24 timer på NEWS**	**Non-stop**
**Fridays**	**Non-stop**	**Alletiders Morgen**; Ulrik Aarhus & Gertrud Thisted Højlund			**Kontoret**; Lars Daneskov			**Frk. Ø** Lisbeth Østergaard		**Wichmann & Bonuseffekten**; Ricco Wichmann, Katrine Hertz Mortensen & Anders Bonde			**DJ**; Lars Hall			**Fredagsmix**; Thomas Madvig				**24 timer på NEWS**	**Non-stop**
**Saturdays**	**Non-stop**	**Alletiders Weekend**; Morten Mauritson, Ellen Maja Nybo, Steen Langeberg & Camilla Miehe-Renard							**DJ**; Lars Hall			**Non-stop**		NEWS PS:		**Non-stop**					
**Sundays**	**Non-stop**	**Alletiders Weekend**; Morten Mauritson, Ellen Maja Nybo, Steen Langeberg & Camilla Miehe-Renard							**DJ**; Lisbeth Østergaard			**DJ**; Niels Pedersen		**Non-stop**							
