= Rasmus Bjerg =

Danish actor, comedian and singer

- Born: Rasmus Bjerg; 28 July 1976 (age 49)
- Known for: P.I.S. - Politiets Indsats Styrke

Rasmus Bjerg (born 28 July 1976) is a Danish actor, comedian and singer.

He has enjoyed much success alongside Jonas Schmidt, in series like P.I.S. - Politiets Indsats Styrke, Wulffmorgenthaler, Dolph & Wulff and Jul i Verdensrummet.

He is mostly recognized in the comedy genre, but has also been seen in other genres. Rasmus Bjerg has also been featured in several commercials, such as Tuborg commercials and Lalandia commercials.

== Filmography ==
=== Film ===
- Møgunger (2003) .... Betjent Halding
- Princess (2006)
- Til døden os skiller (2007) .... Alf
- Frode og alle de andre rødder (2008) .... Vicevært
- Flame & Citron (2008) .... Smalle
- Rejsen Til Saturn (2008) .... Agent 2 (voice)
- Wall-E (2008) .... The Captain (Danish voice-over)
- Max Pinlig (2008) .... Carlo
- Oldboys (2009) .... Henrik B
- Parterapi (2010) .... Bo
- Nothing's All Bad (2010) .... Pornoshopindehaver
- Med lukkede øjne (2010) .... Michael
- All for One (2011) .... Timo
- Sover Dolly på ryggen? (2012) .... Laus
- Alle for to (2013) .... Timo
- Player (2013) .... Michael Helge
- Gentlemen (2014) .... Errol
- All Inclusive (2014) .... Henrik
- Iqbal & den hemmelige opskrift (2015) .... Æselmand
- Den magiske juleæske (2016) .... Krampus (voice)
- Iqbal & superchippen (2016) .... Æselmand
- Alle for tre (2017) .... Timo
- Sikke et cirkus: Det mystiske mysterium (2017) .... Cirkusdirektør Kaj
- Jeg er William (2017) .... Morbror Nils
- The Way to Mandalay (2018) .... John Mogensen
- A Fortunate Man (2018) .... Eybert
- Danmarks sønner (2019) .... Martin Nordahl
- Ser du månen, Daniel (2019) .... Tue Berg
- Gooseboy (2019) .... Togkontrollør
- Kollision (2019) .... Svendsen

=== Television ===
- P.I.S. - Politiets Indsats Styrke (2000–2001) .... Sebastian Dvorski
- Hotellet (2002) .... hotel guest
- Nikolaj og Julie (2003) .... akvariemand
- Ørnen: En krimi-odyssé (2004) .... John Holm Hasselbjerg
- Wulffmorgenthaler (2005) .... Loke / Bimmer / Sergeant Tolstrup / Leif "Kegle" Frandsen / John Ege / Munk Opani
- Dolph & Wulff (2005) .... Torben Asmussen / Mogens den næsvise kattekilling / Bimmer / Ronald / Lydmanden Rico / Vincent Albøl Andersen
- DR Julestuen (2005) .... Lågeåbneren Bruno
- Familien Teddy (2006) .... Mama Teddy (uncredited)
- Dolph & Wulff med venner (2006) .... Claus Halbæk / Kresten Bindesløv / Bimmer
- MGP - De unges Melodi Grand Prix (2006) .... Bruno
- Jul i Verdensrummet (2006) .... Klaus Ricardo
- Trio Van Gogh (2007)
- Hold Masken (2007) .... Himself
- Mr. Poxycat (2007) .... Jørgen Thomsen a.k.a. Mr. Poxycat
