= 63rd Bodil Awards =

2010 Danish film awards ceremony

- Date: 21 March 2010
- Site: Imperial Cinema, Copenhagen
- Hosted by: Lasse Rimmer

Highlights
- Best Film: Antichrist
- Best Actor: Willem Dafoe; Antichrist
- Best Actress: Charlotte Gainsbourg; Antichrist
- Most awards: Antichrist (5)
- Most nominations: Headhunter (5)

The 63rd Bodil Awards were held on 21 March 2010 in the Imperial Cinema in Copenhagen, Denmark, honouring the best national and foreign films of 2009. Lasse Rimmer hosted the event. Lars von Trier's Antichrist was the big winner, receiving both the awards for Best Danish Film, Best Actor (Willem Dafoe), Best Actress (Charlotte Gainsbourg), Best Cinematographer (Anthony Dod Mantle) and a Special Award to Eidnes Andersen for sound design. Deliver Us from Evil won both the awards for Best Supporting Actor (Jens Andersen (actor)) and Best Supporting Actress (Pernille Vallentin) while Headhunter which had come to the ceremony with the most nominations, five in three categories, left empty-handed. The documentary The Invisible Cell about The Blekinge Street Gang won the award for Best Documentary. Carsten Myllerup, Linda Krogsøe Holmberg and Jens Mikkelsen received a Bodil Honorary Award for their role in the foundation of the alternative film school Super16.

== Winners ==
- Bodil Honorary Award – Carsten Myllerup, Linda Krogsøe Holmberg and Jens Mikkelsen

Best Danish Film	Best Danish Documentary
Antichrist: Applause; Headhunter; Aching Hearts; Old Boys	The Invisible Cell
Best Actor	Best Actress
Willem Dafoe – Antichrist: Kristian Halken – Old Boys; Cyron Melville – Love & Rage; Lars Mikkelsen – Headhunter	Charlotte Gainsbourg – Antichrist: Lærke Winther Andersen – The Blessing; Stephanie León – Hush Little Baby; Malou Reymann – Hush Little Baby; Paprika Steen – Applause
Best Supporting Actor	Best Supporting Actress
Jens Andersen (actor) – Deliver Us from Evil: Michael Falch – Applause; Preben Harris – Headhunter; Henning Moritzen – Headhunter; Søren Pilmark – Headhunter	Pernille Vallentin – Deliver Us from Evil: Sara Hjort – Love & Rage; Charlotte Fich – Love & Rage; Solbjørg Højfeldt – The Blessing; Lea Høyer – Above the Street, Below the Water
Best Cinematographer	Bodil Special Award
Anthony Dod Mantle – Antichrist	Eidnes Andersen – Antichrist (Sound Design)
Best American Film	Best Non-American Film
Up: The Hurt Locker; Milk; Revolutionary Road; The Wrestler	Waltz with Bashir: Boy A; Il Divo; I've Loved You So Long; The Class

== See also ==
- 2010 Robert Awards
