= Trio Van Gogh =

Trio Van Gogh is a Danish sitcom, created by Rune Tolsgaard and Esben Pretzmann of Drengene fra Angora-fame. The series stars Mia Lyhne, Brian Lykke, Hjalte Flagstad, Jesper Rofeldt, Esben Pretzmann, Rune Tolsgaard, and also Simon Kvamm makes a short guest appearance.

The series is set as a documentary following the classical musical trio, Trio Van Gogh (a play on the name of the controversial Dutch director, Theo Van Gogh, who was murdered.) The trio struggles to break through, and they are faced with one disaster after another, due to all three members of the group being either incompetent, having troubles controlling their anger, or just plain stupid.

The series was broadcast in 11 episodes on DR2, the network that also broadcast several other Danish comedy successes like Casper & Mandrilaftalen, Wulffmorgenthaler, Dolph & Wulff, Drengene fra Angora etc.

== Casts ==
- Anette Lauritsen - Mia Lyhne
- Erik Trier - Hjalte Flagstad
- Miklos Raboszki - Brian Lykke
