= Morgenhyrderne =

- Genre: Morning show
- Running time: 6:00 AM to 9:20 AM
- Country of origin: Denmark
- Home station: Radio 100FM
- Original release: November 18, 2003 – September 28, 2007

Morgenhyrderne was a morning show on the Danish radio channel Radio 100FM. The show featured Lasse Rimmer, Lars Hjortshøj and Andrea Elisabeth Rudolph and broadcast every weekday morning.

The hosts discussed news stories - typically politics, gossip and music - and commented on them in a humorous way. Highlights from the show were repeated on Radio 100FM through the day and especially in the weekends.

== Cast ==
The original cast was Lasse Rimmer, Lars Hjortshøj and Andrea Elisabeth Rudolph.

In May 2006, Signe Muusmann came to replace Andrea Elisabeth Rudolph due to pregnancy and dissatisfaction with the terms of parental leave offered by Radio 100FM.

On 31 October 2006, Lars Hjortshøj resigned his position at Radio 100FM in favor of employment at TV2 Radio. In his place, Simon Jul Jørgensen began in early-January 2007.

== Awards ==
In 2005, the original cast was awarded the Danish Radio Prize.
