= Jesper Baehrenz =

Danish radio personality

Jesper Baehrenz (born 8 September 1965) is a Danish radio host, television host, producer, board game developer and screenwriter. In the 1990s he was a popular Danish radio and TV host, interviewing a wide range of Danish and international popstars.

Outside broadcasting, he has maintained a creative career as a concept developer, board game producer and screenwriter, often with his wife Mette Lisby through their production company, VIVE Productions.

== Youth and early radio career ==
Jesper Baehrenz was born in Herning, Denmark, where he became part of the de-nationalization of Danish radio at age 18, in the wave of new, private, local radio start-ups in 1983. Local station Radio Herning invited him, along with four other young people, to spend 15 minutes each week to talk about a particular music genre. Eventually, he got more and more air time on the growing station and would soon spend all his time outside his high school and preliminary business school studies producing and hosting radio.

When Danish radio entrepreneur Glenn Lau Rentius left Copenhagen radio station The Voice and launched a competing station, Radio Uptown, he invited then 22-year-old Jesper Baehrenz to Copenhagen to become the morning host and Program Director at the station – The youngest Program Director ever in Denmark.

Next, he hosted shows on the local TV station Kanal København, and was hired as a journalist at the monthly music magazine MIX, where he worked from 1988 to 1989. It was here that he met a popular DJ from the DR (The Danish National Broadcasting Corporation), Alex Nyborg Madsen. Baehrenz laid upon Madsen a criticism of the DR's most youth-oriented channel, P3, stating that the station should play more top 40 hits. Alex Nyborg Madsen reciprocated this challenge by asking Baehrenz to do a better job at P3 himself.

== DR ==
Jesper Baehrenz started working at P3 on the nightly broadcast Syveren, partnering with Danish DJ Kim Schumacher on a special part of the program focusing on new music. The same partnership continued in the program Studio 89, where Schumacher and Baehrenz took turns at hosting the show, which presented new tracks from around the world. Baehrenz quickly became involved in several projects at P3, especially on weekends, where he hosted shows such as Hit På Hit, Sport på 3’eren, and Ring et nummer. He also started the P3 interview show Kronsj.

Outside his radio career, he joined the team behind the TV3 dating show Knald eller Fald, hosted by TV host and singer Anders Frandsen, who was chosen to be the Danish entry for the 1992 Eurovision Song Contest. Jesper Baehrenz followed Frandsen, reporting from the international contest and producing the warm-up show on Danish TV.

== Strax ==
After hosting and producing several television music documentaries, and contributing to music show 3773-Hitservice, Jesper Baehrenz went back to radio, hosting daily P3 shows such as the early morning show Go'morgen P3 and the afternoon shows Maskinen and Strax, as well as the weekend program Varm Weekend.

Hosting Strax made Jesper Baehrenz a household name in Denmark, which led to more TV work, like hosting New Year's Eve shows and the quiz program Stjernetegn. He also played himself in movies such as Ernst og Lyset (1996) and Den Attende (1996).

== With a Z ==
In 1997 he developed and hosted big budget Saturday morning show "With a Z" on P3. The program was a live talk show with a studio audience, celebrity guests and a range of activities such as auctioning off paintings by popstars for charity.

== Tæskeholdet ==
During "With a Z", Baehrenz was also a co-hosting producer on "Tæskeholdet" Friday mornings on P3. The program was a series of crazy, chaotic live programs with comedians Casper Christensen, Jan Gintberg, Mads Vangsø and Søren Søndergaard. Tæskeholdet and With a Z were the two biggest radio successes in Denmark in 1997/1998.

Jesper Baehrenz spent 1998 producing television. Among other things, he joined the team behind the TV production of Jagten på Sandheden, hosted by comedic team Timm and Gordon.

== Højtryk and Millennium Broadcast ==
In 1999, Baehrenz developed and hosted the summer program Højtryk. The show was broadcast from towns across Denmark through the summer, bringing local events to national attention. Another series of Højtryk was commissioned in 2001.

Jesper Baehrenz co-hosted 1999/2000 New Year's Eve' show on DR with Natascha Crone. Later in 2000, he took the With a Z concept on a nationwide tour under the name Z-Up 2000.

== Marriage ==
In 2001, Jesper Baehrenz married television host, actor, screenwriter and stand-up comedian Mette Lisby in the Danish Sailor's Church in Singapore, where the couple was working on the 2001 edition of Højtryk.

In the following years Lisby and Baehrenz worked together on her standup DVD "One Woman Comedy" as well as "Knock Out", a talk show / interview program, based on the British concept Room 101.

== London ==
In 2005, Lisby and Baehrenz to London and formed the company VIVE Productions. Baehrenz still hosted top 40 radio shows, now on Danish Sky Radio, recorded in his own studio in London.

Through VIVE Productions, Lisby and Baehrenz developed entertainment concepts for other platforms, such as board games under the name "NoDice". Among other, the developed the "Master of" series for Nordisk Film in Scandinavia, and the board game based on the Danish TV comedy Klovn.

== Stephen K Amos ==
While living in London, Lisby and Baehrenz wrote material for two of comedian Stephen K. Amos' stand-up shows, "Stephen K. Amos Gets Next To You" and "Find The Funny".

== Los Angeles ==
In 2009 Lisby and Baehrenz moved to Los Angeles where they continue their activities through VIVE Productionssuch as a Scandinavian version of the Disney Channel sitcom "As The Bell Rings" (2010).
