= Mia Lyhne =

Danish actress (born 1971)

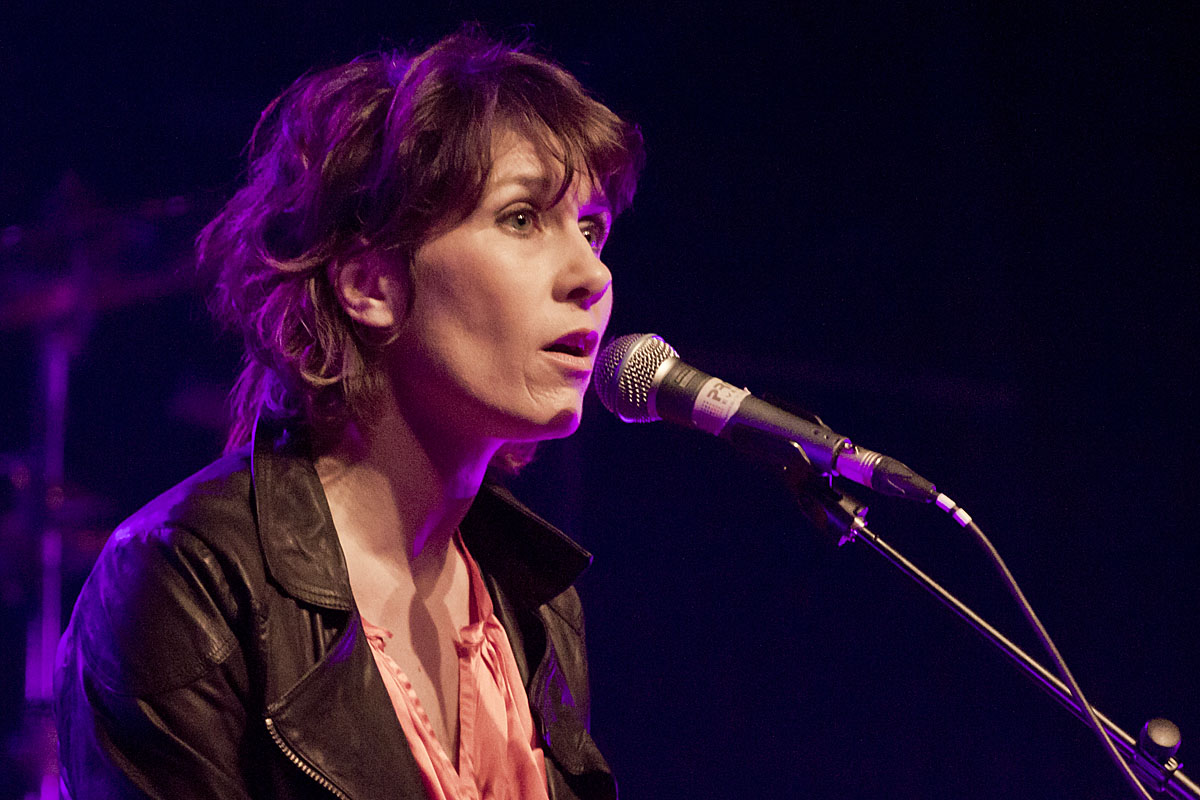
- Mia in 2013
- Born: 6 July 1971 (age 55); Copenhagen, Denmark
- Occupation: Actress
- Years active: 1997-present

Mia Lyhne (born 6 July 1971) is a Danish film and television actress. She came to the attention of a wider public after her participation in the 2005 first season of the Danish version of Dancing with the Stars, but she is probably best known for her role on the 2005-2009 Danish sitcom Klovn, playing Mia, the girlfriend of comedian Frank Hvam.

== Career ==
A self-taught actress, Lyhne began her TV career with small roles, including a segment in the Dansk Melodi Grand Prix 2004 in which she portrayed a very geeky Eurovision fanatic.

Lyhne has landed several movie and television roles since then, including one in Lars von Trier's Direktøren for det Hele (The Boss of it All), one of the lead characters in the Danish sitcom Trio Van Gogh, and a role in the Danish adaptation of the play Who's Afraid of Virginia Woolf?, with Nikolaj Lie Kaas.

In the broadcast of TV 2's Zulu Awards 2012, Lyhne presented the award for the Best Film of the Year, joined by her Klovn co-star Casper Christensen, who presented the Best Live Performance of the Year prize.

== Filmography ==
Film Title	Role	Year
Sover Dolly på ryggen (post-production)		2012
Lærkevej - til døden os skiller	Karina	2012
Klown (Danish: Klovn - The Movie)	Mia	2012
Hash (video)	Christians mor/Majorens kone (voice)	2010
Smukke mennesker	Vivian	2010
Camping	Connie Nielsen	2009
Blå mænd	Karen - AF dame	2008
Hjemve	Ulla	2007
Den sorte Madonna	Liz	2007
Fidibus	Sidse	2006
Direktøren for det hele	Heidi A.	2006
Familien Gregersen		2004
Forbrydelser	Tina	2004
De grønne slagtere	Journalist	2003
Vildfarelser (Short Film)	Annabel	1998

== Television ==
TV Show Title	Role	Year
A-klassen	Camilla Nielsen / Camilla	2012
4x1	Connie	2011
Hjælp, det er jul	Birthe	2011
Klovn	Mia	2005–2026
Album	Katja Rolsted	2008
Trio Van Gogh	Anette	2007
Krøniken	Lisbet Knudsen	2005
Er du skidt, skat?	Lisetta Antonbergsdöttir, dokumentarist	2003
Udvidelse af kampzonen	Catherine	2002
Perforama	Charlotte	2002
Kaos i opgangen	Servetrice	1997
