= Langt fra Las Vegas =

Danish TV sitcom

- Created by: Casper Christensen; Frank Hvam
- Directed by: Jonas Elmer (21 episodes); Mikkel Nørgaard (15 episodes); Jarl Friis-Mikkelsen (13 episodes); Pia Bovin (4 episodes)
- Starring: Casper Christensen; Frank Hvam]; Iben Hjejle
- Country of origin: Denmark
- No. of episodes: 53

Production
- Running time: 25 Minutes

Original release
- Network: TV 2 Zulu
- Release: 27 February 2001 – 25 November 2003

Langt fra Las Vegas ("far from Las Vegas") is a Danish sitcom, which was first aired on the Danish TV channel TV2 Zulu. It revolved around life at a newly started TV morning show, Jump Start, and focused on the life of the main character, Casper (played by Casper Christensen).

Langt fra Las Vegas consisted of 53 episodes, aired over 5 seasons with each episode lasting 25 minutes. It ran from 2001 to 2003.

== Overview ==
The sit-com takes places in the studio and offices of fictional TV channel show Jump Start and in the main character Casper's apartment, both located in Copenhagen, Denmark.

Generally the main story revolves around Casper (in later seasons referred to as by his full name, Casper Christensen) who is usually in trouble and tries to fix it with a lie, but always ends up getting caught. Issues of relationships and sex are often central to the show, and topics such as paedophilia and other taboos are touched upon often with a rich imagery (mainly by Casper's boss Niels Buckingham). The show originated on a cable-channel targeting young adults (TV2 Zulu) and successfully made it to the parent, nationwide channel TV2 without any censoring.

The city of Las Vegas is never featured nor even mentioned in Langt fra Las Vegas, possibly a reference to the lack of professionalism and showmanship of the characters.

The show drastically changed tone from season 1 to 2. Two characters, Wulff and Anne, were completely written out, and several characters returned with their personalities completely changed, such as Kenny being changed from the office smart-ass to a geeky character; Robert being changed from a childish security chief to a seemingly retarded cameraman; and Niels Buckingham, who had been an off-beat character whose sexual deviances were often briefly mentioned, being amplified into a full-blown pervert with every conceivable sexual fetish.

== Characters ==
- Casper Christensen – Casper Christensen (Season 1-5)
  - Casper is a young man working as a host/comedian on an unspecified TV-show on the TV channel "Jump Start". Throughout the series he battles with relationships which he sometimes takes very seriously and at other times views with indifference or engages himself with women out of spite (of former or to-be girlfriends) or in search of sex. He is light tempered and forgiving but often childishly stubborn and a (self proclaimed?) sex symbol.
- Kenny Nickelman - Frank Hvam (Season 1-5)
  - Kenny is Casper's best friend. The first season aside, he is a sports journalist on the TV channel "Jump Start". He is usually impeccably dressed in outfits meant for much older or more distinguishable men (tweed, caps, suspenders etc.). Often in bad luck and quite a geek, he is in many ways the complete opposite of Casper.
- Niels Buckingham - Klaus Bondam (Season 1-5)
  - Niels is an anchor-man at the TV channel "Jump Start" and from season 2 and onwards the CEO of the station. Niels has worked as a foreign correspondent throughout his seemingly long career and often regales in absurd stories from his experiences. He is a blatant pervert with many sexual fetishes, including some illegal ones such as paedophilia and necrophilia. Additionally, he also has various extreme or elaborate fetishes which he often hints at in a rather obvious language. He is also very outspoken about non-sexual intimacies, such as bowel-movements (in one episode he ceremoniously informs the staff that he has diarrhea and then confines himself to his office, ordering Robert to fetch him a large bowl and some old newspapers, his preferred brand of toiletpaper etc.). Niels continuously finds himself in embarrassing situations but sometimes fails to see the problem. At other times he is quite vain.
- Liva Eberhardt - Iben Hjejle (Season 2-5)
  - On-off girlfriend of Casper. An architect by trade but is later hired as a chief of public relations at the TV channel "Jump Start". Is very intelligent, caring and openminded of some things, but obliviously not to the problems of others, in particular Casper's.
- Lisa Bremer Harris - Katja K (Season 1-5)
  - Lisa is a secretary at the TV channel "Jump Start". In real life, Katja K was a porn star before being cast for the role as Lisa, a fact that is played upon in the pilot. She is the most sensible and stable person on the Jump Start staff and has frequent run-ins with Robert, her direct opposite.
- Robert Dølhus - Lars Hjortshøj (Season 1-5)
  - Robert is a cameraman and video-editor on the TV-channel "Jump Start". He is practically a child in a grown person's body, lives on candy and junk food and is constantly making childish references to breasts. Is the favored Guinea pig of Niels who often experiments with different things on Robert or gives him absurd tasks, almost always to Roberts annoyance. Robert is a hi-fi enthusiast - purist even.
- Kim Dorowsky - Sofie Stougaard (Season 1-5)
  - Kim is at first the chief at the TV channel "Jump Start", but after season one resigns to write a book on boxing. Is briefly married to Casper (unhappily). She is often very hippie like, and have a very free mind on the world, and life in general. In season 2 she is pregnant, for a short while. The father of the child is then shown to be a 16 year old, who she met at a club. Kim often shows the less glamour of female life, such as periods, lactating and such.
- Wulff - Mikael Wulff (Season 1)
  - Wulff is only a part of Jumpstart during the first season. He is a very nervous and sometimes distracted character, who dont really pay attention to what is goin on around him. it is revealed he get super powers, if he smells permanent fluid and thus become "Sunny boy" the super hero. His parents are deaf, and have somewhat neglected him during his childhood.
- Anne - Stine Stengade (Season 1)
  - Anne is Caspers first recurring love interest in season 1. She works as a nurse, and have a very different way of life, then Casper does. She prefers books over television. She proves really difficult for Casper to get into a relationship, and she is easy to upset, with a wrong comment or action. She also shows some questionable choices, such as dating a biker, and making Casper store all the Bikers "stolen" hardware. In the end of season 1, she starts dating Casper, but she breaks up with him, during the first episode of season 2, which throws Casper into a spiral of despair.

=== Regular guest cast ===
- Mogens Knibbe Eberhardt - Henning Jensen
  - Authoritative father of Liva. An MD by trade and a very orthodox one at that. Cares immensely for Liva's well-being and is very suspicious of Casper and his motives with Liva.
- Vibeke Eberhardt - Solbjerg Højfeldt
  - Seemingly submissive wife of Mogens and mother of Liva. Is often being bullied by husband Mogens who, however, loves her dearly.

== Episodes ==
=== Season one ===
1. En Ordentlig Sneppetur (A Big Sandpiper Trip)
2. Trillekød (Ground Beef)
3. Danish Dynamite
4. Ordnung Muss Sein
5. Kærlighedspokalen (The Love Cup)
6. Proletarkæden (Proletarian's Chain)
7. Sexfreak
8. Se & Hor (Watch & Fornicate)
9. Heidi (Del 1)
10. Heidi (Del 2)
11. En på Egnsdragten (One On The Region's Suit)
12. IT Phone Home
13. Helmig Fucki Fucki

=== Season two ===
1. Lars Herlow
2. Mia Hundvin
3. John Travolta
4. Mek Pek
5. Mufufu
6. Michel
7. Liva
8. Mogens K. Eberhart
9. Monsieur Dipp
10. Oliver

=== Season three ===
1. Feng Shui
2. Kat (Cat)
3. Laust
4. Polle Pot
5. Bedste, det er bare mig (Granny, It's Just Me)
6. Tis (Pee)
7. Jeopardy
8. Kærlighed gør blind (Love Is Blind)
9. Som søn så far (As Father As Son)
10. Det sidste ord (The Last Word)

=== Season four ===
1. Pressemødet (The Press Conference)
2. Don't Wanna Lus You Now
3. Starfucker
4. Mere møs til Dennis (More Kisses For Dennis)
5. Tino, Gunnar og en hel krukke bolsjer (Tino, Gunnar And A Whole Jar Of Candy)
6. Ultimate Kosher
7. Arrivederci Kenny
8. Nestor
9. Trøstepagten (The Pact Of Comfort)
10. Kammeratstolen (The Companion Chair)

=== Season five ===
1. Skat (Tax)
2. DVD-aftener (DVD Nights)
3. Den forsølvede barnesko (The Silver-Plated Children's Shoe)
4. Hvem ka' Lie Kaas (Who Likes Lie Kaas)
5. Picaspero
6. Onani
7. Who's Your Daddy
8. Herretur (Man's Trip)
9. Kim og femidomet (Kim And The Female Condom)
10. Et fister øjeblik (A Fister Moment)
