= Anders Morgenthaler =

Danish writer

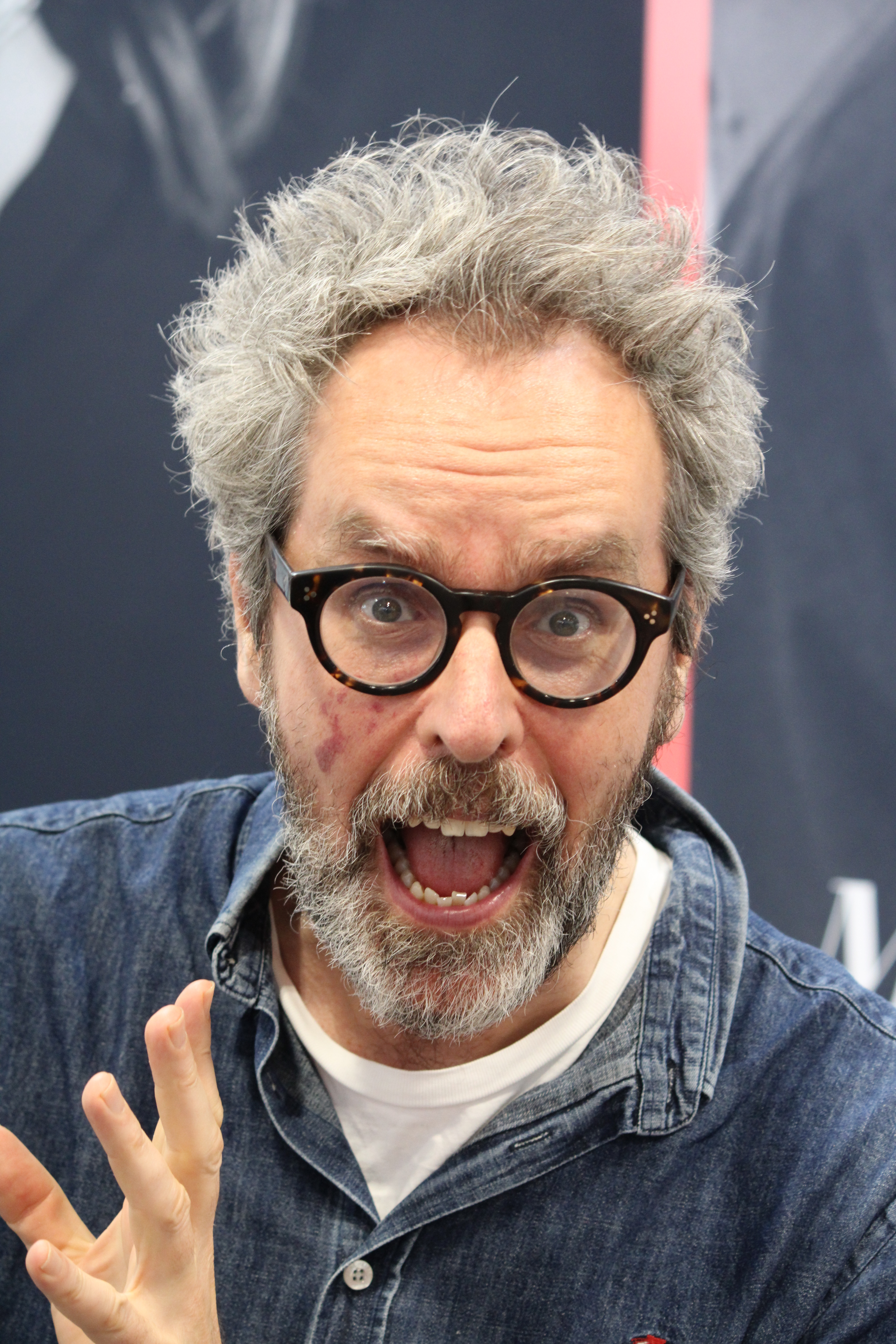
- Morgenthaler in 2025
- Born: 5 December 1972 (age 53) Copenhagen, Denmark
- Areas: Artist, writer, animator, film director
- Notable works: Wulffmorgenthaler; Dolph
- Awards: Nordisk Film Award, 2006

Anders Morgenthaler (born 5 December 1972) is a Danish comics artist, children's book author, animator and film director.

== Biography ==
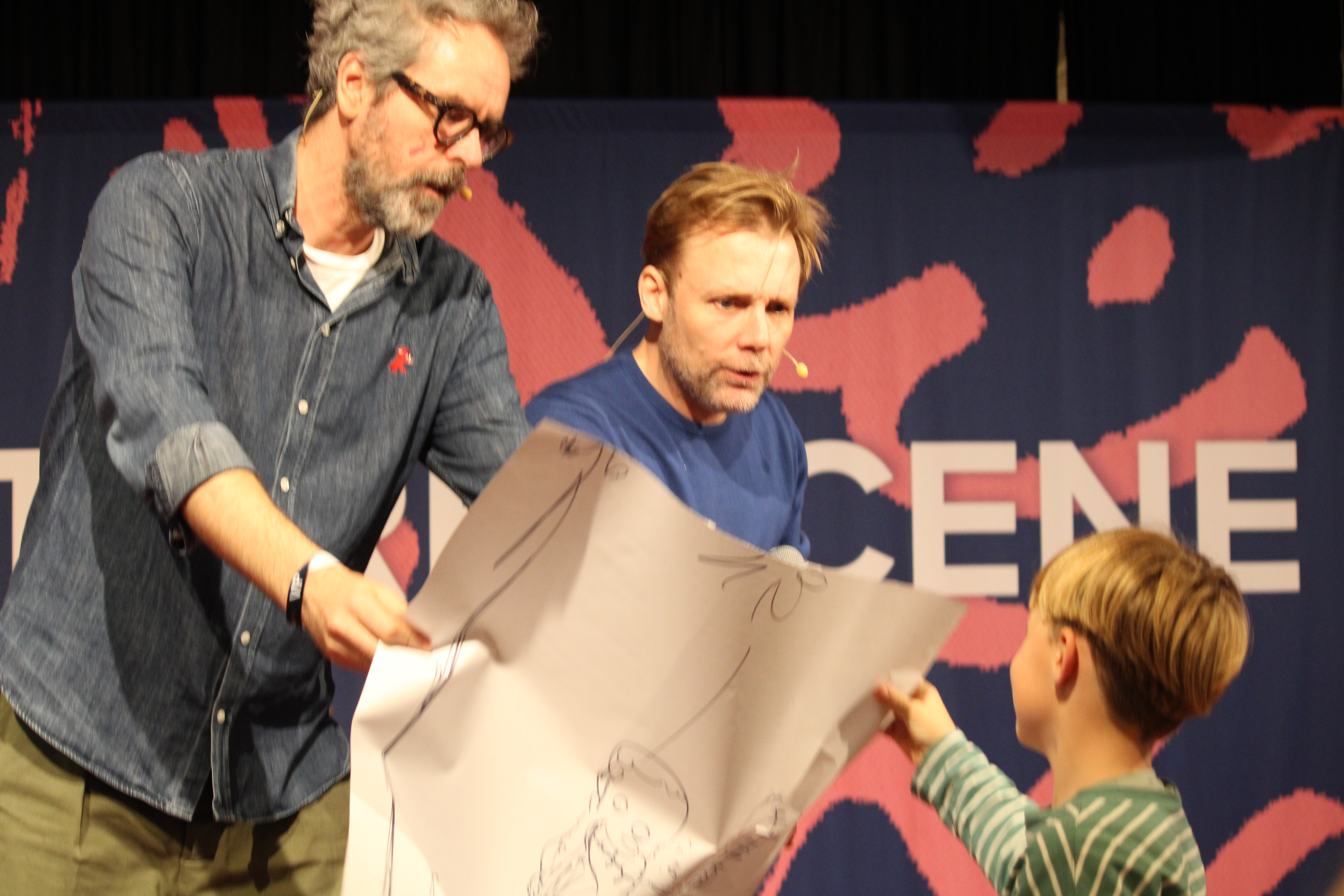
With Mikael Wulff at Bogforum 2025 in Bella Center

Morgenthaler is a graduate of Designskolen Kolding and the National Film School of Denmark. Having worked as a TV host on the Danish TV channel DR's children's show KatjaKaj og BenteBent, and directed several music videos, he eventually directed the feature film Princess in 2006, earning him a Nordisk Film Award.

Prior to this, comic strip Wulffmorgenthaler produced in collaboration with comedian Mikael Wulff, brought attention and success in 2001. A comic strip competition entry named Kalzone, completed few hours before the entry deadline, submitted under the pseudonym Pernille Richter Andersson, led to victory in the competition, and a one-month run in the national newspaper Politiken. The strip became a regular feature on DR's internet culture portal in 2002, and in October 2003 it became a daily newspaper strip in Politiken. Due to the unusually uninhibited and adult nature of the strip, this led to disgruntled reader reactions and cancelled subscriptions for Politiken, but the strip remained. It later became syndicated to Swedish tabloid newspaper Aftonbladet in 2006. English versions of the strip also feature as a popular webcomic, and TV shows centered on the recurring character Dolph, a blue fascist hippopotamus, has been produced in various incarnations on DR.

== Bibliography ==
- Wulffmorgenthaler (with Mikael Wulff)
  - 1. Se, uden hænder! (Look, No Hands!) (2003, Politikens forlagshus, ISBN 87-91293-77-4)
  - 2. Ups... (Whoops...) (2004, Politikens forlagshus, ISBN 87-91518-74-1)
  - 3. Underholdning for hele familien! (Fun for the Whole Family!) (2005, Politikens forlagshus, ISBN 87-567-7909-7)
  - 4. Smukke oplevelser i naturen (The Beauty of Nature) (2006, Politikens forlagshus, ISBN 87-567-8240-3)
- Morgenthalers Dyrefabler (Morgenthaler's Animal Fables)
  - Baobabtræet (2005, Politikens forlagshus, ISBN 978-87-567-7563-2)
  - Bjarnes tænder (2005, Politikens forlagshus, ISBN 978-87-567-7559-5)

== Filmography ==
- Araki: The Killing of a Japanese Photographer (2003, short film)
- Raunchy - Watch Out (2004, music video)
- Princess (2006)
- Echo (2007)
- The Apple and the Worm (Æblet og Ormen, 2009)
- The ABCs of Death - K is for Klutz (2013, short film)
- I Am Here (2014)
- Mugge and the Street Party (2019)

== Awards ==
- 2006: The Nordisk Film Award
