= Casper & Mandrilaftalen =

Danish television sketch show

- Logo of the show Design: Kristof Kuncewicz
- Also known as: Mandrilaften; Mandrillen
- Genre: Surreal humor, satire, sketch comedy
- Created by: Casper Christensen
- Written by: Casper Christensen; Lasse Rimmer; Frank Hvam; Lars Hjortshøj
- Starring: Casper Christensen; Lasse Rimmer; Frank Hvam; Lars Hjortshøj; Anders Matthesen; Uffe Holm; Jan Gintberg; Sebastian Dorset; Al Agami; Anders Lund Madsen; Anette Toftgård; John Cleese; Mick Øgendahl; Pelle Møller; Thomas Milton
- Opening theme: Komm Wieder by Andreas Dorau
- Ending theme: En TV-baron by Jan Glæsel
- Composer: Jan Glæsel
- Country of origin: Denmark
- Original language: Danish
- No. of seasons: 2
- No. of episodes: 67 (1999) + a special episode (2003)

Production
- Producers: Jens Svalgaard; Niels Severin
- Running time: Approx. 30 minutes (per episode)
- Production company: Metronome Productions A/S
- Budget: <100,000 DKK (per episode)

Original release
- Network: DR
- Release: 1 March – 19 November 1999

Related
- Casper & Drengene fra Brasilien (1999); Fisso (2003); Zulu Royal (2003-2006)

Casper & Mandrilaftalen, also known as Mandrilaftalen or Mandrillen, is a Danish Dadaist and satirical cult television sketch show that originally aired on DR2 from 1 March to 19 November 1999 across two seasons, comprising a total of 67 episodes. The Mandrilaftalen group consists of Danish comedians Casper Christensen, Lasse Rimmer, Lars Hjortshøj and Frank Hvam. Heavily inspired by British humor, the show became known for its eccentric characters and absurd sketches, leading to multiple TV critics comparing it to Monty Python's Flying Circus. The show is of a talk show format and is hosted by the character Casper, who is a fictionalization of and is played by the program's creator, Christensen. As the star of the show, Casper usually sits at his desk while satirizing the Danish media industry and interviewing fictional guests. Surreal nonsense is a recurrent characteristic of the show, an example being the character Broder Salsa, who folds carpets to resemble great state leaders and sorts capital cities by muesli. In the show, Casper also holds talent shows with fictional participants, presents episodes of fictional TV series and displays advertisements for fictional products. Rimmer, Hjortshøj and Hvam plays an array of various characters, and the show has guest appearances from other Danish comedians, the British Monty Python member John Cleese, the Danish actress Susse Wold, the rapper Al Agami, to name a few. More than 250 different named fictional characters appear in the show, with Broder Salsa, Svenne O'Lotta and Gentleman Finn being the most popular characters according to Christensen.

The show was produced on a tiny budget in a garage on Amager, Copenhagen. Every episode lasts about half an hour and was written, recorded, edited, and broadcast in approximately 14 hours. The manuscript for an episode was written in the morning, followed by the episode being recorded and edited in four hours at most in the afternoon and finally driven to DR by taxi, from where it was broadcast at 11:30 pm. All sketches were recorded chronologically and edited together along the way. The show was a counterreaction to contemporary television programs, which the group considered to be monotonous and poor entertainment. The show had very low viewing figures, which was attributed to its undesirable airing time at 11:30 pm on weekdays as well as DR2's limited national coverage. However, the show received universal acclaim from Danish TV critics and won the prize for Best Entertainment at the Danish TV Prisen in 2000. The show quickly grew a cult following, which led to the launch of multiple fan sites and fan clubs as well as bestselling DVD and VHS releases between 2002 and 2004. In the months after the end of the show, the group toured the country with eight sold-out live shows based on the episodes. They also recorded the spin-off Christmas calendar Casper & Drengene fra Brasilien in less than two days in November 1999. DR2 has since rerun Mandrilaftalen several times, and the show has been referred to as one of the absolute peaks of Danish satire. In 2008, all episodes of the show were digitized and released on DR's archive website, DR Bonanza, where they can be watched free of charge from anywhere around the world.

== Background ==
Casper & Mandrilaftalen was a surrealistic comedy sketch and talk show hosted by Casper Christensen. The show was created by Christensen and two other Danish comedians Lasse Rimmer and Lars Hjortshøj. Frank Hvam later joined the program. Many prominent Danish comedians were occasionally part of the program, e.g. Jan Gintberg, Anders Matthesen, Mick Øgendahl, Uffe Holm, Sebastian Dorset, and Anders Lund Madsen.

The English comedian John Cleese also made an appearance in one episode, as "Bosse" who pretends to be coach of the Denmark national football team. This was a nod to the influence Monty Python had on the show.

Episodes were typically written in the morning, filmed in the afternoon, and shown the same evening without much editing being done. This added to the impromptu humor of the show.

The first 48 episodes of the show aired on Monday, Wednesday, and Friday at 11:30 pm during the first six months of 1999. The next 19 episodes were shown on Wednesday and Friday in the second half of 1999.

In 2003, the four comedians met again and made a new episode called "Fisso". It was released on the second DVD (2006 re-release: third DVD) of Casper & Mandrilaftalen.

== Format ==
The show revolved around Casper Christensen as the host of what was, ostensibly, a mix of a current events show, a talk show and a variety show, and the other comedians as guests and crew of the show, with occasional guest performers and cameos by the actual crew. Christensen also introduced the sketches in the show. The guest were always very strange and abnormal characters, and the humor was very surreal.

== Recurring characters ==
The show featured many fictional guests, usually interviewed by Casper Christensen in an "absurd talkshow" style. They were usually played by the Mandril crew. While many characters appeared only once, some would re-appear in many episodes.

- Frank Hvam as Bjarne Goldbæk
- Frank Hvam as Gentleman Finn
- Frank Hvam as Sidney Kreutzfeldt
- Frank Hvam as Kresten Pikhår
- Frank Hvam as Klaas Gynhjalter
- Frank Hvam and Lars Hjortshøj as Rulle & Cromwell
- Lars Hjortshøj as Broder Salsa
- Lars Hjortshøj as Claes-Jacob Baumspieler a.k.a. Jens-Jacob Baumspieler
- Lars Hjortshøj as Thore Ellen Hanhøj
- Lars Hjortshøj as Smokey Spartacus
- Lars Hjortshøj as Peter Schmeichel
- Lars Hjortshøj as Ebenezer Kvasthval
- Lasse Rimmer as Wesley Snipes
- Lasse Rimmer as Pelle Klumpfeber
- Lasse Rimmer as Svenne O'lotta
