= Claus Møller Jakobsen =

Danish handball player (born 1976)

Personal information
- Nationality: Danish
- Born: 24 September 1976 (age 50) Ringkøbing, Denmark
- Height: 1.94 m (6 ft 4 in)

Sport
- Sport: Handball
- Position: Centre back

Senior clubs
- Years: Team
- 1991-2000: Skjern Håndbold
- 2000-2004: BM Altea
- 2004-2006: BM Ciudad Real
- 2006-2008: Ademar León
- 2008-2009: Portland San Antonio
- 2009-2014: Skjern Håndbold
- 2016: TMS Ringsted
National team
Years	Team	Apps	(Gls)
1998-2007	Denmark	121	(149)
Medal record
Men's handball
Representing Denmark
World Championship
Bronze medal – third place	2007 Germany	Team
Junior World Championship
Gold medal – first place	1997 Turkey	Team

Claus Møller Jakobsen (born 24 September 1976) is a Danish retired former professional handballer and current sports commentator for TV2.

== Career ==
Møller Jakobsen began his professional handball career in Skjern Håndbold. Here he won the Danish championship in 1999. This was the first a newly promoted team won the Danish championship, and also the first title in the history of the club. He also won the Danish Men's Handball Cup in 2000. He was later signed by Spanish clubs BM Ciudad Real. He won EHF Champions League with the club in 2006. He later continued his career in Portland San Antonio. In 2009, he returned to Denmark to play for Skjern Håndbold. In his first season back at the club he was league topscorer in the Danish league. When his contract at Skjern expired, he retired from handball.

In 2016 he made a short comeback for TMS Ringsted in the 1st Division at the age of 40.

He played his first national game on September 23, 1998, and has scored 149 goals in 121 games. In 2007 he won bronze medals with the Danish team at the 2007 World Championship.

== Post-playing career ==
After ending his active handball career, Møller Jakobsen has worked as a sports commentator for TV2.

== Personal life ==
Møller Jakobsen was born in Ringkøbing. He has been in a relationship with the journalist and businesswoman Andrea Elisabeth Rudolph since 2012 and they married at Frederiksberg Church in January 2017. They have two children together and Møller Jakobsen has two children from a previous marriage while Rudolph has a daughter from a previous relationship. They live in the Frederiksberg district of Copenhagen and have a second home in Aarhus.

== Honours ==
- EHF Champions League:
  - Gold: 2006
- EHF Men's Champions Trophy:
  - Gold: 2005, 2006
- ASOBAL Cup:
  - Gold: 2005, 2006
- Supercopa ASOBAL:
  - Gold: 2005
