= Mette Lisby =

Mette Lisby (born 5 April 1968) is a Danish writer, actress, stand-up comedian, and television host.

She currently resides with her husband and business partner, Jesper Baehrenz, in Los Angeles, where she works on creative writing through their company VIVE Productions. Recently, Lisby and Baehrenz created and wrote the Scandinavian adaptation of the popular Disney teen sitcom ‘As the Bell Rings’.

== Danish career ==
Mette Lisby was one of the few women who were part of the birth of the Danish stand-up comedy scene in the early nineties. She made her debut, along with many of the other big names in Danish stand-up comedy, at Din’s in 1992 In 1994, she became the co-host of the talent show “Out of the Closet” / “Ud af skabet”, and later, she hosted the game show “Star Joker” / “Stjernejoker”.

From 1996 to 1997, she hosted the popular talk show “Walk the Plank” / “Linen Ud”, making her a popular TV hosts. She then began hosting the Danish version of the British satirical news program Have I Got News for You, called “Ugen Der Gak” in Danish.

Both “Walk the Plank” / “Linen Ud” and “Have I Got News for You” / “Ugen Der Gak” were popular shows, which had audiences of over one million viewers – one fifth of the Danish population of five million people.

Mette Lisby won several awards in 1997 and 1998. She was voted “Favorite TV Host” by the Danish television audiences both years, and won major newspaper Ekstra Bladet’s award for best TV personality of 1998.

In 1999, she created the sketch show “FC Lisby”, taking the lead role as both host and head writer. Many of Denmark’s leading stand-up comedians contributed to and appeared on the show.

== Film career ==
Also, in 1999, Lisby landed her first serious role in motion picture. This was “The Two-Penny Dance” / “Klinkevals” produced by the Academy Award - winning producer Per Holst. The movie was a smash hit with Danish audiences and Mette Lisby was nominated for a Robert award – the Danish equivalent of an Academy Award - in the ‘Best Female Performance in a Lead Role’ category.

In 2000, she repeated her role in the sequel to the movie, “Juliane”, which was nominated for a Robert award for Movie of the Year. She also took the lead in the spin-off TV-series "Juliane", which got the highest TV ratings for a drama on Danish television in 2001.

Also in 2001, Mette Lisby took her gift for comedy on the road with her sold-out ‘One Woman Comedy Tour’, which not only sold a lot of tickets, but also garnered rave reviews in the Danish press. A DVD recording of the tour went platinum the following year.

In 2004, she was once again put in charge of a popular talk show, this time the Danish version of the British hit show Room 101 which was called “Knock Out” in the Danish version.

== Going abroad ==
In 2005, Mette Lisby expanded her career by moving to London together with her husband, popular TV and radio host Jesper Baehrenz, whom she had married in 2001. The couple started the creative production company VIVE Productions, which develops TV concepts, scripts for TV and film, as well as developing and writing material for comedians. The company also has a game division, which creates board games for the Danish and international markets. “No Dice Board Games”, as the division is called, has sold over 500.000 games worldwide.

In London, Mette Lisby continued her career as a performing stand-up comedian, with appearances at clubs such as The Comedy Store, Leicester Square Theatre, Tattershall Castle, Storm, Comedy Tree, Brou-Ha-Ha, Comedy Café, Club 99, Electric Mouse, Latchmere Theatre, King’s Head Theatre, Comedy Camp, Phil Nichols’ Old Rope venue, and at the Royal Comedy Gala 2008.

She has performed at the Edinburgh Fringe Festival in 2006 and 2008, as well as the Amsterdam International Comedy Festival, and Brighton Comedy Festival and The Big Joke Festival.

In 2007 and 2008, she appeared on the BBC / Comedy Central show “The World Stands Up”, as well as the “Last Comic Standing” competition on NBC in the US.

== Writing ==
Recently, Mette Lisby has focused on the writing part of her career. Since 2005, she has been a regular columnist in the weekly newspaper "Soendagsavisen" in Denmark. A collection of Lisbys columns was published as a book in 2007.

In London Mette Lisby wrote comedy material for Stand Up comedian Stephen K. Amos. Two of Amos’ shows, “Stephen K Amos Gets Next to You” and “Stephen K Amos – Find The Funny” was co-written by Lisby and Baehrenz. Lisby and Baehrenz also produced and provided material for Amos’ show at the Edinburgh Fringe Festival, “Stephen K Amos’ Weekend Chat Show”.

== Move to Los Angeles ==
In 2009, Mette Lisby and husband Jesper Baehrenz relocated to Los Angeles to further expand their creative writing and conceptual creation endeavors. From here, they created the Scandinavian adaptation of the popular Disney sitcom ‘As the Bell Rings’,
