= Lasse Rimmer =

Danish stand-up comedian

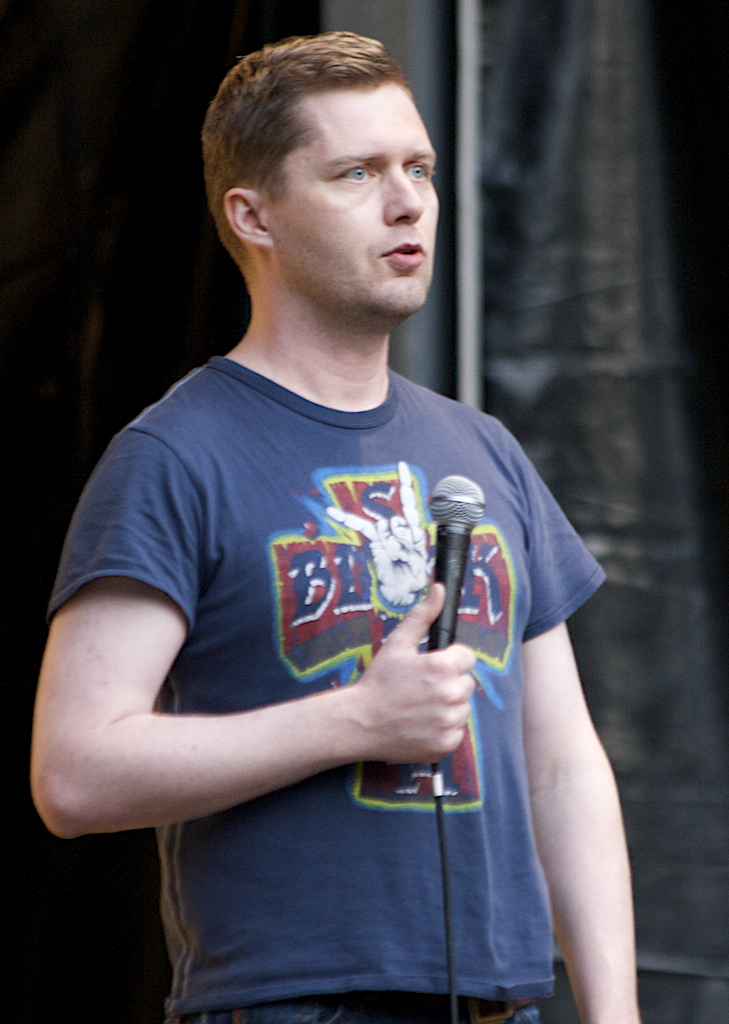
- Lasse Rimmer performing in Aalborg, Denmark, June 2009
- Born: Aarhus, Denmark
- Occupations: Stand-up comedian; television and radio host; actor
- Website: lasserimmer.dk

Lasse Rimmer Nielsen is a Danish stand-up comedian, actor and television and radio host. Rimmer was born in Aarhus.

== Career ==
Rimmer made his first appearance as a stand-up comedian in 1993 at Café Din's in Copenhagen and participated in DM i Stand-Up (Danish Championship in Stand-up) in the same place in October 1993.

He wrote and took part in DR2's Casper & Mandrilaftalen in 1999 and later hosted the quiz program Jeopardy! for almost four years, from January 2000 to November 2003.

From 18 November 2003 he was co-host of Radio 100FM's morning show Morgenhyrderne, first along with Lars Hjortshøj (since replaced by Simon Jul) and Andrea Elisabeth Rudolph (since replaced by Signe Muusmann), and as of May 2007 still is.

Rimmer has been a presenter for events such as the Danish stand-up charity show Talegaver til børn and Studenterlaugets Commerciel Awards 2004.

== Education ==
Rimmer graduated from Greve Gymnasium. He studied film studies at University of Copenhagen, but dropped out. He also attempted to be admitted to The Danish National School of Performing Arts, but did not get accepted. He originally considered studying theology.

== Filmography ==
=== Film ===
Year	Title	Role	Note(s)	Ref(s).
2008	Rejsen til Saturn	TV Journalist & Gert	Voice role	
2009	Deliver Us from Evil	Johannes		
2011	Jensen & Jensen	Speaker	Voice role	
2014	Mr. Peabody & Sherman (Danish dub)	Mr. Peabody	Voice role	
2014	Planes: Fire & Rescue (Danish dub)	Cad Spinner	Voice role	
