= Niels Arden Oplev =

Danish film director and screenwriter (born 1961)

- Born: 26 March 1961 (age 65); Oue, Mariagerfjord Municipality, Denmark
- Occupations: Film director; screenwriter

Niels Arden Oplev (pronounced [ˈne̝ls ˈɑˀtn̩ ˈʌple̝w]; born 26 March 1961) is a Danish film director and screenwriter.

== Life and career ==
Oplev was born in Oue, Denmark. His 1996 film Portland was entered into the 46th Berlin International Film Festival.

He directed The Girl with the Dragon Tattoo, the 2009 Swedish film based on Stieg Larsson's novel of the same title, and won critical acclaim internationally. The film broke box office records in Europe, grossing over 100 million US dollars. Oplev decided to not continue directing the second and third parts of the Millennium Trilogy due to time constraints.

In April 2011, Oplev was set to direct the war film The Last Photograph (2026). As announced on 30 November 2012, Oplev directed the pilot of a 13-episode mini-series based on the Stephen King novel Under the Dome for CBS.

He directed Dead Man Down, a 2013 film starring Colin Farrell, Noomi Rapace, Dominic Cooper, Terrence Howard and F. Murray Abraham.

He was at one point set to direct The Keep based again on the novel with the same name, and Good People based on the novel by Marcus Sakey.

In 2015, USA Network aired Mr. Robot, and Oplev directed the pilot episode, which went on to win two Emmy nominations.

== Filmography ==
=== Film ===
Year	Title	Director	Writer
1996	Portland	Yes	Yes
2001	Chop Chop	Yes	Yes
2006	We Shall Overcome	Yes	Yes
2008	Worlds Apart	Yes	Yes
2009	The Girl with the Dragon Tattoo	Yes	No
2013	Dead Man Down	Yes	No
2014	Speed Walking	Yes	No
2017	Flatliners	Yes	No
2019	Daniel	Yes	No
2022	Rose*	Yes	No

*Also credited as executive producer

=== Television ===
Year	Title	Director	Executive Producer	Notes
2013	Under the Dome	Yes	No	Episode "Pilot"; Also producer
2015	Mr. Robot	Yes	Yes	Episode "eps1.0_hellofriend.mov"
2016	Game of Silence	Yes	Yes	Episode "Pilot"
2017	Midnight, Texas	Yes	Yes	Episode "Pilot"
2018	FBI	Yes	Yes	Episode "Pilot"
2022	Vikings: Valhalla	Yes	Yes	Episode "The Greenlanders"
2023	The Turkish Detective	Yes	No	2 episodes
2024–2026	NCIS: Origins	Yes	Yes	6 episodes
