= Klovn =

- Genre: Sitcom, Dark Comedy
- Created by: Casper Christensen; Frank Hvam
- Directed by: Mikkel Nørgaard
- Starring: Frank Hvam; Casper Christensen; Mia Lyhne; Iben Hjejle
- Country of origin: Denmark
- Original language: Danish
- No. of seasons: 11
- No. of episodes: 102

Production
- Executive producers: Keld Reinicke; Palle Strøm
- Producer: Ib Tardini
- Running time: 25 minutes

Original release
- Network: TV 2 Zulu
- Release: 7 February 2005 – 6 September 2026

Related
- Curb Your Enthusiasm

Klovn ("Clown") is a Danish sitcom, which first aired on the Danish TV channel TV2 Zulu. It focuses on the life of the main character Frank (played by Frank Hvam) and Casper (played by Casper Christensen). The show builds its comedy around quiet everyday situations, social awkwardness, uncomfortable silences and general faux pas.

Klovn shares many concepts with the American sitcom Curb Your Enthusiasm by Larry David, notably the main concept of a semi-retired comedian encountering humorous and embarrassing situations, along with his wife, friends and celebrity acquaintances. The show is also held in a pseudo-realistic style where all lines are retroscripted, so a first-time viewer might be in doubt of whether or not the show is staged. Even the score is similar. Despite this, in its closing credits, the show is claimed to be an original idea by Casper Christensen and Frank Hvam.

The sitcom consists of 102 episodes spread over 11 seasons, each episode lasting 25–30 minutes. The eleventh season aired in 2026.

On 16 December 2010, Klown was released, a movie based on the series but with an original plotline, with a sequel Klown Forever released in 2015 and the final movie Klovn the Final released in 2020.

== Characters ==
- Frank – Frank Hvam. Frank is the main character of the show. Frank is a comedian by profession and has a bad tendency to get into trouble. He often ends up in absurd situations together with his best friend, Casper.
- Casper – Casper Christensen. Casper is Frank's best friend and also a comedian/actor. He is rather ruthless and extremely promiscuous, constantly cheating on his girlfriend Iben. Frank often has to clean up the mess Casper makes and constantly takes the blame for him.
- Mia – Mia Lyhne. Mia is Frank's girlfriend throughout the entire series. She runs a tea shop together with a friend and is often dragged into the mischief that Frank and Casper make.
- Iben – Iben Hjejle. Iben is Casper's on and off girlfriend and Mia's best friend. At times she seems oblivious to Casper's adultery, seemingly focusing more on her own acting career.
- Claire – Claire Ross-Brown. Claire is Frank and Casper's secretary. She is originally British which often causes language mistakes that annoys Casper.
- Carøe – Michael Carøe. Carøe is Frank and Casper's friend. Frank and Casper have a strange relationship with Carøe, often getting into trouble with him. In one episode it is revealed that Carøe has dealt drugs from Mia's tea shop, and Frank ultimately rats him out to the police.
- Pivert – Jacob Weble. An old friend of Frank Hvam. Pivert is not very popular with Frank's new group of friends, and especially Casper dislikes him. This is especially expressed in the episode “Godfather of drugs” where Pivert by peer pressure is forced to do heroin, causing him to black out.
- Lene – Lene Nystrøm.
- Fnug – Camilla Lehmann.
- Lars – Lars Hjortshøj.

== Episodes ==
=== Season 1 – Based on Real Events ===
1. "5-års dagen" (The 5-years anniversary)
2. "De nye danskere" (The new Danes)
3. "Hushovmesteren" (The Butler)
4. "Dalai Lama" (Dalai Lama)
5. "Godfather of Drugs" (Godfather of Drugs)
6. "Løft ikke hunden" (Don't lift the Dog)
7. "Fars sidste ønske" (Dad's last Wish)
8. "Str. 44" (Size 44)
9. "Årstiderne" (The Seasons)
10. "Farvel igen mor" (Goodbye again Mom)

=== Season 2 – It's About Sex ===
1. "Casa Tua" (Italian) (Casa Tua)
2. "Bye Bye Bodil" (Bye Bye Bodil)
3. "Don Ø affæren" (The Don Ø-Affair)
4. "Thors øje" (Thor's Eye)
5. "Kgl. hofnar" (Royal Jester)
6. "It's a Jungle Down There" (It's a Jungle Down There)
7. "Ambassadøren" (The Ambassador)
8. "Carøes barnedåb" (Carøe's Christening)
9. "Irma-pigen" (The Girl from Irma)
10. "Franks fede ferie" (Frank's Great Vacation)

=== Season 3 – On the Road to New Disasters ===
1. "Rosé-forbandelsen" (The Rosé-Curse)
2. "London Kashmir" (London Kashmir)
3. "Pepino & Pepito" (Pepino & Pepito)
4. "Nina kære Nina" (Nina, dear Nina)
5. "100 dage i Forum" (100 Days in Forum)
6. "Biggie Blackie" (Biggie Blackie)
7. "Længe leve demokratiet" (Long live Democracy)
8. "Bøssernes Kennedy" (The Gays' Kennedy)
9. "En revisor-smølfe-CD" (An Accountant-smurf-CD)
10. "God jul, Frank" (Merry Christmas, Frank)

=== Season 4 – Last Chance! ===
1. "Unge hjerter" (Young Hearts)
2. "Hjem til far" (Home to Dad)
3. "Sankt Hans" (Midsummer)
4. "Bornholm" (Bornholm)
5. "Aben Ditmark" (Ditmark the Monkey)
6. "Jarlens død" (“The Earl” ‘s Death)
7. "Piverts polterabend" (Squeaky's Bachelor Party)
8. "Hejsan Sverige" (Swedish) (Hello Sweden)
9. "Tango for tre" (Tango for three)
10. "Ups" (Oops)

=== Season 5 – A Heart of Gold ===
1. "Mamma Mia" (Italian) (My Goodness)
2. "Mere ost Christian Braad Thomsen?" (More Cheese Christian Braad Thomsen?)
3. "White House Potential" (White House Potential)
4. "Tak for svaneæg" (Thanks for Swan-Egg)
5. "Den japanske have" (The Japanese Garden)
6. "Troldmanden fra Frederiksberg" (The Wizard from Frederiksberg)
7. "Hør nu efter Frank!" (Please listen Frank!)
8. "Tillykke Frank" (Happy Birthday Frank)
9. "Drys fra muffedissen" (Sprinkle from the Wristlet)
10. "Surprise Mia!" (Surprise Mia!)

=== Season 6 – Asstrip ===
1. "Guffeliguf" (Yummidy-yum)
2. "Shut up" (Shut up)
3. "Sivsko og Ægget" (Rush Shoes and the Egg)
4. "Fru Af og Til" (Mrs. Occasionally)
5. "Monsieur Le Boss" (French) (Mr. the Boss)
6. "Bedragsholm Slot" (Deception-islet Manor House)
7. "Bisbebjerg Tricket" (The Bispebjerg Trick)
8. "Et knus for et krus" (A Mug for a Hug)
9. "Dilletanterne" (The Dilettants)
10. "Falsk lorte alarm" (False Shit Alarm)

=== Season 7 – Back to Everyday Life ===
1. "Det muslimske klaver" (The Muslim Piano)
2. "Baked Alaska" (Same in English)
3. "#Metoo" (Same in English)
4. "Slikræven" (The Candy Fox)
5. "Tipo Napoli" (Italian for "Like Naples)
6. "Kender du typen" (Do you know the Type)
7. "Dobbelt dip" (Double Dip)
8. "Hvil i fred Mia" (Rest in Peace Mia)
9. "Mia's måne" (Mia's Moon)
10. "B.S. Skalaen" (The B.S. Scale)

=== Season 8 – Our Best Year ===
1. "Spild af Pingus" (Waste of Pingus)
2. "Frank the prank" (Same in English)
3. "Min bedste ven" (My Best Friend)
4. "Balling vs Bahs" (Same in English)
5. "Det gamle testamente" (The Old Testament)
6. "Falsk Pykker-alarm" (Wrong Pykker-Alarm)
7. "Forstanderen" (The Superintendent)
8. "Dr. Strangelove" (Same in English)

=== Season 9 – Side Effects ===
1. "De røde bukser" (The red pants)
2. "Frederiksberg-flisen" (The Frederiksberg tile)
3. "Portræt af en Tennisklub" (Portrait of a Tennis Club)
4. "Alter-ego" (Same in English)
5. "Darwins kontor" (Darwin's office)
6. "Folkemødet" (The People's Festival)
7. "Mias fede ferie" (Mia's great holiday)
8. "Venstretricket" (The left-handed trick)

=== Season 10 – World War III ===
1. "Vågekoner" (lit. 'Watch Women')
2. "Frederikshvile" (Same in English)
3. "Nøgen og forladt" (Naked and Abandoned)
4. "En natpadde" (lit. 'A Night Amphibian')
5. "Åleruse-metoden" (The Åleruse Method)
6. "Det sårede dyr på savannen" (The Wounded Animal on the Savanna)
7. "Russerne kommer" (The Russians are Coming)
8. "Kransekagernes Willy Wonka" (The Willy Wonka of Kransekager)

=== Season 11 – Zero Sex ===
1. "Ohayo Majbritt" (Same in English)
2. "Picaldis omelet" (Picaldi's omelette)
3. "Grand Hotel 1995" (Same in English)
4. "Yellowstone" (Same in English)
5. "Pia Mia" (Same in English)
6. "Nissemor og hr. Pindsvin" (Nisse mom and Mr. Hedgehog)
7. "Klokkeren fra Frederiksberg" (Bell-ringer from Frederiksberg)
8. "Well done London" (Same in English)

== International broadcasts ==
Country	Local name	TV Network(s)
Iceland	Trúður	RÚV
Norway	Klovn	TV 2 Zebra
Sweden	Klovn	TV4 Komedi
Finland	Pinsamt (Swedish), Kyllä nolottaa (Finnish)	Yle Fem
United States	Klown	Hulu
Australia	Clown	SBS One

== International versions ==
Country	Local name	TV Network(s)
Netherlands	Jeuk	BNNVARA
Belgium	AUWCH_	VIER
Germany	jerks.	ProSieben
