= Princess (2006 film) =

Film by Anders Morgenthaler

- Danish DVD cover
- Directed by: Anders Morgenthaler
- Written by: Anders Morgenthaler; Mette Heeno
- Produced by: Sarita Christensen
- Starring: Thure Lindhardt; Stine Fischer Christensen; Ida Dwinger
- Cinematography: Kasper Andersen
- Edited by: Mikkel E.G. Nielsen
- Music by: Mads Brauer; Casper Clausen
- Distributed by: Det Danske Filminstitut; Nordisk Film; Tartan Films
- Release date: 16 June 2006
- Running time: 82 minutes
- Countries: Denmark; Germany
- Language: Danish
- Budget: DKK 8.6 million

Princess is a 2006 adult animated drama film directed by Anders Morgenthaler and co-written by Morgenthaler and Mette Heeno. The film tells the harsh story of a missionary named August (Thure Lindhardt) whose sister, a former porn star nicknamed "The Princess," has died of drug abuse and left behind her 5-year-old daughter. August adopts the child and they embark on a violent mission of vengeance to destroy all existing pornographic material featuring Princess.

Princess, rated for mature audiences, won awards at three European film festivals and was nominated for the 2007 Robert Award for Best Danish Film.

== Cast ==
- Thure Lindhardt as August (voice)
- Stine Fischer Christensen as Christina (voice)
- Jens Arentzen
- Rasmus Bjerg
- Jiming Cai
- Liv Corfixen as Hooker in car (voice)
- Ida Dwinger as Mother (voice)
- Mira Hilli Møller Hallund as Mia (voice)
- Rikke Hallund
- Henrik Ibsen
- Tommy Kenter as Preben (voice)
- Margrethe Koytu as Karen (voice)
- Søren Lenander as Sonny (voice)
- Karen Rosenberg as Woman (voice)
- Christian Tafdrup as Charlie
- Peter van Hoof as Various Characters (voice)
- Niels Weyde as Officer Andersen (voice)
- Gunnar Wille
