= Deliver Us from Evil (2009 film) =

- Directed by: Ole Bornedal
- Written by: Ole Bornedal
- Starring: Lasse Rimmer; Lene Nystrøm
- Cinematography: Dan Laustsen
- Distributed by: SF Film
- Release date: 3 April 2009
- Running time: 100 minutes
- Country: Denmark
- Language: Danish

Deliver Us from Evil (Danish: Fri os fra det onde) is a 2009 Danish thriller film directed by Ole Bornedal.

== Cast ==
- Lasse Rimmer – Johannes
- Lene Nystrøm – Pernille
- Fanny Bornedal – Viola
- Jacob Ottensten – Frederik
- Mogens Pedersen - Ingvar
- Lone Lindorff – Anna
- Sonja Richter – presenter

== Reception ==
On review aggregator website Rotten Tomatoes, the film holds an approval rating of 80% based on 5 reviews, with an average rating of 7.0/10.
