= Jonas Schmidt =

Danish self-taught actor and comedian (born 1973)

- Born: June 20, 1973 (age 51)
- Citizenship: Denmark
- Occupation(s): Actor, comedian

Jonas Tveje Bisgaard Schmidt is a Danish self-taught actor and comedian, best known for portraying Dolph the Fascist Hippo.

== Career ==
Jonas Schmidt has appeared in numerous roles, mostly comedy however. He first gained fame, portraying the nerdy carseller Bruce, in the Danish Toyota commercials.

He later gained fame as the extremely nerdy police officer John Schmidt (a play on his real name) on the comedy television series P.I.S.. A character that suffered of many things, including low self-esteem, being ultra geeky and having difficulties with women. A role Jonas Schmidt later has portrayed many times, in different ways.

As Dolph, the insane fascist hippo on Wulffmorgenthaler, Jonas Schmidt became a national celebrity. In 2005, Dolph was one of the most popular figures with the youth in Denmark. Dolph looked cute, like a moomin, but he used swear words, killed people, and was extremely racist and hateful. The character was designed, to make fun of people with racist opinions.

Jonas Schmidt also played the role of Allan Falk Nielsen on the Danish advent series "Jul i Verdensrummet". A role similar to the one he played on "P.I.S. - Politiets Indsats Styrke".

In 2007, he appeared at Dansk Melodi Grand Prix as the annoying security guard Brian, who was hired to make sure none of the participants would get into the building without his permission.

== Personal life ==
He is engaged to Unni Ryding, and they have two kids.
