= Dolph the Fascist Hippo =

Fictional character

Dolph

Publication information
- First appearance: 2003
- Created by: Mikael Wulff; Anders Morgenthaler

In-story information
- Species: Hippopotamus

Mikael Wulff and Dolph in a promotional video for the 2019 film Monty and the Street Party

Dolph also known as Dolph the Fascist Hippo is a fictional character appearing in the Danish television show Dolph og Wulff med venner (Dolph and Wulff with friends), played by Danish actor Jonas Schmidt, who is otherwise known in Denmark from another popular comedy series, P.I.S., and a long-running series of Toyota commercials.

Dolph is a large, fascist, baby-blue hippopotamus usually appearing armed with a baseball bat. He first appeared as a minor character in the Danish cartoon strip Wulffmorgenthaler.
