= Jacob Tingleff =

Jacob Tingleff (born 21 June 1972) is a Danish stand-up comedian and scriptwriter. He is known for the one-man shows "Ulige Uger" (2014/15), "Guide Til Parforhold" (2011), "Tingleff, Tingleff eller Tingleff" (2008), "Pyt Med Skjorten" (2006), and the ensemble-shows "Den Ægte Vare" (2002) and "Farvelagte Frustrationer" (2004).

All of Tingleff's shows have been broadcast and released on DVD. In 2010, his first children's book (Englejagten) was published by Høst & Søn. He has written numerous scripts for television, several theater plays, and is currently working as a screenwriter alongside his ongoing comedy career.
