= Jan Gintberg =

Danish stand-up comedian

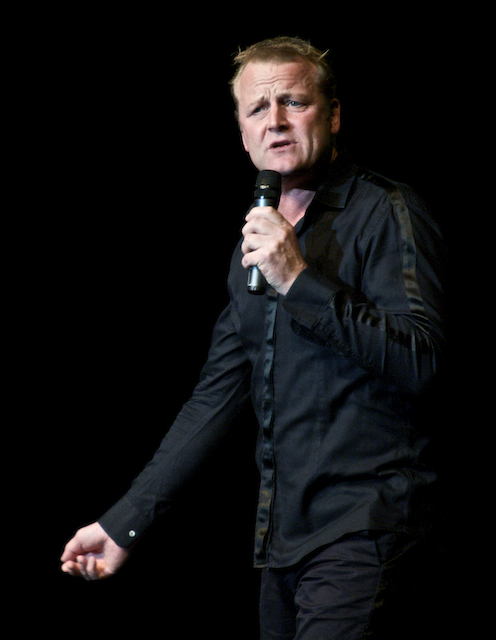
- Photo: Simon Wedege
- Born: 3 December 1963 (age 62); Lynge, Allerød Municipality, Denmark

Jan Michael Gintberg (born 3 December 1963) is a Danish stand-up comedian and television and radio host.

== Education ==
Gintberg originally planned a farming career, and has a farming diploma from Kalø Landbrugsskole in Jutland. He subsequently started on the agronomy programme at the Royal Veterinary and Agricultural University (later merged into the University of Copenhagen). He has a bachelor's degree in agronomy.

== Career ==
He started his career as a stand-up comedian in 1992 where he was number three in the competition to be the best Danish stand-up comedian. In 1997 he got his breakthrough with the radio-program Tæskeholdet (Danish for: The Thrashing Team) on DR's P3, along with Casper Christensen, Mads Vangsø, and Søren Søndergaard. Since then he has been a part of many television comedy shows, either as a writer or host, and has toured Denmark with a number of stand-up shows, among them a double show with Jonathan Spang. In early 2006 he appeared on The Daily Show on Comedy Central during the Muhammed drawings crisis. He is currently the host of the Danish version of the game show Are You Smarter Than a 5th Grader?. Has now a count of 5 oneman stand-up shows, from 1998 to 2007: 'Det ligger i generne' (It's in the genes)(1998), 'Gearet 2 tænder' (Geared 2 tacks)(2000), 'Op på fars jihad' (Onto dad's jihad)(2002), 'Den grimme melding' (The ugly announcement)(2004) and 'Big Time Paranoia' (2007). Gintberg is especially known for talking about politicians, political subjects and other current events in his shows. Mostly it's the Danish Government that's in his focus. On 1 November 2006 Gintberg published is first ever book, Dysfunktionel Far, about his life as a father, seen from Gintberg's characteristic, and humorous, point of view. Gintberg Verden (Gintberg's World), a book collecting Gintberg's best columns from a variety of newspapers, was published in the fall of 2007. He also gave voice to Mushu in the movie Mulan.

== Personal life ==
Gintberg is the youngest of four siblings, with two sisters and one brother. Despite a lot of joking about marriage, Gintberg married his longtime girlfriend Nina Sepstrup. They have two children, Eline (b. 1997), and August (b. 2004). Eline was born with Down syndrome. They currently live in Søborg, in Northern Zealand of Denmark.

Although Gintberg is known to be a rather political-centered comedian, he has not revealed his own political views or party.
