= Lars Hjortshøj =

Danish stand-up comedian and television and radio host

Lars Hjortshøj (born 3 June 1967 in Hinnerup) is a Danish stand-up comedian and television and radio host.

He has taken part in many Danish shows, including Casper & Mandrilaftalen and in the sit-com Langt fra Las Vegas.

As of February 2006 Lars Hjortshøj is still co-host in Radio 100FM's morning show Morgenhyrderne along with Lasse Rimmer and Andrea Elisabeth Rudolph.

He appeared in a recurring role as a fictionalized version of himself in the Danish sit-com Klovn, playing one of the main characters Frank Hvam's colleagues, a stand-up comedian.

He is (as of 2008) the host of the US-adopted game show Sandhedens Time, in the US, it is called The Moment of Truth.

Lars and his wife live outside of Copenhagen with their two children.
