= Iben Hjejle =

Danish actress

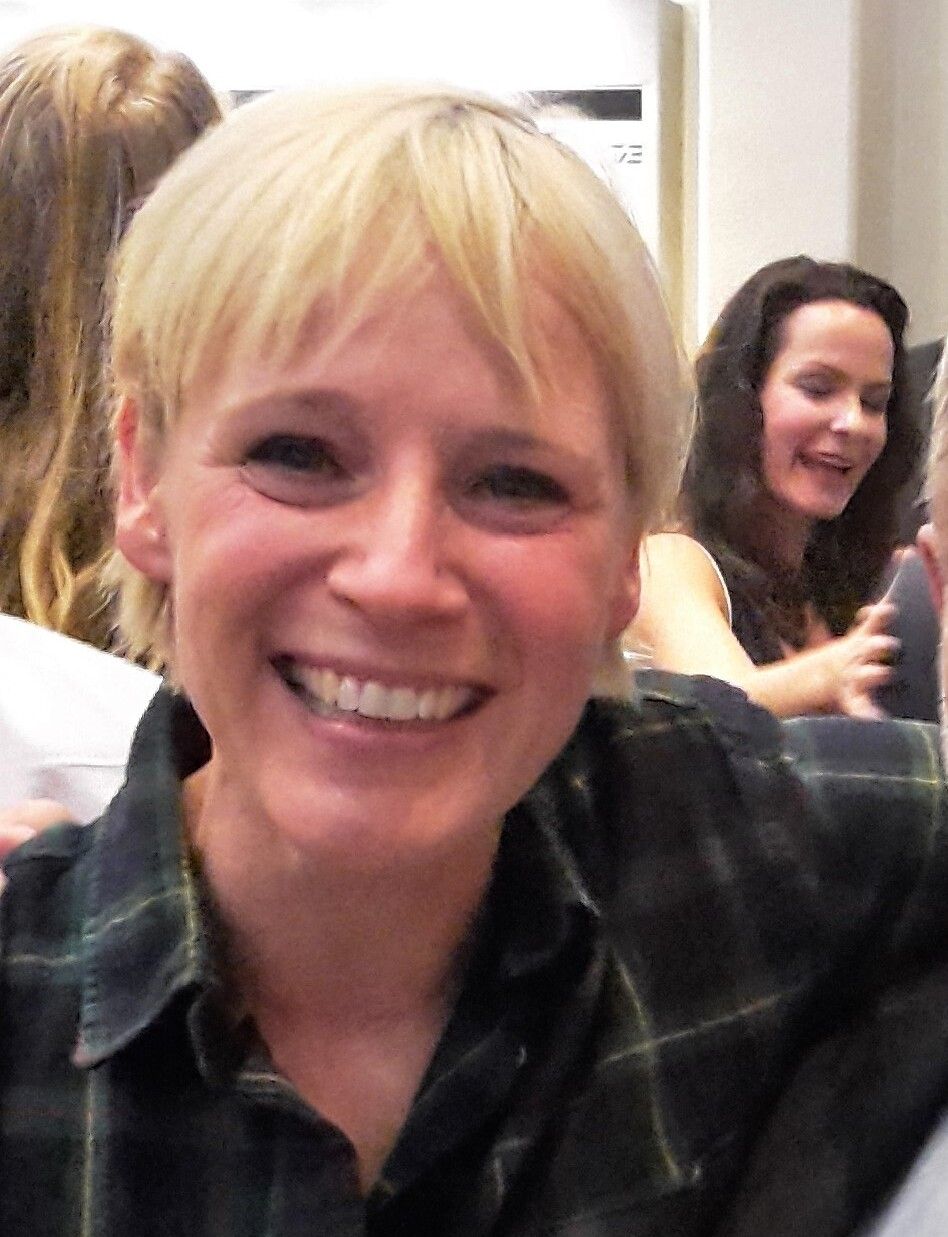
- Iben Hjejle in 2016
- Born: 22 March 1971 (age 55); Copenhagen, Denmark
- Occupation: Actress
- Years active: 1992–2017 (on hiatus)
- Spouse: Emil de Waal (m. 1996; div. 1999)
- Children: 1

Iben Hjejle (Danish: [ˈiˀpm̩ ˈjɑjlə]; born 22 March 1971) is a Danish actress, notable for starring in the Stephen Frears film High Fidelity (2000). In Denmark, she is perhaps best known for appearing in the Danish television sitcom Langt fra Las Vegas (Far from Las Vegas) and for playing the girlfriend of Danish comedian Casper Christensen, her former real life partner. She also plays Christensen's girlfriend in the sitcom Klovn (Clown) and the title role in the TV crime series Dicte.

== Career ==
Iben Hjejle has starred in a range of Danish movies, including a Dogme 95 film and Danish-produced action films such as Old Men in New Cars. She played the Swedish Queen Sofia Magdalena in SVT's successful period drama production of The Marriage of Gustav III (2001).

Hjejle also appeared in such films as Portland (1996), Mifune's Last Song (1999), The Emperor's New Clothes (2002), and in Dreaming of Julia and Flickering Lights, both in 2003.

For her performance in Mifune's Last Song, she won an Honourable Mention at the 49th Berlin International Film Festival. She was discovered by British director Stephen Frears at this same festival.

He offered her a part in his film High Fidelity (2000), in which she played Laura, girlfriend of John Cusack's character. In 2008, Frears offered her a part in Chéri, in a cameo as Marie Laure. This was part of a kind of international comeback for her. That same year, she also worked on Defiance with Daniel Craig. In 2009, she filmed The Eclipse, which received a limited theatrical release in 2010.

Hjejle was for three seasons a part of the Danish popular television series Anna Pihl until it ended in April 2008. In 2012, she was cast as the lead in the crime show Dicte. The show debuted in early 2013, and while its reviews were mixed, Hjejle received good reviews for her performance.

She had a part in Lars von Trier's Direktøren for det hele (2006, also known as The Boss of It All).

In June 2024, Hjejle received a Reumert Award for the Lead Actor of the Year for her performance in Lægen (The Doctor) at Folketeatret.

== Personal life ==
Hjejle was born in Copenhagen. From 1996 to 1999, she was married to Emil de Waal.

== Filmography ==
Filmography
Year	Title	Role	Notes
1996	Portland	Eva	
1999	Mifune's Last Song	Liva Psilander	Berlin International Film Festival – Honorable Mention; Nominatated – Bodil Awards Best Actress; Nominated – European Film Awards Best Actress; The movie received limited theatrical release in the US
2000	High Fidelity	Laura	Nominated – Chicago Film Critics Association Awards Most promising actress
2000	Flickering Lights	Therese	
2001	The Emperor's New Clothes	Nicole 'Pumpkin' Truchaut	
2001	Gustav III:s äktenskap (aka The Marriage of Gustav III)	Queen Sofia Magdalena	TV series
2002–2003	Langt fra Las Vegas	Liva	TV-series. Main character seasons 2–5
2002	Old Men in New Cars	Mille	
2003	Skagerrak	Marie	Reunited with Søren Kragh-Jacobsen, who directed her in Mifune
2003	Dreaming of Julia (aka Cuban Blood/Cuba Libre) (2003)	Julia	
2004	Monsterthursday	Sara	
2005	Klovn	Iben	(TV-series) (2005–2009, 2026)
2006	Direktøren for det Hele (aka The Boss of It All)	Lise	The first of her movies to be released theatrically in the US since The Emperor's New Clothes
2006	Anna Pihl	Mikala Hansen	(TV-series) (2006–2008)
2008	Boy Meets Girl	Kathrine Poulsen	
2008	Defiance	Bella	To date the only movie she has starred in, that has been nominated for an Academy Award.
2008	Journey to Saturn	Susanne Mortensen, technical flight director	Voice role
2009	Chéri	Marie Laurie	Second collaboration with Stephen Frears
2009	The Eclipse	Lena Morrell	
2010	Wallander	Kim Kristensen	The Ghost (Vålnaden) Season 2 Episode 10
2010	Klovn	Iben	Released theatrically in the US in 2012
2011	Rosa Morena	Christine	
2011	Stockholm East	Anna	
2011	Dag	Juanita	(TV series) (2011–2013)
2012	Fuck up	Malin	
2013	Dicte	Dicte	(TV series) (2013–2016)
2013	Eskil & trinidad	Mette	
2013	Alle barn er laget av ild		
2016	Zootopia	Dawn Bellwether	Danish version
