= Mikael Wulff =

Danish comedian (born 1972)

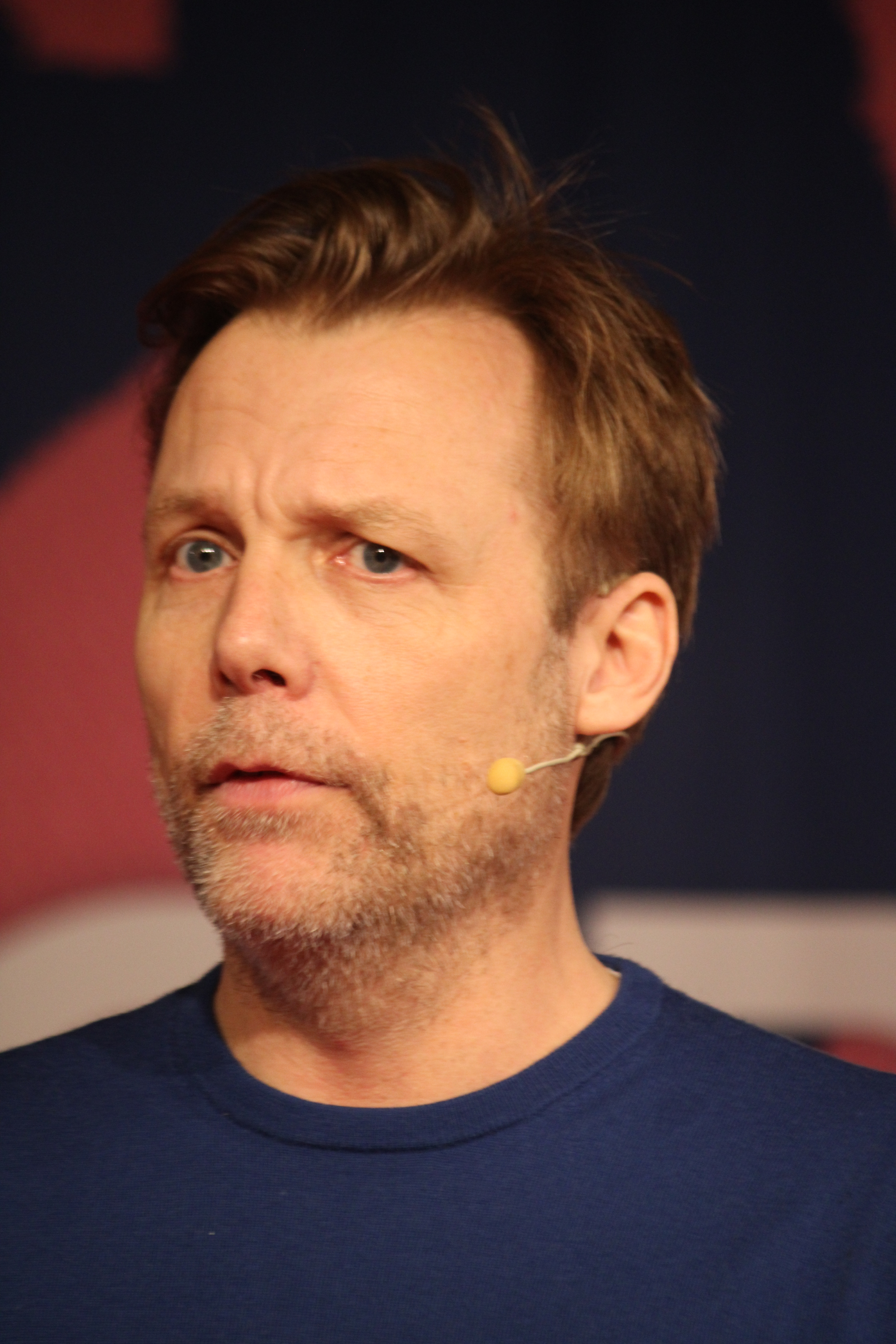
Wulff in 2025

Wulff and Dolph the Fascist Hippo in a promotional video for the 2019 film Monty and the Street Party

Mikael Wulff (born 2 September 1972) is a Danish comedian, who appeared in television shows such as Dolph og Wulff, and is co-illustrator of the Wulffmorgenthaler comic strips, which he produces together with Anders Morgenthaler. This comic also spawned the political-satirical comic Dolph the Fascist Hippo.
