= Wumo =

Comic strip

WUMO
- Author(s): Mikael Wulff; Anders Morgenthaler
- Website: wumo.com
- Current status/schedule: Daily
- Launch date: 2001
- Syndicate(s): Andrews McMeel Syndication
- Genre: satire

WUMO, formerly Wulffmorgenthaler, is a webcomic and newspaper comic strip created by Danish writer/artist duo Mikael Wulff and Anders Morgenthaler. The name of the strip is a portmanteau created from the pair's surnames. The name was also given to a comedy TV series, broadcast on the Danish channel DR2 in 2005. The strip changed its name to WUMO in June 2012.

== Publication history ==
WUMO debuted in 2001 as part of a comic strip competition entry named Kalzone, completed a few hours before the entry deadline. Submitted under the pseudonym "Pernille Richter Andersson", the strip won the competition, and a one-month run in the Danish national newspaper Politiken followed.

The strip became a regular feature on DR's internet culture portal in 2002, and in October 2003 it became a regular daily newspaper strip in Politiken.

As of June 2012, WUMO is printed daily in Politiken (Denmark), Aftonbladet (Sweden), Dagbladet (Norway), Die Welt (Germany), Helsingin Sanomat (Finland), and online-only in De Telegraaf (Netherlands) – and on its own website, wumo.com.

In October 2013, WUMO began being syndicated by Universal Uclick, appearing in hundreds of newspapers across the United States, including The Washington Post and the New York Daily News (in some markets replacing the comic strip Get Fuzzy). WUMO's launch was larger than those of such notable strips as Calvin and Hobbes and The Far Side.

== Style and content ==
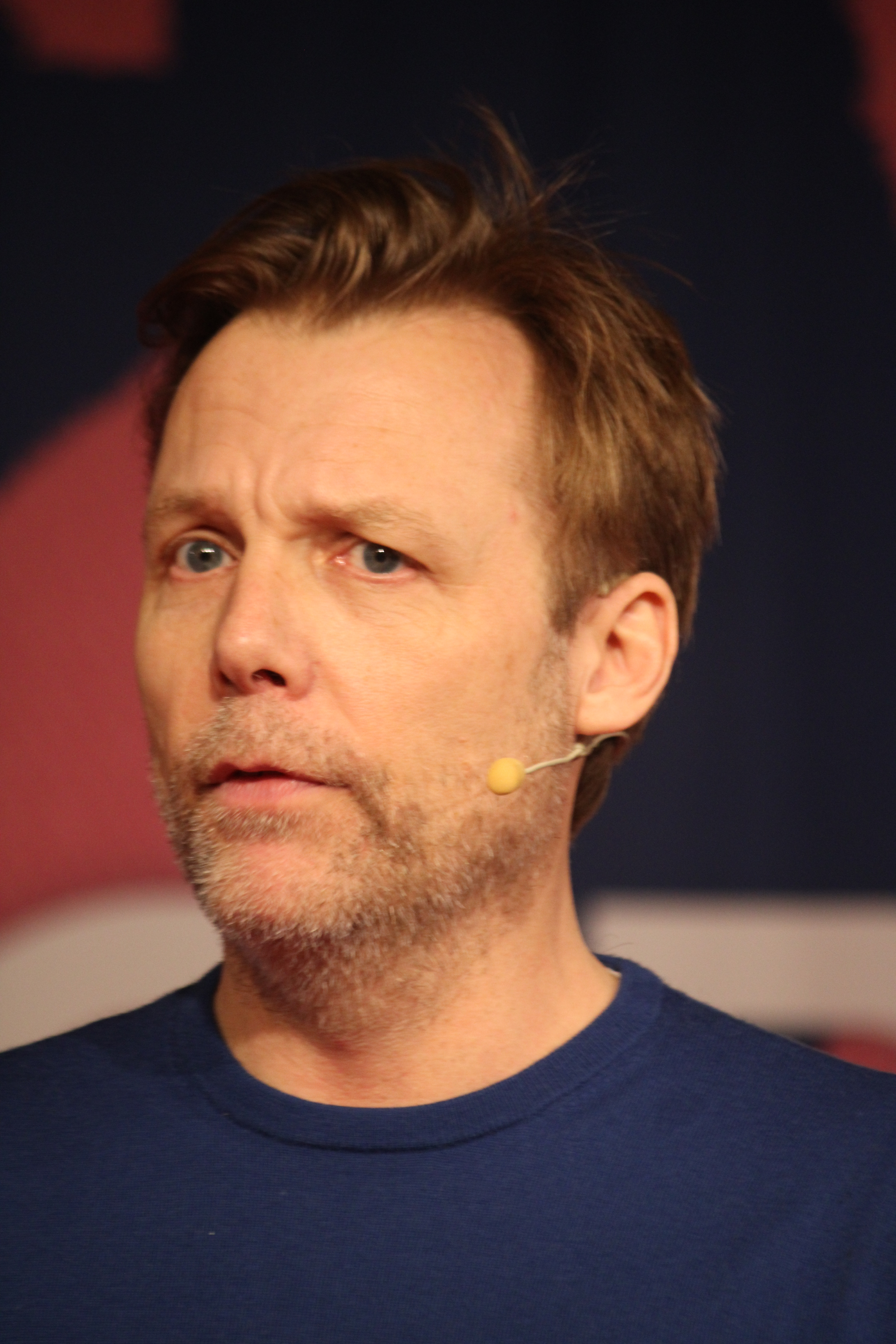
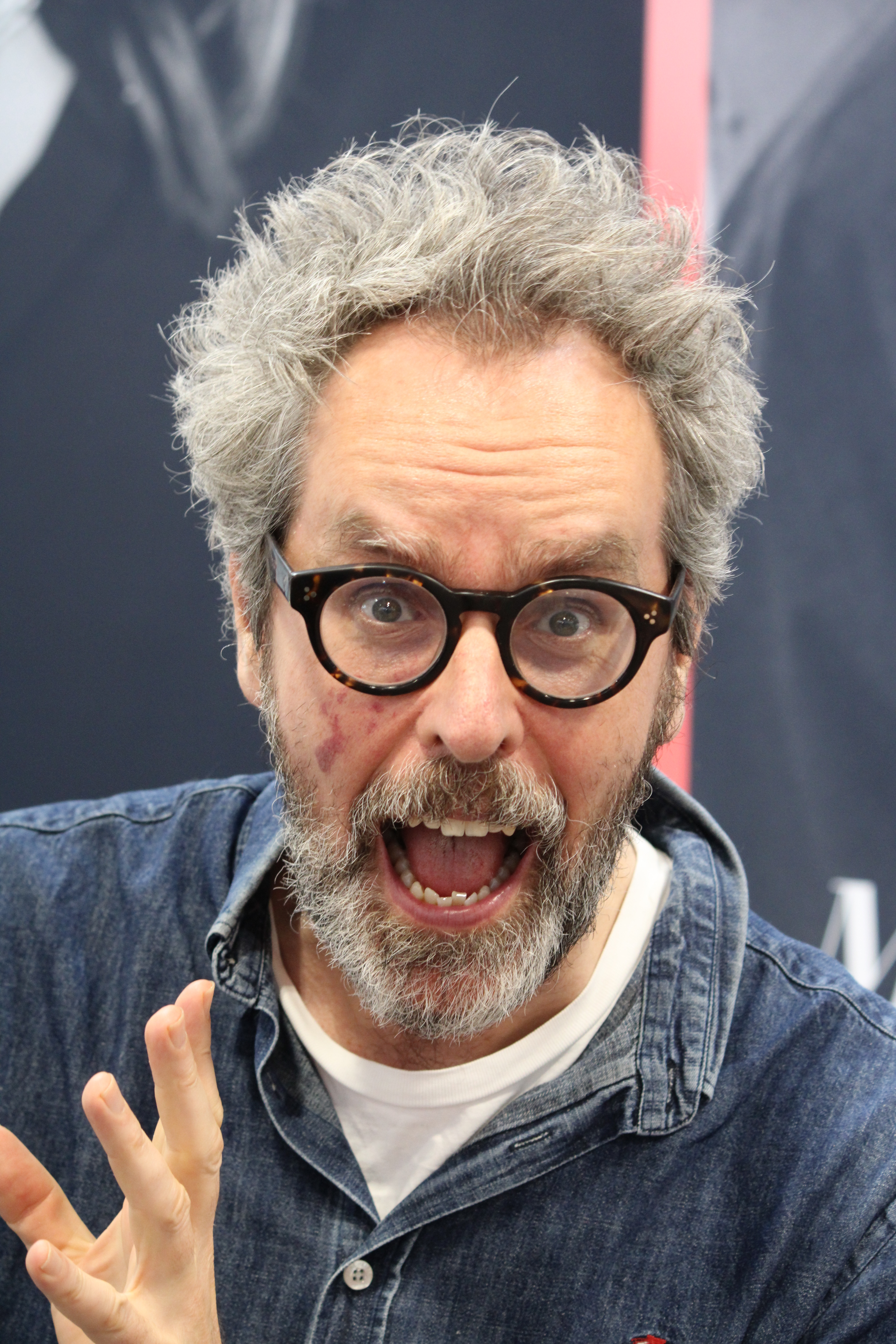

The comic has a very distinct style, featuring shaky line drawings and coloring that appears to be computer-generated. Most installments are delivered in a single panel, avoiding the more traditional format of boxed divisions to signify progress or movement in time. Recurring characters in WUMO tend to be more of a running gag than a legitimate continuing narrative.

For a period, humans portrayed in the comic wore no clothes. According to the comic's website, Morgenthaler "was fed up with the tiresome meticulousness of drawing clothes on people so he just stopped doing it." Sometimes, when the situation called for a specific outfit to denote a specific role, humans would appear clothed. Lately characters have all started to appear fully clothed, and older comics have been edited to add clothes.

Content ranges from sideways social satire to complete non-sequitur, and relies on both intelligent humor and simple slapstick. Reading WUMO is often an exercise of the imagination, as it has a habit of juxtaposing supremely ordinary characters in supremely unusual situations, or vice versa. "Punchlines" are delivered by way of dialogue or with one-liners written in a caption below the image. Because the comic is drawn in a non-serial format, delivery and timing are especially important (and difficult to maneuver), and as a result most of the humor in WUMO relies on the quality of the writing itself rather than the element of surprise that usually lends itself to the traditional comic-strip punchline.

== Plagiarism accusations ==
The strip was for a period the focus of a debate concerning plagiarism, as the strip's followers voiced their concern over an advertising campaign by the Danish office of advertising agency DDB promoting the Volkswagen Golf GT, having appropriated its joke from a Wulffmorgenthaler strip. In a reversed issue, Wulffmorgenthaler was accused of plagiarising a photograph that had circulated on internet, to which Anders Morgenthaler conceded that the duo had been inspired by the image and based a strip on it in the belief that it was a privately forwarded photograph.

== In other media ==
=== Television series ===
WUMO was also broadcast as a television series, in the style of a parodied show for children in Denmark, in which Wulff, Morgenthaler and their puppet friends Dolph, a fascist hippo and Margit, a politically correct female squirrel, introduce various short films. The only recurring character from the comic is the Toucan Kid. New characters include Ansgar and Loke, a very sexually active archeologist and his colleague who is deadly afraid of "the Vagina", the contestants on a fifties game show. Another recurring feature on the show was a "Reality show" starring a hapless school photographer, Bent, and his retarded assistant Bubber, the brothers Lefevre, who are carpet salesmen trying to be actors, Asger Lesniak who has a personal vendetta against a guy who frequents the places he works, and Bimmer, a character obsessed with life in the tropic nether regions.

The TV series evolved in the second season into Dolph og Wulff, in a documentary style, with The Fascist Hippo Dolph as the dominating main character.

The second season further evolved to a third season, this time in the style of a late-night talk show, on 17 March called Dolph og Wulff – med venner (Dolph and Wulff – with friends). The friends are a sex-crazed, English-speaking beaver named Rocco and an orangutan called "Finn". Rocco was actually created as a sex-crazed squirrel for the first season, but it was ultimately decided to not use him, so the Rocco puppet was used as Margit instead.

In 2011, Wulff & Morgenthaler created a TV show – the animated sitcom 'The Pandas' (Pandaerne), which ran for three seasons. A Canadian-American remake of The Pandas was announced to be in production from Corus Entertainment and Bento Box Entertainment. The series was planned to air in 2016, but has since been scrapped due to Fox Entertainment's acquisition of Bento Box Entertainment in 2019.
