= Frank Hvam =

Danish comedian

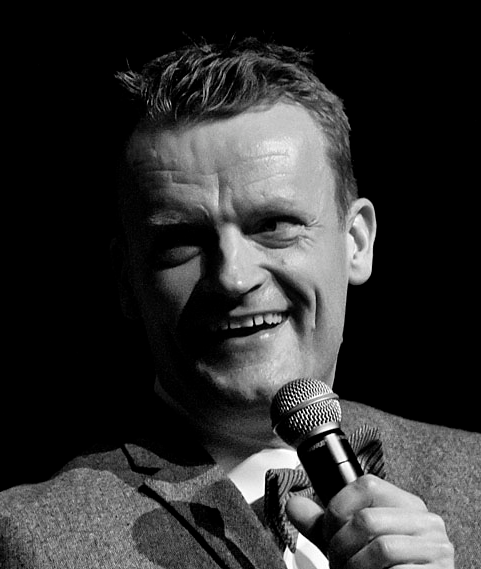
- Hvam in 2013
- Born: Frank Hvam Nielsen; 12 September 1970 (age 55); Viborg, Denmark
- Spouse: Anja Farsig

Frank Hvam Nielsen, known professionally as Frank Hvam (born 12 September 1970) is a Danish stand-up comedian.

Hvam was born in Viborg and grew up on a farm in Ørum Sønderlyng. His legal name is Nielsen, but he uses only his middle name professionally. After studying veterinary medicine for 3 and a half years, he dropped out to try his luck as a comedian.

He is known for his performance as the "geek" Kenny Nickelman in the Danish sitcom Langt fra Las Vegas and as a writer and performer in the Pythonesque comedy Casper og Mandrilaftalen. His collaboration with Casper Christensen on Casper og Mandrilaftalen was the beginning of a writing partnership that has yielded several comedy productions, including a Danish version of the British Shooting Stars and seven seasons of Klovn.

In 2016, he joined the cast of the HBO series Game of Thrones in "The Winds of Winter", the finale of Season 6, as a Citadel maester.

== Filmography ==
=== Film ===
- Tid til forandring (2004)
- Rejsen til Saturn (2008)
- Æblet & ormen (2009)
- Klovn - The Movie (2010)
- Talenttyven (2012)
- Klovn Forever (2015)

=== Television ===
- Casper & Mandrilaftalen (1999)
- Stig Römer Live (2001)
- Kissmeyer Basic (2001)
- Langt fra Las Vegas (2001–2003)
- Wulffs Magasin (2008)
- Skæg med tal (2008)
- Klovn (2005–2009, 2018, 2021–2022, 2025–2026)
- Live fra Bremen (guest host, 1 episode)
- Game of Thrones (2016, 1 episode)
