= Radio 100 (Denmark) =

Radio station in Denmark

Radio 100 (former "Radio 100FM") is a Danish radio channel. The name refers to the fact that the station used to broadcast on 100.0 MHz on the FM spectrum in the Greater Copenhagen Area.

On 18 June 2003 Bruun Rasmussens Kunstauktion held an auction for two free spaces in the FM spectrum. One of them was bought by Talpa Radio International and on 15 November 2003 Radio 100FM aired and covered 38% of Denmark.

In August 2005 Radio 100FM became the first commercial network to have a larger market share than the public station P3 owned by Danmarks Radio.
