= Casper Christensen =

Danish comedian (born 1968)

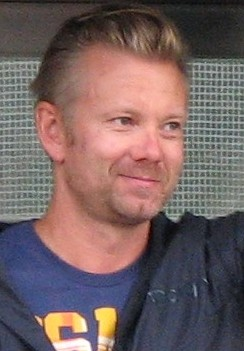
- Christensen in 2009
- Born: 22 August 1968 (age 57); Munkebo, Denmark

Casper Lindholm Christensen (born 22 August 1968) is a Danish comedian. He has hosted many shows including Casper & Mandrilaftalen, the Danish airing of Shooting Stars and Don't Forget Your Toothbrush (Husk lige tandbørsten), and the Danish version of Deal or No Deal. He also had a leading role in the Danish sit-coms Langt fra Las Vegas (Far from Las Vegas) and the long running series Klovn (Clown/Fool).

== Life and career ==
Christensen was born in Munkebo. He started his TV-career in the Danish children's show Hvaffor en Hånd? (Which Hand?) in 1991 but is also well known for hosting the very successful radio program Tæskeholdet (The Whack Pack).

One of Casper Christensen's characteristics early in his career was his appearance, often including big glasses, whacky hairstyle, and an abstract clothing style. Christensen is also well known for his energetic appearance on screen. In this period, Christensen's most notable appearances were Casper & Mandrilaftalen, Tæskeholdet and Safari. In later years, Christensen has toned down his crazy appearance, and made a career shift towards more serious projects. Casper Christensen has also become one of the most sought after Danish TV hosts; hosting more mainstream shows like Grib mikrofonen, Deal no Deal and 8 out of 10 Cats, Da; 9 ud af 10.

On 1 February 2007, Casper returned to radio with the programme Kongen af Danmark (The King of Denmark) on the Danish radio station TV 2 Radio. Casper Christensen quickly left TV2 Radio and instead began writing on the 5th and 6th season of Klovn with his long-time colleague Frank Hvam. The 6th season aired on TV2 Zulu in the spring of 2009. On 2 October 2009, he aired his latest project for the first time on TV 2. It is a live talk show called ALOHA!.

He is a born again Christian having converted when he was 52 and is a member of the Hillsong Church.

== Television work ==
TV	Broadcaster	Year	Credit
Hvaffor en hånd	DR1	(1991-1995)	Host
Transit	DR1	(1992)	Host
A.T.O.M. TV	TV3	(1994)	Host
Husk Lige Tandbørsten	DR1	(1996)	Host, writer
Safari	DR1	(11 episodes, 1996)	Host, writer
Dansk Grammy 1997		(1997)	Host
Stand-up.dk	TV2 Zulu	(1 episode, 1997)	
Casper og Jan på Sankt Hans	TV2	(1998)	
Darios Joint	TV2	(5 episodes, 1998)	Host, writer
80 års fødselsdagen	DR2	(2000)	Actor
Danish Deejay Awards 2001	TV2	(2001)	Host
Casper og drengene fra Brasilien	DVD	(2002)	Host, writer
Hvor svært kan det være		1 episode	Actor
Zulu Awards	TV2 Zulu	(2002, 2003)	Host
Shooting Stars	TV2 Zulu	(2004)	Host
Træmand	TV2 Zulu	(2004)	Host
Zulu Royal	TV2 Zulu	(2003, 2004, 2006)	Host, writer
Grib Mikrofonen	TV2	(2006)	Host
Ni ud af ti	TV2	(2006)	Host
Deal No Deal	TV2	(2006)	Host
Casper & Mandrilaftalen	DR2	(67 episodes, 1999)	Actor, writer
Langt fra Las Vegas	TV2 Zulu, TV2	(2001-2003)	Actor, writer
Deroute	DR2	(1 episode, 2008)	Actor
Klovn	TV2 Zulu, TV2	(95 episodes, 2005–2009, 2018, 2021–2022, 2025–2026)	Actor, writer
Aloha!	TV2	(18 episodes, 2009–2010)	Host
Live fra Bremen	TV2	(18 episodes, 2009-2013 )	Actor, writer

== Filmography ==
Feature Films	Director	Year	Credit
Hannibal & Jerry	Wilke & Rasmussen	1997	Actor
Collector	Lasse Spang Olsen	2004	Actor
The Boss of It All	Lars von Trier	2006	Actor
Journey to Saturn		2008	Voice
Klovn	Mikkel Nørgaard	2010	Actor, writer
I Sandhedens Tjeneste	TBA	2011	Writer
Klown Forever	Mikkel Nørgaard	2015	Actor, writer
Undercover	Nikolaj Peyk	2016	Writer
Dan-Dream	Jesper Rofelt	2017	Actor, writer
The Hustle	Chris Addison	2019	Actor
Klovn the Final	Mikkel Nørgaard	2020	Actor, writer

== Radio ==
Show	Broadcaster	Year	Credit
Tæskeholdet	DR, P3	(1997)	Host, writer
Kongen af Danmark	TV2 Radio	(2007)	Host, writer
