= Arnaud Binard =

French actor and producer

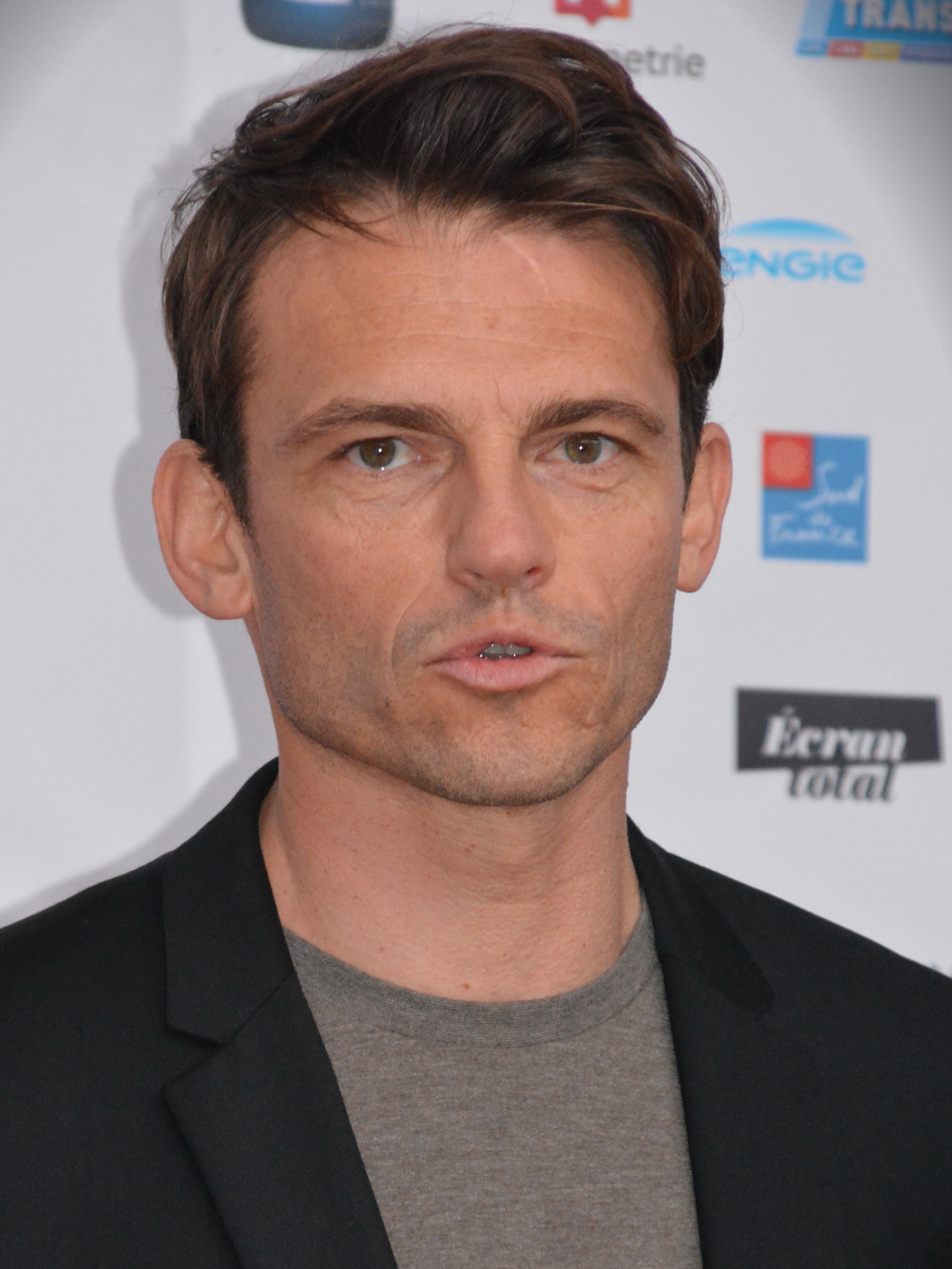
- Born: 18 January 1971 (age 55); Bordeaux, France
- Occupations: Actor; Producer
- Years active: 1995–present
- Children: Julianne Binard; Maya-Rose Binard

Arnaud Binard (born 18 January 1971 in Bordeaux) is a French actor and producer mainly known for his roles in many romantic or detective television hit-series broadcast throughout the French-speaking world such as Sous Le Soleil (1998–1999), France 2's Groupe Flag (2002–2004), TF1's Alice Nevers: The judge is a woman (2002–2007), France 2's Empreintes criminelles (2011), Chérif (2015-2017) or France 3's Agathe Koltès (2016–2019). His feature films include Gabriel Axel's Leïla (2001) or the erotic dramas Grande École (2004) based on Jean-Marie Besset's The Best of Schools or Jean-Claude Brisseau's À l'aventure (2009). Within the English-speaking world, Binnard appeared in Hulu's Guidestones, ABC's Modern Family and plays Laurent in Emily in Paris.

== Early life ==
Binard grew up in the seaside resort of Seignosse-le-Penon where his parents, sports teachers, managed the old public seawater pools. Passionate about surfing, he declared:

“As a teenager, the waves were an obsession. I dreamt of it every night. I saw surfers in my village as living gods. My parents had taught me very early on how to swim into the waves, but my father refused to see me practicing this 'smoky backpacker sport'. He eventually gave in, but we had already moved to Lot-et-Garonne, far from the coast. The frustration was intense." Sud-Ouest, July 2017.

== Education ==
At Marmande High School, Binard volunteered to form a theater group responding to the literature teacher's request to try to "conjure [his] great shyness". He started in the theater at the age of fourteen and for several years explored different facets of acting: "the pleasure of acting never left me." He continued his theatrical journey in Bordeaux, where he also began studying to become a physical education teacher. From the classical repertoire to street theater via improvisation, he extended his career by moving to Paris in 1996 to take the Jean Darnel course at the Théâtre de l'Atelier.

== Career ==
He has been working for several years in television (Le Dernier Seigneur des Balkans, Alice Nevers, Le Ciel sur la tête, Empreintes criminelles...) and cinema (À l'aventure, ID:A).

In 2014, he portrayed the character of Brooklyn Cott on series Guidestones (season 2).

In Novembre 2014, he founded broadcasting production company Atelier K-plan which is based in Bordeaux.

Since 2016, he plays the role of Captain Fontaine on TV Series Agathe Koltès (France 3).

== Filmography ==
| Year | Title | Role | Director | Note |
|---|---|---|---|---|
| 1995 | Le miracle de l'amour | Greg | Gérard Espinasse, Dominique Giuliani, ... | TV series (5 episodes) |
| 1998 | Les kidnappeurs | Rufus | Graham Guit | |
| 1998 | Sous le soleil | Manu | Eric Summer, Philippe Roussel, ... | TV series (18 episodes) |
| 1999 | Superlove | Stéphane | Jean-Claude Janer | |
| 1999–2005 | Manatea, les perles du Pacifique | Antoine Coste | Hervé Renoh, Hugues de Laugardière, ... | TV series (13 episodes) |
| 2001 | Leïla | Nils | Gabriel Axel | |
| 2002 | Mortes de préférence | Dr. Antoine Moser | Jean-Luc Breitenstein | TV movie |
| 2002 | Duelles | Thomas Verdi | Laurence Katrian | TV series (1 episode) |
| 2002–2004 | Groupe flag | Rémi | Eric Summer & Étienne Dhaene | TV series (7 episodes) |
| 2002–2007 | Le juge est une femme | Romance / Denis Wuygans | Stéphane Kappes, Charlotte Brändström, ... | TV series (15 episodes) |
| 2003 | Bloody Pizza | The director | Michel Rodas | Short |
| 2003 | Les femmes ont toujours raison | Max | Élisabeth Rappeneau | TV movie |
| 2003 | Valentine | Grégoire | Eric Summer | TV movie |
| 2004 | Grande École | Waterpolo coach | Robert Salis | |
| 2004 | Lune rousse | Cayatte | Laurent Dussaux | TV movie |
| 2005 | Le dernier seigneur des Balkans | Zulfikar Bey | Michel Favart | TV mini-series |
| 2006 | Times Have Been Better (Le ciel sur la tête) | Jérémy | Régis Musset | TV movie |
| 2007 | Fort comme un homme | Franck | Stéphane Giusti | TV movie |
| 2007 | Lost Signs | Xavier Mayer | Didier Albert | TV mini-series |
| 2008 | À l'aventure | Greg | Jean-Claude Brisseau | |
| 2009 | Josephine, Guardian Angel | Hadrien | Jean-Marc Seban | TV series (1 episode) |
| 2010 | Les toqués | Simon | Laurence Katrian | TV series (1 episode) |
| 2010 | Maison Close | Francis Arnoult | Mabrouk El Mechri, Jacques Ouaniche, ... | TV series (6 episodes) |
| 2010-2011 | Empreintes criminelles | Pierre Cassini | Christian Bonnet | TV series (6 episodes) |
| 2011 | ID：A | Pierre | Christian E. Christiansen | Nominated - Ole Award for Best Supporting Actor |
| 2011-2012 | Clem | Bruno | Joyce Buñuel | TV series (4 episodes) |
| 2012 | Section de recherches | Nicolas Farrel | Gérard Marx & Éric Le Roux | TV series (1 episode) |
| 2012 | Nouvelle Maud | Captain Marc Soubeyrand | Régis Musset | TV series (5 episodes) |
| 2013 | Enquêtes réservées | Dr. Sébastien Lerner | Jérôme Portheault | TV series (1 episode) |
| 2013 | Boulevard du Palais | Coutanceau | Christian Bonnet | TV series (1 episode) |
| 2014 | Le sang de la vigne | Hugo Basler | Marc Rivière | TV series (1 episode) |
| 2014 | Guidestones | Brooklyn Cott | Jay Ferguson | TV series (11 episodes) |
| 2015 | Je Dis Call Me | The man | Michael Westbrook | Short |
| 2015 | Mongeville | Maxime Vinet | Bruno Garcia | TV series (1 episode) |
| 2015-2017 | Chérif | Lt. Pascal Garnier | Julien Zidi, Vincent Giovanni, ... | TV series (10 episodes) |
| 2016 | Elles... Les filles du Plessis | | Bénédicte Delmas | TV movie |
| 2016 | La stagiaire | Nicolas Delaunay | Christophe Campos | TV series (1 episode) |
| 2016-2017 | Agathe Koltès | Captain Fontaine | Christian Bonnet & Adeline Darraux | TV series (8 episodes) |
| 2017 | Meurtres en Auvergne | Etienne Romagnat | Thierry Binisti | TV movie |
| 2017 | Quartier des Banques | Alexandre Grangier | Fulvio Bernasconi | TV series (6 episodes) |
| 2018 | Les Disparus de Valenciennes | Mickaël Tortois | Elsa Bennett & Hippolyte Dard | TV movie |
| 2018 | Un Bébé pour Noël | | Eric Summer | TV movie |
| 2018 | Les Innocents | Prosecutor Vidal | Frédéric Berthe & François Ryckelynck | TV mini-series |
| 2020 | Modern Family | Guy | | Season 11 Episode 13: "Paris" |
| 2021-2024 | Emily in Paris | Laurent Grateau | Darren Star | TV series |
| 2024 | Brocéliande | Maxence Guivarch | Bruno Garcia | TV series |
| 2026 | Cat's Eyes | Michaël Heinz | Alexandre Laurent | TV series |

=== Producer ===
| Year | Title | Note |
|---|---|---|
| 2001 | Passage en caisse | Short |
