= The Early Years: Erik Nietzsche Part 1 =

2007 Danish film directed by Jacob Thuesen

The Early Years
- Directed by: Jacob Thuesen
- Written by: Lars von Trier (as Erik Nietzsche); Lars Kjeldgaard; Nikolaj Scherfig; Bo Hr. Hansen
- Produced by: Sisse Graum Jørgensen; Marie Gade Denessen
- Starring: Jonatan Spang
- Cinematography: Sebastian Blenkov
- Edited by: Per K. Kirkegaard
- Music by: Vincent D'Hondt
- Production company: Zentropa
- Release date: 25 December 2007
- Running time: 92 minutes
- Country: Denmark
- Language: Danish

The Early Years: Erik Nietzsche Part 1 (Danish: De unge år. Erik Nietzsche sagaen del 1) is a 2007 Danish comedy-drama film directed by Jacob Thuesen. Set at the National Film School of Denmark in 1979, it stars Jonatan Spang as the socially awkward student Erik Nietzsche.

It is a semi-biographical film inspired by Lars von Trier's time as a student, with a screenplay co-written by Trier who is credited as Erik Nietzsche. It is full of veiled portrayals and caricatures of people from Denmark's film world. Lone Scherfig was set to direct the film, but dropped out citing a scheduling conflict. Thuesen took over as director and filming began on 25 September 2006. The film was released in Danish cinemas on 25 December 2007.

== Cast ==
- Jonatan Spang as Erik
- David Dencik as Zelko
- Therese Damsgaard as Karin
- Mille Hoffmeyer Lehfeldt as Margrethe
- Carl Martin Norén as Göran
- Line Bie Rosenstjerne as Anna
- Malin Brolin-Tani as Stine
- Søren Pilmark as Principal Mads
- Troels Lyby as Bent Lyngaard
- Søren Malling as Hans Jørgen
- Dejan Čukić as Selkoff
- Nikolaj Coster-Waldau as Sammy
- Jens Albinus as Troels
- Thomas Bendixen as Thorvald
