= All for Two =

- Film poster
- Danish: Alle for to
- Directed by: Rasmus Heide
- Written by: Anders Thomas Jensen
- Starring: Jonatan Spang; Mick Øgendahl; Kurt Ravn; Rasmus Bjerg
- Distributed by: Nordisk Film
- Release date: 31 January 2013
- Running time: 1h 29min
- Country: Denmark
- Language: Danish

All for Two (Danish: Alle for to) is a 2013 Danish action comedy film directed by Rasmus Heide. It is a sequel to All for One.

== Cast ==
- Jonatan Spang as Nikolai
- Rasmus Bjerg as Timo
- Mick Øgendahl as Ralf
- Kurt Ravn as Arno
- Kim Bodnia as William Lynge
- Stine Stengade as Therese
- Gordon Kennedy as Toke
- Lise Koefoed as Ane
- Laura Christensen as Fiona
- Martin Buch as John
