= Guidestones =

Guidestones may refer to

- The Georgia Guidestones, a monument
- Guidestones (web series), an interactive conspiracy web series
- Fictional artefacts featured in the video game Homeworld
