= Crying for Love =

- Directed by: Christian E. Christiansen
- Written by: Christian E. Christiansen
- Based on: At Night by Christian E. Christiansen
- Produced by: Louise Vesth
- Starring: Pilou Asbæk
- Release date: August 1, 2008
- Country: Denmark
- Language: Danish

Crying for Love (Danish: Dig og Mig) is a Danish feature film. Written and directed by Christian E. Christiansen in 2008. It is based on the short film At Night, which was nominated for an Oscar in 2008.

== Synopsis ==
Three girls meet in hospital. Struggling to come to terms with their illnesses and the hand fate has dealt them, they look back on decisive moments in their lives. Their stories are different but the girls are brought together in their search for love and companionship.

== Awards and nominations ==
- Bodil Awards / Best Actress (Bedste kvindelige hovedrolle) / Laura Christensen
- Danish Film Awards (Robert)
  - Best Actress (Årets kvindelige hovedrolle) / Julie R. Ølgaard
  - Best Supporting Actor (Årets mandlige birolle) / Henrik Prip
  - Best Supporting Actress (Årets kvindelige birolle) / Laura Christensen
- Zulu 2009 Winner / Best Actress (Årets danske kvindelige hovedrolle) Laura Christensen / Neel Rønholt / Julie R. Ølgaard
