= List of science fiction television programs, L =

This is an inclusive list of science fiction television programs whose names begin with the letter L.

== L ==
Live-action

- L5: First City in Space (1996, docufiction)
- Lab Rats (2012–2016)
- Lab Rats: Elite Force (2016)
- Land of the Giants (1968–1970)
- Land of the Lost (franchise):
  - Land of the Lost (1974–1976)
  - Land of the Lost (1991–1992, Land of the Lost remake)
- Langoliers, The (1995, miniseries)
- Last Dinosaur, The (1977, Japan/US, film)
- Last Exile (franchise):
- Last Man on Planet Earth, The (1999, film)
- Last Train, The (1999, UK)
- Lathe of Heaven, The (1979, film)
- Lavender Castle (1999–2000, UK, stop-motion animation)
- Legacy of the Silver Shadow (2002, Australia)
- Legend (1995)
- Legend of Death (1965, UK)
- Legends of the Superheroes (1979)
- Legends of Tomorrow (2016–2022)
- Level 9 (2000–2001)
- Lexx (1997–2002, Canada/UK/Germany)
- Life Force (2000, UK)
- Life on Mars (franchise):
  - Life on Mars (2006–2007, UK)
  - Life on Mars (2008–2009, US, Life on Mars remake)
  - Ashes to Ashes (2008–2010, UK, Life on Mars sequel)
  - Chica de Ayer, La aka Girl from Yesterday, The (2009, Spain, Life on Mars remake)
- Lifepod (1993, film)
- Logan's Run (1977–1978)
- Lost (2004–2010)
- Lost Future, The (2010, film)
- Lost in Space (franchise)
  - Lost in Space (1965–1968)
  - Lost in Space (2018-2021)
- Lost Room, The (2006, miniseries)
- Lost Saucer, The (1975–1976)
- Lost Signs aka Mystère (2007, France, miniseries)
- Lost World, The (2001, film)
- Lottery, The (2014)
- Love War, The (1970, film)
- Luna (1983–1984, UK)

Animation

- Lampies, The (2001–2002, UK, animated)
  - Last Exile (2003, Japan, animated)
  - Last Exile: Fam, the Silver Wing (2011, Japan, animated, Last Exile sequel)
- Lazer Tag Academy (1986, animated)
- League of Super Evil aka L.O.S.E. (2009–2012, Canada, animated)
- Legend of the Galactic Heroes: Die Neue These (2018, Japan, animated)
- Legion of Super Heroes (2006–2008, animated)
- Lensman: Power of the Lens (1984–1985, Japan, animated)
- Lightspeed Electroid Albegas (1983–1984, Japan, animated)
- Lilo & Stitch (franchise):
  - Lilo & Stitch: The Series (2003–2006, animated)
  - Stitch! (2008–2011, Japan, animated)
  - Stitch & Ai (2017, China, animated)
- Lloyd in Space (2001–2004, animated)
- Loonatics Unleashed (2004–2007, animated)
- Lost Universe (1998, Japan, animated)
- Love, Death & Robots (2019–present, anthology, animated)
