= Christian Tafdrup =

Danish actor, director and screenwriter

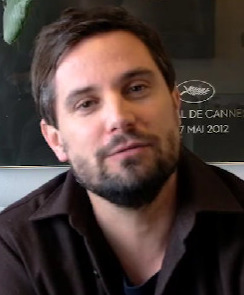
- Tafdrup in 2022
- Born: April 8, 1978 (age 48); Østerbro, Copenhagen, Denmark
- Occupations: Actor; director; screenwriter
- Years active: 1993–present
- Notable work: Parents (2016); Speak No Evil (2022)

Christian Tafdrup (born 8 April 1978) is a Danish actor, film director, and screenwriter. As a director, he is best known for his directorial debut Parents (2016) that won the 2017 Robert Award for Best Director, as well as his psychological thriller horror drama Speak No Evil (2022).

== Filmography ==
Tafdrup being interviewed in 2022 (in Danish)

=== As an actor ===
Year	Film	Role	Notes
1993	Pretty Boy	Nick	Film
1998	Strisser på Samsø	Spahic	TV series
2002	Debutanten	Hamlet	Short film
2003	OBLS		TV series documentary
2003	Baby	Håndlanger	Film
2005	The Big Day	Lars	Film
2005	Veninder	Ung fyr	Film
2005	Nynne	Man at restaurant	Film
2006	A Soap	Kunde 1	Film
2006	After the Wedding	Christian Refner	Film
2006	Gustne Gensyn	Various roles	TV series
2006	Princess	Charlie	Film
2006	Daisy Diamond	Thomas Lund	Film
2007	Tjenesten - nu på tv	Various roles	TV series
2008	Sommer	Reservelægen	TV series
2008	Album	Martin Lund Jensen	TV series
2008	Crying for Love	Oscar	Film
2008	I'll Come Running	Søren	Film
2009–2010	Park Road	Sune Holm	TV series
2011	Alla Salute!		TV series
2011	Anstalten	Oliver	TV series
2012	Lærkevej - Til døden os skiller	Sune Holm	Film
2012	The Killing	Thorsten Seifert	TV series
2013	Borgen	Alexander Hjort	TV series
2013–2014	Kødkataloget	Søren	TV series
2015	Bankerot	Læge	TV series
2015	Juleønsket	Atlas Berg	TV series
2016	Simon Talbots Sketch Show	Cucumber	TV series
2016	Parents	Real estate agent	Also director
2016	The Other World	Mikkel	TV series
2017	Never Again a Tomorrow	Studio host	Film
2017	A Terrible Woman	James	Film; also director
2017	Tinka's Christmas Adventure	Fileas	TV series
2018	Nipskanalen	Christian	TV series
2018	Parterapi	Peter	TV series
2018	Herrens Veje	Mikkel	TV series
2019	Tinka and the King's Game	Filias	TV series
2018–2020	Hånd i hånd	Øystein	TV series
2020	Grow	Jarl	TV series
2022	Tinka and the Mirror of the Soul	Fileas	TV series
2023	Meter i sekundet	Sebastian	Film; post-production

=== As director and screenwriter ===
Year	Film	Notes
1999	The Copier	Short film
2002	Debutanten	Short film
2008	Awakening	Short film
2016	Parents	Film
2017	A Horrible Woman	Film
2018–2020	Parterapi	TV series
2022	Speak No Evil	Film

== Selected awards ==
Year	Award	Category	Nominated work	Result	Ref.
2008	Buster International Children's Film Festival	Best Short Film	Awakening	Won	
2008	Odense International Film Festival	Best Children's Film	Awakening	Won	
2009	Robert Awards	Best Long Fiction/Animation (shared with Peter Reichhardt & Leila Vestgaard)	Awakening	Won	
2009	L.A. Outfest	Outstanding Narrative Short Film	Awakening	Won	
2009	Brest European Short Film Festival	Best Short Film	Awakening	Won	
2014	Robert Awards	Best Actor in a Supporting Television Role	Borgen	Won	
2016	Neuchâtel International Fantastic Film Festival	Best European Fantastic Feature Film	Parents	Won	
2017	Bodil Awards	Best Screenplay	Parents	Won	
2017	Robert Awards	Best Director	Parents	Won	
2018	Robert Awards	Best Screenplay (shared with Mads Tafdrup)	A Terrible Woman	Won	
2022	Bucheon International Fantastic Film Festival	Best Director Choice	Speak No Evil	Won	
2022	MOTELx - Festival Internacional de Cinema de Terror de Lisboa	Best European Feature Film	Speak No Evil	Won	
