= Le Ciel sur la tête =

Le Ciel sur la tête may refer to:

- Heaven on One's Head, a 1965 French film directed by Yves Ciampi
- On Your Head, a 2001 Canadian film directed by André Melançon and Geneviève Lefebvre
- Times Have Been Better, a 2006 French television film directed by Régis Musset
