= À l'aventure =

2008 film by Jean-Claude Brisseau

- Theatrical release poster
- Directed by: Jean-Claude Brisseau
- Written by: Jean-Claude Brisseau
- Produced by: Frédéric Niedermayer
- Starring: Carole Brana; Arnaud Binard; Nadia Chibani; Lise Bellynck; Estelle Galarme; Jocelyn Quivrin; Étienne Chicot
- Cinematography: Wilfrid Sempé
- Edited by: Lisa Heredia
- Music by: Jean Musy
- Production companies: Moby Dick Films; La Sorcière Rouge
- Distributed by: Shellac
- Release dates: 29 August 2008 (Montréal World Film Festival); 1 April 2009 (France)
- Running time: 90 minutes
- Country: France
- Language: French

À l'aventure is a 2008 French erotic drama film written and directed by Jean-Claude Brisseau. The film showed at the 2009 International Film Festival Rotterdam.

== Plot ==
Sandrine, a young and childless woman, meets a friend for a sandwich lunch on a park bench. Also on the bench is an old man who tries to start a conversation. Her friend is annoyed and leaves, but Sandrine is intrigued by the old man's remarks: the seed of independence has been planted in her. She stands up to her boyfriend, who leaves her, and quits her dull job.

In a café she sees Greg, a handsome young man who is studying a book on psychiatry, and asks him to tell her about it. They end up spending the afternoon in a hotel room making love. He asks her to a dinner party where she can meet Mina, a woman whose approach to a man is total submission, allowing him to do what he wants. He puts Mina under hypnosis and she regresses to being a Flemish nun in the 1400s.

In time, Sandrine finds that her journey with Greg and Mina into multiple sexual and spiritual encounters is not bringing enlightenment or fulfilment. She tells the old man, who she has kept in touch with, and he says that it has all been immature and dangerous. He advises her to root herself back in reality.

== Cast ==
- Carole Brana as Sandrine
- Arnaud Binard as Greg
- Étienne Chicot as the bench man
- Jocelyn Quivrin as Fred
- Lise Bellynck as Sophie
- Nadia Chibani as Mina
- Estelle Galarme as Françoise
- Frédéric Aspisi as Jérôme
- Michèle Larue as Sandrine's mother
- Manica Brini as Sandrine's sister
