= ID A =

ID:A
- Directed by: Christian E. Christiansen
- Written by: Tine Krull Petersen
- Based on: På knivens æg by Anne Chaplin Hansen
- Produced by: Louise Vesth
- Starring: Tuva Novotny
- Cinematography: Ian Hansen
- Edited by: Bodil Kjærhauge; Anders Refn
- Music by: Kristian Eidnes Andersen
- Release date: 24 November 2011 (Denmark)
- Running time: 104 minutes
- Countries: Denmark; Netherlands; Sweden
- Language: Danish

ID:A is a 2011 thriller film directed by Christian E. Christiansen and starring Tuva Novotny.

== Cast ==
- Tuva Novotny as Aliena / Ida
- Flemming Enevold as Just
- Carsten Bjørnlund as Martin
- Arnaud Binard as Pierre
- John Buijsman as Rob
- Rogier Philipoom as Guus
- Jens Jørn Spottag as HP
- Marie Louise Wille as Marietta
- Françoise Lebrun as Isabelle
- Koen Wouterse as Tim

== Awards and nominations ==
ID:A was nominated for three Robert Awards, for Best Actress, Best Editor, and Best Special Effects, but lost out to Melancholia in all three categories.
