= Gustne Gensyn =

Gustne Gensyn is a Danish satirical TV show running on the Danish TV channel TV 2 Zulu. The show consists of small sketches, which are all connected by the theme that they are supposedly 20–50-year-old shows, although they are created for the show itself.

As its subtitle reveals: klip fra gamle tv-programmer der aldrig har eksisteret (English: clips from old TV shows that never existed). The title roughly translates to gross reruns.

== Overview ==
Each show starts with the host Glenn Thorsboe, played by Jonatan Spang, introducing the viewer to the program, often claiming how the old days were better than the modern. Soon a small sketch, which is supposedly an old TV show, is shown. The clips usually seem real at first, but something utterly odd or awkward soon happens.

In one of the sketches under the title Lørdags Halløj (Danish: Saturday Fun), they play a game called Ved De hvor De er? (Danish: Do you know where you are?; note that the formal singular version is used in Danish), where an actor playing a professor from the Odense University is hit in the head with a sledge hammer by the host, and forgets where he is.

== Cast ==
Although only one person plays a specific role, there are regular people on the show playing different roles, and the host manages to pull off jokes in some of the sketches.

- Jonatan Spang
- Brian Mørk
- Michael Christiansen
- Carsten Eskelund
- Christian Tafdrup

== Technical features ==
According to the producer, Thomas Glud, the show is actually recorded with equipment used during the era the sketches claim to be from. The purpose is to convey realism. Thus, black-and-white and out-of-focus shots are common in some sketches.
