= Midsomer =

Midsomer may refer to–

- Midsomer Norton, a town in England
- Midsomer, a fictional county in England that is the setting of the TV series Midsomer Murders

== See also ==
- Midsommer
- Midsommar
