= Louise Vesth =

Danish film producer

Louise Vesth (born 18 March 1973) is a Danish film producer . Her short film Om natten was nominated for an Oscar in the category Best Short Film in 2008.

== Early life ==
Louise Vesth graduated from the Aarhus School of Business with a bachelor's degree in economics in 1995 . She then worked for the production company Jutlandia Film for two years before attending Den Danske Filmskole. In 2001 she graduated as a producer.

== Career ==
Vesth then produced several films for the Danish film production company Zentropa, starting in 2002 with the children's film Nenn michsim Axel, which was nominated for Robert and won the Grand Prize of the German Children's Fund at the 2003 Berlinale.

From 2005 to 2009 she produced the Danish sitcom Klovn and the following year a film based on it. Klovn: The Movie won the audience prize at the Robert Festival, was nominated for the Bodil nomination and was in Denmark the most successful film of 2010. Another television production Vesths was the 2008 TV 2 broadcast TV Advent Mikkel og guldkortet.

Vesth worked successfully with the Danish director Christian E. Christiansen (* 1972), among others . For their 2007 short film Om natten (international title: At Night), in which three young women suffering from cancer spend Christmas together in a clinic, Vesth and Christiansen received an Oscar nomination the following year . They also made films such as the drama Råzone, the children's film Zoomer and the thriller ID: A - Identity Anonymous .

The European Film Promotion counted Vesth 2008 among the Producers on the Move, d. H. to the young aspiring film producers in Europe.

In 2011 Vesth was one of the producers of Lars von Trier's award-winning science fiction film drama Melancholia, for which she won the European Film Award for Best Film.

Vesth produced the comedy The Truth About Men with Danish director Nikolaj Arcel in 2010 and the period film The Queen and the Personal Doctor in 2012 . In 2013 she produced Lars von Trier's drama Nymphomaniac . She is also a producer of a series of Adler-Olsen -Verfilmungen where Nikolaj Lie Kaas and Fares Fares play the main roles, starting in 2013 with compassion, about the published in the following year film desecration (Book template desecration), Salvation (2016; book presentation redemption) and contempt (2018; original book contempt).

In 2013 Vesth was awarded the Erik Ballings travel grant, which includes prize money of 50,000 kroner.

== Filmography ==
- 2002: Just call me Axel (Kald mig bare Aksel)
- 2003: Kopps
- 2003: 2 ryk and 1 aflevering
- 2005–2009: Klovn (TV series, 37 episodes)
- 2005: Zozo
- 2006: Råzone
- 2007: Lazy in Denmark (Hvordan vi slipper af med de andre)
- 2007: Om natten
- 2007: Ekko
- 2008: Dig og mig
- 2008: Mikkel og guldkortet (TV series, 24 episodes)
- 2009: Zoomer (Zoomerne)
- 2009: The Orange Girl (Appelsinpiken)
- 2010: The Truth About Men (Sandheden om mænd)
- 2010: Klovn: The Movie
- 2011: Melancholia
- 2011: ID: A - Identity anonymous (ID: A)
- 2012: The Queen and the Personal Physician (En kongelig affære)
- 2013: Nymphomaniac
- 2013: Mercy (Kvinden i buret)
- 2014: Lev strengthens
- 2014: Desecration (Fasandræberne)
- 2016: Redemption (Flaskepost fra P)
- 2018: The House That Jack Built
- 2018: Contempt (Journal 64)
- 2022: Riget Exodus (The Kingdom Exodus) (miniseries, 5 episodes)
- 2023: The Promised Land
