= Solstice (film) =

- DVD cover
- Directed by: Daniel Myrick
- Screenplay by: Daniel Myrick; Marty Musatov; Ethan Erwin
- Based on: Midsommer by: Carsten Myllerup; Rasmus Heisterberg
- Produced by: Adam Del Deo; James D. Stern
- Starring: Elisabeth Harnois; Shawn Ashmore; Amanda Seyfried; Hilarie Burton; Tyler Hoechlin
- Cinematography: M. David Mullen
- Edited by: Mathilde Bonnefoy
- Music by: Jane Antonia Cornish
- Production companies: Endgame Entertainment; Solstice Productions
- Distributed by: The Weinstein Company
- Release date: January 1, 2008 (United States)
- Running time: 91 minutes
- Country: United States
- Language: English

Solstice is a 2007 American horror film directed by Daniel Myrick, written by Myrick, Marty Musatov, and Ethan Erwin. It starred Elisabeth Harnois, Shawn Ashmore, Hilarie Burton, Amanda Seyfried, Tyler Hoechlin, Matt O'Leary, and R. Lee Ermey. It is a remake of the 2003 film Midsommer.

== Plot ==
Teenager Megan (Elisabeth Harnois), still distraught over her twin sister Sophie's suicide, reluctantly agrees to join her friends on a summer trip to a lake house in the bayous of Louisiana. On the way, at a gas station, they meet Nick (Tyler Hoechlin), who provides the group with information on voodoo and other local superstitions.

As soon as they arrive at the house, Megan suspects Sophie is trying to communicate with her, as a solstice — the time when our world and the next are closest — approaches. Megan goes running and trips, splitting her nail (something she had foreseen in several nightmares). As she limps back to the house, she meets a suspicious local resident, Leonard (R. Lee Ermey); inside his pickup truck, she finds a hat identical to one Sophie had owned.

The night before the solstice, Nick joins the group at the house for dinner. Megan tells him about Sophie's key chain, something she is trying to get rid of but it keeps returning, and that she thinks she is being haunted by Sophie's lost ghost. The six of them later go swimming and Nick calls for any spirits with wine; Megan is dragged under the water. Megan then, advised by Nick, wraps the key chain in a white cloth and buries it outside, which he says should expel the spirit. She goes for a bath, finding mud running out of the taps, and then sees the key chain lying on the floor.

The following day, Megan goes to Leonard's house and, inside, finds a young girl's bedroom (presumably his daughter); newspaper cuttings explain a young girl called Malin disappeared from the town a year earlier. Megan realises she is being haunted by Malin, not Sophie. Megan takes Nick to where she tripped on her run, followed by the group of friends, including Christian (Shawn Ashmore) who brings a gun. Nick and Megan get split up, and Christian almost shoots Nick. Megan then digs up Malin's body and finds that the key on the key chain is for Malin's bicycle, which was buried with her. They call the local police.

Christian finally admits that the year before, when they all came to the lake house without Megan, he and Sophie were on a drive and accidentally hit Malin. In fear of being arrested, they buried her in the forest, and Sophie later committed suicide as she could not bear the guilt. Malin's ghost appears, and Christian runs away towards the road. Megan chases him through the forest but before she can reach him, he is hit by the police car that had been called out.

The ending shows Megan at Malin's grave. When Leonard arrives home, he finds Malin's key chain on the porch, put there by Megan. Megan and Nick decide to go to the city to start a life together.

== Cast ==
- Elisabeth Harnois as Megan, a teenager who travels with her friends to a remote lake house during the summer solstice. Once there, she begins to feel a presence she believes to be that of her deceased twin sister Sophie, who has recently committed suicide.
- Shawn Ashmore as Christian, Megan's love interest.
- Tyler Hoechlin as Nick, a resident of the town who works at a nearby gas station.
- Amanda Seyfried as Zoe, Megan's best friend.
- Hilarie Burton as Alicia, Mark's girlfriend and a friend of Megan's.
- Matt O'Leary as Mark, Alicia's boyfriend.
- R. Lee Ermey as Leonard, a local resident whom the group finds suspicious.
- Jenna Hildebrand as Malin, a local girl who inexplicably went missing around a year earlier.
- Lisa Arnold as Mrs. Thomas
- David Dahlgren as Mr. Thomas
- Mark Krasnoff as Cop

== Production ==
Myrick announced the imminent shooting of Solstice while working on The Strand in 2005. He said he hoped that it would "hark back to elemental horror films like Rosemary's Baby and The Shining." The film met with problems due to Hurricane Katrina and production was postponed. Filming commenced in New Orleans in April, 2006, shooting in the Garden District and in bayous around Louisiana. Endgame Entertainment developed, produced, and fully financed the film.

== Release ==
Solstice released direct to video on January 1, 2008, by The Weinstein Company. Throughout the year, the film had international releases in Germany, Philippines and Greece. It had a theatrical release on June 19 in Russia, and a US television debut on Lifetime Television on July 26, before release in South Korea, Netherlands, Italy, the United Kingdom, Iceland and Mexico.

== Critical response ==
Solstice has received mixed reviews upon release.

Don Sumner of Best Horror Movies felt the production values were comparable with large-budget films and that both the story and performances were believable and genuine, making the film interesting enough to keep the viewer's attention. However, he also felt that the expected scares and suspense might make for an argument that the film was not a horror and was actually a ghostly drama/thriller. Bloody Disgusting felt that the music score was the only highlight in an otherwise boring film, granting that as a remake of the Danish film Midsommer, where the story, overused locale, etc. could not be attributed to Myrick or the other new writers, it is wondered why the choice was made to not make it more interesting, as even the feeling of danger was not present. For Dread Central, Steve Barton also found the pacing to be lagging when they wrote "The pacing of Solstice drags the viewer to the finish line nearly half asleep". And in referring to director Daniel Myrick, "Coming from a guy whose body of work has been anything but cookie-cutter, Solstice disappoints with its surprising blandness and heavy-handed mediocrity." E-Splatter was also disappointed in Myrick's work, comparing it negatively to The Blair Witch Project and writing that it was "a bit of a bummer to see the filmmaker behind such a kick-ass movie helming a direct-to-video horror film that's as tame as this. As reviled as it was by some horror fans, 'The Blair Witch Project' definitely had an edge. This film absolutely, positively has none."
