= The Kingdom (miniseries) =

Danish television series

- The title screen for Riget
- Also known as: The Kingdom II; The Kingdom: Exodus
- Danish: Riget, Riget II, Riget: Exodus
- Genre: Absurdist comedy Black comedy Medical drama Paranormal; Psychological drama Supernatural horror
- Created by: Lars von Trier and Tómas Gislason
- Written by: Lars von Trier (seasons 1-3); Niels Vørsel (seasons 1-3); Tómas Gislason (season 1)
- Directed by: Lars von Trier (seasons 1-3); Morten Arnfred (seasons 1-2)
- Starring: Ernst-Hugo Järegård; Kirsten Rolffes; Holger Juul Hansen; Søren Pilmark; Ghita Nørby; Jens Okking; Birthe Neumann; Otto Brandenburg; Erik Wedersøe; Annevig Schelde Ebbe; Baard Owe; Birgitte Raaberg; John Hahn-Petersen; Peter Mygind; Vita Jensen; Henning Jensen; Morten Rotne Leffers; Solbjørg Højfeldt; Udo Kier
- Country of origin: Denmark
- Original languages: Danish; Swedish
- No. of seasons: 3
- No. of episodes: 13

Production
- Executive producers: Svend Abrahamsen (season 1–2); Peter Aalbæk Jensen (season 1); Vibeke Windeløv (season 2)
- Producers: Ole Reim (season 1); Bosse Lindquist (season 2); Louise Vesth (season 3)
- Cinematography: Eric Kress
- Editors: Molly Malene Stensgaard; Jacob Thuesen; Pernille Bech Christensen
- Camera setup: Multi-camera
- Running time: 58–78 minutes
- Production companies: ARTE; Danmarks Radio (DR)

Original release
- Network: Danmarks Radio
- Release: 24 November 1994 – 31 October 1997
- Network: Viaplay
- Release: 9 October – 30 October 2022

Related
- Kingdom Hospital

The Kingdom (Danish: Riget) is a Danish absurdist supernatural horror miniseries trilogy created by Lars von Trier and Tómas Gislason. Set in the neurosurgical ward of Copenhagen's Rigshospitalet (lit. 'The National Hospital', nicknamed "Riget", lit. 'the realm' or 'the kingdom'), each episode of the show follows the hospital's eccentric staff and patients as they encounter bizarre and sometimes supernatural phenomena. The series is notable for its wry humor, its muted sepia colour scheme, and the appearance of a chorus of dishwashers with Down syndrome, who discuss in intimate detail the strange occurrences in the hospital. The theme song was written by von Trier himself.

The first series of four episodes premiered from DR in November to December 1994, and was followed by a second series, Riget II, which aired in November 1997. A belated third and final series of five episodes, directed by von Trier and written by von Trier with Niels Vørsel, titled Exodus, began filming in 2021 and was screened out of competition at the Venice Film Festival and at the Serial Killer festival in September 2022, and premiered on Nordic streaming platform Viaplay with the first two episodes on 9 October. The series premiered in select regions between 27 November and 25 December on streaming platform MUBI.

Von Trier has credited David Lynch's 1990 television series Twin Peaks and the 1965 French miniseries Belphegor as inspirations for the series. The Kingdom itself inspired an American series, Kingdom Hospital, developed by novelist Stephen King; the American version aired on ABC between March and July 2004, and was cancelled after a single season.

== Plot synopsis ==
Each episode of all three series opens with the same prologue, detailing how the hospital, Rigshospitalet in Copenhagen, was built on the site of the "bleaching ponds", which recur in the name of the street of the hospital's official address, Blegdamsvej, although the exact significance of the reference is never explicitly discussed in the series.

The show begins with the admission of a spiritualist patient, Sigrid Drusse (Kirsten Rolffes), who hears the sound of a girl crying in the elevator shaft. Upon investigation, Drusse discovers that the girl had died decades earlier, having been killed by her father to hide her illegitimacy. In order to put the spirit to rest, Drusse searches for the girl's body and ultimately finds it preserved in a specimen jar in the office of the hospital's professor of pathology, Professor Bondo (Baard Owe).

Meanwhile, neurosurgeon Stig Helmer (Ernst-Hugo Järegård), a recent appointee from Sweden to the neurosurgery department, tries to cover up his responsibility for a botched operation which left a young girl in a persistent vegetative state.

Pathologist Dr. Palle Bondo (Baard Owe) attempts to convince the family of a man dying from liver cancer to donate his liver to the hospital for Bondo's research. (In fact, Bondo wants it as a trophy, as it is the second largest hepatosarcoma ever recorded.) When denied, Bondo has the cancerous liver transplanted into his own body (as the patient signed an organ donor form), so that the cancer will become his personal property and can be kept within the hospital.

Amongst other plotlines, a young medical student becomes attracted to the nurse in charge of the sleep research laboratory, a ghostly ambulance appears and disappears every night, a junior doctor runs a black market in medical supplies, and a neurosurgeon discovers that she was impregnated by a ghost and that the baby in her womb is developing abnormally rapidly. In every episode, two dishwashers (each with Down syndrome) in the cellar discuss the strange happenings at Riget, and Helmer screams his famous catchphrase: "Danskjävlar!" (subtitled as "Danish scum", but literally "Danish devils").

In the third series, Exodus, sleepwalker Karen Svensson finds herself at Rigshospitalet, investigating the fallout of the fatal power outage at the end of the second series. Exodus also introduces Dr. Helmer, Jr. (Mikael Persbrandt), the neurotic son of the late Stig Helmer, and a new addition to the staff of Riget. Helmer Jr. is threatened with a lawsuit after making sexual advances to a female colleague in the hospital, has to consult a Swedish lawyer (Alexander Skarsgard), son of the lawyer from season 2.

== Cast ==
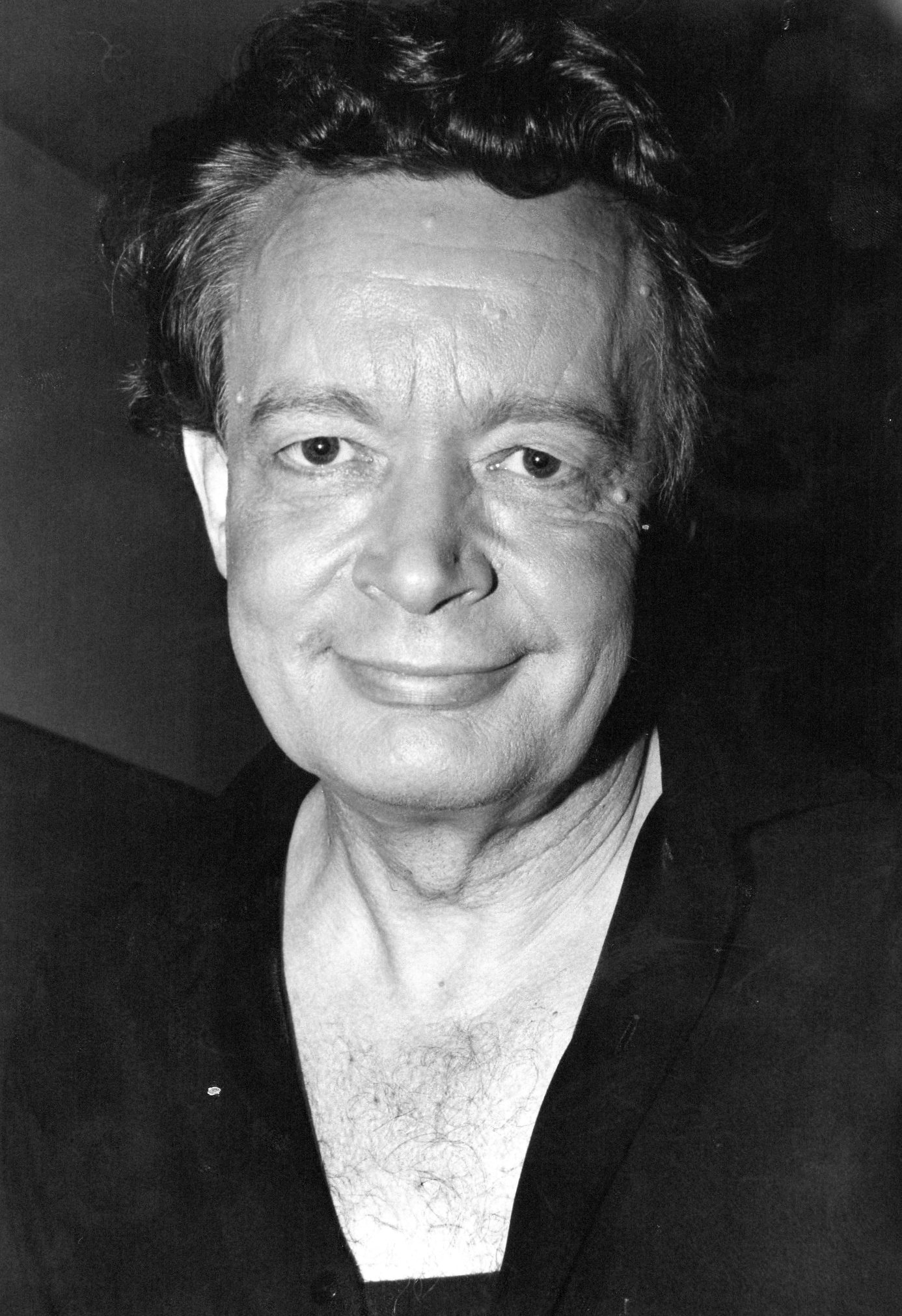
Ernst-Hugo Järegård as Stig Helmer, a Dane-hating Swedish doctor

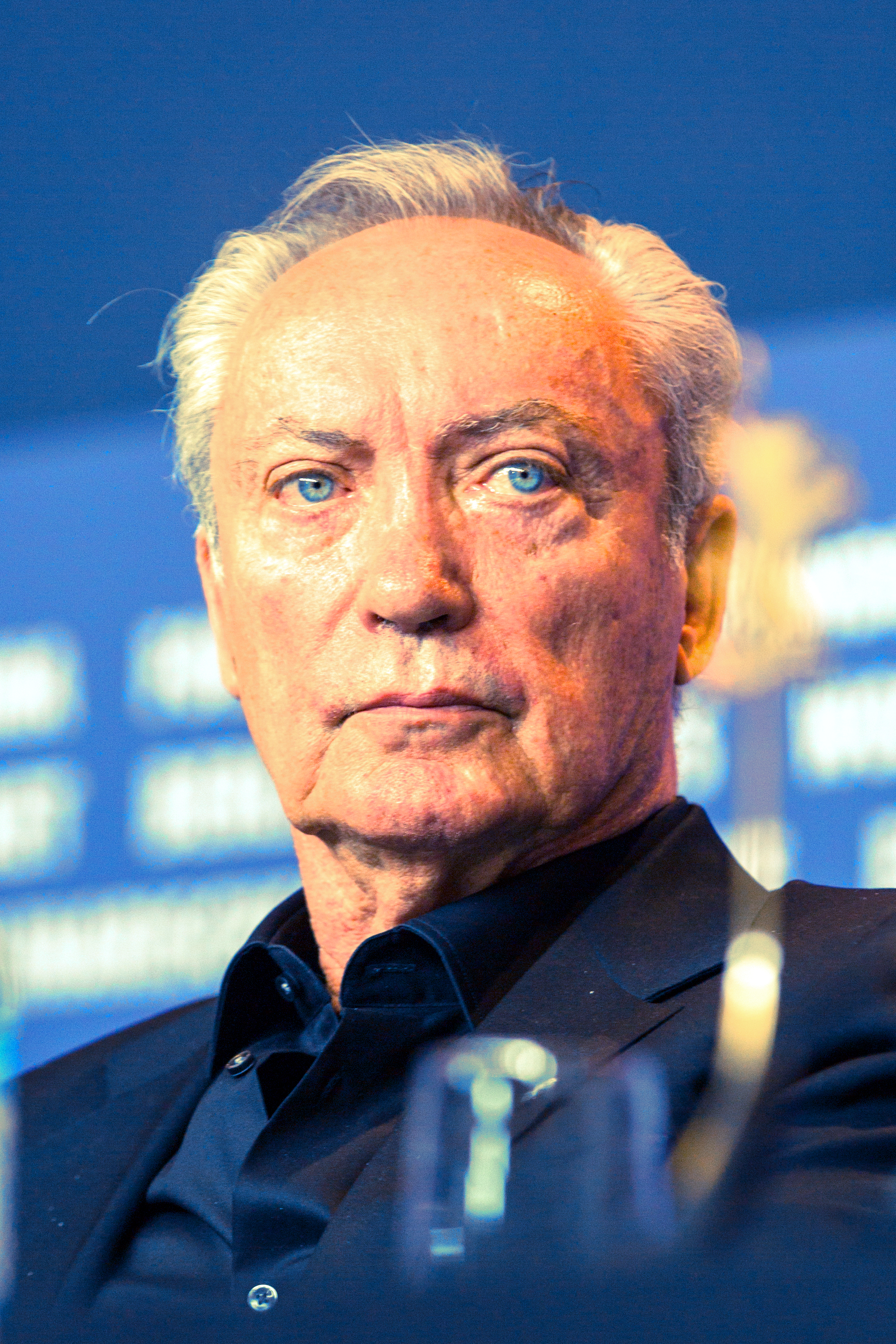
German actor Udo Kier (pictured in 2018) appears in a dual role as the antagonist Åge Krüger and his infant son Little Brother

Actor	Character	Season		
Actor	Character	I	II	Exodus
Søren Pilmark	Jørgen 'Hook' Krogshøj	Main	Main	Main
Ghita Nørby	Rigmor Mortensen	Main	Main	Main
Birgitte Raaberg	Judith Petersen	Main	Main	Main
Peter Mygind	Morten 'Mogge' Moesgaard	Main	Main	Main
Ernst-Hugo Järegård	Stig Helmer	Main	Main	Archive
Kirsten Rolffes	Sigrid Drusse	Main	Main	Archive
Holger Juul Hansen	Einar Moesgaard	Main	Main	Archive
Jens Okking	Bulder Harly Drusse	Main	Main	Archive
Baard Owe	Palle Bondo	Main	Main	Archive
Bodil Jørgensen	Karen Svensson			Main
Nicolas Bro	Balder 'Bulder'			Main
Nikolaj Lie Kaas	Filip Naver			Main
Lars Mikkelsen	Pontopidan			Main
Mikael Persbrandt	Stig Helmer Jr.			Main
Tuva Novotny	Anna			Main
Ida Engvoll	Kalle			Main
Otto Brandenburg	Hansen	Main	Main	
Annevig Schelde Ebbe	Mary Krüger	Main	Recurring	Archive
Udo Kier	Åge Krüger / Little Brother / Frederik / Big Brother	Main	Main	Main
Vita Jensen	Female dishwasher	Main	Main	
Morten Rotne Leffers	Male dishwasher	Main	Main	
Jasmine Junker	Female dishwasher			Main
Jesper Sørensen	Male dishwasher			Main
Solbjørg Højfeldt	Camilla	Main	Recurring	Main
Birthe Neumann	Fru Svendsen		Main	Main
Erik Wedersøe	Ole		Main	
John Hahn-Petersen	Secretary Nivesen		Main	
Henning Jensen	Director Bob	Recurring	Main	Main
Laura Christensen	Mona Jensen	Recurring	Recurring	Main
Vera Gebuhr	Gerda		Guest	
Ole Boisen	Christian	Recurring	Recurring	
Louise Fribo	Sanne Jeppesen	Recurring	Recurring	
Nis Bank-Mikkelsen	Chaplain	Guest	Guest	
Thomas Bo Larsen	Falkon		Guest	
Henrik Koefoed	Radiologist	Guest		
Paul Hüttel	Steenbæk	Guest	Guest	Guest
Helle Virkner	Emma Mogensen	Guest	Guest	
Stellan Skarsgård	The Swedish Lawyer		Guest	
Alexander Skarsgård	The Swedish Lawyer's Son			Guest
David Dencik	Bosse			Guest
Willem Dafoe	Grand Duc			Guest
Lars von Trier	Himself; Satan	Uncredited	Uncredited	Uncredited

== Production ==
=== Riget: Exodus (2022) ===
In December 2020, Danmarks Radio announced that a third and final season, consisting of five episodes directed by von Trier and co-written by von Trier alongside original series co-writer Niels Vørsel, would begin filming in 2021 under the title Riget: Exodus. The same year, von Trier began showing symptoms of Parkinson's disease during an interview with Christian Lund of Louisiana Channel; afterwards, he continued to work while taking medication. Von Trier did not watch "all the old ones" before beginning work on Riget: Exodus, and had tried "to get rid of the ties from the old stuff", with the focus being on the characters.

Returning cast members Ghita Nørby, Søren Pilmark, Peter Mygind, Birgitte Raaberg, Laura Christensen and Udo Kier are joined by newcomers Bodil Jørgensen, Nicolas Bro, Lars Mikkelsen, Nikolaj Lie Kaas, Mikael Persbrandt, Tuva Novotny, Ida Engvoll, Asta Kamma August, David Dencik, Alexander Skarsgard and Willem Dafoe. Von Trier had a "rotten time" filming the series, as he suffered from the effects of Parkinson's disease during the shoot, but hoped the actors "didn't notice".

In September 2022, Exodus (presented as a "five hour feature-length film") screened out of competition at the 79th Venice International Film Festival, alongside Nicolas Winding Refn's miniseries Copenhagen Cowboy.

== Episodes ==
Series	Episodes	Originally released	
Series	Episodes	First released	Last released
1	4	24 November 1994	15 December 1994
2	4	10 October 1997	31 October 1997
3	5	9 October 2022	30 October 2022

=== Riget (1994) ===
No.	Title	Directed by	Written by	Original release date
1	"Den hvide flok (The Unheavenly Host)"	Lars von Trier, Morten Arnfred	Lars von Trier, Niels Vørsel, Tómas Gislason	24 November 1994
Mrs Drusse, a hypochondriac psychic, gets herself admitted to the Kingdom because she believes the hospital is haunted. Meanwhile, Dr Helmer, a Dane-hating Swede under investigation for malpractice, joins the hospital's secret brethren.
2	"Alliancen kalder (Thy Kingdom Come)"	Lars von Trier, Morten Arnfred	Lars von Trier, Niels Vørsel, Tómas Gislason	1 December 1994
Mrs Drusse continues her investigation, Krogshøj steals the severed head from Mogge and uses it to blackmail him, while Bondo is at his wits' end when a patient's relative refuses to hand over his liver, which is infected with a rare cancer.
3	"Et fremmed legeme (A Foreign Body)"	Lars von Trier, Morten Arnfred	Lars von Trier, Niels Vørsel, Tómas Gislason	8 December 1994
Dr Helmer decides to steal the incriminating report but unbeknownst to him, Krogshøj has the same plan, Bondo wants to transplant the cancerous liver into himself, and Mrs Drusse finds out Mary didn't die of tuberculosis as reported.
4	"De levende døde (The Living Dead)"	Lars von Trier, Morten Arnfred	Lars von Trier, Niels Vørsel, Tómas Gislason	15 December 1994
Helmer goes to Haiti which angers his gun-wielding girlfriend, Judith may be pregnant with a ghost, Mrs Drusse reburies Mary's remains but her troubles are only just beginning, and Operation Morning Breeze turns into a farcical disaster.

=== Riget II (1997) ===
No.	Title	Directed by	Written by	Original release date
5	"Mors in Tabula (Death on the Operation Table)"	Lars von Trier, Morten Arnfred	Lars von Trier, Niels Vørsel	10 October 1997
Helmer returns from Haiti with the zombie poison, but has trouble administering it, Mrs Drusse is back in the Kingdom after being struck by a van, and Judith has to learn to love her deformed son.
6	"Trækfuglene (Birds of Passage)"	Lars von Trier, Morten Arnfred	Lars von Trier, Niels Vørsel	17 October 1997
Mrs Drusse has a new spiritual mystery to solve, and Judith continues to care for her deformed son, now named Little Brother. Meanwhile, Helmer attempts to administer the antidote for the poison to Kroshgøj before it’s too late, as to avoid another legal conundrum.
7	"Gargantua"	Lars von Trier, Morten Arnfred	Lars von Trier, Niels Vørsel	24 October 1997
Krogshøj is revived but different than before, Christian becomes the new Falcon, the Little Brother wants to die, and Mrs Drusse learns of Age Krüger’s form as a demon. Inspired by her son's dream, she takes a flight around the hospital.
8	"Pandæmonium"	Lars von Trier, Morten Arnfred	Lars von Trier, Niels Vørsel	31 October 1997
Helmer, blackmailed into marriage by Rigmor, kidnaps Mona, Krogshøj considers eugenics, Mrs Drusse discovers a satanic sect beneath the hospital, Judith won't let her son die, Bondo finds his half-brother, and Christian races blind.

=== Riget: Exodus (2022) ===
No.	Title	Directed by	Written by	Original release date
9	"Halmar"	Lars von Trier	Lars von Trier, Niels Vørsel	9 October 2022
A mysterious voice calls upon the sleep walker, Karen, during a nightmare. The Kingdom is in need of her assistance, and at the hospital, she finds an ally in the porter, Bulder.
10	"The Congress Dances"	Lars von Trier	Lars von Trier, Niels Vørsel	9 October 2022
Karen has a new vision that could possibly aid her in locating the voice. At The Kingdom, preparations are being made for the annual pain congress, but it seems that the demon, Grand Duc, is on the guest list.
11	"Big Brother"	Lars von Trier	Lars von Trier, Niels Vørsel	16 October 2022
Karen locates the spiritual core of The Kingdom. Helmer discovers what he was looking for at the hospital, but after a violent clash with Naver, he realizes that things do not always proceed according to plan.
12	"Barbarossa"	Lars von Trier	Lars von Trier, Niels Vørsel	23 October 2022
Karen attempts to solve the task that was given to her, but evil forces work against her and Bulder. Helmer has had it with the Danish stupidity and plans an act of terrorism against the Danes and The Kingdom itself.
13	"Exodus"	Lars von Trier	Lars von Trier, Niels Vørsel	30 October 2022
Karen, Krogen and Bulder are fighting against the clock. The time has come to clean The Kingdom of all evil spirits once and for all, but much can still go wrong.

== Release ==
The four-episode first series of Riget was aired by Danish broadcaster Danmarks Radio (DR) from 24 November to 15 December 1994. The English subtitled version The Kingdom aired in the United Kingdom on BBC Two from 1 to 9 April 1997.

The four-episode second series, Riget II, aired on DR between 10 and 31 October 1997. The English subtitled version The Kingdom II aired in the United Kingdom on BBC Two from 28 July to 1 September 2001.

The five-episode third series, Riget: Exodus, premiered on streaming platform Viaplay on 9 October 2022.

=== Home media ===
The series was edited into a five-hour, two-part film, which received some theatrical exhibition, and was released on home video in America and the United Kingdom. It is available on DVD in Australia and New Zealand on Madman Entertainment's Directors Suite label, in the UK from Second Sight, and in the US from Koch-Lorber Films. Following their restoration of the first two series using original film negatives, Mubi released all three series to Blu-ray in April 2024 as part of a 7-disc box set.

=== Streaming ===
Newly restored HD editions of the first two series premiered on MUBI on 13 November and 20 November 2022, respectively; the debut of the restored series was followed by the premiere of Exodus on the platform on 27 November, with its fifth and final episode premiering on Christmas Day.

== Reception ==
=== Critical reception ===
On Metacritic, all three seasons has a weighted average score of 78 out of 100.

==== I and II ====
Film critic Leonard Maltin, who reviewed the two-part theatrical version, awarded it three and a half out of a possible four stars, calling it "a must-see for those who think they've seen everything".

Despite being a miniseries, The Kingdom appears in the best-selling book 1001 Movies You Must See Before You Die, where it is called "a medical horror epic", with its supernatural elements described as being both eerie and magical.

==== Exodus ====
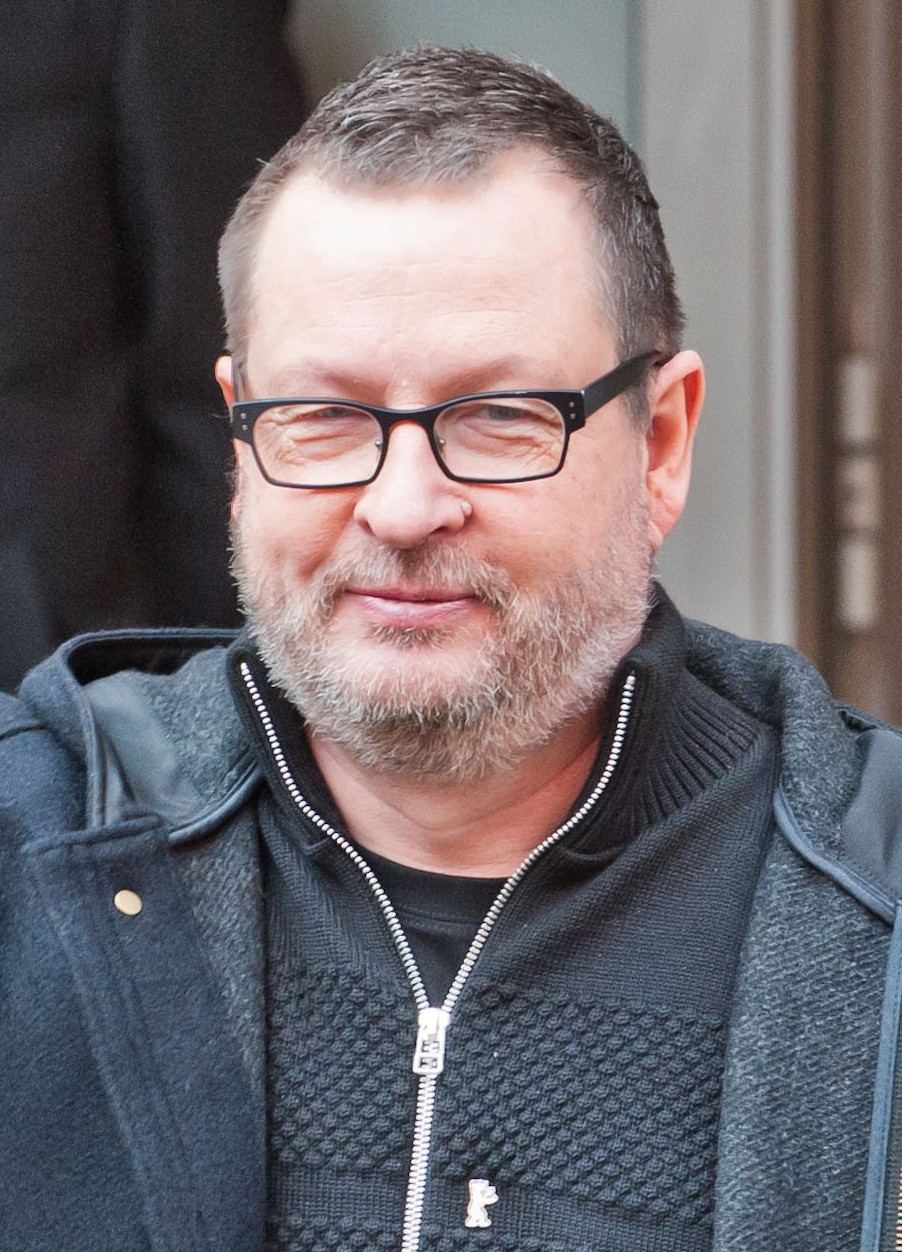
Lars von Trier at the Berlin Film Festival in 2014.

On review aggregation website Rotten Tomatoes, 87% of 23 reviews are positive and the average rating is 6.80/10. The site's critical consensus reads, "An acquired taste for newcomers and comfort weirdness for Lars von Trier's devotees, The Kingdom: Exodus is a cheeky delicacy infused with cosmic horror that reaches biblically insane proportions." On Metacritic, it has a weighted average of 77 out of 100 from nine reviews, indicating a generally positive reception.

Exodus was well received by critics following its premiere at the Venice in September 2022, with Variety calling it "over-the-top" and "fun", and the Italian Post praised the series, saying it "amuses and disturbs", and comparing it positively to Twin Peaks. The Upcoming gave the series 3/5, praising its "dark humour" and noting that it feels like a "tribute to Lars von Trier's career, a revisiting of his early work... filled with the wobbly handheld shots that distinguished the Dogme 95 movement". Giving it 3/5 stars, The Guardian called the series "a nightmarish revue, peppered with familiar faces in brief walk-on roles", and said that it is "fun to a point and richly textured to a fault, with a plot that’s entirely driven by what has gone before".

=== Accolades ===
Award	Category	Recipient(s)	Result	Ref.
1995 Bodil Awards	Best Danish Film	Riget	Won	
1995 Bodil Awards	Best Actor	Ernst-Hugo Järegård	Won	
1995 Bodil Awards	Best Actress	Kirsten Rolffes	Won	
1995 Bodil Awards	Best Supporting Actor	Holger Juul Hansen	Won	
30th Karlovy Vary International Film Festival	Crystal Globe	Riget	Nominated	
30th Karlovy Vary International Film Festival	Best Director Award	Lars von Trier	Won	
30th Karlovy Vary International Film Festival	Best Actor Award	Ernst-Hugo Järegård	Won	
12th Robert Awards	Best Actor in a Leading Role	Ernst-Hugo Järegård	Won	
12th Robert Awards	Best Actress in a Leading Role	Kirsten Rolffes	Won	
12th Robert Awards	Best Screenplay	Lars von Trier, Niels Vørsel	Won	
12th Robert Awards	Best Cinematography	Eric Kress	Won	
12th Robert Awards	Best Score	Joachim Holbek	Won	
12th Robert Awards	Best Sound Design	Per Streit	Won	
Seattle International Film Festival	Golden Space Needle Award for Best Film	Riget	Won	
1996 Adolf Grimme Awards	Series/Miniseries	Lars von Trier	Won	
1996 Golden Cable Awards	Bronze Cable for Innovation	Lars von Trier	Won	
1996 Bodil Awards	Best Actor	Holger Juul Hansen	Won	
1996 Bodil Awards	Best Supporting Actress	Birgitte Raaberg	Won	
1999 Fantasporto	Best Screenplay	Lars von Trier, Morten Arnfred	Won	
1999 Fantasporto	Best Director	Lars von Trier	Won	
40th Robert Awards	Best TV Series	Lars von Trier, Niels Vørsel, and Louise Vesth (producer)	Nominated	
40th Robert Awards	Best Actor in a Leading Role - TV series	Mikael Persbrandt	Nominated	
40th Robert Awards	Best Actress in a Leading Role - TV series	Bodil Jørgensen	Nominated	
40th Robert Awards	Best Supporting Actor in a Leading Role - TV series	Lars Mikkelsen	Nominated	
40th Robert Awards	Best Supporting Actress in a Leading Role - TV series	Tuva Novotny	Nominated	

== American adaptation ==
Horror novelist Stephen King discovered the five-hour theatrical edit of Riget in a video store during production of the 1997 TV miniseries adaptation of The Shining, and, finding it "both funny and scary", promptly set out to obtain the rights to the series for an American adaptation. At that time, the rights were owned by Columbia Pictures, who had intended to adapt the series as a two-hour theatrical film. King negotiated with Columbia for the rights, ultimately exchanging them for the option to his novella "Secret Window, Secret Garden" (which Columbia adapted in 2004 as the feature film Secret Window).

King's thirteen episode television adaptation, titled Kingdom Hospital, broadcast between March and July 2004 on ABC. Often directly adapting storylines from the original series, Kingdom Hospital was set in a hospital in Lewiston, Maine, which was on the site of a mill built before the Civil War. Many character names were derived from their Danish equivalents, e.g., Sigrid Drusse became Sally Druse and Stig Helmer became Dr. Stegman. In a departure from the plot of Riget, the American series introduces a new protagonist, a comatose patient, Peter Rickman, inspired by King's own experience of being hit by a minivan, and a talking giant anteater, the spirit guide Anubis/Antubis.

Although King and co-writer Richard Dooling developed an outline for a second series, ratings dropped throughout the season. Kingdom Hospital was placed on indefinite hiatus following a "major network shake-up", and was never picked up for a second series.

== See also ==
- List of ghost films
