= A Horrible Woman =

2017 film by Christian Tafdrup

- Danish: En frygtelig kvinde
- Directed by: Christian Tafdrup
- Written by: Christian Tafdrup; Mads Tafdrup
- Produced by: Thomas Heinesen
- Starring: Anders Juul; Amanda Collin; Rasmus Hammerich; Nicolai Jandorf; Carla Mickelborg
- Cinematography: Niels Buchholzer
- Edited by: Nicholas Monberg
- Music by: Sune Kølster
- Production companies: New Danish Screen; Nordisk Film
- Distributed by: Cinema Mondo; Subtitle Distribution
- Release date: 27 December 2017
- Running time: 86 minutes
- Country: Denmark
- Language: Danish

A Horrible Woman (Danish: En frygtelig kvinde) is a Danish drama film from 2017, directed by Christian Tafdrup. It was made for less than 4 million kroner and was filmed in 16 days.

A Horrible Woman premiered at CPH:PIX in October 2017. The film had its Danish premier in December 2017. selling 21,000 tickets in the first 4 days. By mid-January, A Horrible Woman had sold over 100,000 tickets.

A Horrible Woman had a controversial reception, with some female reviewers arguing its depiction of women in relationships did more harm than good. That "(Marie) goes beyond her caricatured villain to say something more general about women's allegedly deceptive nature".

== Plot ==
Immature and naive bachelor Rasmus meets the sophisticated Marie, thinking he has met the love of his life. Marie moves in with Rasmus and begins to exert control over his life, manipulating him into redecorating the apartment, selling his CDs and writing his schedule on the kitchen whiteboard for her to see. On rare occasions when Rasmus tries to push back, Marie gaslights him and gets her own way.

While at a museum, Marie criticises Rasmus' passive and compliant nature, causing him to lose his temper and storm off. Immediately afterwards, he sees Marie outside, talking flirtatiously with Jonathan, her former classmate. Jonathan invites them to an art exhibition later that evening with other former classmates, to which Marie accepts. Rasmus initially feels out of place at the exhibition but soon builds rapport with Jonathan, which visibly annoys Marie as the two men laugh and joke together. She abruptly leaves, and when the couple return home, Marie harshly insults various aspects of Rasmus' personality, saying that it would be better if he became a completely different person.

Months later, Rasmus is living alone again having restored his apartment to its previous state. He is about to book a flight for a year-long trip to Argentina, when Marie arrives at the apartment under the guise of collecting a painting. She tells Rasmus she misses him and breaks down in tears. Rasmus also breaks down and the two kiss. For the second time in the film, Marie breaks the fourth wall and gives a sly, knowing grin to the audience.

Further into the future, Marie is heavily pregnant and her friends throw her a baby shower at the couple's apartment. Marie's decorations are back in place and she resumes bossing around a deflated Rasmus. He briefly steps outside of the apartment and screams to himself, before re-entering the party.

== Cast ==
- Anders Juul as Rasmus
- Amanda Collin as Marie
- Rasmus Hammerich as Troels
- Nicolai Jandorf as Lars
- Carla Mickelborg as Pernille
- Frederik Carlsen
