= Ulrik Bolt Jørgensen =

Danish film and television producer

Ulrik Bolt Jørgensen (born 1964) is a Danish film and television producer, and since 1992 founder and CEO of Arena Film (DK). From 2003–2016 he served as Film Commissioner of Copenhagen and was one of the driving forces behind the establishment of the Copenhagen Film Fund. Bolt Jørgensen is developing and producing international TV-series with a strong Scandinavian spine, as well as feature films. As a film commissioner, Bolt Jørgensen was involved in Tom Hooper's The Danish Girl, Wallander, starring Kenneth Branagh and Sommerdahl Murders.

== Career ==
Ulrik Bolt Jørgensen graduated from the National Film School of Denmark as a Creative Producer in 1991 and established his own production company 'Arena Film' in 1992, from where he produced film with director Lars Hesselholdt a.o. He later created the company 'Angel Arena' together with IT entrepreneur Mogens Glad, aimed at developing, producing and distributing major Scandinavian films and TV series, such as Falkehjerte (1999) starring Fanny Bernth, Misery Harbour (1999) starring Nikolaj Coster-Waldau and Leïla (2001) by director Gabriel Axel.

In 2003, Ulrik Bolt Jørgensen was serving the organization Copenhagen Capacity as the head of the Film Commission in Copenhagen, aimed at attracting foreign film and television series to the Greater Copenhagen area. While being Film Commissioner, Bolt Jørgensen was involved in the movie The Danish Girl (2015), and the television series Wallander (2008–2016) starring Kenneth Branagh and Midsomer Murders (1997–present), which shot their 100th episode in Copenhagen. Additionally, during his time as Film Commissioner, Bolt Jørgensen was a part of the establishment of the Copenhagen Film Fund.

In 2016, Ulrik Bolt Jørgensen re-established his production company Arena Film ApS situated in the Greater Copenhagen area, focusing on bringing Scandinavian stories to a global market.

== Filmography ==
Year	Title	Role	Notes
1990	The Gas Container	Producer	Danish Eksperimental Film by Wido Schlichting
1991	Frank og hans Piger	Producer	Danish Short Fiction Film by Klaus Kjeldsen
1991	Y Som Yrsa	Producer	Danish Short Fiction Film by Kari Vidø
1993	Cykellandet	Producer	Danish Television Series
1994	Troels Kløvedal og Nordkaperen i det Indiske Ocean	Producer, director	Theatrical Release and Documentary Television Series under the title "Nordkaperen i det Indiske Ocean"
1996	Ølaben	Producer	Danish Short Fiction Film by Helle Ryslinge
1996	Belma	Producer	Feature Film by Lars Hesselholdt
1998	Henning the Hero	Producer	Short Fiction by Lars Hesselholdt
1999	Katja's Adventure	Producer	Feature Film by Lars Hesselholdt
1999	Misery Harbour	Producer	Feature Film by Nils Gaup
2001	Another Blue Day	Producer	Short Fiction by Anne Heeno
2001	Leïla	Producer	Feature Film by Gabriel Axel
2018 -	M.A.D.	Producer, Co-creator	Television Drama
2018 -	The Brothers Nobel	Producer, Co-creator	Television Drama
