= At Night (2007 film) =

- Poster
- Directed by: Christian E. Christiansen
- Written by: Christian E. Christiansen
- Produced by: Louise Vesth
- Starring: Julie Ølgaard; Laura Christensen; Neel Rønholt; Henrik Prip
- Cinematography: Ian Hansen
- Edited by: Bodil Kjærhauge
- Music by: Mikkel Maltha
- Production company: Zentropa Entertainments
- Distributed by: Zentropa Entertainments; Magnolia Pictures
- Release date: February 19, 2007
- Running time: 39 minutes
- Country: Denmark
- Language: Danish
- Budget: kr2,400,000

At Night (original title: Om natten) is a 2007 Danish short film. It was nominated for Best Live Action Short Film at the 2008 Oscars.

== Plot ==
Three young women between the ages of 18 and 20 have been diagnosed with cancer. In the days between Christmas and New Year, the three girls manage to deal positively with the situation thanks to the company of one another.

== Cast ==
- Julie Ølgaard as Stephanie
- Laura Christensen as Sara
- Neel Rønholt as Mette
- Henrik Prip as Torben

== Awards and nominations ==
Academy Awards

- 2008: Nominated, "Best Short Film, Live Action"
