= Kurt Ravn =

Danish singer and actor (born 1947)

- Born: 29 December 1947 (age 78); Kolding, Denmark
- Occupations: Singer; Actor
- Years active: 1979-present

Kurt Ravn (born 29 December 1947) is a Danish singer and actor. He is best known for his performance in the TV series Matador and Anna Pihl.

== Selected filmography ==
Film
Year	Title	Role	Notes
1979	Johnny Larsen		
1981	Jeppe på bjerget	Erik Lakaj	
1988	Katinka		
2006	We Shall Overcome		
2006	The Lost Treasure of the Knights Templar	Erik Isaksen	
2007	Cecilie		
2010	Eksperimentet		
2011	All for One		
2013	All for Two		
2013	The Olsen Gang in Deep Trouble		voice only
2014	Speed Walking		
2018	Up and Away		voice only

TV
Year	Title	Role	Notes
1978-1982	Matador	Lauritz "Red" Jensen	
2006-2008	Anna Pihl	Henning Pihl	
2009	The Killing	Gert Grue Eriksen	
2017	Rita		
