= Amanda Collin =

Danish actress (born 1986)

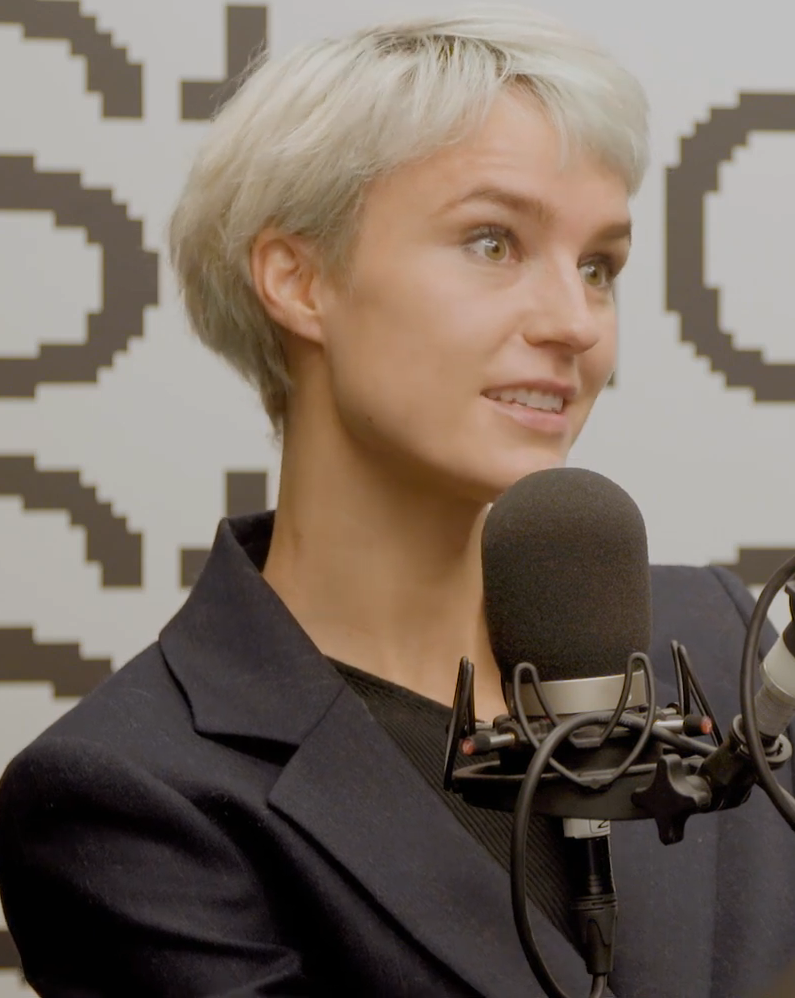
- Collin in 2020
- Born: 4 March 1986 (age 40); Rungsted, Hørsholm, Denmark
- Occupation: Actress
- Years active: 2011–present

Amanda Collin (born 4 March 1986), also known as Amanda Bjerre-Petersen, is a Danish actress. She is known for A Terrible Woman (2017), Department Q: A Conspiracy of Faith (2016), Splitting Up Together (2016), Raised by Wolves (2020–2022), and House of the Dragon (2024–present).

== Early life and education ==
Amanda Collin (aka Amanda Bjerre-Petersen) was born on 4 March 1986 in Rungsted, Hørsholm, Denmark.

She trained in the Meisner technique at the William Esper Studio in New York City from 2009 to 2011.

== Career ==
From 2015 to 2016, Collin was part of the Mungo Park Theatre ensemble, where she played in Hans Christian Andersen's fairytales, Boys Don't Cry and Hamlet. In 2017, Collin was nominated for the Danish equivalent of the Academy Award, the Robert Award, for her supporting role of Rakel, the religious mother of two kidnapped children in the Danish box office hit Department Q: A Conspiracy of Faith directed by Hans Petter Moland.

Collin played the leading role of Marie in the film A Terrible Woman, and won both the Robert Award and the Bodil Award for Best Actress in a Leading Role in 2018.

In 2019, Collin appeared in Daniel Borgman's Resin, for which she was nominated for a Robert Award for Best Actress in a Supporting Role.

In 2020, she starred in Aaron Guzikowski's sci-fi drama series Raised by Wolves from HBO Max.

In 2023, she had a leading role in The Promised Land.

In 2025, she plays Katja Claussen, a government minister, in the crime drama television series Smilla's Sense of Snow, an international co-production created and directed by British director Amma Asante.

== Filmography ==
=== Film ===
| Year | Title | Role | Notes |
|---|---|---|---|
| 2011 | Pretty Vacant | Model | Short film |
| 2012 | Alleged | Svetlana | Short film |
| 2012 | Bag Glas | Anemone | Short film |
| 2014 | For det fælles bedste | Johanne | Short film |
| 2014 | Ækte vare | Line | First feature film |
| 2014 | Lukkede Øjne | Woman | Short film |
| 2015 | Mod toppen af bjerget | Rebecca | Short film |
| 2016 | Department Q: A Conspiracy of Faith | Rakel | |
| 2016 | In the Dark Room | Olga | |
| 2017 | Darkland | Amanda | |
| 2017 | En frygtelig kvinde | Marie | |
| 2019 | Resin | Roald | |
| 2019 | The Exception (Undtagelsen) | Malene | Based on the 2004 novel by Christian Jungersen; directed by Jesper W. Nielsen |
| 2022 | Fædre & mødre | Julie | |
| 2023 | The Promised Land | Ann Barbara | |
| 2024 | The Quiet Ones | Maria | |
| 2025 | The Woman in Cabin 10 | Nilssen | |

=== Television ===
| Year | Title | Role | Notes |
|---|---|---|---|
| 2013–2017 | Sjit Happens | Lærke / Amanda | 9 episodes |
| 2014–2015 | Banken: New Normal | Rikke | 5 episodes |
| 2015 | Klaes the Roommate | Caroline | Episode: Har du bollet |
| 2016 | Splitting Up Together | Charlotte | 4 episodes |
| 2016 | Ditte & Louise | Ekspedient | Episode: Skoene med tæerne |
| 2017 | Flashback | Girl with hairbow | Episode: Lina Rafn, Simon Emil Ammitzbøll, Joakim Ingversen |
| 2017 | Something's Rockin' | Regitze | 2 episodes |
| 2018 | Tæt på sandheden med Jonathan Spang | Marie | 2 episodes |
| 2018 | Theo & Den Magiske Talisman | Oraklet | 24 episodes |
| 2020–2022 | Raised by Wolves | Mother / Lamia | 18 episodes |
| 2024–present | House of the Dragon | Lady Jeyne Arryn | 7 episodes |
| 2024 | Chaos | Viktoria | 8 episodes |
| 2025 | Smilla's Sense of Snow | Katja Claussen | Based on Peter Høeg's 1992 novel Miss Smilla's Feeling for Snow |

=== Music videos ===
| Year | Title | Role | Notes |
|---|---|---|---|
| 2016 | "You're Not There" | Girl with apples | Lukas Graham song |
