= Birgitte Raaberg =

Danish actress

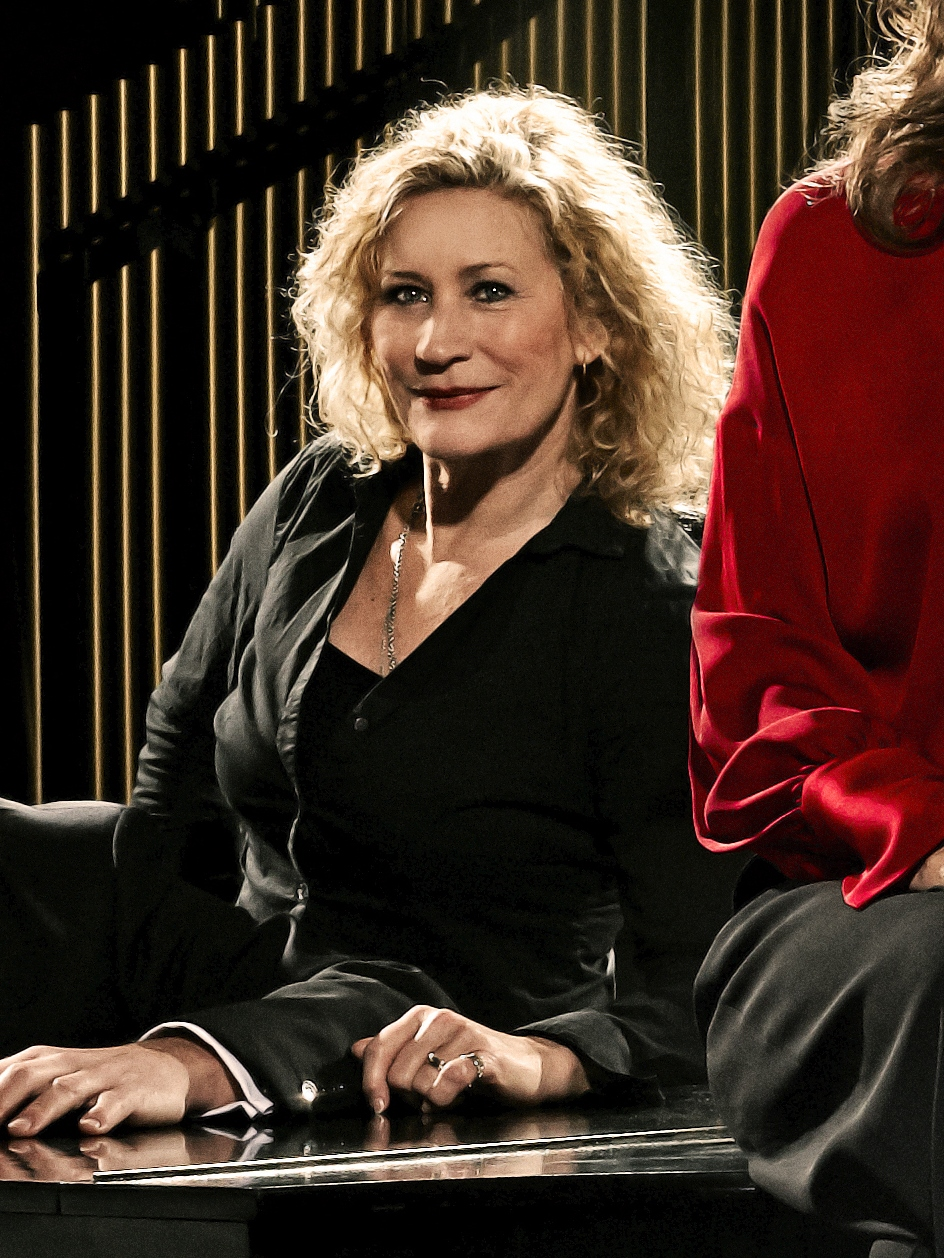
- Brigitte Raaberg, 2017
- Born: Frederiksberg, Denmark
- Citizenship: Danish
- Website: https://birgitte-raaberg.dk

Birgitte Raaberg is a Danish actress who played Judith Petersen in The Kingdom by Lars von Trier.
