= Truth About Men =

2010 Danish comedy drama film

Trught About Men
- Film poster
- Swahili: Sandheden om mænd
- Directed by: Nikolaj Arcel
- Written by: Nikolaj Arcel; Rasmus Heisterberg; Lars Kaalund; Per Nielsen (storyline consultant)
- Produced by: Meta Louise Foldager Sørensen; Louise Vesth
- Starring: Thure Lindhardt; Tuva Novotny
- Cinematography: Rasmus Videbæk
- Edited by: Mikkel E.G. Nielsen; Andri Steinn
- Music by: Asger Baden; Steen Holbek; Flemming Nordkrog
- Production companies: Film i Väst; Zentropa Entertainments
- Distributed by: Scanbox Entertainment
- Release date: 7 October 2010 (Denmark)
- Running time: 91 minutes
- Country: Denmark
- Language: Danish

Truth About Men (Danish: Sandheden om mænd) is a 2010 Danish comedy drama film directed by Nikolaj Arcel.

== Cast ==
- Thure Lindhardt as Mads
- Tuva Novotny as Marie
- Rosalinde Mynster as Julie
- Signe Egholm Olsen as Louise
