= Julie Ølgaard =

Danish actress

Julie R. Ølgaard (born 29 September 1981) is a Danish actress.

== Career ==
In 2000, Ølgaard relocated to Los Angeles, where she trained as an actress at the Lee Strasberg Theatre and Film Institute. After three years, she returned home and had a short career as radio host at Danmarks Radio. Her breakthrough into film came with the 2003 thriller Midsommer.

Ølgaard may be best known for her role as Nanna Birk Larsen, the murder victim in the Danish 2007 television series The Killing.

== Private life ==
In an April 2012 interview, Ølgaard admitted that she can be quite spontaneous, and had once been married in a ceremony performed in Las Vegas, though she did not provide particulars other than "I'd rather regret the things I do than regret the things I didn't do." In a November 2012 interview, she revealed that the marriage had been to L.O.C., a Danish rapper.

Ølgaard was close friends with Danish actress Mira Wanting, who was 34 when she died of cervical cancer in December 2012; the two friends had appeared together in the 2007 horror film Room 205.

Ølgaard has been married to former professional skier Gustav Muus since 2015, and together they have son Cooper (b. 2017) and daughter Roxy (b. 2019).

== Selected filmography ==
- Midsommer (2003)
- Råzone (2006)
- At Night (Om natten, 2007)
- Room 205 (Kollegiet, 2007)
- The Killing (Forbrydelsen, 2007)
- A Viking Saga (2008)
- Himmerland (2008)
- Crying for Love (Dig og Mig, 2008)
- Julefrokosten (2009)
- Headhunters (Hodejegerne, 2011)
