= Misery Harbour =

1999 Norwegian drama film directed by Nils Gaup

- movie poster
- Directed by: Nils Gaup
- Screenplay by: Sigve Endresen; Kenny Sanders
- Based on: novel by Aksel Sandemose
- Produced by: Sigve Endresen; Ulrik Bolt Jørgensen
- Starring: Nikolaj Coster-Waldau; Stuart Graham; Anneke von der Lippe; Graham Greene
- Cinematography: Erling Thurmann-Andersen
- Edited by: Barrie Vince
- Music by: Joachim Holbek
- Production companies: Angel Films; Arena Film
- Release date: September 3, 1999
- Running time: 100 minutes
- Country: Norway
- Language: Norwegian

Misery Harbour is a 1999 Norwegian drama film directed by Nils Gaup.

The film received reviews with "die throw" scores of 5 in VG, and Dagbladet; 4 in Adresseavisen and in Bergensavisen.

== Plot ==
A young writer named Espen Arnakke tells the story of his escape from the small Danish town of Jante. Espen boards a ship headed to Newfoundland, but the harsh conditions on board makes him jump ship, and he ends up in the little town of Misery Harbour. There he meets the girl of his dreams. But his passion shifts to jealousy when one of the men from the ship mysteriously appears in town, and sets out to make Espen's life a misery.

== Cast ==
- Nikolaj Coster-Waldau as Espen Arnakke
- Stuart Graham as John Wakefield
- Anneke von der Lippe as Jenny
- Graham Greene as Burly
- Bjørn Floberg as Johan Hoeg
- Hywel Bennett as The Captain
- Sturla Berg-Johansen as Waiter
- Stig Hoffmeyer as Wilhelm Arnakke
