= Life Hits =

2006 Danish drama film

- Danish: Råzone
- Directed by: Christian E. Christiansen
- Written by: Christian E. Christiansen; Morten Dragsted; Jesper N. Christiansen
- Produced by: Louise Vesth
- Starring: Laura Christensen; Stephanie Leon
- Cinematography: Ian Hansen
- Edited by: Bodil Kjærhauge
- Release date: 7 July 2006
- Running time: 93 minutes
- Country: Denmark
- Language: Danish

Life Hits (Danish: Råzone) is a 2006 Danish drama film directed by Christian E. Christiansen, starring Laura Christensen, Stephanie Leon, Julie Ølgaard, and Sara Møller Olsen. The film follows four close friends navigating the challenges of school life, partying, relationships, and bullying.

== Cast ==
- Laura Christensen as Christina
- Stephanie Leon as Cecilie
- Julie Ølgaard as Trine
- Sara Møller Olsen as Pernille
- Mette Riber Christoffersen as Anja
- Cyron Melville as Nikolaj
- Murad Mahmoud as Shaid
