= Annevig Schelde Ebbe =

Danish actress

- Born: August 6, 1983 (age 42); Aarhus, Denmark
- Occupations: Actress, voice actress
- Years active: 1993–present

Annevig Schelde Ebbe (born August 6, 1983) is a Danish actress and voice actress from Aarhus, Denmark.

She contributes to acting Danish language dubbing. She dubs characters from cartoons, movies, anime, and more. She also played Mary Jensen in the DR 1 miniseries The Kingdom. She dubs Stacy Hirano, Vanessa Doofensmirtz, and other characters from Phineas and Ferb. She is the current Danish dubber of May, and Dawn from Pokémon.

== Filmography ==
=== Dubbing ===
- Mindy in Animaniacs
- Bloom in Winx Club
- Mac in Foster's Home for Imaginary Friends
- Clover in Totally Spies
- Taylor Mckessie in High School Musical
- Runo and other characters in Bakugan Battle Brawlers
- Hikari Uchiha in Naruto
- Brandy in Brandy & Mr. Whiskers
- Rainbow Dash in My Little Pony: Friendship is Magic and My Little Pony: Equestria Girls
- Stacy Hirano, Vanessa Doofensmirtz and other characters in Phineas and Ferb
- Patzy in Camp Lazlo
- Dawn, May, and other characters in Pokémon
- Sabrina Spellman in Sabrina: The Animated Series
- Sarah and May Kanker in Ed, Edd n Eddy
- Kitty in Kitty Is Not a Cat

=== Acting ===
- Mary Jensen in The Kingdom
- and others

== See also ==
- The Kingdom
- SDI Media Denmark
