= Carsten Bjørnlund =

Danish actor (born 1973)

- Bjørnlund in 2026
- Born: 28 June 1973 (age 53); Frederiksberg, Denmark
- Occupation: Actor
- Years active: 2000–present
- Spouse: Christie Fals (m. 2015)
- Children: 3

Carsten Bjørnlund (born 28 June 1973) is a Danish theatre, film, and television actor.

Bjørnlund's first leading film role was Rasmus in 2008's Oneway-Ticket to Korsør. He played one of the leading characters in the second series of Forbrydelsen (The Killing). Among his film roles are Karl in The Thing (2011) and Martin in ID:A (2011). He also played the male character in the 2012 music video for "The Fall" by Rhye.

From 2012 to 2015, he played the character Rasmus in TV2's comedy-drama "Rita". The show returned in 2020, featuring Carsten Bjørnlund.

From 2014 to 2017, he played one of the lead roles in the drama Arvingerne (The Legacy).

Bjørnlund married Danish actress Signe Skov in 2004, with whom he had two sons (Bertram Bjørnlund and Vilfred Bjørnlund). They divorced in 2011. He began dating designer Christie Fals, with whom he had a daughter, Ziggy Bjørnlund, at the beginning of October 2016.

== Filmography ==
Year	Title	Role	Notes
2003	The Inheritance	Henrik Jansson	
2004	Lad de små børn...	Ulrik	
2005	Den rette ånd	Johnny Rasmussen	
2008	Comeback	Jakob	
2008	En enkelt til Korsør	Rasmus	
2010	Nothing's All Bad	Kunde hos prostitueret / prostitute's Customer	
2011	Labrador	Oskar	
2011	The Thing	Karl	
2011	ID A	Martin	
2013	The Shooter	Adam Larsen	
2014	All Inclusive	Anders	
2017	QEDA	Fang Rung / Gordon Thomas	
2018	O affair	Hasse Lønstrup	
2022–2023	DNA	Frank Krøjer Jensen	
2023	Barracuda Queens	Lars Millkvist	
2026	Woman Unknown	Christian	
