= All for One (2011 film) =

2011 film

- Film poster
- Directed by: Rasmus Heide
- Written by: Mick Øgendahl
- Produced by: Ronnie Fridthjof
- Starring: Mick Øgendahl; Jonatan Spang; Jon Lange; Rasmus Bjerg
- Cinematography: Philippe Kress
- Distributed by: Nordisk Film
- Release date: 10 February 2011
- Running time: 81 minutes
- Country: Denmark
- Language: Danish

All for One (Danish: Alle for én) is a 2011 Danish comedy film directed by Rasmus Heide. In 2013 it was followed by All for Two.

== Cast ==
- Jon Lange as Martin
- Jonatan Spang as Nikolai
- Rasmus Bjerg as Timo
- Mick Øgendahl as Ralf
- Lisa Werlinder as Sofie
- Charlotte Fich as Line
- Gordon Kennedy as Toke
- Signe Anastassia Mannov as Helle (as Signe A. Mannov)
- Kurt Ravn as Arno
- Mille Dinesen as Niemeyer's Wife
- Rutger Hauer as Niemeyer
- Søren Malling as Revisor
