= Speak No Evil (2022 film) =

2022 film by Christian Tafdrup

- Theatrical release poster
- Danish: Gæsterne
- Literally: The Guests
- Directed by: Christian Tafdrup
- Written by: Christian Tafdrup; Mads Tafdrup
- Produced by: Jacob Jarek
- Starring: Morten Burian; Sidsel Siem Koch; Fedja van Huêt; Karina Smulders; Liva Forsberg; Marius Damslev
- Cinematography: Erik Molberg Hansen
- Edited by: Nicolaj Monberg
- Music by: Sune "Køter" Kølster
- Production companies: Profile Pictures; Oak Motion Pictures
- Distributed by: Nordisk Film (Denmark); September Film (Netherlands)
- Release dates: 22 January 2022 (Sundance); 17 March 2022 (Denmark); 21 July 2022 (Netherlands)
- Running time: 98 minutes
- Countries: Denmark; Netherlands
- Languages: English; Danish; Dutch
- Budget: €2.8 million; (est. $3.1 million)
- Box office: $377,060

Speak No Evil (Danish: Gæsterne, lit. 'The Guests') is a 2022 psychological horror thriller film directed by Christian Tafdrup from a screenplay he co-wrote with his brother Mads. It is produced by Jacob Jarek and is distributed by Nordisk Film. Filming took place in Denmark, the Netherlands, and Italy, and most of the film is shot in English, with some scenes in Danish and Dutch. The film centers on Bjørn (Morten Burian) and Louise (Sidsel Siem Koch), a Danish couple who are invited by Patrick (Fedja van Huêt) and Karin (Karina Smulders), a Dutch couple, to their country house for a weekend holiday; the hosts soon test the limits of their guests as a tense situation escalates.

Speak No Evil premiered in the Midnight section at the 38th Sundance Film Festival on 22 January 2022. It was theatrically released in Denmark on 17 March 2022 and in the Netherlands on 21 July. The film grossed $377,060 worldwide and was acclaimed for its directing and performances of the cast by critics, who also praised the film's supple social commentary, tone and suspense.

An American remake produced by Blumhouse Productions was released on 13 September 2024.

== Plot ==
During their vacation in Tuscany, Italy, Bjørn and Louise, a Danish couple, and their daughter Agnes, meet Patrick and Karin, a Dutch couple, and their son Abel, with whom they spend a pleasant evening at dinner. Bjørn and Louise receive an invitation from the Dutch couple to visit their remote rural house in the Netherlands. During the first two days, Louise feels uncomfortable about the hosts' passive-aggressive behaviour, such as the disdainful way they treat Abel, who they explain was born with no tongue.

Her concerns are exacerbated when they are invited out for dinner, unaware that the children were to be left at home accompanied by an unknown babysitter called Muhajid. At dinner, Patrick challenges Louise's vegetarianism after ordering multiple meals containing meat, then drunkenly makes out with his wife in front of them. After manipulating Bjørn into paying for the dinner, Patrick drives drunk and blasts loud music, upsetting Louise. He also enters the bathroom while she is taking a shower, and later observes the couple having sex. When Agnes's calls to sleep next to her parents are ignored, Patrick takes her. Louise finds Agnes sleeping next to a naked Patrick, causing the family to leave, only to turn back after Agnes realizes that her rabbit doll Ninus is missing. Back at the house, they are convinced to stay longer. Later, the couple discovers that Patrick lied about being a doctor to impress them and is actually unemployed, as he does not believe in actual work. After dinner, the couples argue over Patrick's abuse of Abel after Patrick throws a mug at him.

That night, Bjørn discovers a cabin behind the house, and finds empty luggage and cameras inside. The cabin's walls are covered with photographs of Patrick and Karin with other couples with young children on holidays. The pictures suggest the Dutch couple are serial killers with a pattern of deceiving families in order to murder them and abduct their children. Bjørn and his family are the next victims. Bjørn then finds Abel's body drowned in the pool. They escape, but Bjørn does not tell his wife about his discovery.

After their car breaks down, Bjørn searches for help but returns to find his family inside Patrick's car. Patrick had been tailing the family after hearing their car horn while departing their home and thanks Bjørn "for the call". Bjørn plays along in order to attempt to keep the situation calm, but it still escalates quickly. Patrick beats Bjørn; Abel's babysitter Muhajid holds down Louise while Karin cuts off Agnes's tongue with scissors, much to Bjørn's shock and Louise's devastation. Muhajid leaves with Agnes as her traumatized parents are taken to a deserted road.

When the Danish couple are brought out of the car, Bjørn asks them why they are doing this, to which Patrick replies "Because you let me.", making Bjørn and Louise realize they've played right into their hands. Bjørn and Louise are then forced to take off their clothes and go naked into a ditch at the same quarry Bjørn visited with Patrick, where they are brutally stoned to death, but not before Bjørn embraces Louise one last time as he tearfully apologizes. Some time later, a now mute Agnes now plays the role of Patrick and Karin's daughter as the couple targets another family for their next murder.

== Cast ==
- Morten Burian as Bjørn
- Sidsel Siem Koch as Louise
- Fedja van Huêt as Patrick
- Karina Smulders as Karin
- Liva Forsberg as Agnes
- Marius Damslev as Abel
- Hichem Yacoubi as Muhajid

== Production ==
Speak No Evil is the third feature film by Christian Tafdrup, who is mostly active as an actor, and his first genre film, in which he tries to combine the drama genre with social commentary and psychological horror elements. He co-wrote the screenplay with his brother Mads Tafdrup. Jacob Jarek acted as producer, with the production costs estimated to be €2.8 million. Filming had to be temporarily interrupted in Denmark and the Netherlands due to the COVID-19 pandemic. It was mostly filmed in English, and further shooting took place in the Netherlands and Italy.

The project was presented at the Nordic Film Market as part of the Gothenburg Film Festival before it was completed in January 2021 and was strongly courted by distributors. The film rights were subsequently sold to Australia and New Zealand, the Benelux countries, Russia and the Commonwealth of Independent States, and Hungary.

== Release ==
The film received an invitation to the Midnight section of the 38th Sundance Film Festival, which included: "horror and comedy works that defy genre classification", where it premiered on 22 January 2022. The film was theatrically released in Denmark on 17 March 2022 by Nordisk Film and in the Netherlands on 21 July by September Film. It was released in the United States in select theaters on 9 September 2022 and through video on demand on 15 September 2022 by Shudder and IFC Films.

== Reception ==
On the review aggregator website Rotten Tomatoes, 84% of 101 critics' reviews are positive, with an average rating of 7.5/10. The website's consensus reads: "A social satire with razor-sharp teeth, Speak No Evil offers a darkly delicious treat for fans of misanthropic thrillers." Metacritic, which uses a weighted average, assigned the film a score of 78 out of 100, based on 17 critics, indicating "generally favorable" reviews. Sundance Film Festival touted the film as a "brilliantly provocative and simmering satirical work of horror [that] incriminates both sides".

Reviewing the film for IndieWire, Susannah Gruder praised the acting performances (especially Morten Burian's) and gave it a grade of "A" on an "A+" to "F" scale, and called it "the most cunningly depraved horror film in years" and "a piercing commentary on the ways we accommodate others to the point of self-subjugation". Praising Tafdrup's direction, The New York Times critic Jeannette Catsoulis called it "an icy satire of middle-class mores [that glides] inexorably from squirmy to sinister to full-on shocking [and] is utterly fearless in its mission to unsettle".

Most reviewers interpreted the main message of the film as the danger of doing nothing in the face of evil, in the name of 'not causing offence'. One reviewer in particular noted that sometimes, "peace is another term for surrender", and if good decent people wish to live in a good and decent world, then sometimes they will have to fight for it.

=== Accolades ===
Award	Date of ceremony	Category	Recipient(s)	Result	Ref(s)
Ostend Film Festival	4–12 March 2022	Best Coproduction	Speak No Evil	Nominated	
Seattle International Film Festival	14–24 April 2022	Best Film	Speak No Evil	Nominated	
Chicago Film Critics Association	13–19 May 2022	Narrative Feature	Speak No Evil	Nominated	
Filmfest München	22 June–2 July 2022	Best Film by an Emerging Director	Christian Tafdrup	Nominated	
Bucheon International Fantastic Film Festival	7–17 July 2022	Best Director Choice	Christian Tafdrup	Won	
MOTELx – Festival Internacional de Cinema de Terror de Lisboa	6–12 September 2022	Best European Feature Film	Speak No Evil	Won	
Sitges Film Festival	6–16 October 2022	Best Motion Picture	Speak No Evil	Nominated	

== Remake ==
In April 2023, it was announced Blumhouse Productions was developing a remake of the same name, with James McAvoy attached to star and James Watkins writing and directing. The film was theatrically released on 13 September 2024 by Universal Pictures.
