= Leïla (2001 film) =

2001 film by Gabriel Axel

- Directed by: Gabriel Axel
- Written by: Gabriel Axel; Bettina Howitz
- Produced by: Ulrik Bolt Jørgensen
- Starring: Mélanie Doutey
- Narrated by: Michel Bouquet
- Cinematography: Morten Bruus
- Edited by: Grete Møldrup
- Music by: Younès Mégri
- Distributed by: Angel Films
- Release date: 17 August 2001
- Running time: 90 minutes
- Country: Denmark
- Language: French

Leïla is a 2001 Danish film directed by Gabriel Axel.

== Plot ==
A young Danish guy, Nils, is visiting Morocco, where he meets the 16-year-old Berber girl Leïla. It marks the beginning of a great, all-encompassing passion. Leïla must defy her family to be with Nils, and their love has big consequences.

== Cast ==
- Mélanie Doutey as Leïla
- Arnaud Binard as Nils
- Malika El-Omari as Moona
- Azeddine Bouayad as Brahim
- Michel Bouquet - narrator
- Mitch Bateman as party goer
- Christian E. Christiansen as Nils' friend no. 2
- Mads Knarreborg as Nils' friend no. 1 (uncredited)

== Reception ==
The film was met with very negative reviews and was a box office bomb. Swedish film critic Gunnar Rehlin in Variety wrote "Pic feels tepid and devoid of emotional involvement. Due to the use of v.o., the two leads never get a real chance to convey their characters' emotions."
