= Jon Lange =

Danish actor (born 1980)

Jon Gudmand Lange (born March 28, 1980, in Søborg) is a Danish actor and voice actor. Jon Lange is the son of public school teachers Gerd Lange and Troels Gudmand Pedersen. He is the brother of television organizer Camille Lange. In 2013, he married Mette Marie Lei Lange, and in 2014 they welcomed twins. He is a graduate of The Acting School at Odense Theatre in 2011 and is quite a versatile actor.

== Filmography ==
- Midsommer (2003)
- Unge Andersen (2005)
- Allegro (2005)
- Den Sorte Madonna (2007)
- Room 205 (2007)
- I'll Come Running (2008)
- Broderskab (2010)
- Alle for en (2011)
- Sommeren '92 (2015)
- Domino (2019)
- Sygeplejeskolen (2020-2024)

== Dubbing ==
- Gravity Falls - Bill Cipher, Robbie, Manly Dan, Agent Powers
- Randy Cunningham: 9th Grade Ninja - Randy Cunningham
