= Midsommer =

2003 Danish/Swedish psychological horror film by Carsten Myllerup

- English: Midsummer
- Directed by: Carsten Myllerup
- Written by: Rasmus Heisterberg
- Produced by: Tomas Hostrup-Larsen; Rasmus Thorsen
- Starring: Kristian Leth; Laura Christensen; Jon Lange; Nicolai Jandorf; Tuva Novotny
- Edited by: Mogens Hagedorn Christiansen
- Music by: Søren Hyldgaard
- Production company: Cosmo Film
- Release date: 7 February 2003 (Denmark)
- Running time: 97 minutes
- Countries: Denmark; Sweden
- Language: Danish

Midsommer (English: Midsummer) is a 2003 psychological horror film directed by Carsten Myllerup and written by Rasmus Heisterberg. The story revolves around a group of Danish students who celebrate their graduation in a Swedish forest, when they encounter a supernatural presence seemingly connected to a friend who recently committed suicide. Six months after the film's release in 2003, the film rights were purchased by Bill Block for an American remake. The American version was reset to a Louisiana bayou and released in 2007 with the title Solstice.

== Cast ==
- Kristian Leth as Christian
- Laura Christensen as Trine
- Julie Ølgaard as Anja
- Nicolai Jandorf as Jannick
- Jon Lange as Mark
- Lykke Sand Michelsen as Sofie
- Tuva Novotny as Linn
- Per Oscarsson as Persson

== Reception ==
The film received generally positive reviews from the Danish press. The Berlingske Tidende awarded it 4 out of 6 stars, praising the films lighting, acting and effectiveness at providing surprising moments of fright, but criticized the rushed and confused quality of the film's latter half. The Politiken appreciated the filmmaker's success in elevating the film beyond the typical teen horror flick but found the abundance of mysterious happenings to be over-the-top.

== Awards and nominations ==
A song from the soundtrack, "Transparent and Glasslike" by Carpark North, won the award for Best Song at Denmark's 21st Robert Awards. The film also received both the Older Jury Award and Audience Award at the Leeds International Film Festival.
