= Times Have Been Better =

- Genre: Comedy
- Written by: Nicolas Mercier
- Directed by: Régis Musset
- Starring: Arnaud Binard; Bernard Le Coq; Charlotte de Turckheim
- Country of origin: France
- Original language: French

Production
- Producers: Patrick Benedek; Thomas Bourguignon
- Cinematography: Christophe Paturange
- Editor: Diane Logan
- Running time: 92 minutes
- Production company: BB Films

Original release
- Network: France 2
- Release: 24 October 2006

Times Have Been Better (French: Le Ciel sur la tête) is a French comedy television film, directed by Régis Musset and released in 2006. The film stars Arnaud Binard as Jérémy, a 30-year-old man who comes out as gay to his parents, only to have his parents Guy (Bernard Le Coq) and Rosine (Charlotte de Turckheim) react more negatively than expected.

The film's cast also includes Olivier Guéritée, Stéphane Boucher, Thierry Desroses, Pierre Deny and Chantal Ravalec.

The film was screened at selected LGBT film festivals beginning in 2006, before having its television premiere on France 2 in April 2007. It was rebroadcast by the network in 2010.

The film won the award for Best Foreign Narrative Feature at the 2007 New York Lesbian and Gay Film Festival.
