= Carole Brana =

French actress and model

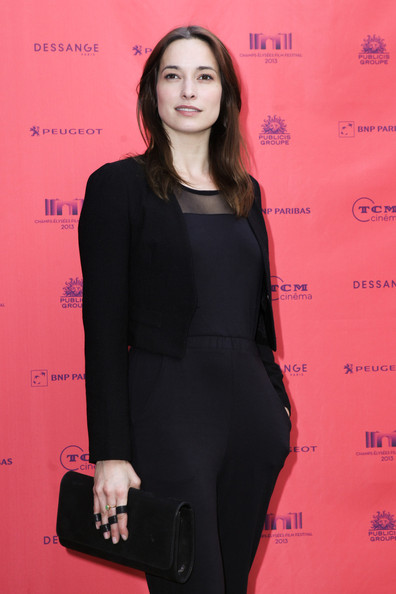
- Carole Brana in 2020
- Born: 1985 (age 40–41); Pyrenees Atlantiques, France
- Years active: 2008–present
- Website: http://www.carolebrana.com/

Carole Brana is a French actress and model of Czech and Spanish descent.

== Early life ==
After finishing high school Carole Brana earned a two-years BTS ( Higher National Diploma ) in Bayonne, France with the ambition to become a Director of Photography. She was then discovered by the modelling industry and joined Karin. She has modelled for large cosmetic brands like Chanel, Lancôme, L'Oreal and Garnier.

She was offered roles in films and television. She can be seen in the Olivier Marchal movie Carbon with Gerard Depardieu and Laura Smet.

In 2020, she appeared with Dany Boon and Philippe Katerine in Le Lion directed by Ludovic Colbeau Justin.

In 2025, in Emily in Paris as Isabelle with Philippine Leroy-Beaulieu.

== Selected filmography ==
=== Cinéma ===
==== Features films ====
- 2009 : À l'aventure : Sandrine
- 2011 : Les Nuits rouges du Bourreau de Jade : Sandrine
- 2016 : Vape Wave de Jan Kounen : personnages du futur
- 2017 : Carbone : Dana Goldstein
- 2020 : Le Lion : Anna
- 2023 : La Vie pour de vrai de Dany Boon : Maman Violette

=== Télévision ===
- 2009 : Section de recherches : Maya
- 2009 : Femmes de loi : Marion Bompard
- 2011 : Enquêtes réservées : Angela Fournier
- 2012 : Autopsie d'un mariage blanc : Christine
- 2014 : La Loi de Barbara : Carole Valloux with Josiane Balasko
- 2016 : Duel au Soleil, saison 2 : Cécile, la voisine de Le Tallec
- 2019 : Commissaire Magellan, réalisé par Etienne Dhaene :
- 2019 : Alex Hugo - épisode Mémoire morte de Thierry Petit : Irène
- 2020 : Meurtres à la Pointe du Raz - Laurent Dussaux : Justine
- 2025 : Camping Paradis : Typhaine (saison 16, épisode 2)
- 2025 : Emily in Paris : Isabelle (saison 5, épisode 5)

==== Short métrages ====
- 2008 : La Poderosa : la Poderosa
- 2011 : Zombinladen : Julie
- 2013 : On/Off : Meredith
- 2013 : Being Homer Simpson : la policière
- 2014 : Replika : Amy by Luc Walpoth
- 2021 : Juste avant : Audrey

Music videos

- 2006 : La Poderosa d’Eden
- 2008 : We Be de Wax Tailor
- 2009 : La Peur de l’Echec d’Orelsan
- 2011 : C'est bon de The Supermen Lovers
- 2011 : En miettes d'Oshen
