= Jean Darnel =

French actor (1923–2020)

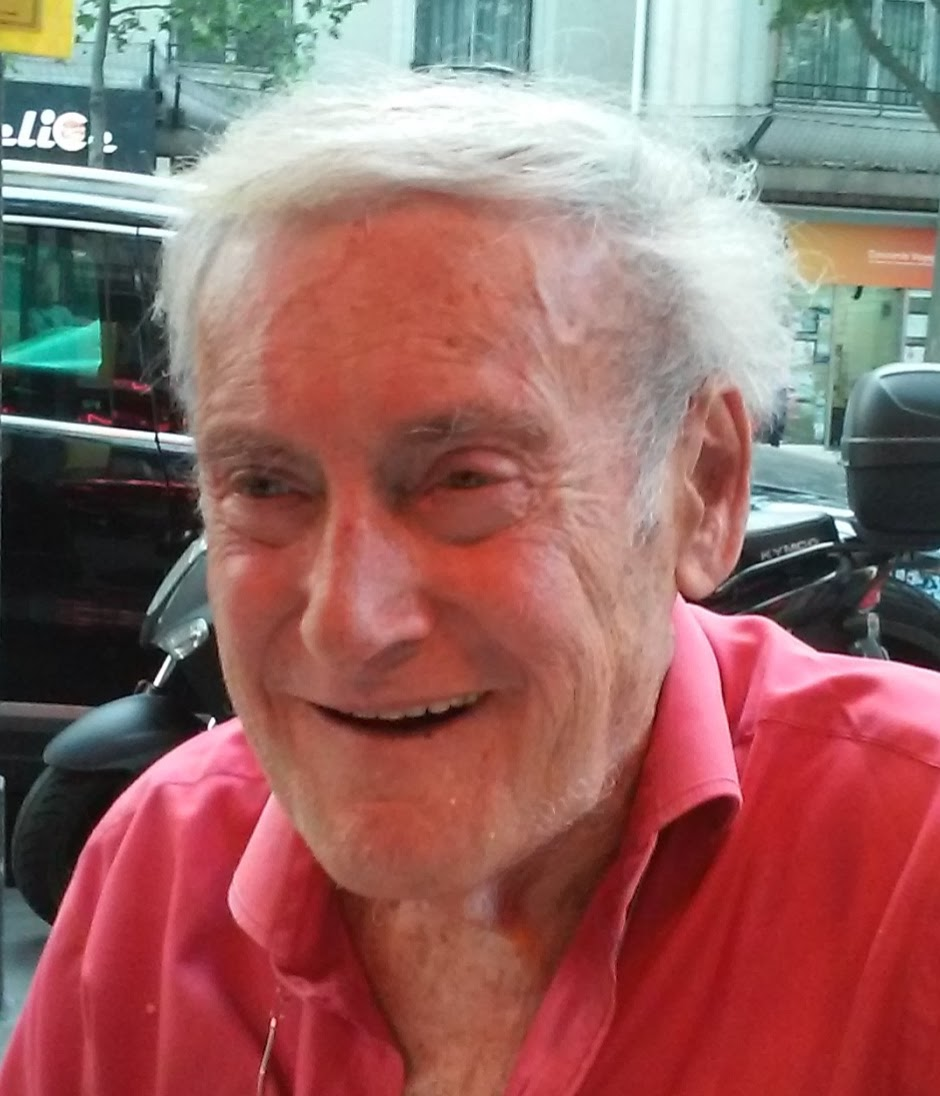
- Darnel in 2016
- Born: 1923; Bayonne, France
- Died: 20 November 2020 (aged 96–97); Paris, France
- Occupations: Actor; Director

Jean Darnel (1923 – 20 November 2020) was a French actor and director.

== Biography ==
Darnel grew up in the 1930s in Bayonne and Paris. Eager to become an actor, he introduced himself to Marcel Achard to ask him for advice. Achard directed him to the Théâtre des Mathurins, where he made his debut on 1 July 1942. In 1945, at the Théâtre du Châtelet, he performed in a stage production for orphans of World War II and the French Resistance.

Darnel created the new Chorégies d'Orange with Jacques Bourgeois in 1971. He also started the Festival de Nohant and the Musique en Côte Basque. In 1996, he started to host Libre journal du spectacle on Radio Courtoisie.

Jean Darnel died in Paris on 20 November 2020.

== Television ==
- Le Bourgeois gentilhomme (1970)

== Theatre ==
=== Actor ===
- L' Aiglon (1945)
- Pour le roi de Prusse (1954)
- César et Cléopâtre (1957)
- Hamlet (1959)
- Ruy Blas (1961)

=== Director ===
- Hamlet (1959)
- Ruy Blas (1961–1963)
- Dido and Aenaes (1963)
- Cyrano de Bergerac (1963)
- Ba-ta-clan (1963)
- Il Signor Bruschino (1963)
- Romeo and Juliet (1964)
- Le Bourgeois gentilhomme (1965)
- On ne badine pas avec l'amour (1966)
- Phèdre (1966)
- The Trojan War Will Not Take Place (1966)
- Le Ventriloque (1967)
- L'Apostrophe (1967)
- Marie Tudor (1967)
- On ne badine pas avec l'amour (1967)
- Britannicus (1967)
- La Fiancée de l'Europe (1968)
- The Count of Monte Cristo (1969)
- Les Fontaines de Madrid (1969)
- The Trojan War Will Not Take Place (1972)
