= Lost Signs =

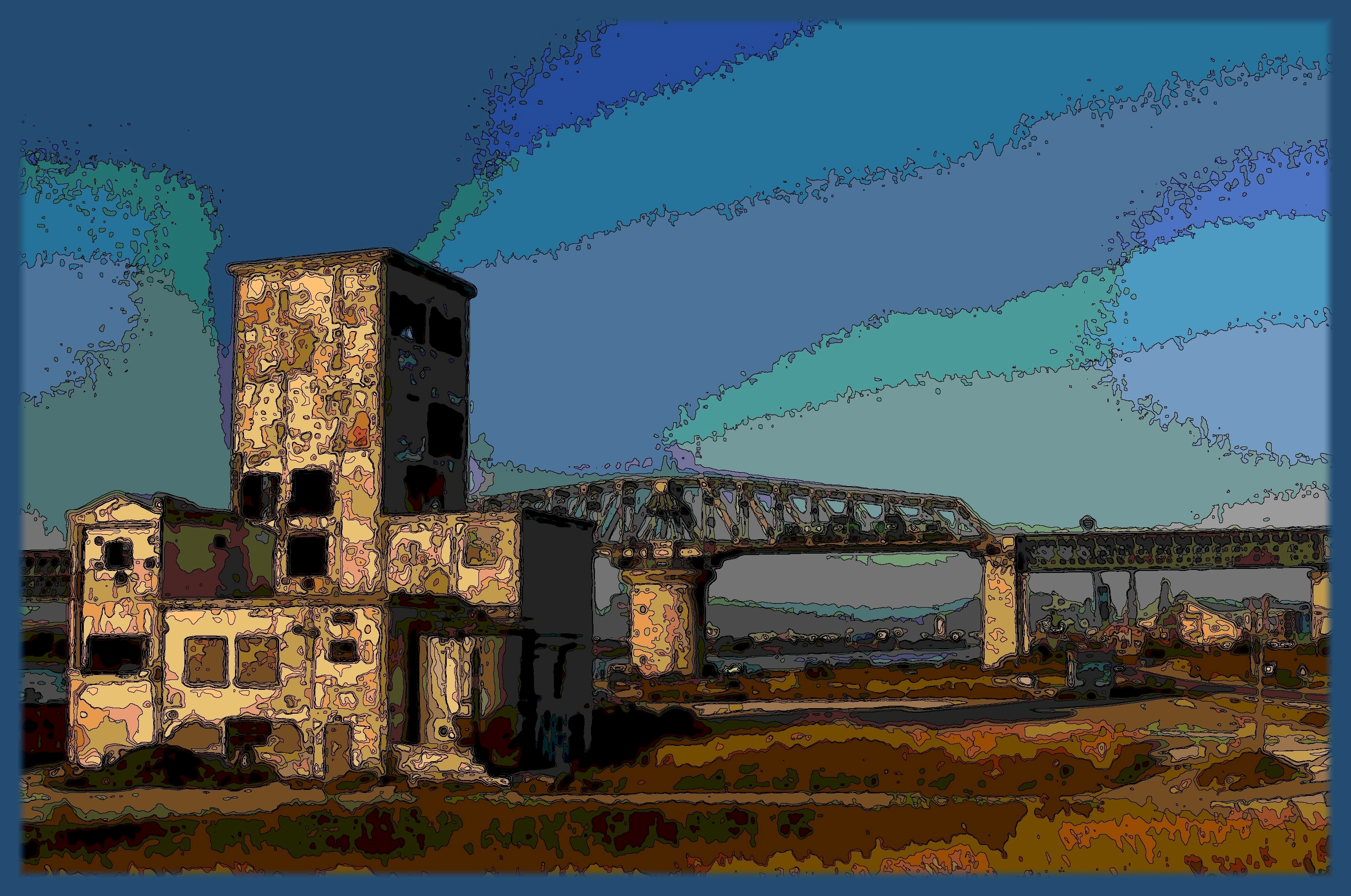
- Canal de Caronte in Martigues, France
- Mystère
- Genre: Mystery; Science fiction
- Written by: Malina Detcheva; Franck Ollivier
- Directed by: Didier Albert
- Starring: Toinette Laquière; Arnaud Binard
- Theme music composer: Frédéric Porte
- Countries of origin: France; Belgium; Switzerland
- Original language: French
- No. of episodes: 12

Production
- Producers: Paul Fonteyn; Anne Leduc; Arlette Zylberberg
- Cinematography: Philippe Lenouvel
- Editors: Elisabeth Juste; Diane Logan; Anja Lüdcke; Dominique Marcombe
- Camera setup: Dominique Pinto
- Running time: 52 min.

Original release
- Release: 13 June 2007 – 2007 (Belgium)
- Release: 13 June 2007 – 2007 (Switzerland)
- Release: 20 June – 25 July 2007 (France)

Lost Signs (French: Mystère) is a French television miniseries. The plot revolves around alien abductions. In France, the miniseries was first launched on 20 June 2007. The miniseries stars Toinette Laquière, who previously acted in another miniseries which was also written by Malina Detcheva and Franck Ollivier called Zodiac Murders 2.

== Cast ==
- Toinette Laquière : Laure de Lestrade
  - Louna Baudry : Young Laure
- Arnaud Binard : Xavier Mayer
- Yann Sundberg : François de Lestrade
- Babsie Steger : Erika de Lestrade
- Marisa Berenson : Irène de Lestrade
- François Vincentelli : Lorenzo Dallaglio
- Antoine de Prekel : Lucas de Lestrade
- Xavier Lafitte : Christopher Leroux
- Lio : Michèle Costa
- Farida Rahouadj : Lise Alban
- Cécile Pallas : Jeanne Laborde
- Samantha Marciszewer : Julie
- Zoé Duthion : Manon Dallaglio
- Ronald Guttman : Professeur Roger / Gaston Denis
- Fanny Cottençon : Anne de Lestrade
- Jean-Philippe Écoffey : Paul Costa
- Samuel Jouy : Thierry Courcelles
- Bernard Blancan : Simon Castaneda
- Adama Niane : Paolo Bruni
- Karen Alyx : Nurse Sandrine
- Patrick Bauchau : Général de Lestrade
- Max Boublil : Tom

== See also ==
- List of French television series
