= Guidestones (web series) =

Canadian thriller web series

- The Guidestones symbol
- Genre: Thriller
- Created by: Jay Ferguson
- Written by: Jay Ferguson; Jeremy Diamond
- Directed by: Jay Ferguson
- Starring: Supinder Wraich; Dan Fox; David Fox; Rosemary Dunsmore; Christina Jol; Amber Goldfarb; Gord Martineau
- Composer: Alex Khaskin
- Country of origin: Canada
- Original language: English
- No. of seasons: 1
- No. of episodes: 50 (push version); 34 (CTV/Hulu version)

Production
- Production locations: Toronto, Ontario, Canada; Buffalo, New York; Atlanta, Georgia; Delhi, India
- Cinematography: Rob Barnett; Jay Ferguson
- Editors: Anthony Baird; Thom Smalley
- Running time: 2-5 minutes (per episode)
- Production companies: Jonas Diamond; Jay Ferguson; Lisa Baylin; Catherine Tait

Original release
- Release: February 14, 2012

Guidestones is a Canadian award-winning thriller web series created by Jay Ferguson. It premiered in February 2012, distributed via email subscription as a real-time, interactive mystery series. In June 2012, the series launched a linear, on-demand version. The episodes are also available through CTV, a Facebook application and Hulu.

Season Two was in post-production, and has debuted in 2014.

Season One follows Sandy Rai (Supinder Wraich), who is living in Canada on exchange from India, and Trevor Shale (Dan Fox), a fellow Ryerson University School of Journalism student, as they become embroiled in the mystery of the Georgia Guidestones. An unsolved murder starts them on a search for the truth, which leads them to the mysterious monument in rural Georgia. Sandy and Trevor begin to realize that the conspiracy they are unraveling may have apocalyptic repercussions.

Season One was shot on location in Canada, the United States, and India on a budget of $300,000.

The series was produced by 3'oclock.tv and iThentic in association with the Independent Production Fund (IPF) and the Ontario Media Development Corporation (OMDC), and with help from corporate and organizational sponsors, including Pizza Pizza, Coca-Cola, Samsung, Toronto Blue Jays, Major League Baseball, Karbon, and William F. White International.

On 18 June 2012, the Independent Production Fund announced funding approval for a second season.

== Format ==
Guidestones - Season One was created in two versions: the first, a 50-episode "push" version, was launched online in February 2012 at and asked viewers to enter their email address in order to receive episodes in ‘real-time’, so that they could experience the events of the series in the same time frame as the characters. The "push" version could also be experienced on Facebook through an official Guidestones application.

The second, launched in June 2012, is a 34-episode "on-demand" version, which allows viewers to watch the series at their own pace, and can be seen on Hulu and the official Guidestones website.

== Cast ==
- Supinder Wraich as Sandy Rai
- Alex Castillo as Duke
- Dan Fox as Trevor Shale
- David Fox as Harold Glenndenning
- Rosemary Dunsmore as Jacqueline Glenndenning
- Christina Jol as T.A.
- Amber Goldfarb as Rebecca Glenndenning
- Arnaud Binard as Brooklyn Cott

== Reception ==
Guidestones won the Rockie Award for Best Webseries - Fiction at the 2012 Banff World Media Festival, and was chosen as an Official Selection at the Marseille Web Fest. In November 2012, the series was nominated for five International Academy of Web Television Awards, including Best Directing, Best Cinematography, Best Female Performance, Best Editing, and Best Supplemental Content.

At the 2012 Digi Awards, held in Toronto, Guidestones was nominated and won for Best Web Series: Fiction.

In 2013 Guidestones received the award for Best Original Series Produced for Digital Media at the 1st Canadian Screen Awards.

The series won the 2013 International Emmy Award for Best Digital Program: Fiction, awarded at the MIPTV Media Market in Cannes, France.

Additionally, the series has received a positive response from Wired.
