= Christian E. Christiansen =

Danish filmmaker

- Born: 14 December 1972 (age 53); Kalundborg, Denmark
- Occupations: Director; Writer
- Years active: 2006-present

Christian E. Christiansen (born 14 December 1972) is a Danish filmmaker.

He gained recognition after his short film At Night (2007) was nominated for the Best Live Action Short Film at the 80th Academy Awards, leading to his directorial debut in Hollywood with The Roommate (2011).

== Filmography ==
Work	Year	Credit	Notes
On the Edge (2014 film)	2014	Direction	DK/Feature
Catch the Dream	2013	Technical director	DK/Feature
The Roommate	2011	Direction	Feature
ID A	2011	Direction	DK/Feature
Zoomers	2009	Direction	DK/Feature
Crying for Love	2008	Direction	DK/Feature
Mikkel og guldkortet	2008	Direction	TV series
At Night	2007	Direction	DK/Short fiction
Råzone	2006	Direction	DK/Feature
Nynne	2005	Production	DK/Feature
The Bouncer	2003	Line producer	DK/Feature
The Monster	2002	Producer	DK/Short fiction
Gabriels Word	2002	Hospital Orderly	DK/Short fiction
Leïla	2001	Nils' ven	DK/Feature
Gottlieb	2001	Producer	DK/Short fiction
Postkort fra Mars	2001	Unit manager	DK/Short fiction
Ilddaab	1999	Producer	DK/Short fiction
The Olsen Gang's Last Trick	1998	Arkivarassistent	DK/Feature
Portland	1996	Runner	DK/Feature
Final Hour	1995	Finn	DK/Feature
Dark Heart	1995	Location manager	DK/Short fiction
Juletestamentet	1995	Production assistant	TV series
