= Laura Christensen =

Danish actress (born 1984)

- Born: 26 January 1984 (age 42); Østerbro, Copenhagen, Denmark
- Occupation: Actress
- Spouse: Thomas Levin
- Children: 2

Laura Christensen (born 26 January 1984) is a Danish actress.

== Biography ==
Christensen was born on 26 January 1984. She grew up in the Kartoffelrækkerne neighbourhood of Østerbro in Copenhagen.

In 1994, she made her debut as a child actor in the film Carl, My Childhood Symphony (Danish: Min fynske barndom, lit. 'My Funen childhood'). She had her first major role in Watch Me Fly.

She appeared in the TV series The Kingdom (Danish: Riget) as a brain-damaged girl named Mona.

She also had roles in Strisser på Samsø and TAXA.

In 2005, she was nominated for a Robert for best supporting actress for her portrayal of a teenage mother in Paprika Steen's Aftermath.

She appeared in The Investigation (2020), a limited series based on the investigation following the murder of Kim Wall, as Police Assistant Maibritt Prose.

Christensen is married to actor Thomas Levin. They have two children.

== Filmography ==
=== Film ===
Year	Title	Role	Notes
1994	Carl, My Childhood Symphony		
1996	Watch Me Fly		
2003	Midsommer		
2004	Aftermath		
2004	King's Game		
2006	Life Hits		
2008	The Candidate		
2009	Oldboys		
2011	A Funny Man		
2013	All for Two		

=== Television ===
Year	Title	Role	Notes
1994	The Kingdom	Mona Jensen	
1997	The Kingdom II		
1997–1999	Taxa	Fie Nielsen	33 Episodes
2007	The Killing		
2020	The Investigation	Maibritt Prose	
