= Jonatan Spang =

Danish standup comedian and actor

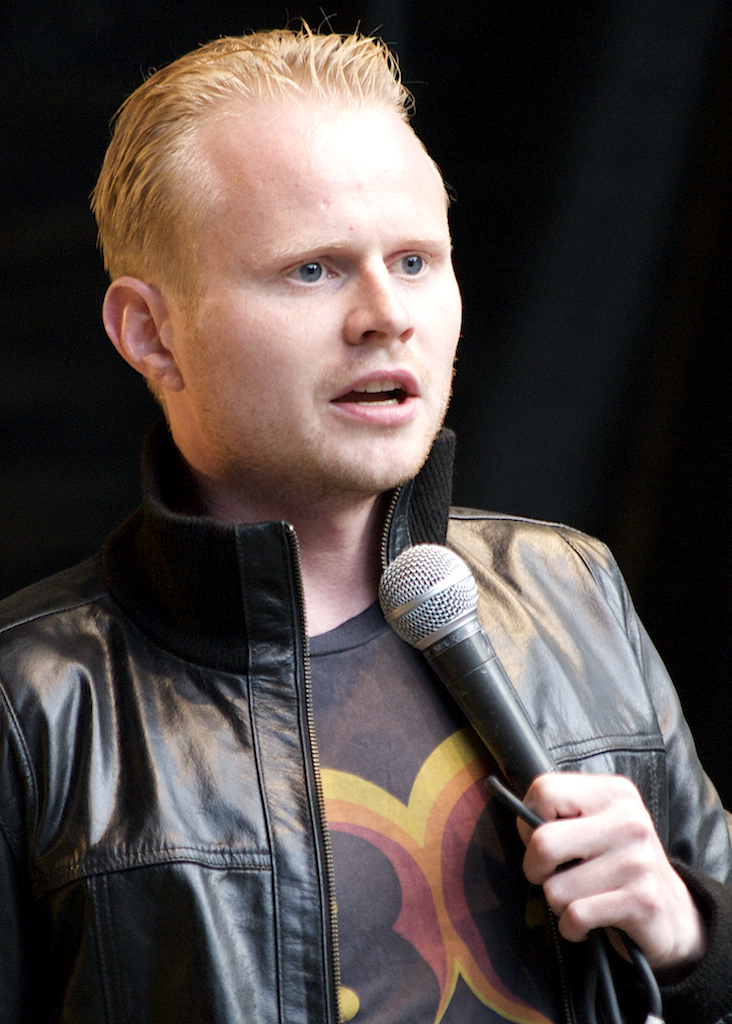
- Spang in 2009
- Born: Jannik Kåre Jonatan Spang Olesen; Gladsaxe, Denmark
- Occupations: Comedian, actor, theater director

Jannik Kåre Jonatan Spang Olesen is a Danish standup comedian, actor, and former theater director at Nørrebro Teater. Spang debuted as a standup comedian in 1998. The following year he was admitted to the School of Acting at Aarhus Theatre and won the championship in Stand-Up a talent competition for amateur comedians.

In 2025, Jonatan Spang was fired from Danmarks Radio after allegations of an inappropriate relationship with a 15-year-old girl.

== Theater and stand-up shows ==
- Damer (standup, 2005)
- Gynt (Betty Nansen Teater, 2005)
- Gustne Gensyn (standup, 2006)
- Købmanden (Betty Nansen Theatre, 2007)
- Biblen (standup, 2008)
- Jonatan Spangs Familie (standup, 2008)
- Familie (Stand up, 2008)
- Spark i Løgsuppen (standup, 2009)
- Kjeld og Dirch: En Kærlighedshistorie (Nørrebro Theatre, 2011)
- Bryllup (standup, 2013)
- Jonatan Spangs Danmark (Stand up, 2015)

== Filmography ==
- Fidibus (2006)
- De unge år (2007)
- Alle for en (2011)
- Over kanten (2012)
- Rivalen (2012)
- Forbrydelsen III (2012)
- Talenttyven (2012)
- Alle for to (2013)
- Tæt på sandheden (2017)
