= List of Danish television series =

The following is a list of television series produced in Denmark.

== 0–9 ==
- 2. sal til højre og venstre
- 2900 Happiness

== A ==
- Aladdin eller Den forunderlige lampe
- Album
- Alle elsker Debbie
- Alle os under himlen
- Angora by Night
- Anna - en fattig piges eventyr
- Anna og Lotte
- Anna Pihl
- Anne og Poul
- Anstalten
- Anthonsen
- Anton - min hemmelige ven
- Antiglobetrotter
- Apotekeren i Broager
- Arvefjender
- Aspiranterne
- Asta-basta-bum
- At ligge i sengen
- Autoophuggerens Børn

== B ==
- Bamses billedbog
- Bamses Lillebitte Billedbog
- Barbara
- Barda (rollespilsverden)
- Begær, lighed og broderskab
- Bingoland
- Blekingegade
- Blod, Sved og Springskaller
- Blyppernes første år
- Borgen
- Broen
- Bryggeren
- Bullerfnis
- Busters verden
- Børn

== C ==
- Carmen & Colombo
- Carsten og Gittes brevkasse
- Carsten og Gittes Vennevilla
- Casper & Mandrilaftalen
- Chapper & Pharfar
- Charlot og Charlotte
- Cirkeline
- Clausens garage
- Container Conrad
- Cosmos Chaos
- Crash

== D ==
- D.A.S.K.
- Da Lotte blev usynlig
- Daniels dukke
- Danish dynamite
- Danmark ifølge Bubber
- Danni
- De 10 på Trelde Næs
- De-næsten-gratis-glæder
- De udvalgte
- Decembervej
- Den 8. himmel
- Den gode, den onde og den virk'li sjove
- Den gode vilje
- Den grimme ælling og mig
- Den lille forskel
- Den otteøjede skorpion
- Den serbiske dansker
- Den som dræber
- Der kan man se
- Der var engang
- Deroute
- Det drejer sig om...
- Det kongelige spektakel
- Det Røde Kapel
- Det vildeste Westen
- Dicte
- Dolph & Wulff med venner
- Domino
- Dr.Dip
- Draculas ring
- Drengen de kaldte kylling
- Drengene fra Angora
- Drengene fra Ølsemagle
- Drengene og pigerne i klassen
- Duksedrengen
- Dybt vand
- Døren går op - hvem kommer ind

== E ==
- Edderkoppen
- Een stor familie
- Else Kant
- En by i provinsen
- En fri mand
- En gang strømer
- En lille rød pakke
- En nøgle til...?
- Er du skidt skat?
- Et par dage med Magnus

== F ==
- Fabrikshemmeligheden
- Familien Christensen
- Familien Edb'sen
- Familien Krahne
- Far, mor og Blyp
- Farvel, jeg hedder Kurt
- Feber i Fedtsted
- Fif, fup og fiduser
- Fikumdik
- Fire portrætter
- Fiskerne
- Fjernsyn for dyr
- Flemming og Berit
- Flid, fedt og snyd
- Forbrydelsen
- Forestillinger
- Forsvar
- Fortsættelse følger
- Forunderlige Frede
- Fredagsbio
- Frihed og ret
- Frihedens skygge
- Frøken Jensens pensionat
- Fæhår og Hartzen

== G ==
- Ghettoprinsesse
- Grundtvigs drøm
- Guldregn
- Gøngehøvdingen

== H ==
- Hamsun
- Hatten I Skyggen
- Hatten på arbejde
- Hatten rundt
- Hele den tyrkiske musik
- Henover midten
- Historietimen
- Hjem til fem
- Hjerteafdelingen
- Hjerteflimmer
- Hjælp... det er jul
- Hotellet
- Hulter til bulter - med Louise og Sebastian
- Huset på Christianshavn
- Hva' er der på Danmark
- Hvide løgne
- Hvor fanden er Herning?
- Hvor svært kan det være

== I ==
- I sandhedens tjeneste
- Ikk'
- Ikke lutter lagkage
- Ingermarie og Adam
- Isas stepz

== J ==
- Jacob - a love story
- Jason
- Jeg vil ha' dig
- Jeg ville ønske for dig
- Jerusalem
- Johanne i Troldeskoven
- John, Alice, Peter, Susanne og lille Verner
- Jul på Skovly
- Julie
- Jungledyret Hugo

== K ==
- Ka' De li' østers
- Kaj & Andrea
- Kaj Munk
- Kald mig Liva
- Kaos i opgangen
- Karrusel
- KatjaKaj & BenteBent
- Kidnapning
- Kirsebærhaven 89 : et stykke om / af fremtidens Danmark
- Kissmeyer Basic
- Klassen
- Klitgården
- Klovn
- Kongekabale
- Kongen, dronningen og hendes elsker
- Kongeriget
- Krigsdøtre
- Kristian
- Krysters kartel
- Krøniken
- Kun en pige
- Københavnerliv

== L ==
- Landsbyen
- Langt fra Las Vegas
- Lillefinger
- Limbo
- Livsens Ondskab
- Livvagterne
- Ludo
- Ludvigsbakke
- Lulu & Leon
- Lunas hemmelige plan
- Lykke
- Lærkevej
- Løgnhalsen

== M ==
- Madsen og Co.
- Magnus og Myggen
- Maj & Charlie
- Mandarinskolen
- Manden fra Mormugao
- Manden med de gyldne ører
- Matador
- Max
- Med Sussi på loftet
- Mellem venner
- Mette alene hjemme
- Miki - 3 år
- Mildest talt
- Mille
- Mille og Mikkel
- Mira + Marie
- Mit liv som Bent
- Mor er major
- Mr. Poxycat & Co
- Mørklægning

== N ==
- Nana
- Niels Klims underjordiske rejse
- Nikolaj og Julie
- Normalerweize
- Nu er det ikke sjovt længere
- Nynne
- Nævningene

== O ==
- Odas skolehistorier
- Olsen-bandens første kup
- Om at bestemme
- Omar og ondskabens akse
- Omar skal giftes
- Omsen & Momsen
- Op på ørerne, vi er kørende
- Operation Negerkys
- Opfinderkontoret
- Opgang
- Osman og Jeppe

== P ==
- P.I.S. – Politiets Indsats Styrke
- Pandaerne
- Parasitterne
- Parløb
- Pas på mor
- Perforama
- Pernille
- Petersens morgen, middag og aften
- Piger på prøveløsladelse
- Pip & Papegøje
- Plan B
- Prisgivet
- Pænt goddag
- På ferie hos mormor

== R ==
- Radio Karen
- Ras og Kathy
- Rasmus Klump
- Regnvejr og ingen penge
- Rejseholdet
- Rejseholdet (2000)
- Renters rente
- Ret beset
- Riget
- Ridder Ræddik
- Rita
- Robin Hat og jagten på den forsvundne skat
- Rockerne
- Ronnie Rosé siger helt godnat
- Rune Klan's Trylleshow
- Russian Pizza Blues
- Rytteriet

== S ==
- Sallies historier
- Sangen om 8a
- Sejlturen
- Settet.dk
- Sigurd og operaen
- Sigurd og symfoniorkestret
- Sigurds Bjørnetime
- SK 917 er netop landet
- Skattekortet
- Skjulte spor
- Skrumpen fra det ydre rum
- Skråplan
- Skæbner i hvidt
- Slemme Slemme piger
- Smuglerne
- Snuden
- Sommer
- Sonja fra Saxogade
- Sonny Soufflé Chok Show
- Specialklassen
- Stand-up.dk
- Station 13
- Stine, Anders og Jeanette
- Store Drømme
- Strandskoven
- Strandvaskeren
- Strenge tider
- Strisser på Samsø
- Sulevælling
- Super Carla
- Susan fra Sommerstedgade
- Sygeplejeskolen
- Søndage med Karl og Gudrun
- Søndagsbio
- Søren Kierkegaard Roadshow
- Sørøver Sally
- Søskende
- Så er der loppemarked
- Så hatten passer

== T ==
- Tak for i aften - Øgendahl & Klan on tour
- Tak fordi vi kom
- Tango for tre
- TAXA
- Teatret ved Ringvejen
- Timm & Gordon
- Tjeneren
- Toast
- Tonny Toupé-show - tv, der dræber!
- Tre ludere og en lommetyv
- Trio van Gogh
- Troldebjerget
- Trolderi
- Tung Metal
- Tyllefyllebølleby Banegård
- TV Sluk i TV Byen

== U ==
- Ude på Noget
- Udvikling
- Ugeavisen
- Ugen ud
- Ugler i mosen
- Ulf og Claus Show
- Ungdomssvin
- Unge Andersen

== V ==
- Ved Stillebækken
- Venner 4ever (1. afsnit af Mille)
- Vores år
- VQ – Videnskabsquiz for hele hjernen

== Y ==
- Y's Fantom farmor

== Z ==
- Zulu Djævleræs
- Zulu Gumball

== Ø ==
- Øen
- Ørnen

== Julekalendere ==
Christmas calendars listed with year(s) of broadcasting and station(s) broadcasting. There is usually a single season which may have reruns in December of later years.

- Absalons hemmelighed (2006, 2010, DR1 / 2010, Ramasjang)
- Alle tiders jul (1994, 2004, TV2)
- Alletiders julemand (1997, 2007, TV2)
- Alle tiders nisse (1995, 2006, TV2)
- Andersens julehemmelighed : en kriminallystspilskomedie (1993, 1998, TV2)
- Avisen (1982, 1990, 1997, DR1)
- Bamses julerejse (1996, 1999, 2005, DR1 / 2012, Ramasjang)
- Besøg på decembervej (1968, DR1)
- Bonus og Minus (1964, DR1)
- Brødrene Mortensens jul (1998, 2002, TV2)
- Børnenes ulandskalender (1966, DR1)
- Cirkus Julius (1988, DR1)
- CWC - Canal Wild Card (2002, TV2)
- CWC World (2003, TV2 / 2003, 2005, Zulu)
- De to i ledvogterhuset (1969, DR1)
- Den hemmelige tunnel (1997, DR1)
- Eldorado for dyr (1985, DR1)
- Fru Pigalopp og juleposten (1978, DR1)
- Gufol mysteriet, by rebroadcasting in 2004 called: Station 7-9-13 (1997, 2004, TV2)
- Hallo det er jul! (1995, DR1)
- Historier fra hele verden (1962, DR1)
- Hjælp, det er jul (2011, DR2)
- Hos Ingrid og lillebror (1971, DR1)
- Hvad en møller kan komme ud for, når der er nisser på loftet (1970, DR1)
- Jesus & Josefine (2003, 2009, TV2)
- Jul i den gamle Trædemølle (1990, 1996, 2009, TV2)
- Jul i Gammelby (1979, 1983, 1994, DR1, 2009, Ramasjang)
- Jul i hjemmeværnet (2001, DR2)
- Jul i Juleland (1993, TV2)
- Jul i Svinget (2007, DR1 / 2010, Ramasjang)
- Jul i Valhal (2005, 2012, TV2)
- Jul i verdensrummet (2006, DR2)
- Jul og grønne skove, also called: Poul og Nulle i hullet (1980, DR1)
- Jul på Kronborg (2000, 2004, DR1)
- Jul på slottet (1986, 1991, 1998, DR1)
- Jul på Vesterbro (2003, 2004, 2009, DR2)
- Julefandango (2008, 2009, DR1)
- Julestjerner (2012, DR1 / 2012, Ramasjang)
- Juleteatret (1965, DR1)
- Juletestamentet (1995, 1999, TV2)
- Jullerup Færgeby (1974, 1982, 1990, 1997, DR1)
- Kender du decembervej ? (1967, DR1)
- Kikkebakke Boligby (1977, 1985, DR1)
- Krummernes jul (1996, 2001, TV2)
- Ludvig og Julemanden (2011, TV2)
- Magnus Tagmus (1971, DR1)
- Martin & Ketil - jul for begyndere (2005, 2009, TV2 / 2005, Zulu)
- Mikkel og guldkortet (2008, TV2)
- Mumidalen (1980, DR1)
- Nissebanden (1984, 1992, 2001, DR1)
- Nissebanden i Grønland (1989, 1993, 2002, 2011, DR1 / 2011, Ramasjang)
- Nisserne Tim og Tam (1963, DR1)
- Nissernes Ø (2003, 2008, DR1)
- Noget om nisser (1972, DR1)
- Olsen-bandens første kup (1999, TV2)
- Omars jul (2005, DR2)
- Pagten (2009, DR1, Ramasjang)
- Poul og Nulle i hullet. Nickname for "Jul og grønne skove" (1980, DR1)
- Pyrus i alletiders eventyr (2000, 2010, TV2)
- Skibet i skilteskoven (1992, TV2)
- "Station 7-9-13" was the retitling of Gufol mysteriet in 2004 (TV2)
- The Julekalender (1991, 1994, 2001, 2008, 2010, 2011, 2012, TV2)
- Torvet (1981, 1987, DR1)
- Vinterbyøster (1973, 1976, DR1)
- Vumserne og juleforberedelser (1975, DR1)
- Yallahrup Færgeby (2007, DR2)
