= Nordic Christmas calendar =

Radio or television genre

A Christmas calendar (Danish: julekalender, Swedish: julkalender, Norwegian: julekalender, Finnish: joulukalenteri, Icelandic: jóladagatal, Faroese: jólakalendari) is a form of Nordic episodic radio or television advent calendar focused on Christmas. It was first introduced in 1957, in Sweden, with the radio series, Barnens adventskalender.

Each series consists of 24 episodes which air daily beginning on the first of December, and ending on Christmas Eve. The first Christmas calendar was the Swedish Titteliture. The first such series aired in Denmark was Historier fra hele verden in 1962. The form gradually extended into the other Nordic countries of Norway, Finland and Iceland, and in the 21st century also extended into Germany.

Most Christmas calendars are produced for children, while some cater to both children and adults, and even some are directed at adults alone. Many Christmas calendar series, such as the 1979 Norwegian Jul i Skomakergata, and the 1990 Icelandic Á baðkari til Betlehem have become classics in their respective countries, and are enjoyed both by children and adults (if purely for nostalgic reasons).

Christmas calendars very often feature "tomter" or "nisser", and occasionally a Santa Claus figure.

== By country ==
=== Iceland ===
==== RÚV ====
- Jólin nálgast í Kærabæ (1988)
- Á baðkari til Betlehem (1990)
- Stjörnustrákur (1991)
- Tveir á báti (1992)
- Jól á leið til jarðar (1994)
- Hvar er Völundur? (1996)
- Klængur sniðugi (1997)
- Töfrakúlan (2005)
- Jólaævintýri Dýrmundar (2008)
- Randalín og Mundi: Dagar í desember (2022)

=== Norway ===
==== NRK ====
- Barnas førjulskalender 1970 (1970)
- Jul i Skomakergata (1979)
- Teodors julekalender (1986)
- Portveiens julekalender (1987)
- Vertshuset den gyldne hale (1989)
- Jul på Sesam stasjon (1992)
- Amalies jul (1995)
- Jul i Blåfjell (1999)
- Jul på Månetoppen (2002)
- Jul i Svingen (2006)
- Barnas Superjul (2007)
- Willys jul (2007)
- Pagten (2010)
- Julekongen (2012)
- Snøfall (2016)
- Stjernestøv (2020)
- Kristianias Magiske Tivoli Theater (2021)

==== TV 2 ====
- The Julekalender (1994)
- Julefergå (1995)
- Vazelina Hjulkalender (2000)
- Olsenbandens første kupp (2001)
- Jul i Valhall (2006)

==== TVNorge ====
- Nissene på låven (2001)
- Ungkarsnissen (2004)
- Jul i Tøyengata (2006)
- Den unge Fleksnes (2010)
- Nissene over skog og hei (2011)
- Asbjørns julekalender (2015)
- Jul i Blodfjell (2017)
- Jul i Blodfjell 2 (2019)

==== TV3 ====
- Tjuefjerde (2005)

=== Denmark ===
==== DR1 ====
- Historier fra hele verden (1962)
- Nisserne Tim og Tam (1963)
- Bonus og Minus (1964)
- Juleteatret - Kasper og Lisette (1965)
- Kender du Decembervej? (1967)
- Besøg på Decembervej (1968)
- De to i Ledvogterhuset (1969)
- Hvad en møller kan komme ud for (1970)
- Hos Ingrid og Lillebror (1971)
- Noget om nisser (1972)
- Vinterbyøster (1973)
- Jullerup Færgeby (1974)
- Vumserne og juleforberedelser (1975)
- Kikkebakkeboligby (1977)
- Fru Pigalopp og juleposten (1978)
- Jul i Gammelby (1979)
- Mumidalen (1980)
- Jul og grønne skove (1980)
- Torvet (1981)
- Avisen (1982)
- Nissebanden (1984)
- Eldorado for dyr (1985)
- Jul på slottet (1986)
- Cirkus Julius (1988)
- Nissebanden i Grønland (1989)
- Bamses julerejse (1996)
- Den hemmelige tunnel (1997)
- Jul på Kronborg (2000)
- Nissernes ø (2003)
- Absalons Hemmelighed (2006)
- Jul i svinget (2007)
- Julefandango 2008 (2008)
- Julefandango 2009 (2009)
- Pagten (2009)
- Sebastians jul (2010)
- Julestjerner (2012)
- Tidsrejsen (2014)
- Den Anden Verden (2016)
- Snefald (2017)
- Theo & Den Magiske Talisman (2018)
- Julefeber (2020)

==== TV2 ====
- Trolderik og Nisserne (1990)
- Jul i den gamle Trædemølle (1990)
- Trolderiks Julekalender (1991)
- The Julekalender (1991)
- Skibet i skilteskoven (1992)
- Trolderiks posthule (1992)
- Jul i Juleland (1993)
- Andersens julehemmelighed : en kriminallystspilskomedie (1993)
- Alletiders jul (1994)
- Alletiders nisse (1995)
- Krummernes jul (1996)
- Gufol mysteriet (1997)
- Alletiders julemand (1997)
- Brødrene Mortensens jul (1998)
- Olsen-bandens første kup (1999)
- Alletiders eventyr (2000)
- CWC - Canal Wild Card (2002)
- CWC World (2003)
- Jesus og Josefine (2003)
- Martin og Ketil - jul for begyndere (2005)
- Jul i Valhal (2005)
- Mikkel og guldkortet (2008)
- Ludvig og Julemanden (2011)
- Tvillingerne og Julemanden (2012)

==== DR2 ====
- Jul i hjemmeværnet (2001)
- Jul på Vesterbro (2003)
- Omars jul (2005)
- Jul i verdensrummet (2006)
- Yallahrup færgeby (2007)
- Hjælp, det er jul (2011)
- Jul i kommunen (2012)

=== Finland ===
==== YLE ====
- Histamiinin joulukalenteri (1980)
- Histamiinin joulukalenteri (1985)
- Olga P. Postisen joulukalenteri (1987, 1996)
- Elf Toljander (1998–2013)
- Joulukalenteri: Porokuiskaajan arvoitus (2014)
- Joulukalenteri: Jäätävä seikkailu (2016)

==== MTV3 ====
- Uppo-Nalle ja joulun odotus (1995)
- The Joulukalenteri (1997)

== See also ==
- Nisse
- The Cinnamon Bear
- Pyrus Series
- Santa Claus
