= De Nattergale =

Danish comedy band/act

De Nattergale is a Danish comedy band/act. They have made several CDs and three TV advent calendars on TV2, of which the most famous is The Julekalender (of which a Norwegian version was made in 1994, and a Finnish version appeared in 1997). The group consists of Viggo Sommer, Carsten Knudsen and Uffe Rørbæk Madsen.

The word Nattergale is a pun, and could mean both "nightingale", as the group sing, but also "nattergale", which means "night-crazy" - "lunatics".

The group as it is now was formed in 1983, although Viggo and Carsten met each other as early as in 1979. The group released their first album in 1988 called Hva har vi da gjort ... siden vi ska' ha'et så godt. In 1989 they released their first hit record entitled Nu ka' det vist ik bli' meget bedre which includes their two hit singles: "Uha-da-da" and "Gule ærter".

The group are known for their invented nonsensical expressions and for speaking in a mixture of English and their own language. They have been described as an example of how rural Jutland "celebrates its own worth and qualities".

In later years they have had a comeback with their advent calendars: The Julekalender, Canal Wild Card, and CWC World. Their album Songs from the Julekalender reached #14 in the Danish record charts. while The Boks reached #3.
