= Jóladagatal Sjónvarpsins =

Icelandic Christmas calendar television series

Jóladagatal Sjónvarpsins is an ongoing Icelandic Christmas calendar television series, produced by public television channel Sjónvarpið.

== List of series ==
There was no Christmas calendar broadcast in 1989.

Year	Title	Created by	Original production?
1988	Jólin nálgast í Kærabæ	Iðunn Steinsdóttir	Yes
1990	Á baðkari til Betlehem	Sigurður G. Valgeirsson & Sveinbjörn I. Baldvinsson	Yes
1991	Stjörnustrákur	Sigrún Eldjárn	Yes
1992	Tveir á báti	Kristín Atladóttir	Yes
1993	Jul i Mumindalen	Pi Lind & Ingegerd Lönnroth	No (Icelandic Dub, Series originally from Sweden)
1994	Jól á leið til jarðar	Friðrik Erlingsson & Sigurður Örn Brynjólfsson	Yes
1995	Á baðkari til Betlehem	Sigurður G. Valgeirsson & Sveinbjörn I. Baldvinsson	(rerun)
1996	Hvar er Völundur?	Þorvaldur Þorsteinsson	Yes
1997	Klængur sniðugi	Davíð Þór Jónsson & Steinn Ármann Magnússon	Yes
1998	Stjörnustrákur	Sigrún Eldjárn	(rerun)
1999	Jól á leið til jarðar	Friðrik Erlingsson & Sigurður Örn Brynjólfsson	(rerun)
2000	Tveir á báti	Kristín Atladóttir	(rerun)
2001	Leyndardómar jólasveinsins		No (Icelandic Dub, series originally from Germany)
2002	Hvar er Völundur?	Þorvaldur Þorsteinsson	(rerun)
2003	Klængur sniðugi	Davíð Þór Jónsson & Steinn Ármann Magnússon	(rerun)
2004	Á baðkari til Betlehem	Sigurður G. Valgeirsson & Sveinbjörn I. Baldvinsson	(rerun)
2005	Töfrakúlan	Jóhann G. Jóhannsson & Þóra Sigurðardóttir	Yes
2006	Stjörnustrákur	Sigrún Eldjárn	(rerun)
2007	Jól á leið til jarðar	Friðrik Erlingsson & Sigurður Örn Brynjólfsson	(rerun)
2008	Jólaævintýri Dýrmundar	Davíð Þór Jónsson, Halldór Gylfason & Þorkell Heiðarsson	Yes
2009	Klængur sniðugi	Davíð Þór Jónsson & Steinn Ármann Magnússon	(rerun)
2010	Jól í Snædal	Kjetil Indregard	No (Icelandic Dub, Series originally from Norway)
2011	Pagten	Maya Ilsøe	No (Icelandic Dub, Series originally from Denmark)
2012	Hvar er Völundur?	Þorvaldur Þorsteinsson	(rerun)
2013	Julkongen	Lars Gudmestad & Harald Rosenløw Eeg.	No (Icelandic Dub, Series originally from Norway)
2014	Jesú og Jósefína	Bo Hr. Hansen & Nikolaj Scherfig	No (Icelandic Dub, Series originally from Denmark)
2015	Tímaflakkið	DR, Poul Berg and Kaspar Munk	No (Icelandic Dub, Series originally from Denmark)
2016	Pagten	Maya Ilsøe	No (Icelandic Dub, Series originally from Denmark)
2017	Snæholt	Hege Waagbø	No (Icelandic Dub, Series originally from Norway)
2018	Hvar er Völundur?	Þorvaldur Þorsteinsson	(rerun)
2019	Julkongen	Lars Gudmestad & Harald Rosenløw Eeg.	No (Icelandic Dub, Series originally from Norway)
2020	Jól í Snædal	Kjetil Indregard	No (Icelandic Dub, Series originally from Norway)
2021	Saga Selmu	Per Simonsson & Stefan Roos	No (Icelandic Dub, Series originally from Sweden)
2021	Julefeber	Rune Schjøtt & Natasha Arthy	No (Icelandic Dub, Series originally from Denmark)
2022	Randalín og Mundi: Dagar í December	Þórdís Gísladóttir	Yes
2023	Tímaflakkið	DR, Poul Berg and Kaspar Munk	No (Icelandic Dub, Series originally from Denmark)
2024	Þorri og Þura bíða eftir jólunum	TBD	Yes
2025	Snæholt 2	Hege Waagbø	No (Icelandic Dub, Series originally from Norway)
