= Anders Matthesen =

Danish stand-up comedian, actor, and rapper (born 1975)

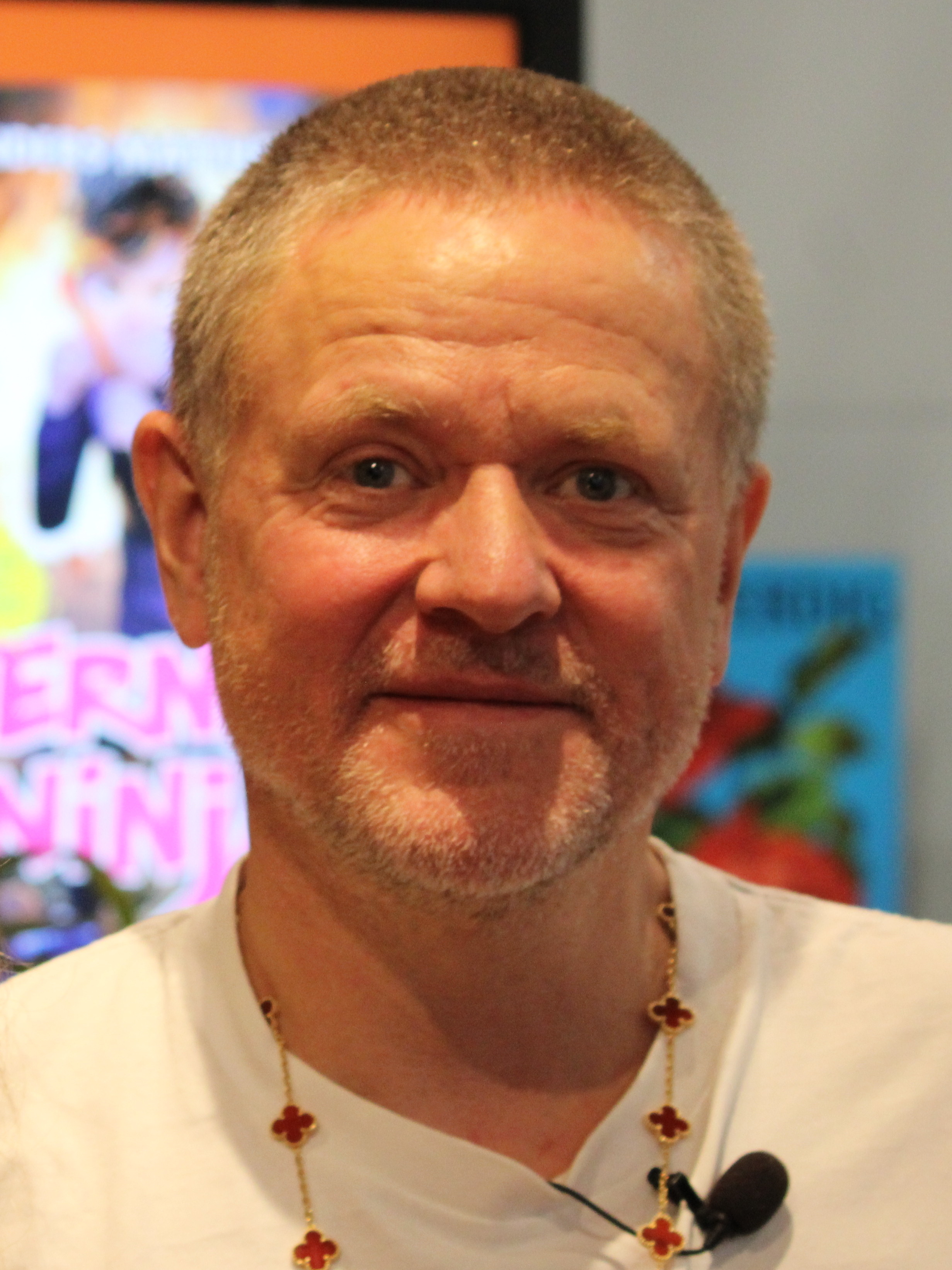
- Matthesen in 2025
- Born: 6 July 1975 (age 51); Copenhagen, Denmark
- Other name: Anden (the Duck)
- Occupations: Stand-up comedian; rapper; actor
- Years active: 1993–present
- Known for: Terkel in trouble; Jul på Vesterbro; Checkered Ninja
- Awards: Grand Danois 2007 for Best Laugh
- Musical career
- Genre: Rap
- Instrument: Vocals
- Website: anden.dk

Anders Matthesen (born 6 July 1975) is a Danish stand-up comedian, actor, and rapper. As a musician and comedian, he performs under the name Anden ("the duck"). He has released two rap records and several comedy albums. He has written and directed several animated films, including Terkel in Trouble (2004), Checkered Ninja (2018), Checkered Ninja 2 (2021), and Checkered Ninja 3. He is the creator of the 2003 TV Christmas calendar Jul på Vesterbro, and he has appeared in several television series as well as in the 2022 film Toscana.

== Early life and education ==
Anders Matthesen was born in 1975 in Østerbro, Copenhagen, Denmark, to parents who are both visual artists. After a few years, the family moved to Frederiksberg, and when Matthesen was six, his parents divorced. When he was in second grade, he and his older brother moved to Albertslund.

== Career ==
=== Early work: 1993–2000 ===
Matthesen made his stand-up comedy debut at the Danish Championship in Stand-up Comedy in 1993, where he finished in second place, losing only to Mads M. Nielsen. He continued to perform in stand-up shows and also began appearing in television segments. In 1999, he featured in ten episodes of DR2's sketch comedy show Casper & Mandrilaftalen.

In 2000, Matthesen had several songwriting credits on the comedy/music compilation album Hva' snakker du om? – Den ka' byttes Vol. 1, under the name Anden ("the duck").

=== Terkel in Trouble, Jul på Vesterbro, and further work (2001–2008) ===
In 2001, Matthesen released the comedy album Arne fortæller... Terkel i knibe, which was adapted into the adult animated musical comedy film Terkel in Trouble in 2004.

In 2003, he created the satirical TV Christmas calendar Jul på Vesterbro.

In 2004, Matthesen performed at Østre Gasværk Teater in Copenhagen, in the production Simon, portraying the titular Simon Spies. The daily Berlingske praised his performance, calling him "phenomenal". In 2006, he toured Denmark with his comedy show Anden paa coke? That year, he released his debut rap album, titled Soevnloes.

In 2008, Matthesen worked as a scriptwriter on the TV series Comedy kuren, and the same year, he received the Livsglædens Pris, worth 200,000 DKK, awarded by the Simon Spies Foundation. The same year, he toured with his stand-up show Anders Matthesen...vender tilbage, and a recording made at the Royal Danish Theatre in Copenhagen was released on DVD in 2009.

=== Directorial debut and second album (2009–2015) ===
In 2009, Matthesen made his directorial debut with the comedy film Sorte kugler, which he also wrote and starred in. In 2022, the film was remade by Indian director Indra Kumar in Hindi and titled Thank God.

In 2010, he released his second rap album, titled Villa Peakstate. It received poor reviews from GAFFA magazine but was nominated for Danish Hip Hop Album of the Year at the GAFFA-Prisen awards the same year.

In November 2011, Matthesen announced that his new stand-up show, titled Anders, was in production. It premiered on 5 September 2012 and received the best reviews of any of his shows to date.

In 2013, he played a minor role as a weapons dealer in the film Det grå guld. A Berlingske review stated that Matthesen "delivers the film's best laughs".

In 2015, Matthesen appeared on the track "Tæl Til 10" from Danish rapper Pato Siebenhaar's EP Skarp.

=== Checkered Ninja and The Other Side (2016–2019) ===
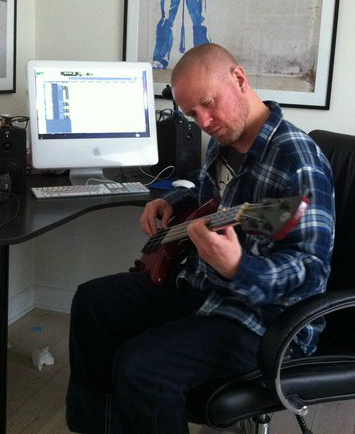
Anders Matthesen in 2011

In 2016, Matthesen announced his solo show Shhh, which premiered at the Falkoner Center on 2 September. In October, he published the children's novel Ternet Ninja, which was praised by Politiken for resonating with its audience. The book received the Orla Prize for Best Story in 2017.

On 27 April 2017, the documentary The Other Side premiered. Directed by Pernille Rose Grønkjær, it follows Matthesen between his two solo shows Anders and Shhh, from 2013 to 2016. The film received positive reviews overall. B.T. and Soundvenue gave it four out of six stars, while Filmmagasinet Ekko awarded it five out of six. The production also received five out of six stars from DR, whose reviewer noted that the openness of the film was not only "an exciting portrait of Matthesen, but also [...] a fascinating image of a creative process". The critic for Politiken, Kristoffer Hegnsvad, gave the film three out of six hearts and expressed mild disappointment as a fan of the director. He felt the meeting between "one of Denmark's best documentarists and one of Denmark's greatest comedians" did not provide enough depth, noting that the film "[lacks] a thought that rises above the navel or one that seriously probes". However, he praised it for being "the most well-produced Danish documentary I have seen in years", especially for Jacob Thuesen and Kasper Leick's editing and Torsten Høgh Rasmussen's design.

On 12 April 2019, an animated film adaptation of Ternet Ninja, titled Checkered Ninja, was released, which Matthesen wrote, directed, and voiced. It became a hit, selling over 220,000 tickets in the first four days, setting a record. By May, it had sold 940,000 tickets, making it the sixth most-watched Danish film of all time.

Also in 2019, Matthesen starred in Frederikke Aspöck's dark comedy film Out of Tune.

=== Checkered Ninja 2, Toscana, and JOKES – from a White, Straight Man (2021–present) ===
In 2021, Checkered Ninja 2 was released. Like its predecessor, it was both critically acclaimed and popular with audiences. The film set a new record, with 246,684 tickets sold in its opening weekend, the largest for a Danish film ever. At the 2022 Robert Awards, it won for Best Children's and Family Film, and Matthesen won for Best Adapted Screenplay. He also won Best Actor at the 2022 Bodil Awards.

In 2022, Matthesen starred in the film Toscana, directed by Medi Avaz. It received lukewarm reviews but became the most-watched non-English-language film on Netflix in Denmark during its release week.

In 2022/2023, Matthesen toured Denmark with his solo show JOKES – from a White, Straight Man.

In 2023, it was announced that a third installment of the Checkered Ninja film series was in the works and that it would come out in August 2025.

In 2025, Matthesen portrayed Danish musician Tommy Seebach in the film Under stjernerne på himlen.

== Personal life ==
In 2013, Matthesen married his partner of over three years, Cemille Rosenberg, who is his manager and has two children from a previous relationship. They have a son, born in 2011.

== Discography ==
Comedy and music albums

- Børneradio (2000)
- Hva' snakker du om? – Den ka' byttes Vol. 1 (2000)
- Hva snakker du om? 'Godnat lille dengse' Sang af Hva' snakker du om? (2000)
- Hva' snakker du om? – Arne fortæller... Terkel i knibe (2001)
- Soevnloes (2006)
- Villa Peakstate (2010)
- Blodhævn as Stewart Stardust (2018)
- Børnetelefonen (2018)
- Anden bringer ud (2019)

Soundtracks

- Jul på Vesterbro (2003)
- Terkel i knibe (2004)
- Sorte kugler (2009)
- Ternet Ninja (2018)
- Ternet Ninja 2 (2021)

== Filmography ==
List of film and television appearances, with year, title, and role shown
Year	Title	Role	Notes
1999	Casper & Mandrilaftalen	Doctor Doctor	TV series; 10 episodes
2003	Jul på Vesterbro	All roles	TV series; 24 episodes
2004	Terkel in Trouble	All voice roles	Writer
2006	Rene hjerter	Kriss Henriksen	
2008–2009	Comedy kuren		TV series
2009	Sorte kugler	Alex Klein	Director, writer
2010	Olsen Gang Gets Polished	Detective Assistant Jensen	
2013	Det Grå Guld	Kenny	
2018	Checkered Ninja	All minor voice roles	Director, writer
2021	Checkered Ninja 2	All minor voice roles	Director, writer
2022	Toscana	Theo Dahl	
2025	Second Victims	Karl	
2025	Checkered Ninja 3	All minor voice roles	Director, writer

== Honors and awards ==
Matthesen has received numerous awards and nominations throughout his career, including:

- 2001
  - Danish Music Awards: Best Entertainment Release for Hva' snakker du om? – Den ka' byttes Vol. 1 (2000)
- 2002
  - Danish Music Awards: Best Entertainment Release for Hva' snakker du om? – Arne fortæller... Terkel i knibe (2001)
- 2005
  - Robert Award
    - Best Children's and Youth Film for Terkel i knibe
    - Audience Award
    - Best Original Song for "Paranoia"
- 2007
  - Reumert Award: Best Musical/Theatre Show for Anden paa coke?
  - Grand Danois
    - Best Idol – Anders Matthesen
    - Best Laughter – Anden paa coke?
- 2008
  - Livsglædens Pris (Joy of Life Award) from Simon Spies Foundation, with 200,000 DKK
  - Teaterflisen, a tile on Frederiksberg Allé
  - Holberg Medal with the citation: "With a unique linguistic and character-building creativity, he critically and comically addresses society's peculiarities on stage, film, and TV. His sensitivity to the playful dynamics of speech manifests in stylistic diversity and controversial impact".
- 2009
  - Svendprisen: Best Male Actor – Anders Matthesen
  - Zulu Comedy Galla: Comedian of the Year for Sorte kugler
  - Tribini Prize, awarded at Dyrehavsbakken. The director praised him for his love of words and playful use of language.
- 2010
  - Robert Award: Audience Award for Sorte kugle
  - Zulu Awards
    - Danish Actor of the Year – Anders Matthesen
    - Danish Film of the Year – Sorte kugler
  - Frederiksberg Artist of the Year, awarded by Frederiksberg Municipality.
- 2013
  - Zulu Comedy Galla: Comedian of the Year for the show Anders
- 2017
  - Blixen Prize: Best Audiobook for Ternet Ninja
  - Orla Prize: Best Story for Ternet Ninja
- 2018
  - Reality Awards: Best Bitch Fight – Jannik Rundholdt vs. Fie Laursen
- 2019
  - Robert Award
    - Best Adapted Screenplay – Anders Matthesen / Ternet Ninja
    - Best Children's and Family Film – Ternet Ninja
    - Best Original Song for "Skubber det sne"
  - Pråsprisen for Ternet Ninja
  - Svendprisen
    - Danish Film of the Year – Ternet Ninja
    - Jury's Special Prize – Anders Matthesen
  - Zulu Awards: Danish Film of the Year for Ternet Ninja
  - Zulu Comedy Galla: Comedian of the Year for his jubilee show Anden 25 and the film Ternet Ninja (first to win three times)
- 2021
  - Robert Award
    - Best Adapted Screenplay for Ternet Ninja
    - Best Children's and Family Film for Ternet Ninja
- 2022
  - Bodil Award
    - Best Actor for Ternet Ninja 2
