= Checkered Ninja =

2018 Danish animated film

- Film poster
- Danish: Ternet Ninja
- English: Checkered Ninja
- Directed by: Thorbjørn Christoffersen; Anders Matthesen
- Screenplay by: Anders Matthesen
- Based on: Checkered Ninja by Anders Matthesen
- Produced by: Anders Mastrup; Trine Heidegaard; Cemille Matthesen
- Starring: Anders Matthesen; Alfred Bjerre Larsen; Emma Sehested Høeg
- Cinematography: Niels Grønlykke
- Edited by: Kristian Håskjold
- Music by: Christian Vinten
- Production companies: A. Film; Pop Up Production; Sudoku ApS
- Distributed by: Nordisk Film (Scandinavia); LevelK (rest of the world)
- Release date: 25 December 2018 (Denmark)
- Running time: 81 minutes
- Country: Denmark
- Languages: Danish; English
- Box office: $2 million

Checkered Ninja (Danish: Ternet Ninja) is a 2018 Danish adult-animated urban fantasy action comedy film, directed by Anders Matthesen, and Thorbjørn Christoffersen, and based on Matthesen's 2016 novel Ternet Ninja and serves as a standalone sequel to Terkel in Trouble from 2004. It stars Anders Matthesen and Alfred Bjerre Larsen.

The film was released on December 25, 2018, to a positive response and box office success.

The film was dubbed to English in 2019, with an Irish cast, and the dubbed version was released on Amazon Prime and iTunes. The international sales of the film has been handled by LevelK Film while the dubbing was done by Moetion Films.

== Plot ==
In Thailand, Danish businessman Phillip Eppermint arrives to check on his new factory filled with child laborers. After a young boy named Quang accidentally uses his scarf to create a checkered ninja plush doll, Eppermint brutally beats the child to death. At that moment, lightning strikes, causing the doll to be possessed by the spirit of a deceased ninja. As the Checkered Ninja ends up on a Danish cargo ship, he is picked up by Stewart Stardust, who gives the doll to his nephew Alex Stenstrom as a birthday present. At school, the ninja defends Alex's friend, Odysseus, from a bully named Glenn using Alex’s voice. After school, Alex learns that the doll is alive after he insults Glenn. Glenn chases Alex throughout Albertslund and the doll quickly gets rid of him and the two quickly become friends. The ninja promises to help Alex in exchange for him unknowingly helping him get revenge against Eppermint using his lost credit card as a lie to return it to him. Alex realizes that Eppermint shares the same last name as his crush Jessica, then learns from his mother that Jessica’s dad is also called Phillip, so the ninja makes sure that Alex is invited to Jessica’s upcoming party on Saturday.

After Alex’s stepbrother Sean, attempts to tell everyone about his crush on Jessica, the Ninja, using Alex’s voice and the school intercom, confesses Alex’s love for her to the whole school. Alex and the Ninja challenge Glenn to a fight on the same day as Jessica’s party. Choosing the playground for the fight, Alex and the Ninja build traps to ensure Alex’s win. On the night before the fight, Alex asks the doll if he is a real ninja, to which he responds by telling him about ninja clans that lived in Iga Province and how the samurai were sent to massacre them. A ninja named Taiko Nakamura was given the mission of protecting the clan’s children whilst fleeing the province. However, one of the clan members betrayed Nakamura, informing the Nobunaga soldiers to Nakamura’s hut. Nakamura killed most of the soldiers, but they burnt down the hut, killing the clan’s children. Enraged, he vowed for vengeance in exchange for his soul, committing seppuku. His soul left his body, killing the traitor, and went on to become a wandering spirit that dedicates himself to protecting children.

On the day of the fight, Alex wins, gaining him popularity and causing Jessica to invite him to her party. At the party, Alex and the ninja confront her father, actually not who the ninja is looking for as he spells his last name ‘Eppermynt’. Eppermynt gives Alex and the ninja Eppermint’s address. The ninja wants Alex to leave the party to go to Eppermint’s house but he refuses, causing the ninja to embarrass him in front of everyone. Alex is forced to join after the ninja insults Jessica using Alex’s voice in which she kisses Odysseus instead, upsetting Alex. The two arrive at Eppermint's house where the ninja unsuccessfully attempts to kill him. Alex realizes that the ninja is actually Taiko Nakamura. When Alex refuses to help him, Nakamura attempts to murder Sean after Alex wished he was dead earlier. This makes Alex seem insane, causing him to be imprisoned in an asylum. There, the two strike a deal to bring down Eppermint without killing him. Visiting Stewart, he gives them the number of a drug dealer who gives them a kilogram of cocaine. Alex inserts the cocaine into Nakamura’s body, intending to frame Eppermint for possession of illegal drugs, and follows Eppermint to the airport where Alex and Nakamura emotionally bid farewell. As Eppermint arrives in Thailand, Nakamura jumps onto him. Police subsequently find Eppermint carrying the cocaine-stuffed doll. Nakamura’s spirit leaves the ninja doll and Eppermint is promptly arrested.

Back in Denmark, Alex finds out that before departing, Nakamura sent Jessica a voicemail using his voice, apologizing to her and the two, and they start a romantic relationship. That night, Alex watches news about street criminals and, inspired by Nakamura, becomes a vigilante, dedicated to protecting Albertslund.

== Cast ==
Cast
Role	Danish	English
Alex Stenstrøm (Aske Stenstrøm)	Alfred Bjerre Larsen	
Alex Stenstrøm (Aske Stenstrøm)	Alfred Bjerre Larsen	Cameron Simpson
Jessica Eppermynt (Jessica Eberfrö)	Emma Sehested Høeg	
Jessica Eppermynt (Jessica Eberfrö)	Emma Sehested Høeg	Ava Connolly
Taiko Nakamura / Checkered Ninja (Ternet Ninja)	Anders Matthesen	
Taiko Nakamura / Checkered Ninja (Ternet Ninja)	Anders Matthesen	Luke Griffin
John (Jørn)	Anders Matthesen	Luke Griffin
Philip Eppermint (Phillip Eberfrø)	Anders Matthesen	Luke Griffin
Tina (Mie)	Anders Matthesen	Luke Griffin
Gina (Fie)	Anders Matthesen	Luke Griffin
Sirena Stenstrøm (Sirene Stenstrøm)	Anders Matthesen	Doireann Ní Chorragáin
Stewart Stardust	Anders Matthesen	Michael Glenn Murphy Paul Tylak (singing voice)
Sean (Sune)	Anders Matthesen	Paul Tylak
Glenn	Anders Matthesen	Paul Tylak
Jasper (Jeppe)	Anders Matthesen	Paul Tylak
Hugin	Anders Matthesen	Paul Tylak
Principal	Anders Matthesen	Paul Tylak
Security guard	Anders Matthesen	Paul Tylak
Odysseus	Anders Matthesen	Emmet Ryan
Munin	Anders Matthesen	Emmet Ryan
Scooter Scotty (Scooter Schrødder)	Anders Matthesen	Brendan McDonald
Eppermynt (Eberfrö)	Anders Matthesen	Brendan McDonald
Siberius	Anders Matthesen	Brendan McDonald
Carsten	Anders Matthesen	Brendan McDonald
Dr. Warming	Anders Matthesen	Brendan McDonald
Perry (Pelle)	Anders Matthesen	Eoin Daly
Boys	Anders Matthesen	Eoin Daly

== Reception ==
Jordan Mintzner of The Hollywood Reporter gave the film a positive review, summarizing it as "Clever and a bit crude". The film also sold over 1 million tickets in Denmark, making it the highest-grossing Danish film since Op på fars hat from 1986.

The film won three Robert Awards, for Best Children's Film, Best Adapted Screenplay, and Best Original Song ("Skubber det sne"). It was also nominated for the Bodil Award for Best Danish Film.

== Music ==
Checkered Ninja (Ternet Ninja)

Soundtrack album by Anders Matthesen
- Released: 2019
- Recorded: 2018
- Genre: Hip hop
- Label: Sony Music
- Producer: Kewan Padré

Singles from Checkered Ninja
- 1. "Pesto"; 2. "Pushin that Snow (Skubber det sne)"

Music for the film was composed by Christian Vinten, while six original songs were written and performed by Anders Matthesen and produced by Kewan Padré. The singles "Pesto" and "Pushing the Snow" ("Skubber det sne") was also released independently. The English versions of the songs were sung by the Danish hip-hop singer Waqas Qadri ("Taiko Nakamura", "Pesto" and "Pushing That Snow") and songwriter Jimmy Antony ("Jessica" and "Alex’s Goodbye") according to the credits of the English dub version of the film. Paul Tylak, who voices Stewart in the second movie (replacing Michael Glenn Murphy) provides the English vocals to "The Best in the World" ("Verdens bedste").

No.	Title	Length
1.	"Checkered Ninja’s Theme (Ternet Tema)"	1:37
2.	"Jessica (Jessica's song)"	1:00
3.	"Pesto"	2:56
4.	"Taiko Nakamura"	3:36
5.	"The Best in the World (Verdens bedste)"	1:23
6.	"Pushing That Snow (Skubber det sne)"	2:54
7.	"Alex’s Goodbye (Askes farvelsang)"	1:25

== Sequels ==
A sequel, Checkered Ninja 2 (Ternet Ninja 2) was announced, based on Anders Matthesen's sequel to the original novel which was published in 2019. The film was released on August 19, 2021, and saw Anders Matthesen and Thorbjørn Christoffersen return as directors. The film went into production in late 2019 with a budget of 8,000,000 DKK (1,319,108.80 US dollars) provided by the Danish Film Institute.

A third film, Checkered Ninja 3 (Ternet Ninja 3) was announced in 2023 with Anders Matthesen and Thorbjørn Christoffersen returning as directors and Trine Heidegaard and Anders Mastrup returning as producers. The film was released in Denmark on August 21, 2025.
