= Gule ærter =

Gule ærter may refer to:

- A Danish dish of pea soup
- A song by De Nattergale
