= Benedikte Hansen =

Danish actress (born 1958)

- Born: 24 September 1958 (age 67)
- Education: Denmark's Statens Teaterskole
- Occupation: actress
- Known for: her role as Hanne Holm in the television series Borgen
- Notable work: see Performances
- Spouse(s): Gerz Feigenberg (m. 1983; div. 1993), Laws Michael Christiansen (div)
- Partner: Viggo Sommer (ended 2017)

Benedikte Hansen (born 24 September 1958) is a Danish actress, best known for her role as Hanne Holm in the television series Borgen.

== Biography ==
Hansen was born on 24 September 1958, to Flemming Hansen (died 2003) and his wife Aase Riegels Borch. She trained as an actress at Denmark's Statens Teaterskole, and has appeared on stage at the Royal Danish Theatre, Copenhagen.

From 1983 to 1993, she was married to actor and director Gerz Feigenberg; the marriage ended in divorce. She subsequently married Laws Michael Christiansen; that marriage also ended in divorce. She subsequently had a relationship with actor Viggo Sommer, which ended amicably in 2017. Following their break-up, Sommer said that the main problem was that "Benner", as he called Hansen, was living in Copenhagen while he was living in Aarhus.

In 2013, she played her first major English-language screen role when she appeared as the Baroness in a new BBC adaptation of The Lady Vanishes. In 2016, she won the Reumert Award for Best Actress.

== Performances ==
=== Theatre ===
- My Fair Lady (1986)
- Mourning Becomes Electra (1991)
- Kjartan and Gudrun (1993)
- Antony and Cleopatra (2001)

=== Television ===
- Gøngehøvdingen (1992)
- Bryggeren (1997)
- Unit 1 (2000–2004)
- Forestillinger (2007)
- Album (2008)
- The Killing II (2009)
- Borgen (2010–2013)
- Above Suspicion: Deadly Intent (2011)
- The Lady Vanishes (2013)
- Tvillingerne & Julemanden (2013)
- Badehotellet (2014–2016)
- Tomgang (2015)

=== Films ===
- Baby Doll (1988)
- Daisy Diamond (2007)
- Denmark (2019)
