= Checkered Ninja 2 =

2021 Danish animated film

- Release poster
- Danish: Ternet Ninja 2
- English: Checkered Ninja 2
- Directed by: Thorbjørn Christoffersen; Anders Matthesen
- Screenplay by: Anders Matthesen
- Based on: Checkered Ninja 2 by Anders Matthesen
- Produced by: Anders Mastrup; Trine Heidegaard; Cemille Matthesen
- Starring: Louis Næss-Schmidt; Emma Sehested Høeg; Anders Matthesen
- Cinematography: Niels Grønlykke
- Edited by: Kristian Håskjold
- Music by: Christian Vinten
- Production companies: A. Film; Pop Up Production; Sudoku ApS
- Distributed by: Nordisk Film (Scandinavia); LevelK (rest of the world)
- Release date: 19 August 2021 (Denmark)
- Running time: 86 min.
- Country: Denmark
- Languages: Danish; English
- Box office: $1,351,199

Checkered Ninja 2 (Danish: Ternet Ninja 2) is a 2021 Danish adult animated urban fantasy action comedy film directed by Anders Matthesen and Thorbjønrn Christoffersen. It is the sequel to Checkered Ninja.

The film was released on August 19, 2021, to positive response and box office success.

The film was dubbed to English in 2022, with an Irish cast by Moetion Films who also dubbed the previous film to English as with the international sales of the film being handled by LevelK Film.

== Plot ==
Some time after framing Phillip Eppermint for cocaine possession, (Note: As depicted in Checkered Ninja (2018)) Alex Stenstrøm becomes a vigilante, securing his neighbourhood in Albertslund, Copenhagen. Alex's stepfather, John, has earned 150,000 kr. from a digestion app, which he decides to spend on Alex's family's vacation. Meanwhile, Alex had been less in touch with his girlfriend Jessica, who prefers to party with older kids.

On Alex’s way home, a lightning bolt strikes a hedgehog, possessing it with the spirit of Taiko Nakamura. Nakamura informs Alex that Eppermint is released from his prison in Thailand the following week due to lack of evidence, as his corrupt lawyer, Jimmy Wonta Gana, destroyed the previous ninja doll containing the cocaine and killed the child labour factory owner to retrieve the list of children who witnessed Eppermint murder Quang, plotting to eliminate every witness and prevent his arrest. This prompts Alex to convince his mother, Sirena, to go back to Thailand, also to make Nakamura a new doll body. Nakamura possesses the newly made ninja doll body and is angered by its feminine appearance.

In Bangkok, Alex and Nakamura sneak away to the prison just in time to see Eppermint's release. They follow him and Jimmy to a cafe where they overhear them discussing a meet up that night at the Lucky Fucky Club, a strip club Jimmy operates, to give Eppermint the list of children and their locations. Alex’s friend Odysseus informs Alex that Jessica had been two-timing with Marco. That night, Alex gets the family to eat at the restaurant located across the club and sneaks off. Jessica breaks up with Alex, not seeing him as the “bad boy” type.

In the club, Jimmy gives Eppermint the list; they find Alex whom Eppermint recognises from the cafe and takes off with the list. Nakamura abandons Alex to retrieve the list but fails. As Alex is about to be tortured by Jimmy, Stewart Stardust, who is on shore leave, rescues him. Alex takes Stewart to the family to John's dismay. Earlier on, Alex hears the first name on the list of children: a girl named Honey Bee who lives on an island near Bangkok called Koh Ho-Ann, planning to take John away from Stewart. The family board the ferry next morning, though Stewart tags along with one ticket left, apparently also preventing Eppermint from reaching the island. Arriving in Koh Ho-Ann, Alex fails to search for Honey Bee. He meets a man named Jasper, a diving centre owner who is Eppermint’s interpreter who witnessed Quang’s murder. Jasper arranges to meet up with Alex again when he finds Honey Bee. Returning to his cabin, Sean catches Alex and Nakamura conversing. Instead of snitching, Sean offers to help and Alex asks him to accompany them during their meeting with Jasper.

At the diving centre, Alex and Nakamura are ambushed by Eppermint and Jimmy. Jimmy traps Alex, Nakamura and Jasper in the storage room and puts a fuel tank near a boiler to blow up the diving centre. Sean saves the three before the diving centre explodes, pursuing Eppermint and Jimmy who are heading to the restaurant where Honey Bee lives. Arriving at the restaurant, Alex and Sean distract Eppermint but Jimmy manages to kidnap Honey Bee. Honey Bee manages to run into a shed of cobras with Alex and Eppermint following whilst Sean and Nakamura fight Jimmy. In the shed, Eppermint corners Alex and Honey Bee but is distracted by Sean, allowing Alex to kick the gun out of Eppermint's hands. Eppermint attempts to strangle Alex but is beaten by Honey Bee before falling into the cage of cobras.

Sean reveals that he live-streamed Alex fighting Eppermint on the Internet, exposing his true nature, and Alex dumps Jessica who witnessed the stream, learning to be himself. Afterward, Alex and his family are treated to a dinner with Honey Bee and her family for saving her. Alex finds out that Nakamura has not left his previous body. He asks to stay with Alex for a while as the two have become close over time. Alex obliges, presenting Nakamura with a newer doll.

== Cast ==
Cast
Role	Danish	English
Alex Stenstrøm (Aske Stenstrøm)	Louis Næss-Schmidt	
Alex Stenstrøm (Aske Stenstrøm)	Louis Næss-Schmidt	Matthew Whelan
Jessica Eppermynt (Jessica Eberfrö)	Emma Sehested Høeg	
Jessica Eppermynt (Jessica Eberfrö)	Emma Sehested Høeg	Ava Connolly
Checkered Ninja/Taiko Nakamura (Ternet Ninja)	Anders Matthesen	
Checkered Ninja/Taiko Nakamura (Ternet Ninja)	Anders Matthesen	Luke Griffin
John (Jørn)	Anders Matthesen	Luke Griffin
Philip Eppermint (Phillip Eberfrø)	Anders Matthesen	Luke Griffin
Tina (Mie)	Anders Matthesen	Luke Griffin
Gina (Fie)	Anders Matthesen	Luke Griffin
Sean (Sune)	Anders Matthesen	Paul Tylak
Stewart Stardust	Anders Matthesen	Paul Tylak
Jasper (Jeppe)	Anders Matthesen	Paul Tylak
Sirena Stenstrøm (Sirene Stenstrøm)	Anders Matthesen	Doireann Ní Chorragáin
Jimmy Nokken Gahn (Carsten Nokken Gahn)	Anders Matthesen	Jonathan Ryan
Odysseus	Anders Matthesen	Emmet Ryan
Eppermynt (Eberfrö)	Anders Matthesen	Brendan McDonald
Parkour Coach	Anders Matthesen	Brendan McDonald
Perry (Pelle)	Anders Matthesen	Eoin Daly
Honey Bee	Anders Matthesen	Siun Alexander

== Reception ==
Dagbladet Information stated that the sequel "live(d) up to its predecessor, both in terms of roughness, tension and message" Ekkofilm also praised the film. "Anders Matthesen is not afraid to place scenes of interrogatory and shemales into an animated family film" noted B.T.

== Music ==
Checkered Ninja 2 (Ternet Ninja 2)

Soundtrack album by Anders Matthesen
- Released: 2021
- Genre: Hip hop
- Label: Sony Music
- Producer: Christian Vinten

Singles from Checkered Ninja 2
- 1. "Bad Boy"

Music for the film was composed by Christian Vinten who composed the score from the first movie, while eight original songs were written and performed by Anders Matthesen. The single "Bad Boy" was also released independently. According to the English credits, the English versions of the songs were sung by Gisli Gislason ("Next Level" and "Honey Bee") and songwriter Jimmy Antony ("Three Dots" and "Away We Go"). The latter performed some of the songs from the first movie. Paul Tylak provides the English vocals for Stewart Stardust in the song "Cook It Up Ála Thai". Tylak previously provided the singing vocals for the character in the first film.

No.	Title	Length
1.	"Next Level"	1:37
2.	"Three Dots (Tre Prikker)"	2:41
3.	"Bad Boy"	2:56
4.	"Gluten Free (Glutenfri)"	4:27
5.	"Away We Go (På Vej)"	2:17
6.	"Halli Halløj 2,0"	2:32
7.	"Honey Bee"	1:05
8.	"Cook It Up Ála Thai (Gi’ Den Lidt Thai)"	3:29

== Sequel ==
A third film, Checkered Ninja 3 (Ternet Ninja 3) was announced in 2023 with Anders Matthesen and Thorbjørn Christoffersen returning as directors and Trine Heidegaard and Anders Mastrup returning as producers. The film was released in Denmark on August 21, 2025.
