= The Joulukalenteri =

Finnish television series

- Written by: De Nattergale
- Directed by: Jukka Virtanen
- Starring: Seppo Korjus; Kari Lehtomäki; Raimo Smedberg; Jukka Virtanen
- Countries of origin: Finland; Denmark
- Original languages: Finnish; English
- No. of episodes: 24

Production
- Producers: Hans-Erik Saks; Pirkko Leisti
- Cinematography: Steen Linde; Rene Schmidt; Carsten Knudsen
- Running time: 15 minutes
- Production companies: Saks Film og Tv; MTV Oy

Original release
- Network: MTV3
- Release: 1 December – 24 December 1997

The Joulukalenteri (combination of English word "The" and Finnish word for "Christmas Calendar") is a 1997 Finnish television miniseries produced by MTV3 that has been broadcast again several times. (Note: In 1998, 2007, 2017, 2018, 2019, 2022, 2023 and 2024.) It was based on the Danish series The Julekalender from 1991. A Norwegian version was made in 1994.

The series came out in December 1997 with one episode per day, concluding on Christmas Eve. The original concept and script of the series, as well as its numerous songs came from the Danish trio of De Nattergale (Carsten Knudsen, Uffe Rørbæk Madsen and Viggo Sommer). The Finnish adaptation was directed by Jukka Virtanen and starred Seppo Korjus, Kari Lehtomäki, Raimo Smedberg and Jukka Virtanen.

== Plot summary ==
In Alaska (referred to as "a faraway place at the edge of the world") the old elf Iki-Iäkäs is dying, because the musicbox which plays his life's melody is about to stop. Iki-Iäkäs sends three elves, Toivo, Kauko and Hande, to Finland (whence the elves were driven away by the evil and greedy Näsä) to find the key to the music box so that it can be rewound.

After forgetting to fill the tank of their aeroplane, the elves crash into the woods. They manage to steal fuel from a nearby farm, the occupants of which are completely unaware of the elves' presence and the true intentions of their bizarre guest Pentti. Pentti is, in actuality, a Näsä sent to steal the elves' Book of Knowledge which holds the answer to every question. Despite getting the gas, they can't leave, because the propeller was twisted in the crash and so Kauko, an elf of an established carpenter family, begins to make a new one out of wood.

As a comedic touch, the three elves speak in a mixture of Finnish and English. This is mostly Finnish but (almost) every line contains a few words or phrases replaced by English in random places.
