= Checkered Ninja 3 =

2025 Danish film

- Danish: Ternet Ninja 3
- English: Checkered Ninja 3
- Directed by: Anders Matthesen; Thorbjørn Christoffersen
- Written by: Anders Matthensen
- Based on: Checkered Ninja 3 by Anders Matthesen
- Produced by: Trine Heidegaard; Anders Mastrup
- Production company: A. Film
- Release date: 21 August 2025 (Denmark)
- Running time: 88 min.
- Country: Denmark
- Languages: Danish; English

Checkered Ninja 3 (Danish: Ternet Ninja 3) is a 2025 Danish adult animated urban fantasy action comedy film directed by Anders Matthesen and Thorbjørn Christoffersen, and based on Matthesen's book of the same name, which was published in 2024.

It is the sequel to Checkered Ninja 2 and the third and final film in the trilogy. It was released on August 21, 2025, and received positive reviews.

The two previous Checkered Ninja films are among the most popular Danish films in recent times, with approximately 900,000 tickets sold each.

== Plot ==
One year after defeating Phillip Eppermint in Thailand, (Note: As depicted in Checkered Ninja 2 (2021)) Alex Stenstrøm has grown tired of ninja training with Taiko Nakamura and spends his time at the local youth centre. To get Nakamura off his back, Alex allows him to come to the youth centre with him one evening. There, his friend Odysseus introduces him to a new girl, Emily. Outside, Nakamura witnesses an apparent drug deal involving Marco, Alex's ex-girlfriend Jessica Eppermynt's new boyfriend, and slashes his tyres, framing Alex for it. The two fight with Alex winning, but this gets him suspended from the youth centre for four weeks by Arne, its owner and school music teacher.

That night, Alex's shed is set on fire and he witnesses a mysterious black car leaving his street. The next day, Alex shows Emily around the neighbourhood and the two bond. After Emily goes home, Alex is chased by the mysterious black car. Concluding Marco is behind the recent attacks, Nakamura scares him off by 'soul-jumping' into a school mascot suit. At Alex's great-grandmother's funeral, Nakamura sees what appears to be Marco and ends up in the coffin. Alex runs into Emily and they follow the hearse to the crematorium on her bike. After saving Nakamura, Emily discovers his existence. At home, Jessica reveals she broke up with Marco after realising that she truly loves Alex. However, she becomes furious after seeing Emily, thinking Alex has moved on. Alex receives a threat from Marco, telling him to meet him at a building site. Alex fights off what appears to be Marco wearing a helmet and Emily ends up getting hospitalized after apparently being injured. Enraged, Alex goes to Marco's neighbourhood and beats him up. Arriving home, he runs into the black car again and confronts the driver; a man named Lionel Ollipop who claims to be Alex's biological father.

The next day, Marco and his mother visit Alex's house, demanding an apology and reveals that Marco, despite having anger issues, is actually innocent and the "drugs" he's been selling have actually been Pokémon cards. Alex's mother Sirena reveals that she accidentally burnt down the shed after trying to cook meat, as she has decided to quit her vegan lifestyle. Alex, blaming Nakamura for deceiving him, sneaks out to meet with Emily at the hospital. Emily tells him that Jessica, who has been arrested, has been masterminding the recent events. A disheartened Nakamura decides to finally pass on to the afterlife.

Alex and Emily go to Lionel's cabin for dinner. His stepbrother Sean (who is also aware of Nakamura's existence) unwittingly brings Taiko back and Jessica, who has been exonerated, finds out that Emily, who is Phillip Eppermint's daughter and had escaped from juvenile detention, is the true mastermind. Emily attacks Alex, who discovers that Lionel is actually a disfigured Phillip, wanting revenge on Alex for ruining his life and nearly killing him.

Tracking down Phillip's cabin, Nakamura, Sean and Jessica come to Alex's aid but are taken down by Emily and Phillip. Alex tries to convince Emily that Phillip never actually cares about her, but she refuses to listen until she discovers Phillip planning to frame her for Alex, Sean and Jessica's murder. After he knocks out Emily, Phillip lights the cabin on fire and leaves them all for dead. Nakamura conquers his pyrophobia and possesses Phillip into returning to free the kids. As Alex tries to save Emily, he stops to help Nakamura. Phillip tries to get Emily to help him, but Emily disowns Philip, leaving him to die in the blaze. She then saves Alex as the cabin burns down. Nakamura's spirit appears and silently bids farewell to Alex before moving on to the afterlife.

Some time later, Emily is back in juvenile detention, but is now leading a happier life. Alex's family and friends gather for a barbecue where Sirena finally reveals the identity of Alex's real father: Arne. Accepting him and his stepfather John as both of his fathers, Alex and Jessica resume their relationship and dance along to Arne's song about family.

== Cast ==
Role	Danish	English
Alex Stenstrøm (Aske Stenstrøm)	Louis Næss-Schmidt	Matthew Whelan
Taiko Nakamura/Checkered Ninja (Ternet Ninja)	Anders Matthesen	Luke Griffin
Emily Eppermint	Flora Ofelia Hofman Lindahl	Emma Jenkins
Jessica Eppermynt	Emma Sehested Høeg	Lucy Carolan
Phillip Eppermint (Phillip Eberfrø)	Anders Mattesen	Luke Griffin Brendan McDonald (as Lionel Ollipop)
Marco	Anders Matthesen	Cameron Simpson
Sean	Anders Matthesen	Paul Tylak
Sirena Stenstrøm (Sirene Stenstrøm)	Anders Matthesen	Doireann Ní Chorragáin
John (Jørn)	Anders Matthesen	Luke Griffin
Steward Stardust	Anders Matthesen	Paul Tylak
Odysseus	Anders Matthesen	Emmett Ryan
Tina (Mie)	Anders Matthesen	Luke Griffin
Gina (Fie)	Anders Matthesen	Luke Griffin

== Production ==
The YouTube channel Spørge Jørgen, run by Jørgen Bjørn Hansen and Kristina Iskov, followed the development of Checkered Ninja 3 for seven months and visited A. Film to speak with Anders Matthesen and the animators about the film. In addition, Spørge Jørgen also visited Nordisk Film, where the dialogue was recorded. Art Director Kresten Vestbjerg Andersen uploaded a video showing the film's character models on his YouTube channel in December 2025.

== Reception ==
=== Box office ===
According to a tally in mid-December 2025, the film had reached nearly 775,000 tickets sold and was at that time the highest-grossing film in Danish cinemas that year.

=== Reviews ===
Filmmagasinet Ekko awarded the film four out of six stars. Reviewer Frederik Hoff argued that Danes were fortunate that Checkered Ninja, as the most successful business venture in Danish cinema, was at the same time an original and deeply personal story, even if some of the film's jokes felt somewhat dated and not all of its voice performances were equally convincing. Hoff was also highly impressed by the animation, which he considered the highest quality yet seen in Denmark and at times astonishingly photorealistic.

In Politiken, Joakim Grundahl awarded the entire trilogy the maximum six hearts, arguing that the three films together formed a perfectly shaped coming-of-age story and stood as a unique masterpiece in Danish film history because of their complex characters, provocative humor, and sensitive tenderness.

Berlingske reviewer Birgitte Borup awarded five stars and wrote that the film was simultaneously for children and adults, a coming-of-age story, a critique of the spirit of the age, a thriller, and at times a laugh-out-loud comedy.

In Information, Lone Nikolajsen argued that the success of the three Checkered Ninja films was well deserved and encouraging. She praised the concluding film for its fast pace and abundance of ideas, for having a story that made sense within its own absurd framework, and for an ending frightening enough to make a 43-year-old film critic shiver. She also noted that the film spent most of its time heading in unexpected directions rather than predictable ones. Nikolajsen further praised the film for its accurate depiction of the Vestegnen environment in which Aske and his blended family live, a setting otherwise underrepresented in Danish children's fiction.
