= Toscana (film) =

2022 Danish romantic comedy-drama film

- Poster
- Directed by: Mehdi Avaz
- Written by: Mehdi Avaz
- Starring: Anders Matthesen; Cristiana Dell'Anna; Andrea Bosca; Ghita Nørby; Sebastian Jessen; Ari Alexander; Christopher Nissen
- Production companies: Rocket Road Pictures; SF Studios
- Distributed by: Netflix
- Release date: 18 May 2022
- Running time: 90 minutes
- Country: Denmark

Toscana is a 2022 Danish romantic comedy drama film, written and directed by Mehdi Avaz and starring Anders Matthesen as the fictional Michelin cook Theo Dahl. The film was released on 18 May 2022 exclusively on Netflix as the first Danish Netflix Original feature film. It was largely received negatively by critics—who especially criticised its predictability and script—but it was a success among viewers, becoming the fifth-most watched film worldwide on Netflix during its first week.

== Cast ==
- Anders Matthesen: Theo Dahl
  - Kaiser Houborg: young Theo
- Cristiana Dell'Anna: Sophia
  - Elva Garcia Seidler: young Sophia
- Andrea Bosca: Pino
- Ghita Nørby: Inge
- Sebastian Jessen: Zeuten
- Ari Alexander: Lai
- Christopher Nissen: Svend
- Karoline Brygmann: Melanie
- Lærke Winther: Merle, Theo's ex-wife
- Christoffer Jindyl: Vincent
- Pino Ammendola: Lucca
- Sergio Pantani: præst
- Renzo Del Lungo: Livio Ricci
- Caroline Dahm: Camilla

Source: Netflix

== Production ==
The filming of Toscana started on 5 October 2020 in Toscana, Italy, and lasted 19 days. The film was produced by Rocket Road Pictures, Mehdi Avaz' film company, and the budget consisted of Avaz's own money. It was originally scheduled for a December 2021 release, but due to the coronavirus pandemic, it was postponed. After the film had been produced, Netflix purchased the distribution rights, canceled the theatrical release, and set it for an 18 May 2022 release on their platform.

== Release ==
Toscana was released on 18 May 2022 on Netflix as the first Danish Netflix Original feature film.

== Reception ==
The film became a large success among viewers. In the first week after its release, it had amassed 14.8 million hours watched, equivalent to around 10 million viewings, and was the most watched non-English-language film and fifth-most watched film overall on Netflix globally.

=== Critical response ===
On the review aggregator website Rotten Tomatoes, 67% of 6 critics' reviews are positive, with an average rating of 6/10.

Toscana was negatively received by Danish critics. In a review before the public release, Filmmagasinet Ekko gave the film 2 out of 6 stars, criticising the lack of realism and writing that "Toscana tastes like Kollision [another film directed by Mehdi Avaz] in its paper-thin character drawing and clumsy script". Shortly after its release, Soundvenue likewise gave it 2 out of 6 stars, criticizing in particular its predictability and, as Ekko did, the script; most of all, according to the reviewer, Toscana felt like a "waste of Anders Matthesen's talent". Berlingske was a little more positive with a rating of 3 out of 6 stars, but also criticized the film's predictability and lack of realism, calling it "not just a film that embraces clichés, it invites clichés home and makes them breakfast the next day". However, the reviewer added that "it [is] not without charm", and praised Anders Matthesen's acting.

An English-language review was more positive. The Los Angeles Times also mentioned the film's predictability, but concluded that "the stars are likable and — as is usually the case with movies like these — there's some real satisfaction in seeing how all the dots get connected".
