= Danglish =

Mixture of Danish and English languages

Danglish is a form of speech or writing that combines elements of Danish and English. The word Danglish is a portmanteau of Danish and English and has been in use since 1990. A variant form is Denglish, recorded since 2006. The term is used in Denmark to refer to the use of English or pseudo-English vocabulary in Danish. While it has been argued that the influx of English words, similar to the import of Latin and French words in the past, makes the language more expressive, it remains controversial in many sectors of society, notably with older people, who are often less accustomed to English terms.

"Danglish" is also used as a pejorative referring to the use of poor and/or clumsy English by Danes.

== Danification of English words ==
Danglish words often receive standard Danish endings and prefixes; in other words, they are conjugated or declined in the same manner as Danish words. The following are examples of sentences featuring Danified English words; the correct terms in Danish are also included as well:

- "Jeg blev nødt til at genstarte/reboote computeren, fordi programmet crashede. (I had to reboot the computer because the software crashed.)
- "Har du allerede hentet/downloadet den nyeste version?" (Have you already downloaded the newest version?)

== Twisting of Danish idioms and grammar rules ==
The adaptation also takes the other route, where literal translations of popular English expressions slowly but insistently replace the correct Danish words and idioms. Widespread examples of this evolution include but are not limited to:

- at handle på noget (to act on something/take action. Correct term: at skride til handling)
- tager ikke nej for et svar (to not take "no" for an answer. Correct term: tager ikke nej for et nej)
- at få alting frem i det åbne (to get everything out in the open. Correct term: at få alting frem)
- at svare telefonen (to answer the telephone. Correct term: at tage telefonen)
- at spørge [om] et spørgsmål (to ask [about] a question. Correct term: at stille et spørgsmål)

These phrasings may have originated from (subtitled) English-language films and television shows translated into Danish, but are also used in everyday language.

== Anglicisation of Danish sentences ==
Although large majority of Danes are familiar with English as a second language, non-idiomatic sentences can still result from overly literal translations:

- "I am at the beginning of my period." ("My term in office has just begun." – Falsely attributed to Helle Degn, former Minister of Development Cooperation. Started as an internal, intentional joke at a Christmas party in Danida in 1993.)
- "Screw down a little bit the expectations" ("Lower your expectations" – Richard Møller Nielsen, National Football Manager)
- "The prick over the I" (Danish saying meaning "the finishing touch", or "dot the i's and cross the t's" – Jytte Hilden, Former Minister of Culture)
- "Can I borrow the toilet?" ("May I use the toilet?")

== Examples of common mistakes made by native Danish speakers when speaking English ==
Grammar mistakes such as:

- Omitting the article "the", because its Danish equivalents ("den", "det", "de") are used less often than in English. For example, "Train is delayed" or "Restaurant is booked".

Words with multiple meanings in one of the languages:

- Confusing "fun" with "funny." This is due to the Danish word "sjov" meaning having both meanings. ("We had a very funny time.")
- Mixing up "lose" and "drop". This is due to the Danish word "tabe" meaning having both meanings. ("I was sorry to drop so much money in the stock market, but at least I dropped a lot of weight worrying about it.")
- Confusing "prize" and "price" (both called "pris" in Danish)

False friend mistakes such as: (see also The dictionary definition of Appendix:False friends between Danish and English at Wiktionary)

- Mistranslating "eventuelt" (possibly) as "eventually" and "aktuelt" (current/currently) as "actually."
- Writing "consumer" instead of "customer."

== Non-translation ==
Several schools have lately changed their names to become more internationally recognized. "Handelshøjskolen i København" is now known as "Copenhagen Business School" or "CBS". Of the three music conservatories offering classical music programs, the English names of Royal Academy of Music, Aarhus/Aalborg and Danish National Academy of Music deviate from their original Danish names that show strong geographical emphasis, "Det Jyske Musikkonservatorium (DJM)" and "Syddansk Musikkonservatorium (SDMK)", which are translated as "The Jutlandic Music Conservatory" and "Southern Denmark Music Conservatory" respectively. Their English acronyms "RAMA" and "DNA of Music" are also employed in such informal settings as social media, for instance, the former's annual "RAMA Festival" and the latter's Facebook page URL.

Many English-language films such as Armageddon, Toy Story or Ice Age, do not translate their titles into Danish, even if the films themselves are otherwise fully translated. Menus of many global fast food chains also usually go partly or completely untranslated, such as "Double Whopper,"

== See also ==
- The Julekalender—certain characters in said television series speak entirely in Danglish.
- Denglisch
- Dunglish
