= Dunglish =

Errors common in Dutch English

Dunglish (portmanteau of Dutch and English; in Dutch: steenkolenengels [ˈsteːŋ.koː.lə(n)ˌɛ.ŋəls], literally: "coal-English") is a popular term for an English spoken with a mixture of Dutch. It is often viewed pejoratively due to certain typical mistakes that native Dutch speakers, particularly those from the Netherlands, make when speaking English. The term is first recorded in 1965, with other colloquial portmanteau words including Denglish (recorded from 1983), Dutchlish (1986), and Dinglish (2003).

English instruction in the Netherlands and Flanders, the Dutch-speaking part of Belgium, begins at an early age and continues as a basic school subject thereafter, with a number of university courses and programs entirely in English. English-language films are usually subtitled rather than dubbed. This education and exposure results in a relatively high general competence in English, yet mistakes are made.

The Dutch word for the poorest form of Dunglish, steenkolenengels ("Coal English"), dates to about 1900 when Dutch port workers used a rudimentary form of English to communicate with the crews of English coal ships.

Errors occur mainly in pronunciation, word order, stress laid on the wrong syllables, and the meaning of words, so-called false friends and false cognates. Former Dutch ambassador and prime minister Dries van Agt supposedly once said "I can stand my little man" (translation of ik kan mijn mannetje staan, a Dutch idiom meaning roughly "I can stand up for myself"). The former leader of the Dutch Liberal Party (VVD), Frits Bolkestein, repeatedly referred to economic prospects as "golden showers", unaware of the term's sexual connotation.

== Incorrect meaning of words ==
Errors often occur because of the false friend or false cognate possibility: words are incorrectly translated for understandable reasons. Examples are:

- Former prime minister Joop den Uyl once remarked that "the Dutch are a nation of undertakers". The Dutch verb ondernemen is literally the English to undertake (as onder is under, and nemen is take). The noun ondernemer is thus literally undertaker (which usually refers to a mortician); however, Den Uyl's intended English meaning was instead entrepreneur. (Dutch uses the more specific begrafenisondernemer for a funeral director.)
- Former prime minister Pieter Sjoerds Gerbrandy had a meeting with Winston Churchill in London. Gerbrandy entered the room and shook Churchill's hand, saying: "Good-day!" Churchill responded: "This is the shortest meeting I have ever had". Gerbrandy had looked up the English translation of goedendag, which in Dutch is often used as a formal greeting, yet "good day" is most often used as valediction in Britain (as opposed to "good morning" or "good afternoon").
- Dutch actueel means "current" (whereas actual in English means "precise" or "genuine"). A Dutch person unfamiliar with the English word might therefore be confused if they were asked about the "actual time" an event or appointment is supposed to start, or might misuse the word themselves.
- The Dutch verb solliciteren means "apply for a job", while English solicit (and soliciting or solicited) can refer to prostitutes approaching clients; this can lead to an embarrassing situation if a native Dutch speaker states, in an English language context that they are soliciting or would like to solicit.
- The word eventueel in Dutch means potentially and not eventually, which is uiteindelijk in Dutch. This mistake caused a row between the Scottish and Belgian football associations when the Belgian football association invited delegates from various associations over for the "eventual qualification of the Belgian national football team" before the play-offs against Scotland started. While the Scottish federation accused the Belgians of sheer arrogance, the Belgian association had actually meant to hold the event after a "possible" qualification.

== Word order ==
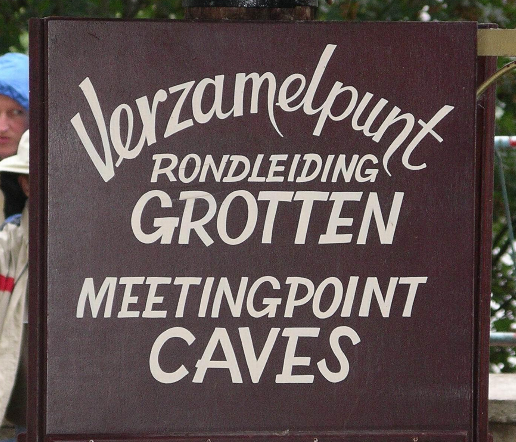
Two typical Dutch mistakes in English – wrong order for noun adjuncts ("meeting point caves" instead of "Meeting point for caves" or "Cave meeting point") and compound nouns written as one word ("meetingpoint")

Some Dutch speakers may use Dutch syntax inappropriately when using English. These errors occur because English and Dutch do not apply exactly the same word order.

Modern English has a subject–verb–object word order, but this is shared only partially by Dutch, which has a verb-second order, causing the subject to follow the verb if another constituent already precedes it; e.g., Hij is daar ("He is there"), but Daar is hij; literally "There is he" (idiomatically, "There he is").

Dutch also places perfect participles towards the end of a clause while the auxiliary remains at the verb-second position, allowing for the two to be separated and for many other elements to stand in between; e.g. Ik heb dat gisteren [meteen na de lunch toen ik aankwam etc.] gedaan; literally "I have that yesterday [immediately after the lunch when I arrived etc.] done".

When asking questions, Dutch speakers may mirror the subject-verb inversion of archaic English grammar (e.g. ”What say you?”, ”What meanest thou?”) rather than using do-support as is preferred in contemporary English (e.g. ”What do you mean?”). This is because Dutch does not use periphrastic do-support, which is a rare feature cross-linguistically, but instead inverts the subject and verb when asking questions (e.g. “Heb jij een fiets?”, literally “have you a bicycle?”), as is common in the Germanic language family.

In English noun adjuncts, such as Schiphol in the phrase 'Schiphol Meeting Point', the modifying noun comes before the other noun. In Dutch this is the reverse, giving rise to errors like "Meeting Point Schiphol".

== Compound nouns written as one word ==
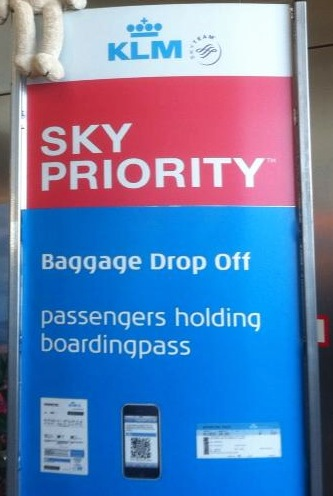
Dutch compound noun error in English "boardingpass" instead of "boarding pass", as seen on KLM sign at Schiphol Airport, 2013

In English, only certain compound nouns (such as "schoolteacher") can be written as one word, whereas in Dutch the default is to write compound nouns as a single word. In some cases the English compound noun spelled as two words has been officially absorbed by the Dutch language as a single loanword – as is the case with creditcard (credit card) and jetlag (jet lag).

== Verb conjugation ==
English and Dutch are both West Germanic languages, with many cognate verbs with identical or nearly identical meanings. This similarity between verbs may cause speakers of Dutch to conjugate English verbs according to Dutch grammar.

- We kissen her. (Dutch kussen means and is cognate with English to kiss. In Dutch grammar, verbs with plural subjects take a form identical to the infinitive, which in most cases has an en suffix.)
- What do you now? for What are you doing right now? (In Dutch, Wat doe je nu?)
- How goes it now? for How are you doing now? (The phrase is used particularly after someone has had a bad spell. A similarly constructed phrase is found in Shakespeare (Othello, Act 4, Scene 3), carrying a slightly different meaning, which underlines the even closer similarities between English and Dutch historically.)

== Errors in pronunciation ==
- Words like third and the are commonly mispronounced by Dutch speakers as turd and duh (cognate to Dutch de), replacing the dental fricative consonants 'th' that are not present in Dutch with dental plosives, the nearest equivalent.
- Most Dutch speakers have trouble distinguishing between bat and bad, bet and bed or between back, bag, beck and beg. This is because Dutch devoices obstruents at the end of a word. Dutch also does not distinguish between [æ] and [ɛ].
- Some pronounce the word idea (in Dutch: idee) without the ending sound, making "Do you have an idea?" and "Do you have an ID?" sound the same.
- Most Dutch speakers do not voice the English v (that is, their vocal cords do not vibrate when they say it). In English, the labiodental fricative is "f" when unvoiced and "v" when voiced. In the modern Northern Standard Dialect of Dutch, "v" and "z" is often devoiced. This is particularly obvious when "v" or "z" begins a word. For example, many Dutch would pronounce video as /ˈfɪdiəʊ/, instead of /ˈvɪdiəʊ/, or van as /fæn/, instead of /væn/, and zee as see.

== Other mistakes ==
- Using "greetings" to close a letter. Caused by the literal translation of the Dutch closing phrase "(met vriendelijke) groeten". In English, a greeting typically refers to the beginning of any type of exchange.
- Using the possessive form without a determiner. For example, "the Lamborghini of Patrick" instead of "Patrick's Lamborghini", or "the computer of her" instead of "her computer".
- Using apostrophes to indicate plural nouns: "car's" instead of "cars".

== Use in media ==
- A 2009 Dutch TV ad by the Eneco utility, promoting wind energy, poked fun at the Dutch people's tendency to speak Dunglish.
- Make that the cat wise, originally started as a Facebook group poking fun at bad English translations by mock translating Dutch sayings, deliberately sticking to Dutch word order and use words that are homonyms in Dutch but not in English, thus creating English sentences that make no sense to native English speakers. The title "Make that the cat wise" is a mock translation of the Dutch saying "Maak dat de kat wijs" (try to convince the cat, i.e. don't try to fool me). The publisher also sells calendars and agendas with this theme.

== Literature ==
Dutch author Maarten H. Rijkens has written two books on the subject for Dutch readers: I always get my sin and We always get our sin too.

== See also ==
- Non-native pronunciations of English
- South African English
- Danglish
- Denglisch
