= Jól á leið til jarðar =

- Opening titles
- Genre: Stop motion children's miniseries Christmas calendar
- Created by: Sigurður Örn Brynjólfsson; Friðrik Erlingsson
- Written by: Friðrik Erlingsson
- Directed by: Sigurður Örn Brynjólfsson
- Starring: Sigurður Sigurjónsson; Laddi; Örn Árnason
- Narrated by: Örn Árnason
- Theme music composer: Sigurður Rúnar Jónsson
- Country of origin: Iceland
- Original language: Icelandic
- No. of episodes: 24

Production
- Cinematography: Urmas Sepp
- Editors: Sigurður Örn Brynjólfsson; Kulli Jaama; Ivar Hansen
- Production company: Siggi Anima Stuudio
- Budget: ISK 11 million

Original release
- Network: Sjónvarpið
- Release: 1 December – 24 December 1994

Related
- Tveir á báti (1992) (previous original production); Hvar er Völundur? (1996) (next original production)

Jól á leið til jarðar (English: Christmas on the Way to Earth) is an Icelandic television series that first aired on Icelandic public television channel Sjónvarpið in December 1994. The series is a part of Jóladagatal Sjónvarpsins, an ongoing series of televised advent calendars. It was created by Sigurður Örn Brynjólfsson and Friðrik Erlingsson, and was the first stop-motion advent calendar on Icelandic television. The show was produced at Nukufilm studios in Tallinn, Estonia.

The show was voiced by actors and comedians Sigurður Sigurjónsson, Laddi and Örn Árnason.

Jól á leið til jarðar was rerun on Sjónvarpið in December 1999 and 2007.

A physical advent calendar containing leads to each episode's plot was published in conjunction with the initial airing of the series.

== Premise ==
Two inexperienced angels from heaven must deliver a casket containing the holiday of Christmas to Earth in time for Christmas Eve, as the evil Öngull attempts to steal the casket, and sink it in the deepest black hole in space.

== See also ==
- List of films about angels
- List of Christmas films
