= Denglisch =

Mixture of German and English languages

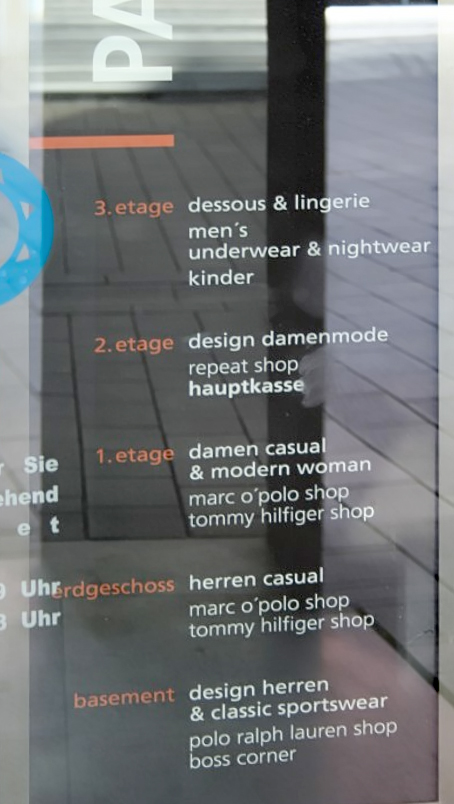
Mixed German, English and French in a German department store

Denglisch (German pronunciation: [ˈdɛŋlɪʃ]) is a term describing code-mixing or code-switching of German and English. The term is first recorded from 1965. The use of Denglisch words within language may also be referred to as Denglicism.

The word has been adopted in English in an anglicized form as Denglish, recorded from 1996.

== Terminology ==
The term is particularly used by language purists in all German-speaking countries to refer to the increasingly strong influx of English or pseudo-English vocabulary (and other features of the language such as grammar and orthography) into German. The standard German reference work Duden defines it as "a pejorative term for German with too many English expressions mixed in."

Other sources use words with aggressive, hostile, or negative connotations to describe it such as "a persistent infiltration", an "invasion", "onslaught", or "attack", or that it is "corrupting the language" or is an "infectious disease".

Other slang terms in German which refer to the same phenomenon include: McDeutsch ("McGerman"), Dummdeutsch ("dumb German"), Dönerdeutsch (kebab German).

In English there are numerous colloquial portmanteau words. One set is based on the word Deutsch. These include (chronologically) Deutschlisch (first recorded in 1970), Deutlish (1977), Deutschlish (1979) and Dinglish (1990). Another set of terms is based on the word German. These include (chronologically) Germenglish (first recorded 1936), Germanglish (1967), Gerglish (1968), Germish (1972), Germlish (1974), Genglish (1977), Ginglish (1989), Germinglish (1996), and Gernglish (1996).

== Criticism ==
Some influence of English on German is expected as part of normal language contact. The term Denglisch refers to abundant or excessive use of anglicisms or pseudo-anglicisms in German.

The introduction of English buzzwords peaked during the 1990s and the early 2000s. Since then, the ubiquity of the practice has made it much less fashionable or prestigious, and several commentators have argued against it. Zeit Online (whose title is itself an example of the prevalence of anglicisms in German IT terminology) criticized the ubiquitous use of English in a 2007 article. Although the article acknowledged the risks of excessive linguistic purism, it condemned the fashion of labeling information desks at train stations, formerly simply known as Auskunft, with the anglicism Service Point. The choice of the pseudo-anglicism Brain up! by then-minister for education Edelgard Bulmahn as a campaign slogan in 2004 was highlighted as an extreme case by Die Zeit. Frankfurter Allgemeine satirized this choice at the time of its introduction, and later wrote that even the English-speaking sphere was mocking "German linguistic submissiveness".

== Forms of influence ==
Words and expressions labeled as Denglisch can come from various sources, including loanwords, calques, anglicisms, pseudo-anglicisms, or adoption of non-native grammar, syntax, or spelling.

=== Loanwords ===
German vocabulary has numerous cases of English loanwords now fully "naturalized" as German words, including full inflection. English had only very limited influence on German before the mid-19th century. Such loanwords as there are mostly concern nautical vocabulary, loaned into Low German (e.g. tank, ultimately from Indo-Aryan; Tanker (tanker (ship)) is early 20th century).

In the 19th century, it was still more common to use loan translation for the vocabulary of industrialisation (Dampfmaschine for "steam engine", Pferdestärke for "horse power", etc.). To some extent, this continued in the early 20th century: Wolkenkratzer for "skyscraper", Kaugummi for "chewing gum", Flutlicht for "flood light", Fernsehen for "television".

English loanwords became more common in the early 20th century. A notable example from this period is Test (ultimately from Old French test "earthen pot"). Test was compatible both with German phonology and orthography so its nature as a loan is not evident.

Early loanwords (19th to early 20th century) often describe garments or foodstuffs: Jumper (19th century), Curry (19th century loan from English, ultimately from Tamil), Pyjama (early 20th century loan from English pyjamas, ultimately from Urdu), Trenchcoat (1920s). Other loanwords are boykottieren "to boycott" (1890s) and Star.

Direct influence of English, especially via US pop culture, became far more pronounced after the end of World War II, with allied-occupied Germany and later by association with 1960s to 1970s US counterculture: Jeep, Quiz, Show, Western, Rock, Hippie, Groupie.

The newest and most prolific wave of anglicisms arose after 1989 with the end of the Cold War and the surge of the "Anglo-Saxon" smack of economic liberalism in continental Europe and the associated business jargon ("CEO" became extremely fashionable in German, replacing traditional terms such as Direktor, Geschäftsführer, Vorsitzender during the 1990s). At the same time, the rapid development of information technology pushed many technical terms from that field into everyday language.

Many of the more recent loans have developed in the spoken language and are still clearly felt to be English words, so their English orthography is retained in written communication, which leads to awkward spellings combining German morphemes with English word stems, as in gebootet ("booted up" of a computer) or gecrasht or gecrashed ("crashed", of a computer), downgeloadet, gedownloadet or gedownloaded ("downloaded"). They also retain English phonology in many cases, including phonemes that do not exist in Standard German (such as the /eɪ/ in "update").

=== Pseudo-anglicisms ===
A pseudo-anglicism is a word in another language that is formed from English elements and may appear to be English, but is not used by native English speakers.

Pseudo anglicism	Meaning	Remarks
Basecap	baseball cap	
Beamer	overhead projector	
Fotoshooting	photo shoot	
Handy	mobile phone	It could be derived from handie-talkie or handy-talky, a more convenient, handheld form of the military radio introduced in World War II, better known as "walkie-talkie" or "walky-talky", which was previously carried on the back. Since in German only the word Walkie-Talkie is known, rather unlikely
Showmaster	TV-show host/emcee	
trampen	hitchhiking	
Youngtimer	an old, but not yet vintage or classic car	derived from the German Oldtimer, meaning vintage or classic car (or aircraft), itself derived from the more general (non-car-specific) English oldtimer.

=== Adoption of grammar or idioms ===
Another form of Denglisch consists of calques of popular English expressions which replace German words and idioms. Common examples are:

- Was passierte in 2005? (What happened in 2005?)
  Formally: Was passierte 2005? or Was passierte im Jahr 2005?

Although this is considered incorrect by many native speakers as it violates German grammar, it can be found even in German newspapers.

- Das macht Sinn. (That makes sense.)
  Formally: Das ergibt Sinn.; Das hat Sinn., or Das ist sinnvoll.
- Willkommen zu [unserem Videochannel], properly Willkommen bei ... (although it has been pointed out that combination of "willkommen" with the preposition zu can also be found in German classics).

=== Orthography ===
Another phenomenon is the usage of the possessive construction 's (generally used in English but also correct in German in sundry cases), often called Deppenapostroph or Idiotenapostroph ("Idiot's apostrophe" or "Idiot's inverted comma") instead of the traditional German constructions. For example, a Denglisch speaker might write Wikipedia's Gestaltung ("Wikipedia's design") instead of either Wikipedias Gestaltung or die Gestaltung der Wikipedia. Less often, it is used incorrectly to mark a plural s (Greengrocers' apostrophe); pluralizing with an apostrophe is correct in Dutch, not in German or English.

Handy's, Dessou's,

or for adverbial expressions, such as

montag's (instead of montags, cf. English [on] Mondays).

The apostrophe is also frequently confused with other characters, with stand-alone acute or grave accents being used in its stead.

Denglisch may combine words according to English rules by writing them in succession. According to the Standard German grammar and spelling rules, that is incorrect.

Reparatur Annahme instead of Reparaturannahme

The first spelling, with two separate words, makes no logical or grammatical connection between the words but simply juxtaposes them. The second combines them into one word, an Annahme (in this case a place where something is received) for Reparaturen (repairs). That is often called Deppenleerstelle, or Deppenleerzeichen which means idiot's space, incorrectly separating parts of a compound word.

=== Non-translation ===
Many words are taken over as is from English, with little or no change in spelling even if it doesn't fit the German orthographic system. One German source laments the presence of Denglisch as an "infectious disease" of "raging anglicitis" in the German language, which manifests as a kind of "hybrid communications medium". It gives as examples the words events, economy, performance, entertainment, or electronic cash (Note: Instead of already existing German words Ereignisse, Wirtschaft, Leistung, Unterhaltung, Zahlung per Chip-Karte respectively.) appearing in German.

Some major companies such as Deutsche Bank now conduct much of their business in English, while several departments of the major German telephone company Deutsche Telekom were known as "T-Home" (formerly "T-Com"), "T-Mobile", "T-Online", and "T-Systems".

Reinventing titles for English-language films dubbed into German was once a common practice so, for example, Paul Landres' 1958 Western Man from God's Country became Männer, die in Stiefeln sterben (i.e. Men Who Die with Their Boots On.), while Raoul Walsh's 1941 film They Died with Their Boots On became Sein letztes Kommando (His Last Command) or Der Held des Westens (The Hero of the West). Most current American film titles are no longer translated into German, (Ice Age) although they still often receive German appendages like Prometheus – Dunkle Zeichen (Prometheus – Dark Signs) or include puns not present in the original title, such as Clerks – Die Ladenhüter for Clerks – The Shelf-Warmers. Menus of many global fast food chains also usually go partly or completely untranslated: "Double Whopper (formally: Doppel-Whopper) mit leckerem Bacon und Cheddar Cheese."

=== Advertising language ===
Advertising agencies in German-speaking countries have such a need for skills in English that they want ads for new employees to contain plain English such as "Join us". KFC Germany's recruitment slogan is "I Am for Real", and its website shows very heavy use of English coupled with nonstandard German.

German commercials or, more often, written advertisements are likely to use many English terms:

Mit Jamba! können Sie Klingeltöne, Logos und Spiele direkt aufs Handy downloaden.
Wählen Sie aus Tausenden coolen Sounds, aktuellen Games und hippen Logos.

The verb "downloaden" is alleged to have been coined by Microsoft, as there is a native, common German word ("herunterladen"). Microsoft Windows Update uses the phrase "Downloaden Sie die neuesten Updates" ("Download the latest updates") instead of the standard "Laden Sie die neuesten Aktualisierungen herunter". The latest interface guidelines suggest that the term "herunterladen" should be used again because many users complained. However, Aktualisierungen (unlike herunterladen) would not be idiomatic German in this usage or would at least have to be explained as Softwareaktualisierungen or Programmaktualisierungen, the former involving the new Anglicism "Software".

The use of ("Handy") has its roots in a commercial name, too. It is related to the handheld Walkie-talkie, a commercial name for the two-way radio transceiver to be transported in a bag, later in hands and so called ("Handie-talkie"). A correct translation could be ("Handsprechfunkgerät"). Germans used to cite the word ("Handy") as an example of Denglisch.

Advertising in the field of personal hygiene tends to use much English:

Double Action Waschgel
Vitalisierendes Peeling
Energy Creme Q10
Oil Control Gel Creme
Oil Control Waschgel
[brand name] Visibly Clear Anti-Mitesser Peeling
Ariel Sproodles

The same applies to detergents:

Color Waschmittel instead of Buntwaschmittel or Farbwaschmittel
[brand name] Megaperls
[brand name] Oxy-Action

Larger national and international companies based in Germany also use English to describe their services. The television broadcaster ProSieben uses the slogan "We love to entertain you" while Zurich Financial Services advertise with the slogan "Because change happens". The fastest trains run by the German state-owned railway system Deutsche Bahn (German Rail) are named "IC" and "ICE", abbreviations of "Inter City" and "Inter City Express", while information booths are named ServicePoints, first-class waiting areas are referred to as Lounges, and words like Kundendienst (customer service) and Fahrkarte (ticket) are quickly losing out to their respective English counterparts. As an official stance against this rampant use of Denglisch, the Deutsche Bahn in June 2013 issued a directive and glossary of 2200 Anglicisms that should be replaced by their German counterparts.

Sometimes such neologisms also use CamelCase, as in the Deutsche Telekom's newest rates called "Fulltime", "Freetime", "Call Plus" and "Call Time" offering additionally such features as "CountrySelect". Services are offered at certain 'Callshops', using both languages by building a German-style compound, capitalizing it and using two English words in a new context. It has become common for travel agencies to offer "last minute" bookings or manufacturers to adopt "just in time"; perhaps driven by international commerce and economic interests.

The phrase "Test it" is increasingly common as an English phrase idiosyncratic to German, meaning roughly "Try it out". That is thought to have originated with advertising copy for West cigarettes, exhorting consumers to "Test The West".

== In popular culture ==
- The popular German a cappella group Wise Guys produced a song on their Radio album called "Denglisch", a tongue-in-cheek look at the use of English words in German language. In the song, the lyrics start out mostly German with only a few English words creeping in: "Oh, Herr, bitte gib mir meine Sprache zurück!" (O Lord, please give me my language back!). It progresses to most of the lyrics being English: "O Lord, please gib mir meine Language back". The tune is a parody of My Bonnie Lies over the Ocean.
- In 1985, the famous German poetic songwriter Reinhard Mey recorded "Mey English Song" as a parody on the increasingly frequent playing of English songs on the radio, although the fans "only understand 'railway station'" (literal translation of the German idiom "verstehe nur Bahnhof"; "cannot understand a thing"). In the song, he states, his producer told him, "Well, what do we now for record sell?", urging Mey to sing in English.
- In an episode of the web series Will It Blend? Tom puts a German-English/English-German CD dictionary into his blender. After he finishes blending the dictionary, he says, "Denglish smoke! Don't breathe this!"
- The book I like you – und du? (ISBN 978-3499203237) features frequent code-switching between English and German.
- The songs of Austrian singer Falco, while primarily sung in German, would often include lines or choruses sung in English. This casual mixing of languages became a signature of the artist.
- The punk rock band Goldfinger from Los Angeles produced a cover of "99 Luftballons" by Nena for their 2000 album Stomping Ground in which the fourth verse is in German. They also included a "Germish version" of their song "Spokesman" as a bonus track on their 2002 album Open Your Eyes, containing a mostly German second verse.
- The American Civil War song "I'm Going to Fight Mit Sigel" is sung in English, interspersed with German words, from the point of view of a German-American soldier fighting under General Franz Sigel.
- The Austrian composer and singer Udo Jürgens produced a song "Merry Christmas allerseits" (Merry Christmas to All) for his 2003 album Es werde Licht - meine Winter- + Weihnachtslieder (Let There be Light - My Winter and Christmas Songs), containing a mixture of English and German lyrics.

== See also ==
- Blinkenlights
- Béarlachas
- Danglish
- Dunglish
- Engrish
- False friends
- Franglais
- Language transfer
- List of English words of German origin
- Lübke English
- Macaronic language
- Mixed language

== Notes ==
Notes

=== Works cited ===
- Duckworth, David (1977). Best, Werner; Kolb, Werner; Lauffer, Hartmut (eds.). Zur terminologischen Grundlage der Forschung auf dem Gebiet der englisch-deutschen Interferenz. Kritische Übersicht, und neue Vorschlag [The Terminological Basis of Research in the Field of English-German Interference. Critical Overview, and New Proposal.] (in German). Tübingen: Niemeyer. ISBN 9783484102859. OCLC 185584225. "Neubildungen der deutschen Sprache mit Englischem Sprachmaterial."
- Onysko, Alexander (2007). "4 Pseudo anglicisms and hybrid anglicisms". Anglicisms in German: Borrowing, Lexical Productivity, and Written Codeswitching. Linguistik: Impulse & Tendenzen, 23. Berlin: Walter de Gruyter. p. 52. ISBN 978-3-11-019946-8. OCLC 901310392.
- Sicherl, Eva; Šabec, Nada; Gabrovšek, Dušan (1999). The English Element in Contemporary Standard Slovene: Phonological, Morphological and Semantic Aspects. Razprave Filozofske fakultete. Znanstveni inštitut Filozofske fakultete. p. 14. ISBN 978-86-7207-114-6. OCLC 442412304.
