= Terkel in Trouble =

2004 Danish animated film

- Theatrical release poster
- Danish: Terkel i knibe
- English: Terkel in Trouble
- Directed by: Kresten Vestbjerg Andersen; Thorbjørn Christoffersen; Stefan Fjeldmark
- Screenplay by: Mette Heeno
- Story by: Anders Matthesen
- Produced by: Trine Heidegaard; Thomas Heinesen
- Starring: Anders Matthesen; Kim Mattheson
- Edited by: Per Risager; Mikael R. Ryelund; Martin Wichmann Andersen
- Music by: Bo Rasmussen
- Production company: A. Film Production
- Distributed by: Nordisk Film
- Release dates: 20 March 2004 (NatFilm Festival); 2 April 2004 (Denmark)
- Running time: 77 minutes
- Country: Denmark
- Languages: Danish; English
- Budget: 10 million kr. ($1.6 million)
- Box office: 17.9 million kr. ($2.9 million)

Terkel in Trouble (Danish: Terkel i knibe) is a 2004 Danish adult-animated musical black comedy film starring Anders Matthesen. It is the first Danish computer animated feature film. The film is an adaptation of Matthesen's 2001 comedy album Arne fortæller... Terkel i knibe. Anders Matthesen voices almost all characters in the film. Terkel in Trouble was well received, and was a financial success, earning 17.9 million DKK on a 10 million DKK budget and becoming the seventh highest grossing film in Denmark in 2004. It received multiple accolades, including the Audience Award at the 22nd Robert Awards. Terkel in Trouble has been dubbed into multiple languages, including Norwegian, Swedish, German, Dutch, Hungarian, Italian, Russian, and Ukrainian. An English dub of the film produced by Anvil Studios was released by Eureka Entertainment in the United Kingdom on 1 September 2006.

On 3 February 2017, the film was released in the United States by the distribution company Indican Pictures as The Trouble with Terkel, featuring an American cast. This version of the film received negative reviews.

In 2019, a Danish stage show adaptation of the film premiered, called Terkel – The Motherfårking Musical. Anders Matthesen and director Thorbjørn Christoffersen would later collaborate on Checkered Ninja, a film featuring some of the characters from Terkel in Trouble.

== Plot ==
Terkel is a boy attending 6th grade at a secondary school together with his best friend Jason, who carries an iron pipe with him at all times. One day during recess, Terkel and Jason sit on a bench playing on their Game Boy. They are approached by a man in a green sweater who tells Terkel that he sat on a spider. Terkel shakes it off, saying his jeans can be easily washed. The man, named Gunnar (Justin in the UK dub, Dick Balsac in the US dub) introduces himself as the school's new substitute teacher and promptly leaves. Later during Terkel's Danish class, Gunnar walks in. He informs the class that the previous teacher, Yvonne, has been fatally run over by a car. The class cheers at the news, and Gunnar becomes the new class teacher.

Terkel's parents Sheila and Leon get married. During the wedding reception, two bullies from Terkel's school, sten and Saki, manipulate Terkel into stealing beer for them. When Terkel's short-tempered, alcoholic and violent grand-uncle Stewart Stardust notices, he beats up the bullies. Sten and Saki blame Terkel, and proceed to bully him for it, for which Terkel receives little help. One day an overweight girl in the class, Fat Doris approaches Terkel with a love letter. Sten and Saki notice, and start teasing the two of them, calling them a couple. Terkel feels conflicted on whether to defend Dorit or to go along with the bullies. He goes with the latter, saying he would never "love that fat cow", and Dorit gets so upset that she commits suicide by jumping out the window on the fourth floor. After this incident, Sten and Saki become much closer to Terkel, with them now respecting him. Terkel's relationship with Jason however, becomes much more strained. Terkel starts receiving multiple death threats both at home and at school. He again receives no help, and he becomes increasingly paranoid about the world around him.

One day, Gunnar takes the class on school trip to the woods to go study salamanders. On the bus there, Sten and Saki invite Terkel to sit down with them. He does so, angering Jason. When in the woods, Terkel tries to reconcile with him, but fails, with Jason calling Terkel a sell-out. Terkel proceeds to sleep in Sten and Saki's tent. Terkel says that Jason has been acting strangely aloof, and Sten tells him that Dorit was Jason's sister. Terkel is terrified, thinking all the death threats were from Jason, as revenge for his sister's suicide. As they go to bed, Terkel finds a dead cat in his sleeping bag and he receives a text message from Jason's phone saying "I'm coming to kill you". Sten and Saki advise Terkel to tell Gunnar, which he does.

Wanting to be safe from Jason, Terkel insists that Gunnar comes with him into the woods where he explains everything. Terkel now feels more secure and calls Jasons phone to tell him he's in safe hands. To his horror, he hears ringing sounds coming from Gunnar's pocket. It turns out Gunnar sent all the death threats and messages as revenge for Terkel sitting on the spider when they first met, even killing his teacher Yvonne just so he could get closer to him. Terkel flees, and a race through the woods commences. Gunnar corners Terkel and tries placing him a chokehold, but Jason knocks him out with a pipe, saving Terkel. As the two reconcile, however. Gunnar resuscitates and tries targeting Terkel again, leading to a fight between him and Jason whilst Terkel tries to get the pipe back. In doing so, however, Gunnar kicks it out of his hands and prepares to kill the two boys, but is then stabbed in the head by the falling pipe, supposedly killing him. Terkel and Jason discuss how they're back together, and Joanna is now involved with Jason, when they're found by a guy in a hockey mask wielding a chainsaw, making the two run for their lives in fear. It's revealed to be the narrator, Arne Nougatgren (Barry Cremone in the English dubs), who tries discussing the story's moral, albeit finding difficulty to remember it. Gunnar, meanwhile, looks up at the pipe in his forehead, indicating he's still alive.

== Cast ==
Cast of Terkel in Trouble
| Character name | | Voice actor | | |
| Danish | English | Danish | UK English | US English |
|---|---|---|---|---|
| Terkel | | Anders Matthesen | Adrian Edmondson | Mike Olsen |
| Arne Nougatgren | Barry Cremone | Anders Matthesen | Bill Bailey | Richard Janes (speaking); Rhune Kincaid (singing) |
| Jason | | Anders Matthesen | Ben Bishop | Eve Mauro (speaking); Rhune Kincaid (singing) |
| Sten | Nigel | Anders Matthesen | Ben Bishop | Stephen Ji |
| Saki | | Anders Matthesen | Ben Bishop | Jake Goldman |
| Beate | Sheila | Kim Matthesen | Olivia Colman | Marlise Garba-Wright |
| Rita | Fiona (UK dub); Lucy (US dub) | Anders Matthesen | Helena Roman | Nuria Garba |
| Dorit | Doris | Anders Matthesen | Helena Roman | Vanessa Gomez |
| Sally | | Anders Matthesen | Melaine Cooper | Unknown |
| Silas | Osprey (UK dub); Marcus (US dub) | Anders Matthesen | Ben Bishop | Jeffrey Garver |
| Gunnar Bjerre | Justin (UK dub); Dick Balsac (US dub) | Anders Matthesen | Toby Stephens | Shark Firestone |
| Joanna | | Anders Matthesen | Melaine Cooper | Diana Thorn |
| Ho | | Anders Matthesen | Melaine Cooper | Unknown |
| Uncle Stewart | | Anders Matthesen | Johnny Vegas | Chad Ridgely |
| Leon | | Anders Matthesen | Tim Everett | Chris Tergliafera |
| Priest | | Anders Matthesen | Tim Everett | Thomas Dan Freeney |

Various dubs of the film also have one actor portraying most or all of the roles. This was done for the Norwegian (Aksel Hennie), Swedish (Felix Herngren), German (Bela B.) and Hungarian (Ganxsta Zolee) dubs of the film. This was however not done for the Italian, Ukrainian, Russian, Dutch, and two English dubs, which all feature multiple actors.

== Production ==
"With Help! I am a fish we did everything we could to make it tasteful. Uha, it was supposed to be sold to the USA! The dialogue was adjusted so that it could not offend anyone. But the film was never sold to the United States. So there we were, trying to make some Americans happy, who ultimately did not want the movie. How fun is that? I think you get the farthest when you are not trying to please anyone.

— Stefan Fjeldmark

The characters in the film were conceived by stand-up comedian Anders Matthesen. The character of Grand-uncle Stewart Stardust had been featured previously in Matthesens show Fra ende til Anden in 1999. In 2001, Matthesen and composer Bo Rasmussen created a radio play on DR children's radio called Arne fortæller... Terkel i knibe (Arne tells... Terkel in trouble), a sequel to the previous radio play Hva' snakker du om. Arne fortæller would be released as an album the same year. The album sold 35,000 copies and received the award for "Entertainment Release of the year" at the Danish Music Awards in 2002. The album did however not do as well as Matthesen had hoped.

A. Film was looking to produce a film that was much cheaper than previous efforts like Help! I'm a Fish, as well as something more "crooked and different". Stefan Fjeldmark, co-founder of the studio, had previously listened to Arne fortæller and approached Anders Matthesen to potentially turn the album into a film. Matthesen was very proud of the album despite its mediocre success and accepted the offer immediately. Fjeldmark had grown frustrated with trying to adjust the studios films so they could appeal to an American audience, after Help! I'm a fish had been refused American distribution multiple times. Terkel in Trouble would be a way for the studio to make a film without compromise.

To help convince A. Film, two animators at the studio, Kresten Vestbjerg Andersen and Thorbjørn Christoffersen created a short pilot for the film. It was well received and production on the film began in 2003, with Andersen, Christoffersen and Fjeldmark leading the project. The audio play script would be re-written to fit a film format. Andersen, Christoffersen and Fjeldmark would help with developing the script, pushing some of the comedy and horror elements. Terkel in Trouble would become Christoffersens directorial debut and Matthesens screenwriting debut.

DR was first asked to help finance the project. They were initially interested, but ended up refusing the offer. TV 2 was then approached. They were hesitant at first, but eventually changed their mind. The film would end up with a budget of 10 million DKK ($1.6 million), to which the Danish Film Institute provided half. Due to the small budget, the animation crew developed a crude style for the characters in the film, inspired by South Park, The Simpsons and The Muppets. This sped up production significantly, also helped by then recent advancements in animation technology. By mid-November 2003, half of all animation had been completed. With a crew of 12-15 animators, the film took just four months to animate.

=== Music ===
Terkel in Trouble

Soundtrack album by Anders Matthesen and Bossy Bo
- Released: 2004 (Denmark)
- Recorded: 2003
- Genres: Audio play, hip hop, reggae, pop
- Label: Sony Music

Singles from Terkel in Trouble
- 1. "Paranoia"; 2. "Hva' Med Dig Selv?"; 3. "Ta' Og Fuck Af!"

The film's soundtrack is a re-recording of the original Arne fortæller album, with the bonus song Paranoia added to it.

Track listing

All music is composed by Anders Matthesen and Bo Rasmussen (Bossy Bo).

| No. | Title | Length |
|---|---|---|
| 1. | "Den Nye Lærer" | 7:31 |
| 2. | "Quangs Sang" | 3:37 |
| 3. | "Festen" | 6:46 |
| 4. | "I Anledning Af Beate Og Leons Bryllup" | 2:37 |
| 5. | "Plageánder" | 6:20 |
| 6. | "Hva' Med Dig Selv?" | 4:16 |
| 7. | "Onkel Stewart" | 3:08 |
| 8. | "Arne...Han Er for Cool!" | 2:57 |
| 9. | "Forfulgt" | 7:24 |
| 10. | "Salamanderturen" | 6:53 |
| 11. | "Ta' Og Fuck Af!" | 3:09 |
| 12. | "Terkel I Knibe" | 7:29 |
| 13. | "Flugten" | 4:05 |
| 14. | "Spørg Om Hjælp" | 2:21 |
| 15. | "Rigtige Venner" | 5:15 |
| 16. | "Paranoia" | 5:33 |
| Total length: | | 1:19:21 |

== Release ==
Terkel in Trouble premiered at the NatFilm Festival on 20 March 2004. It was then released in Denmark nation-wide on 2 April 2004. The film sold 64,000 tickets in its first three days upon release, and over 375,000 in its entire theatrical run, grossing a total of 17,9 million DKK ($2.9 million). It became the fourth highest grossing Danish film in Denmark for 2004, and the seventh over all.

=== Critical response ===
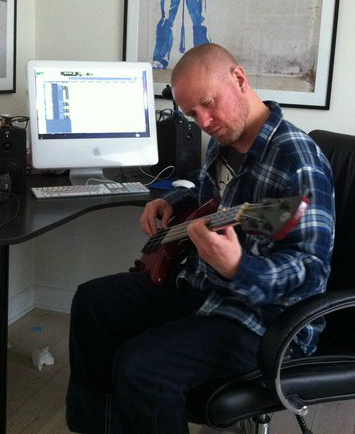
Anders Matthesen received acclaim for his voice acting in the film.

Terkel in Trouble received positive reviews upon its initial release. Writing for Berlingske, Ebbe Iversen called the film "a milestone in film history", and "incredibly entertaining". Palle Schantz Lauridsen of Kristeligt Dagblad wrote "It's one of the funniest things I've seen in a long time - and I knew the story beforehand."

Reviews from other Scandinavian countries were likewise positive. Einar Guldvog Staalesen of Norwegian broadcasting company NRK gave the film a full 6 out of 6 stars, and in a review for the Swedish Newspaper Svenska Dagbladet, Karoline Eriksson wrote that "Terkel in trouble is yet another example of the Danes still totally having us [Swedes] fooled when it comes to making films." While many critics considered the film's animation sub-par, its humor, writing, and Anders Matthesens voice acting received praise, with Palle Lauridsen describing Matthesen as having a "great and unmistakable satirical talent". The actors for the Norwegian and Swedish versions of the film, Aksel Hennie and Felix Herngren, received praise for their dub work.

Eureka Entertainment acquired the distribution rights for the United Kingdom, with the company partnering with Anvil Studios to produce an English dub, which came out in 2006. The dub featured the voices of Adrian Edmondson, Bill Bailey, Olivia Colman, Toby Stephens and Johnny Vegas. In contrast to the Scandinavian release, reviews from UK critics were mixed to negative. Phelim O'Neill of The Guardian gave the film 2 out of 5 stars, criticizing the animation, and stating that besides the films shock value, "[it] often has little else going for it." He did however say the film did not "ooze smug complacency from every pixel like the recent, lazy Cars" Writing for Empire, Sam Toy likewise also gave the film 2 out of 5 stars, criticizing the lack of a clear target audience, but praising the British dubbing cast.

On 3 February 2017, almost 13 years after Terkel in Trouble's initial premiere, the film was released in the United States by distribution company Indican Pictures as The Trouble with Terkel. It was a new English dub featuring an American cast. This version of the film was mostly panned by critics and was described as amateurish, with Nick Schager of Film Journal International calling it "one of the most singularly awful and incompetent productions in cinema history". Katie Walsh of the Los Angeles Times called it "painfully outdated", and criticized its attempts to be offensive, saying it was "totally meaningless".

=== Accolades ===
At the 22nd Robert Awards, Terkel in Trouble won the Audience Award, Best Children/Family Film, Best Original Score, Best Song and Best Sound awards. It was also nominated for best screenplay. It won Best Danish film at the Bodil Awards, and Best film at the Zulu Awards. At the Animafest Zagreb, Terkel in Trouble won the Grand Prize. It was nominated for Best Feature at the Annecy International Animated Film Festival, but lost to Nyócker!

=== Controversy ===
After the film was screened for a group of 6th and 7th graders at the 2004 Frederiksstad Animation Festival in Norway, a number of school leaders protested the film, saying the film promoted bullying and was inappropriate for children. Four schools refused to show the film in an educational context, and the Norwegian children's ombudsman was sent multiple complaints.

Anders Matthesen dismissed these complaints, saying: "I reserve the right to make fun of absolutely everything. It's an opportunity and also a duty I have as a comedian. I believe that it has a therapeutic and redemptive effect in relation to unpleasant topics." Likewise, the chairman of the Danish Media Council for Children Karsten Gynther said the film was not harmful to children.

== Legacy ==
In 2018, a stage musical version of the film, Terkel – The Motherfårking Musical, was announced. It premiered on 14 February 2019.
