= Pagten =

Danish television series

- Created by: Maya Ilsøe
- Composer: Aslak Hartberg
- Country of origin: Denmark
- No. of seasons: 1
- No. of episodes: 24

Production
- Running time: 25 minutes

Original release
- Release: December 1 – December 24, 2009

Pagten (English: The Pact) is a Danish television series in the form of televised Advent Calendar that was shown over the Christmas period in 2009. It was written by Maya Ilsøe. It was screened for Jóladagatal Sjónvarpsins in 2011 & 2016.

== Plot ==
Pagten centers around the boy Malte, who meets the nisse (elf/gnome) Lyda, whose family is in danger because of the ice-witch Iselin, who wants to freeze the nisser so that she can rule supreme in the magical world. But there is one thing that can prevent her from achieving her goal, the Pact. Malte and Lyda must go through three difficult tests in order to win the Pact, which was created between the human N. F. S. Grundtvig and Lyda's nisse-mother, Saia, centuries ago, but when Malte fails the second test the nisser must draw Malte's schoolmate Rune into the ordeal.

Unbeknownst to them, Rune is a bit of a vicious bully and is working together with Iselin, who has managed to manipulate him due to his vulnerability stemming from his insecurity, sense of parental abandonment and sadness and fear of losing his parents' farm which he loves. Malte's other school-mate, Viji, has also disappeared, following a dangerous stunt on the top of the local school roof perpetuated by Rune and his group of bullies.

Malte attempts the test once more, but when they cannot accomplish it they find and rescue Viji, and gets help from her. Viji, having been Iselin's prisoner, knows where they have to go to find a map to the Pact. They do eventually find the Pact, but Iselin manages to get it from them. She tries to freeze it, but Malte and Lyda manages to steal it back. In the last episode, they use the magical Pact, Grundtvig's and Saja's (Lyda's mother) old gloves, to thaw Iselin and destroy her forever.

== See also ==
- List of Danish television series
