= The Julekalender (Norwegian TV series) =

Norwegian television series

- Created by: Ivar Gafseth (Danish translation)
- Developed by: Ivar Gafseth; Tore Johansen; Carsten Knudsen; Uffe Rørbæk Madsen; Erling Mylius; Viggo Sommer
- Starring: Ivar Gafseth; Tore Johansen; Erling Mylius
- Narrated by: Lasse Kolstad
- Countries of origin: Norway (based on the original Danish version)
- No. of seasons: 1
- No. of episodes: 24

Production
- Executive producers: Charlotte Nielsen; Stefan Gravesen
- Producer: Hans Erik Saks
- Running time: 8–15 mins

Original release
- Network: TV 2 (Norway)
- Release: 1 December – 24 December 1994

Note that this is an article about the 1994 Norwegian remake of the original. See The Julekalender for information about the original Danish series, or The Joulukalenteri for the Finnish remake.

The Julekalender (Christmas calendar) is a Norwegian Christmas season television series produced by and starring Travellin' Strawberries (Ivar Gafseth, Tore Johansen, Erling Mylius) in collaboration with Saks Film and Entertainment and TV 2 (Norway), 1994. Around 400,000 viewers followed the series in December 1994, and it has since been broadcast in reruns later years. It was based on the Danish series The Julekalender from 1991, which also inspired a Finnish version in 1997. The original concept and script of the series, as well as its numerous songs came from the Danish trio of De Nattergale (Carsten Knudsen, Uffe Rødbæk Madsen and Viggo Sommer).

The characters spoke Norwenglish, a pidgin of English and Norwegian. The series consisted of 24 episodes (for each day until Christmas), and its production crew came from Trondheim, Norway.

== Characters ==
- Nisses – mischievous Christmas gnomes/elves.
  - Good old gammel nok (Arve Opsahl) – literally good old old enough, the oldest and wisest nisse, who will die unless someone finds the winding key to the play dåse, a music box.
  - Hansi, Fritz and Günther (Travellin' Strawberrys) – the three bravest nisses, who undertake this quest.
- Nåså – greedy vampires wearing business suits and obsessed with money and wealth, they look human until they drink alcohol and reveal their real form, huge glasses and sharp teeth.
  - Benny Jensen – a travelling salesman (or so he claims) who turns out to be a nåså. There is also a large clash between the two different ways of life (as Benny comes to move in with Olaf and Gjertrud in episode 5, as his car runs out of petrol, punctures, breaks down completely, and then gets stolen, supposedly by "Polish mafia").
- Olaf and Gjertrud Sand – a couple of highly stereotypical Trøndere (People from Trøndelag) that the same three actors also play: Olaf and Gjertrud Sand, a country bumpkin couple that live and work on a potato farm with their dog Kvikk. Olaf and Gjertrud speak with a broad rural (Trønder) accent, often leading to Benny misunderstanding what they say.

Erling Mylius	Tore Johansen	Ivar Gafseth	Arve Opsahl
Fritz	Hansi	Günther	Gammel Nok
Benny Jensen	Gjertrud Sand	Olaf Sand	

== Plot ==
A long time ago, in ancient Trøndelag, the nisses lived merrily in their caves, unknown to the human populace of Trondheim.

One day, the wicked nåsås arrived. The nåsås killed many nisses and drove them out of their caves. The nisses in the only cave the nåsås missed hid Den Store Kloke Boken (the big wise book). If nåsås ever possess the book, they will discover the secret to increasing tax rate up to 100% and infiltrate all positions of bureaucracy and rule the world.

Good Old Gammel Nok, the surviving leader of the nisses, sent the three bravest nisses, Hansi, Fritz and Günther, on a quest to find the winding key of the play dåse, a musical box playing his life-tune. Good Old Gammel Nok warned our heroes of the dangers of the nåsås and gave them 'Den Store Kloke Boken' to consult for wisdom.
