= Tveir á báti =

Icelandic television series

- Séra Jón and the Polar Bear in a promotional photo for the series
- Genre: Live-action children's miniseries Advent calendar
- Created by: Kristín Atladóttir
- Directed by: Ágúst Guðmundsson
- Starring: Gísli Halldórsson; Kjartan Bjargmundsson
- Country of origin: Iceland
- Original language: Icelandic
- No. of episodes: 24

Original release
- Network: Sjónvarpið
- Release: 1 December – 24 December 1992

Related
- Stjörnustrákur (1991); Jól á leið til jarðar (1994) (next original production)

Tveir á báti (English: lit. Two on a Boat, play of words lost in translation) is an Icelandic television series that first aired on Icelandic public television channel Sjónvarpið in December 1992. The series is a part of Jóladagatal Sjónvarpsins, an ongoing series of televised Advent calendars. It was written by Kristín Atladóttir, an assistant producer at Sjónvarpið at the time.

The show follows Séra Jón, played by Gísli Halldórsson, who gets stranded in the middle of the ocean in early December after his boat runs out of fuel, and his encounters with an anthropomorphic polar bear, played by Kjartan Bjargmundsson. Among other players is Steinn Ármann Magnússon.

Tveir á báti was rerun on Sjónvarpið in December 2000.

A physical advent calendar containing leads to each episode's plot was published in conjunction with the initial airing of the series.

== Premise ==
Séra Jón is a composer, bell-ringer and seaman from the small village of Stóra-litlu-Bugðuvík. Every Sunday and every major holiday, Séra Jón rings the church bell to call the villagers to church. He also goes to sea every morning on his small fishing boat. One day in early December, Séra Jón is very sleep-deprived from composing a new Christmas carol which he plans to play on the church bells on Christmas Eve. Séra Jón takes a nap as the boat sails out to sea, but oversleeps. When he wakes up, the boat is out of fuel in the middle of the ocean, with no land in sight. Séra Jón needs to find a way to get back home before Christmas so that he can ring the bell on Christmas.
