= Jul på Vesterbro =

2003 Danish satire TV Christmas calendar

- Genre: Satire; Black comedy
- Created by: Anders Matthesen
- Starring: Anders Matthesen
- Country of origin: Denmark
- Original language: Danish

Original release
- Network: DR2

Jul på Vesterbro (literally Christmas on Vesterbro) is a 2003 Danish satire TV Christmas calendar (a TV-series broadcast every day from 1 December to 24 December) targeted adults by Anders Matthesen. It originally aired in December 2003 on DR2, and has since been rebroadcast in 2004, 2009, and 2013. The Christmas calendar is satire on the way Christmas is traditionally presented in TV, by instead presenting drug-addicts, gangsters and religious fanatics, and a social realistic parody on the underclass. It is based on a radio show by Matthesen of the same name, transmitted in 1999 on DR P3.

When DR 2 in December 2003 became the third most viewed TV-channel in Denmark, DR considered Jul på Vesterbro one of the factors. In 2004 it was named "innovation of the year" by the Danish Producers' Association. It is considered to have attained cult status.

== Plot ==
Stewart Stardust lives in an apartment in Vesterbro with his wife Vivian. Their son, Danny, is a drug addict just released on parole, and he moves in with them. A social worker for the public authorities, Arne Nougatgren, is checking up on Danny, as a condition for his parole is that he has a well-functioning home, and that somebody can provide for him. Stewart own a mobile hot dog stand (pølsevogn) placed on Christiansborg square, but his income is threatened when its engine is stolen. The family's financial troubles increase when Danny makes Randi, a drug-addict prostitute, pregnant, and she starts demanding child support from Danny after giving birth two days later, and when their landlord Greta threatens to kick them out if they do not pay the rent they are behind on. A Muslim named Kefir offers to repair the hot dog stand for free, and has a Russian, Igor, providing him spare parts. At the same time, a news presenter reports of fear of a terror attack against an international summit held at Christiansborg, specifically from a terror organisation called "Yellow Crescent" that seemingly cooperates with weapon smugglers from the former Soviet Union.

While Stewart and Danny attempts to convince Arne that the family is well-functioning, Arne decides to get more involved with the family, much to Stewart and Danny's dismay. The repair of the hot dog stand is delayed, as Kefir's spare parts keep getting stolen. Danny sells some "firecrackers" found in the garage (where the hot dog stand is located) to some scouts, and Arne gives them a Christmas decoration made of plastic explosive (thinking it is clay); in both instances the news report of explosions involving scouts. Kefir buys spare parts from Igor for two million kroner, who is handed to him in a red suitcase. While Igor passes out from drinking, Stewart opens the box with spare parts and finds something resembling a bomb or a missile, and he and Danny concludes that is must be a new engine. Shortly thereafter, news report that nuclear warheads from the Soviet Union cost several millions kroner on the black market. Danny can not unlock the suitcase, and sells it locked for 300 kroner. When Igor finds out, he demands it back and threatens to kill Danny.

Danny finds out that Randi have not actually given birth, thought she is still pregnant. Arne reveals that there are public grants for young families, so Stewart sends Danny on a date with Randi so he can make amends. Greta gives Stewart respite on the rent in exchange for a share of the income from the hot dog stand once it has been repaired and Stewart working as the apartment complex's caretaker. Arne has sex with Stewart's wife Vivian, and Stewart becomes angry and beats both Arne, the scouts, Randi, Kefir, Igor, and Greta. He kicks Arne out of the apartment and terminates his arrangement with Greta, so Arne demands that Danny returns to jail and Greta that Steward leaves the apartment. Stewart and Danny instead decide to "fight the system" and barricade themselves in the apartment with heavy weaponry provided by Kefir. After multiple earlier failed attempts by Igor, he returns again to kill Danny and Stewart, but is met with a grenade. Randi is allowed in, as she and Danny have become close.

When the police demand to enter the building, Stewart, Danny, and Randi plans to flee in the hot dog stand, but is stopped by Kefir and his group. Igor joins and demand to be given either his suitcase or his nuclear bomb, and Kefir shoots and kills Igor. Kefir admits to be part of Yellow Crescent, and that their plan is to blew up Christiansborg with the hot dog stand. He orders his men to kill Stewart, Danny, and Randi, but Arne shows up before the order can be carried out. He sings a song about Christmas peace and love that moves everybody. Kefir and Stewart become friends again, and Stewart forgives Arne for sleeping with Vivian. Kefir's wife, who wears a Niqāb, removes it and reveals herself to be a male Israeli Mossad agent named Ibrahim who has infiltrated Yellow Crescent. Ibrahim is killed by Greta, who shows up in full Nazi uniform and announces her intention to build a new world order based on pork. She picks up a sausage from Stewart's pack of sausages that has been rotting all December, takea a bite, and demand that everybody else do the same. Kefir is about to take a bite, but Greta dies of food poisoning before he is able to do so. The police raids the garage and arrests Kefir and his men.

With all problems solved, Stewart, Danny, Randi and Arne returns to the apartment to celebrate Christmas Eve together. They run out of pickled cabbage and Stewart go to the hot dog stand to fetch some more. The story ends with Stewart accidentally detonating the nuclear bomb when he tries to heat the pickled cabbage in the microwave oven, blowing up all of Copenhagen.

The show have a number of recurring elements. Each episode starts with an archeologist in the future recapping the story, and finding an artifact relevant to the story of the episode. They end with a narrator listing some unanswered questions, and the characters interrupting and comment on the voice's words. Every day Stewart opens his Advent calendar, and is always surprised when it turns out to be a beer. Other recurring elements include Stewart mixing up Kefir's name with other dairy products (kefir is a dairy product), Vivian loudly yelling "go away" every time somebody opens the door to her room (only her hand is shown on screen), Stewart offering his increasingly disgusting sausages to the other characters, and Stewart having fond flashbacks of wise words from his "Papa", when he used to beat Stewart.

== Characters ==
Besides extras, all roles are played by comedian Anders Matthesen. The main characters are:

- Stewart Stardust: an alcoholic sailor, who lives in Vesterbro with his aggressive wife Vivian.
- Danny Stardust: the drug-addictive son of Stewart and Vivian, who is on parole
- Arne Nougatgren: a social worker from the municipality who checks on Danny.
- Randi: A prostitute who claim to have a son with Danni
- Greta: The fascist landlord of Stewart and Vivian's apartment
- Kefir: Engineer from Syria, repairing Stewart's hot dog stand
- Igor: Former Colonel in the Russian army, providing spare parts to Kefir

Sune Svanekier was stand-in for Matthesen.

== Title song ==
The title song ("Jul på Vesterbro") is among the most popular Christmas songs in Denmark. It was the tenth most listened Christmas song in the period 2008–2013, according to data from KODA.
