= Stjörnustrákur =

- Genre: Live-action children's miniseries Advent calendar
- Created by: Sigrún Eldjárn
- Directed by: Kári Halldór Þórsson
- Starring: Kristjana Pálsdóttir; Sigurþór Albert Heimisson; Guðfinna Rúnarsdóttir
- Country of origin: Iceland
- Original language: Icelandic
- No. of episodes: 24

Production
- Producer: Jón Egill Bergþórsson

Original release
- Network: Sjónvarpið
- Release: 1 December – 24 December 1991

Related
- Á baðkari til Betlehem (1990); Tveir á báti (1992)

Stjörnustrákur (English: Star Boy) is an Icelandic television series that first aired on Icelandic public television channel Sjónvarpið in December 1991. The series is a part of Jóladagatal Sjónvarpsins, an ongoing series of televised Advent calendars. It was written by children's books author Sigrún Eldjárn.

The show follows the girl Ísafold who one day runs into Blámi, a boy from a distant star, who is stranded on Earth because his space ship broke down. A critical spare part is hidden in a treasure chest somewhere on Earth. Ísafold decides to help Blámi look for the treasure, and throughout the series they chase down different leads to the trove. However, an eccentric middle-aged woman overhears their mission, and is determined to get to the treasure before the children.

Ísafold and Blámi were both played by adults; Kristjana Pálsdóttir and Sigurþór Albert Heimisson respectively. The eccentric woman was portrayed by Guðfinna Rúnarsdóttir. Among other players are Kristbjörg Kjeld, Árni Tryggvason and Ólafía Hrönn Jónsdóttir.

Stjörnustrákur was rerun on Sjónvarpið in December 1998 and 2006.

A children's book written by Sigrún Eldjárn, bearing the same name, and following the same storyline, was published at the time of the show's first airing in 1991. The book was illustrated with production stills from the series.
