= Á baðkari til Betlehem =

- Opening credits
- Genre: Live-action children's miniseries Advent calendar
- Created by: Sigurður G. Valgeirsson; Sveinbjörn I. Baldvinsson
- Directed by: Sigmundur Örn Arngrímsson
- Starring: Inga Hildur Haraldsdóttir; Kjartan Bjargmundsson; Sigrún Waage
- Theme music composer: Sigurður Rúnar Jónsson
- Country of origin: Iceland
- Original language: Icelandic
- No. of episodes: 24

Production
- Producer: Kristín Björg Þorsteinsdóttir
- Running time: Approx. 150 minutes

Original release
- Network: Sjónvarpið
- Release: 1 December – 24 December 1990

Related
- Stjörnustrákur (1991)

Á baðkari til Betlehem (English: On A Bathtub To Bethlehem) is an Icelandic television series that first aired on Icelandic public television channel Sjónvarpið in December 1990. The show was the second televised advent calendar produced in Iceland after Jólin nálgast í Kærabæ from 1988, and is a part of Jóladagatal Sjónvarpsins, an ongoing series of televised Advent calendars.

The show follows two eight-year-old children, Hafliði and Stína, who embark on an adventurous journey to Bethlehem, in order to bring Baby Jesus the gifts of gold, frankincense and myrrh. Their form of transport is a magical flying bathtub lent to them by the concertmistress Dagbjört, who the children suspect of being an actual angel. On their way to Bethlehem, the children face numerous challenges and obstructions, most notable being their repeated encounters with the evil bird Klemmi, who is the main antagonist of the show.

Hafliði and Stína were both played by adults; Kjartan Bjargmundsson and Sigrún Waage respectively. All the other characters, both male and female, were portrayed by actress Inga Hildur Haraldsdóttir, in numerous guises.

Having been rerun in 1995 and 2004, the show has gained a cult following in Iceland, especially among teenagers and young adults who grew up watching the show in its early runs.

A novella bearing the same name, and following the same storyline, was published at the time of the show's first run in 1990. The novella was illustrated by Brian Pilkington.

== List of episodes ==
No.	Title	Synopsis	Featured characters
1.	"Engill í sama húsi" (English: Angel in the Same Building)	Hafliði and Stína argue if Dagbjört, the woman across the hallway, is an angel. They enter her mysterious apartment.	Hafliði, Stína, Dagbjört
2.	"Fljúgandi furðuhlutur" (English: UFO)	Hafliði and Stína get introduced to Dagbjört, who offers to take them to see Baby Jesus in Bethlehem on her flying bathtub. She gives them gold, frankincense and myrrh to bring Jesus as birthday presents, but while she is getting ready to go, the children accidentally fly off on their own with the gifts.	Hafliði, Stína, Dagbjört
3.	"Illfyglið" (English: The Bird of Prey)		Hafliði, Stína, Klemmi the evil bird
4.	"Hrúturinn ógurlegi" (English: The Terrible Ram)		Hafliði, Stína, Elli the farm boy
5.	"Ísbirnan Ólafía" (English: Ólafía the Polar Bear)		Hafliði, Stína, Ólafía the polar bear sow
6.	"Hvað kostar vel upp alið barn?" (English: How Much for a Well-Behaved Child?)		Hafliði, Stína, Tómas Ragnar the dromedary
7.	"Draugagangur í dúkkuhúsi" (English: The Haunted Doll House)		Hafliði, Stína, Barbie
8.	"Hættur í háloftunum" (English: Dangers in the Skies)		Hafliði, Stína, Klemmi (disguised as salesman Sölvi Sölvason)
9.	"Kvöldstund með engli" (English: An Evening with an Angel)		Hafliði, Stína, Dagbjört
10.	"Litla leikkonan" (English: The Little Actress)		Hafliði, Stína, Louisa the orphaned child actress
11.	"Litli leikfangaprinsinn" (English: The Little Prince of Toys)		Hafliði, Stína, Bill Stockefeller the rich boy
12.	"Afdrifarík mistök" (English: A Momentous Mistake)	Klemmi tricks Stína into handing over the gold.	Stína, Klemmi (disguised as The Good Wise Man)
13.	"Hafliði í háska" (English: Hafliði in Peril)	At Bill Stockefeller's mansion, Hafliði is abused and treated as any other toy. Stína rescues him.	Hafliði, Stína, Bill Stockefeller
14.	"Hetjudáð á Háafjalli" (English: A Heroic Act on High Mountain)	Hafliði and Stína, now reunited, fly up to Klemmi's cave on Háafjall mountain to get back the gold.	Hafliði, Stína, Klemmi
15.	"Söngelski jólasveinninn" (English: The Musical Yule Lad)		Hafliði, Stína, Stúfur the Yule Lad
16.	"Nauðlendingin" (English: The Emergency Landing)	Hafliði and Stína help a lonely old inventor at a remote airport recapture the Christmas spirit.	Hafliði, Stína, [?] inventor/airport manager
17.	"Eldsneytislaus á elleftu stundu" (English: Out of Fuel at the Eleventh Hour)		Hafliði, Stína, Dagbjört
18.	"Óvæntir endurfundir" (English: An Unexpected Reunion)		Hafliði, Stína, Klemmi (disguised as old woman, storm scientist and Kertasníkir the Yule Lad)
19.	"Jól í tjaldi" (English: Christmas in a Tent)		Hafliði, Stína, Harun the injured war victim
20.	"Óvini bjargað" (English: An Enemy Rescued)		Hafliði, Stína, Klemmi
21.	"Vitringur á villigötum" (English: A Lost Wise Man)		Hafliði, Stína, Tölvi Skjalfells the computer scientist and self-proclaimed wise man
22.	"Alein í eyðimörkinni" (English: All Alone in the Desert)		Hafliði, Stína, Tölvi Skjalfells
23.	"Svarta skýið" (English: The Black Cloud)		Hafliði, Stína, Klemmi
24.	"Baðkar í Betlehem" (English: A Bathtub in Bethlehem)		Hafliði, Stína, Dagbjört
