= Nakamura (bandit) =

Samurai

Nakamura Chōbei (中村 長兵衛) was a bandit peasant during the 16th century Azuchi–Momoyama period in Japan. He was the leader of a gang of bandits that were stationed at a minor village called Ogurisu, which was near the area of battle during the Battle of Yamazaki of 1582.

== Supposed killing of Akechi Mitsuhide ==
Nakamura is alleged to have killed the general Akechi Mitsuhide. According to this account, after Mitsuhide was defeated at Yamazaki, he passed through the village of Ogurusu. While riding through, he passed by Chōbei who was hiding in a bamboo grove. Chōbei killed Mitsuhide by thrusting his spear into him. This took place less than a month after Mitsuhide had arranged for the death of the famous Oda Nobunaga.

== In popular culture ==
Nakamura's rumored killing of Mitsuhide inspired the ninja doll character in the animated film Checkered Ninja, who is actually possessed by the spirit of a ninja named Taiko Nakamura.
