= The Julekalender =

- Created by: De Nattergale; Hans Erik Saks
- Developed by: Carsten Knudsen; Uffe Rørbæk Madsen; Viggo Sommer
- Starring: Carsten Knudsen; Uffe Rørbæk Madsen; Viggo Sommer; Poul Bundgaard
- Narrated by: Bent Mejding
- Theme music composer: De Nattergale
- Country of origin: Denmark
- No. of seasons: 1
- No. of episodes: 24

Production
- Producer: Hans-Erik Saks
- Running time: 4 hours (10 mins X 24)

Original release
- Network: TV 2 (Denmark)
- Release: 1 December – 24 December 1991

The Julekalender (The Christmas Calendar) is a julekalender that originally aired before Christmas 1991. A Norwegian version was made in 1994, and a Finnish version appeared in 1997. It was written and performed almost entirely by a trio of Danish comedy musicians called De Nattergale with financial and technical assistance from TV2, a Danish television company. It was hugely successful at the time, causing many invented phrases from the series to enter popular culture and was later released on VHS and subsequently DVD.

It consisted of 24 episodes (one for each day of December until Christmas Eve), as has been typical for most other TV "Christmas calendars" before and since The Julekalender.

== Plot ==
The premise of the show is fairly simple: long, long ago, the race of Nisser lived happily in Denmark getting up to mischief with the humans, drinking, and making merry. Then the "Nå-såere" came - evil, vampire-esque creatures with an unhealthy obsession for money and counting - and almost eradicated the Nisser. A few Nisser survived and escaped to America, among them good old Gammelnok (literally, "old enough", the one character not to be played by a member of De Nattergale), who is now on the brink of death, as the music box that plays his life tune needs to be wound up.

Gammelnok gathers three of the remaining Nisser (Hansi, Günther, and Fritz (all distinctly German names)) and sends them off to Denmark, to find the old Nisse cave where the key to wind up the music box is. He gives them The Big Book to take with them, an ancient tome that contains the answer to any and all questions, warning them to take great care that it does not fall into the hands of a Nå-såer. If this were to happen, all would be lost. They are also warned to take care, as the Nå-såere nowadays have taken the appearance of normal humans, but when they consume alcohol, they regain their original appearance, with fangs, and thick-rimmed glasses. The three merrily set off, and this is where the first episode begins.

The use of language that the Nisser speak is a major part of the show. While the characters in the series refer to it as English, the language is actually a mixture of both Danish and English vocabulary, grammar, and sentence structure. Some of the dialogue that stands out in the series includes:

- "He who first gets to the mill is he who first gets painted"
- "Think you da lige a little about"
- "Let us straks try to smake it!"
- "That is der simpelthen overhead not noget to do with"

Additionally, key characters, events, or items are also called by odd hybrid names: the music box, for example, is a play dåse, Father Christmas is the Christmas man and the act of wood-carving is called "snitting". Since De Nattergale are actually musicians (albeit comedy musicians), the Nisser often burst into song, or find excuses to work music into each episode.

Another large part of the appeal are the highly stereotypical Danes that the same three actors also play: Oluf and Gertrud Sand, a country bumpkin couple that live and work on a potato farm in Jutland, and Benny Jensen, a travelling salesman (or so he claims) from Copenhagen (who turns out to be a Nå-såer). Oluf and Gertrud speak with a broad country dialect, often leading to Benny misunderstanding what they say. There is also a large clash between the two different ways of life (as Benny comes to move in with Oluf and Gertrud in an early episode, as his car runs out of petrol, punctures, breaks down completely, and then gets stolen, supposedly by the "Polish Mafia"). Benny also thinks Oluf's father's name, Anders Sand, is funny, because it closely resembles Anders And, the Danish name for Donald Duck.

== Characters ==
- Oluf Sand (Viggo Sommer) is a potato farmer who lives on a farm in Jutland with his wife Gertrud. He doesn't say much, and enjoys reading the newspaper in his armchair while smoking his pipe. He often receives a call from someone (possibly the same person each time) who wants to buy potatoes, which Oluf often increases the price of and advises that a receipt is no use. He often breaks the fourth wall, remarking on the peace and quiet when Gertrud leaves, but when Benny Jensen insults her he is very quick to defend her. His Christmas wishes, according to Gertrud, never seems to be renewed, meaning that he wishes for a smoking pipe, tobacco or a pipe-cleaner. He has a father named Anders Sand, which Benny finds humorous as it sounds much like Anders And - Donald Duck's Danish name. He secretly saves money enough to buy a 'food-processor' for Gertrud, but tells her that they can't afford it. For Christmas he receives a smoking pipe from Gertrud.
- Gertrud Sand (Carsten Knudsen) is Oluf's wife. She is rather loud, often talking non-stop about how nice everything would be if this or that were different. She spends the entire series asking for "the big crate with Christmas stuff. She also spends most episodes talking about her wish for a food-processor, but is told that they can't afford it. When Oluf doesn't listen to what she says she shakes her head, while breaking the fourth wall. When Oluf talks in the telephone about his potato-selling, Gertrud is told that it was wrong number when she asks. When she accidentally gives The Book away to some scouts for charity, she is confronted by Benny Jensen who screams and yells at her. She has a sister (known simply as Sister) and a brother-in-law named Kaj. When her sister calls her on the telephone she can talk for hours. She likes to listen to the radio. For Christmas she receives a foodprocessor from Oluf.
- Benny Jensen (Uffe Rørbæk Madsen) is a nåsåer who has taken the appearance of a human and visits the Sands. He claims that his car has run out of petrol, soon punctures, later breaks down completely, and then gets stolen, supposedly by the "Polish Mafia" (which is doubtful), and he comes to live with the farmers for the rest of the series, searching for nisse-life. He soon finds out about a cave in which three nisser lives in and spends the rest of the series making excuses to leave in order to find the cave. When he finally manages to make his way inside, knock out Günther, the youngest nisse, and steal The Big Book. After that he spends all the time reading the book at Sands, making the life a menace to the humans and the nisser. He angers when the book disappears, yelling at Gertrud. He gets pressed into taking alcohol when he claims it's his birthday and after that he can't stop it again. He never manages, however being close, to kill the nisser. For Christmas he receives a book about nisser from Oluf and Gertrud, having made many nisse-related references.
- Gynter (Carsten Knudsen) is a nisse who spends the majority of the series carving a new propeller for their plane after the last one broke.
- Hansi (Uffe Rørbæk Madsen) is a nisse who does most of the work for the trio. He has a running gag of asking why he has to do all the work, to which Fritz replies "Because you're the one with the biggest teeth and the ugliest clothes" which because of the mixed language is actually spoken as "Because you're the one with the biggest tænder and the grimmest' tøj".
- Fritz (Viggo Sommer) is the apparent leader of the trio of nisser.

== Soundtrack ==
Songs from The Julekalender

Soundtrack album by De Nattergale
- Released: 1991
- Genre: Folk
- Label: CMC Entertainment

In 1991 the same year The Julekalender was made and shown first time, a music album was published called Songs From The Julekalender which have all the songs from The Julekalender in it.

- "The Støvle Dance" (episode 4) ("The Boot Dance")
- "It's hard to be a nissemand" (episode 1, 2, 3, 5, 9, 14, 16, 18 and 20) (only one episode contains the full song) ("It's hard to be a nisse-man")
- "It's hard to be a snittermand" (episode 7) ("It's hard to be a carving-man")
- "It's good to be a nissemand" (episode 24) ("It's good to be a nisse-man")
- "The Blues" (episode 18)
- "Will She Mon Wait For Me" (episode 21) ("I Wonder If She Will Wait For Me")
- "Thousands of Vendings" (episode 23) ("Thousands of Sayings")
- "Knokkel Pukkel Man" (episode 22) ("Working Slaved Man")
- "Jäger-Lied" (episode 12) ("Hunter-Song") [German song]
- "Snit a Little Bittle" (episode 10) ("Carve a Little Bit")
- "De Kære Minder" (various) ("The Dear Memories") [heard on radio]
- "Rosita og Carlo" (various) ("Rosita and Carlo") [heard on radio]
- "The Dæjlig News Blues" (episode 16) ("The Splendid News Blues")
- "Long Time ago in Bethlehem" (episode 6)

== See also ==
- Tomte
- The Julekalender (Norwegian TV series)
- The Joulukalenteri
