= Viggo Sommer =

Danish actor and musician (born 1957)

Viggo Sommer Kristensen (born 28 January 1957) is a Danish musician and comedian. He is primarily known for his work with the comedy trio De Nattergale, which made the popular TV-show The Julekalender in 1991. Sommer also appeared in Bamse's Billedbog for children. In late November 2015, the Danish punk band Skullclub published a Christmas album "Sving Dine Dadler" in which Sommer contributed the vocals.

Sommer was born in Viby at Aarhus, and still lives in Aarhus.

== Discography ==
=== Solo albums ===
- 2002 Så sku' den ged vist være barberet

=== With De Nattergale ===
- 1987 Hva' har vi da gjort ... siden vi ska' ha'et så godt
- 1988 Nu ka' det vist ik' bli' meget bedre
- 1990 Det ka' jo aldrig gå værre end hiel gal
- 1991 Songs From The Julekalender
- 1992 Vi må da håbe det bli'r bedre i morgen
- 1995 Nu griber det godt nok om sig

== Filmography ==
- 1989 Walter og Carlo i Amerika
- 1991 The Julekalender
- 1994 Vildbassen
- 2001 CWC/Canal Wild Card
- 2003 CWC World
- 2011 Ludvig & Julemanden
- 2013 Pendlerkids
- 2015 Hedensted High

=== Commercials ===
- 2002–03 Vildmændene – commercial for Arla
