= Peter Gantzler =

Danish actor

Peter Gantzler is a Danish actor. He is perhaps best known for his parts in Taxa and Italian for Beginners.

== Early life and education ==
Peter Gantzler originally studied Danish at the University of Copenhagen, but changed to the Danish National School of Theatre, whence he graduated in 1990.

== Career ==
Gantzler has performed in various theatres in the Copenhagen area, but is primarily known from television and movies.

== Filmography ==
- Rocking Silver (1983)
- Mord i mørket (1986)
- Kaj's fødselsdag (1990)
- Operation Cobra (1995)
- Davids bog (1996)
- Smilla's Sense of Snow (1997)
- Når mor kommer hjem (1998)
- Mimi og madammerne (1998)
- Pizza King (1999)
- In China They Eat Dogs (1999)
- Help! I'm a Fish (voice in Danish language original - 2000)
- Italian for Beginners (2000)
- Anja & Viktor (2001)
- At klappe med een hånd (2001)
- Min søsters børn (2001)
- Listetyven (2002)
- Bjergkuller (2002)
- Campingvognen (2002)
- Min søsters børn i sneen - (2002)
- Til højre ved den gule hund (2003)
- Fakiren fra Bilbao (2004)
- Store planer (2005)
- Solkongen (2005)
- Steget efter (2005)
- Dommeren (2005)
- Direktøren for det hele (2006)
- Små mirakel och stora (2006)
- Tempelriddernes skat (2006)
- A Viking Saga (2007)
- 33 Scenes from Life (2008)
- The Last Kingdom: Seven Kings Must Die (2023)

== Television ==
- Mørklægning (1992)
- Kald mig Liva (1992)
- Tre ludere og en lommetyv (1993)
- Taxa (1997)
- Hjerteflimmer (1998)
- Turbulent sone (2000)
- Skjulte spor (2000)
- Den serbiske dansker (2001)
- Er du skidt, skat? (2003)
- Krøniken (2004-2005)
- The Last Kingdom (2015)
- Sommerdahl (2022)
- Blinded (Fartblinda) (2022)

== Awards ==
- 2001: Best actor (Valladolid International Film Festival), Robert for best supporting actor, best actor (Bordeaux International Festival of Women in Cinema) - all for the portrayal of Jørgen Mortensen in Italian for Beginners.
