= Birgitte Hjort Sørensen =

Danish actress (born 1982)

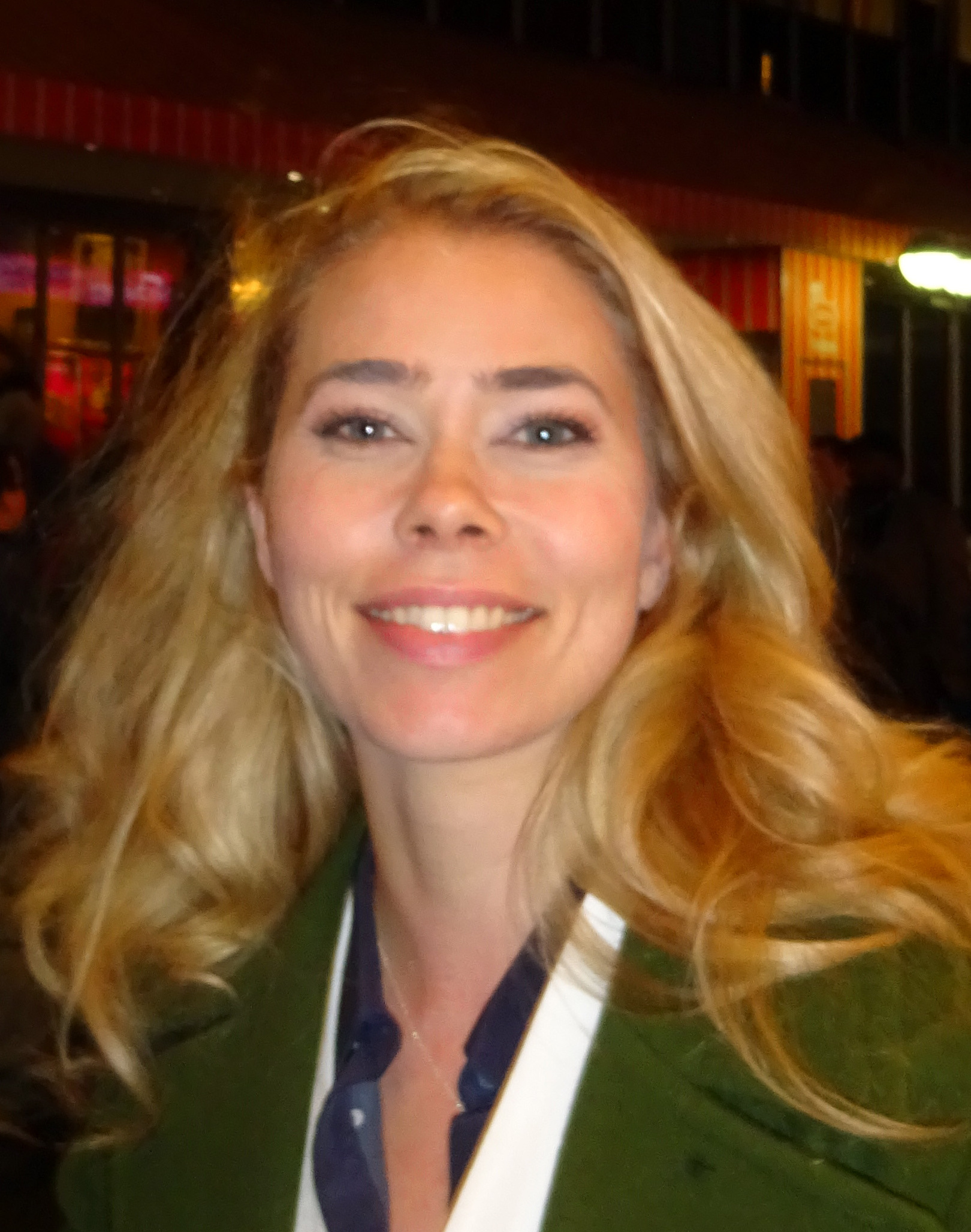
- Sørensen in October 2016
- Born: 16 January 1982 (age 44); Hillerød, Denmark
- Education: Danish National School of Performing Arts
- Occupation: Actress
- Years active: 2005–present
- Partner: Kristian Ladegaard Pedersen
- Children: 2
- Website: www.birgittehjortsorensen.com

Birgitte Hjort Sørensen (born 16 January 1982) is a Danish actress. She has been nominated for three Robert Awards and one Bodil Award. Born in Hillerød and raised in Birkerød, Sørensen aspired to an acting career after visiting London while at school and watching the West End production of the musical Chicago. She graduated from the Danish National School of Performing Arts. Her acting debut was in a minor role in the television series The Eagle in 2005. She followed this by playing Roxie Hart in a Copenhagen production of Chicago, and later on the West End. Sørensen's breakthrough role was as television journalist Katrine Fønsmark in the Danish political drama television series Borgen (2010–2013, 2022).

== Early life ==
Sørensen was born in Hillerød on 16 January 1982. She grew up in Birkerød. Both her parents are doctors and she has two elder sisters. Her early education was at the Bistrup School in Birkerød and Øregård Gymnasium in Hellerup. At the latter, she was the student council chair and editor of the school magazine. Sørensen decided in her early teens not to follow her parents' footsteps in pursuing a career in medicine after work experience with her mother at a geriatrics ward. She commented, "Being met with that number of people who can no longer go to the bathroom or eat by themselves, it was traumatising. I lived too much with their misery."

While on a school trip to London at the age of 19, she watched the West End production of the musical Chicago which motivated her to become an actress. Sørensen spoke of the experience in an interview for The Guardian, "It was so amazing and sexy, and I sat there thinking, 'I want to be on that stage one day.'". Her motivation was solidified by her participation in a mini-musical school organised by the Gladsaxe Theatre which provided a six-month introduction to musical theatre. She continued her studies at the Danish National School of Performing Arts, during which time Sørensen made her acting debut in 2005 as a receptionist on the television series The Eagle. The school forbid its students from having jobs so Sørensen feigned illness to appear on the television show. Two years later she played the lead role of Roxie Hart in the 2007 production of Chicago at the Det Ny Teater in Copenhagen. The musical was critically acclaimed and became the highest grossing Danish theatre production of the year. For her performance she received a Reumert prize. Sørensen then reprised the role in the West End production in 2008 at the Cambridge Theatre.

== Career ==
In 2010, she made her breakthrough by playing the idealistic journalist, Katrine Fønsmark, in the DR fictional political drama Borgen which charted the rise of Denmark's first female prime minister. In order to prepare for the role, she spent a summer training with television news teams and reporters. Sørensen received critical acclaim for playing a strong female protagonist on the show, and international recognition especially in the United Kingdom. For the show's third season, Sørensen received a nomination for the Robert Award for Best Actress in a Leading Role (Television). She also garnered her first nomination for the Robert Award for Best Actress in a Leading Role for playing a criminal psychologist's secretary in the action film Ved verdens ende (2009) with Nikolaj Lie Kaas, and Nikolaj Coster-Waldau. In 2012, Sørensen portrayed painter Marie Krøyer in the biographical film The Passion of Marie which earned her second Best Actress nomination at the Robert Awards. The following year, she appeared as Virgilia in the play Coriolanus with Tom Hiddleston at Donmar Warehouse, London.

In 2015, Sørensen appeared in the "Hardhome" episode of the HBO fantasy drama series Game of Thrones playing Karsi, a wildling chieftain. In the same year, she starred with Anna Kendrick in the musical comedy sequel Pitch Perfect 2 as Kommissar, the leader of a rival German a cappella group. She was also nominated for the Bodil Award for Best Supporting Actress for her performance in Someone You Love, in which she played a mother suffering with drug addiction.

Sørensen played Andy Warhol's muse Ingrid in Martin Scorsese's HBO television series, Vinyl (2016). In the latter part of the same year, she made her Broadway debut in the play Les Liaisons Dangereuses. She reprised her role as Katrine Fønsmark in Borgen in 2022 when the show returned for a fourth season on Netflix.

== Personal life ==
She is in a relationship with television writer and producer Kristian Ladegaard Pedersen. They met when she auditioned for a role as a television host and have two daughters.

== Filmography ==
=== Film ===
Year	Title	Role	Language	Notes	Ref.
2006	Tre Somre	Nanna	Danish	Short film English title: Three Summers	
2007	Canoe	The girl	Danish	Short film	
2007	Crush	Lotte	Danish	Short film	
2008	The Funeral	Daisy	Danish		
2008	Anja & Viktor – I medgang og modgang	Regitze	Danish	English title: Anja & Viktor – In Sickness and in Health	
2008	The Candidate	Sarah	Danish		
2008	Alliancen	Sofie	Danish	Short film English title: The Alliance	
2009	Ved verdens ende	Beate	Danish	English title: At World's End	
2010	Truth About Men	Girlfriend of the squire's son	Danish		
2011	Love Is in the Air	Camilla	Danish	Danish title: Magi i luften	
2011	Miss Julie	Julie	Danish		
2012	The Passion of Marie	Marie Krøyer	Danish	Danish title: Balladen om Marie Krøyer	
2014	National Theatre Live: Coriolanus	Virgilia	English	Filmed version of the Donmar Warehouse play	
2014	Autómata	Rachel Vaucan	English		
2014	In Order of Disappearance	Marit	Norwegian		
2014	Someone You Love	Julie	Danish	Danish title: En du elsker	
2014	The Gas Man	Mia	Danish	Short film	
2015	Pitch Perfect 2	Kommissar	English		
2015	Sommeren '92	Minna Vilfort	Danish		
2017	3 Things	Camilla	Danish		

=== Television ===
Year(s)	Title	Role	Language	Notes	Ref.
2005	The Eagle	Nanna	Danish	Episode: "Keres — Del 16"	
2008	Maj & Charlie	Sidse	Danish	1 episode	
2010–2013, 2022	Borgen	Katrine Fønsmark	Danish	38 episodes	
2013	Bluestone 42	Astrid	English	Series 1, Episode 3	
2013	Agatha Christie's Marple	Greta	English	Episode: "Endless Night"	
2014	Midsomer Murders	DS Anna Degn	English	Episode: "The Killings of Copenhagen"	
2015	Game of Thrones	Karsi	English	Episode: "Hardhome"	
2016	Vinyl	Ingrid	English	10 episodes	
2017	Flashback	Host	Danish		
2018	Greyzone	Victoria Rahbek	Danish; Swedish	10 episodes	
2024	Twilight of the Gods	Hervor	English	8 episodes	

== Stage ==
Year(s)	Title	Role(s)	Theatre	Language	Notes	Ref(s)
2007	Mød mig på Cassiopeia	Frk. Sørensen	Nørrebros Theater	Danish		
2007	Chicago	Roxie Hart	Det Ny Teater	Danish		
2008	Chicago	Roxie Hart	Cambridge Theatre	English		
2008	Bornholmerrevyen	Various	Rønne Theater	Danish		
2009	Slutstrand	Eva	Mammutteatret	Danish		
2011	GNAGS	Various	Black Box Theater	Danish		
2013–2014	Coriolanus	Virgilia	Donmar Warehouse	English	17 December 2013 – 13 February 2014	
2014	Umbrellas of Cherbourg	Geneviève	Betty Nansen Teatret	Danish		
2016–2017	Les Liaisons Dangereuses	Madame de Tourvel	Booth Theatre	English	30 October 2016 – 8 January 2017	
2018	Et Vintereventyr	Queen Hermione	Teater Republique	Danish	12 May – 9 June	
