= Bordeaux International Festival of Women in Cinema =

Former film festival held in France

The Bordeaux International Festival of Women in Cinema (French: Festival international du cinéma au féminin de Bordeaux), formerly Festival international du cinéma au féminin, was an annual film festival celebrating and promoting the work of women in cinema. After being established and running for several years in Arcachon in 1999, the festival took place each October in Bordeaux, in the French department of Gironde, until 2005.

== History ==
The festival's first three editions took place in Arcachon, Nouvelle-Aquitaine, from 1999 until 2001, when it was known as Festival international du cinéma au féminin.

The inaugural edition of the festival was held from 17 to 19 September 1999. The festival hosted a special tribute to French actress and screenwriter Bulle Ogier, who was awarded a special "Wave of Honour" for her career, and whose seven films were during the week.

In 2000, it was held in Arcachon from 18 to 24 September, with Philippe Galland as president. The festival screened around 60 films, including tributes and retrospectives. Waves of Honour were given for the actress Miou-Miou, director Catherine Breillat, and producer Christine Gouze-Rénal. There were eight films in competition.

For the fourth edition, the festival took place in Bordeaux in 2002.

The fifth edition took place from 22 to 18 September 2003. It included a retrospective of British films, organised by the British Film Institute, featuring some films by Emily Young, Lynne Ramsay, and Sally Potter.

The sixth edition took place from 27 September to 3 October 2004.

The seventh and last edition was held between 3 and 9 October 2005. Annette Bening won the Golden Wave for Best Actress, for her performance in Being Julia, directed by Hungarian director István Szabó.

== Description ==
The festival screened films written, produced, or directed by women from around the world, screening over 50 films, both short and feature films, unreleased in French cinemas. There was a competition for the feature films, with awards including the Golden Wave, Audience Award, a Special Jury Award, and Special Mention.

== Awards ==
Awards offered by the festival were known as "Vagues d'or" ("Golden Waves), and included: Best Film, Best Actress, Best Actor, Best Screenplay, and an Audience Award.

== Past winners ==
The French/Algerian film Inch'Allah Dimanche, written and directed by Yamina Benguigui, won the Golden Wave, the Audience Award, and a third award at the festival in 2001, when the festival was still in Arcachon.

In 2004, the Danish film In Your Hands, directed by Annette K. Olesen and starring Ann Eleonora Jørgensen, won the Audience Award.

== See also ==
- List of women's film festivals
