= Marie Askehave =

Danish actress and singer (born 1973)

- Born: 21 November 1973 (age 52); Nibe, Denmark
- Education: Danish National School of Performing Arts
- Occupations: Actress; singer
- Years active: 2006–present
- Spouse: David Owe (m. 2006)
- Children: 2

Marie Askehave (born 21 November 1973) is a Danish actress and singer.

She was born in Nibe and graduated from Danish National School of Performing Arts in 2003. Since 8 July 2006 has been married to colleague David Owe. They have two daughters. Askehave is a member of Denmark's Socialist People's Party.

Askehave is best known for her 2007 role as Rie Skovgaard in The Killing. She also has appeared in stage productions. In 2006, she appeared in a staging of Ole Lund Kirkegaard's Frode og alle de andre rødder at Musikhuset Aarhus. She played the lead role of Maggie in a production of Cat on a Hot Tin Roof at Odense Teater. In 2007, she released her debut album Detour.

== Filmography ==
=== Film ===
Year	Title	Role	Notes
2006	Rene hjerter	Kvindelig Betjent	
2007	Just like Home	Defektrice	
2014	Klassefesten 2 - Begravelsen	Malene	English title: "The Reunion 2: The Funeral"
2014	Familien Jul	Agnete Jul	English title: "The Christmas Family"
2016	Familien Jul 2 - I nissernes land	Agnete Jul	English title: "The Christmas Family 2 - In the Land of the Elians"
2017	Den bedste mand	Lis	English title: "Pound for Pound"
2017	Gud taler ud	Epidemilæge	English title: "Word of God"
2019	Labans Jul	Maja	TV film
2021	Small Claims Court		Short film
2021	Familien Jul og nissehotellet	Agnete Jul	English title: "The Christmas Family and the Pixie Hotel"
2025	In Ashes	Aske's Mum	Danish title: Se gennem Aske

=== Television ===
Year	Title	Role	Notes
2007	Mr. Poxycat & Co	Gitte	Series regular, 6 episodes
2007	Forbrydelsen	Rie Skovgaard	Series regular, 20 episodes
2009	Store drømme	Rebekka	Series regular, 10 episodes
2011	Those Who Kill	Maria	Episode: "A Deadly Game"
2013	Borgen	Benedikte Nedergaard	Recurring role, 6 episodes
2013	Dicte: Crime Reporter	Francesca Olsen	Episode: "Violence and Power"
2014	Midsomer Murders	Ingrid Madsen	Episode: "The Killings of Copenhagen"
2017	Surrogate	Alexanfra Faye	Episode: "Your Body, Your Rules"
2017	Herrens Veje	Ordstyrer	Episode: ""Du må ikke have andre guder end mig" - Exodus 20:3"
2017	Laban: en juletragedie	Maja	Miniseries, 4 episodes
2018	Versailles	Delphine	Series regular, 10 episodes
2018	Hånd i hånd	Cille	Recurring role, 4 episodes
2019	Follow the Money	Isa	Series regular, 10 episodes
2020	Min fars krig	Asta Christiansen	Miniseries, 3 episodes
2020	Advokaten	Boel Grønvold	Series regular, 8 episodes
2020	Sygeplejeskolen	Fru Hedegaard	Recurring role, 3 episodes
2020	Pulse	Mette, Bastians mor	Recurring role, 2 episodes
2021	Fogedretten	Eva	Miniseries
2021	Hvide Sande	Rigmor	Recurring role, 3 episodes
2021	Overleverne	Marlene	Series regular, 6 episodes
