= Jens Okking =

Danish actor, singer and politician. (1939–2018)

Jens Dyhr Okking
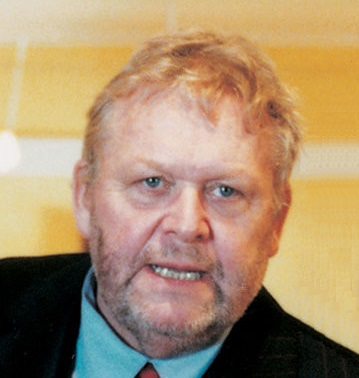
- Okking (2001)
- Born: 18 December 1939; Copenhagen, Denmark
- Died: 21 January 2018 (aged 78); Copenhagen, Denmark

Jens Dyhr Okking (18 December 1939 – 21 January 2018) was a Danish actor, singer and politician.

Jens Okking was mostly known outside of Denmark from Lars von Triers TV-series The Kingdom. In Denmark, Okking was a notable actor for many years, both in theatre, films and TV series and he also worked as theatre director. Apart from his acting, Okking performed as a singer throughout his career, including many recordings with a variety of musicians, mainly from Denmark. He also used his voice to record several audiobooks, mostly for children, and in radio plays for the Danish Broadcasting Corporation (DR).

Jens Okking was a member of the European Parliament in 1999–2003, initially elected for the June Movement, but he later changed affiliation to the People's Movement against the EU.

== Filmography (selected) ==
A selection of films Okking participated in includes:

- The Only Way (1970)
- Tjærehandleren (1971)
- Revolutionen i vandkanten (1971)
- Olsen-bandens store kup (1972)
- Præsten i Vejlby (1972)
- Olsen-banden går amok (1973)
- Flugten (1973)
- Nitten røde roser (1974)
- Familien Gyldenkål (1975)
- Familien Gyldenkål sprænger banken (1976)
- Strømer (1976)
- En by i provinsen (1977)
- Affæren i Mølleby (1976)
- Den korte sommer (1976)
- Nyt legetøj (1977)
- Skytten (1977)
- Pas på ryggen, professor (1977)
- Hør, var der ikke en som lo? (1978)
- Slægten (1978)
- Mig og Charly (1978)
- Honning Måne (1978)
- The Witch Hunt (1981)
- Langturschauffør (1981)
- Gummi Tarzan (1981)
- Rocking Silver (1983)
- Zappa (1983)
- Kampen om den røde ko (1987)
- Guldregn (1988)
- Miraklet i Valby (1989)
- Gøngehøvdingen – 1992 som Kaptajn Mannheimer.
- Det forsømte forår (1993)
- Riget I (1994)
- Menneskedyret (1995)
- Ondt blod (1996)
- Barbera (1997)
- Riget II (1997)
- At klappe med een hånd (2001)
- Jolly Roger (2001)
- Old Men in New Cars (2002)
- Inkasso (2004)
- Den gode strømer (2004)
- Opbrud (2005)
- Solkongen (2005)
- Bag det stille ydre (2005)
- Næste skridt (2006)
