= The Shooter (2013 film) =

- Film poster
- Directed by: Annette K. Olesen
- Written by: Tony Giglio
- Based on: The Sharpshooter by Anders Bodelsen and Franz Ernst
- Produced by: Ashok Amritraj; Andrew Stevens
- Starring: Trine Dyrholm; Kim Bodnia
- Cinematography: Gary Graver
- Edited by: Brett Hedlund
- Music by: Deeji Mincey; Boris Zelkin
- Release date: 28 February 2013
- Running time: 90 minutes
- Country: Denmark
- Language: Danish

The Shooter (Danish: Skytten) is a 2013 Danish crime film directed by Annette K. Olesen.

It is a remake of the 1977 film The Sharpshooter, which was written by Anders Bodelsen and Franz Ernst.

== Cast ==
- Trine Dyrholm as Mia Moesgaard
- Kim Bodnia as Rasmus Holm Jensen
- Kristian Halken as Steffen Husfeldt
- Nikolaj Lie Kaas as Thomas Borby
- Lars Ranthe as Jesper Bang
- Henning Valin Jakobsen as Kriminalreporter
- Marie-Louise Coninck as Fru Kamper
- Carsten Bjørnlund as Adam Larsen
- Marina Bouras as Marianne
- Thue Ersted Rasmussen as Journalistelev
- Rhea Lehman as USA's udenrigsminister
- Bent Mejding as Steen Birger Brask
- Henrik Prip as Christian Løvschall
- Ida Dwinger as Fru Løvschall
