= Love at First Hiccough =

Kærlighed ved første hik
- Directed by: Tomas Villum Jensen
- Written by: Dennis Jürgensen (novel)
- Starring: Robert Hansen; Sofie Lassen-Kahlke
- Distributed by: RGF
- Release date: 15 October 1999
- Running time: 151 min
- Country: Denmark
- Language: Danish
- Box office: 460,000 admissions (Denmark)

Kærlighed ved første hik (Love at First Hiccough) is a 1999 Danish drama film based on the novel by Dennis Jürgensen.

== Cast ==
- Robert Hansen - Viktor
- Sofie Lassen-Kahlke - Anja
- Sebastian Jessen - Brian
- Rasmus Albeck - Esben
- Karl Bille - Thorkild
- Jonas Gülstorff - Nikolaj
- Joachim Knop - Peter

== Reception ==
The film was the fourth highest grossing film in Denmark for the year with 460,000 admissions.
