= David Owe =

Danish actor and stuntman (born 1977)

David de Coninck Owe (born 2 December 1977) is a Danish actor and stuntman. Internationally, he is probably best known for his part in the Emmy Award winning TV series The Eagle. He graduated from the Danish National School of Theatre and Contemporary Dance in 2003.

In Denmark, David Owe is also noted for roles in the TV series 2900 Happiness, the movie The Lost Treasure of the Knights Templar II, and for winning the second season of the Danish version of Dancing with the Stars. He has also released an album entitled Tomorrow. He is married to actor Marie Askehave. Together they have two daughters.
