= Stolen Spring (film) =

- Directed by: Peter Schrøder
- Written by: Hans Scherfig (novel)
- Starring: Frits Helmuth
- Distributed by: Regner Grasten
- Release date: 1993
- Running time: 89 minutes
- Country: Denmark
- Language: Danish
- Box office: 398,518 admissions (Denmark)

Stolen Spring (Danish: Det Forsømte Forår) is a 1993 Danish film adaptation of Hans Scherfig's novel The Stolen Spring directed by Peter Schrøder. It was the most popular Danish film of the year and the third most popular film in Denmark behind Jurassic Park and The Bodyguard.

Stolen Spring was shot in 1993 starring some of the biggest stars in Danish Cinema, such as Frits Helmuth.

The book is a collective novel, in that the protagonist isn't a single person, but rather a group. Some critics think that the movie remake has failed to retain this and other thematics, and therefore does not deliver Scherfig's socialist message.

== Cast ==
- Frits Helmuth as Professor Blomme
- Tomas Villum Jensen as Edvard Ellerstrøm (young) (as Tomas Willum Jensen)
- Jesper Langberg as Edvard Ellerstrøm (adult)
- Adam Simonsen as Michael Mogensen (young)
- Hugo Øster Bendtsen as Michael Mogensen (adult)
- René Hansen as Thygesen (young)
- Lars Lohmann as Thygesen (adult)
- Ken Vedsegaard as Aksel Nielsen (young)
- Litten Hansen as Fru Svendsen
