= At World's End =

At World's End may refer to:

- Pirates of the Caribbean: At World's End, a 2007 American epic fantasy swashbuckler film
- At World's End (2009 film), a Danish action comedy film
