= Metropolitanskolen =

Former school in Copenhagen, Denmark

Coordinates: 55.6892°N 12.5456°E

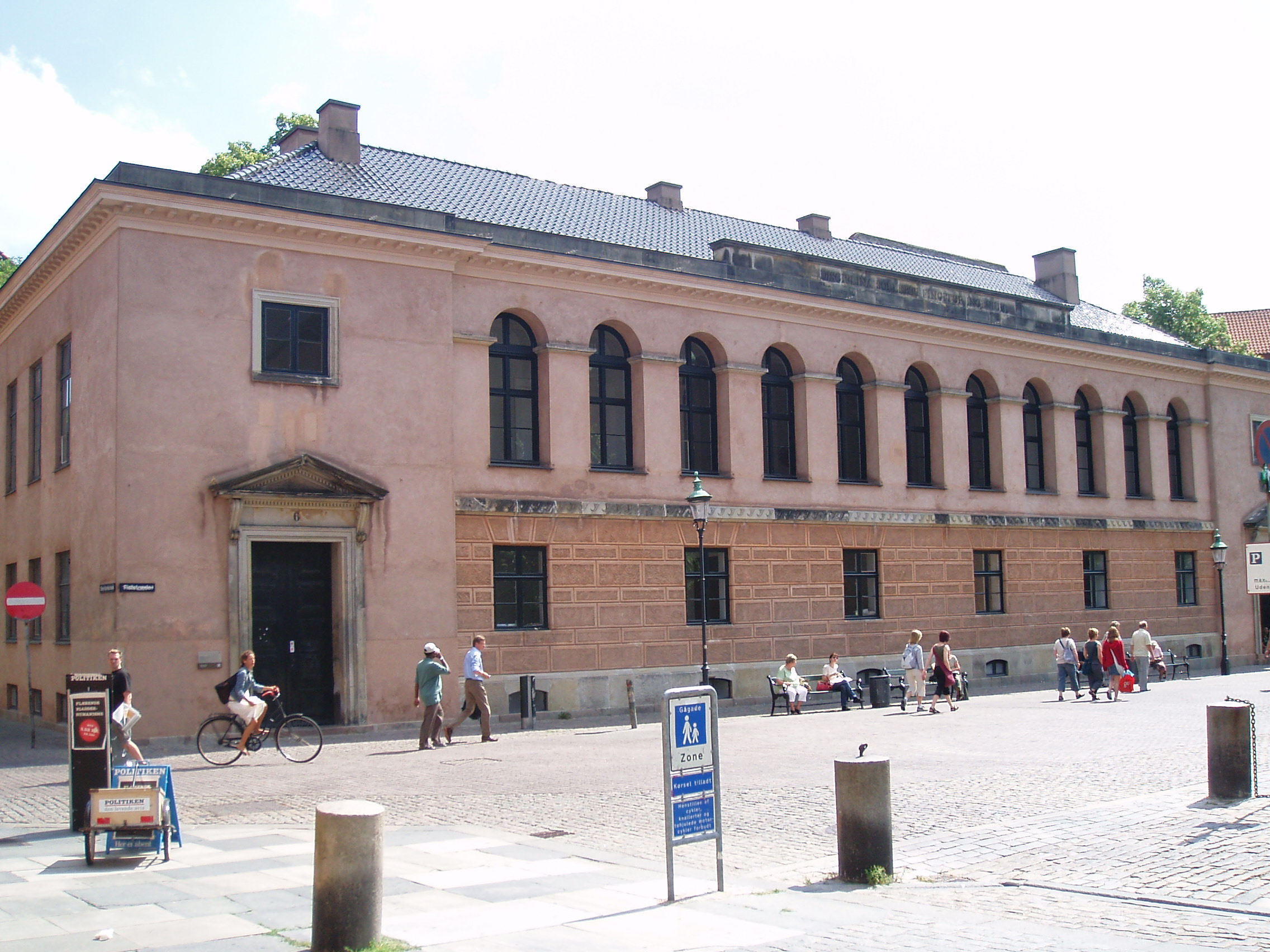
The building that housed Metropolitanskolen from 1728 to 1938.

Metropolitanskolen ("The Metropolitan School") was a school in Copenhagen, Denmark founded in 1209 by the Bishop Peder Sunesen, and for centuries one of the most prestigious schools in the country.

== History ==
The school was founded in 1209 next to the Church of Our Lady built at the same time by Peder Sunesen, Bishop of Roskilde, and was named "The School of Our Lady" (Vor Frue Skole) or the "Cathedral School" (Domskolen). In 1802 it was renamed The Latin Cathedral School of Copenhagen (Kjøbenhavns Latinske Cathedralskole), but this caused problems since there was already one Cathedral School in the bishopric, that in Roskilde. So in 1817 it was renamed The Metropolitan School (Metropolitanskolen). In 1728 the building burned and was reconstructed in its current form. In 1838 the school left its original building on Vor Frue Plads, to move to a larger building in Struenseegade on Nørrebro, the original building was taken over by the University of Copenhagen. In 2010, one year after its 800 anniversary, the school was united with another school to form Gefion Gymnasium.

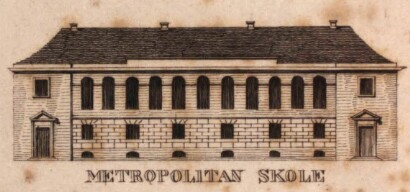
Rendering from 1810

During its years of functioning hundreds of prominent Danes graduated from the school, and it acquired iconic status as the school portrayed in Hans Scherfig's famous novel, "Stolen Spring" (Det Forsømte Forår).

== Notable alumni ==
- 1984 - Mads Mikkelsen, actor
- 1985 - Lars Mikkelsen, actor
- 1933 - Svend Asmussen, jazz violinist
- 1923 - K. E. Løgstrup, theologian
- 1910 - Kaj Birket-Smith, philologist and anthropologist
- 1895 - Ove Jørgensen, philologist and ballet critic
- 1889 - Christian X of Denmark, King of Denmark
- 1865 - Holger Drachmann, poet and painter
