= The Killings of Copenhagen =

Episode of Midsomer Murders

The Killings of Copenhagen is the 100th episode of the British TV series Midsomer Murders. The episode is also the first where a murder takes place outside the United Kingdom, and only the second outside the fictitious county of Midsomer (the first being in Brighton, East Sussex in the 75th episode). It was filmed and produced in late autumn 2013. In the UK this episode first aired on 12 February 2014.

== Plot ==
Midsomer biscuit tycoon Eric Calder stays at a hotel located at the large City Hall Square (Rådhuspladsen) during a visit to Copenhagen. He receives and opens what appears to be an empty biscuit tin. However, he becomes dizzy, and after an attempt to wash his hands, he falls down dead.

As the goods were sent from Midsomer, Danish detective Birgitte Poulsen asks Barnaby to investigate. DCI Barnaby and DS Nelson start their investigation at home, but when a second body ends up at a Danish biscuit factory in a shipment from Midsomer, they have to take a flight across the North Sea. Barnaby is in a hurry to finish because his wife Sarah is nearing her due date.

Barnaby, Nelson, and their Danish counterparts uncover a second life for the first victim in Copenhagen, one that circles back to Midsomer. They arrive too late to stop two more murders, but triumph in the end.

== Production ==
As the show's special 100th episode, the episode was set in part in Denmark in recognition of the popularity of Danish crime dramas such as The Killing in the UK, and of Midsomer Murders in Denmark. The plot revolves around a recipe for Danish-style butter cookies, and includes elements borrowed from Shakespeare's Hamlet, which takes place in Denmark.

== Cast and other credits ==
- DCI John Barnaby - Neil Dudgeon
- DS Charlie Nelson - Gwilym Lee
- VKK Birgitte Poulsen - Ann Eleonora Jørgensen
- KA Anna Degn - Birgitte Hjort Sørensen
- Eric Calder - Marcus Hutton
- Penelope Calder - Caroline Goodall
- Ingrid Madsen - Marie Askehave
- Harry Calder - Jonathan Barnwell
- Julian Calder - Adrian Lukis
- Armand Stone - Sanjeev Bhaskar
- Summer Haleston - Poppy Drayton
- Clara Trout - Joanna Scanlan
- Atticus Bradley - Richard Cordery
- Ernest Bradley - Nicholas Jones
- Albert Toft - Thomas Thorøe
- Sofie Bruun - Julie Agnete Vang
- Thomas Madsen - Nicolaj Kopernikus
- Sarah Barnaby - Fiona Dolman
- Dr. Kate Wilding - Tamzin Malleson
- Screenplay - Paul Logue
- Produced by - Louise Sutton
- Directed by - Alex Pillai
