= Anders Westenholz =

Danish psychologist and writer

Anders Westenholz (October 21, 1936 – November 21, 2010) was a Danish psychologist and writer.

== Overview ==
Anders Westenholz became a student in 1955, and a psychologist in 1969. From 1969-76 he was employed by Dansk Arbejdsgiverforening (English: The Confederation of Danish Employers). He's been included in the prestigious Danish book of biographies, Kraks Blå Bog (English: Krak's Blue Book). He's been granted financial support or backing from Statens Kunstfond (English: Danish Arts Agency) eight times throughout his career as a writer. In 1974 he received the RAI Prix Italia for his radio play Skriget fra Golgatha (English: The Scream from Golgatha). In 1981 he received Gyldendals Boglegat (English: Gyldendal's Book Grant) and in 1988 Johannes Ewalds Legat (English: Johannes Ewald's Grant).

== His works ==
Anders Westenholz' works are generally divided into four groups: works of fiction, works on psychology, biographical works on Danish Sumatra rubber plantation manager Vilhelm Jung and works on his own famous great aunt Karen Blixen's life and works. He is credited as the ideas man behind two episodes of the popular Danish TV-series Huset på Christianshavn, namely #64, Karlas kald (English: Karla's Calling), scripted by Karen Smith and #68, Dagen efter dagen derpå (English: The Day after the Following Day), scripted by Henning Bahs.

As a writer of fiction he has written poetry, short stories, novels and plays (mostly for radio), and in genres he has dealt with both social realism and the fantastic. During his authorship he has experimented a lot with genres and language structures, which led famous Danish writer and critic Poul Borum (1934–1996) to write about him in a review: "Anders Westenholz is difficult to read, but worth every effort".

Anders Westenholz's authorship focuses on speculative genres, including fantasy and New Age literature. Writing for both youth and adult audiences, he is among the Danish authors who write speculative literature, such as fantasy, sci-fi, and horror, for older readers alongside authors such as Erwin Neutzsky-Wulff.

Apart from his work as a writer of his own accord, Anders Westenholz has also worked as a translator. His work in this regard includes the translations of the American Dungeons & Dragons-related fantasy series DragonLance Chronicles and DragonLance Legends by Margaret Weis & Tracy Hickman as well as a number of works by Stephen King.

== Bibliography ==
=== Works of fiction ===
- Polyp (English: Polyp), novel, 1968
- Martyrium (English: Martyrdom), novel, 1970
- [Title unknown], short story in the anthology Og: en tekstantologi (English: And: A Text Anthology), 1971
- Det syvende æg (English: The Seventh Egg), novel, 1972
- Stueantennen (English: The Indoor Aerial), radio play, 1972
- Venskab, evt. ægteskab (English: Friendship, Possibly Marriage), radio play, 1972
- Skriget fra Golgatha (English: The Scream from Golgatha), radio play, 1973
- Glasmuren (English: The Glass Wall), novel, 1981
- Solen er kommet nærmere: digtcyklus (English: The Sun Has Come Closer: Cycle of Poems), poetry, 1983
- Den gamle fra havet (English: The Old One from the Sea), short story in the anthology At ønske en pludselig forvandling: ny dansk prosa (English: To Wish For A Sudden Change: New Danish Prose); ed. Uffe Andreasen og Erik Skyum-Nielsen, 1983
- Genkomsten (English: The Second Coming), novel, 1984
- Kommer straks (English: Won't Be A Minute), novel, 1984 - with Norman Lindtner
- Så I røgen? (English: Did You See the Smoke?), novel, 1985 - with Norman Lindtner
- Teknisk uheld (English: Technical Hitch), novel, 1986 - with Norman Lindtner
- Den Udvalgte (English: The Chosen), novel, 1986
- Den sorte influenza (English: The Black Flue), novel, Gyldendal, 1987
- Avinags kærlighed: radiospil i 2 dele (English: Avinag's Love: Radio Play in 2 Parts), radio play, 1987
- Søhestenes dal: roman i tre forspil og et coitus interruptus (English: Valley of the Seahorses: Novel in Three Foreplays and a Coitus Interruptus), novel, 1990
- Rubindragernes kyst (English: Shore of the Ruby Dragons), novel, 1993
- Dødesange (English: Death Songs), poetry, 1995
- Fluernes farve (English: Colour of the Flies), novel, 1996
- Fædrenes synder (English: Sins of the Fathers), novel, 2003
- Fanget i tiden (English: Caught in Time), novel, 2004 - sammen med Damián Arguimbau
- LæseLyst 13: Mona Lisa på afveje (English: Love of Reading 13: Mona Lisa Gone Astray) novel; part of an easily readable book series targeted for challenged readers, 2005

=== Works on psychology ===
- Hvad er meningen?: over- og undertoner i den daglige samtale (English: What's the Point?: Over- and Undertones in Daily Conversation), about interpersonal communication, 1990
- Tale er guld: mere om over- og undertoner i den daglige samtale (English: Speech is Golden: More about Over- and Undertones in Daily Conversation), about interpersonal communication, 1991
- Hvilken psykoterapi skal jeg vælge? (English: What Kind of Psychotherapy Should I Choose?), patient guide on psychotherapy, 2004

=== Works on Karen Blixen ===
- Den glemte abe: mand og kvinde hos Karen Blixen (English: The Forgotten Monkey: Mand and Woman in Karen Blixen), 1985
- The Power of Aries: myth and reality in Karen Blixen's life, Louisiana State University Press, 1987; translated from Danish: Kraftens horn: myte og virkelighed i Karen Blixens liv, published in 1982

=== Works on Vilhelm Jung ===
- Sådan gik det til (English: That's How It Happened), biography, 1988 - with Vilhelm Jung
- Det var det (English: That Was That), biography, 1989 - with Vilhelm Jung
- Så er det nok (English: That's Enough), biography, 1990 - with Vilhelm Jung

=== Other works ===
- Kolde Fødder (English: Cold Feet), play, never printed, 1974
- Det er absolut relativt: føre og uføre i moderne fysik (English: It's Absolutely Relative: Vice and Virtue in Modern Physics), science critique, 2001

== See also ==
- Karen Blixen
- Dennis Jürgensen
- Svend Åge Madsen
- Erwin Neutzsky-Wulff
