= The One and Only (1999 film) =

Den Eneste Ene
- Theatrical release poster
- Directed by: Susanne Bier
- Written by: Kim Fupz Aakeson
- Produced by: Thomas Heinesen
- Starring: Sidse Babett Knudsen; Niels Olsen; Rafael Edholm; Søs Egelind; Lars Kaalund; Paprika Steen; Sofie Gråbøl
- Cinematography: Jens Schlosser
- Edited by: Mogens Hagedorn Christiansen
- Production company: Metronome Productions
- Distributed by: Sandrew Metronome
- Release date: 1 April 1999
- Running time: 106 minutes
- Country: Denmark
- Language: Danish
- Box office: $5.5 million (Denmark)

The One and Only (Danish: Den Eneste Ene) is a 1999 Danish romantic comedy film directed by Susanne Bier. The film starred Sidse Babett Knudsen, Niels Olsen, Rafael Edholm, and Paprika Steen in story about two unfaithful married couples faced with becoming first-time parents. The film was considered to mark a modern transition in Danish romantic comedies, and became the third biggest box-office success of the 1990s in Denmark. The film earned both the Robert Award and Bodil Award as the Best Film of 1999.

== Cast ==
- Sidse Babett Knudsen as Sus
- Niels Olsen as Niller
- Paprika Steen as Stella
- Søs Egelind as Lizzie
- Sofie Gråbøl as Mulle
- Lars Kaalund as Knud
- Rafael Edholm as Andrea aka Sonny
- Hella Joof as the adoption lady
- Liv Corfixen as beauty clinic customer
- Charlotte Munck as beauty clinic customer
- Klaus Bondam as Priest
- Lars Kjeldgaard as one of the couples with new kitchen
- Jacob Thuesen as one of the couples with new kitchen
- Vanessa Gouri as Mgala
- Jan Hertz as the Doctor
- Berrit Kvorning Beauty clinic chief

== Box office ==
The film was the most successful Danish film for 15 years with admissions of 820,000 and a gross of 38.5 million Krone ($5.5 million) in Denmark.
