= Dennis Jürgensen =

Danish writer

Dennis Jürgensen (born 3 February 1961) is one of the most popular Danish writers for kids and young adults. A study among Danish kids from 11 to 18 years showed that 90% knew who Jürgensen was and the fanclub has many members.

== Writing style ==
Jürgensen is mostly a writer for the youth but as he has said himself some of his books should be considered to be for adults. He has written in almost any genre but his most preferred genres are fantasy, science fiction and horror or a combination of those three. But he has al so written crime-books, books about love and realistic novels.

Humor is an ongoing feature, a thing he focuses a lot on. One of his idols, Stephen King, once said his biggest wish was that someone would die of terror after reading his book. To that Jürgensen has remarked that his biggest wish is that someone will laugh so hard from reading his book that people in the bus will turn around and look at them.

== Personal life and career ==
He grew up in Brønshøj near Copenhagen (today he's living in Rødovre), he was doing okay in school with the exception being Danish. He drifted around after taking his exam in 1978 and tried unsuccessfully to send manuscripts to various publishers. But during the summer of 1981 Kristian Tellerup from the publishing company Tellerup answered to one of his scripts, Love at First Hiccup, a youth-novel about love and of course a lot humor. It was published the same autumn and was an enormous success and has since been reprinted 20 times. It was later put to the screen in 1999 and became a big success in Denmark. Since then he has written more than 50 novels and made four feature films, for example an adaptation of his Kærlighed ved første hik, starring Robert Hansen and Sofie Lassen-Kahlke.

Feature films with Dennis Jürgensen as screenwriter:

- Sidste Time (1995)
- Mørkeleg (1996)
- Kærlighed Ved Første Hik (1999)
- Bag Det Stille Ydre (2005)

Jürgensen doesn't often make appearances on mainstream media. However, on 22 August 2014 he was guest on the radio programme Syvkabalen on national radio Radio24Syv, where he openly elaborated on his work as an author and motivations.

== Bibliography ==
These are the Danish titles of the books that have been printed.

- Kærlighed ved første hik (1981)
- Er du blød mand (1982)
- Balladen om den forsvundne mumie (1982)
- Brædder til Draculas kiste (1983)
- Djævelens hule (1983)
- Bøvsedragens hemmelighed (1984)
- Jord i hovedet (1984)
- Grønne øjne (1985)
- Blodspor i Transsylvanien (1986)
- Flyskræk (1986)
- Gargoylens gåde (1986)
- Stormesteren (1987)
- Bøvl med bandagerne (1988)
- Knusumkranium (Krøniker fra kvæhl 1) (1988)
- Vampyrtroldene (Krøniker fra kvæhl 2) (1988)
- Æzurvin slår til (Krøniker fra kvæhl 3) (1988)
- Midnatstimen (1989)
- Dystopia (1989)
- Heksens ansigt (Krøniker fra kvæhl 4) (1990)
- Lusingandos fælde (Krøniker fra kvæhl 5) (1990)
- Jeg, en nørd (1990)
- Snevampyren (1991)
- Sorte Ragn rider igen (1991)
- Kadavermarch (1991)
- Tingen i cellen (1992)
- Mirakler udføres (1992)
- Benny og Brian med ketchup og sennep (1993)
- Monstret i kælderen (1993)
- Relief (1993)
- Måske (1994)
- Ikke en fjer bedre (1995)
- Sidste time (1995)
- Mørkeleg (1996)
- Benny og Brian møder den sorte julemand (1996)
- De hængte mænds hus (1997)
- Et grimm’t eventyr (1997)
- Uhyret i brønden (1998)
- Gylperen (1999)
- Hår(d) (1999)
- Maskiner sanser ikke hud (Machines don't Sense Skin) (2000)
- De kom fra blodsumpen 2 (with Patrick Leis) (They Came from the Blood Swamp 2) (2001)
- Evighedens port (Drømmetjenerne 1) (Gate of Eternity, The Dream Waiters 1) (2002)
- Mandators Kappe (Drømmetjenerne 2) (The Cape of Mandators, The Dream Waiters 2) (2004)
- Ondskabens Dimension (Drømmetjenerne 3) (The Dimension of Evil, The Dream Waiters 3) (2005)
- Den Gyldne By (Drømmetjenerne 4) (The Golden City, The Dream Waiters 4) (2006)
- Kadaverjagt (Hunting Corpses) (2006)
- Sagen om de japanske dræbergardiner (Spøgelseslinien 1) (The case of the Japanese Killer Curtains, Ghost Hotline 1) (2003)
- Sagen om det blodige vampyrtrick (Spøgelseslinien 2) (The case of the Bloody Vampire Trick, Ghost Hotline 2) (2004)
- Sagen om Ugledrengens afklippede klo (Spøgelseslinien 3) (The case of the Owl Boy's Cut Off Hook, Ghost Hotline 3) (2007)
- Dæmonen i hælene (Daemon by the Heels) (2007)
- Sagen om det galoperende maleri (Spøgelseslinien 4) (The case of the Galloping Painting, Ghost Hotline 4) (2008)
- Sagen om den brændende klovn (Spøgelseslinien 5) (The case of the Burning Clown, Ghost Hotline 5) (2008)
- Tunnelmanden (The Tunnel Man) (2010)
- Kælderkrigerne (The Cellar Warriors) (2010)
- Løbende Tjener (Running Waiter) (2014) (Roland Triel #1)
- Dansende Røde Bjørne (2015) (Roland Triel #2)
- Hviskende Lig (2016) (Roland Triel #3)
- Marcherende Myrer (2017) (Roland Triel #4)
- Eksploderende Skadedyr (2018) (Roland Triel #5)
- Faldende Masker (2019) (Roland Triel #6)
- Mand Uden Ansigt (2021) (Teit & Lehmann #1)
- Bloddue (2022) (Teit & Lehmann #2)
- Ormegården (2024) (Teit & Lehmann #3)
- Den Dobbelte Kommissær (2025) (Teit & Lehmann #4)

== Books about Dennis Jürgensen ==
- Drager, damer & dæmoner - en guide til Dennis Jürgensens univers, M. F. Clasen, Tellerup, 2002

== See also ==
- Anders Westenholz, another Danish writer of fantasy and other fantastic literature.
