= One-Hand Clapping =

2001 Danish comedy film

One-hand Clapping
- Theatrical release poster
- Directed by: Gert Fredholm
- Written by: Gert Fredholm; Gert Duve Skovlund; Mikael Olsen
- Produced by: Mikael Olsen
- Starring: Jens Okking; Peter Gantzler; Susanne Juhász
- Cinematography: Lars Skree
- Edited by: Molly Malene Stensgaard
- Music by: Jon Bruland; Ole Arnfred
- Production company: Zentropa
- Distributed by: Sandrew Metronome
- Release date: 17 August 2001 (Denmark)
- Running time: 94 minutes
- Country: Denmark
- Language: Danish

One-Hand Clapping (Danish: At klappe med een hånd) is a 2001 Danish comedy film written and directed by Gert Fredholm, and starring Jens Okking, Peter Gantzler, and Susanne Juhász. The film was produced by Zentropa.

== Plot ==
Erik Svensson is a wealthy but aging businessman whose wife has finally died after years of serious illness. He is now able to sell his company and plans a life in luxury in Spain with his beautiful girlfriend Helene. Just before departure, he receives a letter from a former mistress claiming that he is the father of her daughter. He hires the undertaker Anders as his chauffeur and together they set out to investigate the claim.

== Cast ==
- Jens Okking as Svensson
- Peter Gantzler as Anders
- Susanne Juhász as Heidi
- Michelle Bjørn-Andersen as Lotte
- Ann Eleonora Jørgensen as Helene
- Jesper Christensen as H.C. Krøyer
- Elsebeth Steentoft as Elisabeth

== Accolades ==
The film was nominated both for a Bodil and Robert award for Best Danish Film, and Jens Okking won the Bodil Award for Best Actor in a Leading Role for his performance.
