= Oldboys =

- Directed by: Nikolaj Steen
- Starring: Kristian Halken; Robert Hansen
- Release date: 20 November 2009
- Running time: 95 minutes
- Country: Denmark
- Language: Danish

Oldboys is a 2009 Danish comedy film directed by Nikolaj Steen. The film was awarded the Audience Award at the 2010 Karlovy Vary International Film Festival.

== Cast ==
- Kristian Halken - Vagn Bendtsen
- Robert Hansen - John Lund
- Laura Christensen - Jeanne
- Rasmus Bjerg - Henrik B
- Leif Sylvester Petersen - Svend Erik
- Ole Thestrup - Bent
- Elith Nulle Nykjær - Erling
- Niels Skousen - Preben
- Bodil Jørgensen - Bente

== Plot ==
Vagn is a middle-aged man whose life has slowly ground to a halt. He lives by himself, has a job and plays old boys' football. On the annual team trip to Sweden, the other members of the team forget him at a gas station. As Vagn well knows, he is all too forgettable. Throwing his lot in with a hapless robber, John, he hustles to catch up with the team bus, beginning a journey that slowly but surely brings him out of himself and back among the living.
