= Niels Olsen =

Danish actor (born 1960)

- Born: 8 March 1960 (age 66); Aarhus, Denmark
- Occupation: Actor
- Years active: 1990–present
- Awards: Robert Award (2000)

Niels Olsen (born 8 March 1960) is a Danish actor. He has appeared in many films and TV series, as well as on stage, including as part of the musical/comedy group Ørkenens Sønner ("Sons of the Desert"). He came to prominence for his role as Niller in the 1999 film The One and Only.

== Early life and education ==
Niels Olsen was born on 8 March 1960 in Aarhus, Denmark.

== Career ==
Olsen has appeared in many films and TV series.

From the 1990s, he performed as part of the musical/comedy group Ørkenens Sønner ("Sons of the Desert") together with Henrik Koefoed, Søren Pilmark, and Asger Reher, who performed at the Bellevue Theatre for a number of years.

He has also performed in revues at the annual Cirkusrevyen, from 1995 until the present day (2025).

== Accolades ==
In 2000, Olsen won a Robert Award for Best Actor in a Leading Role for his role as Niller in the 1999 film The One and Only.

== Selected filmography ==
Year	Title	Role	Notes
1999	The One and Only	Niller	
2001	Min søsters børn	Father	
2002	Open Hearts	Finn	
2003	Move Me	Holger	
2004	Brothers	Allentoft	
2005	The Sun King		
2006	Clash of Egos		
