= Elves (TV series) =

Danish fantasy television series

- Danish: Nisser
- Genre: Horror fantasy drama
- Created by: Stefan Jaworski
- Written by: Stefan Jaworski
- Directed by: Roni Ezra
- Starring: Sonja Sofie Engberg Steen; Milo Campanale; Vivelill Søgaard Holm; Lila Nobel; Peder Thomas Pedersen; Ann Eleonora Jørgensen; Rasmus Hammeric
- Composers: Anthony Lledo; Mikkel Maltha
- Country of origin: Denmark
- Original language: Danish
- No. of seasons: 1
- No. of episodes: 6

Production
- Executive producers: Jonas Allen; Peter Bose; Stefan Jaworski; Jannik Tai Mosholt; Christian Potalivo
- Producer: Elise H. Lund
- Production location: Denmark
- Cinematography: Lars Reinholdt
- Editors: Michael Bauer; Ida Bregninge; Dan Loghin
- Running time: 22–26 minutes
- Production company: Miso Film

Original release
- Network: Netflix
- Release: 28 November 2021

Elves (Danish: Nisser) is a Danish horror-fantasy-drama streaming television series created by Stefan Jaworski. The first season, containing six episodes, premiered on Netflix on 28 November 2021.

== Background ==
The series was first announced on 6 October 2020. Stefan Jaworski had previously created the show The Rain.

== Synopsis ==
A Danish family travels to the remote island of Aarmandsø to spend Christmas together, away from the city. Unbeknownst to them, the island is inhabited by carnivorous elves. The protagonist of the story and youngest member of the family, Jose, befriends a stranded baby elf, whom they hit with their car while driving to their rented house. Jose names the elf Kee-ko. When the elves start killing people, the family has to fight for their lives.

== Cast and characters ==
- Sonja Sofie Engberg Steen as Jose Svane, a young girl who befriends a baby elf
- Milo Campanale as Kasper, Jose's brother
- Vivelill Søgaard Holm as Liv, an island local
- Lila Nobel as Charlotte, Jose's mother
- Peder Thomas Pedersen as Mads: Jose's father
- Ann Eleonora Jørgensen as Karen, an island local, Liv's grandmother
- Rasmus Hammeric as Møller, an island local and Liv's uncle
- Lukas Løkken as Anders, an island local

== Episodes ==
| No. | Title | Directed by | Written by | Original release date |
|---|---|---|---|---|
| 1 | "Aarmand Island" | Roni Ezra | Stefan Jaworski | 28 November 2021 |
| 2 | "Creature from the Woods" | Roni Ezra | Stefan Jaworski | 28 November 2021 |
| 3 | "The Secret" | Roni Ezra | Stefan Jaworski | 28 November 2021 |
| 4 | "Beyond the Fence" | Roni Ezra | Stefan Jaworski | 28 November 2021 |
| 5 | "The Outbreak" | Roni Ezra | Stefan Jaworski | 28 November 2021 |
| 6 | "The Sacrifice" | Roni Ezra | Stefan Jaworski | 28 November 2021 |

== Reception ==
The series received mixed reviews. The Guardian gave it a score of 2/5, describing it as "E.T. meets the Wicker Man as murderous gnomes run amok," and described it as "tropey" and "bland". CBR said that it was "too cute" to be considered a horror series, and that it was missing a lot of key elements. The Michigan Daily stated that it becomes increasingly hard to sympathize with Josephine as the series progresses, and said, "(the series) could use some improvement and possibly more likeable characters, but it most definitely doesn't lack creativity. Its chilling and unsettling twist on Christmas is not a familiar phenomenon when it comes to the screen. So while this six-episode fantastical horror may not be Netflix's next acclaimed sci-fi series, it is an addicting watch nonetheless. Nordic Watch praised the series, saying, "combining a Christmas family drama with fantasy, folklore, and horror – on a par with your scariest Doctor Who episode – the series is both disturbingly freaky and heart-warming fun."

In December 2021, Elves was in the top ten most viewed series on Netflix.

== See also ==
- List of Christmas films
- Danish folklore
- Old Norse religion
