= Thue Ersted Rasmussen =

Danish actor (born 1985)

- Born: 15 November 1985 (age 40); Aalborg, Denmark
- Occupation: Actor
- Years active: 2008, 2013–present

Thue Ersted Rasmussen (born 15 November 1985) is a Danish actor.

== Filmography ==
=== Film ===
Year	Title	Role	Notes
2008	Snooze	Kim	Short film
2013	Patienten	Tv-Vært	Short film
2013	The Shooter	Journalistelev	
2014	Ambrosia	Journalist	Short film
2015	Dead End	Jacob	Short film
2016	X	Agent	Short film
2018	Så længe jeg lever	Lennart	a.k.a. The Way to Mandalay
2019	Kollision	Galleri ejer	
2021	F9	Otto	
2022	Toscana	Construction Expert	
2023	Asphalt	Police (voice)	
2023	Hygge!	Fabian	

=== Television ===
Year	Title	Role	Notes
2013	Dicte	Peter Boutrup	4 episodes
2017	Norskov	Danny	5 episodes
2017	Greyzone	Dad at Playground	Episode: "Hjemkomst" ("The Return")
2018	29	Mand på bænk	Episode: "Hvordan kommer man videre?" ("How to Proceed?")
2018	Løbeklubben	Ekspedient	2 episodes
2018	Grow	Laust	1 episode
2018–2022	Sygeplejeskolen	Christian Friis	30 episodes
2019–2023	Sunday	Jonas	39 episodes
2020	Ambassadøren	Axel	10 episodes
2021	FBI: International	Leland Schmid	Episode: "Secrets as Weapons"
2023	Shadow and Bone	Ahlgren	3 episodes
2023	Oxen	Martin Rytter	5 episodes
