= Inch'Allah Dimanche =

2001 film by Yamina Benguigui

Inch'Allah dimanche
- Directed by: Yamina Benguigui
- Written by: Yamina Benguigui
- Produced by: Bachir Deraïs; Philippe Dupuis-Mendel
- Starring: Fejria Deliba
- Cinematography: Antoine Roch
- Distributed by: ARP Sélection; Divisa Home Video (Spain); Film Movement (USA)
- Release date: September 14, 2001
- Running time: 96 min.
- Countries: France; Algeria
- Languages: Algerian Arabic, French
- Budget: $2.7 million
- Box office: $368,500

Inch'Allah Dimanche (Arabic: إن شاء الله الأحد, romanized: Inna Shāʼa Allāh al-Aḥad, English: Sunday God Willing) is a 2001 French/Algerian film written and directed by Yamina Benguigui. It is the director's first feature-length fiction film, and the story is centred around the life of an Algerian immigrant woman in France. The film won a number of awards, including the FIPRESCI Prize at the Toronto International Film Festival.

== Cast ==
- Fejria Deliba – Zouina
- Rabia Mokeddem – Aïcha, mother
- Amina Annabi – Malika
- Anass Behri – Ali
- Hamza Dubuih – Rachid
- Zinedine Soualem – Ahmed
- Mathilde Seigner – Nicole Briat
- Marie-France Pisier – Manant
- France Darry – Mrs. Donze (neighbor)
- Roger Dumas – Mr. Donze (neighbor)
- Jalil Lespert – Bus driver

== Plot ==
Zouina's husband, Ahmed, left Algeria in the 1970s to work in France. As part of the French government's Family Reunification law passed by Prime Minister Jacques Chirac in 1974, Zouina is allowed to move to France from Algeria in order to join her husband, Ahmed. After tearfully leaving her mother behind, Zouina, her mother-in-law, Aicha, and their three children move to France. Zouina struggles to cope with life in a new country and different culture but becomes a prisoner to the tyranny of Aicha and her husband's failures to protect her. Zouina also encounters a host of neighbors, some of which intensify the alienation she feels in her new home but many who extend their hand in friendship. Sunday, when her Ahmed routinely takes his mother out for the day, Zouina and the children are able to explore and search for another Algerian family and genuine human contact. Zouina ultimately finds this family after three weeks but suffers a rejection that mirrors being ripped from her home in Algeria and general rejection from her new home in France. Through her journey Zouina gains her own strength, revels in the community of women she finds home in and is comforted by the emerging feminist dialogue she receives through radio talk shows like Ménie Grégoire.

== Production ==
This is Beguigui's first feature-length fiction film, and is based on her family's experience moving to France, as well as the struggles for autonomy Algerian women continue to face. Although she was urged to change the name of the film after the September 11 attacks, she chose to keep the original title, a portion of which is in Algerian Arabic.

=== Music ===
The film contains a variety of French, Algerian Arabic, and Kabyle language music. Many of the tracks are performed by Algerian musician Idir.

1. "Ageggig" – Idir (A. Mouhed, Idir)
2. "Al Laïl" – Alain Blesing (Alain Blesing)
3. "Apache" – The Shadows (Jerry Lordan)
4. "Isefra" – Idir (M. Benhammadouche, Idir)
5. "Djebel" – Aziz Bekhti
6. "Cenud" – Nourredine Chenoud
7. "Snitraw" – Idir
8. "Le Premier Bonheur du Jour" – Françoise Hardy (Franck Gerald, Jean Renard)
9. "Djin" – Alain Blesing
10. "Temzi (Mon Enfance)" – Hamou (Hamou, Ben Mohamed, Eric Amah, Caroline Pascaud-Blandin)
11. "Sssendu" – Idir
12. "Raoul" – Souad Massi

== Release ==
Inch'Allah Dimanche had its world premiere on September 14, 2001, at Toronto International Film Festival. It was also screened at the International Festival of Women in Cinema (then at Arcachon; later moved and renamed Bordeaux International Festival of Women in Cinema), Marrakech International Film Festival, Amiens International Film Festival, Reel Dame Film Festival, Crossroads Film Festival, and Cairo International Film Festival.

The film was released in cinemas across France on December 5, 2001, and played 79 cinemas across three weeks.

== Reception ==
Inch'Allah Dimanche received mixed reviews. Review aggregator Rotten Tomatoes only showed two critics' reviews, giving it a score of 71%.

Lisa Nesselson of Variety worte "Narrative is often bittersweet but never dreary. Nicely rendered period design jolts the viewer with reminders that provincial France in the mid-'70s was still closer to WWII than to the present and that today's relatively harmonious multicultural society was hard won indeed." She reported that he film had opened in France to mostly positive reviews.

James Travers, writing on Films de France, praised Deliba's performance, but found the film "marred by its excesses", and felt that it could have been more potent if the performances were toned down a bit.

== Awards and accolades ==
- Winner - FIPRESCI Prize (International Society of Film Critics' award for best film) at the Toronto International Film Festival
- Winner of three awards at the International Festival of Women in Cinema, including:
  - Golden Wave Award
  - Audience Choice Award - International Festival of Women in Cinema
  - Best Actress - International Festival of Women in Cinema
- Winner of the Golden Star (Étoile d'or)/Grand prix) at the inaugural Marrakech International Film Festival
- Winner - Special Jury Prize - Amiens International Film Festival
- Nominated - Golden Pyramid - Cairo International Film Festival

The film was Algeria's official submission for the foreign-language film Academy Award.
