= Min søsters børn =

2001 film by Tomas Villum Jensen

- Directed by: Tomas Villum Jensen
- Written by: Michael Asmussen; Søren Frellesen
- Based on: John Habberton's novel Helen's Babies
- Produced by: Michael Obel; Lars Kolvig
- Starring: Peter Gantzler; Wencke Barfoed; Niels Olsen; Lotte Merete Andersen
- Cinematography: Dirk Brüel
- Edited by: Mogens Hagedorn Christiansen
- Music by: Jesper Winge Leisner; Jeppe Kaas
- Distributed by: Sandrew Metronome
- Release date: 2001
- Running time: 86 minutes
- Country: Denmark
- Language: Danish

Min søsters børn (My Sister's Children) is a Danish film from 2001. It was directed by Tomas Villum Jensen, and the screenplay was written by Michael Asmussen and Søren Frellesen. The music for the film was composed by Jesper Winge Leisner and Jeppe Kaas.

== Plot ==
The renowned pediatric psychologist Erik Lund, author of the book Barnlige børns bedrifter (Childish Child's Business), gets the opportunity to test his theories in practice because he must take care of his sister's five very lively children age three to sixteen. The children take the opportunity to get the family's house ready so it does not have to be sold.

== Cast ==
- Peter Gantzler: Uncle Erik
- Wencke Barfoed: Mother
- Niels Olsen: Father
- Lotte Merete Andersen: Mrs. Flinth
- Asger Reher: Mr. Børgesen
- Lene Maria Christensen
- Laura Christensen
- Joachim Knop
- Jeppe Kaas
- Birthe Neumann: real estate agent
- Benedikte Maria Mouritsen: Pusle
- Michael Meyerheim: himself
- Fritz Bjerre Donatzsky-Hansen: Blop
- Neel Rønholt: Amalie
- Lasse Baunkilde: Frederik
- Stefan Pagels Andersen: Jan
- Mikkel Sundø: Michael
- Bubber: himself

== Sequels ==
The film had two sequels, Min søsters børn i sneen (My Sister's Children in the Snow) in 2002 and Min søsters børn i Ægypten (My Sister's Children in Egypt) in 2004.
