= Nikolaj Coster-Waldau =

Danish actor (born 1970)

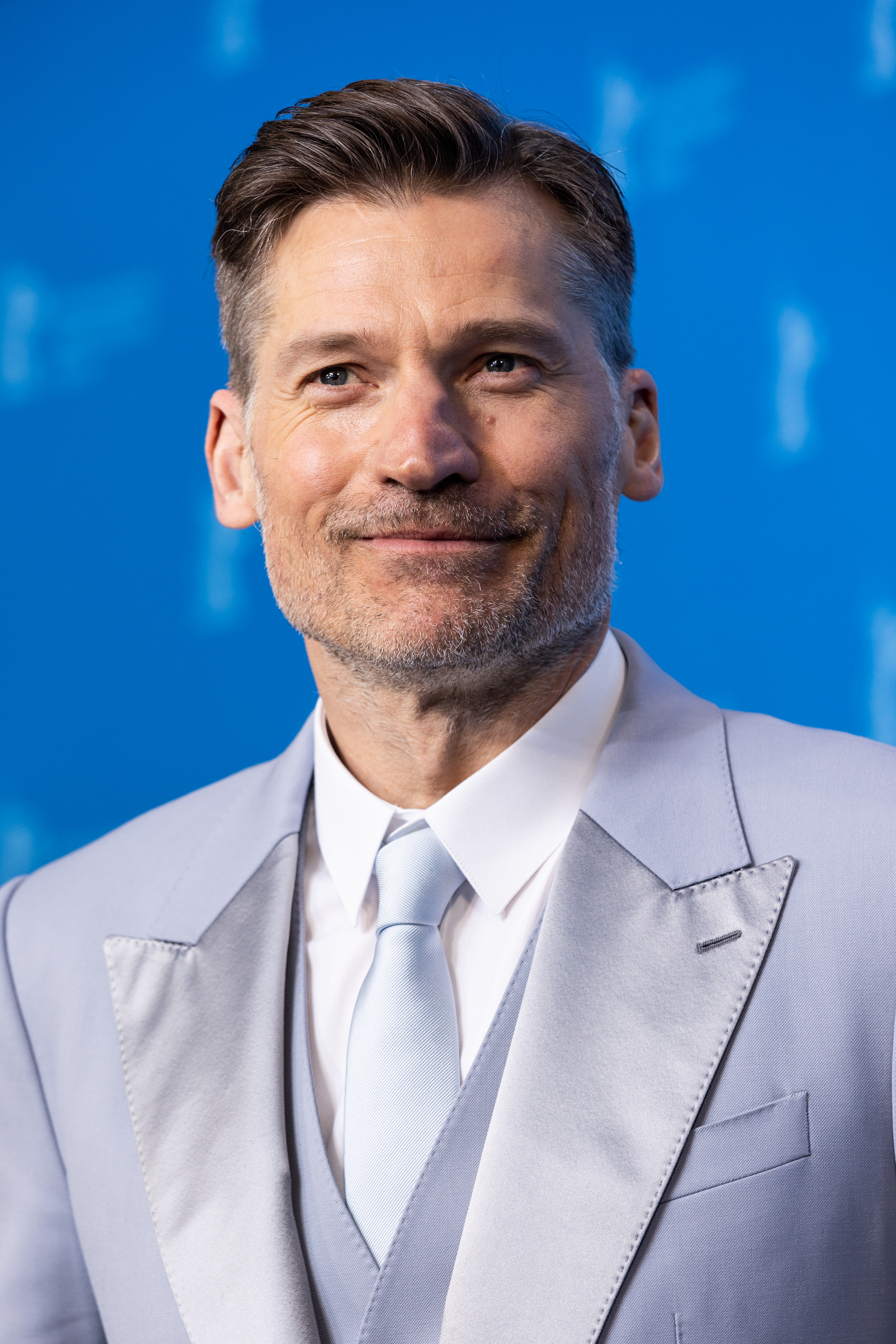
- Coster-Waldau at the 72nd Berlin International Film Festival, 2022
- Born: Nikolaj William Coster-Waldau; 27 July 1970 (age 56); Rudkøbing, Denmark
- Education: Danish National School of Performing Arts
- Occupation: Actor
- Years active: 1993–present
- Spouse: Nukâka Motzfeldt (m. 1998)
- Children: 2
- Relatives: Josef Motzfeldt (father-in-law)

Nikolaj William Coster-Waldau ([ˈne̝koˌlɑjˀ ˈkʰʌstɐ ˈvæltɑw]; born on 27 July 1970) is a Danish actor. His breakthrough role was in Denmark with the film Nightwatch in 1994. He played Jaime Lannister in the HBO fantasy drama series Game of Thrones, for which he received two Primetime Emmy Award nominations for Outstanding Supporting Actor in a Drama Series.

Coster-Waldau has appeared in numerous films in his native Denmark, other Scandinavian countries, and the U.S. These include Headhunters (2011) and A Thousand Times Good Night (2013). In the U.S., his debut film role was in the war film Black Hawk Down (2001), playing Medal of Honor recipient MSG Gary Gordon. He then played a detective in the short-lived Fox television series New Amsterdam (2008), and appeared in the 2009 Fox television film Virtuality, originally intended as a pilot. As of 2021 Coster-Waldau is a UNDP Goodwill Ambassador, drawing public attention to issues such as gender equality and climate change.

== Early life and education ==
Nikolaj William Coster-Waldau was born on 27 July 1970 in Rudkøbing, Denmark, the son of Hanne Søborg Coster (d. 2023), a librarian, and Jørgen Oscar Fritzer Waldau (died 1998), a clerk. He has spoken in interviews about his father's problems with alcohol, as well as his parents' divorce. He has two older sisters, and was raised mainly by his mother, who was a librarian. He grew up in Tybjerg, a small village between Ringsted and Næstved in southern Zealand.

In November 2024 during an interview, Coster-Waldau announced that he, following a DNA-test a few years prior, had discovered that Jørgen Fritzer wasn't his biological father and that he was the result of his mom's affair. Coster-Waldau's biological father was Kjeld Vejrup, television producer, founder of DR's documentary department and former principal of the European Film College in Ebeltoft, Denmark.

Coster-Waldau attended the Danish National School of Performing Arts in Copenhagen (Danish: Statens Teaterskole) from 1989 to 1993.

== Career ==
=== Early career (1993–2000) ===
Coster-Waldau made his stage debut as Laertes in Hamlet at the Betty Nansen Theater. His role in the Danish horror film Nightwatch (Nattevagten, 1994) brought him fame in Denmark. He then went on to play in Simon Staho's Wildside (1998), which he also co-wrote, and starred in the Norwegian film Misery Harbour (1999).

He starred in his first British film Bent, in 1997.

=== U.S. film and television (2001–2010) ===
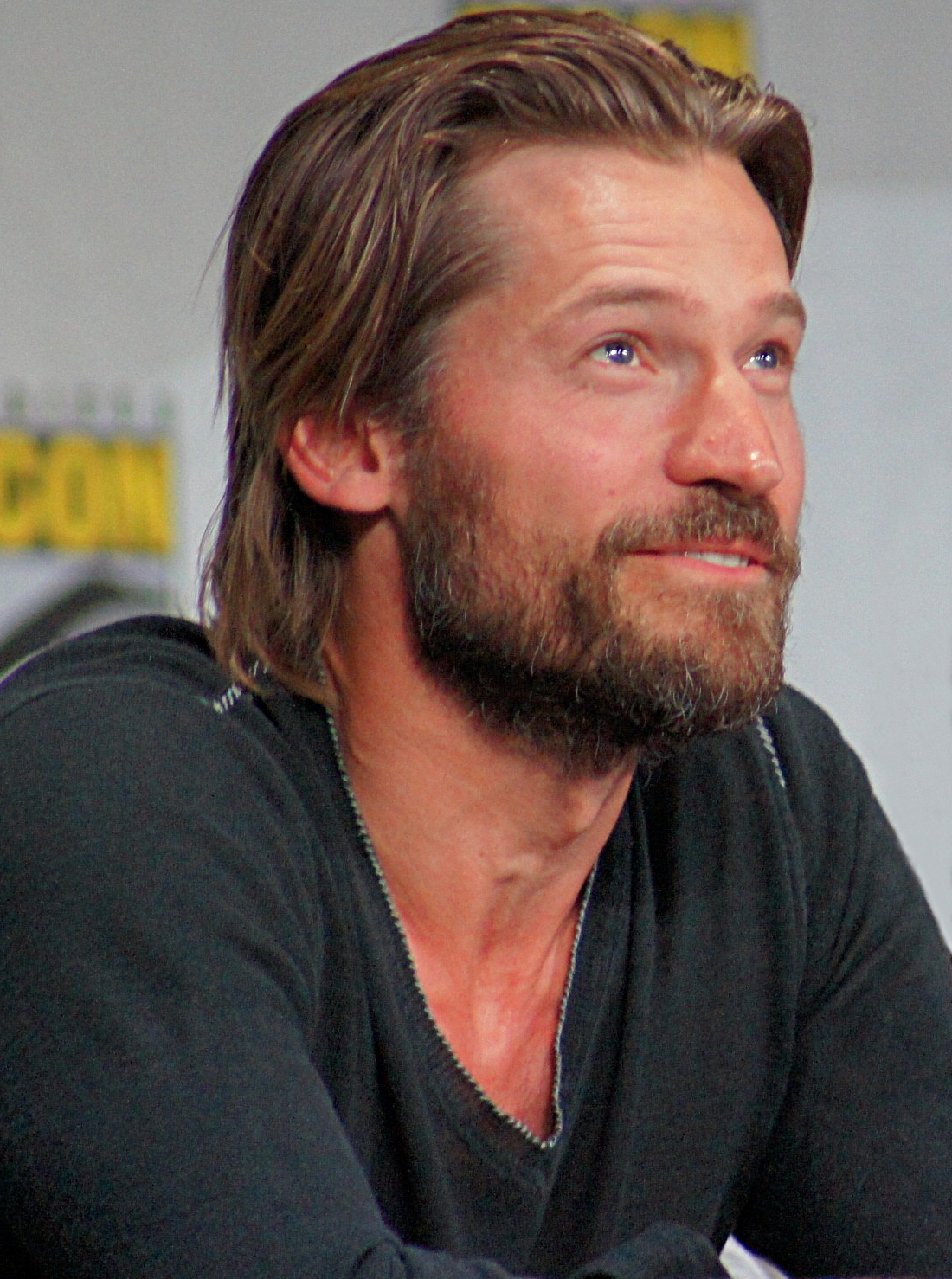
Coster-Waldau at the 2011 San Diego Comic-Con

In 2001, he began his U.S. career in Ridley Scott's Black Hawk Down as Medal of Honor recipient Gary Gordon. Coster-Waldau says "My first U.S. movie was Black Hawk Down and a friend helped me put myself on tape up on the attic over my apartment in Copenhagen. We shipped it out and I got lucky." Coster-Waldau used his success to take roles on both sides of the Atlantic, particularly his native Scandinavia.

He had a leading role in Michael Apted's Enigma and played a villain in the action film My Name is Modesty (2004) (based upon the Modesty Blaise comic strip). Scott brought Coster-Waldau back for the 2005 film Kingdom of Heaven. Richard Loncraine cast Coster-Waldau for Wimbledon (2004) and Firewall (2006). In 2007, he played John Amsterdam, an immortal New York homicide detective who becomes mortal after finding true love, in the short-lived Fox television series New Amsterdam. As a result of filming that series' pilot, Coster-Waldau obtained his Screen Actors Guild card. He later recalled in a 2015 interview in TV Guide, "Finally getting my SAG card was huge for me...I got so excited I went straight to the SAG online shop and bought four mugs with SAG logo. [I] still have those mugs!"

In 2009, he starred in Tomas Villum Jensen's action comedy film At World's End, and appeared in a commercial for the airline carrier Scandinavian Airlines's ad campaign "Så godt som hjemme" (transl. As good as home).

=== Critical success (2011–present) ===
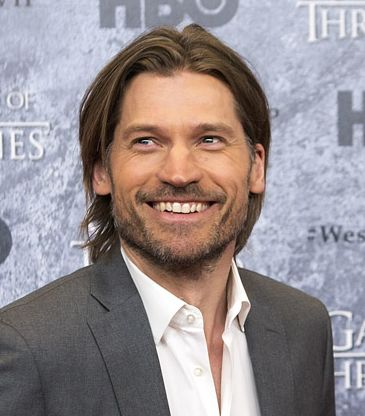
Coster-Waldau at the premiere of the third season of Game of Thrones in March 2013

From 2011 to 2019, Coster-Waldau played Jaime Lannister in the HBO series Game of Thrones, based on George R. R. Martin's fantasy novel series A Song of Ice and Fire. He commented about the character "What's not to like about Jaime? As an actor I couldn't ask for a better role". For his role, he received several accolades, including nominations for Primetime Emmy Award, Screen Actors Guild Award, Critics' Choice Television Award, Saturn Award and People's Choice Award nominations. In 2018, he was among ten prominent characters from the show who was portrayed on a special edition series of stamps in Great Britain.

In 2011, he starred alongside Sam Shepard in Mateo Gil's feature Blackthorn, which premiered at the Tribeca Film Festival. Later the same year he starred in Morten Tyldum's Headhunters. The film went on to be the highest-grossing Norwegian film of all-time and received very positive reviews including a BAFTA Award nomination for Best Foreign Film. Coster-Waldau starred in the 2013 horror film Mama alongside Jessica Chastain, which then debuted at number one in the US box office and grossed over $140 million worldwide. He went on to play Sykes, a military weapons expert in the science fiction action thriller film Oblivion. That same year, he co-starred with Juliette Binoche in Erik Poppe's drama A Thousand Times Good Night. In 2014, he starred in Susanne Bier's Danish thriller A Second Chance as Andreas, a police officer forced to make a difficult choice. In 2016, Coster-Waldau appeared in the action-fantasy film Gods of Egypt as Horus.

In early 2017, he starred in E.L. Katz's dark comedy Small Crimes which premiered at South by Southwest film festival on 11 March 2017, to positive reviews. Coster-Waldau then appeared in the Danish film 3 Things, a thriller about a prime suspect of a bank robbery who negotiates the terms of his witness protection deal. He starred in Roman Waugh's prison film Shot Caller, which premiered at the Los Angeles Film Festival on 16 June 2017. Since January 2018 he has been the L'Oréal Paris global spokesperson for the company's Men Expert line of products. In 2017, Coster-Waldau also appared in a music video at the Danish comedy show Zulu Comedy Galla where he as part of Co3, a music group consisting of himself, Nikolaj Lie Kaas, Ulrich Thomsen og Josefine Frida Pettersen, performed the song "Polen smelter" (transl. Poland is melting).

In May 2017, it was announced that he starred in Brian De Palma's film Domino. The film was released on 31 May 2019. Later the same year he starred in Suicide Tourist by Jonas Alexander Arnby, which premiered at the Zurich Film Festival. That same year, Coster-Waldau launched a production company named Ill Kippers.

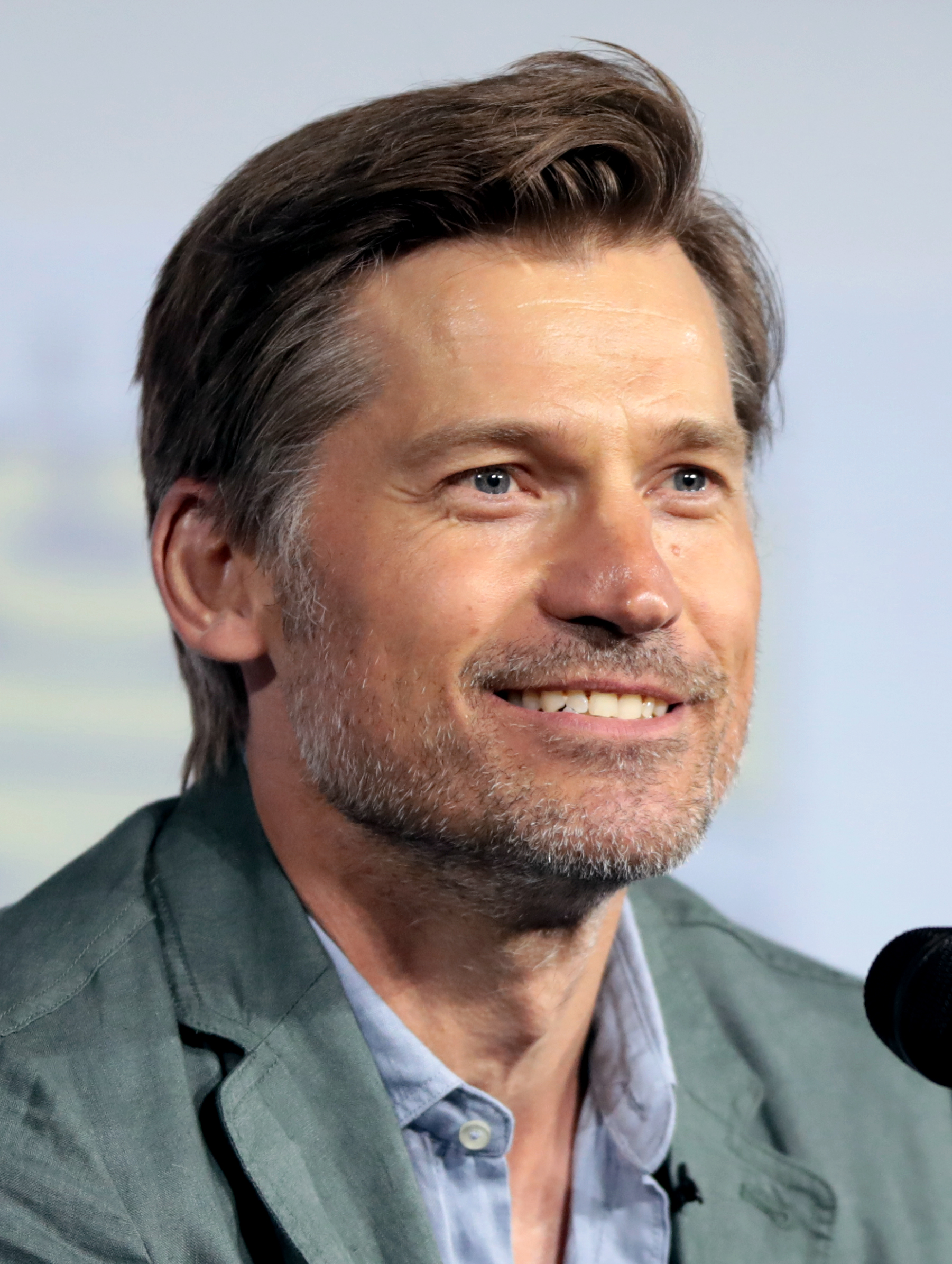
Coster-Waldau at the 2019 San Diego Comic-Con

He starred in the 2020 thriller The Silencing, directed by Robin Pront.

He filmed in secret the movie The Day We Died (Krudttønden) by Ole Christian Madsen. The film is based on events surrounding the 2015 Copenhagen shootings and was originally slated for release for late 2019. It was released in Europe on 3 May 2020. On 7 January 2021, Variety announced that Samuel Goldwyn Films had purchased U.S. distribution rights for the film.

Coster-Waldau was to have played Macbeth in 2020, in a production of Shakespeare's tragedy reuniting with Matt Shakman at the Geffen Playhouse. On 15 April 2020, the Geffen Playhouse announced on its blog that its production of Macbeth, among others, had been postponed because of the COVID-19 pandemic.

In November 2023, Coster-Waldau was announced to portray William the Conqueror in King & Conqueror. He also served as an executive producer on the series, and also directed one episode. King & Conqueror debuted on BBC One and BBC iPlayer on 24 August 2025, and has been sold worldwide.

== Other activities ==
Coster-Waldau has supported the Danish Red Cross since 2003.

In 2016, he announced a Game of Thrones campaign-contest in order to support the RED foundation which aims to raise awareness and fight AIDS.

"My main mission as UNDP Goodwill Ambassador will be to raise awareness and support for the Global Goals for a better future for all, which cannot be achieved without empowering women and protecting our planet,"

— Coster-Waldau on his mission as UNDP Goodwill Ambassador in 2016

Since September 2016, he has been serving as a UNDP Goodwill Ambassador to raise awareness and support the United Nations' Sustainable Development Goals, an action to end poverty, fight inequality and stop climate change. In 2017 Coster-Waldau partnered with Google, using Street View to document the impact of global warming in Greenland, in order to increase awareness and highlight climate change. After participating in a female empowerment initiative in Kenya, on the occasion of International Women's Day in 2017, he wrote a pledge calling for all fathers to support gender equality and women's empowerment, including those women who live in extreme poverty and are exposed to practises like child marriage. In September 2017, he was one of the speakers in The Spotlight Initiative, a European Union-United Nations action to eliminate violence against women and girls, after kicking off the women's amateur World Cup. In October 2017, he travelled to the Maldives to report global warming effects, resuming his role as a United Nations Development Program Goodwill Ambassador.

In early 2018, he and several other Danish artists signed a manifesto demanding zero tolerance for sexism, sexual harassment and sexual assault in the Danish film and stage arts industry. In June 2018, he kicked off The Lion's Share fund's launch, an action in which when an advertising campaign uses an image of an animal, the advertiser will donate 0.5% of the paid media spending of that campaign to the fund. In 2019, he travelled to Rwanda to report the progress of the country, and to Peruvian Amazonia on occasion of the Amazon rainforest wildfires to offer insights into the effects of climate change.

In 2024 he hosted the documentary series An Optimist's Guide to the Planet, profiling innovative new solutions to climate change.

Nikolaj has supported Ukraine since the beginning of Russia’s full-scale invasion. In April 2022, he joined the "Stand Up for Ukraine" initiative.

In February 2026, Coster-Waldau participated in an event in support of Ukraine organized by Ukraine House in Denmark.

As part of a UNDP humanitarian mission, the actor went to Ukraine in late October 2026 to see firsthand how communities are recovering from shelling and preparing for winter. In Kyiv, Nikolaj visited the damaged "Comfort Town" residential complex, attended a one-man show by veteran Volodymyr Tuka, spent the night in the underground during ballistic missile attacks, and visited the Chоrnobyl Nuclear Power Plant for a documentary project. He also attended a concert by singer Mery L and the band Radiostars in Mykolaiv and made a stop in Odesa. Concluding his visit, the actor posted a video featuring a map of air raid alerts in Ukraine, urging the international community not to forget about the war and to continue providing financial support to Ukrainian people.

== Personal life ==
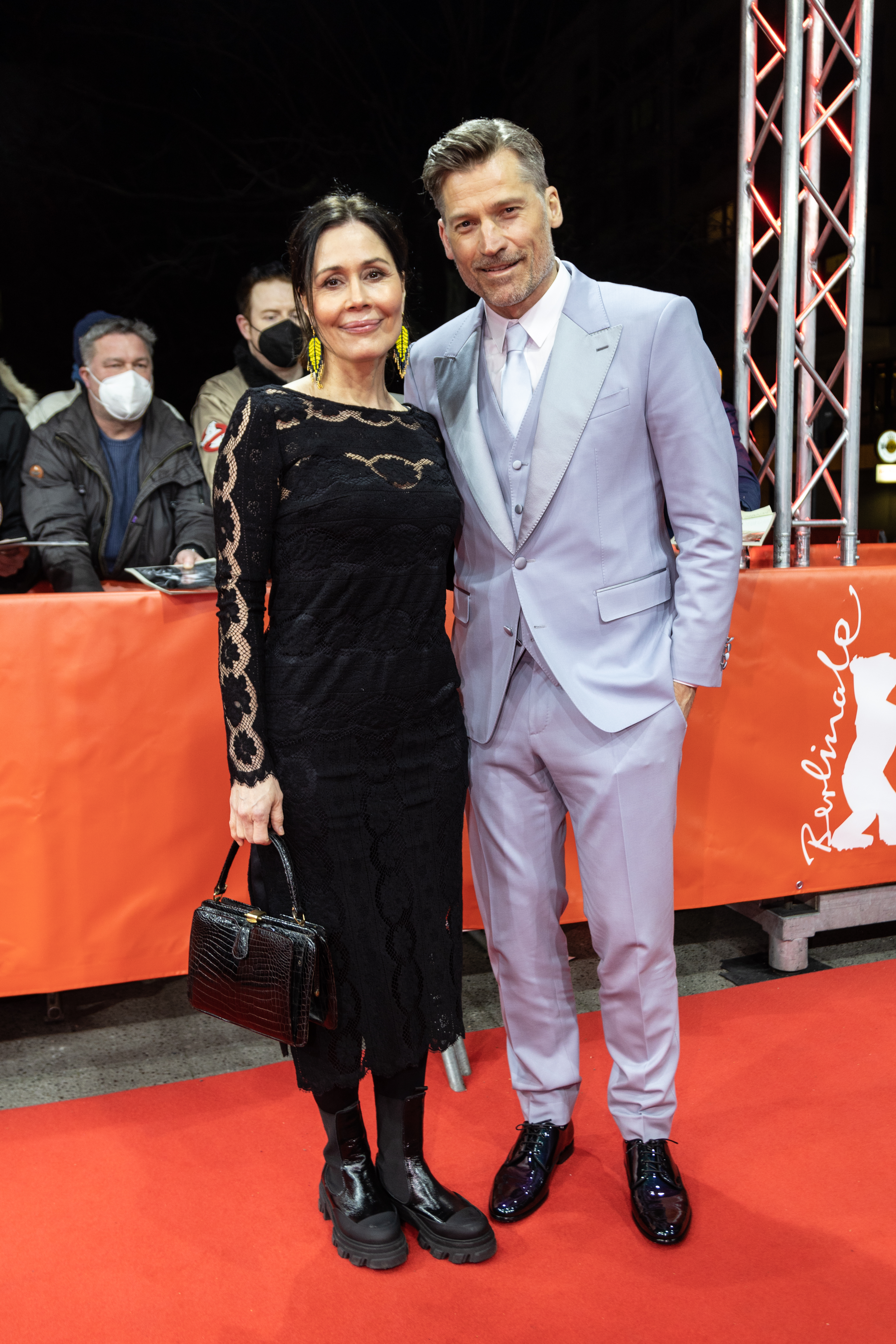
Coster-Waldau with his wife Nukâka in 2022.

Although Coster-Waldau is not religious, he was baptized and confirmed as a Lutheran in the Danish National Church during his youth; like the vast majority of Danes, he viewed his confirmation as a big moment in his life when he first identified as becoming an adult.

He married Nukâka, a Greenlandic actress and singer, in 1997 and they live in Copenhagen with their two daughters Filippa and Safina, as well as two dogs. Their daughter Filippa starred in a Danish short film, The Girl and the Dogs, which was shown at the Cannes Film Festival in 2014, and as the lead character in 2025 internationally produced TV drama series Smilla's Sense of Snow. Their other daughter, Safina, starred as the main character Simone in the Danish Christmas TV series Theo og Den Magiske Talisman in December 2018. His father-in-law is Josef Motzfeldt, a member of the Parliament of Greenland and former leader of the Community of the People Party (Inuit Ataqatigiit).

Although his father was a supporter of Arsenal, a trip to a match at the Elland Road ground in the early 1990s persuaded him to become a supporter of Leeds United, and he is a member of the Leeds United Supporters' Trust. He published a very emotional video to thank Marcelo Bielsa, Leeds head coach in 2020, when the team was finally promoted to the Premier League again after 16 years.

== Acting credits ==
=== Film ===
Year	Title	Role	Notes	Ref.
1994	Nightwatch	Martin Bork		
1997	Bent	Wolf		
1997	Hemmeligheder	Mads		
1998	Wildside	Ossy	Also writer	
1998	Nattens engel	Frankie		
1999	The Cable Club	Rocker		
1999	Misery Harbour	Espen Arnakke		
2000	På fremmed mark	Holt		
2001	Enigma	Puck		
2001	Black Hawk Down	MSG Gary Gordon		
2002	24 Hours in the Life of a Woman	Anton		
2003	Stealing Rembrandt	Kenneth		
2003	The Bouncer	Svend		
2004	My Name Is Modesty	Miklos		
2004	The Good Cop	Sune		
2004	Wimbledon	Dieter Prohl		
2005	Kingdom of Heaven	Village Sheriff		
2005	The Headsman	Martin		
2006	Firewall	Liam		
2006	Triple Dare	Martin		
2007	The Baker	Bjorn		
2007	Wonderful and Loved by All	Micke		
2007	The Early Years: Erik Nietzsche Part 1	Sammy		
2008	The Kautokeino Rebellion	Biskop Juell		
2008	Himmerland	Thomas	Also co-producer	
2009	At World's End	Severin Geertsen		
2011	Blackthorn	James Jovin		
2011	Headhunters	Clas Greve		
2012	Aurum	—N/a	Executive producer only	
2013	Mama	Lucas "Luke" Desange / Jeffrey Desange		
2013	Oblivion	Sykes		
2013	A Thousand Times Good Night	Marcus		
2014	The Other Woman	Mark King		
2014	A Second Chance	Andreas		
2014	Upstart	—N/a	Executive producer only	
2014	Livsforkortelses Ekspert	—N/a	Producer only	
2015	Klown Forever	Himself	Cameo	
2016	Gods of Egypt	Horus		
2016	Chicken / Egg	Kenneth	Short film	
2017	Small Crimes	Joe Denton		
2017	3 Things	Mikael	Also executive producer	
2017	Shot Caller	Jacob "Money" Harlon		
2019	Domino	Christian		
2019	Suicide Tourist	Max Isaksen		
2020	Krudttønden	Rico		
2020	The Silencing	Rayburn Swanson		
2021	A Taste of Hunger	Carsten		
2022	Against the Ice	Ejnar Mikkelsen	Also co-writer and producer	
2023	The Flash	Pizza Man	Uncredited Cameo	
2023	God Is a Bullet	Bob Hightower		
2023	Nattevagten - Dæmoner går i arv	Martin Bork		
2024	My Fathers' Daughter	Himself		
TBA	The Last Mrs. Parrish	Jackson Parrish	Filming	

=== Television ===
Year	Title	Role	Notes	Ref.
1993	Slaget på tasken	Christian	Television film	
1995	Who's Hitler?	Nattevagten	Television short	
1995	Lyse tider		Television short	
1997	Jacobs liste	Jacob	Television film	
2000	Lock, Stock...	Jordi	2 episodes	
2006	Filthy Gorgeous	Alex	Television film	
2008	New Amsterdam	John Amsterdam	8 episodes	
2009	Virtuality	Commander Frank Pike	Television film	
2009–10	The Left Wing Gang	Jan Weimann	5 episodes	
2011–19	Game of Thrones	Jaime Lannister	Main role	
2015	Saturday Night Live	Jaime Lannister	Episode: "Taraji P. Henson/Mumford & Sons"	
2017	The Simpsons	Markery (voice)	Episode: "The Serfsons"	
2023–	The Last Thing He Told Me	Owen	7 episodes	
2024	An Optimist's Guide to the Planet	Himself	6 episodes	
2025	King & Conqueror	William the Conqueror	Main role	

=== Theatre ===
Year	Title	Role	Venue	Ref.
1992–1993	Hamlet	Laertes	Betty Nansen Theater	
1994	Morgen og aften	Colin Henderson	Husets Theater	
1995	Privatliv	Elyot	Mungo Park	
1995	Uidentificerede menneskerester og kærlighedens sande væsen		Royal Danish Theatre	
1996	I en Fremmeds Øjne	Daniel	Café Teatret	
1997	Paradis	Lars Emberg	N. Cederholm/Dante	
1997	Lovestory	Martin	Mungo Park	
2000	Drengene i Skyggen	Christoffer	Betty Nansen Theater	
2002	Becket	Becket	Gladsaxe Ny Teater	
2009	Øjeblikket		Betty Nansen Theater	
2020	Macbeth	Macbeth	Geffen Playhouse	

== Awards and nominations ==
Year	Award	Category	Work	Result	Ref.
1994	Bodil Awards	Best Actor	Nightwatch	Nominated	
1999	Robert Awards	Best Actor	Wildside	Nominated	
2003	Robert Awards	Best Actor	The Bouncer	Nominated	
2011	Scream Award	Best Ensemble	Game of Thrones	Nominated	
2011	Screen Actors Guild Award	Best Ensemble in a Drama Series	Game of Thrones	Nominated	
2013	People's Choice Awards	Favorite TV Anti-Hero	Game of Thrones	Nominated	
2013	Critics' Choice Television Award	Best Supporting Actor in a Drama Series	Game of Thrones	Nominated	
2013	Satellite Awards	Best Supporting Actor – Series, Miniseries or Television Film	Game of Thrones	Nominated	
2013	Saturn Award	Best Supporting Actor on Television	Game of Thrones	Nominated	
2013	Screen Actors Guild Award	Best Ensemble in a Drama Series	Game of Thrones	Nominated	
2014	Screen Actors Guild Award	Best Ensemble in a Drama Series	Game of Thrones	Nominated	
2015	Screen Actors Guild Award	Best Ensemble in a Drama Series	Game of Thrones	Nominated	
2015	Empire Awards	Empire Hero Award (shared with cast)	Game of Thrones	Won	
2016	Screen Actors Guild Award	Best Ensemble in a Drama Series	Game of Thrones	Nominated	
2017	Zulu Award	Best Actor	Game of Thrones	Nominated	
2017	Nordisk Film Fond	Ove Sprogøe Award		Won	
2017	Screen Actors Guild Award	Best Ensemble in a Drama Series	Game of Thrones	Nominated	
2018	Saturn Awards	Best Supporting Actor on a Television Series	Game of Thrones	Nominated	
2018	Primetime Emmy Awards	Outstanding Supporting Actor in a Drama Series	Game of Thrones	Nominated	
2019	Saturn Awards	Best Supporting Actor on Television	Game of Thrones	Nominated	
2019	Primetime Emmy Awards	Outstanding Supporting Actor in a Drama Series	Game of Thrones	Nominated	
2019	Screen Actors Guild Award	Best Ensemble in a Drama Series	Game of Thrones	Nominated	
2022	Bodil Awards	Best Actor	A Taste of Hunger	Nominated	
2022	Robert Awards	Best Actor	A Taste of Hunger	Nominated	
