= Clash of Egos =

- Directed by: Tomas Villum Jensen
- Written by: Anders Thomas Jensen
- Starring: Ulrich Thomsen; Nikolaj Lie Kaas
- Distributed by: Nordisk Film
- Release date: 25 August 2006
- Running time: 90 minutes
- Country: Denmark
- Language: Danish

Clash of Egos (Danish: Sprængfarlig bombe) is a 2006 Danish comedy film directed by Tomas Villum Jensen, and written by Anders Thomas Jensen.

== Plot ==
Tonny is an aggressive husband and father who has been sent to jail for assaulting a man in public. Tonny's wife, Tanja, promptly divorced him, but Tonny manages to retain occasional custody of his two children.

On one of their afternoons together, Tonny and his children go to see the new Harry Potter movie, but discover that the film is sold out. The only other option available to them at the cinema is pretentious experimental Danish film called The Murderer, directed by Claus Volter. Neither Tonny and his children enjoy the film, and they are deeply upset by a scene featuring the ritualistic slaughter of a dog. Frustrated, Tonny smashes a display case in the cinema lobby, which leads him to lose his custodial session with his children.

Tonny decides to track Volter down for a refund of the cost for seeing the film. He finds Volter in a film set shooting the final film of the trilogy, The Artist. The shoots goes horrible, and Volter ends up pushing Tonny off a scaffolding. As part of a legal settlement, Tonny wants to be the co-writer and co-director of Volter's new film; Volter finds this disrupting to his artistic expression, but compromises as a favour to his producer, Per Schack.

With help from his brother and his co-worker Clara, Tonny rewrites the entire script, turning it into an action movie with the intention of making something enjoyable for him and his children. Volter tries to bring some artistic merit to the film, but Schack and Pernille, lead actress and Volter's wife, prefer Tonny's more commercial vision. When Volter finds Tonny having sex with Pernille at the wrap party, Volter removes his name from the film and deliberately botches the editing of the film as an act of sabotage.

The film appears to be jaunty and disconnected, but the critics love it and rate it highly. Disillusioned, Volter decides to grant Tonny the refund he originally wanted. Tonny makes up with Clara and invites her on a date with him and his children.

== Cast ==
- Ulrich Thomsen - Tonny
- Nikolaj Lie Kaas - Claus Volter
- Line Kruse - Clara
- Mille Dinesen - Pernille
- Lars Brygmann - Tim Holstein
- Kristian Halken - Per Schack
- Nicolaj Kopernikus - Jan Godtfredsen
- Jakob Cedergren - Allan Henriksen
- Niels Olsen - Brormand
- Ellen Hillingsø - Tanja

== Production ==
Sprængfarlig bombe is a comedy film, directed by Tomas Villum Jensen, and written by Anders Thomas Jensen.
