= Kristian Halken =

Danish actor (born 1955)

- Born: 3 April 1955 (age 71); Horsens, Denmark
- Occupation: Actor
- Years active: 1981–present

Kristian Halken (born 3 April 1955) is a Danish actor. He has appeared in more than sixty films since 1981.

== Selected filmography ==
Film
Year	Title	Role	Notes
2014	Speed Walking		
2013	Sorrow and Joy		
2013	The Shooter		
2009	Oldboys		
2006	Clash of Egos		
2005	Dark Horse		
2005	The Sun King		
1997	Eye of the Eagle		

TV
Year	Title	Role	Notes
2013	Borgen	Erik Hoffmann	8 episodes
2013–2023	Seaside Hotel	Peter Andreas Kjær	
