= Maibritt Saerens =

Danish actress (born 1970)

Maibritt Saerens (born 25 May 1970 in Silkeborg) is a Danish actress. Her breakthrough was in the role as Søs in the TV series Better Times.

Saerens played in the 2015 TV series The Heavy Water War, appeared as Stella Shearwood in 2014 “Death of a Family Man” S4:E4 of Vera, and had a starring role in the 2010 Norwegian movie Happy, Happy.
