= In Your Hands (2004 film) =

- English-language promotional poster
- Danish: Forbrydelser
- Directed by: Annette K. Olesen
- Starring: Ann Eleonora Jørgensen; Trine Dyrholm; Nicolaj Kopernikus
- Cinematography: Boje Lomholdt
- Music by: Jeppe Kaas
- Release date: 23 January 2004
- Running time: 101 minutes
- Country: Denmark
- Language: Danish

In Your Hands (Danish: Forbrydelser, lit. 'The Crimes') is a 2004 Danish film directed by Annette K. Olesen.

== Plot ==
Anna is a young Protestant minister who starts to work in a women's prison. There she meets a new inmate who is said to have supernatural healing capacities. The supernatural skills seem to be confirmed when the woman, Kate, tells Anna that she is pregnant. This turns out to be true, even though Anna had tried to become pregnant in vain before. But her private happiness is darkened by the announcement that there is a risk for a birth defect of the embryo. The decision whether or not to abort weighs on Anna and her relationship to her boyfriend. Desperate, Anna tries to even ask the mysterious inmate for help. But in the meantime, she has also learned that the background of Kate was severe child neglect due to drugs that led to the child dying from thirst. When Anna asks Kate to lay on hands to help the embryo she is pregnant with, she breaks down. Anna is drunk, and screams audibly for other inmates that Kate is a child murderer, which another member of staff had warned her would result in severe mistreatment of the inmate by other inmates. The member of staff who Kate has a secret romantic relationship with comes to find out who had screamed, and also tells Kate he will not see her anymore because another colleague had told him that she knew about their contact and relationships between staff and inmates are not allowed. When Kate enters the kitchen for breakfast, everybody knows she is responsible for the death of her daughter and not even women who she was previously friends with talk to her. Kate then commits suicide. The movie ends with Anna meeting her boyfriend at the hospital where the abortion is scheduled.

== Cast ==
- Ann Eleonora Jørgensen - Anna
- Trine Dyrholm - Kate
- Nicolaj Kopernikus - Henrik
- Sonja Richter - Marion
- Lars Ranthe - Frank
- Henrik Prip - Læge

== Production ==
In Your Hands was directed by Annette K. Olesen, with Boje Lomholdt doing the cinematography. Music was by Jeppe Kaas.

It is based on the principles of Dogme 95.

== Release ==
The film was released on 23 January 2004.

== Awards ==
- Special Jury Prize at the Valladolid International Film Festival
- Audience Award for Best Long Feature at the Bordeaux International Festival of Women in Cinema
- Best Leading Actor, Nikolaj Kopernikus, at the Bordeaux International Festival of Women in Cinema
