= The Sun King (film) =

- Directed by: Tomas Villum Jensen
- Written by: Anders Thomas Jensen
- Starring: Nikolaj Lie Kaas; Birthe Neumann
- Release date: 11 February 2005
- Running time: 1h 26min
- Country: Denmark
- Language: Danish

The Sun King (Danish: Solkongen) is a 2005 Danish comedy film directed by Tomas Villum Jensen.

== Cast ==
- Nikolaj Lie Kaas - Tommy
- Birthe Neumann - Susse
- Thomas Bo Larsen - Flemming Kok
- Niels Olsen - Ole Finland
- Peter Gantzler - Johannes
- Mira Wanting - Stine
- Lotte Andersen - Grethe
- Kirsten Lehfeldt - Tommys mor
- Jens Okking - Tommys far
- Ole Thestrup - Leif
- Kristian Halken - Læge
