= A Viking Saga =

- US DVD cover
- Directed by: Michael Mouyal
- Written by: Michael Mouyal; Dennis Goldberg
- Produced by: Ole Boetius; Alex Cohen
- Starring: Ken Vedsegaard; Peter Gantzler; Erik Holmey; Hans Henrik Clemensen
- Cinematography: Pierre Chemaly
- Edited by: Kinga Orlikowska
- Music by: Mark Allen
- Release date: 13 April 2008 (First Take Film Festival)
- Running time: 82 minutes
- Country: Denmark
- Languages: English; Danish

A Viking Saga is a 2008 film which is about the early life and rise to power of Oleg of Novgorod, the Rus prince who attacked and conquered Kiev in AD 882 from the Rus war-lords Askold and Dir, before moving his capital there. It was poorly rated.

== Cast ==
- Ken Vedsegaard as Oleg of Novgorod
- Peter Gantzler as Askold
- Erik Holmey as Rurik
- Kim Sønderholm as Dir
- Ida Marie Nielsen as young Lena

== See also ==
- List of historical drama films
