= Ken Vedsegaard =

Danish actor (born 1972)

- Born: 14 October 1972 (age 53); Copenhagen, Denmark
- Occupation: Actor
- Years active: 1988–present

Ken Vedsegaard (born 14 October 1972) is a Danish actor.

== Biography ==
Son of a restaurateur and raised in Copenhagen, Vedsegaard trained at the Skuespillerskolen at Aarhus Teater between 1996 and 2000. He is currently known for his role as Jesper Bang in the comedy/crime series Black Widows.

Vedsegaard has starred in a long list of television, theatre and film titles.

== Film ==
- Skyggen af Emma (1988) Albert
- Guldregn (1988) Lasse Brandt
- The Boys from St.Petri (1991) Student
- Høfeber (1991) Knallertkører
- En dag i oktober (1991) Resistance man
- Stolen Spring (1993) Young Aksel Nielsen
- Sidste time (1995) Rasmus
- Fede tider (1996) Henrik
- Slim Slam Slum (2002) Verner
- Den rette ånd (2005) Poul
- A Viking Saga (2007) Oleg
- ..Og det var Danmark (2008) Speaker

=== Television series ===
- Strisser på Samsø episodes 1 - 3(1997) Fisker/Mand på kroen
- Taxa episode 36 (1999) Friend
- Rejseholdet episode 24 (2002) Carsten
- Hotellet episodes 45 - 48 (2002) Rolf
- Krøniken episodes 1 - 15, 22 (2004–2007) Erik Nielsen
- Maj & Charlie (2008) Bo
- Forbrydelsen 2 episodes 1 - 10 (2009) Jens Peter Raben
