= Tomas Villum Jensen =

Danish actor (born 1971)

- Born: 12 April 1971 (age 54); Hundested, Denmark
- Occupation(s): Actor; Film director
- Years active: 1991–present

Tomas Villum Jensen (born 12 April 1971) is a Danish actor and film director. He has appeared in 33 films and television shows since 1991. He starred in The Boys from St. Petri, which was screened out of competition at the 1992 Cannes Film Festival.

== Filmography ==
=== Actor ===
==== Film ====
Year	Title	Role	Director	Notes
1991	The Boys from St. Petri	Lars Balstrup	Søren Kragh-Jacobsen	
1992	The Crumbs 2: Poor Crumb!	Per	Sven Methling	
1993	Stolen Spring	Ellerstrøm (young)	Peter Schrøder	
1993	Roses & Parsley	Piccolo	Eddie Thomas Petersen (2)	
1993	The Exam	Student	Eddie Thomas Petersen (2)	Short film
1993	Gigolo	Viktor	Carsten Rudolf	Short film
1994	The Crumbs 3: Dad's Bright Idea	Per	Sven Methling (2)	
1995	Final Hour	Taus	Martin Schmidt	
1995	Black Heart	Stine's Brother	Thomas Rostock	Short film
1995	Just a Girl	Kaj (older)	Peter Schrøder (2)	
1996	The Shadow of the Clouds Hits Me	Jens	Jonas Cornelll	Short film
1997	David's Book	Henrik	Lasse Spang Olsen	
1998	Angel of the Night	Mads	Shaky González	
1999	Misery Harbour	Jørgen	Nils Gaup	
1999	In China They Eat Dogs	Peter	Lasse Spang Olsen (2)	
2000	Juliane	Canon Photographer	Hans Kristensen	
2000	Flickering Lights	Tom	Anders Thomas Jensen	
2001	Count Axel	Peter	Søren Fauli	
2001	Jolly Roger	Archangel Emil	Lasse Spang Olsen (4)	
2002	Old Men in New Cars	Peter	Lasse Spang Olsen (4)	
2003	The Green Butchers	Craftsman	Anders Thomas Jensen (3)	
2005	Adam's Apples	Arne	Anders Thomas Jensen (3)	
2006	Clash of Egos	Himself	Himself (2)	
2013	Player	Reception Guest	Himself (2)	

=== Director ===
Year	Title	Notes
1996	Ernst & Lyset	Short film; Co-directed with Anders Thomas Jensen
1999	Love at First Hiccough	
2001	My Sister's Children	
2002	My Sister's Children in the Snow	
2005	The Sun King	
2006	Clash of Egos	
2009	At World's End	
2012	3 Litres of Clean Water in Uganda	Documentary film
2013	Player	
