= Krøniken =

- Also known as: Better Times
- Created by: Stig Thorsboe
- Written by: Stig Thorsboe; Hanna Lundblad
- Starring: Anders W. Berthelsen; Anne Louise Hassing; Maibritt Saerens; Ken Vedsegaard
- Country of origin: Denmark
- No. of episodes: 22

Production
- Running time: 1 hour

Original release
- Network: DR
- Release: 4 January 2004 – 1 January 2007

Krøniken (English: Better Times) is a Danish television drama which aired on Sunday evenings between January 2004 and January 2007. The 22-episode series relates the lives of two fictional families during the historical development of the Danmarks Radio television network from the 1950s to the 1970s.

Created by Stig Thorsboe for the DR broadcast-television network, the series debuted on 4 January 2004. The program's first season set popularity records. Five of the episodes were listed among the ten most watched television programs since records began in Denmark in 1992. The first-season finale topped the list with 2,717,000 viewers. In 2004, the program was nominated for the International Emmy Award for Best Drama but lost to Waking the Dead.

The series concluded with the 22nd episode airing on 1 January 2007 and watched by 2.4 million viewers.

== Plot ==
In 1949, the young Ida Nørregaard travels from Jutland to Copenhagen to enroll in a home-economics school and an evening-school programme. When she is told that she can not do both, she chooses the evening school.

Her parents are unhappy with her choice, but Ida is determined on making it on her own in the big city. She finds a job as a secretary at a radio factory. Erik Nielsen, the director's son, soon starts developing feelings towards Ida, which causes her to lose her job.

While Erik is trying to convince his father of the future of television, he also succeeds in attracting Ida's attention. Meanwhile, Søs Nielsen, Erik's lively sister, is engaged to a man she does not love. When he tries to rape her one night, she is helped by Palle From who is a working-class university student and lives next door to Ida. When Søs approaches him to thank him for his deed, an attraction starts to grow between them.

== Cast ==
- Anne Louise Hassing as Ida Nørregaard
- Ken Vedsegaard as Erik Nielsen (2004–2005)
- Anders W. Berthelsen as Palle From
- Maibritt Saerens as Søs From (Søs From Nielsen since 2005)
- Waage Sandø as Kaj Holger Nielsen
- Stina Ekblad as Karin Nielsen
- Dick Kaysø as Børge From
- Pernille Højmark as Karen Jensen
- Klaus Bondam as Lærer Arne Dupont
