= The Eagle (TV series) =

Danish police procedural television series

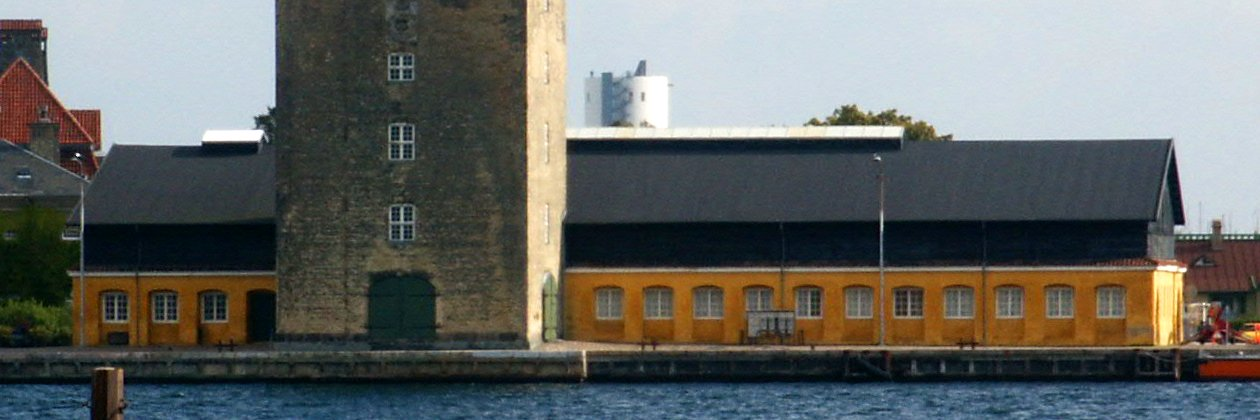
- The building Planbygningen with the lower part of the Masting Sheer (Mastekranen) at Holmen in Copenhagen, Denmark
- Also known as: The Eagle: A Crime Odyssey
- Genre: Crime drama, police procedural
- Created by: Peter Thorsboe and Mai Brostrøm.
- Directed by: Niels Arden Oplev, Søren Kragh-Jacobsen, Kristoffer Nyholm, Martin Schmidt
- Starring: Jens Albinus, Janus Nabil Bakrawi, Marina Bouras, Steen Stig Lommer, Ghita Nørby, Elva Osk Olafsdottir, Susan A. Olsen, David Owe
- Country of origin: Denmark
- Original languages: Danish; Swedish; German; English
- No. of seasons: 3
- No. of episodes: 24

Production
- Producer: Sven Clausen
- Running time: 1148 Minutes

Original release
- Network: DR
- Release: 10 October 2004 – 26 November 2006

The Eagle: A Crime Odyssey (Danish: Ørnen: En krimi-odyssé, lit. 'The Eagle: A Crime Odyssey') (2004-2006) is a Danish police procedural television series produced by Danmarks Radio, created and written by Peter Thorsboe and Mai Brostrøm. The series debuted on 10 October 2004 in Denmark. It won an International Emmy Award from the International Academy of Television Arts & Sciences for best non-American television drama series in 2005. There were three seasons; the second season premiered in Denmark on 9 October 2005 and the third on 8 October 2006. The last episode originally aired in Denmark on 26 November 2006. The series was filmed on location in various parts of northern Europe, from Berlin (Germany) and Copenhagen (Denmark) to Stockholm (Sweden), Oslo (Norway) and Iceland.

== Plot ==
The series is named after the lead character, a half-Icelandic half-Danish police officer named Hallgrim Ørn Hallgrimsson, nicknamed "Ørnen" (the eagle). In the first episode, a new international criminal investigative unit is being formed under Thea Nellemann (Ghita Nørby), and Hallgrimsson (Jens Albinus) is persuaded to take the job as the lead investigator for the unit. He puts together a small investigation team that are experts in their respective fields. Their cases cross the borders between Denmark, Norway, Sweden, Germany, Russia and various other countries; and involve biker gangs, former Russian KGB, possible terrorist threats and international fraud. Throughout the series Hallgrimsson deals with recurring flashbacks and possibly post-traumatic stress from a childhood incident.

== Cast ==
=== Main characters ===
- Jens Albinus as Hallgrim Ørn Hallgrimsson (2004–2006)
- Marina Bouras as Marie Wied (2004–2006)
- Steen Stig Lommer as Villy Frandsen (2004–2006)
- Susan A. Olsen as Ditte Hansen (2004–2006)
- Janus Nabil Bakrawi as Nazim Talawi (2004–2006)
- David Owe as Michael Kristensen (2004–2006)
- Ghita Nørby as Thea Nellemann (2004–2006)
- Hans Alfredsson as Hallgrim's dad (2004-2006)

=== Recurring Characters ===
- Henrik Lykkegaard as Jens Hansen (2004–2006)
- Morten Lützhøft as Holsøe (2004–2006)
- Kristian Wanzl as Gustav (2005)

== Episodes ==
The episodes bear the names of the following entities from Greek mythology:
Sisyphus, Scylla, Iphigenia, Ares, Nemesis, Hades, Cronus, Erinyes, Agamemnon, Keres, Calypso, Thanatos, Minos and Ithaca.

=== Season 1 ===
Ep #	Title (English)	Title (Danish)	First Airdate
1	Sisyphus 1	Sysifos 1	10 October 2004
2	Sisyphus 2	Sysifos 2	17 October 2004
3	Scylla	Skylla	24 October 2004
4	Iphigenia	Ifigenia	31 October 2004
5	Ares 1	Ares 1	7 November 2004
6	Ares 2	Ares 2	14 November 2004
7	Nemesis	Nemesis	21 November 2004
8	Hades	Hades	28 November 2004

=== Season 2 ===
Ep #	Title (English)	Title (Danish)	First Airdate
9	Cronus 1 mistranslated as Chronos 1	Kronos 1	9 October 2005
10	Cronus 2 mistranslated as Chronos 2	Kronos 2	16 October 2005
11	Erinyes	Erinye	23 October 2005
12	Agamemnon 1	Agamemnon 1	30 October 2005
13	Agamemnon 2	Agamemnon 2	6 November 2005
14	Agamemnon 3	Agamemnon 3	13 November 2005
15	Keres 1 mistranslated as Ceres 1	Keres 1	20 November 2005
16	Keres 2 mistranslated as Ceres 2	Keres 2	27 November 2005

=== Season 3 ===
Ep #	Title (English)	Title (Danish)	First Airdate
17	Calypso 1	Kalypso 1	8 October 2006
18	Calypso 2	Kalypso 2	15 October 2006
19	Thanatos	Thanatos	22 October 2006
20	Thanatos	Thanatos	29 October 2006
21	Minos	Minos	5 November 2006
22	Minos	Minos	12 November 2006
23	Ithaca	Ithaka	19 November 2006
24	Ithaca	Ithaka	26 November 2006

== Title track ==
The title track is called "Forgiveness". It is composed by Jacob Groth with lyrics and vocals by his spouse Misen Groth.
