= Stolen Spring =

1940 novel by Hans Scherfig

The Stolen Spring (Danish: Det forsømte Foraar, "The Neglected Spring") is a Danish novel by Hans Scherfig, first published in 1940. It has been described as "part murder mystery, part social criticism" by The Review of Contemporary Fiction.

The Stolen Spring's main theme is the solidarity of a group of boys in a school with harsh discipline. This, alongside other factors, makes the book stand out as being very socialist in its message. It is highly critical of the Danish educational system in the 20th century, a system Scherfig himself was a product of, and it is considered to be broadly based on some of his own experiences as a student at Metropolitanskolen.

== Reception ==
The Stolen Spring is considered a very important part of the Danish literary heritage by various experts and writers.

It is not featured in the new Danish Culture Canon. Some have speculated that the socialist message of the book may have been the deciding reason for this. However, other socialist works have been placed on the canon, e.g. the films Ditte Menneskebarn and Pelle the Conqueror both based on books by Martin Andersen Nexø.

== Adaptions ==
The novel was made into a film in 1993.
