= Robert Hansen (actor) =

Danish actor and television host (born 1979)

Robert Hansen (born 5 October 1979 in Hvidovre) is a Danish actor and television host, best known for his roles in the films Kærlighed ved første hik (1999) and Oldboys (2009), and the TV show Langt fra Las Vegas.
