= Odense Teater =

Theater in Odense, Denmark

Coordinates: 55°23′54″N 10°23′07″E

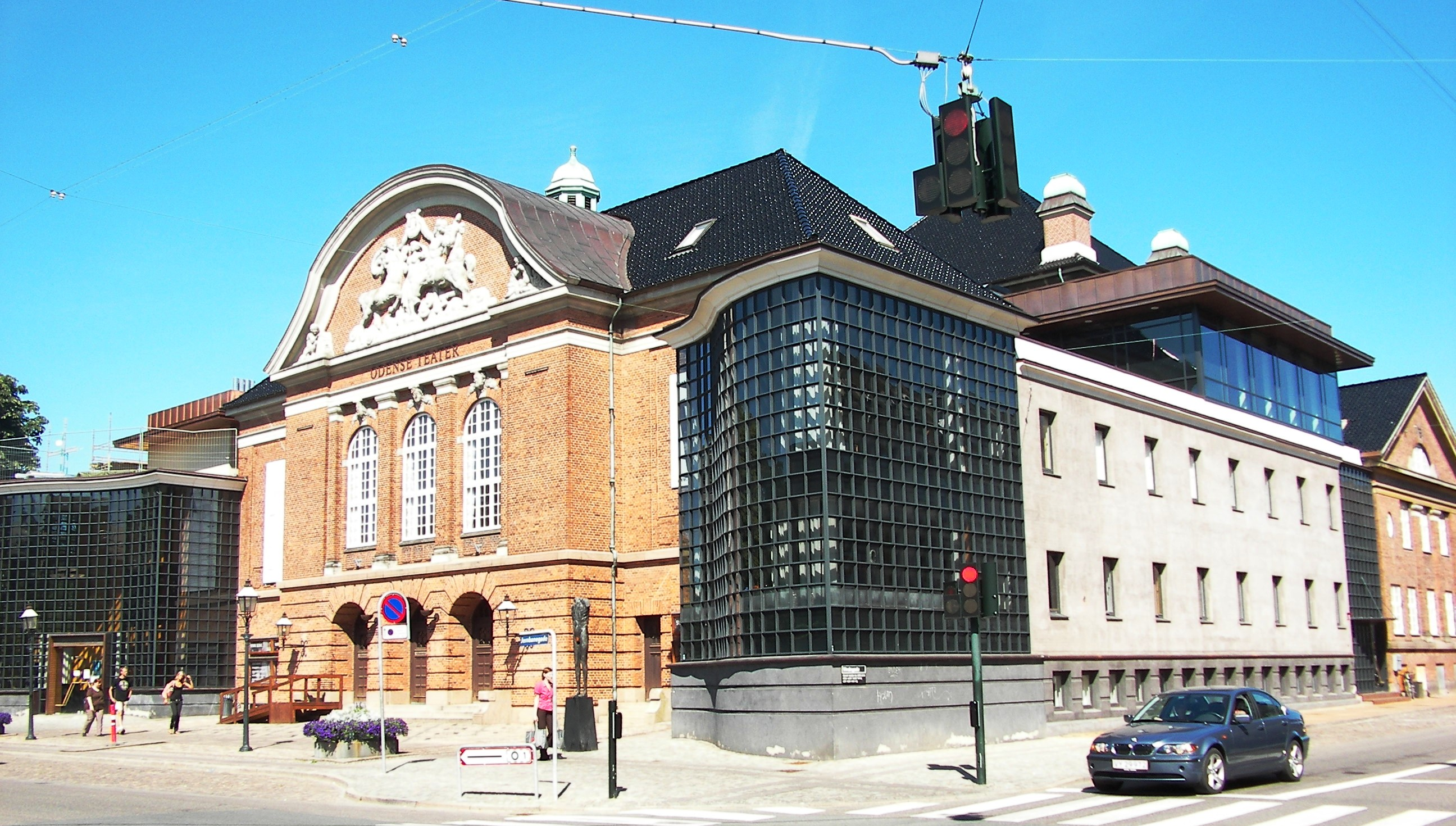
Odense Teater, Denmark

Odense Teater is a theatre in the city of Odense in Denmark. It dates back to 1796, making it Denmark's second-oldest theatre. It also includes a drama school.

== History ==
Odense Teater used to be at Sortebrødre Torv, where Hans Christian Andersen started as a writer.

It is notable in theatrical history for staging the première of Henrik Ibsen's first contemporary realist drama The Pillars of Society on 14 November 1877.

Since 1914, the theatre has been in Jernbanegade along with the King's Gardens and the Funen's Art Museum.

== Description ==
Odense Teater is one of the country's three main theatres.

It is located in Jernbanegade, where it has three stages: Store Scene, Værkstedet, and Foyerscenen. It also has stages at Farinen as well as Raffinaderiet in the old sugar factory, where there is also a drama school.

== Theatre school ==
The theatre includes a drama school (skuespillerskolen). In 2015 the school was amalgamated with five other drama schools, to form the Danish National School of Performing Arts.
