= Yamina Benguigui =

French film director and politician

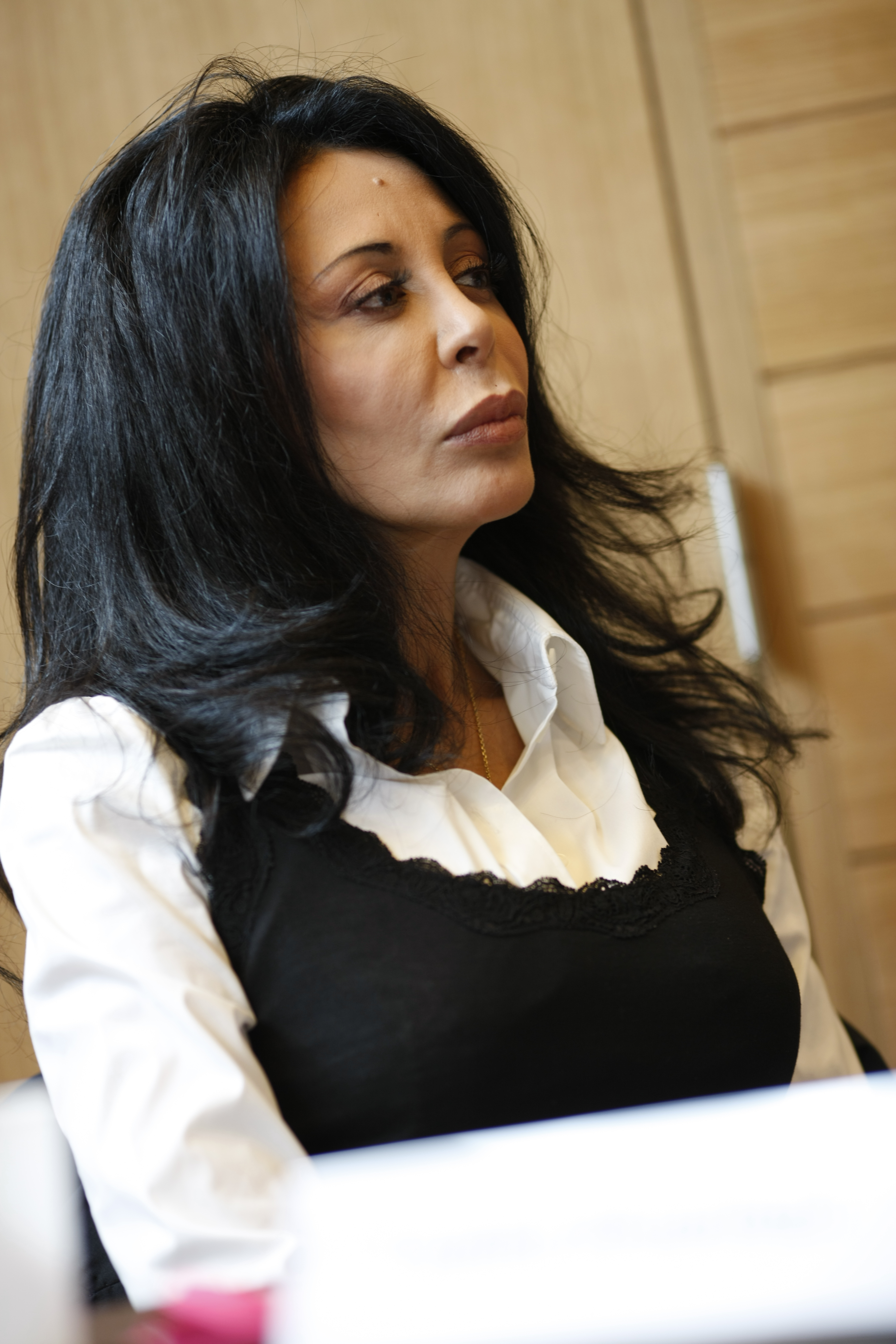
- Yamina Benguigui in 2009
- Born: Yamina Zora Belaïdi; 9 April 1955 (age 71); Lille, France
- Occupations: film director and politician

Yamina Benguigui (born Yamina Zora Belaïdi; in Lille on 9 April 1955) is a French film director and politician of Algerian descent. She is known for her films on gender issues in the North African (both Berbers and Arabs) immigrant community in France. Through her films, Benguigui gave a voice to many from the Maghrebi population in France.

== Life ==
Benguigui's parents were Algerian and immigrated to France from Algeria in the early 1950s. She never discovered why her parents decided to leave Algeria, saying the subject was considered taboo. Born in Lille, Benguigui was the eldest daughter of six children and spent her childhood in northern France. Describing herself as a quiet child who grew up in the Islamic tradition, Benguigui was only 13 years old when she first decided to become a filmmaker.

Her father was a political leader in the Algerian National Movement, and was jailed in France for three years as a political prisoner (she has also stated that he was jailed on two separate occasions, and that her whole family was once under house arrest). Because he did not support her in her chosen profession, Benguigui broke off contact with him early on, only to reconnect with him in late 2001. After she left the family her mother divorced her father as well. Yamina Benguigui married a Jewish pied-noir and has two daughters.

In September 2009, she signed a petition in support of Roman Polanski, calling for his release after he was arrested in Switzerland in relation to his 1977 charge for drugging and raping a 13-year-old girl.

== Career in cinema ==
Earning her baccalaureate and going on to study at film school, Benguigui then collaborated with French director Jean-Daniel Pollet. Later Benguigui founded "Bandit Productions" with director Rachid Bouchareb. While her work consisted of a feature film and short films, Benguigui's widely known for her documentaries which were mainly released in the 90's. She uses her films as a tool to build bridges between France's majority and minoritized groups, by bringing to light social issues such as challenges immigrants face. However, Benguigui did not represent all voices and through the film edits and framing of interviews, she ignored certain voices that did not benefit the message her films were sending.

Benguigui released In 1994 her documentary Femmes d'Islam was broadcast on France 2, but subsequently she decided that she would prefer to examine the immigrant experience in France rather than life in Algeria.

Her next documentary, Mémoires d'immigrés, l'héritage maghrébin, cost 50 million francs and was the result of 350 interviews conducted with immigrants across France. After a two-year period of preparation and another nine months of editing it was first shown in May 1997 on Canal+. Receiving positive reviews from critics, it was rebroadcast the following month and brought to theaters the following January.

In 2001, Benguigui produced Inch’Allah dimanche, which takes a closer look at the role gender takes within the space of a home, specifically a young women, Zouina and her family. Previous films, made by men, depict Algerian women as secondary characters, and Benguigui uses her film as a platform where these women can be depicted as multifaceted and Zouina is able to negotiate her identity outside of the strict rules set by her husband.

In February 2008 Benguigui began work on a film entitled Le paradis, c'est complet!, starring Isabelle Adjani.

In 2021 she released a project with Adjani called Soeurs which traced the lives of three sisters of Algerian origin living in France whose lives are disrupted by a series of events including their father's illness and death in Algeria.

== Career in politics ==
In the French municipal elections of March 2008 Benguigui was elected to represent the 20th arrondissement of Paris on the Paris city council, where she concerned herself in particular with human rights and the fight against discrimination. She is associated with the Socialist Party.

On 16 May 2012 President François Hollande of France appointed her to the post of Junior Minister for French Nationals Abroad and Relations with La Francophonie (French-speaking countries worldwide) at the Ministry of Foreign Affairs.

On 21 June 2012 Yamina Benguigui was confirmed as Minister for la Francophonie in the French Government. On 30 June 2012 the French President Francois Hollande asked Yamina Benguigui to succeed to Former French Prime Minister Jean Pierre Raffarin as his authorized representative for the OIF

== Filmography ==
- 1994: Femmes d'Islam
- 1997: Mémoires d'immigrés, l'héritage maghrébin (Immigrant Memories) – Director
- 2001: Pimprenelle, in Pas d'histoires! (Don't Make Trouble!) – Director and writer
- 2001: Inch'Allah Dimanche (Inch'Allah Sunday) – Director and writer
- 2003: Aïcha, Mohamed, Chaïb… Engagés pour la France)
- 2004: Le Plafond de verre (The Glass Ceiling) – Director and writer
- 2006: Les Défricheurs – Director
- 2007: Changer de regard - Portrait n° 5 – Director
- 2008: 9/3, mémoire d'un territoire – Director
- 2009-2012: Aïcha – Director
- 2019: Le Dernier poumon du monde – Director
- 2021: Soeurs

== Awards ==
=== Mémoires d'immigrés, l'héritage maghrébin ===
- Festival International de Programmes Audiovisuels, Michel Mitrani prize
- San Francisco International Film Festival, Golden Gate Award
- 7 d'Or, Best Documentary (1997)

=== Inch'Allah Dimanche ===
- Amiens International Film Festival, OCIC Award and Prize of the City of Amiens (2001)
- Bordeaux International Festival of Women in Cinema, Audience Award and Golden Wave (2001)
- Cairo International Film Festival, Golden Pyramid (2001)
- International Film Festival of Marrakech, Golden Star (2001)
- Toronto International Film Festival, International Critics' Award (FIPRESCI) (2001)

== Honours ==
- 2002: Officier of the Ordre des Arts et des Lettres
- 2003: Chevallier of the Ordre national de la Légion d'honneur
- 2003: Il Sigillo della Pace Price in Florence, for Lifetime Achievement.
- 2007: Officier of the National Order of Merit
