= At World's End (2009 film) =

- Film poster
- Danish: Ved verdens ende
- Directed by: Tomas Villum Jensen
- Written by: Anders Thomas Jensen
- Starring: Nikolaj Lie Kaas; Birgitte Hjort Sørensen; Nikolaj Coster-Waldau
- Cinematography: Jan Richter-Friis
- Release date: 9 October 2009
- Running time: 95 min
- Country: Denmark
- Language: Danish

At World's End (Danish: Ved verdens ende) is a 2009 Danish action comedy film directed by Tomas Villum Jensen and starring Nikolaj Lie Kaas, Birgitte Hjort Sørensen and Nikolaj Coster-Waldau.

== Plot ==
During the filming of a nature programme in the Indonesian rain forest, a British TV crew discover a rare white flower, but are attacked and killed by a Danish hermit, Severin Geertsen (Nikolaj Coster-Waldau). Severin, who is sentenced to death for the crime, claims he is 129 years old and that it is the leaves of the flower that have kept him young. Criminal psychiatrist Adrian (Nikolaj Lie Kaas) and his assistant, Beate (Birgitte Hjort Sørensen) are sent to Indonesia by the Danish authorities to mentally examine Severin. Although the claim that the flower gives eternal life sounds like a hoax, within hours Adrian, Severin and Beate are fleeing from international fortune hunters and the Indonesian army, who all want to acquire the flower.

== Cast ==
- Nikolaj Lie Kaas as Adrian Gabrielsen
- Birgitte Hjort Sørensen as Beate
- Nikolaj Coster-Waldau as Severin Geertsen
- Nicolas Bro as Mikael Feldt
- Søren Pilmark as Consul
- Ulf Pilgaard as Werner Gabrielsen
- Birthe Neumann as Bitten Gabrielsen
- Steven Berkoff as Jack Pudovski
