= Ann Eleonora Jørgensen =

Danish actress (born 1965)

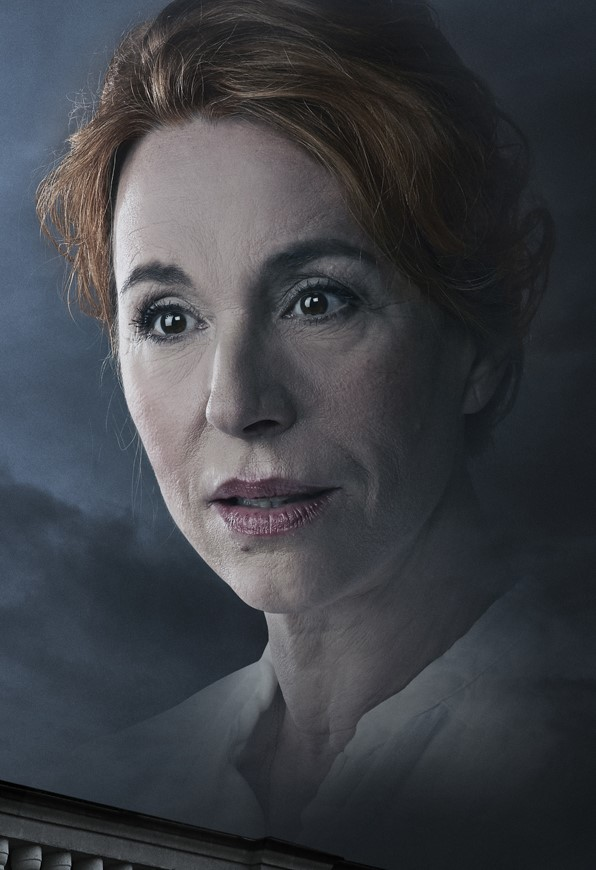
- Jørgensen in 2015
- Born: 16 October 1965 (age 60); Hjørring, Denmark
- Occupation: Actress
- Years active: 1989–present
- Awards: 1 Robert Award

Ann Eleonora Jørgensen (born 16 October 1965) is a Danish film, television, and stage actress. She is best known for her work in the TV series Taxa (1997–1999) and The Killing (2007), and for her film roles in Italian for Beginners (2000), for which she won a Robert Award as Best Supporting Actress, and In Your Hands (2004).

== Early life and education ==
Ann Eleonora Jørgensen was born on 16 October 1965 in Hjørring, Denmark.

== Career ==
Jørgensen starred in the Danish television series Taxa (1997–1999) and The Killing (2007), and she appeared in the films Italian for Beginners in 2000 and In Your Hands (2004).

She has also acted in numerous theatrical performances in some of Denmark's leading theatres, including Mungo Park, Avenue T, and Grønnegårds Teatret. When she is not filming, Jørgensen is an active member of the touring company Det Danske Teater.

In 2021, she had a role in the Netflix Christmas horror series Elves.

== Accolades ==
- 2001: Robert Award as Best Supporting Actress, for her role in Italian for Beginners

== Selected filmography ==
=== Film ===
List of film appearances, with year, title, and role shown
Year	Title	Role	Notes
2000	Italian for Beginners	Karen	
2001	One-Hand Clapping	Helene	
2004	In Your Hands	priestess Anna	
2004	Agata and the Storm	Pernille Margarethe Kierkegaard	
2008	Fatso	Danish prostitute	
2025	Kærlighedens gerninger	Kirsten	

=== Television ===
List of television appearances, with year, title, and role shown
Year	Title	Role	Notes
1997–1999	Taxa	Nina Boye-Larsen	26 episodes
2001	Hotellet	Lene Dupont	1 episode
2005	Jul i Valhal	Tove	24 episodes
2007	The Killing	Pernille Birk Larsen	20 episodes
2011–2012	Lykke	Charlotte Hornbek	18 episodes
2014, 2018	Midsomer Murders	Birgitte Poulsen	2 episodes
2017–2018	Herrens Veje	Elisabeth	20 episodes
2021	Elves	Karen	6 episodes
2021	Fantomforhold	Ellen	7 episodes
