= Hans Scherfig =

Danish author and artist

- Born: Hans Christian Scherfig; 8 April 1905; Copenhagen, Denmark
- Died: 28 January 1979; Hillerød, Denmark
- Resting place: Assistens Cemetery, Copenhagen, Denmark
- Occupation: Author; Painter
- Education: University of Copenhagen
- Spouse: Elisabeth Karlinsky (m. 1931)

Hans Scherfig (April 8, 1905 – January 28, 1979) was a renowned Danish writer and artist.

== Life and career ==
His most famous works of literature include Stolen Spring, Frydenholm, Idealists, and The Scorpion, the last of which was published in over 20 countries. He is also well known for his distinctive Naivist lithographs which depict jungle and savanna scenes that owe something to Henri Rousseau, and various drawings and paintings with satirical, political, and biblical subject matter.

Central to Scherfig's work was his lifelong political engagement. Already in his early years he became a dedicated communist and remained so until his death in 1979. He was also a long-standing member of the Communist Party of Denmark. Because of this Scherfig was imprisoned by the Nazi German military occupation forces in Denmark during WWII. During the Cold War, Scherfig intensified his critical attitude against the United States.

Scherfig lies in an unmarked grave in Assistens Cemetery (Copenhagen). His grave can be identified by the stone sculpture of a turtle which lies beside it.

== Work ==
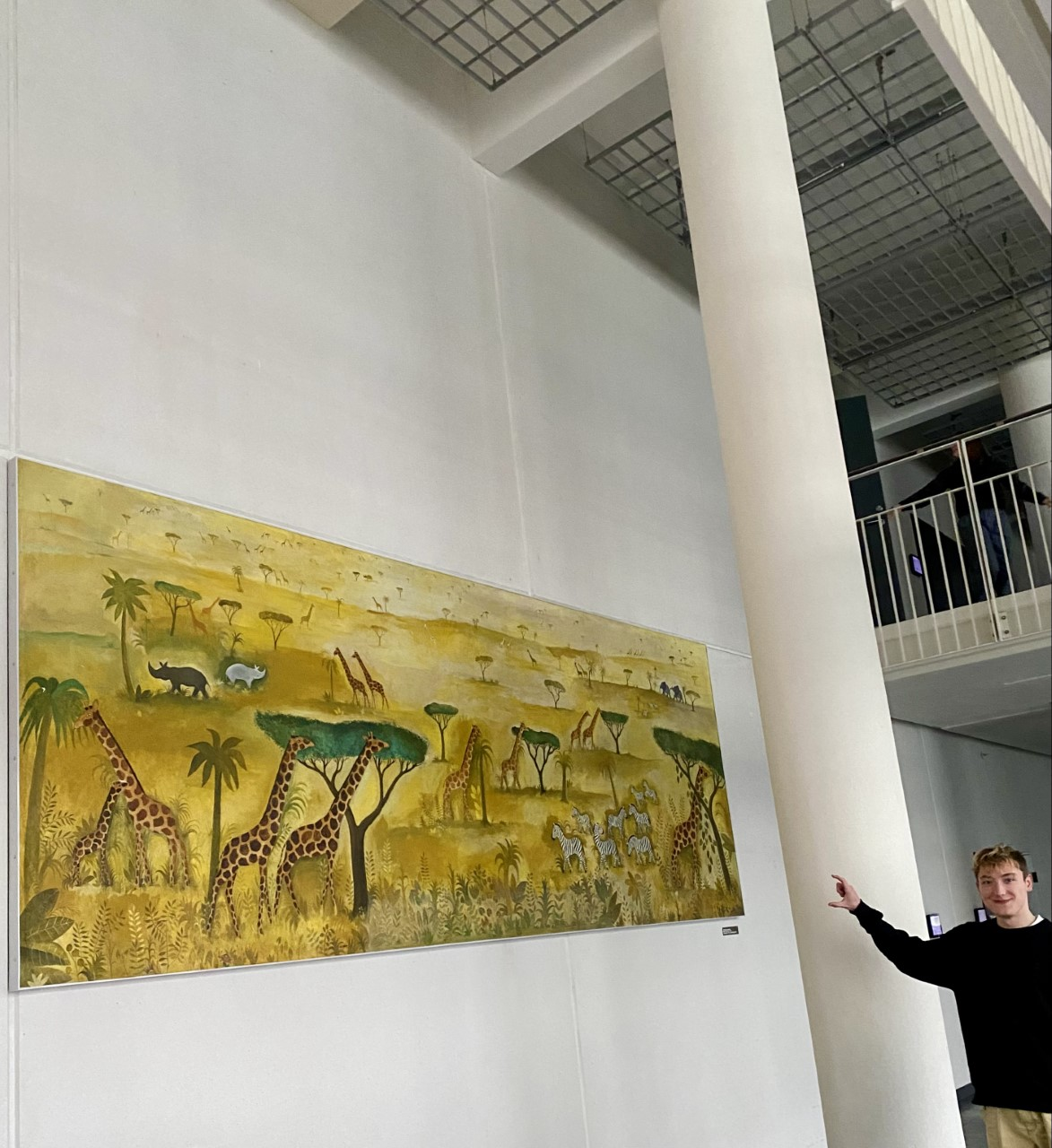
Scherfig's 'Savanne' in building 21 on South Campus (University of Copenhagen)

=== Novels ===
- Den Døde Mand, 1937
- Den forsvundne fuldmægtig, 1938
- Det Forsømte Forår (Stolen Spring), 1940
- Idealister (Idealists), 1945
- Skorpionen (The Scorpion), 1953
- Frydenholm, 1962
- Den Fortabte abe, 1964

== Prizes ==
Scherfig won a number of prizes within the field of Danish literature, including the following:

- 1973 Grand Prize of the Danish Academy
- 1965 Jeanne and Henri Nathan's Memorial Grant
- 1963 Adam Oehlenschläger legatet
- 1954 Holger Drachmann Scholarship
- 1952 Jeanne and Henri Nathan's Memorial Grant
