= Annette K. Olesen =

Danish screenwriter and director

Annette K. Olesen is a Danish screenwriter and director. Her films Minor Mishaps (2002), In Your Hands (2004), and Little Soldier (2008) premiered at the Berlin International Film Festival and were nominated for the Golden Bear.

== Career ==
Olesen made her feature film debut at the 52nd Berlin International Film Festival with Minor Mishaps, where it won the Blue Angel Award.
