= Danish National School of Performing Arts =

Group of performing arts colleges in Denmark

Coordinates: 55°40′55″N 12°36′24″E

The Danish National School of Performing Arts (Danish: Den Danske Scenekunstskole), also known as DASPA, is an artistic educational institution governed by the Danish Ministry of Culture since 2015, made up of amalgamated performing arts schools across the country. The DASPA offers higher education and continuing education performing arts courses. The school has campuses in Aarhus, Fredericia, Holstebro, Copenhagen, and Odense.

== History ==
The DASPA was established in 2015 when all the Danish performing arts colleges were unified in one school. Former performance institutions included Aarhus Theatre School (Acting), Aarhus Theatre Playwright School, Odense Teater school, the Danish Musical Academy in Fredericia, Odsherred Teater School in Nykøbing Sjælland, and the National Performing Arts School (Statens Scenekunstskole).

== Programmes ==
The school offers educational programmes at BA, MFA, and diploma level. Bachelor level programmes include:

- Acting
- Dance and Choreography
- Musical Theatre
- Theatre and Performance Making (Lighting, Playwriting, Scenography, Sound, Stage Directing)
- Performing Arts Production (Management, Stagecraft)

Master level programmes include:

- Master of Fine Arts in Performing Arts
- Master of Fine Arts in Choreography
- Master of Fine Arts in Playwriting.
- Masters of Fine Arts in Directing.
- Masters of Fine Arts in Acting.
- Master of Fine Arts in Dance and Participation

The school also offers a Diploma in Creative Producing and Cultural Leadership.

== Notable alumni ==
- Pilou Asbæk
- Marie Bach Hansen
- Claes Bang
- Kim Bodnia
- Lars Bom
- Nicolas Bro
- Angela Bundalovic
- Nikolaj Coster-Waldau
- Jessica Dinnage
- Mille Dinesen
- Trine Dyrholm
- Mikkel Boe Følsgaard
- Peter Gantzler
- Anne Louise Hassing
- Birgitte Hjort Sørensen
- Lars Mikkelsen
- Birthe Neumann
- Naja Salto
- Patricia Schumann
- Charlotte Sieling
- Esben Smed
- Morten Suurballe
- Ulrich Thomsen
- May el-Toukhy
