= 43rd Robert Awards =

2026 Danish film awards ceremony

- Date: 31 January 2026
- Hosted by: Marijana Jankovic
- Organized by: Danish Film Academy

Highlights
- Most awards: Film; The Girl with the Needle (8); Television; The Asset (3)
- Most nominations: Film; The Girl with the Needle (15); Television; Secrets We Keep (6)

The 43rd installment of the Robert Awards, presented by the Danish Film Academy, took place on 31 January 2026 at the Tivoli Hotel & Congress Centre, Copenhagen, Denmark. The ceremony was hosted by actress Marijana Jankovic.

Drama film Second Victims won the Best Danish Film and five other awards. Psychological horror film The Girl with the Needle won the most awards of the ceremony with eight. Other winners included Honey with two, I'm Still Here, Korean Bloom, Min klasse i Grønland, Mr Nobody Against Putin, My Eternal Summer, One Battle After Another, and Sauna with one.

Crime drama television series The Asset won the most awards in the television section with three. Other winners included Generationer, Klovn, and Secrets We Keep with one.

== Winners and nominees ==
The nominations were announced on 8 January 2026. Historical psychological horror film The Girl with the Needle led with fifteen nominations, followed by black comedy film The Last Viking with thirteen and drama film Second Victims with eleven.

Winners are listed first, highlighted in boldface, and indicated with a double dagger (‡).

=== Film ===
**Best Danish Film**: **Second Victims – Producer: Johannes Rothaus Nørregaard; Director and Screenwriter: Zinnini Elkington**‡; The Girl with the Needle – Producers: Malene Blenkov and Mariusz Włodarski; Director: Magnus von Horn; Screenwriters: Line Langebek and Magnus von Horn; Home Sweet Home – Producer: Jonas Bagger; Director and Screenwriter: Frelle Petersen; The Last Viking – Producers: Sisse Graum Jørgensen and Sidsel Hybschmann; Director and Screenwriter: Anders Thomas Jensen; Sauna – Producer: Mads-August Grarup Hertz; Director: Mathias Broe; Screenwriters: William Lippert and Mathias Broe	**Best Director**: **Zinnini Elkington – Second Victims**‡; Mathias Broe – Sauna; Anders Thomas Jensen – The Last Viking; Sylvia Le Fanu – My Eternal Summer; Anders Matthesen and Thorbjørn Christoffersen – Checkered Ninja 3; Magnus von Horn – The Girl with the Needle
**Best Children and Youth Film**: **Honey – Producer: Maria Stevnbak Westergren; Director: Natasha Arthy; Screenwriters: Mette Eike Neerlin and Natasha Arthy**‡; Børnene fra Sølvgade 2: Tager kampen op – Producer: Stephanie Wiese; Director: Mehdi Avaz; Screenwriter: Renée Toft Simonsen; Checkered Ninja 3 – Producers: Anders Mastrup and Trine Heidegaard; Directors: Anders Matthesen and Thorbjørn Christoffersen; Screenwriter: Anders Matthesen; Mira – Producers: Morten Kaufmann and Signe Leick Jensen; Director: Marie Limkilde; Screenwriter: Ida Åkerstrøm Knudsen; Pretty Young Love – Producer: Marcella Dichmann; Director: Mogens Hagedorn; Screenwriter: Line Mørkeby
**Best Original Screenplay**: **Second Victims – Zinnini Elkington**‡; The Girl with the Needle – Line Langebek and Magnus von Horn; Home Sweet Home – Frelle Petersen; My Eternal Summer – Sylvia Le Fanu and Mads Lind Knudsen; To New Beginnings – Jakob Weis	**Best Adapted Screenplay**: **Sauna – William Lippert and Mathias Broe; based on the novel by Mads Ananda Lodahl**‡; Checkered Ninja 3 – Anders Matthesen; based on his book; A Copenhagen Love Story – Ditte Hansen and Louise Mieritz; based on the novel by Tine Høeg; Honey – Natasha Arthy and Mette Eike Neerlin; based on the book Hest, hest, tiger, tiger by Neerlin; Mira – Ida Åkerstrøm Knudsen; based on the book by Sabine Lemire
**Best Actor in a Leading Role**: **Besir Zeciri – The Girl with the Needle as Peter**‡; Magnus Juhl Andersen – Sauna as Johan; Nikolaj Lie Kaas – The Last Viking as Anker; Mads Mikkelsen – The Last Viking as John; Nina Rask – Sauna as William	**Best Actress in a Leading Role**: **Özlem Saglanmak – Second Victims as Alexandra**‡; Mathilde Arcel – Special Unit – The First Murder as Camilla; Freja Klint Sandberg – Three of a Kind as Luis; Jette Søndergaard – Home Sweet Home as Sofie; Victoria Carmen Sonne – The Girl with the Needle as Karoline
**Best Actor in a Supporting Role**: **Anders Mossling – My Eternal Summer as Johan**‡; Lars Brygmann – The Last Viking as Lothar; Lars Brygmann – To New Beginnings as Finn; Jesper Christensen – Honey as Marcel; Joachim Fjelstrup – The Girl with the Needle as Jørgen	**Best Actress in a Supporting Role**: **Trine Dyrholm – The Girl with the Needle as Dagmar**‡; Mathilde Arcel – Second Victims as Emilie; Trine Dyrholm – Second Victims as Camilla; Birthe Neumann – Three of a Kind as Vivi; Maria Rossing – My Eternal Summer as Karin
**Best Production Design**: **The Girl with the Needle – Jagna Dobesz**‡; The End – Jette Lehmann; The Last Viking – Nikolaj Danielsen; Sauna – Signe Krab Nymann; Special Unit – The First Murder – Nikolaj Danielsen and Agata Trojak	**Best Cinematography**: **The Girl with the Needle – Michał Dymek**‡; Acts of Love – Jacob Møller; The Last Viking – Sebastian Blenkov; Sauna – Nicolai Lok; Second Victims – Mia Mai Dengsø Graabæk; Special Unit – The First Murder – Lasse Frank
**Best Costume Design**: **The Girl with the Needle – Małgorzata Fudala**‡; The Last Viking – Rikke Simonsen; Sauna – Benedicte Morre; Special Unit – The First Murder – Małgorzata Fudala; Under the Stars – Emilie Bøge Dresler	**Best Makeup**: **The Girl with the Needle – Anne Cathrine Sauerberg**‡; The Last Viking – Louise Hauberg Lohmann; Special Unit – The First Murder – Henrik Steen; Three of a Kind – Helena Hørdum; Under the Stars – Sofie de Mylius
**Best Editing**: **Second Victims – Ania de Sá**‡; The Girl with the Needle – Agnieszka Glińska; Home Sweet Home – Frelle Petersen; The Last Viking – Nicolaj Monberg and Anders Albjerg Kristiansen; Mr Nobody Against Putin – Nicolaj Monberg and Rebekka Lønqvist; My Eternal Summer – Emma Lagrelius	**Best Sound Design**: **Second Victims – Jakob Strandgaard and Catrine Le Dous**‡; The Girl with the Needle – Oskar Skriver and Morten Pilegaard; Home Sweet Home – Hans Møller; The Last Viking – Eddie Simonsen; Sauna – Mia Terry; Special Unit – The First Murder – Morten Green and Oskar Skriver
**Best Score**: **The Girl with the Needle – Frederikke Hoffmeier**‡; Checkered Ninja 3 – Christian Vinten; The Last Viking – Jeppe Kaas; Mira – Josefine Skov; A Place in the Ring – Astrid Fabrin; Second Victims – Jenny Rossander	**Best Song**: **"Hey Honey" from Honey – Written by Jesper Mechlenburg, Engelina Andrina Larsen, Mette Eike Neerlin, and Natasha Arthy; Performed by Selma Sol í Dali Pape**‡; "All the Pretty Boys" from Sauna – Written and Performed by Anton Falck; "All These Wilted Trees" from Second Victims – Written and Performed by Lydmor; "Fra mine tanker til min mund" from A Love Like No Other – Written and Performed by Søren Huss; "Sidste Omgang" from Checkered Ninja 3 – Written by Anders Matthesen, Jonathan Elkjær and Christian Vinten; Performed by Anders Matthesen
**Best Visual Effects**: **The Girl with the Needle – Peter Hjorth**‡; The End – Peter Hjorth and Mikael Windelin; The Last Viking – Peter Hjorth and Hummer Højmark; Special Unit – The First Murder – Jeppe Bingestam; To New Beginnings – Peter Hjorth and Hummer Højmark	**Best Short Fiction/Animation**: **Korean Bloom – Producers: Maja Foss Hagerup and Rosa Flindt Riis-Hansen; Director and Screenwriter: Lin Jo Skytte**‡; Ladybugs – Producer: Anine Xinh Lodberg; Director: Thor Zing; Screenwriter: Asta Bech Zachariassen; Ritardando – Producer: Ida Holmgren; Director: Selma Sunniva; Screenwriter: Kristoffer Bjerg; Sir Stella – Producers: Ann Sofie Grøndal and Christian Lønhart; Director: Lina Vain Illalla; Screenwriters: Lina Vain Illalla and Kristoffer Bjerg; What Remains – Producers: Maja Foss Hagerup and Rosa Flindt Riis-Hansen; Director and Screenwriter: Malthe Jagd Miehe-Renard
**Best Documentary Feature**: **Mr Nobody Against Putin – Producer: Helle Faber; Directors: David Borenstein and Pavel Talankin**‡; Cirkeline og den usynlige tegner – Producer: Cæcilie Østerby Sørensen; Director: Esther Wellejus; Dear Tomorrow – Producers: Maria Helga Stürup and Katrine A. Sahlstrøm; Director: Kaspar Astrup Schröder; The Father, the Sons and the Holy Spirit – Producer: Mira Jargil; Director: Christian Sønderby Jepsen; Mommy's Boy – Producer: Helle Faber; Director: Jesper Dalgaard	**Best Documentary Short**: **Min klasse i Grønland – Producer: Mette Mailand; Director: Ulla Søe**‡; After the Abyss – Producers: Ulrikke Xenia and Ane Vennize Andersen; Director: Keiria Shishay; Born to Fight – Producer: Rikke Tambo Andersen; Director: Ala'A Mohsen; Brødre – Producer: Mikkel Smidt; Director: Rosa Lie; Welcome Home – Producer: Emilia Moth; Director: Maria Winther Olsen
**Best Non-English Language Film**: **I'm Still Here in Portuguese – Director: Walter Salles; Distributor: Camera Film**‡; Dreams (Sex Love) in Norwegian – Director: Dag Johan Haugerud; Distributor: Camera Film; Emilia Pérez in Spanish – Director: Jacques Audiard; Distributor: SF Studios; Love in Norwegian – Director: Dag Johan Haugerud; Distributor: Camera Film; There's Still Tomorrow in Romanesco dialect – Director: Paola Cortellesi; Distributor: Camera Film	**Best English Language Film**: **One Battle After Another – Director: Paul Thomas Anderson; Distributor: Warner Bros. Denmark**‡; The Brutalist – Director: Brady Corbet; Distributor: United International Pictures; Bugonia – Director: Yorgos Lanthimos; Distributor: United International Pictures; A Complete Unknown – Director: James Mangold; Distributor: The Walt Disney Company; A Real Pain – Director: Jesse Eisenberg; Distributor: The Walt Disney Company

==== Films with multiple nominations and awards ====
Films that received multiple nominations
Nominations	Film
15	The Girl with the Needle
13	The Last Viking
11	Second Victims
10	Sauna
7	Special Unit – The First Murder
5	Checkered Ninja 3
5	Home Sweet Home
5	My Eternal Summer
4	Honey
3	Mira
3	Three of a Kind
3	To New Beginnings
2	The End
2	Mr Nobody Against Putin
2	Under the Stars

Films that received multiple awards
Awards	Film
8	The Girl with the Needle
6	Second Victims
2	Honey

=== Television ===
**Best Danish Television Series**: **Secrets We Keep – Producer: Claudia Saginario; Head Writer: Ingeborg Topsøe; Pilot Director: Per Fly (Netflix)**‡; The Asset – Producers: Jacob Jarek and Marta Mleczek; Head Writers: Frederik Ringtved, Samanou Acheche Sahlstrøm, and Adam August; Pilot Director: Samanou Acheche Sahlstrøm (Netflix); Carmen Curlers – Producer: Maja Dyekjær; Head Writer: Mette Heeno; Pilot Director: Natasha Arthy (DR1); The Excavation – Producers: Stinna Lassen and Claudia Saginario; Head Writer: Lars K. Andersen; Pilot Director: Dagur Kári (TV 2); Generationer – Producers: Birgitte Rask and Mie Andreasen; Head Writer and Pilot Director: Anna Emma Haudal (DR1)	**Best Short Television Series**: **Klovn – Producer: Barbara Crone; Head Writer: Casper Christensen and Frank Hvam; Pilot Director: Casper Christensen (TV 2 Play)**‡; Behind Every Man – Producer: Claudia Siesbye Halsted; Head Writers and Pilot Directors: Julie Rudbæk and Jesper Zuschlag (DR TV); Familier i Norden – Producer: Troels Kampmann Kjær; Head Writers: Bashar El-Zouheiri and Christian Gamst Miller-Harris; Pilot Director: Milan Ganesan (TV 2 Play); Jordemoder mellem liv og død – Producer: Malene Flindt Pedersen; Head Writer and Pilot Director: Louise Leth (TV 2); Scooter Boys – Producers: Maria Møller Christoffersen and Rasmus Ladefoged; Pilot Director: Jonatan Nothlev (DR1)
**Best Actor in a Leading Television Role**: **Afshin Firouzi – The Asset as Miran (Netflix)**‡; Morten Hee Anderson – Carmen Curlers as Axel Byvang (DR1); Anders W. Berthelsen – The Excavation as Michael (TV 2); Frank Hvam – Klovn as Frank (TV 2 Play); Arian Kashef – Familier i Norden as Sami (TV 2 Play)	**Best Actress in a Leading Television Role**: **Clara Dessau – The Asset as Tea (Netflix)**‡; Lene Maria Christensen – The Excavation as Ester (TV 2); Marie Bach Hansen – Secrets We Keep as Cecilie (Netflix); Iben Hjejle – Løgnen as Rie (TV 2); Maria Rossing – Carmen Curlers as Birthe Windfeld (DR1)
**Best Actor in a Supporting Television Role**: **Jan Linnebjerg – Generationer as Jesper (DR1)**‡; Nicolas Bro – The Asset as Folke (Netflix); Nicolai Jørgensen – Carmen Curlers as Frans (DR1); Lars Ranthe – Secrets We Keep as Rasmus (Netflix); Simon Sears – Secrets We Keep as Mike (Netflix)	**Best Actress in a Supporting Television Role**: **Maria Cordsen – The Asset as Ashley (Netflix)**‡; Danica Curcic – Secrets We Keep as Katarina (Netflix); Stephanie León – Løgnen as Anette (TV 2); Anette Støvelbæk – Generationer as Tina (DR1); Sara Fanta Traore – Secrets We Keep as Aicha (Netflix)

==== Shows with multiple nominations and awards ====
Shows that received multiple nominations
Nominations	Show
6	Secrets We Keep
5	The Asset
4	Carmen Curlers
3	The Excavation
3	Generationer
2	Familier i Norden
2	Klovn
2	Løgnen

Shows that received multiple awards
Awards	Show
3	The Asset

=== Special awards ===
**Audience Award**: **The Last Viking**‡; Børnene fra Sølvgade 2: Tager kampen op; Checkered Ninja 3; The Girl with the Needle; Home Sweet Home; Mugge & Super Happy; Second Victims; Special Unit - The First Murder; To New Beginnings; Under the Stars	**Pluto TV Talentprisen**: **Camilla Arlien (Director) – If I Die Today**‡; Albert Arthur Amiryan (Actor) – Crossing Lines and Generationer; Charlotte Brodthagen (Director) – Three of a Kind; Morten Agerholm Jensen (Actor) – A Love Like No Other; Frederik Ringtved (Screenwriter) – The Asset
**Robert Honorary Award**: **Marianne Christensen**	**The Ib Award**: **Trine Heidegaard**
