= Trom =

Trom may refer to:

- Trom (DC Comics), a fictional planet in the DC Universe
- Trom (TV series), a 2022 Faroese television crime drama series

== See also ==
- Trom agus Éadrom, an Irish television variety show (1975–1985)
- Troms, a county in Norway
