= Hans Tórgarð =

Faroese actor and director

- Born: Hans Christoffer Wenningsted Tórgarð; Faroe Islands
- Occupations: Actor, director
- Years active: 1991–present

Hans Christoffer Wenningsted Tórgarð (born 1969), better known as Hans Tórgarð, is a Faroese actor, director and dramatist. In the Faroe Islands he is mainly known for acting on stage and for his work as a voice actor in Faroese radio plays and children's TV-series translated into Faroese. In 2015 and 2016 he plays the role as Dvalinn in the Icelandic TV-series Trapped.

== Background ==
Tórgarð grew up in Kvívík, Faroe Islands. His father was Axel Tórgarð, a priest and translator, he translated among other works the Lord of the Rings trilogy and the Hobbit into Faroese. Tórgarð's sisters Ria and Súsanna are well known actors in their native Faroe Islands. His grandfather was the Faroese architect H. C .W. Tórgarð.

The Tórgarð children were all very interested in acting and theater. Once the children hosted a birthday party and set up the play Hansel and Gretel all by themselves. In a 1998 interview the siblings looked back on their childhood and talked about how they began acting as children. "Mother was the one that taught acting to us and the other children in the village. She obtained the plays and served as a whisperer at performances".

Tórgarð obtained Master of Arts in theater at Teaterhögskolan in Helsinki, Finland in 1999. He has played in numerous roles on stage at the Faroese National Theater since 1991. He has also voiced several characters for Faroese children's television.

== Career ==
=== Stage actor ===
- Meðan vit bíða eftir Godot (Samuel Beckett) 2011
- Kirsiberjagarðurin (Anton P. Tjekhov) 2010
- Vatnið vinnur harðar hellur 2010
- The Danny Crowe Show (David Farr) 2010
- Aftaná Undrið (Jóanes Nielsen) 2009
- Í Geyma (Dánjal Hoydal) 2008
- Cafe Grugg, Tjóðpallurin 2008
- Eg eri mín egna kona (Doug Wright) - Tjóðpallurin 2007
- Náttarherbergið (Maxim Gorky) - Tjóðpallurin 2007
- Í Óðamansgarði (William Heinesen/Dánjal Hoydal, Sunleif Rasmussen) - Tjóðpallurin 2006
- Peer Gynt (Henrik Ibsen) Gríma 2003
- List (Yasmina Reza) Gríma 2002
- MacBeth (William Shakespeare) Gríma, Teater Västernorrland, Turnékompaniet 2002
- Eitur nakað land week-end? (Jóanes Nielsen) Gríma 2001
- Serlingar (Regin Patursson) SvF 2000
- Glæma og Máttur (Sigga Vang) Svan Film 2000
- Móðir Sjeystjørna (William Heinesen/Egi Dam) Gríma 2000
- Oliver Twist (Charles Dickens/Hans Rosenquist) Gríma 1997
- Góða Jelena (Ljudmila Razumovskaya) Gríma 1994
- Royndin – variatiónir yvir Nólsoyar Páll (Egi Dam) Gríma 1993
- Glataðu Spælimenninir (William Heinesen/Jørgen Ljungdahl) Leikarafelag Føroya and The Nordic House 1993
- Sjeynda Boð – stjal eitt sindur minni (Dario Fo) Leikarafelag Føroya 1991

=== Actor and/or translator ===
- Piaf (Pam Gems) Havnar Sjónleikarfelag 2006 (translation)
- Elling og Kjell Bjarni (Ingvar Ambjørnsen) Gríma 2004 (translator and actor)
- Góðir dagar (Samuel Beckett) Gríma 2002 (translation)
- Krypilin úr Inishmaan (Martin McDonagh) Gríma 2000 (translator and actor)
- Óndskapurin (Jan Guillou/Benny Haag) Gríma 1999 (translator and actor)
- Liva tikarar í Congo (Bengt Ahlfors, Johan Bargum) Gríma 1992 (translator and actor)

=== Playwright/dramatizing ===
- Momo, Tjóðpallur Føroya, 2005 (dramatizing by Michael Ende. Hans Tórgarð wrote playwright together with Ria Tórgarð, Hans Tórgarð was also actor)
- Søgur úr Krabburð (dramatizing by J.P.Heinesen together with Bárður Persson) Gríma 2003, also actor
- Risans Hjarta, Gríma 2002 (manuscript together with Gunnvá Zachariassen) also actor
- My Little Darling, Teater Viirus 1999 (Playwright together with Jonte Ramsten and Anders Öhrström) - also actor
- Lívstrá, Gríma 1998 (manuscript from the letters of V. van Goghs.) Also actor
- Eldførið, Norðurlandahúsið 1996 (dramatizing by H.C.Andersen.) Hans Tórgarð was also actor
- Vættrarnir av Galdralondum, Sjónvarp Føroya 1992 (Playwright together with Katarina Nolsøe) - also actor

=== Theatre director, playwright and scenography ===
- Seinasta bandið hjá Krapp (Samuel Beckett) 2013 (director)
- Kvinnan í svørtum (Stephen Mallatratt), 2008 (director)
- Othello (William Shakespeare) Huðrar 2008 (director)
- Eg eri mín egna kona (Doug Wright) Tjóðpallur Føroya 2008 (translator, director, scenography, actor)
- Náttin áðrenn Skógin, (Bernard-Marie Koltés) Tjóðpallur Føroya 2007 (director)
- Harpuríma, Havnar Sjónleikarfelag 2006 (playwright and director)
- Søgan um ein soldát (I. Stravinsky, F.Ramuz) Aldubáran and Tjóðpallur Føroya 2006 (director)
- Fótur í Hosu, Gríma 2001 (playwright together with Súsonna Tórgarð, scenography og director)
- Rumbul í Húsi, Gríma 1998 (playwright together with Súsonna Tórgarð og Katarina Nolsøe, og director)
- Harpuríma, Leikbólkurin 1995 (playwright and director)
- Fýra Ung (playwright together with Óli Olsen, and director) Primus Productions 1994

== Filmography ==
- Trapped (TV-series) (2015-2016) as Dvalinn the engineer
- A Faraway Land (Feature film) (2021) as Sigmund Garðalíð
- Trom (TV-series) (2022) as Haraldur Martinsson
