= A Taste of Hunger =

2021 film by Christoffer Boe

- Directed by: Christoffer Boe
- Written by: Christoffer Boe; Tobias Lindholm
- Produced by: Sisse Graum Jørgensen; Louise Vesth; Lizette Jonjic
- Starring: Katrine Greis-Rosenthal; Nikolaj Coster-Waldau
- Cinematography: Manuel Alberto Claro
- Edited by: My Thordal
- Music by: Anthony Lledo; Mikkel Maltha
- Release date: 24 June 2021 (Denmark)
- Running time: 100 minutes
- Country: Denmark
- Language: Danish
- Budget: €3.2 million

A Taste of Hunger (Danish: Smagen af sult) is a 2021 feature film directed by Christoffer Boe. It was co-written by Boe and Tobias Lindholm.

== Plot ==
The film follows a couple, Maggie (Greis-Rosenthal) and Carsten (Coster-Waldau), who work in the high-end restaurant industry. The plot revolves around their personal lives and sacrifices as they try to earn a Michelin star.

== Cast ==
- Katrine Greis-Rosenthal, Maggi
- Nikolaj Coster-Waldau, Carsten
- Charlie Gustafsson, Frederik
- Nicolas Bro, Torben
- Flora Augusta, Chloe
- August Vinkel, August
- Maj-Britt Mathiesen, Pia
- Dag Malmberg, Stellan
- Rasmus Hammerich, Frank
- Luise Skov, Malou
- Sofie Torp, class teacher

== Release ==
A Taste of Hunger was released in June 2021 in Denmark by Nordisk Film Distribution. TrustNordisk sold the film internationally to various distributors, including Magnolia Pictures in the United States, Kinovista in France, Hagi Film in Poland, Koch Films in Germany, and others.
