= Second Victims =

2025 Danish drama film

- Film poster
- Danish: Det andet offer
- Directed by: Zinnini Elkington
- Written by: Zinnini Elkington
- Produced by: Johannes Rothaus Nørregaard
- Starring: Özlem Sağlanmak
- Cinematography: Mia Mai Dengsø Graabæk
- Edited by: Ania de Sá
- Music by: Jenny Rossander
- Production company: Meta Film
- Release date: 10 April 2025 (Denmark)
- Running time: 92 minutes
- Country: Denmark
- Language: Danish

Second Victims (Danish: Det andet offer) is a 2025 Danish drama film written and directed by Zinnini Elkington in her feature directorial debut. Starring Özlem Sağlanmak, the film follows Alexandra, a young neurologist who navigates an understaffed hospital ward.

The film was released in Denmark on 10 April 2025. It won the Best Danish Film and five other awards at the 43rd Robert Awards.

== Premise ==
A young skilled neurologist confronts the consequences of her medical errors during a high-pressure shift.

== Cast ==
- Özlem Saglanmak as Alexandra
- Trine Dyrholm as Camilla
- Mathilde Arcel Fock as Emilie
- Olaf Johannessen as Esben
- Iman Meskini as Alda
- Anders Matthesen as Karl
- Morten Hee Andersen as Anders

== Production ==
Zinnini Elkington, the film's director and screenwriter, grew up in a family of health professionals. The idea of Second Victims was developed during a conversation between her and her sister, who is also a doctor. The term "second victim" is commonly used to describe the healthcare professionals who experience severe distress after being involved in an unanticipated adverse patient event. It was introduced in an article written by Albert Wu in 2000.

In April 2024, it was reported that REinvent acquired the film's international sales. It was also announced that SF Studios would distribute the film in Nordic countries. In September 2024, the project participated at the Finnish Film Affair. The film was presented at the Nordic Market Screenings during the Nordic Film Market, held at the Gothenburg Film Festival in January 2025.

Principal photography took place on location at the Herlev Hospital in Herlev from January to February 2024.

== Release ==
Second Victims was released in Danish theatres on 10 April 2025. It garnered more than 87,000 admissions during its run. It was selected to screen at the Kaleidoscope section at the Filmfest Hamburg in September 2025. In October 2025, it was screened at the Film Fest Gent.

== Accolades ==
| Award / Film Festival | Date of ceremony | Category | Recipient(s) | Result | Ref. |
|---|---|---|---|---|---|
| Filmfest Hamburg | 7 October 2025 | Critics' Choice Award | Zinnini Elkington | Won | |
| Robert Awards | 31 January 2026 | Best Danish Film | Johannes Rothaus Nørregaard and Zinnini Elkington | Won | |
| Robert Awards | 31 January 2026 | Best Director | Zinnini Elkington | Won | |
| Robert Awards | 31 January 2026 | Best Original Screenplay | Zinnini Elkington | Won | |
| Robert Awards | 31 January 2026 | Best Actress in a Leading Role | Özlem Saglanmak | Won | |
| Robert Awards | 31 January 2026 | Best Actress in a Supporting Role | Mathilde Arcel | Nominated | |
| Robert Awards | 31 January 2026 | Best Actress in a Supporting Role | Trine Dyrholm | Nominated | |
| Robert Awards | 31 January 2026 | Best Cinematography | Mia Mai Dengsø Graabæk | Nominated | |
| Robert Awards | 31 January 2026 | Best Editing | Ania de Sá | Won | |
| Robert Awards | 31 January 2026 | Best Sound Design | Jakob Strandgaard and Catrine Le Dous | Won | |
| Robert Awards | 31 January 2026 | Best Score | Jenny Rossander | Nominated | |
| Robert Awards | 31 January 2026 | Best Song | "All These Wilted Trees" by Lydmor | Nominated | |
