= Legenden =

Legenden may refer to:

- The Danish title of The Asset, a 2025 Danish series on Netflix
- "Legenden", a 2018 song by German musician Max Giesinger
