= Olaf Johannessen (actor) =

Faroese actor (born 1961)

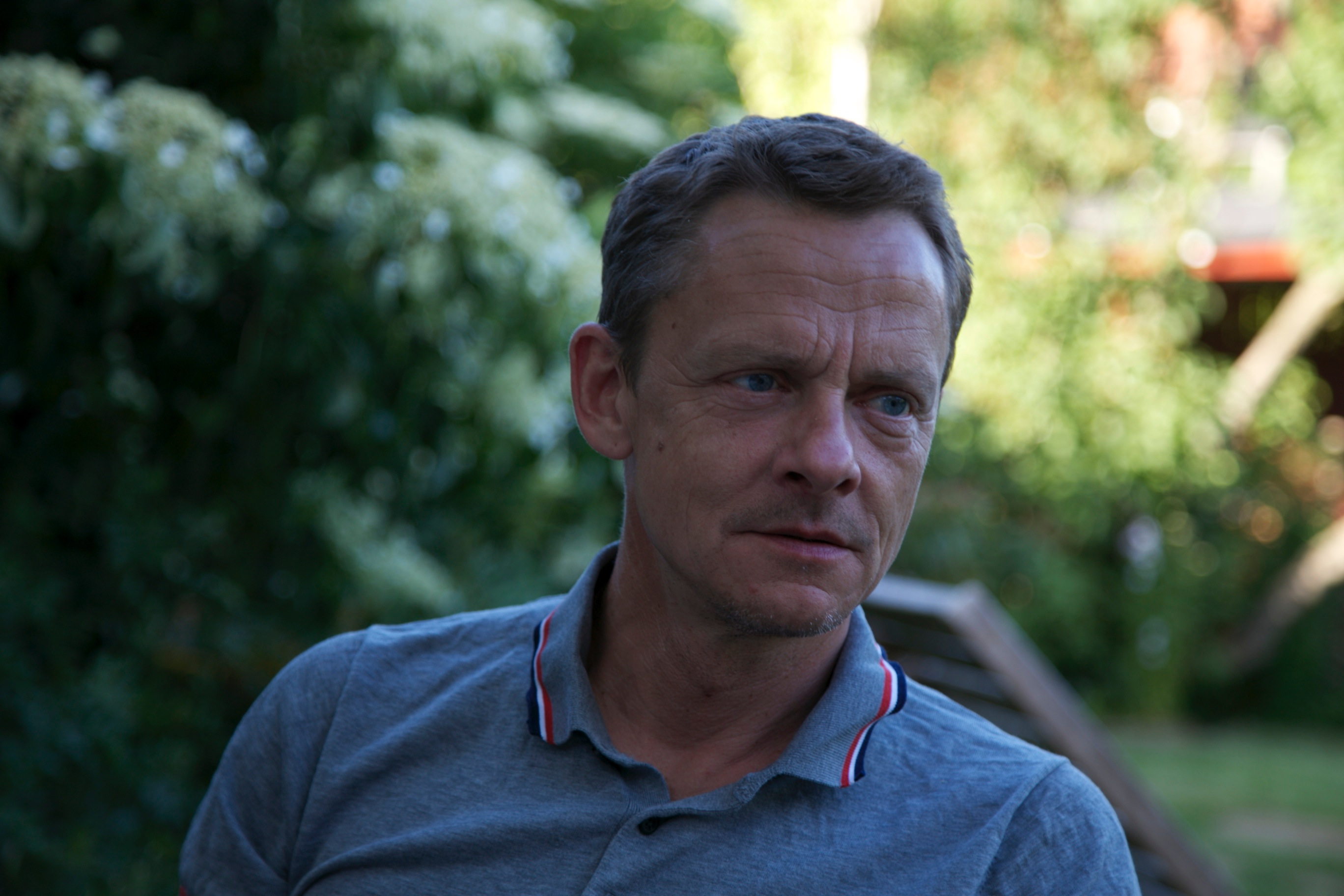
- Born: 8 July 1961 (age 65); Tórshavn, Faroe Islands
- Occupation: Actor
- Years active: 1986–present
- Partner: Marita Dalsgaard
- Children: 5

Olaf Heine Johannessen (born 8 July 1961) is a Faroese actor. Born in Tórshavn, Faroe Islands, he grew up in a family of actors. He studied at the Danish National School of Theatre in Odense and began his acting career in Aarhus Theatre. He later became a member of the ensemble at the Royal Danish Theatre. He has played a variety of roles, including the lead roles in "Hamlet", "Faust", “Mephisto” and “Puntila” among others.

He has received the Reumert Prize, Denmark's most prestigious award for theater, for his leading roles in "Puntilla," "Mephisto," and "Det store stilhæfte." He also won the Robert Prize for Best Supporting Actor for his role as Kristian Kamper in the “Killing" and was nominated for “Der Faust”, the prestigious German theater award, for his performance as Peer Gynt in Peer Gynt at Düsseldorfer Schauspielhaus in Düsseldorf. He was awarded the cultural prize of the Faroe Islands in 2021 for his contribution to the arts. He was appointed the Knight’s Cross 1.degree of the Order of Dannebrog in 2020.

Johannessen has also worked as a voice actor. He co-founded the theater group Leikhús Skift with his wife Marita Dalsgaard.

== Theatre roles in selection ==
Year	Theater	Play	Writer	Director	Role(s)
2009	Teatret ved Sorte Hest	Hjorten	Vivian Nielsen	Vivian Nielsen	Jarl
2009	Royal Danish Theatre (Guestplay on Royal Dramatic Theatre)	Language of Hope	Das Beckwerk	Das Beckwerk	The Medium
2009	Royal Danish Theatre	Richard III	William Shakespeare	Staffan Valdemar Holm	Lord Grey, 1st morderer, King Edward IV, Young Richard of York, Stanley, Mayor of London
2009	Mammutteatret	PPP	Claus Flygare	Minna Johannesson	Pier Paolo Pasolini
2009	Café Teatret	Krasnoyarsk	Johan Harstad	Line Paulsen	The Anthropologist
2009	Royal Danish Theatre	Rødt og grønt (Red and Green)	Astrid Saalbach	Søren Iversen	Manne
2011–2014	Düsseldorfer Schauspielhaus	Karte und Gebiet	Michel Houellebecq	Falk Richter	Michel Houellebecq
2013–2014	Düsseldorfer Schauspielhaus	Peer Gynt	Henrik Ibsen	Staffan Valdemar Holm	Peer Gynt
2013	Grønnegårds Teatret	Fruentimmerskolen	Molière	Madeleine Røn Juul	Arnolphe
2014	Betty Nansen Teatret	Samtale før døden	Adam Price	Peter Langdal	Adolf Eichmann
2014–2015	Betty Nansen Teatret	Mefisto	Ariane Mnouchkine	Peter Langdal	Hendrik Höfgen
2015	Det Kongelige Teater	Heksejagt	Arthur Miller	Roger Vontobel	John Proctor
2015–16	Schauspielhaus Bochum	Rose Bernd	Gerhard Hauptmann	Roger Vontobel	Christof Flamm
2015–16	Det Kongelige Teater	Puntila	Bertolt Brecht	Staffan Valdemar Holm	Puntila

== Filmography ==
Year	Film	Director	Role	Comments
1999–2000	Morten Korch - Ved stillebækken		Ole Stillebæk	TV series, TV2
2009	Alting bliver godt igen	Christoffer Bro	Michael	Film
2010	Pagten	Jesper W. Nielsen	Kim Landbetjent	Nordic Christmas calendar, DR1
2010	Blekingegade	Jacob Thuesen	Kenneth Ebbe	TV series, TV2
2012	Borgen	Jannik Johansen	Jørgen Hedegaard	TV series, DR1
2012	The Killing, III	Kristoffer Nyholm	Kristian Kamper	TV series, DR1
2014	1864	Ole Bornedal	Carl Christian Hall	TV series, DR1
2015	Skammerens Datter	Kenneth Kainz	Mester Maunus	Film
2015	Broen III	Henrik Georgsson-Rumle Hammerich	Lars	TV series, DR1
2021	Face to Face	Christoffer Boe	John Ryt	TV series
2022	Trom	Kaspar Barfoed, Peter Ahlén, Davíd Óskar Ólafsson	Ragnar í Rong	TV series
2024	Sons	Gustav Möller	Head of Institution	Premiere at the 74th Berlin International Film Festival
2025	Second Victims	Zinnini Elkington	Esben	Film

== Awards and recognition ==
- 2004: Olaf Poulsens Mindelegat
- 2009: Poul Reumerts Mindelegat
- 2010: Lauritzen Award
- 2013: Robert Award for best male supporting role in TV series
- 2013: Der Faust (category actor in play) - nominated as the best actor
- 2013: Nominated to the Teaterpokalen
- 3 December 2013: Knight of the Order of the Dannebrog
- 2014: Received the Ole Haslunds kunstnerlegat
- 2014: Received the Teaterpokalen
- 2014: Elected as Årets skuespiller (Best Danish male actor of the year) by Berlingske.
- 2015: Received the Reumert prize for best leading role (male) in Samtale før døden and Mefisto, Betty Nansen Teatret, and Heksejagt, Det Kongelige Teater
- 2016: Received the Reumert prize for best leading role (male) in Puntila, Det Kongelige Teater.
