= Everything Will Be Fine (2010 film) =

2010 film

- Theatrical release poster
- Directed by: Christoffer Boe
- Written by: Christoffer Boe
- Produced by: Tine Grew Pfeiffer
- Starring: Jens Albinus; Marijana Janković; Paprika Steen; Nicolas Bro
- Cinematography: Manuel Alberto Claro
- Edited by: Peter Brandt
- Music by: Sylvain Chauveau
- Production company: AlphaVille Pictures Copenhagen
- Release date: 28 January 2010
- Running time: 90 minutes
- Country: Denmark
- Language: Danish

Everything Will Be Fine (Danish: Alting bliver godt igen) is a 2010 Danish film directed by Christoffer Boe, who also wrote the screenplay. The film was screened at the 2010 Cannes Film Festival.

== Cast ==
- Jens Albinus as Falk
- Marijana Janković as Helena
- Paprika Steen as Siri
- Nicolas Bro as Håkon
- Søren Malling as Karl
- Henning Moritzen as Lemmy

== Reception ==
Boyd van Hoeij of Variety called the film, "[the] most slickly commercial pic yet".
