= Aarup =

- Town
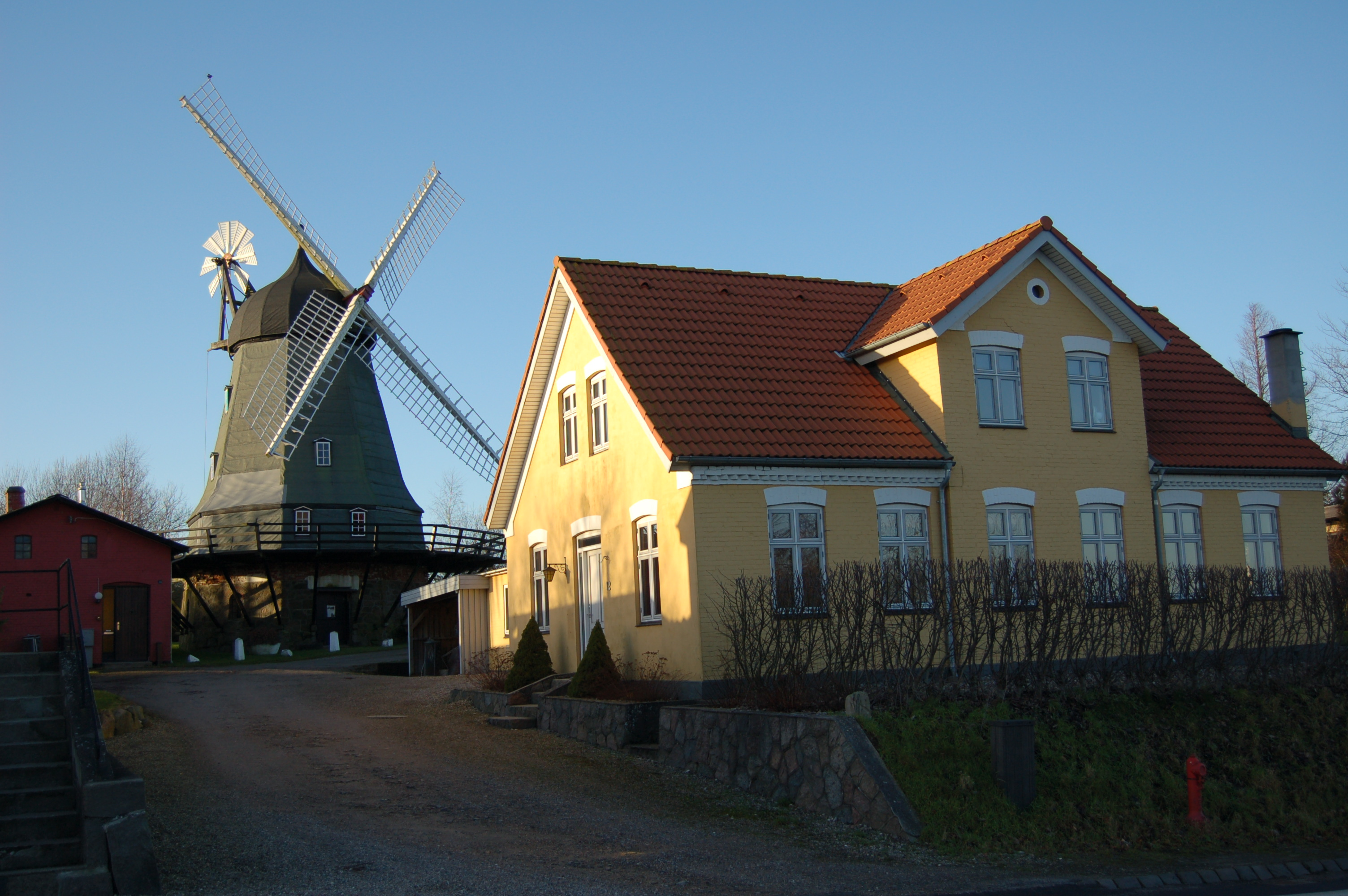
- Aarup windmill

- Location in Denmark Aarup (Region of Southern Denmark)
- Coordinates: 55°22′33″N 10°2′57″E
- Country: Denmark
- Region: Southern Denmark
- Municipality: Assens Municipality

Area
  - Urban: 2.3 km^{2} (0.89 sq mi)

Population (2026)
  - Urban: 3,254
  - Urban density: 1,400/km^{2} (3,700/sq mi)
  - Gender: 1,542 males and 1,712 females
- Time zone: UTC+1 (CET)
  - Summer (DST): UTC+2 (CEST)
- Postal code: DK-5560 Aarup

Aarup is a railway town in central Denmark with a population of 3,254 (1 January 2026), located in Assens municipality on the island of Funen in Region of Southern Denmark.

Aarup can trace its history back to 1500, but it did not become a town until the 1860s. It was located in Skydebjerg-Orte municipality until 1966 and was the municipal seat of Aarup Municipality until 2007.

Aarup is served by Aarup railway station, located on the railway line across Funen.

== Notable people ==
- Thorvald Andersen (1883 in Aarup – 1935 in Frederiksberg) a Danish architect
- Lydmor a Danish singer
