= Face to Face (Danish TV series) =

Danish TV drama series

- Genre: Crime drama police procedural Nordic noir
- Created by: Christoffer Boe
- Screenplay by: Christoffer Boe; Jakob Weis; Anna Juul; Lasse Kyed Rasmussen
- Directed by: Christoffer Boe
- Starring: Trine Dyrholm; Alma Ekehed Thomsen; Ulrich Thomsen; Lars Mikkelsen; Søren Malling; Olaf Johannessen
- Music by: Anthony Lledo, Mikkel Maltha
- Country of origin: Denmark
- Original language: Danish
- No. of seasons: 3
- No. of episodes: 24

Production
- Producers: Jonas Allen, Peter Bose
- Running time: 22–29 min
- Production companies: Viaplay, Miso Film

Original release
- Network: TV3
- Release: 15 November 2019 – 12 March 2023

Related
- Suspect (2022, 2024)

Face to Face or Forhøret (literally, The interrogation) is a Danish television crime drama and police procedural. Season one was broadcast from 15 November 2019 by Viaplay on TV3. It was created and directed by Christoffer Boe, who also co-wrote the screenplay. The entire series spans 24 episodes across three seasons of eight episodes each. The other co-writers are Jakob Weis (2019), Anna Juul (2021) and Lasse Kyed Rasmussen (2023). Season one stars Ulrich Thomsen as police detective Bjørn and Alma Ekehed Thomsen as his estranged daughter Christina. It introduces Trine Dyrholm as Christina's psychologist mother Susanne, Lars Mikkelsen as entrepreneur Holger, Christina's mentor and Søren Malling as police chief Richard. Ulrich and Alma are real-life father and daughter.

For the second season, which was broadcast from 29 August 2021, Dyrholm reprises her role as Susanne. It is set 26 days after Christina's death. Susanne is the main protagonist, who learns her new patient, John (Olaf Johannessen), under hypnosis, recalls details of killing young women. John is due to kill another woman, Sapphire (Fanny Leander Bornedal), tonight. Mikkelsen reprises his role as Holger in the third and final season of Face to Face, which began on 19 February 2023. Holger receives a video depicting Christina's murder, which leads him to question own family members and business associates. The first two seasons have been adapted by Matt Baker for the British TV series version, Suspect (2022, 2024).

== Premise ==
Bjørn attends a Jane Doe corpse in the morgue. It's his estranged daughter, Christina. Bjørn cannot accept Frank's verdict of suicide. He begins questioning Frank for further details. Over the course of the day, he successively interrogates people in Christina's life. Nikki describes Christina's work as a prostitute for a darkweb site, Blacknet. Mia partied with Christina and brought her into a drug dealing lifestyle. Drug lord, Sebastian provides further details of Christina's lucrative Blacknet operations. CCTV from Sebastian's nightclub shows she left with Rylander after midnight. Rylander points Bjørn to Holger, who had taken a mentor role with Christina. Holger had encouraged her in Blacknet, but she wanted to discontinue. Bjørn has become convinced that Christina did indeed suicide. He meets ex-wife Susanne to farewell their daughter's corpse. Susanne reveals she had an affair with Frank, which began the previous Christmas. Bjørn now notices that Christina's upper lip has a split frenulum. This implies her mouth had been clamped closed by her killer. Susanne alibis Frank for the time of death. Bjørn returns to Frank, accusing him of falsifying the autopsy report by omission. Frank claims their boss, Richard, had ordered him. Richard denies the falsification and provides his alibi during the time of death. Bjørn deduces that Frank also falsified the time of death, to give him Susanne's alibi. Bjørn stabs Frank to death and is arrested for murder.

Susanne is consulted by John, who wants to stop smoking. Susanne hypnotises John, who reveals he kills women and is due to kill another tonight. John abruptly leaves, while Susanne informs Richard of John's threat. Richard is unwilling to open an investigation without substantial evidence. Conversely, Richard asks Susanne to have Bjørn certified as insane. Susanne successively interviews people. Charlotte confirms undocumented women have disappeared; she recalls Louise reported a kidnapped woman. Louise hesitantly describes her witness, Sapphire, who worked for Sebastian. Louise advises Susanne to consult Bjørn. On the pretext of psychologically assessing Bjørn, Susanne visits his prison and learns Sebastian/Bjark owns Lady Love. Susanne meets Sapphire, who eventually admits John kidnapped Julia for stealing from Lady Love. Susanne warns Sapphire that she may be John's next victim. Sapphire runs off, leaving behind her phone. Susanne gets help from CC, who uses Sapphire's phone to trace her to North Harbour. CC hands over a gun for Susanne. When spotted by police, CC surrenders, but they shoot him. Susanne continues following Sapphire, where she enters a psychologists' convention. Susanne's trail leads to Maja, who boards a train. Holding Maja at gunpoint, Susanne learns John has a boat back at North Harbour. Susanne finds Sapphire, but is also captured by John. Susanne had already hidden her gun in Sapphire's jacket. John takes both women to a derelict building and ties them into chairs. Susanne is able to distract John long enough for Sapphire to get free and drop the gun. Susanne picks it up and shoots John. The women leave.

Some days later. Holger sees video of Christina's murder by John. John must have been sent by Markus. Markus admits to ordering John to tail Christina. Markus contends that John killed her for his own reasons. John took video to show someone: it was a paid hit. Holger pressures Markus to reveal who helped. Markus runs downstairs and while struggling, Markus accidentally falls to his death. Holger hides the corpse in a storeroom. Markus' phone shows messages from Liz. Liz helped Markus write contract with building supplier, ComTech. Markus' CCTV shows him consulting with Otto. Holger fires Liz and meets Otto at North Harbour building site. From Otto's answers, Holger deduces that Otto had sabotaged the site to hire ComTech instead. Otto points to Rupert as sponsoring ComTach, which would lead to Holger's resignation. Rupert claims he would never align with Otto or Markus. Police arrive at Lang Towers. Holger describes Markus' death, asks Rupert to erase the building's CCTV. Holger is confronted by Richard, who wants to interview Markus about John. Police impound Markus' car before Holger can search it for Markus' meeting schedule. Richard barters for CCTV access, which shows Holger hiding Markus' corpse. Holger arrested by Richard; Holger knocks Richard down. Richard's phone shows meeting with Viktor. Viktor admits to owning ComTech and helping Marcus topple Holger. Holger accuses Viktor of conspiring to kill Christina. Viktor counters that they wanted to get rid of Christina, not kill her. Viktor sees news report of Markus' death. He professes loving Markus. Camilla smuggles Holger into the hospital morgue, where he visits Markus' corpse. Camilla reveals Holger's not Elisabeth's biological son, he's adopted. Holger questions Elisabeth and Henrik. He learns of machinations to replace Holger with Rupert as CEO.

== Cast and characters ==
=== Main cast ===
- Trine Dyrholm as Susanne Egholm: psychologist, hypnotherapist. Christina's mother, Bjørn's ex-wife (Series 1-2)
- Alma Ekehed Thomsen as Christina Rasmussen: Bjørn and Susanne's daughter, Nikki's wife (Series 1-3)
- Ulrich Thomsen as Bjørn Rasmussen: Copenhagen police detective, Christina's father, Susanne's ex-husband (Series 1-2)
- Lars Mikkelsen as Holger Lang: Lang Enterprises CEO, philosophy-law professor, entrepreneur, horse owner, Christina's mentor (Series 1, 3)
- Søren Malling as Richard Meyer/Lund: police chief, Bjørn's boss (Series 1-3)
- Olaf Johannessen as John Ryt: Susanne's new client, requests hypnosis to stop smoking (Series 2-3)

=== Season one only ===
- Nikolaj Lie Kaas as Sebastian a.k.a. Bjarke: nightclub owner, drug lord, Lady Love strip club owner, prostitutes' pimp, initially supplied drugs and women by Mia. Former policeman alongside Bjørn
- David Dencik as Rylander: policeman, Bjørn's former partner, Lassen's current partner
- Lars Ranthe as Frank: forensic pathologist, coroner, Susanne's sometime lover
- Katrine Greis-Rosenthal as Mia Fønsgaard: fronts Amazing Daisy brothel, drug dealer
- Clara Rosager as Nikki Rasmussen: Christina's wife
- Sandra Hussein as Yasmin: Sebastian's bartender, mole for Slovenians' boss
- Simon Harder as "Register" (English: "Directory") Finn: police HQ Desk Sergeant

=== Season two only ===
- Fanny Leander Bornedal as Anna a.k.a. Sapphire: prostitute-stripper at Sebastian's brothel, witness to fellow prostitute's kidnapping
- Ditte Hansen as Charlotte Lund: Richard's wife, Susanne's friend
- Danica Curcic as Louise: police officer, Susanne's former client, consulted by Sapphire
- Dar Salim as C.C.: former soldier with PTSD, treated by Susanne
- Pernilla August as Maja: psychologist, Susanne's former close friend

=== Season three only ===
- Pilou Asbæk as Markus Lang: William and Elisabeth's son, Holger's younger brother, manages John's missions
- Jakob Oftebro as Rupert Lang: Henrik and Elisabeth's son, Holger's stepbrother, Beatrice's twin brother, aspires to be CEO
- Josephine Park as Beatrice Lang: Holger's stepsister, Rupert's sister and assistant
- Evin Ahmad as Liz: Lang Enterprises' lawyer, represents Holger and Markus
- Lene Maria Christensen as Camilla Lang: hospital-based doctor, Otto's ex-wife then Holger's ex-wife
- Nicolas Bro as Otto: building contractor, Holger's former friend, Karl's father
- Sverrir Guðnason as Viktor Mallström: construction company CEO, Holger's biggest rival
- Solbjørg Højfeldt as Elisabeth Lang: retired Lang Enterprises CEO. Holger, Markus, Rupert and Beatrice's mother, William's widow, Henrik's wife
- Lars Brygmann as Henrik Lang: Elisabeth's second husband, Holger's stepfather, Rupert and Beatrice's father

== Production ==
Face to Face (Forhøret in Danish), was created by Christoffer Boe, who also directed all 24 episodes across three seasons and co-wrote its screenplay. The first season was co-written with Jakob Weis and produced by Jonas Allen and Peter Bose for Viaplay on TV3. It was broadcast from 15 November 2019. According to Boe, he wanted "a crime show with no filler" and one which "cuts quickly to the heart of the matter in each episode." His aim for each was "the interaction and the meeting between two great characters" to be featured. Boe used "the greatest actors we have in Denmark and in Scandinavia" and for each episode "we could do everything in a week". Ullrich Thomsen and his real-life daughter Alma Ekehed Thomsen appear in all eight episodes of that season. It is Alma's debut television acting role. Christian Povlsen of Sound Venue observed, "Even though her character is already dead and gone from the first episode, she still haunts the story through flashbacks and video footage."

== Reception ==
Danish website Sound Venue's Morten Kildebæk rates season one of Face to Face as four-out-of-six stars and praises its concept, "a complete, stylistically delicious and really interesting play with the classic interrogation situation of the crime genre." Kelly Luchtman of Foreign Crime Drama gave it 85% and noticed, the format "is done well, but has some drawbacks... performances are excellent, [but] scenes are very talky". Kildebæk's colleague Povlsen also rated season two at four stars, observing, "Although the tight concept sometimes gets in the way of the drama, the second season[...] is a captivating and well-produced crime novel with a well-spirited [Dyrholm] as the main attraction." The Sydney Morning Herald's Melinda Houston gave the first two seasons four-out-of-five stars and explained, "exquisite psychological thriller[, which] takes the idea Scandi-noir and sends it next level... [it's] incredibly ambitious and wonderfully clever, all in the most unassuming way." Another Sound Venue reviewer, Lars R. Knudsen considered season three, which also got four stars and featured Mikkelsen, who "shows that he is one of the country's best actors, and [Boe] is uncompromising in his concept. Together, this creates a final season that maintains the level that was set back in 2019."

== Episode guide ==
=== Season one ===
.

No. overall	No. in season	Title	Directed by	Written by	Original release date
1	1	"Forensic Medicine" (Rattsmedicin)	Christoffer Boe	Christoffer Boe, Jakob Weis	15 November 2019
Early in the morning, Bjørn attends Jane Doe's corpse at morgue. Frank had already performed autopsy: deems Jane suicided. Bjørn notices Jane's necklace, uncovers her face: it's Christina. Bjørn weeps, Frank phones Richard: need help, here. Bjørn asks Frank for further details; Bjørn locks morgue door. Frank describes Christina's "hesitation wounds" as shallow stabs near her heart before fatal blow penetrated her heart. Frank says he had never met Christina. She was discovered face down, died between 1 and 3 am. Bjørn: there should be a twist wound. Frank: there is; also evidence of drug abuse, bruising to side of face from well before death. Bjørn goes over Frank's autopsy recording, hears Frank noticing twist wound. However, Bjørn disputes suicide conclusion. He orders Frank to open her chest. Richard arrives; prevents Bjørn assaulting Frank. Richard asks Bjørn to leave; inform Susanne. Bjørn kisses Christina goodbye; he takes Frank's report and leaves.
2	2	"The Flat" (Lagenheten)	Christoffer Boe	Christoffer Boe, Jakob Weis	15 November 2019
Blood drips from ceiling. Bjørn ignores Rylander's call, who cautions Bjørn to be careful. Bjørn sees that Christina's Amaliegade luxury apartment is sealed. Bjørn breaks in, searches inside, takes photos; sees bloodstained carpet. Bjørn catches Nikki intruding, orders her to sit. He interrogates her. Nikki shows video: her marrying Christina a year ago. Nikki recalls Christina was drinking too much, they argued and Nikki stayed with a friend, Anna. Bjørn checks with Anna, who confirms Nikki stayed there. Nikki: Christina had many secrets, she was miserable but Nikki do not know why. Initially Nikki claims she does not know how Christina afforded flat. When pressed by Bjørn, Nikki reveals Christina sold herself on darkweb's Blacknet site for "anything goes" prostitution. Nikki drops key, which Bjørn uses on locked door. Inside is Christina's computer server. Bjørn tells Nikki she can have Christina's bitcoins. Nikki: contact Mia, who got Christina onto dark website. Mia runs Amazing Daisy website, which features young girls. When Bjørn searches Nikki's bag, he sees hard drives. Nikki knocks Bjørn out, picks up bag, runs off. As Bjørn revives he sees Christina's vision, who warns him to stop. As Bjørn leaves, server lights switch off.
3	3	"Brothel" (Bordellen)	Christoffer Boe	Christoffer Boe, Jakob Weis	22 November 2019
Bjørn rings the brothel, Amazing Daisy's building's intercom, asks for Mia. Responder claims Mia's not here. When he threatens to return with full police search, door unlocks. Bjørn sees woman, who indicates he sit in lounge area. Bjørn sees Mia's address. Mia denies knowing Christina. Bjørn: Nikki says you do. Mia: hardly knew her. Bjørn demands cup of coffee. Mia claims she was with a client when Christina died, Christina was not prostitute. They shared drugs. Mia: Nikki lied, beat Christina; last week Christina arrived bleeding from her ear. Mia asks Bjørn to leave, but he searches rooms. He discovers Mia's drug stash; asks for her dealer. Mia bought drugs herself in South America. Initially took Christina for a few times. When Susanne phones Bjørn, Mia walks off. Susanne asks Bjørn to visit morgue with her; he sees vision of Christina. Christina undercut Mia's drug trade. Bjørn blackmails Mia into revealing drug lord: Sebastian. Bjørn orders Mia to call Sebastian. Bjørn hands back Mia's drugs. Mia confirms Christina would not suicide. Bjørn leaves, Sebastian phones: gives Bjørn an address to meet.
4	4	"The Nightclub" (Nattklubben)	Christoffer Boe	Christoffer Boe, Jakob Weis	29 November 2019
Refshaleøen: Sebastian approaches; Bjørn calls him Bjark. Sebastian takes Bjørn into nightclub. Sebastian: saw Christina at parties; had no financial arrangement. Sebastian: does not know Blacknet. Bjørn recalls Bjark's corrupt police past. Sebastian scoffs: where's evidence; Christina killed herself. Bjørn: I'll keep digging until I destroy you. Sebastian admits Christina visited yesterday. Sebastian: paid off Bjørn to smuggle cars. Bjørn sold Christina's horse when divorcing Susanne. Sebastian: Christina, Mia arrived at 11 pm. Bjørn: sold horse to slaughterhouse, as Christina no longer wanted horse. Sebastian: question bartender, Yasmin. She's a suspected mole. Sebastian will exchange Yasmin's boss' name for yesterday's CCTV footage. When Yasmin does not reveal her boss, Bjørn places plastic bag over her head. Yasmin admits working for John and Slovenianss. Bjørn informs Sebastian, who will deal with John later. Sebastian shows CCTV footage; Christina left before 1 am, with two men. Sebastian: do not know them; Bjørn coerces Sebastian to explain. Sebastian: Christina created and ran Blacknet. Christina was criminal mastermind. Outside, Bjørn sees Sebastian lied about his cameras. After Sebastian leaves, Bjørn sneaks into the office, views additional footage, recognises man in cap.
5	5	"The Police Car" (Polisbilen)	Christoffer Boe	Christoffer Boe, Jakob Weis	6 December 2019
Bjørn waits for Rylander in police HQ carpark. They embrace; Rylander commiserates with Bjørn. Bjørn drives Rylander, who believes Christina suicided. Rylander: Christina was doing stupid things. Rylander becomes uncomfortable when Bjørn asks where he was yesterday. Rylander recalls how Bjørn lost control of his life, divorced Susanne, and shattered Christina's personality with his selfishness. Rylander had asked Richard to transfer Bjørn to Special Branch. Rylander: Christina became increasingly unsettled; never saw her during last week, except at party last night. Christina was with Mia, they consumed lots of drugs. Rylander drove her, stopped at Nørrebro, where Christina got out. Christina had told Rylander that Bjørn had thrown her out of home. Rylander's current partner Lassen phones: we have meeting. Rylander had claimed Lassen was too ill to work. Rylander denies driving Christina to Amaliegade or blackmailing Christina for Rylander's ludomania. Desk sergeant Finn alibis Rylander: he had stopped DUI after 1 am. Bjørn believes Rylander beat Christina when she would no longer pay his debts. Bjørn drives faster around carpark. Rylander tells Bjørn to look into Holger. Bjørn crashes into parked cars. Rylander's unconscious, Bjørn takes his gun, steals another car.
6	6	"The Trotting Track" (Travbanen)	Christoffer Boe	Christoffer Boe, Jakob Weis	13 December 2019
Bjørn drives to Charlottenlund Racetrack to find Holger. Upstairs Holger speaks to someone, who leaves. Bjørn discovers Holger in kitchen. Holger refuses to talk until Bjørn puts away gun. Holger met Christina at this track when his horses were running. Holger was on way to see Christina last night but arrested for DUI by Rylander and Lassen. Holger introduced Christina to Blacknet, denies killing her. Holger, in stable, shows horse, which he bought for Christina. At first she loved it, but later she turned away. Christina described Bjørn buying her horse and then killing it. Christina was already self-destructive when Holger met her. Holger took over Blacknet from Christina, she wanted out. He gave Nikki her share. Bjørn sees horse is injured. Christina planned to attempt reconciliation with Bjørn. Holger plays Christina's phone message for Bjørn, which cofirms she was alive at 1 am. Holger kills horse. Holger: Christina killed herself, we are both guilty of disappointing her. Bjørn returns to stolen car, considers shooting himself. He gets another call from Susanne.
7	7	"The Barhouse" (Barhuset)	Christoffer Boe	Christoffer Boe, Jakob Weis	20 December 2019
Bjørn asks Richard to remove police. Richard: Rylander in coma; hand in your badge, gun. Bjørn enters hospital's ID room; meets Susanne. Bjørn: hoping to find Christina did not suicide, but he concluded she did. They jointly view Christina's corpse. Susanne kisses Christina goodbye. Bjørn leaves room. Outside he recalls their last day together as family. He cannot remember what went wrong; Susanne cannot deal with his denial. Bjørn had rejected Christina before their separation, when Susanne had cheated on him. Christina longed for Bjørn's approval but he could not provide it. Bjørn butchered Christina's horse after she chose to live with Susanne. Bjørn kisses Christina goodbye; he notices her upper lip's split frenulum. This indicates someone held her mouth closed before killing her. Frank did not mention this in his autopsy report. Susanne reveals she was having sex with Frank when Christina died. Susanne claims she knew of Christina's illegal activities, but could not prevent her. Susanne had asked Rylander to help with Christina. Bjørn: Rylander was blackmailing Christina to pay for his gambling debts. Susanne admits Frank could have met Christina last Christmas.
8	8	"Last Stop" (Sista stoppet)	Christoffer Boe	Christoffer Boe, Jakob Weis	27 December 2019
Bjørn runs along footpath to Frank's home. Bjørn asks Frank about Christina's frenulum. Frank: frenulum could have been damaged by fall. Richard had asked Frank to omit frenulum from report. Richard arrives, he denies telling Frank to make omission in report. Richard was at management conference when Christina died. Bjørn confirms this by finding online photos. Richard receives phone call: Mia's been stabbed in her flat, he leaves. Frank apologises for his affair with Susanne. Bjørn outlines how he believes Frank killed Christina. According to Bjørn: Frank falsified his autopsy report, including time of death, to fit his alibi from Susanne. Last Christmas he had met drunken Christina, who described her lucrative Blacknet website. Frank blackmailed Christina, hired Rylander and Lassen to extort money. When Christina sold Blacknet to Holger, Frank had to get rid of Christina. Richard returns, Bjørn orders him to phone morgue, organise new autopsy on Christina. Richard reaches Tomas, who informs them its too late as Christina's already being cremated. Bjørn sees Frank's smirk and stabs Frank to death. Bjørn's arrested for murder and taken to jail. Vision: Christina thanks Bjørn, it's over now.

=== Season two ===
No. overall	No. in season	Title	Directed by	Written by	Original release date
9	1	"The Private Clinic" (Privatklinikken)	Christoffer Boe	Christoffer Boe, Anna Juul	29 August 2021
Susanne counts 26 days since Christina's death. John arrives for appointment: wants help to stop smoking. John has distinctive birthmark below his left eye. He sees Susanne's wall of photos, featuring Christina. John relates how his stepson Benjamin died recently, which increases his cravings for cigarettes. Susanne and John each smoke John's cigarettes. She suggests using hypnosis; he agrees. Susanne helps John reach his subconscious. John recalls swimming; his mother disliked chlorine smell so she smoked cigarettes. John's hands smell of death, so he smokes. John describes kidnapping women using chloroform, which he distils from boiled chlorine and methane. He has killed numerous women; asks Susanne to stop him. "Sentinent" orders John to kill women. John thrashes, then collapses. Susanne phones Richard to send an officer. When John revives, Susanne claims she was attempting to contact colleague, as John had been unresponsive. However, her colleague did not answer. John cannot remember hypnosis session, starts smoking, again. John pays for appointment and then leaves.
10	2	"The Police Academy" (Politiskolen)	Christoffer Boe	Christoffer Boe, Anna Juul	29 August 2021
Susanne takes taxi to academy; she seeks Richard. Susanne summarises John's descriptions of murdering women. She describes John's birthmark, who claimed he kills for payment by "Sentinent". Richard indicates Susanne's understandable stress over recent events. Richard cannot open investigation without concrete evidence. Nevertheless, he assures Susanne he will look into it. Bjørn in solitary at HQ, for his own protection. Richard: no evidence against Frank; Christina suicided. Richard asks her to declare Bjørn insane due to his behaviour. Richard takes Susanne's statement about John. Susanne believes Richard's hiding something. She recalls Richard having made passes at her, but she had saved Richard's marriage by not informing Charlotte. Richard scoffs, but Charlotte arrives to greet them. Susanne briefly describes meeting John. Richard's called away to address academy students. Susanne describes Charlotte's aloof demeanour since Christina's death. Charlotte apologises: they hug. Charlotte admits undocumented women have gone missing, but police cannot find any connection. Susanne threatens to inform press: Christina was cremated by "mistake", Frank killed in front of Richard, sloppy police work. Richard returns; he elaborates: women disappearing, empty flats, items left behind, no corpses, no tangible evidence. Richard insists on declaring Bjørn insane in exchange for further information. Susanne refuses.
11	3	"The Normal House" (Det normale hus)	Christoffer Boe	Christoffer Boe, Anna Juul	29 August 2021
Susanne enters Louise's yard, overhears her and Max. Louise: no evidence of foul play, witness disappeared, no case. Louise recalls finding distraught woman running. Woman said her friend was killed. Night before, man crashed into friend's flat, took friend away. Witness did not mention birthmark, but ran off before further questioning. Friend was escort; landlord stated she returned home. Louise: eventually realised witness lied. Richard phones Susanne, who does not answer. He then phones Louise, who leaves room to reply. Louise refuses further talking to Susanne. Louise had been betrayed when Susanne interfered in Louise's life while treating her trauma after being raped. Louise accuses Susanne of not abiding by professional boundaries: Susanne meddled in Louise's life because she could not help Christina. Susanne concedes Louise should have reported her rapist, but had not because of Susanne's recommendation. Louise: escorts sold themselves on Blacknet. Susanne: Christina had started Blacknet, but wanted out. Louise: women are killed off when they became difficult or tried stopping. Louise: John was here, scared Max, after case was closed. John has contacts in police. Louise: talk to Bjørn, who knows escort's pimp, Sebastian. Susanne leaves by back door as Louise greets her police partner.
12	4	"The Prison" (Fængslet)	Christoffer Boe	Christoffer Boe, Anna Juul	29 August 2021
Susanne visits Bjørn in prison, ostensibly to evaluate his psychological state. In front of prison officer, Susanne and Bjørn act like strangers. Susanne wants to ask about Sebastian; instead Bjørn justifies killing Frank. After Frank had smirked, Bjørn knew Frank was guilty of covering up Christina's murder. Bjørn: Sebastian's his old police colleague Bjark, he now trafficks undocumented women into prostitution. Bjørn explains how Bjark had historically paid him off to cover up a stolen car operation. Bjørn used that money to buy their home, fund her clinic and purchase horse for Christina. Bjørn reminisces about raising Christina. In order to protect Susanne, Bjørn refuses to tell her more about Christina and Sebastian's Blacknet operations. Susanne: Richard wants you certified insane. Bjørn: describes how Richard must be corrupt, too. Richard must have contacted prison officers to look the other way when Bjørn's attacked by inmates. Susanne: she's already in danger; Richard's after her. Bjørn: get someone to protect you. Bjørn names Sebastian's strip club, Lady Love. Susanne notices more prison officers are watching them. She asks Bjørn to hit her and distract them. Meanwhile, Susanne runs down to basement; someone drives after her.
13	5	"The Strip Club" (Stripklubben)	Christoffer Boe	Christoffer Boe, Anna Juul	29 August 2021
Susanne enters Lady Love, sees strippers dancing. Susanne asks Louise's witness, Sapphire to speak privately; Sapphire treats Susanne as client. Susanne asks about John, Sapphire goes to door, but Susanne blocks it. Sapphire: she pranked Louise, claims her friend, Irene had returned home. Irene stole money, ran off. Sapphire refuses to admit to knowing John. Susanne introduces herself, warns that John's due to kill someone tonight. Sapphire starts caressing Susanne. Sapphire describes previous, unpleasant sexual encounter. Sapphire asks Susanne to relate one of her own. Sapphire attempts to steal Susanne's phone. Susanne admits to having sex with Frank: possibly her daughter's killer. Susanne notices her phone's missing, finds it in Sapphire's bag. Sapphire now admits her friend was Julia. Sapphire took money, framed Julia. Sapphire describes John breaking in, using cloth to cover Julia's mouth before kidnapping her. Sapphire mentions birthmark. Sebastian's unreachable – in Dubai. Susanne recalls Christina starting Blacknet; cautions Sapphire to protect herself. Susanne's vision: Christina adjusts her hair. Susanne sees Sapphire's tattoo, which John had described. Susanne concludes that Sapphire's John's next victim. Susanne argues with Sapphire, who drops her phone, rushes out. On Susanne's way out, shadowed figure shoots; Susanne injures herself when hiding.
14	6	"The Tracker" (Trackeren)	Christoffer Boe	Christoffer Boe, Anna Juul	29 August 2021
Susanne takes taxi to CC's place; climbs over his gate. Susanne to CC: she's been shot at, police cannot be trusted. She apologises for deceiving him when treating him. CC cannot trust Susanne. She briefly explains why she needs CC's help to save Sapphire from John. CC checks Susanne for bugging devices, takes her phone. Susanne hands Sapphire's phone to CC and provides Sapphire's passcode. CC determines Sapphire's in North Harbour via her AirPods. CC questions whether Susanne could shoot John to protect him or Sapphire. Susanne promises: will provide back up. As CC demonstrates how to use his gun, three masked men arrive at his jetty. CC, in speed boat, drives Susanna away. Although hesitant, Susanne learns to fire gun. They disembark at another jetty, walk into building. CC tracks Sapphire's AirPods to auditorium for psychologists conference. They go upstairs, find Sapphire's bag. AirPods are moving outside. They hide when they see police nearby; police call CC to surrender or they will shoot on sight. CC raises his hands, offers to drop gun, but police shoot him, dead. Police van's members collect CC's corpse, van drives off. Susanne continues following AirPods after van leaves.
15	7	"The Train" (Toget)	Christoffer Boe	Christoffer Boe, Anna Juul	29 August 2021
Susanne arrives at train station, sees Maja boarding train; they hug. Maja came from auditorium, but did not see Sapphire. Susanne notices AirPods signal nearby: collects them from Maja. Maja, now admits Sapphire's her client. Maja will not breach confidentiality; she saw Sapphire 30 minutes ago. Sapphire forgot her AirPods, Maja picked them up to return them. Why did she leave Sapphire's bag behind? Susanne does not believe Maja, she points gun at Maja's waist. Susanne demands Maja's phone; finds Richard had phoned her earlier. Maja: Richard asked Maja to counsel Sapphire. Susanne disbelieves Maja's helping or Richard paying to have Sapphire treated. Her story does not reconcile with their self-interested personalities. Maja: you are compensating for Christina's death. Maja claims she had chatted with Christina, who confided in her. Maja tries to convince Susanne to put down her gun. Susanne accuses Maja of reporting confidential information from her clients to Richard and his corrupt police. Susanne describes how Christina was murdered; Richard and Frank covered it up. Did Maja send John to see her? Susanne tries to convince Maja to help save Sapphire from John. Maja: John has boat at North Harbour. Susanne changes trains, returns back.
16	8	"The Secret Place" (Det hemmelige sted)	Christoffer Boe	Christoffer Boe, Anna Juul	29 August 2021
At North Harbour, Susanne sees John carrying bag. Susanne runs towards boat at wharf. Sapphire's sedated, lying on bed. Vision: Christina's groggily responds. John sedates Susanne with chloroform. Susanne wakes on floor, she's restrained. Sapphire's awake, introduces herself as Anna. Susanne recovers her gun, which fell below cupboard. Susanne hides it inside Anna's jacket. John takes them into building, where he ties both into chairs. John prepares drop sheet in front. Susanne realises John had recognised Christina's photo as he murdered her. John recalls hesitation when killing Christina; but continued his job. Susanne: you smell of death. John: Frank hired to frame Christina's death as suicide. Susanne: John made mistake by tearing Christina's frenulum; Frank omitted from report. Susanne: show John his mistake. John cuts Susanne's ties. John re-enacts holding Christina, with Susanne. John recalls making "hesitation wounds". John saw Christina in mirror, hesitated. Susanne: Christina struggled, you grabbed her mouth: tore her lip. Susanne: visited me because you feel guilty. Susanne: I can forgive you. John approaches, Susanne hugs him. Anna's arms break free, recovers gun, but drops it. Susanne picks up gun, fires two shots into John. She frees Anna. They board speedboat, drive away.

=== Season three ===
No. overall	No. in season	Title	Directed by	Written by	Original release date
17	1	"The Restaurant" (Restauranten)	Christoffer Boe	Christoffer Boe, Lasse Kyed Rasmussen	19 February 2023
Holger to henchman, Pete: destroy John's records. Pete: there are videos, including Christina's death. Holger: send video. Holger weeps upon seeing Christina's murder. Holger enters Lang Towers. Holger to Markus: why did John kill Christina? Markus gives no explanation. Holger: Christina was his protégé; who paid for her death? Markus ordered John: follow Christina; as she was scamming Holger. Markus claims: cancelled John's job. Holger, Markus reminisce about past; Elisabeth favoured twins Rupert, Beatrice. Holger wonders about missing American Gold Eagle. Markus suggests erasing video: remember good times. Holger views it again. John places phone on floor, hides behind door, Christina enters. John grabs her with cloth over mouth; starts stabbing. Later, John places corpse near phone. Holger weeps. John says, "It's done". Holger: it was a hit, John was paid; why stage it as suicide? Markus: Christina had enemies. John had told Markus: Christina would takeover company. Holger: John would have killed on Markus' order. Holger realises Markus had help. Markus runs downstairs with Holger chasing. Holger pushes Markus through wooden railing. Markus falls to his death. Holger collects Markus' phone, reads Liz' messages: they planned Christina's death. Holger hides Markus' corpse in storeroom. Ignores CCTV camera on wall.
18	2	"The Apartment" (Lejligheden)	Christoffer Boe	Christoffer Boe, Lasse Kyed Rasmussen	19 February 2023
Holger rushes to Markus' flat, washes bloodied hands, discards clothes. Holger retrieves American Gold Eagle. Holger invites Liz inside. Liz: contract's drawn up. Holger probes for Liz' visit to Markus; he shows her last message. Holger cites Markus' messages, to which Liz replied: call me. Liz: Markus wanted to know whether Christina was threat to Holger. Liz cites saving millions for company. Liz: Blacknet ownership threatens Holger and company's business. Holger: why did Markus perceive Christina as personal threat? Liz: Markus hired investigator to trail Christina. Liz told Markus Christina could fire him. Holger: Christina was murdered; shows video. Holger accuses Liz of inciting Markus to kill Christina. Liz professes her love for Holger: but would never harm Christina. Liz claims she never approached Holger romantically due to power imbalance. Holger: Liz would never miss mother's birthday unless Markus coerced her. Markus promised to recoup Liz' investment losses. Markus wanted help with contract to acquire North Harbour building. Holger: Markus could not draft this contract, who helped him? Holger: Liz would get him to sign contract, trusting it was legit. Liz: Markus received phone call, suddenly answered her questions. Holger uses Markus' CCTV: sees Otto advising Markus. Holger fires Liz.
19	3	"The Construction Site" (Byggepladsen)	Christoffer Boe	Christoffer Boe, Lasse Kyed Rasmussen	26 February 2023
Holger enters North Harbour building site, meets Otto. Holger: Otto encouraged Markus to sign ComTech deal. Otto: current suppliers are unsatisfactory. Markus expected windfall when Holger agreed to ComTech deal. Holger: Otto gains from ComTech contract. Otto: Holger's relationship with Christina made him vulnerable. Holger: someone's trying to topple him. Otto: you always lash out when people disagree with you. They argue over Camilla, Otto punches Holger. Holger meets Otto's worker, Jimmy. Jimmy: ceiling cracks forming; Holger suggests his company will deliver supplies. Holger recites anomalies from current supplier. Holger: seemingly random incidents hide deeper meaning. Holger: someone adjusted measuring labels so incorrect supplies were ordered. Holger to Otto: why deliberately sabotage your building? Holger forces Otto backwards onto wooden railing, demands how much Otto's being paid? Otto admits to sabotage. On behalf of Holger, Otto had helped Christina broker Blacknet drug deal, which went sour. Holger was unavailable; drug dealer beat up Otto's son, Karl. Karl nearly lost his eyesight; he's too fearful to leave home. Otto: follow the money, which leads to Rupert. Holger: you should be scared, Otto. Holger leaves.
20	4	"Lang Towers" (Lang Towers)	Christoffer Boe	Christoffer Boe, Lasse Kyed Rasmussen	26 February 2023
Holger returns to Lang Towers. Beatrice shows investment partners around building. Holger to Rupert: you paid for ComTech's preferential contract; deliberately ruined Otto's construction site. Rupert shows Otto's sexually threatening texts sent to Beatrice. Rupert: confronted Otto, who responded with vandalism. Holger: did your bitterness lead to Christina's murder? Did you order Markus to have her killed? Rupert scoffs, would never align with Markus or Otto: they cannot be trusted. Holger: business is worth 30 billion, you would align with anyone to takeover. Markus blackmailed Rupert, who was organising motion of no confidence against Holger. Beatrice: policeman wants to interview Markus. Rupert to Beatrice: Markus had Christina killed. Holger tells twins: Markus accidentally fell down stairwell. Holger cannot inform police: partners would desert, company would lose millions. Rupert argues against Holger; Beatrice considers Holger's request. Beatrice to Martin: stall policeman. Beatrice to Rupert: erase CCTV footage. Beatrice reveals: knew Holger offered Christina job. Markus could be manipulated if Beatrice made him think he was helping Holger. Beatrice asked Markus to have Christina tailed, but not to kill her. They check Markus' phone: he visited Eiffel Bar recently. Holger leaves, Beatrice goes to met policeman. Outside, Richard awaits Holger.
21	5	"The Pub" (Pubben)	Christoffer Boe	Christoffer Boe, Lasse Kyed Rasmussen	5 March 2023
Holger, Richard head into pub. Holger phones Beatrice: search Markus' car. Holger to Richard: do not know where Markus went, do not know John. Richard: John was murdered; numerous suspects. Richard: Markus, John had long-term phone contacts, meetings. Holger: Markus frequented brothels, gambling dens, often met criminals. Holger denies John was working for him. Beatrice: car's being towed. Richard: Markus' blood soaked wallet was found, towing car for evidence. Richard asks for building's CCTV footage. Holger: argued with Markus about problems with North Harbour building. Richard: you are involved with Rylander, who introduced you to Christina and Blacknet. Bjørn's in prison, Susanne's missing. Holger: your corrupt officers used John for Blacknet assassinations. Holger: you questioned me because your police are corrupt. Richard: Markus' meeting information in exchange for Tower's CCTV. Holger phones Rupert: bringing Richard to view CCTV. Holger sees blood on his watch; dashes into toilet to wash it off. When he returns, Richard arrests Holger. Onscreen, Holger's dragging Markus into storeroom. CCTV operator unable to retrieve stairwell footage. Holger dismisses operator, but cannot find exonerating footage. Richard insists Holger attend police station. Holger knocks down Richard, accesses Richard's phone. Richard received message to visit Viktor. Holger rushes off.
22	6	"The Golf Club" (Golfklubben)	Christoffer Boe	Christoffer Boe, Lasse Kyed Rasmussen	5 March 2023
Holger phones Rupert: police have basement footage; retrieve stairwell footage. Rupert: its erased. Holger boards Viktor's helicopter as police cars arrive. Holger to Viktor: what's deal with Markus. Viktor orders helicopter lift off. Holger: Liz, Otto, Markus have been neutralised. Holger will sue Viktor for criminal interference in businesses. Viktor: Markus was underappreciated; we decided to replace Holger. Viktor claims to have already won; Holger's redundant. Holger: Viktor's vain, presents himself as green, sustainable when he's as rotten as Holger. Holger's collected evidence to besmirch Viktor's image. Holger: talk or will post information online. Helicopter lands at golf course, they enter clubhouse. Viktor owns ComTech, CEC Equity. Viktor had Markus contract ComTech, scared Liz that CEC was bankrupt. When North Harbour building stalls, Holger would be deposed. Holger rechecks Markus' phone: image of Viktor's shoes at Christina's favourite bar. Holger: you met Markus with Christina. Viktor: Christina never showed. Viktor: only want to get rid of Holger, not kill Christina. Viktor sees news report: police hunt Holger for Markus' murder. Viktor admits he loved Markus. Viktor: everyone we approached wants to destroy you; no one loves you because you crush them. Viktor walks off. Police car approaches; Holger steals van.
23	7	"The Kingdom" (Riget)	Christoffer Boe	Christoffer Boe, Lasse Kyed Rasmussen	12 March 2023
Camilla enters Holger's van. She asks: did you kill Markus? Holger: he accidentally fell down stairwell. Holger wants to see Markus' corpse. Camilla, Holger discuss his cold-hearted attitude to all around him. Holger apologises, claims he will surrender to police after viewing Markus. Camilla takes Holger into hospital through rear entrance. Camilla guides Holger past hospital staff, police. Camilla: Markus was afraid of Christina's influence over Holger. Holger: Christina was his successor. They enter corpse storage room, Camilla finds Markus, leaves room. Holger lifts shroud; he weeps, places Gold Eagle in Markus' hands. Holger replaces shroud. Camilla, Holger walk back through hospital. Camilla: Markus accessed one of her patient's files when she left her office. Initially she refused to reveal patient's name. Camilla: Markus read Viktor's file. Viktor had been suicidal, had nervous breakdown when Camilla treated him. Holger recalls: Beatrice told Markus to have Christina tailed, Markus enlisted Liz, Otto into his scheme. Camilla: Elisabeth became interested in company's future, upon learning Christina might take over. Camilla: Elisabeth's not your biological mother; you are adopted. Holger understands why Elisabeth wanted Christina dead. Holger: have to talk to Elisabeth.
24	8	"The Family Mansion" (Familiens Palæ)	Christoffer Boe	Christoffer Boe, Lasse Kyed Rasmussen	12 March 2023
Holger encounters Henrik on mansion's roadway. Henrik: Elisabeth's in forrest; give yourself up to police. Holger yells at Henrik, who leaves. Holger: Elisabeth preferred Rupert, Beatrice because Holger's adopted. Elisabeth: told she could not have children, so they adopted. Later Elisabeth had Markus. Elisabeth shows will: all children have equal share. Elisabeth: William did not want Markus, resented you. Elisabeth met Viktor at Henrik's event, last year. Henrik enters: had to lie to police about Holger. Holger: have to sort out Henrik's plans. Henrik prevented Elisabeth visiting Holger when he was seriously ill. Henrik sent Markus away after Beatrice was lost on boat. Henrik started manipulating Markus when he learnt Holger was planning for Christina to take over. Henrik admits: had Markus have Christina tailed. Holger rails at Henrik for exposing company secrets to Viktor. Henrik: did it to help our children. Elisabeth slaps Henrik, asks him to leave. Henrik shows video, which could exonerate Holger; threatens to erase it. Henrik: send it to police, if Holger resigns in favour of Rupert, Beatrice. Henrik got John's number from Markus; ordered Christina's death. Elisabeth shoots Henrik, dead; hands Henrik's phone to Holger. Holger remembers Christina partying, then dead. Police at mansion.
