= My Eternal Summer =

2024 drama film

- Poster
- Danish: Min evige sommer
- Directed by: Sylvia Le Fanu
- Screenplay by: Sylvia Le Fanu
- Produced by: Jeppe Wowk
- Starring: Kaya Toft Loholt; Maria Rossing; Anders Mossling
- Cinematography: Jan Bastian Muñoz Marthinsen
- Edited by: Emma Lagrelius
- Music by: Patricio Fraile
- Production companies: Adomeit Film; DR
- Distributed by: Reel Pictures
- Release dates: 23 September 2024 (Zinemaldia); 30 January 2025 (Denmark)
- Running time: 105 minutes
- Country: Denmark
- Language: Danish

My Eternal Summer (Danish: Min evige sommer) is a 2024 drama film directed by Sylvia Le Fanu in her directorial debut from a screenplay she wrote with Mads Lind Knudsen. The film stars Kaya Toft Loholt and Maria Rossing.

The film had its world premiere at the 72nd San Sebastián International Film Festival on 23 September 2024.

== Premise ==
A teenager spends her last summer with her dying mother at their family's summer house.

== Cast ==
- Kaya Toft Loholt as Fanny
- Maria Rossing as Karin
- Anders Mossling as Johan

== Production ==
Principal photography took place in Langeland, an island in the south of Denmark.

== Release ==
My Eternal Summer had its world premiere at the 72nd San Sebastián International Film Festival on 23 September 2024, competing for the Kutxabank-New Directors Award. The film also was screened at the 2024 BFI London Film Festival, competing for the Sutherland Trophy.

Prior to its world premiere, TrustNordisk boarded the film's international sales. The film is set to be released in Danish theatres on 30 January 2025.

== Accolades ==
Award / Film Festival	Date of ceremony	Category	Recipient(s)	Result	Ref.
San Sebastián International Film Festival	28 September 2024	Kutxabank-New Directors Award	Sylvia Le Fanu	Nominated	
BFI London Film Festival	20 October 2024	Sutherland Trophy	Sylvia Le Fanu	Nominated	
Robert Awards	31 January 2026	Best Director	Sylvia Le Fanu	Nominated	
Robert Awards	31 January 2026	Best Original Screenplay	Sylvia Le Fanu and Mads Lind Knudsen	Nominated	
Robert Awards	31 January 2026	Best Actor in a Supporting Role	Anders Mossling	Won	
Robert Awards	31 January 2026	Best Actress in a Supporting Role	Maria Rossing	Nominated	
Robert Awards	31 January 2026	Best Editing	Emma Lagrelius	Nominated	
