= Home Sweet Home (2025 Danish film) =

2025 Danish drama film by Frelle Petersen

- Theatrical release poster
- Danish: Hjem kære hjem
- Directed by: Frelle Petersen
- Written by: Frelle Petersen
- Produced by: Jonas Bagger
- Starring: Jette Søndergaard
- Cinematography: Jørgen Johansson
- Edited by: Frelle Petersen
- Music by: Flemming Berg
- Production company: Zentropa
- Release date: 14 February 2025 (Berlinale)
- Running time: 112 minutes
- Country: Denmark
- Language: Danish

Home Sweet Home (Danish: Hjem kære hjem) is a 2025 Danish drama film written, edited, and directed by Frelle Petersen. It is the final installment in Petersen's trilogy about his hometown, Southern Jutland, following Uncle (2019) and Forever (2022). It stars Jette Søndergaard as Sofie, a single mother.

It had its world premiere at the 75th Berlin International Film Festival on 14 February 2025. It received five nominations at the 43rd Robert Awards, including Best Danish Film.

== Premise ==
A single mother starts a new job as a home care worker while managing everyday life with her daughter.

== Cast ==
- Jette Søndergaard as Sofie
- Karen Tygesen as Else
- Mimi Bræmer Dueholm as Clara
- Hanne Knudsen as Katrine
- Finn Nissen as Jarl

== Production ==
As research for the film, Frelle Petersen worked as a home care worker and drove around Southern Jutland to care for elderly citizens. In August 2024, it was reported that TrustNordisk acquired the film's international sales. The project was presented at the 30th New Nordic Films, held during the Norwegian International Film Festival. It received €45,000 development grant from the European Union.

== Release ==
Home Sweet Home had its world premiere at the Panorama section at the 75th Berlin International Film Festival on 14 February 2025.

It was released on 19 June 2025 in Danish theatres by Nordisk Film.

== Accolades ==
Award / Film Festival	Date of ceremony	Category	Recipient(s)	Result	Ref.
Berlin International Film Festival	22 February 2025	Panorama Audience Award	Frelle Petersen	3rd Place	
Robert Awards	31 January 2026	Best Danish Film	Jonas Bagger and Frelle Petersen	Nominated	
Robert Awards	31 January 2026	Best Original Screenplay	Frelle Petersen	Nominated	
Robert Awards	31 January 2026	Best Actress in a Leading Role	Jette Søndergaard	Nominated	
Robert Awards	31 January 2026	Best Editing	Frelle Petersen	Nominated	
Robert Awards	31 January 2026	Best Sound Design	Hans Møller	Nominated	
