= Allegro (film) =

- Theatrical poster
- Directed by: Christoffer Boe
- Written by: Christoffer Boe; Mikael Wulff
- Produced by: Tine Grew Pfeiffer
- Starring: Ulrich Thomsen; Helena Christensen; Henning Moritzen
- Cinematography: Manuel Alberto Claro
- Edited by: Peter Brandt
- Music by: Thomas Knak
- Production company: AlphaVille Pictures Copenhagen
- Release date: 30 September 2005
- Running time: 88 minutes
- Country: Denmark
- Language: Danish

Allegro is a 2005 Danish film directed by Christoffer Boe. Together with Mikael Wulff, Christoffer Boe also wrote the screenplay for this film. It is Christoffer Boe's second film as a director. It features Ulrich Thomsen and former model Helena Christensen.

== Plot ==
Zetterstrøm (Ulrich Thomsen) once had a love affair with a woman (Helena Christensen). In favour of his musical career, Zetterstrøm left her and forgot his past. While he is away from Copenhagen, a supernatural incident occurs, making the central part of Copenhagen inaccessible. Over time it becomes impossible to enter the area due to some invisible shield. When Zetterstrøm returns to Copenhagen, he is oblivious to this incident and is guided by a mysterious man (Henning Moritzen) into the zone. Inside the zone, Zetterstrøm must re-experience his unresolved and traumatic love affair.

== Cast ==
- Zetterstrøm -- Ulrich Thomsen
- Andrea -- Helena Christensen
- Tom -- Henning Moritzen
- Alex in the Zone -- Nikolaj Lie Kaas
- Morten -- Jon Lange
- Terence Sander -- Nicolas Bro

== Production ==
The film was shot in Copenhagen, Denmark and in Manhattan, New York, United States.

== Soundtrack ==
1. Concerto for Piano and Orchestra No. 5, BWV 1056 in F minor – II. Largo (3:00)
2. Concerto for Piano and Orchestra No. 1, BWV 1052 in D minor – I. Allegro (7:45)
3. Concerto for Piano and Orchestra No. 3, BWV 1054 in D major – II. Adagio e piano sempre (6:09)
4. Concerto No. 3, BWV 974 (after Alessandro Marcello's Oboe Concerto, Op. 1, in D minor) – II. Adagio (5:03)
5. Goldberg Variations, BWV 988 – Aria (3:07)
6. The Well-Tempered Clavier, Book 1, BWV 846 – Prelude No. 1 in C major (2:00)
7. The Well-Tempered Clavier, Book 1, BWV 847 – Prelude No. 2 in C minor (1:30)
8. The Well-Tempered Clavier, Book 1, BWV 848 – Prelude No. 3 in C-sharp major (1:14)
9. The Well-Tempered Clavier, Book 1, BWV 853 – Fugue No. 8 in D-sharp minor (5:52)
10. The Well-Tempered Clavier, Book 1, BWV 865 – Prelude No. 20 in A minor (0:56)
11. Invention No. 1, BWV 772 in C major (1:18)
12. Invention No. 6, BWV 777 in E major (2:36)
13. Invention No. 8, BWV 779 in F major (0:51)
14. Sinfonia No. 5, BWV 791 in E-flat major (2:22)
15. Gnomenreigen (Dance of the Gnomes)

All the music by Johann Sebastian Bach, except "Gnomenreigen" by Franz Liszt. Complementary music by Anders Remers and Morten Green.
