= Nicolas Bro =

Danish actor (born 1972)

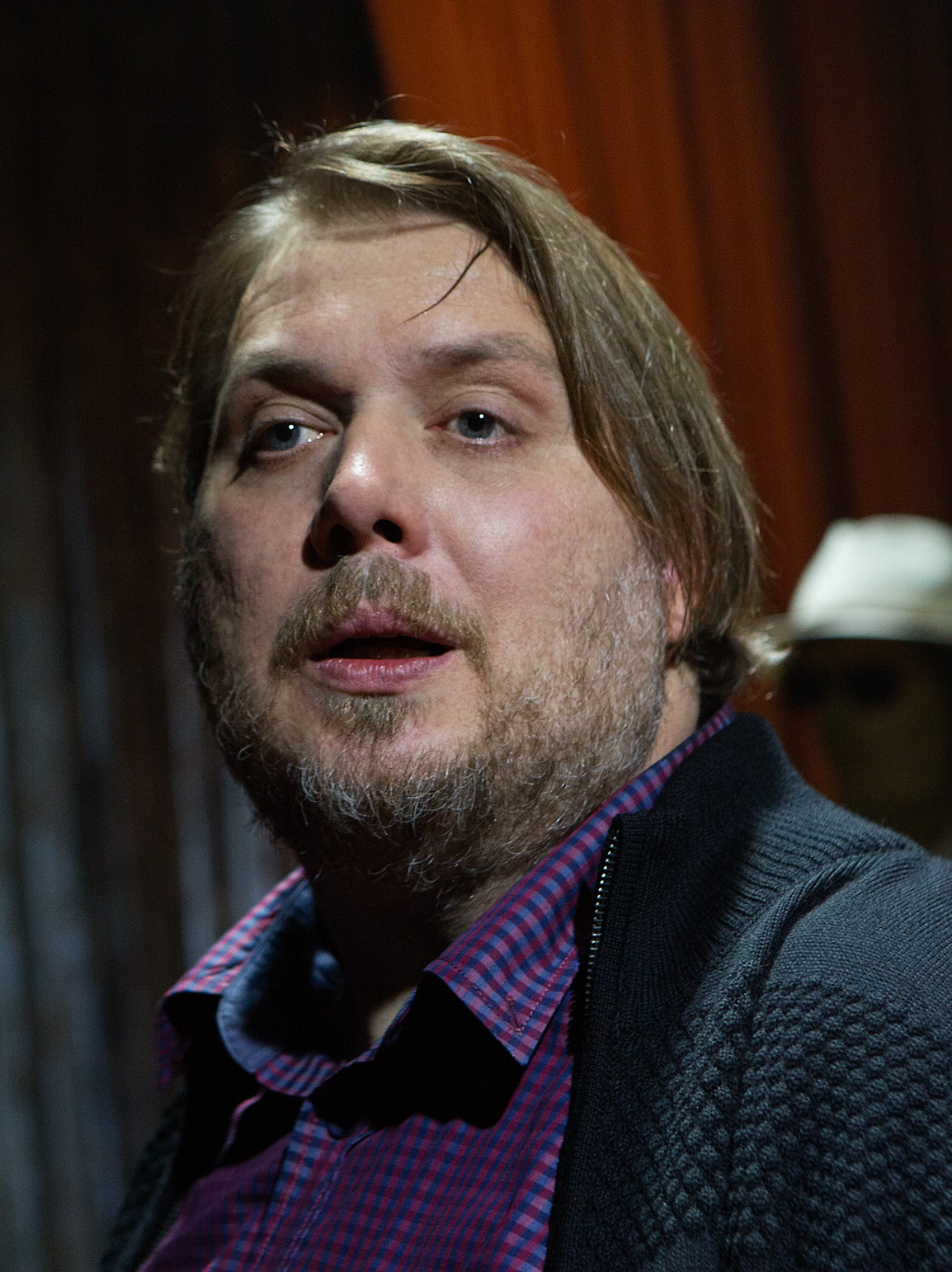
- Bro in 2016
- Born: 16 March 1972 (age 54); Copenhagen, Denmark

Nicolas Bro (born 16 March 1972) is a Danish actor of stage and screen, and a playwright. He played a German soldier in Steven Spielberg's 2011 film War Horse. On television, he is known for his role as Thomas Buch in the TV series The Killing (2009), as Ditlev Gothardt Monrad in 1864 (2014), and as Freddie in The Bridge (2015). He appears as Folke in the 2025 Netflix series The Asset.

== Early life and education ==
Nicolas Bro was born in Copenhagen, Denmark, on 16 March 1972. He grew up in a family of actors; his mother is Danish actress Helle Hertz and father is the actor Christoffer Bro. His sister Laura Bro and brother Anders Peter Bro are both actors.

He attended the Danish National School of Performing Arts (Statens Teaterskole) from 1994, graduating in 1998.

== Career ==
=== Stage ===
Bro gave his debut performance while still a student, in the play Slottet ("The Castle") at Mammut Theatre in 1994, and his first play as a playwright, Natsværmer ("Night Swarms"). Since 2000 he has been employed by the Royal Danish Theatre, appearing in many plays there as well as giving performances in other independent theatre.

=== Screen ===
Bro appeared the film 2006 film Offscreen, directed by Christoffer Boe, as himself. In 2011, he became known internationally when he played the German Private Friedrich, in Steven Spielberg's War Horse.

On television, he appeared in a supporting role as Justice Minister Thomas Buch in series 2 of the hit Danish TV crime drama The Killing in 2009, and as Council President D. G. Monrad in the Danish TV period drama 1864 in 2014. He also appeared as Freddie Holst in season 3 of Swedish-Danish series The Bridge in 2015.

He played Otto in the TV3 crime drama series Face to Face (Forhøret), from 2019 to 2023.

In 2025, he appears as Folke in the Netflix series The Asset (Legenden).

== Awards ==
=== Stage ===
In 1999, Bro was awarded the Reumert Talent Prize, in April 2002 received a Reumert Award for best supporting role in Ole Bornedal's Skrigerne at the Aveny Theatre.

He won the 2007 Reumert Prize Award for male leading actor for his performance as Mephisto in Goethe's Faust at the Royal Danish Theatre, and the following year was again awarded the same prize, for his role as Hamlet in the newly-opened Royal Danish Playhouse.

=== Screen ===
In 2007, Bro was awarded a Bodil Award for Best Actor in a Leading Role for his performance in Offscreen.

In 2005 he was awarded the Natsvaerme Award for young Danish talent at the Copenhagen NatFilm Festival.

== Personal life ==
In 1995 he married prop designer and director Theresa Stougaard Bro (née Petersen).

== Filmography ==
Bro has acted in many films and TV series, including:

=== Film ===
- Election Night (1998, short) – man
- The Art of Success (1999, short) – Eddie
- Kira's Reason: A Love Story (2001) – Tattoo Mogens
- Monas Verden (2001) – film editor
- Kira's Reason: A Love Story (2001) – John
- The Performance (2002)
- Minor Mishaps (2002) – hospital porter
- The Dog's Called Fiat 128 (informal English title), Old, New, Borrowed and Blue (USA title) (2003) – Sales Clerk
- The Green Butchers (2003) – Hus Hans
- Stealing Rembrandt (2003) – Jimmy
- Reconstruction (2003) – Leo Sand
- Bokseren (2003)
- Baby (2003) – Spritter
- Rule No. 1 (2003) – Palle
- The Good Cop (2004) – Mulle
- King's Game (2004) – Henrik Moll
- We Are the Champions (2005) – Asger
- Adam's Apples (2005) – Gunnar
- Dark Horse (2005) – Morfar
- Murk (2005) – Anker
- Allegro (2005) – Terence Sander
- Uro (2006) – Dansken
- Skymaster: A Flying Family Fairytale (2006) – Alf
- Restless (2006)
- Offscreen (2006) – himself
- The Black Madonna (2007) – Brian
- Outside Love (2007) – Weinberger
- White Night (2007) – Bertel Nymann
- Soi Cowboy (2008) – Tobias Christiansen
- The Good Heart (2009) – Ib Dolby
- At World's End (2009) – Mikael Feldt
- Brotherhood (2009) – Tykke
- Over gaden under vandet (2009) – Ask
- Everything will be Fine (2010) – Håkon
- Smukke mennesker (2010) – doctor
- Sandheden om mænd (2010) – Ulle
- Jensen & Jensen (2011) – Bjarne Jensen (voice)
- Beast (2011) – Bruno
- War Horse (2011) – Friedrich
- Undskyld jeg forstyrrer (2012) – Allan
- Fuglejagten (2012) – Morten
- Talenttyven (2012) – Aslan
- Spies & Glistrup (2013) – Mogens Glistrup
- Antboy (2013) – Dr. Albert Gæmmelkra / The Flea
- Sorrow and Joy (2013) – Birkemose
- Nymphomaniac (2013) – F
- Antboy: Revenge of the Red Fury (2014) – Dr. Albert Gæmmelkra / The Flea
- Men & Chicken (2015)
- Mennesker bliver spist (2015) – Holger
- Antboy 3 (2015) – Dr. Albert Gæmmelkra / The Flea
- Fuglene over sundet (2016) – Kaj
- Dræberne fra Nibe (2017) – Ib
- Ljusningen (2017) – Nibler
- Aldrig mere i morgen (2017) – Sønnen Vincent
- Atak paniki (2017) – Oskar
- Fantasten (2017) – Hasse
- Mens vi lever (2017) – Peter Ilsøe
- The Purity of Vengeance (2018) – Brandt
- Skammerens datter II: Slangens gave (2019) – Sarkan
- Domino (2019) – Hospital Porter
- Gooseboy (2019) – Viggo Mortensen
- Collision (2019 film) (2019) – Wagner
- Riders of Justice (2020) – Emmenthaler
- The Middle Man (2021) – The Pastor
- A Taste of Hunger (2021) – Torben

=== TV ===
- The Killing (2009) – Thomas Buch
- Mammon (2014) – Arkitekten
- 1864 (2014) – Ditlev Gothardt Monrad
- The Bridge (2015) – Freddie
- Troldspejlet & Co (2019)
- DNA (2019) – Jarl Skaubo
- The Kingdom (2022) - Balder
- Face to Face (2023) – Otto
- The Asset (2025; Legenden) - Folke
