= AlphaVille Pictures Copenhagen =

Danish film production company

- Industry: Film
- Founded: 2003
- Founders: Christoffer Boe, Tine Grew Pfeiffer
- Fate: Active
- Headquarters: Copenhagen, Denmark

AlphaVille Pictures Copenhagen is a film production company based in Copenhagen, Denmark. It was founded by director Christoffer Boe and producer Tine Grew Pfeiffer in 2003, following Boe's debut feature film, Reconstruction, which was produced by Pfeiffer, at that time working for Nordisk Film. Since then, the company has mainly released Boe's subsequent films. The company is named after the 1965 Jean-Luc Godard film Alphaville. Their first release was the feature film Allegro, directed by Boe and co-written by Boe and Mikael Wulf.

== Selected films ==
- Allegro (2005)
- Offscreen (2006)
- Out of Love (2009)
- Everything Will be Fine (2010)
- Sex, Drugs & Taxation (2013)
- When Animals Dream (2014)
