= The Lost Treasure of the Knights Templar =

- Directed by: Kasper Barfoed
- Written by: Søren Frellesen; Philip LaZebnik
- Produced by: Mie Andreasen; Tivi Magnusson
- Starring: Julie Grundtvig Wester; Christian Heldbo Wienberg; Nicklas Svale Andersen; Frederikke Thomassen
- Cinematography: Jan Richter-Friis
- Music by: Jeppe Kaas
- Release date: February 3, 2006
- Running time: 85 minutes
- Country: Denmark
- Language: Danish

The Lost Treasure of the Knights Templar (Danish: Tempelriddernes skat) is a 2006 Danish film based on books by the Danish author Erling Haagensen (see "The Templars' Secret Island").

== Cast ==
- Julie Grundtvig Wester as Katrine
- Christian Heldbo Wienberg as Nis
- Nicklas Svale Andersen as Mathias
- Frederikke Thomassen as Fie
- Peter Gantzler as Christian
- Ulf Pilgaard as Johannes
- Kurt Ravn as Erik Isaksen
- Birgitte Simonsen as Anette
- Bent Conradi as Graver
- Søren Steen as Postman
