= Offscreen (film) =

- Theatrical release poster
- Directed by: Christoffer Boe
- Written by: Christoffer Boe; Knud Romer Jørgensen
- Produced by: Tine Grew Pfeiffer
- Starring: Nicolas Bro; Lene Maria Christensen; Christoffer Boe
- Cinematography: Nicolas Bro
- Edited by: Peter Brandt
- Production company: AlphaVille Pictures Copenhagen
- Release date: 18 August 2006
- Running time: 93 minutes
- Country: Denmark
- Language: Danish

Offscreen is a 2006 Danish film directed by Christoffer Boe, who also wrote the screenplay together with Knud Romer Jørgensen. With an odd mixture of fiction and reality, it tells the peculiar story of a man who films himself for a whole year in a quest for invisibility. When he is inevitably caught on camera, however, he takes his own life, causing the movie to take on the fictional aspect of a documentary. When combined with the plight of the homeless, the film can also be a meditation on the difficulties of facing the stranger.

== Cast ==
- Nicolas Bro -- Nicolas Bro
- Lene Maria Christensen -- Lene Maria Christensen
- Christoffer Boe -- Christoffer Boe
- Lene's Mother -- Karen Margrethe Bjerre
- Lene's Father -- Niels Weyde
- Jakob Cedergren -- Jakob Cedergren
- Assistant Editor -- Bjarke de Koning

== Awards ==
- 2006 Altre Visioni Award at the 63rd Venice International Film Festival for Offscreen
- 2006 win at The Nordic Council Film Prize for Offscreen
