= Kasper Barfoed =

Danish film director

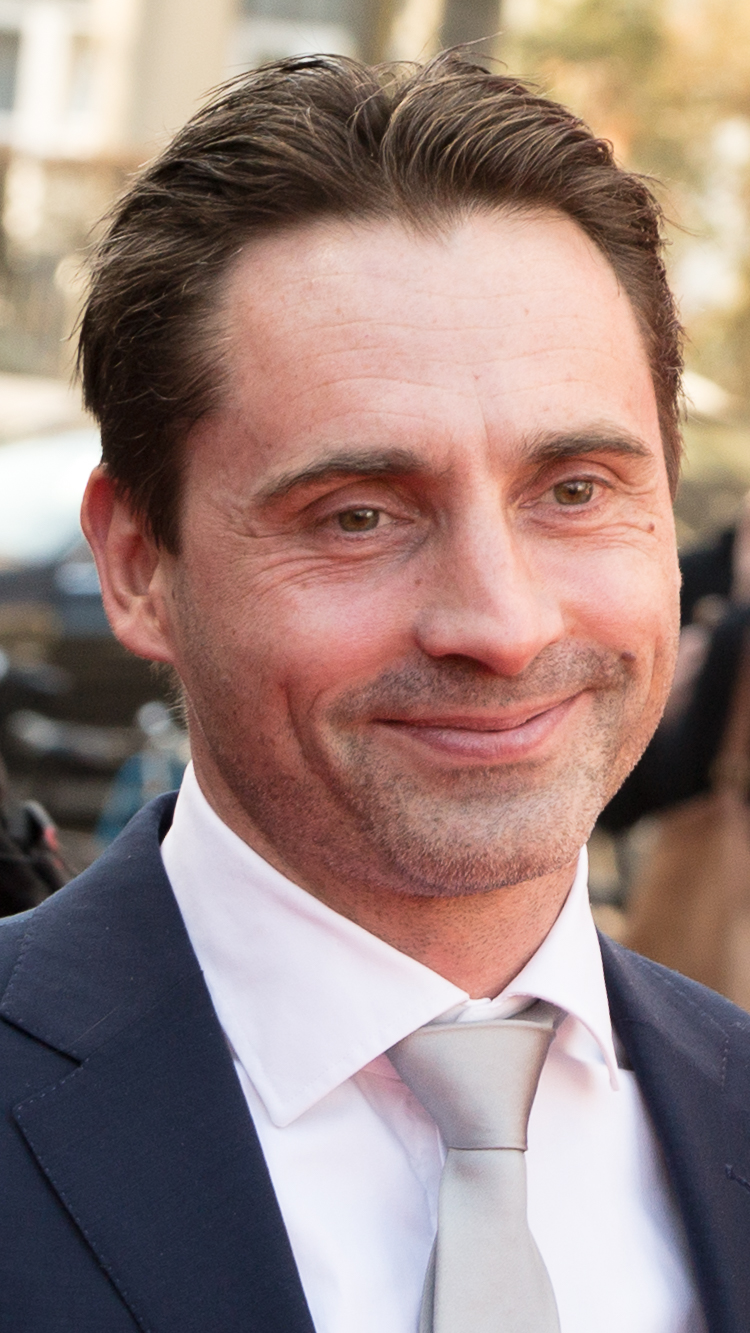
- Film: 6
- Television show: 8

Kasper Barfoed (born 1972) is a Danish film director.

Barfoed was born in 1972, in Copenhagen, Denmark. He has a bachelor's degree in comparative literature from the University of Copenhagen.

== Selected filmography (as director) ==
- The Lost Treasure of the Knights Templar (2006)
- The Candidate (2008)
- The Numbers Station (2013)
- Sommeren '92 (2015)
- Below the Surface (2017)

== Selected television ==
- Those Who Kill (2011)
- Trom (TV series) (2022), director
- The Asset (TV series) (2025)
