= Sauna (2025 film) =

2025 film directed by Mathias Broe

- Directed by: Mathias Broe
- Written by: William Lippert
- Based on: Sauna by Mads Ananda Lodahl
- Produced by: Mads-August Hertz
- Starring: Magnus Juhl Andersen; Nina Rask
- Cinematography: Nicolai Lok
- Edited by: Linda Man
- Music by: Emil Davidsen
- Production company: Nordisk Film Production
- Distributed by: TrustNordisk
- Release date: 27 January 2025 (Sundance)
- Running time: 105 minutes
- Country: Denmark
- Languages: Danish; Swedish

Sauna is a Danish romantic drama film, directed by Mathias Broe and released in 2025. Adapted from the novel of the same name by Mads Ananda Lodahl, the film stars Magnus Juhl Andersen as Johan, a gay man living in Copenhagen who freely engages in casual sex at the gay sauna where he works, but unexpectedly finds a deeper romantic connection when he meets William (Nina Rask), a trans man.

The cast also includes Dilan Amin, Klaus Tange, Peter Oliver Hansen, Morten Burian, Billie N. Hviid Andersen, Theo Suissa, Anton Hjejle, Fuad Gumas, Sam Koosha, Niels Munk Plum, Christian Gade Bjerrum, Kenneth Cockwhore and Daniel Muniz in supporting roles.

The film premiered on 27 January 2025 at the 2025 Sundance Film Festival.

== Critical response ==
On the review aggregator website Rotten Tomatoes, 88% of 17 critics' reviews are positive.

David Opie of IndieWire rated the film B+, writing that "Broe’s script (co-written with William Lippert) adeptly navigates a rounded trans story arc that encompasses both the positive and the negative without leaning too hard on one or the other. These ups and downs are threaded throughout the central relationship this film is hinged on as their feelings ebb and flow with each new development. The chemistry between the two leads feels grounded in something real, whether they’re tentatively exploring each other’s worlds or blowing up their joint world through outbursts, and even worse, indifference."

For Ioncinema, Nicholas Bell wrote that "Broe, along with screenwriters William Lippert and Mads Ananda Lodahl, provide few details about Johan, who, prior to being a small-town boy with a contentious relationship with his parents, moved to Copenhagen only to experience the eternal yoke of isolation in an urban center. We do receive a meaningful conversation about Johan’s first sexual crush, and a formative orgasm which was powerful enough to make him contemplate his relationship to the universe. It’s clear William may be the first human evoking a similar formative relationship for Johan, but both are blinded by the temporary physical solace they are able to provide one another as actual evidence of their fulfillment. Johan’s adolescent orgasm is later visualized powerfully during a moment of drunken despair, signifying how their fast track romance has fizzled on a psychic level."

For Cineuropa, Olivia Popp wrote that "Johan loves William 'as he is' – so why can’t William love himself, even if he doesn’t have immediate access to hormones or surgery? Broe makes clear what cisgender people thus take for granted: it’s just not that simple. And so, Sauna’s central romance becomes caught between a trans person’s need to live as they are and his partner’s desire to express love – two acts that shouldn’t necessarily be in conflict but end up clashing because of the system in which they live. However, the movie still closes with a satisfyingly defiant spark of hope. It's up to the audience to decide whether it's misguided, a show of true love or both."
