= Reconstruction (2003 film) =

2003 Danish film

- Directed by: Christoffer Boe
- Written by: Christoffer Boe; Mogens Rukov
- Produced by: Tine Grew Pfeiffer
- Starring: Nikolaj Lie Kaas; Maria Bonnevie; Krister Henriksson; Nicolas Bro
- Cinematography: Manuel Alberto Claro
- Edited by: Mikkel E. G. Nielsen
- Music by: Thomas Knack
- Production company: Nordisk Film
- Release date: 26 September 2003
- Running time: 91 minutes
- Country: Denmark
- Languages: Danish; Swedish

Reconstruction is a 2003 Danish psychological romantic drama film and the debut of Christoffer Boe, who also wrote the screenplay together with Mogens Rukov. It was filmed in Copenhagen, and won the Camera D’Or at the Cannes Film Festival in 2003 Golden Plaque for Manuel Alberto Claros luminous wide-screen cinematography.

== Plot ==
The central character is Alex (Nikolaj Lie Kaas), a Danish photographer with a Stockholm-bred girlfriend, Simone (Maria Bonnevie).

Late one evening Alex suddenly abandons his girlfriend, Simone, to pursue the beautiful Aimee, played also by Maria Bonnevie. In his encounter with Aimee time and place dissolve for him and he becomes a stranger to Simone, to whom he cannot return.

"It’s all a film. It’s all a construction", announces the narrator, who is soon revealed to be a noted Swedish author, August (Krister Henriksson), as well as the tale's apparent inventor.

== Shooting ==
The film was shot almost entirely in available light. The crew shot Super 16 on an Arri SR3 using three different stocks. Then the film was scanned, color-graded, and digitally masked to CinemaScope. The scan was a simple one-light, and the team did no color correction, the opposite of today's trend to perform a digital intermediate. They also pushed the emulsion for extra grain.

== Cast ==
- Alex David -- Nikolaj Lie Kaas
- Simone, Aimee -- Maria Bonnevie
- Leo Sand -- Nicolas Bro
- Monica -- Ida Dwinger
- Nan Sand -- Helle Fagralid
- Journalist -- Isabella Miehe-Renard
- Fru Banum (Mrs. Banum) -- Malene Schwartz
- Mel David -- Peter Steen
- Tryllekunstner -- Klaus Mulbjerg
- August Holm -- Krister Henriksson
- Mercedes Sand -- Mercedes Claro Schelin
- Waiter -- Jens Blegaa
- Bartender -- Katrin Muth
- Bartender -- David Dencik

== Soundtrack ==
- Samuel Barber – "Adagio for Strings"
- Fred Astaire – "Night & Day"
- Charles Paul Wilp – "Madison Avenue Perfume Ad"
- Schubert – Piano Sonata in B flat major, D960 (II. Andante sostenuto)
