= The Madman's Garden =

Opera by Sunleif Rasmussen

The Madman's Garden (Í Ódamansgardi)
- Chamber opera in three acts by Sunleif Rasmussen
- Librettist: Dánial Hoydal
- Language: Faroese
- Premiere: 12 October 2006; Haus des Nordens, Tórshavn, Faroe Islands

The Madman's Garden (Í Ódamansgardi) is a Faroese chamber opera in three acts by Sunleif Rasmussen with a libretto by Dánial Hoydal, based on a short story by William Heinesen (1960). It is the first opera in Faroese.

== Plot ==
The scenario takes place in the Faroe Islands and is based on a story by William Heinesen, which was published in Danish in 1960 under the title Den gale mands have (The Madman's Garden). The story tells of a boy and a girl – Marselius and Stella Kristina – who meet in the garden of a "madman" named Jordanson. He is a mostly inactive character, but everything revolves around him: Is he crazy? What is his story? Does he possess supernatural powers? Does he even exist? In trying to get to the bottom of these questions, the couple grows closer and defines themselves.

=== Characters ===
- Marselius, boy from 11 (at the beginning) to 17 years old (at the end), a dreamer (actor)
- Stella Kristina, girl from 12 to 18 years old, simultaneously pretty and ugly, simultaneously insecure and a femme fatale (actress)
- Jordanson, the Madman (bass/actor)
- Man, Marselius' abstract alter ego (Tenor)
- Woman, Stella Kristina's abstract alter ego (Soprano)

== Composition ==
Í Óðamansgarði is a chamber opera for 15 musicians, two actors, three singers, and two dancers. The actors do not sing, but this task is taken on by a soprano and a tenor, who represent the alter egos of the two. The singers do not have arias, but instead sing individual words or phrases. In the first production by dramaturge Eyðun Johannessen, all three singers were not Faroese, but came from Åland, Iceland, and Denmark. Nevertheless, they sang in Faroese.

== History ==
The opera was commissioned in 2001 by the Faroese chamber ensemble Aldubáran under the direction of Icelandic conductor Bernharður Wilkinson, and was a co-production of the Haus des Nordens and the National Theatre of the Faroe Islands. In the history of the Faroe Islands, this production holds a special place. Never before had an opera been written specifically for the island people of nearly 50,000. The opera was first performed in the Faroe Islands. Even before its premiere, houses in Sweden, Denmark, Iceland, and Wales showed interest. A DVD production and a translation of the libretto into five languages are also planned. The English translation is already available online.
