= Christoffer Boe =

Danish film director and screenwriter

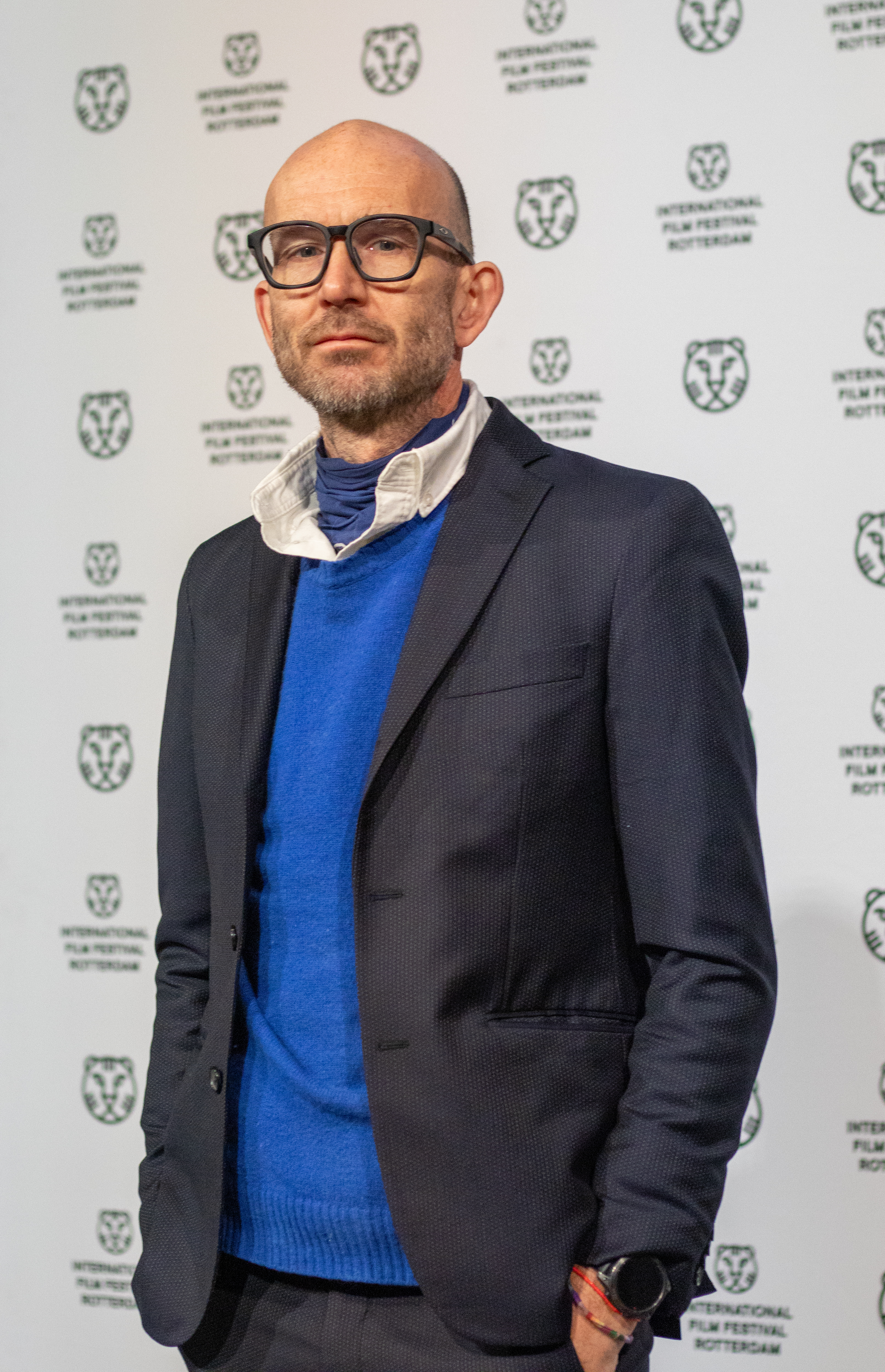
- Boe at the IFFR 2026
- Born: 7 May 1974 (age 51); Rungsted Kyst, Denmark
- Other names: Christoffer Boes
- Awards: Golden Camera at Cannes Film Festival; 2003 Reconstruction; FIPRESCI Director of the Year at San Sebastián International Film Festival; 2003 Reconstruction; Grand Prix at Sofia International Film Festival; 2004 Reconstruction; Young Cinema Award at Venice Film Festival; 2006 Offscreen

Christoffer Boe (born 1974) is a Danish film director and screenwriter. His awards include the FIPRESCI Director of the Year at San Sebastián International Film Festival and the Golden Camera at Cannes Film Festival in 2003. He is also co-founder and director of the film production company AlphaVille Pictures Copenhagen.

== Early life and education ==
Boe was born in Rungsted just north of Copenhagen, Denmark. After school in Denmark, he went to study the history of cinematography in Indiana University in Bloomington, United States. Then, he continued his studies in Copenhagen University. In 1997 he decided to go deep into movie making and was accepted at the National Film School of Denmark director's course. There, Boe developed a style of movie making and playing with narrative structure.

During that time, he directed a trilogy of short films: Obsession (1999), Virginity (2000) and Anxiety (2001). They were 20 to 30 minutes long and starred Maria Bonnevie and Nikolaj Lie Kaas. They're all basically about a young male being obsessed by a beautiful woman and then being trapped in his own logic of what love is. "Anxiety" received the Prix Decouverte de la Critique Francais and was screened in Critic's Week in 2002.

He graduated from the National Film School of Denmark in 2001.

== Career ==
In 2001, he made 6 episodes (each 10 minutes) of TV series Kissmeyer Basics.

In 2004, he shot a short film Europe Does Not Exist as part of Visions of Europe with Cecilie Thomsen and Henning Moritzen representing Denmark in this European Union media project.

His fourth feature film– the thriller Everything will be Fine was selected for Quinzaine des Réalisateurs (Directors' Fortnight), marking the third Danish film to be selected for 2010 Cannes International Film Festival.

== Hr. Boe & Co. ==
After graduating from film school, Boe became the head of the Hr. Boe & Co. consisting of a group of filmmakers who gathered together because of a mutual adoration for the perfect frame while studying at the National Film School of Denmark. In spite of the fact that their debut (Anxiety in 2001) occurred while studying for final exams, their first feature film Reconstruction was released in 2003 and was the team's first actual collaborative work. Boe was so satisfied with Maria Bonnevie and Nikolaj Lie Kaas playing in his students shorts – so he wrote Reconstruction specifically with them in mind.

The other basic members are:

- Tine Grew Pfeiffer (film producer)
- Manuel Alberto Claro (director of photography)
- Mikkel E.G. Nielsen (film editor)
- Morten Green (sound designer)

== Trivia ==
- His production company is named after the film Alphaville and he is an atheist.
- Christoffer about Lars Von Trier: "I think there are ten or twenty guys like him, who you just have to look at. He is one of those. I find his position as a very confrontational and controversial man kind of funny. To me he's not controversial figure, he's just a very interesting film maker".

== Filmography ==
=== Short films (student works) ===
- Obsession (1999)
- Virginity (2000)
- Anxiety (2001)

=== Feature films ===
- Reconstruction (2003)
- Allegro (2005)
- Offscreen (2006)
- Everything will be Fine (2010)
- Beast (2010)
- Sex, Drugs & Taxation (2013)
- A Taste of Hunger (2021)

=== Other ===
- Kissmeyer Basic (2001 TV series)
- Visions of Europe (2004, segment "Europe Does Not Exist")
- Face to Face or Forhøret (2019, 2021, 2023 TV series)

== Awards ==
- 2003 San Sebastián Film Festival FIPRESCI Director of the Year
- 2003 Caméra d'Or for Reconstruction
- 2006 Young Cinema Award at the Venice Film Festival for Offscreen
- 2006 Altre Visioni Award at the 63rd Venice International Film Festival for Offscreen
- 2006 win at The Nordic Council Film Prize for Offscreen
- 2012 Dauphin d'Or at Cannes Corporate Media & TV Awards for "We are Maersk"
- 2015 Dauphin d'Argent at Cannes Corporate Media & TV Awards for "Danfoss Engineering Tomorrow"

== Quotes on filmmaking ==
- "I liked movies so much that they became an obsession. I am still trying to kick the habit."
- "Making it good, which is tougher than one might think. Creating rules and an inner logic in a cinematic world where everything is possible is not easy. Or maybe it is, but it wasn't for me."
