= Trom (TV series) =

Faroese TV mystery drama series

- Genre: Mystery; Thriller; Nordic noir
- Developed by: Torfinnur Jákupsson
- Written by: Torfinnur Jákupsson; Donna Sharpe
- Directed by: Peter Ahlén; Kasper Barfoed; Davíd Óskar Ólafsson
- Starring: Ulrich Thomsen; Maria Rich; Olaf Johannessen; Mariann Hansen; Helena Heðinsdóttir
- Composer: Ólavur Jákupsson
- Countries of origin: Faroe Islands; Denmark; Iceland; Germany
- Original languages: Faroese; English; Danish
- No. of seasons: 1
- No. of episodes: 6

Production
- Producers: Jón Hammer; Rikke Ennis
- Production locations: Torshavn, Faroe Islands
- Running time: 45 minutes (approx.)
- Production company: REinvent Studios

Original release
- Network: Kringvarp Føroya
- Release: 17 February 2022 – present

Trom is a Faroese television drama series, created by Torfinnur Jákupsson, produced by REinvent Studios, Arte, ZDF, True North and Nordic Entertainment Group, and based on the Hannis Martinsson novels by Faroese author and literary critic Jógvan Isaksen. The series was first broadcast on Kringvarp Føroya on February 17, 2022 and is available in the Nordic countries through Viaplay. The series follows journalist Hannis Martinsson (Ulrich Thomsen) as he investigates the murder of his daughter.

== Synopsis ==
The six-part series follows a journalist, Hannis Martinsson (Ulrich Thomsen), who unexpectedly receives a message from Sonja, a daughter he did not know of, claiming that her life is in danger. He arrives in time to help search for her and discover her body. Initially the authorities assume accidental drowning, despite anomalies in the known facts. Hannis suspects her death may have something to do with her anti-whaling activism and that a local businessman, Ragnar, is somehow involved. Although the police officer investigating Sonja's death, Karla Mohr, is also suspicious of Ragnar, she conceals evidence that might lead suspicion to fall on her own son.

== Casting ==
- Ulrich Thomsen as Hannis Martinsson
- Maria Rich as Karla Mohr
- Olaf Johannessen as Ragnar í Rong
- Mariann Hansen as Anita Ravn
- Helena Heðinsdóttir as Sonja á Heyggi
- Frida av Fløtum as Turid Sonjudóttir
- Gunnvá Zachariassen as Aurora á Heyggi
- Hans Tórgarð as Haraldur Martinsson
- Michael Worthman as Stewart Peters
- Sissal Drews Hjaltalin as Jenny Mikkelsen
- Magnus Reinert Gásadal as Gunnar Mohr
- Hjálmar Dam as Gisli Bjarnason
- Páll Danielsen as Óðin í Útistovu
- Vígdis Eliesersdóttir as Kirstin Hansen
- Brandur Teitsson as Trygvi í Rong

== Development and release ==
Production work on Trom began in March 2021 and concluded in late 2021. The series was filmed in many locations across the Faroe islands, including Tórshavn and surrounding areas, and remoter villages such as Múli, Gjógv, Tjørnuvík, Velbastaður and Gasadalur.

== Broadcast ==
The series was first shown on 12 February 2022 at a special event in Tórshavn and was broadcast the following day on Kringvarp Føroya. It was made available from 13 February through Viaplay in Sweden, Norway and Denmark, and in Australia through SBS On Demand. The series was shown on BBC4 in the United Kingdom from 9 July 2022.

== Awards and nominations ==
Awards and nominations received by Westworld
Award	Year	Category	Recipient(s) and nominee(s)	Result
Golden Nymph Awards	2022	Best Actor	Ulrich Thomsen	Won
Golden Nymph Awards	2022	Jury Special Prize	Trom	Won
Edda Awards	2023	Television Show of the Year	Trom	Nominated
