= Manuel Alberto Claro =

Chilean-Danish cinematographer

- Born: 3 April 1970 (age 56); Santiago, Chile
- Other names: Emmanuel Claro; Manuel Claro; Manuel Clarou
- Education: Istituto Europeo di Design; National Film School of Denmark
- Occupations: Cinematographer; filmmaker; still photographer
- Website: www.manuelclaro.com

Manuel Alberto Claro (born 3 April 1970) is a Chilean-Danish cinematographer, filmmaker, and still photographer. He has won numerous accolades, including two Robert Awards, a Bodil Award, and a European Film Award.

== Life and career ==
Manuel Alberto Claro was born in Santiago, Chile in 1970. In 1974, he moved to Denmark and since that time lives in Copenhagen.

He graduated as a stills photographer from Milan's Istituto Europeo di Design in 1994 and then worked as an assistant photographer in Milan, New York City and Copenhagen before enrolling at the National Film School of Denmark in 1997, from where he graduated in 2001.

Since 2001 he has shot a number of features among them Reconstruction, which won the Camera d'Or in Cannes 2003 and the Bronze Frog at Camerimage 2004. Dark Horse which premiered in Un Certain Regard in Cannes 2005. Allegro which premiered at Venice Film Festival 2005 and for which he won both the Robert and the Bodil 2006 awards for best cinematography. He has been a frequent collaborator with director Lars von Trier in Melancholia, Nymphomaniac, and The House that Jack Built.

He also works on commercials for companies like IKEA, Nokia, and Volkswagen, and on music videos for the likes of FKA Twigs, Paloma Faith, Sons of Raphael and Rhye. He is an active member of the Danish Society of Cinematographers.

== Filmography ==
=== Feature films ===
- Zakka West (2003)
- Reconstruction (2003)
- Scratch (2003)
- Lille far (2004)
- Silkevejen (2004)
- Dark Horse (2005)
- Allegro (2005)
- Weapons (2007)
- Tempelriddernes skat II (2007)
- Tempelriddernes skat III (2008)
- Alt er relativt (2008)
- The Candidate (2008)
- Everything Will Be Fine (2010)
- Melancholia (2011)
- Nymph()maniac (2013)
- Top Five (2014)
- The Untamed (2016)
- The House That Jack Built (2018)
- Home (2026)

=== Short films ===
- Anxiety (2001)
- Visions of Europe (2004, segment "Europe Does Not Exist")

== Awards ==
- 2003: Golden Plaque for Reconstruction, Chicago International Filmfestival
- 2004: Bronze Frog for Reconstruction, Camerimage
- 2006: Robert for Allegro
- 2006: Bodil Award for Best Cinematographer for Allegro and Dark Horse
- 2010: Bodil Award for Best Cinematographer for Antichrist
- 2011: European Film Award
- 2012: Bodil Award for Best Cinematographer for Melancholia
