= Lydmor =

Danish singer-songwriter (born 1990)

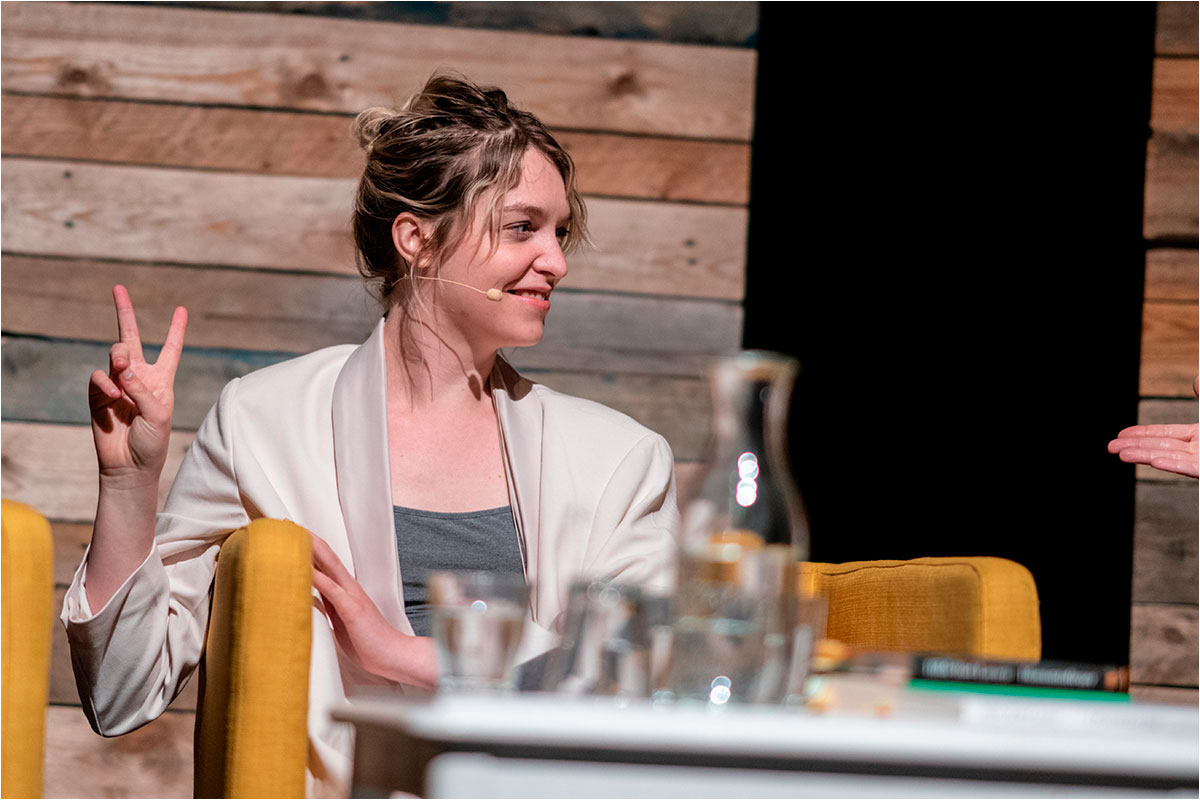
- Lydmor in 2025

Background information
- Born: Jenny Rossander; 27 January 1990 (age 36); Aarup, Denmark
- Genres: Electropop; indie rock
- Occupation: Singer-songwriter
- Years active: 2009–present
- Labels: HFN Music; Mermaid Records; Copenhagen Records; Motor Music; Loulou Records

Jenny Rossander (born 27 January 1990), known professionally as Lydmor (Danish pronunciation: [ˈlyːdmoːɐ̯]), is a Danish singer-songwriter.

== Early life ==
Jenny Rossander was born in Aarup, Denmark, on the island of Funen. She and her sister were raised by a single mother. At age 14, she moved to Struer before attending boarding school on Langeland. She later moved to Aarhus at age 17 to finish high school, after having previously dropped out. She worked several jobs during her half-year away from school, including cleaning jobs and a call center position.

While living in Aarup, Rossander began writing songs at age 14. After finishing high school at Århus Statsgymnasium, she purchased her own studio equipment, including a microphone, audio interface, and keyboard. After beginning to make songs at home, she began making electronic music at Frontløberne with a group. She explained in an interview that during her time at Frontløberne is when she received the name Lydmor (lit. 'sound mother') after frequently recording demos for other artists for free. As Lydmor, she played her first concert at Viva lá Revolution in Aalborg.

== Career ==
Alongside Bon Homme, Lydmor released the collaborative album Seven Dreams of Fire on 6 November 2015. The duo debuted the song "Dream of Fire" with the release of a music video.

Lydmor, in 2016, left Denmark and moved to Shanghai, where she lived for six months. She later admitted that following the release of Y in 2015, she found her music and persona as a musician "boring." Her next album, I Told You I'd Tell Them Our Story released in September 2018, which featured Shanghai on the cover. The album received generally positive reviews.

On 22 February 2018, at the annual Gaffa Awards, Lydmor performed during the show. She made her appearance entirely nude, wearing fluorescent paints while performing under a blacklight. The fluorescent paint remained a part of her performances during her 2018 concerts. Due to her appearance at the Gaffa Awards, she admitted being sent a letter directly from a German TV show where he was scheduled to perform, reminding her to dress "appropriately." In June, taking the place of Susanne Sundfør, Lydmor performed at the 2018 NorthSide Festival.

On 29 May 2020, Gaffa published an article written by Lydmor. In the article, she took aim at Ekstra Bladet writer Thomas Treo. The article gained traction amongst Danish media outlets, leading to a television debate between Lydmor and Ekstra Bladet editor-in-chief Poul Madsen. Her article discussed Treo's writing, which Lydmor described as "sexist" in the ways Treo described female artists.

Lydmor's experience after writing the article carried to her next album, Capacity, released in 2021. The album discusses the effects of speaking up about sexism, gender, and equality. The album became the first of her albums to reach the Hitlisten charts, peaking at number 26. Capacity went on to secure two awards at the 2022 Gaffa Awards, winning Danish Electronic Release of the Year and the HiFi Award.

== Discography ==
=== Studio albums ===
Title	Details	Peak chart positions
Title	Details	DEN
A Pile of Empty Tapes	Release date: 1 January 2012; Labels: HFN Music	—
Y	Release date: 8 January 2016; Labels: Mermaid Records, Sony Music Denmark	—
I Told You I'd Tell Them Our Story	Release date: 28 September 2018; Label: HFN Music	—
Capacity	Release date: 12 March 2021; Label: HFN Music	26
Nimue	Release date: 30 September 2022; Label: Mermaid Records	28
"—" denotes a recording that did not chart or was not released in that territory.

=== Collaborations ===
Title	Details
Seven Dreams of Fire (with Bon Homme)	Release date: 6 November 2015; Labels: HFN Music

== Awards and nominations ==
Year	Award	Category	Recipient(s)	Result	Ref.
2022	GAFFA Awards	Danish Electronic Release of the Year	Capacity	Won	
2022	GAFFA Awards	HiFi Award	Lydmor (for Capacity)	Won	
2023	GAFFA Awards	Danish Hit of the Year	"Shanghai Roar" (Acoustic version)	Nominated	
