= The Asset (TV series) =

2025 Danish TV Series

- Genre: Crime thriller
- Written by: Frederik Ringtved; Adam August
- Directed by: Samanou Acheche Sahlstrøm; Kasper Barfoed
- Starring: Clara Dessau; Maria Cordsen; Afshin Firouzi; Nicolas Bro
- Country of origin: Denmark
- Original language: Danish
- No. of seasons: 1
- No. of episodes: 6

Production
- Running time: approx. 45–50 minutes
- Production company: Profile Pictures

Original release
- Network: Netflix
- Release: 27 October 2025

The Asset (Danish: Legenden) is a Danish-language espionage crime drama that premiered globally on Netflix on 27 October 2025. It was directed by Samanou Acheche Sahlstrøm and Kasper Barfoed. Sahlstrøm was also head writer of the series along with Frederik Ringtved and Adam August. The leading role of Tea Lind is played by Clara Dessau.

== Premise ==
Tea Lind is a troubled police cadet who is recruited by the Danish Security and Intelligence Service (PET), to go undercover in the criminal underworld. Tea poses as a jeweler to befriend Ashley, the girlfriend of crime-boss Miran, with the goal of infiltrating his organization. But the deeper Tea becomes involved, the more the lines between her mission and her identity blur.

== Cast ==
- Clara Dessau as Tea Lind
- Maria Cordsen as Ashley (Miran's girlfriend)
- Afshin Firouzi as Miran
- Nicolas Bro as Folke
- Soheil Bavi as Yasin
- Arian Kashef as Bambi (Miran's brother)
- Lara Ly Melic Skovgaard as Sofia
- Annika Witt as Ibi
- Josephine Abeba as Patricia
- Dan Boie Kratfeldt as Niko
- Klaus Tange as Jensen

== Production and format ==
Produced by Danish studio Profile Pictures, the series comprises one season of six episodes, each with a runtime of approximately 45–50 minutes.

The series is directed by Samanou Acheche Sahlstrøm and Kasper Barfoed. Sahlstrøm was also head writer, which was co-written by Frederik Ringtved and Adam August. The series stars Clara Dessau as Tea Lind.

== Release ==
The Asset premiered globally on Netflix on 27 October 2025. It is available for streaming worldwide on Netflix, in the original Danish language with subtitles and dubbed options.
