= Azad Safarov =

Ukrainian journalist and filmmaker

- Born: Baku, Azerbaijan
- Citizenship: Ukraine
- Occupations: Journalist, filmmaker

Azad Safarov (born 1985/1986) is a Ukrainian journalist and filmmaker. He is a producer for Sky News and co-founder of charity organization Voices of Children.

== Early life and education ==
Safarov was born in Baku, Azerbaijan, and, in 1994, moved to Donetsk, Ukraine with his mother at age 8. His father had moved to Donetsk before them, in order to set up a business. The family lived in Donetsk for the next 15 years, and Safarov learned both Ukrainian and Russian. Safarov was bullied by other children for being an immigrant and for his skin color, so he often spent time alone in public libraries or working with his father to sell products. As a child, Safarov was interested in becoming a filmmaker, but his mother encouraged him to become a journalist, because she thought it was a peaceful job. His father encouraged him to learn Azerbaijani dances. He was 13 when his father died from stress-induced heart disease.

Safarov attended university, graduating in 2007 with a degree in journalism.

== Career ==
After graduating university, Safarov moved to Kyiv, where he lived in a communal apartment and interned at the OSCE. Shortly afterwards, he got a job working for print media, and then his first journalistic job working for 5 Kanal. He covered the Euromaidan protests in November 2013. While doing so, he was beaten on camera by then-President Viktor Yanukovych's riot police. As a freelance journalist, Safarov has worked with CNN, and Sky News. He also worked for Deutsche Welle in Germany for five years. In 2014, he began visiting Donetsk as a 5 Kanal reporter. In 2023, Safarov's Sky News team won the International Emmy for Best News for their coverage of the March 2022 battles for Bucha and Irpin.

From 2015 until 2017, Safarov was an assistant producer on the documentary film The Distant Barking of Dogs. While filming in Donbas, Safarov worked under a pseudonym for his safety.

In 2019, Safarov co-founded the organization Voices of Children with fellow Ukrainian Olena Rozvadovska. At the same time, he was working as a line producer and assistant director for the documentary A House Made of Splinters.

== Personal life ==
Safarov has Ukrainian citizenship.
