= Olena =

Olena, Olenna (Ukrainian: Олена) is a Ukrainian variant of the feminine name Helen, further equivalent to Elena It is of Greek origin and means "sun ray" or "shining light", see "Helen" for its history. Notable people with the name include:

- Olena Demydova (born 1982), Ukrainian high jumper
- Olena Dvornichenko (born 1990), Israeli Olympic rhythmic gymnast
- Olena Falkman (1849-1928), Swedish concert vocalist
- Olena Kryvytska (born 1987), Ukrainian fencer
- Olena Muravyova (born 1867), Ukrainian opera singer and vocal teacher, awarded Merited Artist of Ukrainian SSR (1938)
- Olena Nepochatenko, Ukrainian economist and academic administrator
- Olena Ovchynnikova (born 1987), Ukrainian kickboxer and mixed martial artist
- Olena Ronzhyna (born 1970), Ukrainian rower
- Olena Rozvadovska, Ukrainian children's rights advocate
- Olena Vaneeva (born 1982), Ukrainian mathematician
- Olena Zelenska (born 1978), First Lady of Ukraine
