= Monica Hellström =

Danish producer and production manager

- Born: 1975 (age 50–51); Denmark
- Education: University of Copenhagen, University of Bedfordshire
- Occupations: Producer of Documentaries and Fiction Films
- Known for: Producer of The Distant Barking of Dogs and Flee
- Title: Producer, Final Cut for Real; Producer, UpFront Films; Member, Academy of Motion Picture Arts and Sciences
- Awards: EFP Producer on the Move (2020); The Ib Award (2022)

Monica Hellström (born 1975) is a Danish film producer.

== Early life ==
Born in Greater Copenhagen in 1975, Monica Hellström moved to England to study Film & Media Production at the University of Bedfordshire (1995-1998), graduating with honours, before moving back to Denmark in 1999 to study a Masters degree in Film at the University of Copenhagen.

In 2010, Monica graduated from the EAVE Producers Workshop.

== Career ==
Starting her career as a production manager at The Danish Film Institute's Film Workshop, Monica moved to Upfront Films in 2008 as a producer and production manager. In 2010, she became a producer at the multi-award winning documentary production company Final Cut for Real.

In May 2022, Monica started her own production company, Ström Pictures.

A member of the Academy of Motion Picture Arts and Sciences, she was selected by European Film Promotion for Producer on the Move, Cannes 2020.

Monica Hellström has produced and co-produced over 20 documentaries, most notably Flee and A House Made of Splinters which both received Academy Awards nominations. Other notable films include The Distant Barking of Dogs, winner of more than 30 awards including Cinema Eye Honors, Peabody Awards and Best First Appearance Film at IDFA in 2017, Daniel Dencik’s Moon Rider, Reel Talent Award winner at 2012's CPH:DOX and Cille Hannibal and Christine Hanberg's He’s My Brother, Special Mention at CPH:DOX and Audience Award at Munich International Documentary Film Festival in 2021.

Within fiction, Monica has also co-produced the award-winning thrillers The Nile Hilton Incident and Boy from Heaven by director Tarik Saleh, and Rebecca Daly’s Good Favour.

Monica Hellström has been nominated for three Academy Awards. Twice in 2022 in the categories Best Animated Feature and Best Documentary Feature, for the documentary film Flee (which was also nominated in the Best International Feature Film category) and again in 2023 for A House Made of Splinters for Best Documentary Feature. She was also awarded The Ib Award by the Danish Board of Film Directors in 2022.

In 2024, Monica sat on the Sundance Film Festival Jury for World Cinema Documentary Competition.

== Selected filmography ==
- A House Made of Splinters (2022)
- He's My Brother (2021)
- Flee (2021; co-nominated with Jonas Poher Rasmussen, Signe Byrge Sørensen and Charlotte de la Gournerie for Best Animated Feature and Best Documentary Feature and winner of World Cinema Grand Jury Prize:Documentary at Sundance Film Festival 2021)
- Forget Me Not (2019; official selection, Nordic Dox, CPH:DOX 2019)
- The Distant Barking of Dogs (winner of best first appearance at IDFA, 2017; winner of the Peabody best documentary award 2019; winner of Spotlight Prize at Cinema Eye Honors; Oscar shortlisted, and nominated for best documentary at the European Film Awards & Emmy Awards)
- The Dvor Massacre (2016)
- The Fencing Champion (2014)
- The Sumo Wrestler’s Son (2013)
- MoonRider (2012)
- The World’s Best Chef (2011)

Co-producer

- Boy From Heaven (2022)
- Little Girl (2020)
- Good Favour (2017)
- The Nile Hilton Incident (2017)
- Concerning Violence (2014)
- Ruth (2015)
- Varicella (2015)
- Dancing for You (2015)
- Chapter 7 (2015)
