= The Olsen Gang in Deep Trouble =

Danish animated film

- Theatrical release poster
- Danish: Olsen-banden på dybt vand
- Directed by: Jørgen Lerdam
- Screenplay by: Tine Krull Petersen
- Produced by: Tomas Radoor; René Ezra
- Edited by: Hans Perk; Anders Sørensen
- Music by: Jeppe Kaas; Bent Fabricius-Bjerre
- Production companies: A. Film Production; Nordisk Film
- Distributed by: Nordisk Film Distribution
- Release date: 10 October 2013
- Running time: 80 minutes
- Country: Denmark
- Language: Danish
- Box office: $2,444,372

The Olsen Gang in Deep Trouble (Danish: Olsen-banden på dybt vand) is a 2013 Danish animated comedy film directed by Jørgen Lerdam from a screenplay by Tine Krull Petersen. The film is a sequel to Olsen Gang Gets Polished and is the second animated film in the Olsen Gang franchise. Produced by A. Film Production and Nordisk Film, it was released on 10 October 2013.

== Voice cast ==
- Martin Buch as Egon Olsen
- Nicolaj Kopernikus as Benny Frandsen
- Kurt Ravn as Kjeld Jensen
- Annette Heick as Yvonne Jensen
- Lars Ranthe as Dynamite Harry
- Søren Sætter-Lassen as Bang Johansen
- Michael Carøe as Bang Bang Johnson
- Søs Egelind as Ilza
- Henrik Lykkegaard as Jensen's criminal assistant
- Jonas Schmidt as Holm

== See also ==
- Olsenbanden Jr.
