= War Fragments Museum =

The War Fragments Museum is a cultural preservation project that collects, documents, and preserves artifacts from Ukrainian communities affected by the Russian invasion of Ukraine. The initiative collects artifacts from all regions of Ukraine, preserves them in transparent cubes made of epoxy resin, and then sells them to raise money for humanitarian aid and support for Ukraine's armed forces. Voices of Children and Azov Battalion Family Foundation in Mariupol have both received proceeds from War Fragments Museum.

Artifacts have included a lego piece from Taras Shevchenko Park in Kyiv, wreckage from the Ukrainian-made transport aircraft Mriya, and a piece of a chair from Yuri Gagarin Stadium.

== History ==
Launched after Russia's full-scale invasion of Ukraine in 2022, the War Fragments Museum has collected artifacts from communities such as Kyiv, Kharkiv, Chernihiv, and Kherson. The project is currently led by Tetyana Fiks.

The War Fragments Museum has currently produced over 300 cubes of collected artifacts.

== Exhibitions ==
The War Fragments Museum has exhibited at the Odesa National Art Museum, and the artifacts collection at Saint Sophia Cathedral.
