= Vitello (film) =

- Theatrical release poster
- Directed by: Dorte Bengtson
- Written by: Dorte Bengtson; Kim Fupz Aakeson
- Based on: Vitello by Kim Fupz Aakeson and Niels Bo Bojesen
- Produced by: Anders Berthelsen; Bob Last
- Edited by: Dorte Bengtson; Bobbie Esra Geelmuyden Pertan
- Music by: Philippe Boix-Vives
- Production companies: Zentropa Entertainments; SellOutPictures
- Distributed by: Angel Films
- Release date: 1 February 2018
- Running time: 72 minutes
- Countries: Denmark; United Kingdom
- Language: Danish

Vitello is a 2018 animated comedy-drama film directed by Dorte Bengtson in her directorial debut, and co-written by Bengtson and Kim Fupz Aakeson. It is based on a series of children's books by the same name by Aakeson and illustrated by Niels Bo Bojesen. The voice cast includes Samuel Søby Bang as the titular character and Sidse Babett Knudsen as his mother, along with Bodil Jørgensen, Nicolaj Kopernikus, and Birthe Neumann.

== Voice cast ==
- Samuel Søby Bang as Vitello
- Sidse Babett Knudsen as Vitello's mother
- Bodil Jørgensen as Georgine Dame
- Nicolaj Kopernikus as Gregers
- Birthe Neumann as an elderly lady
- Eliya Coco Bülow as Kamma
- Morten Grunwald as God
- Paul Hüttel as an elderly man
- Lado Hadzic as a mailman
- Sander Herstad Lauridsen as Max and Hasse
- Otto Harald Svæverud as a sick boy and Rudi
- Adrian Seier Aarup as William

== Production ==
Production began in 2017. The animation is based on the illustrations by Niels Bo Bojesen in 13 of Aakeson's books about the boy Vitello. Books in the series have been translated into English, with titles such as Vitello Wants a Dad, and Vitello Scratches a Car.

Vitello was co-produced by SellOutPictures and Lars von Trier's production company Zentropa Entertainments. It was screened at the 72nd Edinburgh International Film Festival.

== Reception ==
Amber Wilkinson at Eye For Film UK, who gave a positive review for its animation, saying: "Taking the hand-drawn style from the original books, the animation is spare and has an engaging childlike quality, with Vitello's hair and cheeks little more than cheeky scribbles. This is fitting for a film that takes the child's eye view of life, with reactions deliberately skewed to Vitello's perspective."

=== Accolades ===
Vitello was nominated for three Robert Awards: Best Children/Youth Film, Best Adapted Screenplay, and Best Original Song.

== Television adaptation ==
Vitello was divided into a 13-episode television series released on July 1, 2018, with most of the cast reprise the roles, alongside Dorte Bengtson and Kim Fupz Aakeson also returns.
