= List of Mad Cave Studios publications =

List of comic book publications

This is a list of publications by Mad Cave Studios and its related companies.

== Mad Cave Studios ==
=== Comic books ===
- 51 (2026-present)
- A Legacy of Violence (2022–2024)
- Astro Quantum (2026–present)
- Babylon Cove (2026)
- Barbarian Behind Bars (2026)
- Battlecats Vol. 1 (2018)
  - Battlecats Vol. 2 (2019)
  - Battlecats Vol. 3 (2021-2022)
  - Battlecats: Tales of Valderia (2019–2020)
- Becstar (2021)
- Blade Forger (2025)
- Blue Palo Verde (2025)
- The Body Trade (2024–2025)
- Bountiful Garden (2021–2022)
- Buried Long, Long Ago (2025)
- Bytchcraft (2025)
- Charred Remains (2023–2024)
- Circus Maximus (2025–2026)
- Crusader (2023)
- Crush Depth (2025)
- Cyberarchy (2025–2026)
- Dahlia in the Dark (2022–2023)
- Dark Empty Void (2024–2025)
- Dark Pyramid (2025)
- Deer Editor (2024)
- The Devil that Wears my Face (2023–2024)
- Don't Forget Your Briefcase (2025)
- Don't Spit in the Wind (2023)
- Dry Foot (2020)
- Eat Your Young (2025–2026)
- Edenfrost (2023–2024)
- Exorcists Never Die (2023)
- Exploit (2026)
- Far Down Below (2025)
- Ferocious (2025-2026)
- Filthy Lambs (2026)
- The Florida Hippopotamus Cocaine Massacre (2026)
- Flow (2025-2026)
- Galaxy of Madness (2024–2025)
- Gunpowder Prophets (2025–2026)
- Hammer Head (2026)
- Hellfighter Quin (2020)
- The Hexiles (2024–2025)
- Hollywood Trash (2020–2021)
- Hunt. Kill. Repeat. (2023)
- Is Ted OK? (2026)
- It Killed Everyone But Me (2025–2026)
- Kill Train (2025)
- Knights of the Golden Sun (2018–2021)
- Kosher Mafia (2024–2025)
- The Last Session (2021–2022)
- The Last Wardens (2024–2025)
- Lazarus Order (2026)
- Leo da Vinci: Renaissance Kid (2026)
- Liquidator (2025–2026)
- Long Cold Winter (2024–2025)
- Look Into My Eyes (2025)
- Love Me: A Romance Story (2024)
- The Mammoth (2024)
- Missing on the Moon (2024-2025)
- Monomyth (2023)
- Morning Star (2024)
- Mugshots (2024)
- Murder Kingdom (2024-2025)
- Nature's Labyrinth (2022-2023)
- The New Space Age (2025-2026)
- Nottingham (2021-2024)
  - Tales from Nottingham (2023)
- The Omega Book (2026)
- One Path (2025-present)
- Orla! (2025)
- Our Soot Stained Heart (2025-2026
- Over the Ropes (2019-2020)
  - Over the Ropes: Broken Kayfabe (2022)
- The Pale Knight (2025)
- Pantomime (2020-2021)
- Past Time (2025)
- Pop Kill (2025)
  - Pop Kill: Big Candy (2026)
- Potions Inc. (2022)
- Prairie Gods (2024-2025)
- Project Riese (2023-2024)
- Red Vector (2025)
- Sanction (2024)
- Savage Bastards (2020)
- Show's End (2019)
- Skeeters (2023-2024)
- The Slasher's Apprentice (2025)
- Soul Taker (2024-2025)
- Spectrum (2024-2025)
- Speed Republic (2022)
- Stargazer (2020-2021)
- Synap (2024-2025)
- Temporal (2025-2026)
- Terminal Punks (2020-2021)
- Terrorbytes (2025-2026)
- They Fell From the Sky (2021)
- The Tiger's Tongue (2022)
- Under the Influence (2023)
- Vanishing Point (2025)
- Villainous (2020-2021)
- You've Been Cancelled (2023)
- War Wolf (2025-2026)
- Whatever Happened to the Crimson Justice? (2025-2026)
- When the Blood Has Dried (2024)
- Where Does the Rainbow End? (2026)
- Wild Animals (2025)

==== Underworld Universe ====
- Phase 0
  - Honor and Curse (2019–2021)
  - Midnight Task Force (2018)
  - RV9 (2019–2020)
  - Wolvenheart (2019–2022)
- Phase 1
  - Revolution 9 — Remake of RV9 (2024–present)
  - Hour of the Wolf — Remake of Wolvenheart (2024–present)
  - Exit City — Remake of Midnight Task Force (2024–present)
  - Endless Night — Crossover event series (2025)
- Phase 2
  - Honor and Curse: Eternal — Sequel to Honor and Curse (2026–present)
  - Mister Nemo — Spin-off of Exit City (2026)
  - Victoria Jaguar — Spin-off of Honor and Curse: Eternal (2026)

==== Licensed works ====
- Casshan (2026)
- Contra (2026)
- Defenders of the Earth (2024–2025)
  - Defenders of the Earth: Dark Destiny (2025–2026)
- Dick Tracy (2024–present)
  - Dick Tracy: Valentine's Day Special (2025)
  - Dick Tracy: Halloween Special (2025)
  - Dick Tracy: St. Patrick's Day Special (2026)
- Flash Gordon (2024–present)
  - Flash Gordon Quarterly (2024–present)
- Gatchaman (2024–present)
  - Gatchaman: Galactor (2024)
  - Gatchaman: The Solo Adventures
    - Gatchaman: Ken — Deathmatch (2024)
    - Gatchaman: Jun — Apex Heart (2024)
    - Gatchaman: Joe — Bloodline Impulse (2025)
    - Gatchaman: Ryu — Scavengers (2025)
    - Gatchaman: Jinpei — Henshin (2026)
  - Gatchaman: Only One Earth (2025)
  - Gatchaman: Red Impulse (2026)
- The Last Starfighter (coming 2026)
- The Phantom (2025-present)
- Planet Atmos: Exordium (2026-present)
- Speed Racer (2025–present)
  - Racer X (2025–present)
  - Speed Racer: Tales from the Road (2026–present)

==== Reprints ====
- The Last Starfighter (reprinted 2026)
- Neil Gaiman's Teknophage (2015–2018)

=== Graphic novels ===
- A Phone Call Away (2024)
- Attaboy (2024)
- Beneath (2025)
- Breaklands (2025-present)
- Boxed (2025)
- Clay Footed Giants (2024)
- Flash Gordon: The 1995 Special (reprinted 2026)
- Flash Gordon: The Movie Adaptation (reprinted 2026)
- GhostBox (2025)
- Grimm Tales from the Cave (2022)
  - Tales from the Cave (2023)
- Groupies (2025)
- Hotblood! (2025)
- Hound (2024)
- John Tiffany (2023)
- The Karman Line (2023)
- L.A. Strong (2025) — A charity anthology to aid the victims of the January 2025 Southern California wildfires.
- The Legendary Lynx (2024)
- Lower Your Sights (2022) — A charity anthology in collaboration with Voices of Children to aid the victims of the Russo-Ukrainian war.
- Mary Shelley: The Eternal Dream (2026)
- MidState (2026)
- Momo (2026)
- The Mushroom Knight (2024)
- Nikola Tesla (2026)
- Nostalgia (2025)
- Princess Nightmare (2026)
- Socrates: Death of a Philosopher (2025)
- Sunder (2025)
- Vincent van Gogh: Sadness Will Last Forever (2026)
- Virginia Woolf (2026)
- Wag (2026)
- Whisper of the Woods (2023)
- Xero (2025)

== Maverick (young adult graphic novels) ==
- Abuzz
- Across the Wildest Sea
- Beat Every 1-Up
- Block'd
- Confetti Realms
- The College Try
- Damsel From D.I.S.T.R.E.S.S.
- Fate: The Winx Saga
- Good Game, Well Played
- Heartbreak Hotel
- I Didn't Ask for This
- I'm a Mess
- In Mourning
- King Arthur and the Knights of Justice
  - Princess Gwenevere and the Jewel Riders
- Mariko Between Worlds
- Navigating with You
- Needle and Thread
- Nightmare in Savannah
- The October Girl
- Of Her Own Design
- Paper Planes
- Penelope’s Escape from the Platypusary
- The Pirate Princess
- Queen Kodiak
- Sarah and Darah
- Scoop
- Student Government
- Tectiv
- Teleportation and Other Luxuries
- The Three Beasts
- Tiger Girls
- Tommy the Coward
- Voyage de Gourmet
- Whisper of the Woods
- Wild Animals
- World Class
- Wrack & Rune

== Papercutz ==
- 101 Dalmatians
- Action Cat & Adventure Bug
- Amelia Shadows
- Asterix
  - Dogmatix and the Indomitables
- Aw, Nuts!: The Crumbelievable Adventures of Peanut & Jelly
- Bat Pat
- Beat Every 1-Up
- Chloe: Truth & Dare
- Clyde
- Double Booking
- The Extraordinary Voyages
- Flash Gordon: The Girl From Infinity
- Frozen
- Geronimo Stilton: Reporter 3-in-1
- The Ghost of Wreckers Cove
- Herobear and the Kid
- Jackson's Wilder Adventures
- Jane American
- The Little Mermaid
- I'm Lucky to Have My Parents
- Midnight Island
- Miraculous Chibi
- Monster Club
- Mulan
- The New Adventures of Encanto
- The New Adventures of Moana 2
- The New Adventures of Turning Red
- The New Adventures of Zootopia 2
- Ninja Kaiju
- Paw & Order
- The Pi-Rats
- The Princess and the Frog
- Punk Taco Adventures!
- Ralph Azham
- Secret S.T.E.A.M. Society
- Speed Racer Adventures
- Star Wars: Smugglers and Scoundrels
- Star Wars: Tales from the Outer Rim
- The Stone of Shiro
- The Sword in the Stone
- Tamia and the Memories of the Dragon
- Ten-Ton Titan Terrier
- Three Thieves
- Webster the Spider Monkey
- Winx Club
- The Witches of Pepperwood
- Yahgz

== Nakama Press (manga) ==
- A Little Step
- Ace of the Diamond
- Aperture
- Archipelago
- The Architect's Epiphany
- The Boyfriend
- Cat Mask Boy
- Cyber Phoenix
- Diablomachia
- God Tier
- Hokis, Focus!
- Indigo
- Infini-T Force
- Last Call to Leave Earth
- My Soul Mate
- Naraka Warrior
- Pandola
- Samurai Pizza Cats
- See You in Memories
- The Theory of K.O.
- World Enders
- The Zeros

== Amazing Comics (Dupuis) ==
- Disciple
