= Vic Carmen Sonne =

Danish actress (born 1994)

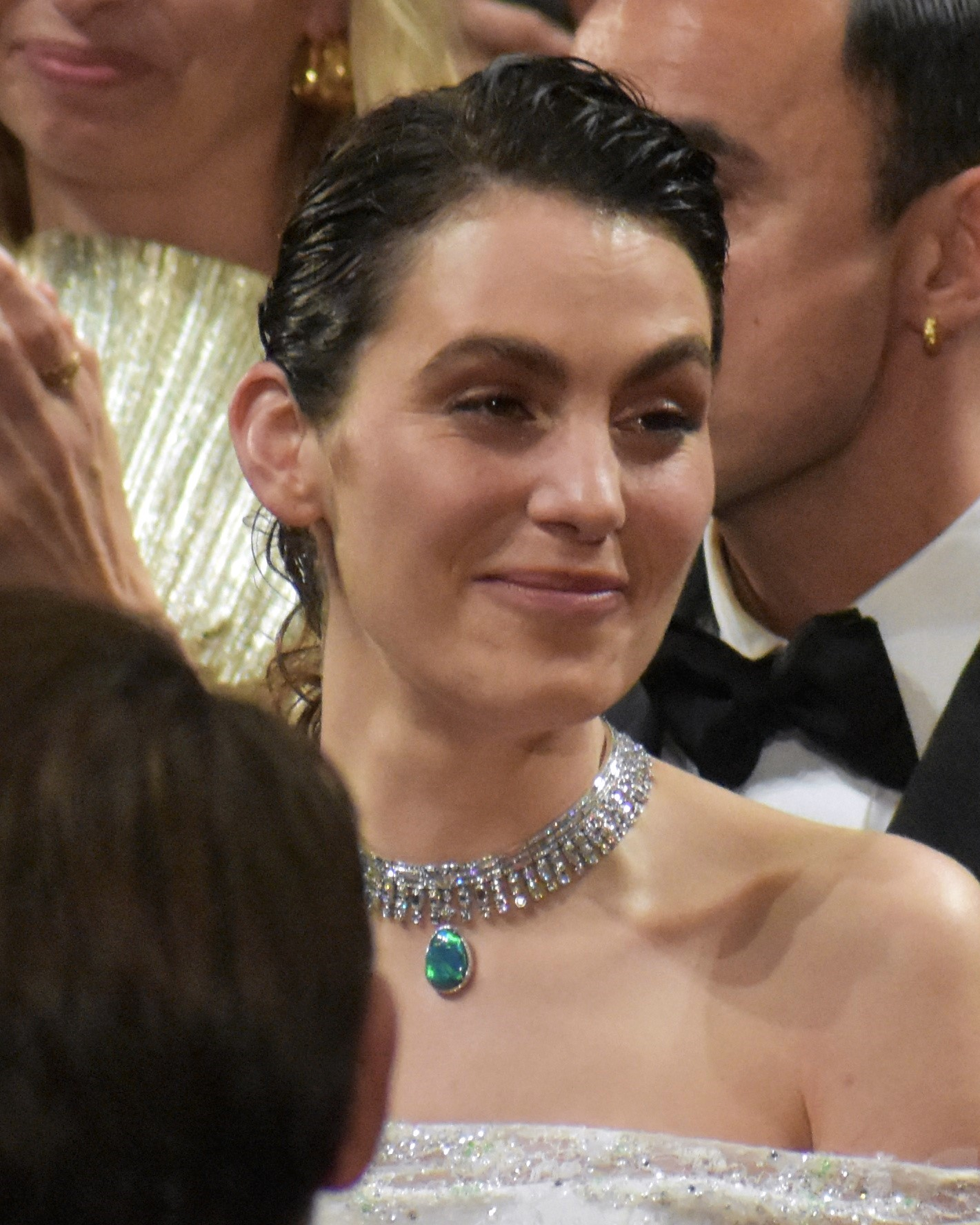
- Sonne at the 2024 Cannes Film Festival
- Born: Victoria Carmen Sonne; 23 April 1994 (age 32); Copenhagen, Denmark
- Education: Danish National School of Performing Arts
- Occupation: Actress
- Years active: 2011–present

Victoria "Vic" Carmen Sonne (born 23 April 1994) is a Danish actress. She is best known for her roles in the films Winter Brothers (2017), Holiday (2018), Godland (2022), and The Girl with the Needle (2024). She has won two Bodil Awards and two Robert Awards.

== Biography ==
Sonne was born and raised in Copenhagen. She is of Polish, Persian, and Russian descent. She attended the Akademiet For Utæmmet Kreativitet and was admitted to the Danish National School of Performing Arts at the age of 17. She graduated in 2016. She auditioned for Simon Staho's 2011 film Love Is in the Air after seeing an ad in MetroXpress seeking out actors.

She has attention deficit hyperactivity disorder.

== Filmography ==
=== Film ===
Year	Title	Role	Notes	Ref.
2011	Rebounce	Mie		
2011	Love Is in the Air	Therese		
2012	You & Me Forever	Sofie		
2014	Teenland	Sally	Short film	
2015	The Elite	Asta		
2015	Melon Rainbow	Melissa	Short film	
2016	Copenhague: A Love Story	Victoria		
2016	In the Blood	Emilie		
2017	Winter Brothers	Anna		
2017	Songs in the Sun	Julie		
2018	Holiday	Sascha		
2018	Neon Heart	Laura		
2019	Psychosia	Jenny		
2021	Miss Osaka	Ines / April		
2022	Godland	Anna		
2022	Det Vi Plejer	Mira	Short film	
2024	Azrael	Miriam		
2024	The Girl with the Needle	Karoline		
2024	Eksplosjoner i Hjertet	Billy		
2025	The Birthday Party	Sofia Timoleon		
TBA	The Temple	TBA		

=== Television ===
Year	Title	Role	Notes	Ref.
2021	Red Election	Katrine Poulson	10 episodes	
2022	The Kingdom	Medical student	5 episodes	
2024	Bullshit	Bettina	6 episodes	
2024	The Helicopter Heist	Alexandra "Alex" Refn	8 episodes	

== Awards and nominations ==
Award	Year	Category	Nominated work	Result	Ref.
Berlin International Film Festival	2020	EFP Shooting Star		Won	
Bodil Awards	2017	Best Actress in a Supporting Role	In the Blood	Won	
Bodil Awards	2019	Best Actress in a Leading Role	Holiday	Won	
Bodil Awards	2020	Best Actress in a Leading Role	Neon Heart	Nominated	
European Film Awards	2024	Best Actress	The Girl with the Needle	Nominated	
Oldenburg International Film Festival	2018	Seymour Cassel Award	Holiday	Won	
Polish Film Awards	2025	Best Actress	The Girl with the Needle	Won	
Robert Awards	2017	Best Actress in a Supporting Role	In the Blood	Nominated	
Robert Awards	2018	Best Actress in a Supporting Role	Winter Brothers	Won	
Robert Awards	2019	Best Actress in a Leading Role	Holiday	Nominated	
Robert Awards	2020	Best Actress in a Supporting Role	Psychosia	Nominated	
Robert Awards	2020	Best Actress in a Leading Role	Neon Heart	Nominated	
Robert Awards	2022	Best Actress in a Leading Role	Miss Osaka	Nominated	
Robert Awards	2023	Best Actress in a Leading Role	Godland	Nominated	
Robert Awards	2025	Best Actress in a Supporting Television Role	Bullshit	Won	
