= Winter Brothers =

2017 Danish-Icelandic drama film

- Theatrical release poster
- Danish: Vinterbrødre
- Icelandic: Vetrarbræður
- Directed by: Hlynur Pálmason
- Written by: Hlynur Pálmason
- Produced by: Per Damgaard Hansen; Julie Waltersdorph Hansen
- Starring: Elliott Crosset Hove; Simon Sears; Vic Carmen Sonne; Lars Mikkelsen
- Cinematography: Maria von Hausswolff
- Edited by: Julius Krebs Damsbo
- Music by: Toke Brorson Odin
- Distributed by: Øst for Paradis
- Release dates: 3 August 2017 (Locarno); 30 September 2017 (Iceland); 7 December 2017 (Denmark)
- Running time: 94 minutes
- Countries: Denmark; Iceland
- Languages: Danish; English

Winter Brothers (Danish: Vinterbrødre) is a 2017 Danish-Icelandic drama film written and directed by Hlynur Pálmason, in his feature-length film debut. It stars Elliott Crosset Hove and Simon Sears as a pair of limestone worker brothers, whose disparate traits collide as issues of masculinity, isolation, and brotherly love are broached. The film won numerous awards, including two Bodil Awards and nine Robert Awards—each of which resulted in victories from their respective ceremonies' highest honor, Best Danish Film.

== Plot ==
Brothers Emil and Johan live together and work together at a quarry mining limestone. Emil is eccentric and misanthropic and is socially outcast, but discreetly sells workers illicit home-brewed alcohol, for which he and Johan steal unlabeled liquid chemicals from the quarry's processing plant.

Emil visits a local hermit (credited as "the long-haired man") to collect repayment for an undisclosed debt (presumably alcohol sold to him on credit) and the hermit cannot repay, but Emil accepts a semi-automatic M1 rifle as settlement.

At the quarry, Emil is caught during a shift sneaking a drink of his brew by a supervisor, and the following morning, Johan and Emil are denied transport to the quarry by the driver and are forced to walk. Johan tells Emil a rumor has circulated that Emil's brew has made one of their coworkers gravely ill. Johan calls Emil "dark and aggressive," and Emil says, "Everyone has a little darkness in them," with which Johan disagrees. On a wall at the quarry plant, there's a crudely spray-painted scene of the coworker drinking poison and falling dead. In the mine, Emil asks his coworkers if they want to buy alcohol, and they all decline, citing various excuses. He accosts a coworker, who throws a limestone brick at him, which hits him in the temple. That night, Emil watches an army-issued rifle training video.

The following day, Emil's boss, Carl, summons him under the pretext of a review, during which he mocks Emil and confronts him about stealing from the plant and selling "toxic" homebrew. Two supervisors force-feed Emil an entire bottle of his brew and then throw him out of the plant onto a quarry slope. Emil has a shock-induced hallucination that Johan's girlfriend Anna is lying next to Emil and professes her love to him, and he later hallucinates that Carl is the rifle instructor in the training video and Emil and his coworkers are the trainees.

At home, Emil interrupts Johan and Anna having sex, attacking Johan. During their tussle, Anna sneaks out a window and Johan chokes Emil out, resuscitating him with CPR.

The ill coworker dies, and another worker threatens Emil at the quarry and tells him to leave and stay away, relating a story of a man and his loyal dog in which the man tells the dog to wait at the entrance to the mine while the man works, and the mine collapses, killing everyone inside, and the dog waits until it starves to death.

The next day, Johan leaves for the quarry, and Anna, who stayed the night with him, wakes Emil, who's sleeping on the couch. Emil shows Anna a card trick, and then a chemistry trick. In the mine, Johan's coworkers ostracize him and begin barking at him.

== Cast ==
- Elliott Crosset Hove as Emil
- Simon Sears as Johan
- Vic Carmen Sonne as Anna
- Lars Mikkelsen as Carl
- Anders Hove as The Long-Haired Man (Neighbor)
- Michael Brostrup as Michael
- Peter Plaugborg as Daniel
- Birgit Thøt Jensen as Helle
- Laurits Honoré Rønne as August
- Frédéric André as Nick

== Release ==
Winter Brothers debuted in the Concorso Internazionale section at the 2017 Locarno Film Festival on 3 August 2017. It was screened in the Discovery section at the 2017 Toronto International Film Festival. It later premiered in the USA at the 47th annual New Directors/New Films Festival at Lincoln Center in Manhattan, NYC.

== Reception ==
=== Critical response ===
On the review aggregator website Rotten Tomatoes, 91% of 11 critics' reviews are positive, with an average rating of 7.7/10. Metacritic, which uses a weighted average, assigned the film a score of 63 out of 100, based on 8 critics, indicating "generally favorable" reviews.

Jessica Kiang of Variety called the film "an impressively original, auspiciously idiosyncratic debut, one that scratches away at truths about masculinity, lovelessness, and isolation, that are no less true for being all but inexpressible". Film critic Neil Young of The Hollywood Reporter called it "a confidently handled, promisingly edgy feature debut from Copenhagen-based, Icelandic writer-director Hlynur Pálmason".

=== Accolades ===
Winter Brothers won the 2018 Bodil Award for Best Danish Film and Best Cinematography (Maria von Hausswolff). Both Elliott Crosset Hove and Simon Sears received nominations for Best Lead Actor and Best Supporting Actor, respectively, for portraying the titular brothers.

At the 2018 Robert Awards, the film won the Robert Award for Best Danish Film, as well as eight other merit awards: Pàlmason for Best Director, Crosset Hove for Best Lead Actor, Vic Carmen Sonne for Best Supporting Actress, as well as the Roberts for Best Cinematography, Best Production Design, Best Sound Design, Best Costume Design, and the Robert Award for Best Makeup. In addition, both Sears and Lars Mikkelsen earned Best Supporting Actor nominations. The film earned three further nominations in the categories of Best Screenplay, Best Editing, and Best Score.

Year	Award	Category	Recipient	Result	Refs
2018	Robert Awards	Best Danish Film	Hlynur Pálmason (filmmaker); Per Damgaard Hansen (producer); Julie Waltersdorph Hansen (producer)	Won	
2018	Robert Awards	Best Director	Hlynur Pálmason	Won	
2018	Robert Awards	Best Screenplay	Hlynur Pálmason	Nominated	
2018	Robert Awards	Best Lead Actor	Elliott Crosset Hove	Won	
2018	Robert Awards	Best Supporting Actor	Lars Mikkelsen	Nominated	
2018	Robert Awards	Best Supporting Actor	Simon Sears	Nominated	
2018	Robert Awards	Best Supporting Actress	Vic Carmen Sonne	Won	
2018	Robert Awards	Best Cinematography	Maria von Hausswolff	Won	
2018	Robert Awards	Best Costume Design	Nina Grønlund	Won	
2018	Robert Awards	Best Editing	Julius Krebs Damsbo	Nominated	
2018	Robert Awards	Best Makeup	Katrine Tersgov	Won	
2018	Robert Awards	Best Production Design	Gustav Pontoppidan	Won	
2018	Robert Awards	Best Score	Toke Brorson Odin	Nominated	
2018	Robert Awards	Best Sound Design	Lars Halvorsen	Won	
2018	Bodil Awards	Best Danish Film	Hlynur Pálmason	Won	
2018	Bodil Awards	Best Lead Actor	Elliott Crosset Hove	Nominated	
2018	Bodil Awards	Best Supporting Actor	Simon Sears	Nominated	
2018	Bodil Awards	Best Cinematographer	Maria von Hausswolff	Won	
