= Kim Fupz Aakeson =

Danish writer, illustrator, and screenwriter (born 1958)

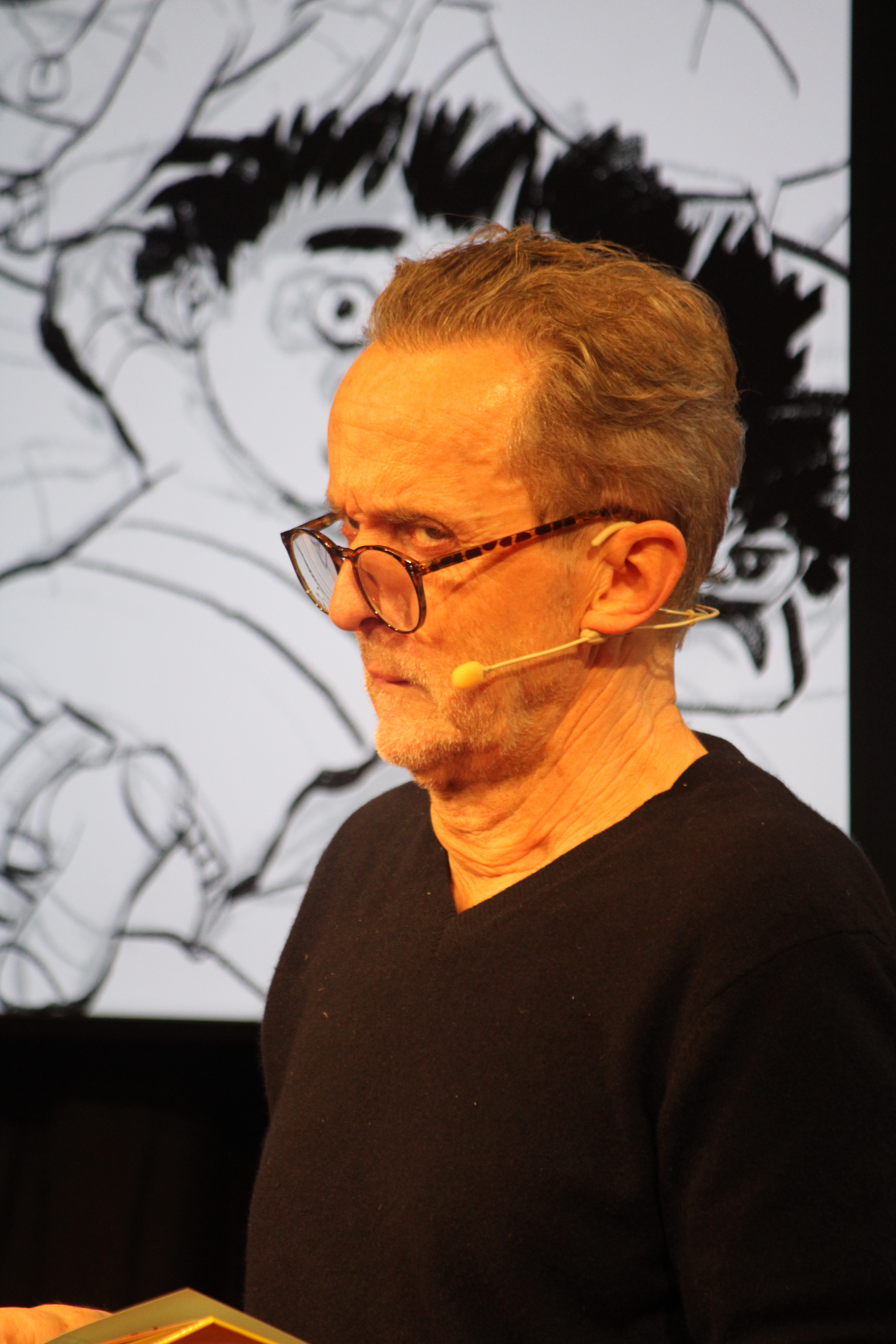
- Fupz Aakeson in 2025
- Born: Kim Fobian Aakeson; 12 September 1958 (age 67); Copenhagen, Denmark
- Occupations: Screenwriter, writer, illustrator

Kim Fupz Aakeson (born 12 September 1958) is a Danish screenwriter, writer, and illustrator. He is known for the 2023 TV series Prisoner (Huset), starring Sofie Gråbøl and David Dencik, which he created and wrote.

== Early life ==
Kim Fupz Aakeson was born in Copenhagen, Denmark, on 12 September 1958. His original middle name was Fobian.

== Career ==
Aakeson is a Danish writer, illustrator, and screenwriter.

He is the co-author of a series of children's books about a character called Vitello, illustrated by Niels Bo Bojesen. Books in the series have been translated into English, with titles such as Vitello Wants a Dad, and Vitello Scratches a Car. Aakeson co-wrote the script for the 2018 film Vitello, along with director Dorte Bengtson.

He was a co-writer on the 2020 Danish family drama series Cry Wolf (Ulven kommer), created by Maja Jul Larsen (Note: An upcoming project by FX starring Olivia Colman was announced on 20 February 2025.) Larsen's script won the 2021 Nordisk Film & TV Fond Prize for scriptwriting at the TV Drama Vision strand at the 2020 Göteborg Film Festival, which was held online.

Aakeson's script for the 8-episode Norwegian drama series Welcome to Utmark (Velkommen til Utmark), produced by Paradox Film 8 for HBO Europe, was nominated for the 2021 Nordisk Film & TV Fond Prize for scriptwriting. He was co-creator of the series, with Icelandic director Dagur Kári.

He is the creator of the six-part 2023 Danish crime drama series Prisoner (Danish title: Huset), and directed and co-created by Michael Noer and Frederik Louis Hviid, and starring Sofie Gråbøl and David Dencik. It was inspired by Aakeson's 2021 novel Fangeleg. The series was acquired by the BBC in 2023, and won the Robert Award for Best Danish Television Series in February 2024.

== Selected filmography ==
Film
Year	Title	Notes
2023	Prisoner (Huset)	TV series; creator
2021	Welcome to Utmark	TV series; co-creator and writer
2020	Cry Wolf (Ulven kommer)	TV series; co-writer
2018	Vitello	Animated children's film; based on Aakeson's books and script co-written by Aakeson and director Dorte Bengtson
2014	In Order of Disappearance	Thriller film starring Stellan Skarsgard; screenwriter
2012	A Caretaker's Tale	Film
2011	Perfect Sense	Film
2011	Room 304	Film
2010	A Family	Film
2010	A Somewhat Gentle Man	Film
2007	Second Half	Film
2006	Prague	Film; co-writer, with director Ole Christian Madsen
2006	A Soap	Film
2002	Minor Mishaps	Film
1999	The One and Only	Film
