= Simon Staho =

Danish film director

Simon Staho (born 1972) is a Danish film director. His most notable films include: Dag och natt (2004), Bang Bang Orangutang (2005), Daisy Diamond (2007), and Magi i Luften (2011).

== Career ==
Staho’s first feature film Vildspor (English: Wildside) debuted in 1998. It was shot in Iceland and starred Mads Mikkelsen and Nikolaj Coster-Waldau. It was selected for the San Sebastian International Film Festival.

In 2002, Staho directed Nu (English: Now), a short film about a man whose marriage is destroyed when he has a secret homosexual relationship. The film was shot in black and white and starred Mads Mikkelsen and Mikael Persbrandt.

With a cast of Swedish actors, Staho directed Dag och Natt (English: Day and Night) in 2004. It was selected for the San Sebastian Film Festival and won the Silver Hugo Award at the Chicago International Film Festival. His 2005 film, Bang Bang Orangutang, was also selected for the San Sebastian International Film Festival. The film is a tragic-comic story about the humiliations of a power-drunk businessman trying to pick up the pieces of his destroyed life, after he has killed his youngest son in a car accident.

Staho returned to a mostly Danish cast in his 2007 film, Daisy Diamond. It too was selected for the San Sebastian International Film Festival. The story follows Anna, played by Noomi Rapace, who dreams of making it as an actress. When she becomes pregnant, her struggle to give her baby a good start in life culminates in a desperate act that has fatal consequences. Noomi Rapace won the two top Danish film awards—the Bodil prize and Robert prize—for Best Actress for her role in Daisy Diamond.

In 2008, Staho directed Himlens Hjärta (English: Heaven's Heart) which was selected for the Berlin International Film Festival. The film is a four character chamber drama that details a marital breakup, focusing on two middle-aged married couples as they confront their adulterous impulses. Actress Maria Lundqvist won the Guldbagge Award for Best Actress in a Leading Role for her role in Himlens Hjärta. That same year, Staho was the recipient of the Ingmar Bergman Travel Grant.

Kärlekens Krigare (English: Warriors of Love) was shot in black in white and debuted in 2009. The film follows a lesbian couple whose relationship is threatened by a long-buried secret: Ida’s father sexually abused her as a child, and serious emotional scars remain. It premiered at the Locarno International Film Festival.

In 2011, Staho directed the musical Magi i Luften (English: Love Is In The Air) about the adventures of four teenagers during one single night. The film was selected for the Berlin International Film Competition in 2012. Also in 2012, Staho was awarded the three-year working grant from the Danish Arts Council. Staho's ninth film, Miraklet (English: The Miracle) starred Ulrich Thomsen, Sonja Richter, and Peter Plaugborg. It premiered in 2013 at the Montreal Film Festival, where it won the Best Actor award. It was also selected for the Main Competition at the Chicago International Film Festival.

In 2014, he directed Jørgen Leth - Fem Undersøgelser (English: Jørgen Leth - Five Studies) about the Danish poet and filmmaker Jørgen Leth. In the film, Staho dives into Leth's collected works, frame-by-frame, line-by-line, collaging film clips with poems and revisiting more than 50 years of Leth's poetry and film. As its title suggests, the resulting work consisted of five films: Andy Warhol Eats A Burger (112 min.), The White Man (7 min.), Black Snow (10 min.), I Destroy You With My Machine (15 min.) and What There Is (7 min.) The films premiered at gallery Andersen's Contemporary, Copenhagen in Autumn 2014.

Also in 2014, Staho directed the stage play Hjertet Skælver (English: The Heart Trembles) at Denmark's largest regional theatre, Aarhus Theatre. The play was written by Danish playwright Peter Asmussen, who has written several screenplays with Staho. In 2015, Staho directed the stage play "Det Der eR/DDR" at Husets Teater in Copenhagen. The text was written by playwright Peter Asmussen.

Simon Staho has written the poetry collection "Natten er en kiste af sort ild" ("The Night Is a Coffin of Black Fire") published in 2022.

Simon Staho's trilogy "Sho'ah 1-3" – consisting of two poetry collections and a hybrid novel – was published in 2024.

== Filmography ==
- 1998 – Vildspor (English: Wildside)
- 2002 – Nu (Now)
- 2004 – Dag och natt (Day and Night)
- 2005 – Bang Bang Orangutang
- 2007 – Daisy Diamond
- 2008 – Himlens Hjärta (Heaven's Heart)
- 2009 – Kärlekens Krigare (Warriors of Love)
- 2011 – Magi i Luften (Love Is In The Air)
- 2013 – Miraklet (The Miracle)
- 2014 – Jørgen Leth - Fem Undersøgelser (Jørgen Leth: Five Studies)

== Theatre ==
- 2014 – Hjertet Skælver (The Heart Trembles), Aarhus Teater, Aarhus.
- 2015 – Det Der eR (DDR), Husets Teater, Copenhagen.

== Poetry and novels ==
- 2022 – Natten er en kiste af sort ild (The Night Is a Coffin of Black Fire), Cris & Guldmann.
- 2024 – Sho'ah 1-3, Ptyx Editions.
