= Love Is in the Air (2011 film) =

2011 film

- Directed by: Simon Staho
- Written by: Simon Staho; Peter Birro
- Produced by: Jonas Frederiksen
- Starring: Emma Sehested Høeg
- Cinematography: Sebastian Winterø
- Release date: 23 June 2011
- Running time: 90 minutes
- Country: Denmark
- Language: Danish

Love Is in the Air (Danish: Magi i luften) is a 2011 Danish musical film directed by Simon Staho.

== Plot summary ==
During one summer night in Copenhagen, four teenagers—Lina, Daniel, Therese, and Stefan—confront the confusion of first love and identity. Daniel is in love with Lina, but she is infatuated with a pop star. Therese plans to sleep with Stefan, unaware that he is struggling with feelings for Daniel. Over the course of a single night filled with music, parties, and emotional revelations, their friendships and expectations unravel. By morning, each faces the bittersweet reality of growing up and discovering who they truly are.

== Cast ==
- Emma Sehested Høeg as Lina
- Gustav Hintze as Daniel
- Victoria Carmen Sonne as Therese
- Anton Honik as Stefan (as Honik)
- Laust Sonne as Niklas Ravn
- Dar Salim as Benny
- Henning Valin Jakobsen as Stefans far (as Henning Valin)
- Mette Frank as Stefans mor
- Birgitte Hjort Sørensen as Niklas Ravns kæreste
- Claus Gerving as Daniels far
