= In the Blood (2016 film) =

2016 film

- Film poster
- Directed by: Rasmus Heisterberg
- Written by: Rasmus Heisterberg
- Starring: Victoria Carmen Sonne
- Cinematography: Niels Thastum
- Distributed by: Scanbox Entertainment
- Release dates: 10 September 2016 (TIFF); 15 September 2016 (Denmark)
- Running time: 114 minutes
- Country: Denmark
- Language: Danish

In the Blood (Danish: I blodet) is a 2016 Danish drama film directed by Rasmus Heisterberg. It was selected to be screened in the Discovery section at the 2016 Toronto International Film Festival. At the 2017 Bodil Awards, it won Best Film and Victoria Carmen Sonne won Best Supporting Actress.

== Cast ==
- Victoria Carmen Sonne as Emilie
- Mads Reuther as Esben
- Elliott Crosset Hove as Knud
- Esben Dalgaard Andersen as Rune
- Kristoffer Bech as Simon
- Aske Bang as Søren
- Trine Runge as Overlæge
