= Brave New Love =

2026 film by Maria Bäck

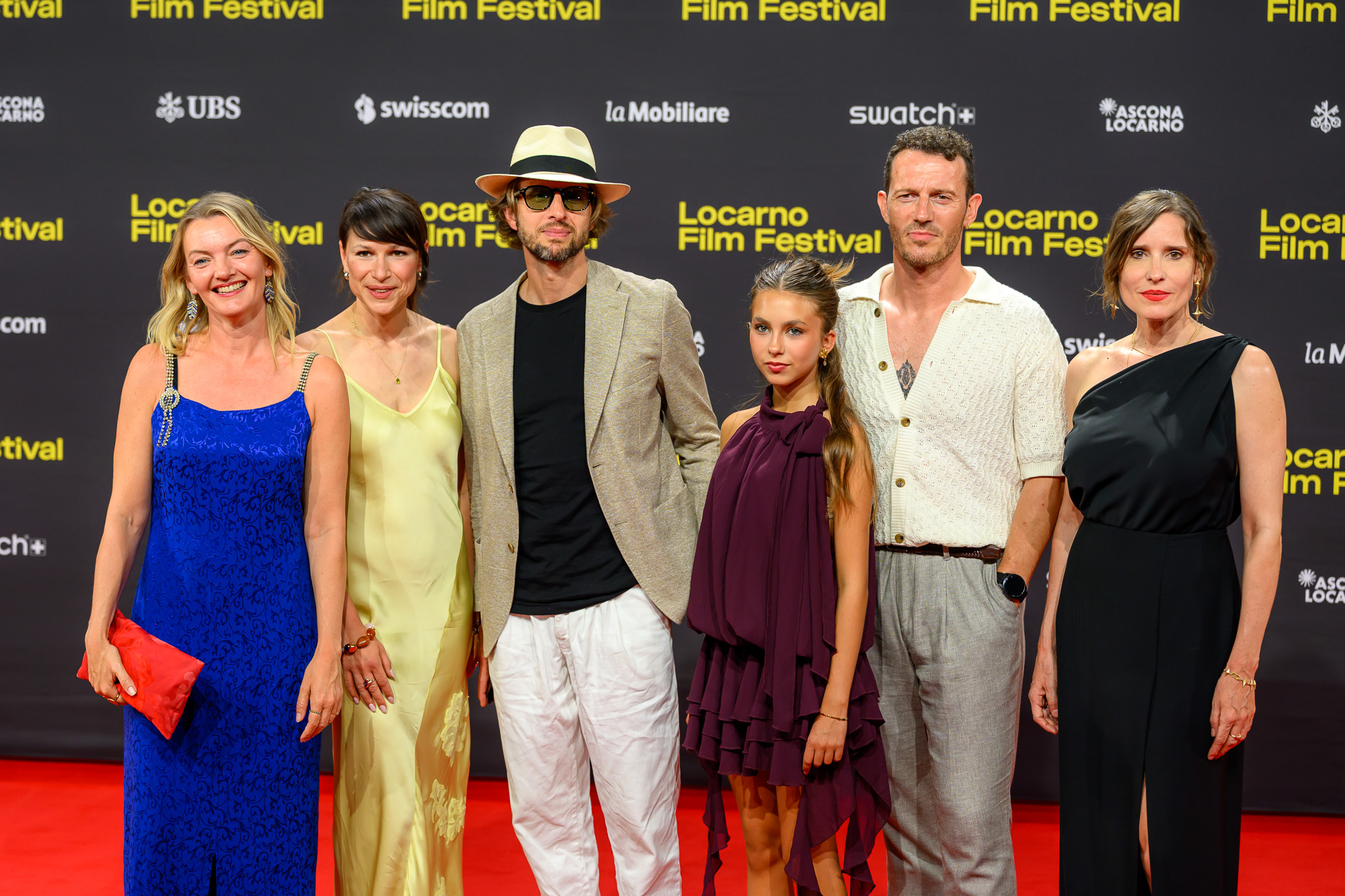
- Brave New Love Cast at 79th Locarno Film Festival in 2026
- Directed by: Maria Bäck
- Written by: Maria Bäck
- Produced by: Anna-Maria Kantarius
- Starring: Kathrine Thorborg Johansen; Anders Danielsen Lie; Simon Sears; Noemi Carbone Mannov; Angeliki Papoulia
- Cinematography: Maria von Hausswolff
- Edited by: Julius Krebs Damsbo
- Music by: Jenny Hval
- Production company: Snowglobe
- Release date: 9 August 2026 (Locarno)
- Running time: 105 minutes
- Countries: Denmark; Sweden; Greece
- Languages: Danish; Norwegian; Greek

Brave New Love is a 2026 romantic drama film written and directed by Maria Bäck. An international co-production between Denmark, Sweden, and Greece, it stars Kathrine Thorborg Johansen, Anders Danielsen Lie, Simon Sears, Noemi Carbone Mannov, and Angeliki Papoulia.

The film had its world premiere at the main competition of the 79th Locarno Film Festival on 9 August 2026, where it competed for the Golden Leopard.

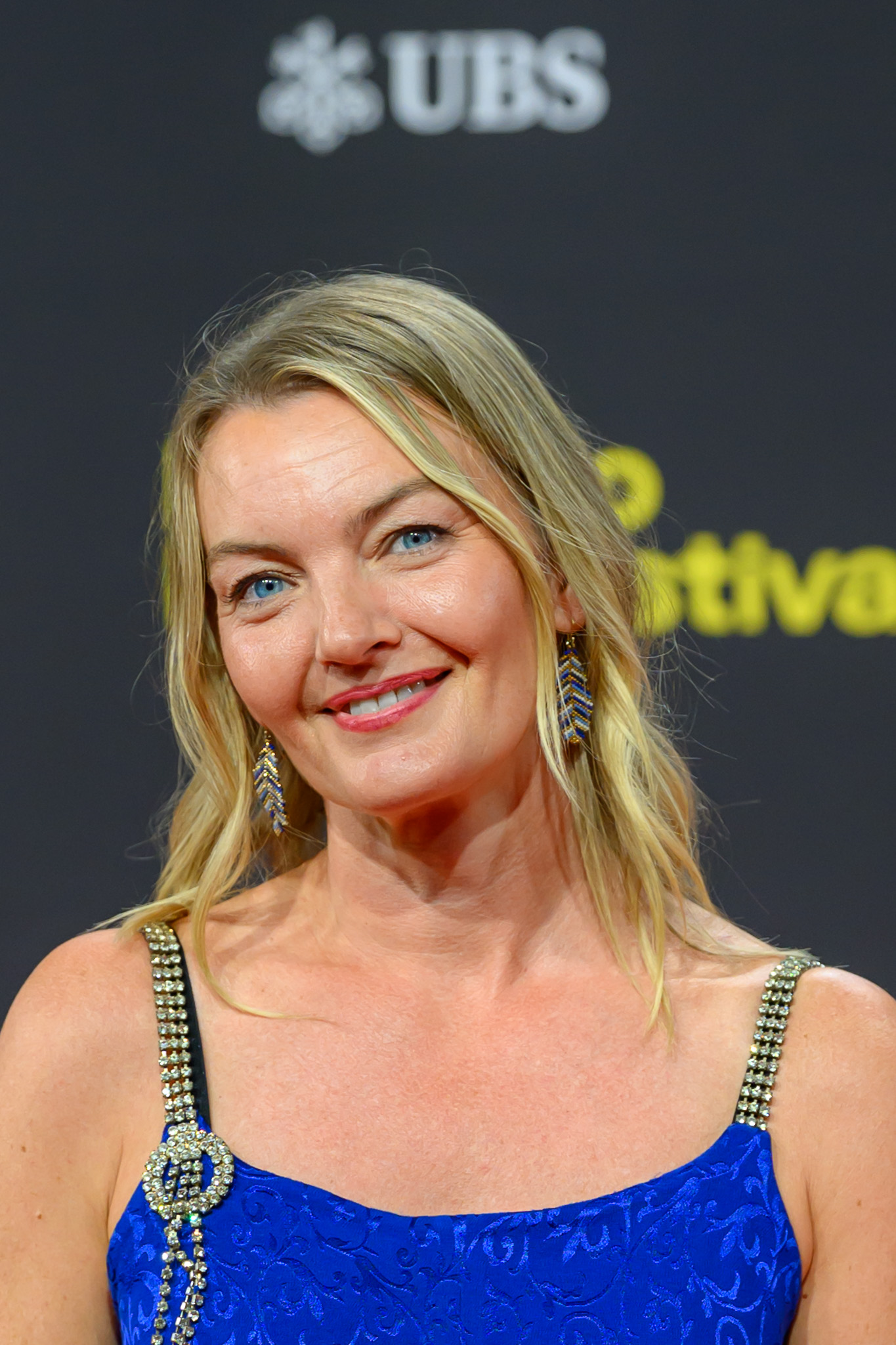
Director Maria Bäck in 2026 at 79th Locarno Film Festival

== Premise ==
A hypnotherapist leads a double life by maintaining a secret relationship with another man while living with her husband and daughter.

== Cast ==
- Kathrine Thorborg Johansen as Kate
- Anders Danielsen Lie as Andreas
- Simon Sears as Orla
- Noemi Carbone Mannov as Athena
- Angeliki Papoulia

== Production ==
In February 2025, it was reported that Maria Bäck would direct a second feature film Brave New Love, starring Kathrine Thorborg Johansen, Anders Danielsen Lie, Simon Sears, and Angeliki Papoulia. It was also announced that REinvent had acquired the film's international sales.

Principal photography began in March 2025 in Aarhus, Denmark, and Samos, Greece.

== Release ==
Brave New Love had its world premiere at the 79th Locarno Film Festival on 9 August 2026, competing for the Golden Leopard.
