= Olena Rozvadovska =

Ukrainian children's rights advocate

- Олена Розвадовська
- Awards: BBC 100 Women (2023)

Olena Petrivna "Lena" Rozvadovska (Ukrainian: Олена Петрівна Розвадовська) is a Ukrainian children's rights advocate.

== Early life and career ==
Rozvadovska grew up in western Ukraine.

Until 2015, Rozvadovska worked in Kyiv as a consultant for UNICEF and for the Ukraine President's Office as a public advocate for children's rights.

== Activism ==
In 2015, after the Russian annexation of Crimea, Rozvadovska quit her jobs, moved to Slovyansk, and became a volunteer working to support children and their families in the "gray zone" of Ukraine, including Donbas. As a volunteer, she was unaffiliated with any religious or secular organizations, although she often collaborated with larger organizations. Her work included landmine education for children.

In 2019, Rozvadovska founded Voices of Children with filmmaker Azad Safarov. Safarov was filming the documentary A House Made of Splinters at the time, and Rozvadovska was a local coordinator for the documentary while it was filming in Lysychansk. The organization provides psychological support to children affected by Ukraine's conflicts with Russia, and supports creative programs allowing for children to express and process their emotions.

Following Russia's invasion of Ukraine in February 2022, Rozvadovska and her colleagues moved to Lviv Oblast, and continued providing services remotely while trying to organize aid for families fleeing the region. In 2023, Voices of Children had about 100 psychologists in 14 centres across Ukraine.

In 2023, Rozvadovska published War through the Voices of Children.

== Recognition ==
In 2023, Rozvadovska was named to the BBC's 100 Women list. She was one of the three Ukrainian women included in the list together with writer Oksana Zabuzhko and climate activist Iryna Stavchuk.
