= Olsen Gang Gets Polished =

2010 Danish animated comedy film

- Theatrical release poster
- Danish: Olsen-banden på de bonede gulve
- Directed by: Jørgen Lerdam
- Screenplay by: Nikolaj Peyk
- Produced by: Tomas Radoor; Thomas Heinesen
- Edited by: Per Riisager
- Music by: Henrik Lindstrand; Bent Fabricius-Bjerre; Jeppe Kaas
- Production companies: A. Film Production; Nordisk Film
- Distributed by: Nordisk Film Distribution
- Release date: 14 October 2010
- Running time: 78 minutes
- Country: Denmark
- Language: Danish
- Box office: $4,794,857

Olsen Gang Gets Polished (Danish: Olsen-banden på de bonede gulve) is a 2010 Danish animated comedy film directed by Jørgen Lerdam from a screenplay by Nikolaj Peyk. Produced by A. Film Production and Nordisk Film, it was the first animated film in the Olsen Gang film series. Olsen Gang Gets Polished was released on 14 October 2010. It was followed in 2013 by The Olsen Gang in Deep Trouble.

== Voice cast ==
- Martin Buch as Egon Olsen
- Nicolaj Kopernikus as Benny Frandsen
- Esben Pretzmann as Kjeld Jensen
- Annette Heick as Yvonne Jensen
- Simon Jul Jørgensen as Allan
- Mick Øgendahl as Johnny
- Søren Sätter-Lassen as Hallandsen
- Anders Matthesen as Detective Assistant Jensen
- Jonas Schmidt as Detective Holm
- Henrik Lykkegaard as Prime Minister Anders Fogh Rasmussen
- Michael Carøe as the estate agent
- Henrik Koefoed as member of parliament and prince consort
- Vicki Berlin as DF speaker
- Andreas Bo Pedersen as the opposition's speaker and Minister of Education
- Jørgen Lerdam as the Queen
- Kaja Kamuk as Ms. Jeppesen
- Rune Tolsgaard as Mr. Jeppesen
- Lin Kun Wu as the President of China
- Zhao Li as the Chinese interpreter
- Jens Jacob Tychsen as the chef
- Silas Addington as Wonder Burger employee
- Peter Oliver Hansen as TV presenter

== See also ==
- Olsenbanden Jr.
