= Herrens Veje =

Danish drama television series

- Genre: Drama
- Created by: Adam Price
- Written by: Adam Price; Karina Dam; Paul Berg
- Starring: Lars Mikkelsen; Ann Eleonora Jørgensen; Simon Sears; Morten Hee Andersen
- Country of origin: Denmark
- Original language: Danish
- No. of seasons: 2
- No. of episodes: 20

Production
- Running time: 60 min
- Production companies: DR Drama; ARTE France; SAM le Français

Original release
- Network: DR1
- Release: September 24, 2017 – December 15, 2018

Herrens Veje (English: The Lord's Ways), entitled Ride Upon the Storm in the English-language subtitled version, is a 2017 Danish drama television series created by Adam Price, produced by Camilla Hammerich and starring Lars Mikkelsen.

== Synopsis ==
The story centres on a family of priests that traces its roots in the Church of Denmark (the Danish national church) back more than 250 years.

Johannes (Lars Mikkelsen) is a senior priest and Area Dean, married to Elisabeth (Ann Eleonora Jørgensen). The first episode follows Johannes (with the support of his staff and family) through the election process for the new Bishop of Copenhagen. Johannes, a traditionalist candidate, is narrowly beaten by the progressive female candidate in the final round of the election. Many subsequent themes are predicated upon Johannes's disappointment and frustration at his failure to become the first bishop in the clerical family.

The couple have two sons, August (Morten Hee Andersen), and Kristian (Simon Sears). August is also a priest, serving in a Copenhagen suburban parish church, and as a military chaplain in the Royal Danish Army. Kristian also trained for ordination as a priest, but dropped out of his seminary in his final year. Kristian, whose behaviour can be reckless, and often a disappointment to his father, is found in the first episode completing an academic dissertation, at which he is discovered to have cheated.

Johannes is God-like to his sons – he gives, loves, and punishes. His favouritism for August and his disappointment with Kristian forces both into making desperate choices in order either to gain his love or to break free from him. Their path will lead us into war and encounters between different religions, seen through the intimate lens of a family drama.

== Cast ==
=== Main ===
- Lars Mikkelsen as Johannes Krogh
- Ann Eleonora Jørgensen as Elisabeth Krogh
- Simon Sears as Kristian Krogh
- Morten Hee Andersen as August Krogh

=== Recurring ===
- Fanny Louise Bernth as Emilie
- Yngvild Støen Grotmol as Liv
- Camilla Lau as Amira
- Joen Højerslev as Svend
- Laura Bro as Monica Ravn
- Patricia Schumann as Ursula
- Mathias Flint as Simon Andreasen
- Maj-Britt Mathiesen as Lotte
- Johanne Dal-Lewkovitch as Naja
- Solbjørg Højfeldt as Nete
- Joachim Fjesltrup as Mark
- Lars Ranthe as Daniel
- Hadi Ka-koush as Walid

== Accolades ==
Year	Award	Category	Nominee(s)	Result
2018	46th International Emmy Awards	Best Performance by an Actor	Lars Mikkelsen	Won

== See also ==
- List of Danish television series
