= Daisy Diamond =

2007 Danish film

- Directed by: Simon Staho
- Written by: Simon Staho; Peter Asmussen
- Starring: Noomi Rapace
- Release date: 23 November 2007
- Running time: 94 minutes
- Country: Denmark
- Languages: Danish, Swedish, English
- Budget: $1 million

Daisy Diamond is a 2007 Danish film starring Noomi Rapace, directed by Simon Staho and co-written by him and Peter Asmussen.

== Plot ==
Dark and tragic, the story revolves around 22 year old Anna, a girl from a wealthy family, who is also fiercely ambitious and dreams of one thing only: making it as an actress. One day, Anna decides to pack her bags and leave, without telling her mother or father. She moves from Sweden to Copenhagen to pursue her dream. However, when she gets to the city, fate has something else in store for her. Anna discovers she will soon become a mother. Later, after giving birth to baby girl, she tries to chase after her dream, once again. Undoubtedly talented, she has one problem – being the single mother of a now 4-month-old baby. Though she struggles to give her daughter a good start in life, she ultimately fails to unite her dream of acting with a safe and loving environment for her child. Having to take her baby with her to auditions, the child's crying results in Anna not getting a part. Torn between her duties as a mother, and her passion for acting and the need to earn money, Anna is driven to the limits of her patience - with tragic consequences: she drowns her baby in a bathtub. What follows is a downward spiral: she begins working as a prostitute, and under the stage name 'Daisy Diamond', she acts in porn movies. In the end, she finally lands a role, and as part of that role, she plunges into a bathtub.

== Cast ==
- Noomi Rapace as Anna
- Thure Lindhardt as Casting actor
- Benedikte Hansen as Instructor 1
- Morten Kirkskov as Instructor's assistant 1
- Trine Dyrholm as Eva
- Dejan Čukić as Bettina
- Sofie Gråbøl as Actress
- Christian Tafdrup as Thomas Lund
- David Dencik as Jens
- Jens Albinus as Kunde
- Thomas Voss as Actor in a porno film (uncredited)
- Lotte Andersen as Instructor 2
- Lærke Winther Andersen as Instructor 3
- Amelie Thomesen as Daisy
- Sofie Pedersen Munkholm as Daisy

== Reception ==
Jonathan Holland of Variety said that "[t]he first five minutes of Daisy Diamond feature a smack injection and a rape, [after which], things only get bleaker".

Despite a negative review from Variety, the film was selected for the main competition at the San Sebastián International Film Festival and Rapace won acclaim for her portrayal of troubled teen mother Anna. According to the same publication, "Rapace delivers a superbly committed performance in a demanding role, the actress having to expose herself physically and emotionally". She won the two top film awards in Denmark (the Bodil and Robert prize) for Best Actress for her role in the film.

Trine Dyrholm was also nominated for both the Bodil and Robert awards for her supporting role as Eva.

The film did receive criticism for the supposed abuse occurring to a baby actor during production.
