= Iryna Stavchuk =

Ukrainian climate policy advisor

- Born: c.1982
- Education: Igor Sikorsky Kyiv Polytechnic Institute; International Institute for Industrial Environmental Economics
- Occupations: Minister, activist

Iryna Ivanivna Stavchuk (Ukrainian: Ірина Іванівна Ставчук) is a Ukrainian writer, ex deputy minister and climate policy advisor. She was recognized as one of the BBC 100 Women in 2023.

== Life ==
Stavchuk was born in about 1982.

Stavchuk's education included studying Ecological and Economic Monitoring at the Igor Sikorsky Kyiv Polytechnic Institute in Kyic. After she graduated she went to Sweden where she took a post-graduate course in Ecology Management and Policy at the International Institute for Industrial Environmental Economics.

She began work at the National Environmental Center of Ukraine where she worked on climate related policies. She was helping to organise Ukraine's response to climate change and she worked with the United Nations with their negotiations concerning climate for over a decade.

In 2008 the World Bank established a Clean Technology Fund. Stavchuk has served on that fund's board of directors.

In 2017 she was working at the Center for Environmental Initiatives (Ecoaction) which she had co-founded. In 2019 she left being Ecoaction's Executive Director to become a Deputy Minister in Ukraine. She was responsible for climate issues until 2022. She noted that people's lives were being given priority after the Russian invasion but there was environmental damage too. Water treatment plants were damaged leaving sewage untreated in rivers. Bombing of industrial areas created air and land pollution. As the "deputy minister of environmental protection and natural resources of Ukraine for European integration" she tried to ensure that all of these were monitored.

Stavchik joined the European Climate Foundation where she is making plans for post-war recovery that are compatible with climate change. In 2023 she was one of the three Ukrainian women included in the list of BBC 100 Women together with writer Oksana Zabuzhko and charity founder Olena Rozvadovska.
