= A Caretaker's Tale =

2012 Danish film

- Theatrical poster
- Directed by: Katrine Wiedemann
- Screenplay by: Kim Fupz Aakeson
- Produced by: Ib Tardini
- Starring: Lars Mikkelsen; Nicolaj Kopernikus; Julie Zangenberg; Peter Plaugborg
- Cinematography: Lars Reinholdt
- Music by: Kristian Eidnes Andersen
- Release date: 25 October 2012
- Running time: 85 minutes
- Country: Denmark
- Language: Danish

A Caretaker's Tale (Danish: Viceværten) is a 2012 Danish drama film directed by theatre director Katrine Wiedemann based on a screenplay by Kim Fupz Aakeson.

== Plot ==
Per (Lars Mikkelsen) is a bitter misogynist caretaker (building manager). His wife left him, his son is a drug addict, and his back hurts. In his spare time, he drinks beer with neighbour Viborg (Nicolaj Kopernikus). Then he suddenly finds a mysterious naked young woman (Julie Zangenberg) in an empty apartment. Per doesn't know what to do with the girl who is unable to talk, walk, or eat. The only thing she does is smile mysteriously. Then Per and his friends discover her special gift.

== Cast ==
- Lars Mikkelsen as Per
- Nicolaj Kopernikus as Viborg
- Julie Zangenberg as The Girl
- Peter Plaugborg as Carsten
- Tommy Kenter as Gregers
- Ditte Gråbøl as Britt
