= Simon Sears =

Danish actor (born 1984)

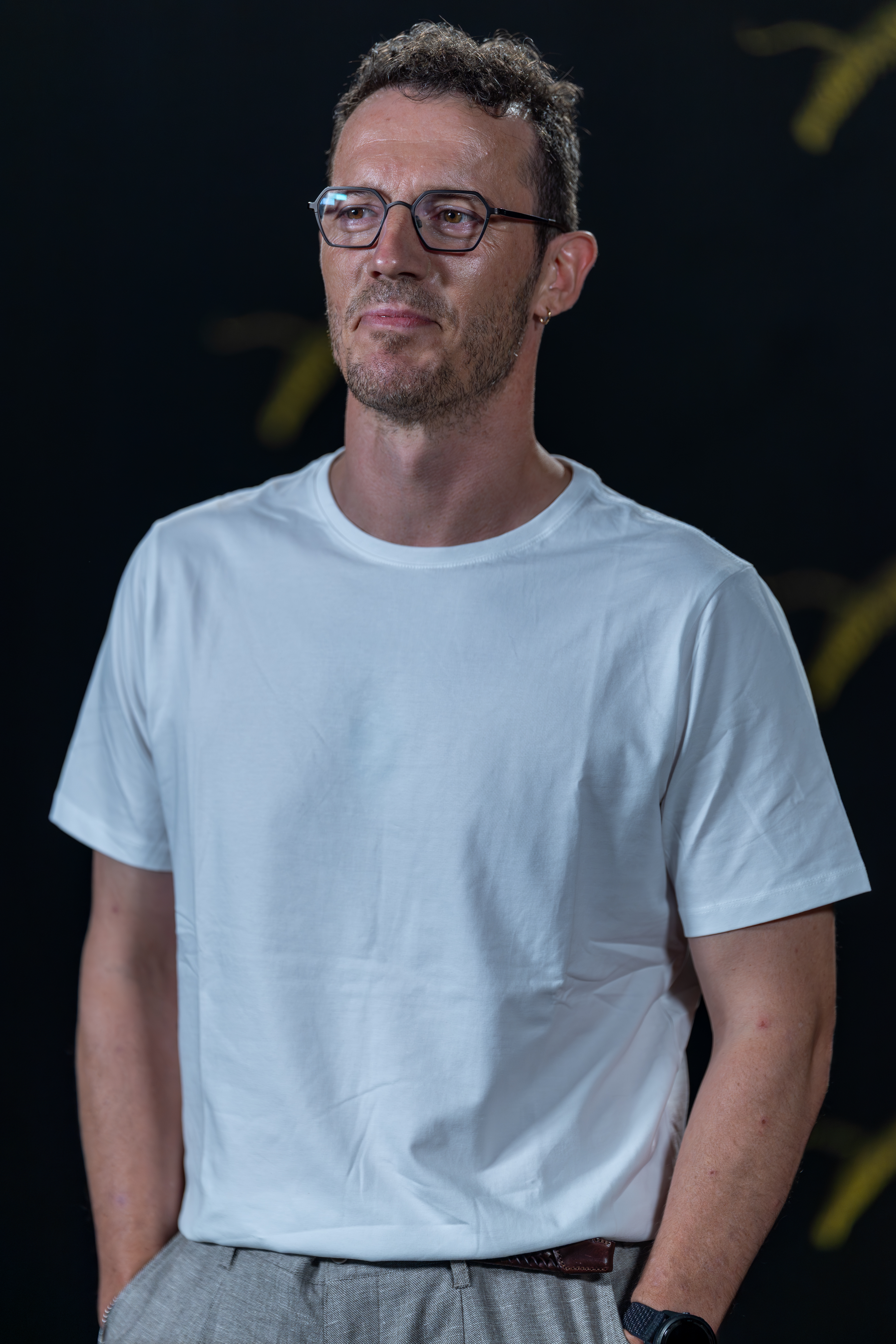
- Sears in 2026
- Born: 25 January 1984 (age 42); Roskilde, Denmark
- Education: Danish National School of Performing Arts
- Occupation: Actor
- Years active: 2009–present
- Children: 3

Simon Sears (born 25 January 1984) is a Danish actor.

== Early life and education ==
Sears was born in Roskilde to an Italian father and Danish mother. He was raised in the town of Solrød Strand, and has two older siblings.

When he was younger, Sears was interested in dance, training at the Solrød Centre and performing at Bella Centeret and dance championships. As his father grew up financially unstable due to his grandfather being a painter, Sears explored a few careers options before settling on theatre. He briefly moved to Hjørring before going on to train at the Danish National School of Performing Arts in Copenhagen, graduating in 2014.

== Career ==
In 2015, Sears had stage roles in Koks i kulissen, Cabaret, and Ødipus Laboratoriet at the Royal Danish Theatre and Visen om sidsel at Grønnegårds Teatret. He starred in his first feature-length film 9. April alongside Pilou Asbæk. The following year, he received the prestigious Reumert Talent Prize for his role in the 2016 production of Sidst på dagen er vi alle mennesker at the Betty Nansen Teatret with company Mammutteatret. He made his television debut with a recurring role in DR series Follow the Money (Danish: Bedrag).

Sears starred in 2017 film Winter Brothers (Danish: Vinterbrødre), earning him nominations at the Bodil Awards and Robert Awards. He began starring in the main role of Christian in DR series Ride Upon the Storm (Danish: Herrens Veje), a role for which he is a two-time Robert Award for Best Actor in a Supporting Television Role nominee. He also won best actor at the Italian Digital Fiction Festival.

Sears starred in the 2020 Danish thriller Shorta. In October 2019, it was announced he would play Ivan in the Netflix series Shadow and Bone, an adaptation of overlapping fantasy book series Shadow and Bone and Six of Crows by Leigh Bardugo. The series premiered in 2021.

== Personal life ==
Sears lives in Copenhagen with his Icelandic wife, Ingibjörg Skúladóttir, and their two sons. Their first son, Skúli Leví, was born the same day Sears won his Reumert Prize in 2016. Their second was born in 2019.

== Filmography ==
=== Film ===
Year	Title	Role	Notes
2009	Northern Lights	Simon	Short film
2015	April 9th (Danish: 9. april)	Kaptajn Holm	
2017	Winter Brothers (Danish: Vinterbrødre)	Johan	
2019	The Exception (Danish: Undtagelsen)	Rasmus	Based on Christian Jungersen's 2004 novel
2020	Enforcement (Danish: Shorta)	Jens Høyer	
2026	Brave New Love	Orla	

=== Television ===
Year	Title	Role	Notes
2016	Follow the Money (Danish: Bedrag)	Tobias	3 episodes
2017–present	Ride Upon the Storm (Danish: Herrens Veje)	Christian Krogh	Main role
2021	Shadow and Bone	Ivan	7 episodes; recurring role
2022-24	Baby Fever	Matthias	12 episodes
2022	The Kingdom		1 episode
2023-24	Those Who Kill (Danish: Den Som Dræber)	Frederik Havgaard	16 episodes
2025	Secrets We Keep (Danish: Reservatet)	Mike	6 episodes

== Stage ==
Year	Title	Role	Notes
2015	Koks i kulissen	Tim Ruth Nielsen	Production manager; Royal Danish Theatre
2015	Cabaret	Bob, Toldbetjent / Ensemble	Royal Danish Theatre
2015	Ødipus Laboratoriet		Royal Danish Theatre
2015	Visen om sidsel	Jens Albrekt, Petter	Grønnegårds Teatret
2016	Sidst på dagen er vi alle mennesker		Betty Nansen Teatret

== Awards and nominations ==
Year	Award	Category	Work	Result
2016	Reumert Prize	Reumert Talent Prize	Sidst på dagen er vi alle mennesker	Won
2018	Bodil Awards	Best Actor in a Supporting Role	Vinterbrødre	Nominated
2018	Robert Awards	Best Actor in a Supporting Role	Vinterbrødre	Nominated
2018	Robert Awards	Best Actor in a Supporting Television Role	Herrens Veje	Nominated
2019	Robert Awards	Best Actor in a Supporting Television Role	Herrens Veje	Nominated
2019	Digital Fiction Festival	Best Actor	Herrens Veje	Won
