= Bang Bang Orangutang =

- Poster
- Directed by: Simon Staho
- Starring: Mikael Persbrandt; Tuva Novotny; Lena Olin
- Release date: September 2005 (San Sebastian Film Festival)
- Running time: 106 minutes
- Countries: Sweden; Denmark
- Languages: Swedish; English

Bang Bang Orangutang is a 2005 Swedish drama film directed by Danish director Simon Staho starring Mikael Persbrandt, Tuva Novotny, Lena Olin, Fares Fares, Jonas Karlsson, Reine Brynolfsson and many other popular Swedish actors.
