= Miss Osaka =

2022 film by Daniel Dencik

- Directed by: Daniel Dencik
- Written by: Daniel Dencik; Sara Isabella Jønsson; Jønsson Vedde
- Produced by: Michael Haslund-Christensen
- Starring: Victoria Carmen Sonne; Nagisa Morimoto; Mirai Moriyama; Kaho Minami; Junko Abe
- Cinematography: Aske Foss
- Edited by: Jenna Mangulad; Olivia Neergaard-Holm
- Music by: Johan Carøe; Kwamie Liv; Yasuaki Shimizu
- Distributed by: Culture Publishers
- Release dates: 9 September 2021 (Denmark); 21 October 2022 (Japan)
- Running time: 90 minutes
- Countries: Denmark; Norway; Japan
- Languages: Danish; Norwegian; Japanese

Miss Osaka (Japanese: ミス・オオサカ, Hepburn: Misu Ōsaka) is a 2021 drama film directed by Daniel Dencik and stars Victoria Carmen Sonne. The film is set in Norway and Japan, and follows a Danish woman searching for her own identity who leaves her whole life behind after meeting a Japanese woman in Northern Norway. She embarks on a journey to Osaka, which is filled of mystery, danger and seduction.

== Plot ==
Ines, a young Danish woman who aimlessly followed her boyfriend Lucas on a business trip to Northern Norway. At a hotel restaurant, she met Maria, an enigmatic and seductive Japanese woman. She said she was there to see the aurora. Ines was fascinated by her and asked what she did, she told that she worked in a club, a place where you could be who you wanted to be, where you could be free, a place for dreamers, a paradise.

Ines and Maria became close and went for a drive. They spent an unforgettable night under the aurora. Drunk Ines fell asleep in the car parked on the cold riverside, and before she knew it, Maria has been gone. Only red shoes were left on the waterside. Ines realized that Maria was dead.

Ines flew to Japan with Maria's passport and plane ticket. She then moved into Maria's apartment in Sakai City. Using Maria's business card with "Miss Osaka Mimi-ko" printed on it, she visited the night club "Miss Osaka" located in downtown Osaka, learning that Mimi-ko was the most popular hostess there. She was hired with a professional name, April.

It was a place where men came to have pseudo love affairs. As she diligently learned Japanese and mastered the manners of a hostess, she began to receive more and more nominations. There was a regular customer named Shigeo, who was highly esteemed. They said that Mimi-ko was the only one who could get him. Ines boldly approached him and arranged to go to a Keirin. It was her first time, but Ines won big. Shigeo was obsessed with Mimi-ko, but gradually became attracted to Ines.

Finally Ines became Sigeo's "woman". At the same time, she could no longer keep what had happened to her and Maria in Norway a secret. When Sigeo heard the story, he strongly rejected Ines. Ayano, a colleague at the club, also began to suspect Ines' true identity. Ines quit the club, left Maria's apartment to avoid being seen, and moved to a capsule hotel. At the same time, Maria's body was found in Norway.

== Cast ==
- Victoria Carmen Sonne as Ines/Apiril
- Nagisa Morimoto as Maria/Mimi-ko
- Mirai Moriyama as Shigeru
- Mikkel Boe Følsgaard as Lucas
- Kaho Minami as Mama-san
- Junko Abe as Ayano
