= Second Half =

- Directed by: Hilde Heier
- Written by: Kim Fupz Aakeson
- Starring: Johannes Joner; Espen Reboli Bjerke; Baard Owe
- Release date: 19 January 2007
- Running time: 84 minutes
- Country: Norway
- Language: Norwegian

Second Half (Norwegian: Andre omgang) is a 2007 Norwegian comedy film directed by Hilde Heier, starring Johannes Joner, Espen Reboli Bjerke and Baard Owe. The two brothers Erik (Bjerke) and Sverre (Joner) are both experiencing relationship problems, while their father (Owe) has to place his wife in a retirement home after she develops Alzheimer. Every Sunday the three meet to watch their favourite club, Skeid, play football. However, there is fear that they may get relegated this year.
