= Lars Mikkelsen =

Danish actor (born 1964)

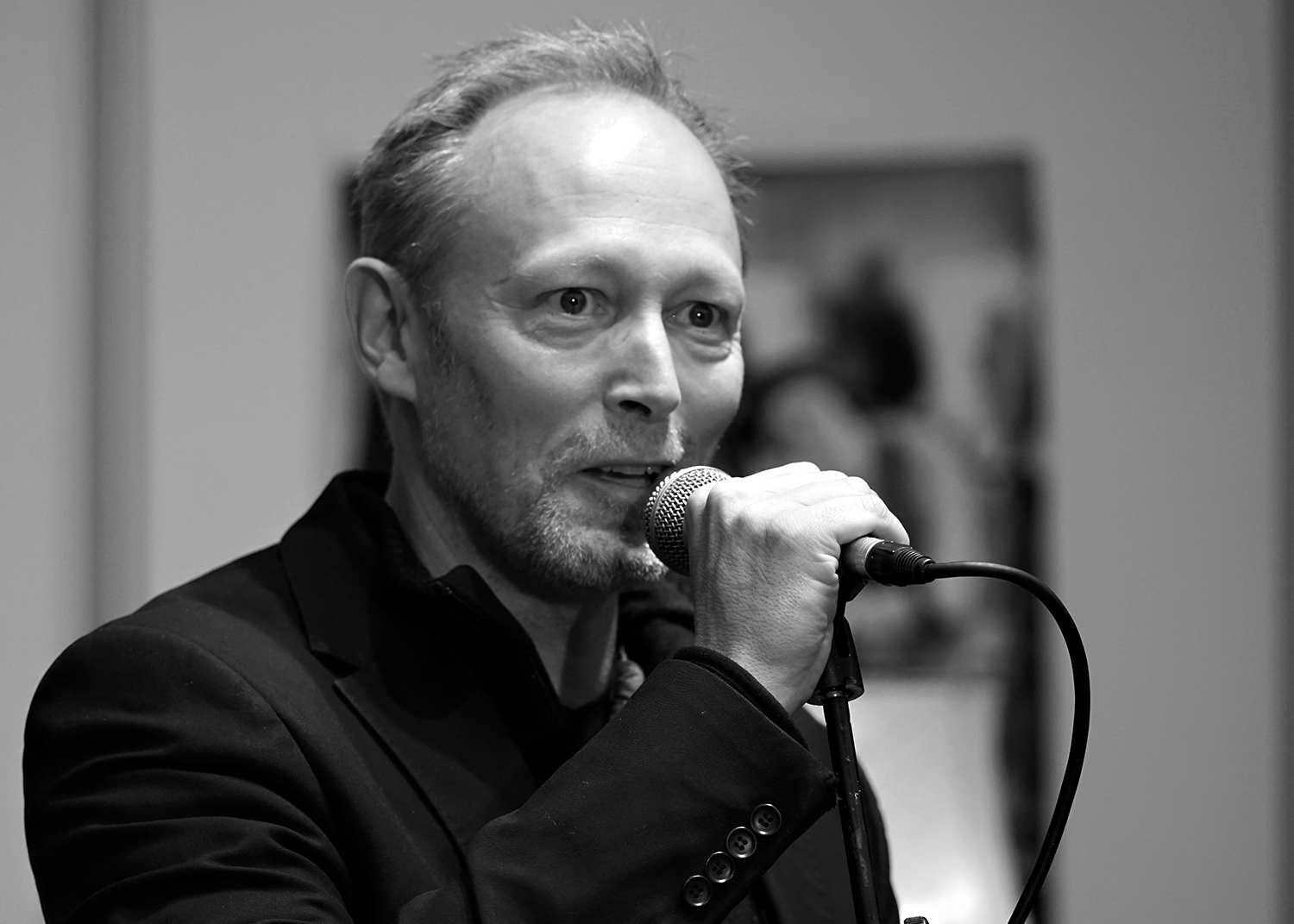
- Mikkelsen in 2015
- Born: Lars Dittmann Mikkelsen; 6 May 1964 (age 62); Copenhagen, Denmark
- Occupations: Actor; voice actor
- Known for: The Killing; House of Cards; Borgen; Sherlock; Grand Admiral Thrawn: • Star Wars Rebels; • Ahsoka; • Star Wars: Tales of the Empire
- Spouse: Anette Støvelbæk (m. 1989)
- Children: 2
- Relatives: Mads Mikkelsen (brother)

Lars Dittmann Mikkelsen (Danish: [ˈlɑːs ˈme̝kl̩sn̩]; born 6 May 1964) is a Danish actor. He is known for his roles as Copenhagen mayoral election candidate Troels Hartmann in the Danish police procedural The Killing, the character Charles Augustus Magnussen in the third series of the BBC programme Sherlock, fictional Russian president Viktor Petrov in the American political thriller TV series House of Cards, mage Stregobor on the Netflix series The Witcher, and Grand Admiral Thrawn in Star Wars Rebels and Ahsoka. In 2011, he won the Reumert Prize of Honour for his contributions to Danish theatre.

== Early life ==
Mikkelsen was born in Gladsaxe near Copenhagen. He and his younger brother, fellow actor Mads Mikkelsen, were raised in the Nørrebro district. After secondary school, he enlisted for military service in the Royal Danish Army. He then studied biology at the University of Copenhagen but gave up the course to earn his living as a street performer in European cities with his mime and juggling acts.

== Career ==
At the age of 27, Mikkelsen enrolled at the National Theatre School of Denmark from which he graduated in 1995. In addition to his role in the drama series released worldwide as The Killing, he subsequently appeared in two other internationally acclaimed Danish drama series, Those Who Kill and Borgen III. He also had a leading role in an episode of the BBC drama Sherlock as blackmailer Charles Augustus Magnussen. In the American television series House of Cards, he played the president of Russia. He won an International Emmy Award in 2018 for his role in Danish television drama Herrens Veje, which was broadcast in the UK in 2019 as Ride Upon the Storm. From 2016 to 2018, he voiced Grand Admiral Mitth'raw'nuruodo "Thrawn" in the third and fourth seasons of the animated series Star Wars Rebels. He reprised the role in the 2023 live-action Disney+ series Ahsoka and the 2024 anthology series Star Wars: Tales of the Empire.

In addition to his native Danish, Mikkelsen speaks fluent Swedish, German and English, and he has mastered various accents. He has stated that he and his brother first picked up English by listening to Monty Python records and learning the comedy sketches.

== Personal life ==
Mikkelsen is married to actress Anette Støvelbæk. They have been a couple since 1986 and married in 1989. They have two sons. He is the older brother of actor Mads Mikkelsen.

While filming the second season of Ride Upon the Storm, he went to see a priest and asked to be baptised into the National Church of Denmark.

== Filmography ==
=== Film ===
Year	Title	Role	Notes	Ref.
1997	Royal Blues	Henning		
1999	Seth	Seth		
1999	Under overfladen	Victor		
2000	Kira's Reason: A Love Story (En kærlighedshistorie)	Mads		
2004	King's Game (Kongekabale)	Peter Schou		
2005	Nordkraft	Steso's father		
2007	Island of Lost Souls	Necromancer		
2007	Cecilie	Lasse N. Damgaard		
2008	What No One Knows (Det som ingen ved)	Marc Deleuran		
2008	Flame & Citron (Flammen & Citronen)	Frode Jacobsen aka Ravnen		
2009	Flugten	Thomas Jargil		
2009	Headhunter	Martin Vinge	Robert Award for Best Actor in a Leading Role	
2012	What Richard Did	Peter Karlsen		
2012	A Caretaker's Tale	Per		
2014	Montana	Dimitrije		
2014	When Animals Dream	Thor		
2015	9. April	Lieutenant-Colonel Hintz		
2016	The Day Will Come	Frederik Heck		
2017	Winter Brothers	Carl		
2021	The Venus Effect	Klaus		
2022	The Kiss	Løvenskjold		
2023	Asfalt	Kim		
2025	Frankenstein	Captain Anderson		
TBA	Dalloway	TBA	Post-production	

=== Television ===
Year	Title	Role	Notes	Ref.
1997	Strisser på Samsø	Jens Fiskrt	Episodes 1–4, 6	
1997	Taxa	Drug addict	Episode 8	
2000	Edderkoppen	Ole Madsen		
2000	Skjulte spor	Morten Theilgaard		
2001	Langt fra Las Vegas	Pirate captain		
2001	Nikolaj og Julie	Per Køller	Episodes 10–20	
2002	Rejseholdet	Ivan	Episodes 21–22	
2004–2007	Krøniken	Jens Otto Krag	Episodes 2–3, 9, 11, 14–15, 17, 21–22	
2007	Forbrydelsen	Troels Hartmann	20 episodes	
2011	Those Who Kill	Magnus Bisgaard		
2013, 2022	Borgen	Søren Ravn	Seasons 3 and 4	
2014	Sherlock	Charles Augustus Magnussen	Series 3; 2 episodes	
2014	1864	Thøger Jensen	Episodes 1–2	
2015	The Team	Harold Bjørn	8 episodes	
2015–2018	House of Cards	Viktor Petrov	Seasons 3–6; 11 episodes	
2016	Der Kommer En Dag	Forstander Frederick Heck	Season 1	
2017	Historien om Danmark	Narrator		
2017	Herrens Veje	Johannes	International Emmy for Best Performance by an Actor	
2019–present	The Witcher	Stregobor	6 episodes	
2019–2023	Face to Face	Holger Lang	9 episodes	
2020–2022	Devils	Daniel Duval	16 episodes	
2021	Seaside Hotel	Svend Damm	5 episodes	
2022	The Kingdom	Pontopidan	5 episodes	
2022	The Dreamer – Becoming Karen Blixen	Knud	6 episodes	
2023–present	Star Wars: Ahsoka	Grand Admiral Thrawn	3 episodes Nominated—Critics' Choice Super Award for Best Villain in a Series	

=== Animated films/series/shorts ===
Year	Title	Role	Notes	Ref.
2002	Naruto	Zabuza Momochi, Hayate Gekkō	Danish dub	
2004	Tiger-brødre	Aidan McRory		
2006	Arthur and the Invisibles	Malthazar	Danish dub	
2006	The Wild	Samson	Danish dub	
2007	Go West! A Lucky Luke Adventure	Lucky Luke		
2007	Meet the Robinsons	Uncle Art	Danish dub	
2009	Monsters vs. Aliens	General O.K. MacMission		
2010	Huset Anubis	Hr. Van Swieten		
2011	Ronal the Barbarian	Volcazar	Danish dub	
2014	The Dam Keeper	The Narrator	Short	
2016–2018	Star Wars Rebels	Grand Admiral Thrawn	17 episodes	
2024	Star Wars: Tales of the Empire	Grand Admiral Thrawn	Episode: "The Path of Anger"	

== See also ==
- List of International Emmy Award winners
