= Daniel Dencik =

Danish writer and film director

Daniel Dencik (born 1972) is a Danish writer and film director. He has published a dozen books, ranging from short stories and essays to poetry as well as four novels.

He has studied Philosophy at Stockholm University, where he wrote his thesis about the existentialism of Kierkegaard. He graduated as a film editor from the National Film School of Denmark. In 1998, he had his first book of poetry published by Gyldendal. His work has been divided between film and literature ever since.

At a young age he edited several shorter films and commercials for Lars von Trier, and he is the editor of the cult movie Nói albinói (2003) by Dagur Kari.

He has been writing essays on subjects ranging from the sport of professional cycling to the meaning of solitude and religion. He has covered Tour de France for the Danish daily paper Politiken, and for the magazine Euroman.

As of 2012, he has also been directing films, most notably the documentary Expedition To The End of The World. In 2012 he received The Reel Talent Award at CPH:DOX. His portrait of the painter Tal R entitled Tal R: The Virgin won a Danish Academy Award 2014 for best short documentary.

2015 marked his debut in narrative films with the historical drama, Gold Coast. The film revolves around the Europe's colonial past in West Africa. It was shot on locations in Ghana and Burkina Faso and stars Jakob Oftebro and Danica Curcic. The soundtrack is composed by Angelo Badalamenti. It was a Danish-Ghanaian co-production with a budget of €2 million.

Gold Coast had its international premiere at the Karlovy Vary Film Festival.

He has received the biggest talent award in Danish film, the prestigious Nordisk Film Award.

His controversial novel Anden person ental (2014) was praised by the critics and the focus of a lot of attention in the Danish press. In 2016 he published a collection af short stories titled Grand Danois (2016). This work was nominated for Book of the Year in Denmark. A story from the book was published by World Literature Today.

His later books have been translated into German, Dutch, and Swedish.

== Personal life ==
Daniel Dencik is married to Sofie Linsaa Dencik, with whom he has two daughters. He lives without a phone in a rural home in the forest outside Helsingør when he is in Denmark. He had his phone stolen by “a clever Moroccan” in Toulouse in 2017 and never got a new one. He wrote on the occasion: “I can highly recommend my Arab thief.” When his latest collection of short stories was published in 2026, it also emerged that he “has stopped making big feature films because it is a huge and unnecessary environmental waste.”

== Filmography ==
- Moon Rider (2012) - documentary following bicycle racer Rasmus Quaade
- Expedition To The End of The World (2013) - documentary on a journey to the North of Greenland where scientists and artists are confronted with the rapid melting ice in the world's largest fjord system
- Tal R: The Virgin (2013) - short documentary
- Gold Coast (2015) - fiction feature
- The Vanishing Act (2019) - short documentary
- The Butler (2019) - short documentary
- Miss Osaka (2021) - fiction feature
