= Olena Nepochatenko =

Ukrainian agricultural economist and academic administrator

Olena Oleksandrivna Nepochatenko (Ukrainian: Непочатенко Олена Олександрівна) is a Ukrainian agricultural economist and academic administrator. She is the rector of Uman National University of Horticulture since 2013. Nepochatenko specializes the study of lending to agricultural enterprises, taxation of agricultural producers, loans, and agricultural leasing. She holds of the title of Honored Worker of Education of Ukraine and was awarded the Excellence in Education of Ukraine Badge, third class.
