= Øst for Paradis =

Art cinema in Denmark

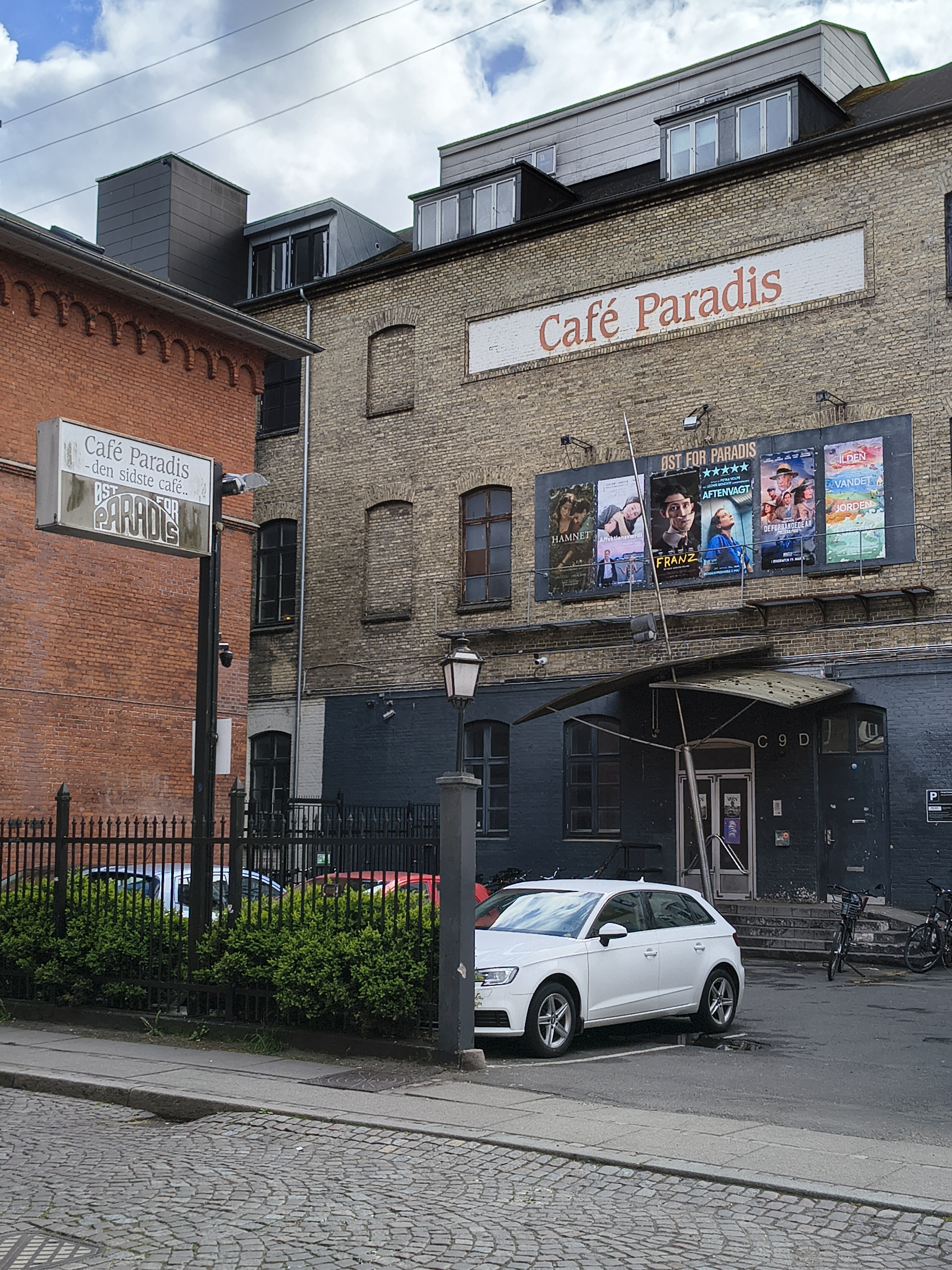
- Interactive map of Øst for Paradis
- Address: Paradisgade 7–9, 8000 Aarhus C, Denmark
- Coordinates: 56°9′35.63″N 10°12′34.53″E
- Type: Cinema
- Screens: 7

Website
- www.paradisbio.dk

Øst for Paradis (East of Eden) is an art cinema in Aarhus, Denmark founded in 1978.

== History ==
Øst for Paradis was founded November 28, 1978 by John Rosendorff, Flemming W. Larsen, and Uffe Sloth Andersen as they were of the opinion that Aarhus lacked a cinema that screened niche movies and movies from other countries than the United States and the closest neighbouring European countries.

The name of the cinema, Øst for Paradis, derives from the Danish title of the 1955 film East of Eden. East of Eden was also the first movie screened upon opening the cinema in 1978, and the name is furthermore claimed to represent the cinema's goal to screen movies from Eastern Europe and Third World countries that other cinemas to not usually screen.
