= Voices of Children =

Ukrainian non-profit organisation

- Голоси дітей
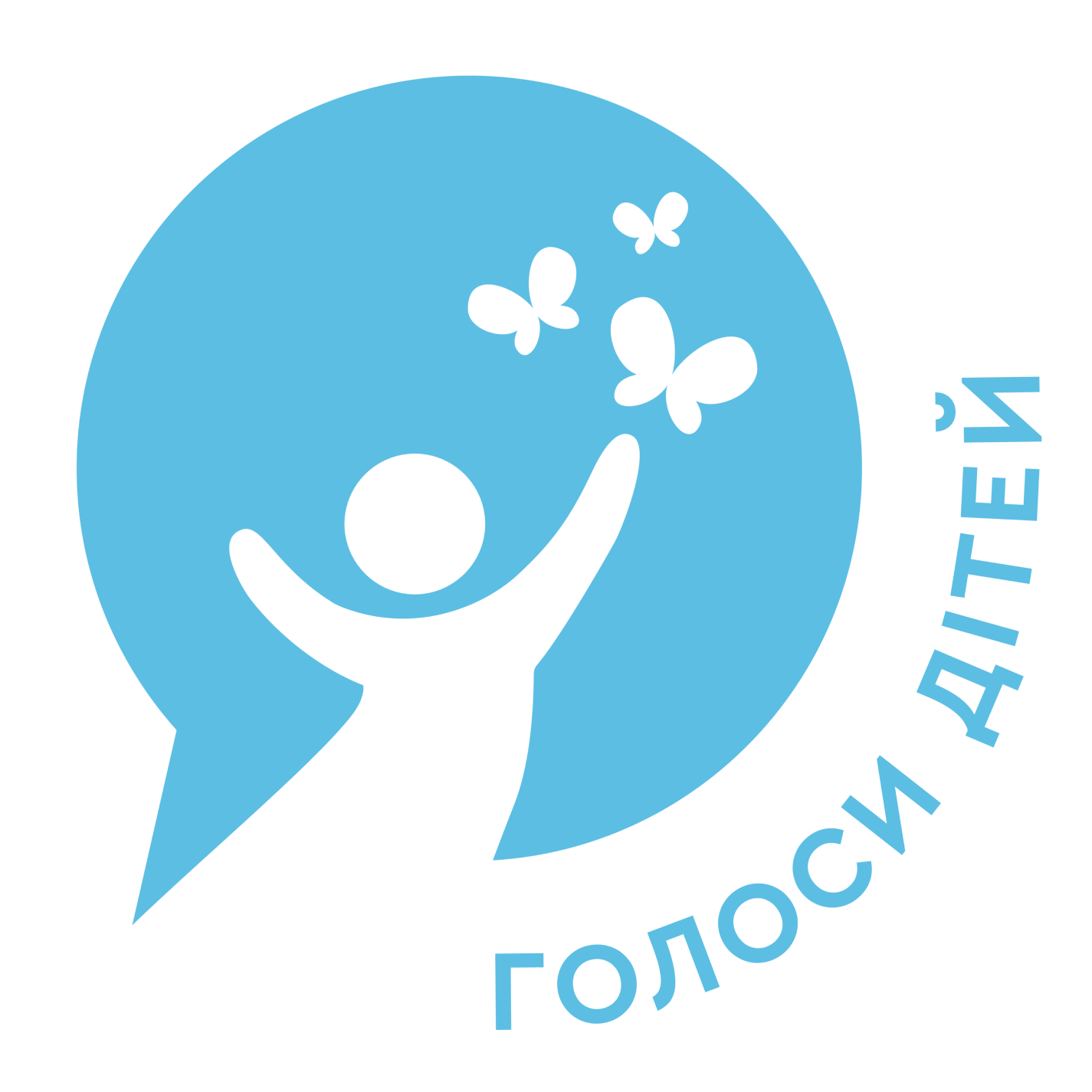
- Formation: 2019
- Founders: Olena Rozvadovska; Azad Safarov
- Type: Charity
- Chair: Olena Rozvadovska
- Website: voices.org.ua/en

Voices of Children (Ukrainian: Голоси дітей, Holossy ditej) is a charitable non-profit organisation in Ukraine. Active since 2015 and officially registered in 2019, the foundation provides support to children and families affected by war and advocates for the rights and interests of children.

The foundation's three main focuses are: psychological and psychosocial support; individual humanitarian assistance to families; and advocacy for children's rights.

== History ==
The foundation was formally registered in 2019 by children's rights activist Olena Rozvadovska and journalist and filmmaker Azad Safarov.

As of March 2023, the foundation operates 14 local centres and runs a free psychological support hotline. A team of more than a hundred psychologists, psychotherapists, leisure specialists, lawyers and coordinators provides services to children across various regions of Ukraine.

== Achievements ==
According to the foundation's own reports for 2022, the foundation assisted more than 42,000 children and adults. Reported figures include:

- Qualified psychological assistance to 4,700 children and 1,872 adults;
- Humanitarian assistance to over 13,000 families;
- Rehabilitation support for 224 children with disabilities;
- Approximately 4,000 individual and group psychological sessions with children and parents;
- More than 600 psychosocial activities for children.

On 1 March 2023, the foundation presented its annual monitoring report on war crimes against children in Ukraine at the OSCE headquarters in Vienna. Fifty‑five diplomats from 40 OSCE participating States attended the briefing. Since the start of the full-scale invasion the foundation has been among the first NGOs to produce monthly monitoring reports documenting Russian war crimes against Ukrainian children.

In early April 2022, Forbes listed the foundation among the top ten most effective charitable organisations in Ukraine; the foundation reportedly raised UAH 68.3 million for victims of the war.

The feature documentary A House Made of Splinters, produced by entities from Ukraine, Denmark, Sweden and Finland and made in cooperation with the foundation, was an Academy Award nominee for Best Documentary Feature. The foundation is also a member of the International Network of Organisations and Individuals Eurochild and, in 2022, joined the International Expert Council of the Office of the Prosecutor General of Ukraine. At the end of 2022, the foundation received an award from the Commissioner for Human Rights in recognition of its systematic human rights work.
