= The Distant Barking of Dogs =

2017 film by Simon Lereng Wilmont

- Film poster
- Danish: Olegs krig
- Directed by: Simon Lereng Wilmont
- Produced by: Monica Hellström; Tobias Janson; Sami Jahnukainen
- Starring: Oleg Afanasyev; Alexandra Ryabichkina; Jarik
- Edited by: Michael Aaglund
- Music by: Uno Helmersson; Erik Enocksson
- Production companies: Final Cut for Real; Story AB; Mouka Filmi Oy
- Distributed by: Cinephil
- Release date: November 19, 2017 (IDFA)
- Running time: 90 minutes
- Countries: Denmark; Ukraine
- Languages: Russian, Ukrainian
- Budget: €489,000

The Distant Barking of Dogs (Danish: Olegs krig) is a 2017 documentary film produced by Monica Hellström, and directed by Simon Lereng Wilmont. The film, set in Hnutove near Mariupol, follows the life of 10-year-old Ukrainian boy Oleg throughout a year during the War in Donbas. Through Oleg's perspective, the film examines what it means to grow up in a war zone.

The film premiered at the 2017 International Documentary Festival Amsterdam, where it won the IDFA Competition for First Appearance.

The family documented in the film subsequently fled following the full-scale Russian invasion in 2022.

== Synopsis ==
The film is set in Eastern Ukraine on the frontline of the war. The film follows the life of 10-year-old Ukrainian boy Oleg (Oleh) throughout a year, witnessing the gradual erosion of his innocence beneath the pressures of war. Oleg lives with his beloved grandmother, Alexandra (Oleksandra), in the small village of Hnutove, Donetsk Oblast. Having no other place to go, Oleg and Alexandra stay and watch as others leave the village. Life becomes increasingly difficult with each passing day, and the war offers no end in sight.

== Cast ==
- Oleg Afanasyev
- Alexandra Ryabichkina
- Jarik

=== Critical response ===
On the review aggregator Rotten Tomatoes, the film holds an approval rating of 93% based on 14 reviews.

=== Awards ===
The Distant Barking of Dogs won a Peabody Award in the Documentary category. It was 1 of 15 films shortlisted for the 2019 91st Academy Awards in the Documentary Feature category. The documentary won the award of 2017 International Documentary Film Festival Amsterdam for Best First Appearance. It was also among five nominations for the best documentary at 2018 31st European Film Awards. In January 2019 The Distant Barking of Dogs won the prize of the Cinema Eye Honors.
