= Peter Plaugborg =

Danish actor (born 1980)

- Born: 12 April 1980 (age 46); Ribe, Denmark
- Occupation: Actor
- Years active: 2008-present

Peter Plaugborg (born 12 April 1980) is a Danish actor.

== Filmography ==
Year	Title	Role	Notes
2008	Flammen & Citronen	Lillebjørn	
2008	The Candidate	Den Tynde Mand	
2009	Velsignelsen	Kim	
2009	Broderskab	Sergent	
2010	Submarino	Martins far	
2010	Freedom on Parole	Originalen	
2012	A Caretaker's Tale	Carsten	
2013	The Keeper of Lost Causes	Lars Henrik 'Lasse' Jensen	
2013	Miraklet	Johannas mand	
2014	1864	Sergent Jespersen	6 episodes
2015	I dine hænder	Niels	
2015	The Idealist	Poul Brink	
2015	The Shamer's Daughter	Drakan	
2017	Winter Brothers	Daniel	
2017	Den utrolige historie om den kæmpestore pære	Viceborgmester Kvist	Voice
2018	A Fortunate Man		
2018	Kursk	Alexander Grekov (Executive Officer Kursk)	
2018	Christian IV	King's royal physician	
2019	Harpiks	Jens	
