= Nicolaj Kopernikus =

Danish film and TV actor (born 1967)

- Born: Nicolaj Kopernikus; 9 August 1967 (age 58); Glostrup, Denmark
- Occupation: Singer
- Spouse: Leo Jensen
- Children: 3

Nicolaj Kopernikus (born Nicolaj Christiansen, 9 August 1967 in Glostrup) is a Danish actor most famous for his portrayal of Vagn Skærbæk in the first series of the crime drama series The Killing. Kopernikus won a Bodil Award for Best Actor in a Supporting Role for his role in The Bench.

== Selected filmography ==
Film
Year	Title	Role	Notes
2000	The Bench	Stig	
2004	In Your Hands	Henrik	
2005	Dark Horse		
2010	Olsen Gang Gets Polished	Benny Frandsen	
2011	The Reunion	Niels	
2012	A Caretaker's Tale	Viborg	

TV
Year	Title	Role	Notes
2007	The Killing	Vagn Skærbæk	Series 1
2011	The Bridge	Ole	Series 1 episode 2
2014	Midsomer Murders	Thomas Madsen	Series 16 episode 5 (The Killings of Copenhagen)
