= A House Made of Splinters =

2022 documentary film by Simon Lereng Wilmont

- Official poster
- Ukrainian: Будинок із трісок
- Directed by: Simon Lereng Wilmont
- Screenplay by: Simon Lereng Wilmont
- Produced by: Monica Hellström
- Cinematography: Simon Lereng Wilmont
- Edited by: Michael Aaglund; Marion Tuor
- Music by: Uno Helmersson
- Production company: Final Cut for Real
- Distributed by: Cinephil; Giant Pictures
- Release date: January 26, 2022 (Sundance)
- Running time: 87 minutes
- Countries: Denmark; Ukraine; Sweden; Finland
- Languages: Ukrainian; Russian

A House Made of Splinters (Ukrainian: «Будинок із трісок», romanized: Budynok iz trisok, Danish: Et hus af splinter, Russian: «Дом из осколков», romanized: Dom is oskolkov) is a 2022 documentary film by the Danish film director Simon Lereng Wilmont, created with the support of the State Agency of Ukraine for Film Affairs. An international co-production with Denmark, Ukraine, Sweden and Finland, it follows the story of children from a special orphanage in eastern Ukraine.

The film had its world premiere at the 2022 Sundance Film Festival on 26 January 2022, where it won the best director award in the World Cinema Documentary section. The film also won the international competition Golden Alexander Award for best film as well as the FIPRESCI Award at the 24th Thessaloniki Documentary Festival in March 2022.

It was selected for Best Documentary Feature and subsequently shortlisted from 144 eligible to 15 films and then nominated for 95th Academy Awards in the said category.

== Content ==
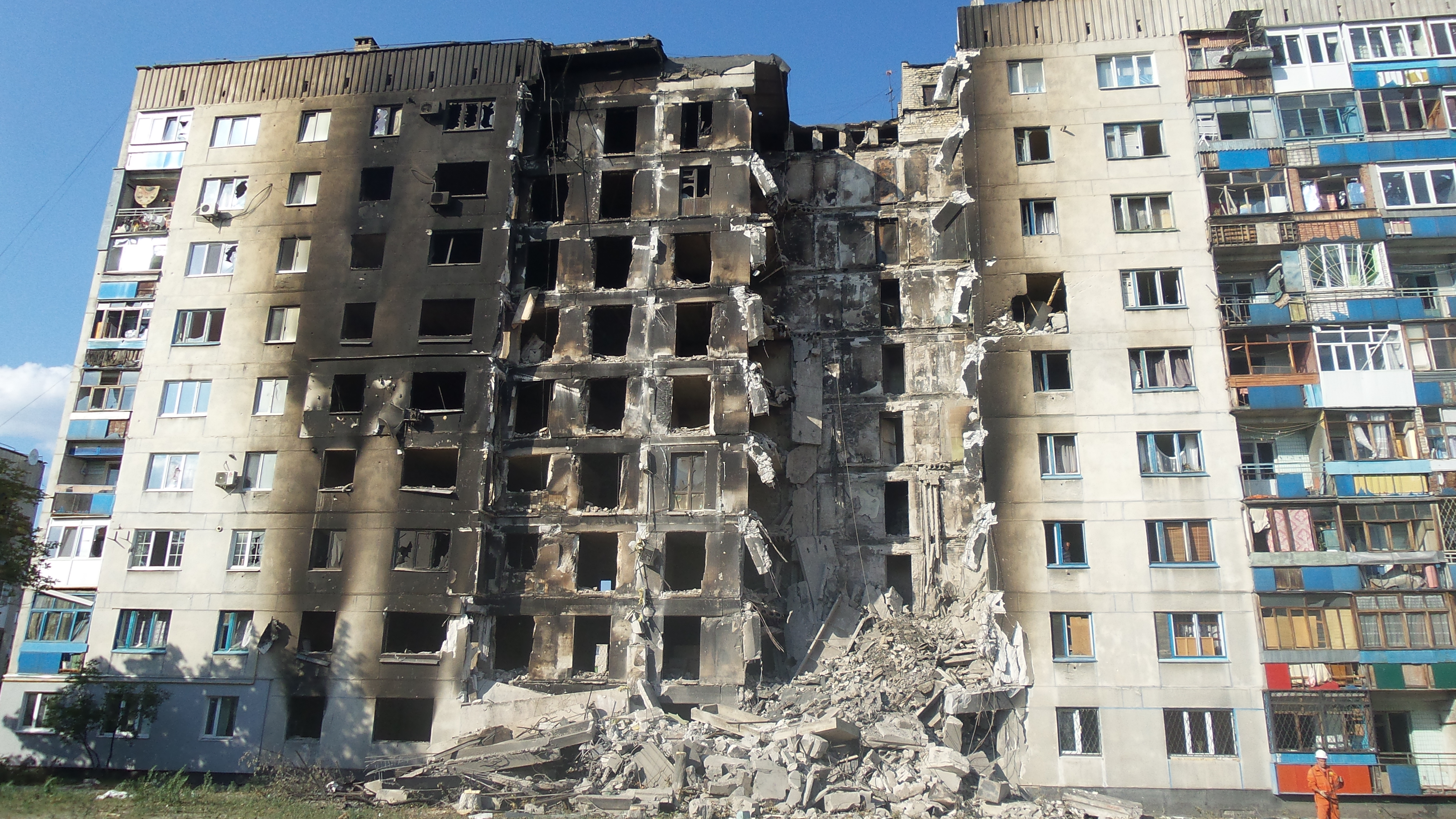
Social workers have tried to create a safe environment for the children in the war-torn city of Lysychansk

The war in eastern Ukraine took a heavy toll, especially on the poor families living near the front lines. The film presents the stories of children from a special orphanage in Lysychansk in eastern Ukraine. A small group of social workers is taking care of children who have been temporarily removed from their parents and are waiting for custody decisions. The heroes of the film were also several educators who, in the conditions of the war with Russia, are trying to create a safe space for children near the front line. While children are being cared for, adult children are in danger, until the state authorities and courts decide the further fate of children.

== Production ==
The filming of the documentary lasted for more than two years in Donbas. It was created in the co-production of Sweden, Finland, Denmark and Ukraine with the support of the State Agency of Ukraine for Film Affairs.

== Release ==
The film had its world premiere at the 2022 Sundance Film Festival on 26 January 2022.

It was invited at the Gothenburg International Film Festival held from 27 January to 5 February 2022, and at the 24th Thessaloniki Documentary Festival held from 10 March to 20 March 2022, where it won Golden Alexander Award-Best Film as well as the FIPRESCI Award. Later it was screened at CPH:DOX, the Copenhagen International Documentary Film Festival held from March 23 to April 3, 2022.

In April 2022, it was screened at the Swiss documentary film festival Visions du Réel and then at the 29th edition of Hot Docs Canadian International Documentary Festival. In May 2022, it was presented at DOK.fest Munich and at the Israeli documentary film festival Docaviv. In June 2022, it was screened at the Sydney Film Festival. In July, it was selected at the 19th edition of the Golden Apricot Yerevan International Film Festival held from 10 to 17 July, in the 'International Full-Length Competition'. In September, the film featured in the Competition Program of AJB DOC held from 9 to 13 September. In October 2022, it was presented at the Semana Internacional de Cine de Valladolid and at the Osnabrück Film Festival and on 3 November 2022 at the Lübeck Nordic Film Days. In November 2022 it was also presented in the Standpoint section of 33rd Singapore International Film Festival.

On January 17, 2023, American Documentary reported that POV (a cinema term for “point of view”) had acquired the film and it will make its national broadcast premiere on PBS, American Experience, as part of POV's 36th season launching summer 2023.

On February 14, 2023, it was reported by Deadline that Giant Pictures had acquired US theatrical and VOD rights to the film and as of March 7, 2023, it was released on digital platforms in USA including Apple TV+, Amazon Prime Video and it is also running at select Alamo Drafthouse locations around USA.

== Reception ==
On the review aggregator website Rotten Tomatoes, the film has a 97% approval rating based on reviews from 39 critics, with an average rating of 7.8/10. The site's critics consensus reads: "Taking a brilliantly unobtrusive approach, A House Made of Splinters uncovers heartbreak and hope while observing the generational effects of war." On Metacritic, it has a weighted average score of 79 out of 100 based on 10 reviews, indicating "generally favorable reviews".

=== Critical response ===
Jack Seale reviewing for The Guardian rated the film with 4 stars out of 5 and wrote, "Full of almost intolerably cold, hard truths about what happens to little ones when society is fractured." Daniel Fienberg of Hollywood Reporter admiring the moments of beauty wrote, "I admired the moments of beauty that Wilmont delivers in a film that isn’t quite consistent enough in its storytelling approach." Concluding Fienberg opined, "Even if A House Made of Splinters can't completely decide if it wants to tell a story or the repetition of devastation and ephemeral uplift is enough, the faces here linger long after the movie ends." Guy Lodge reviewing for Variety praised the cinematography of the film, writing, "Lereng Wilmont’s filmmaking [is] marked by unusual tenderness and human interest, shot with a camera that feels all but invisible to its subjects". Concluding, Lodge stated, "A House Made of Splinters indulges in passages of visual poetry — light dancing on enraptured faces, two children’s silhouettes tracing the patterns on a backlit voile curtain," he added, "– that feel earned, granting breathing space and beauty to an environment that needs them most."

Elena Lazic wrote in Cineuropa, that the film "offers a window into [reality of life in Eastern Ukraine] through a temporary house for children who cannot be looked after by their parents". In concluding paragraph, Lazic rued that the film, "does not provide any groundbreaking ideas on the cycles of addiction, violence and neglect," next giving positive aspects of the film, she added, "but it does show what a difference even a flickering ray of hope can make in the lives of children."

The New York Times honored the film by assigning it with the prestigious 'Critic's Pick' and reviewing it Nicolas Rapold wrote "A House Made of Splinters is made with such aching sensitivity that it’s a marvel a camera was used and not some form of mind-meld".

== Accolades ==
Award	Date of ceremony	Category	Recipient(s)	Result	Ref.
Sundance Film Festival	30 January 2022	Best director – World Cinema Documentary Competition	Simon Lereng Wilmont	Won	
Göteborg International Film Festival	5 February 2022	Dragon Award Best Nordic Documentary	A House Made of Splinters	Won	
Thessaloniki Documentary Festival	20 March 2022	Golden Alexander Award	A House Made of Splinters	Won	
Thessaloniki Documentary Festival	20 March 2022	FIPRESCI Award	A House Made of Splinters	Won	
One World Film Festival	2 April 2022	International Competition Jury Award for the Best Film	A House Made of Splinters	Won	
Copenhagen International Documentary Film Festival	3 April 2022	Politiken:DOX Award	A House Made of Splinters	Won	
ZagrebDox	10 April 2022	Movies That Matter Competition (main prize)	A House Made of Splinters	Won	
European Film Awards	10 December 2022	European Documentary	A House Made of Splinters	Nominated	
IDA Documentary Awards	10 December 2022	Best Documentary	A House Made of Splinters	Nominated	
IDA Documentary Awards	10 December 2022	Best Director	Simon Lereng Wilmont	Nominated	
IDA Documentary Awards	10 December 2022	Best Cinematography	Simon Lereng Wilmont	Nominated	
Cinema Eye Honors	12 January 2023	Outstanding Production	Monica Hellström	Nominated	
Cinema Eye Honors	12 January 2023	Outstanding Cinematography	Simon Lereng Wilmont	Nominated	
Robert Award	4 February 2023	Best Documentary Feature	A House Made of Splinters	Won	
Robert Award	4 February 2023	Best Sound design	Heikki Kossi and Peter Albrechtsen	Nominated	
Robert Award	4 February 2023	Best Score	Uno Helmersson	Nominated	
Independent Spirit Awards	4 March 2023	Best Documentary Feature	A House Made of Splinters	Nominated	
Academy Awards	12 March 2023	Best Documentary Feature	A House Made of Splinters	Nominated	
