= The Olsen Gang in Jutland =

- Poster by Aage Lundvald
- Directed by: Erik Balling
- Written by: Henning Bahs; Erik Balling
- Produced by: Bo Christensen
- Starring: Ove Sprogøe; Morten Grunwald; Poul Bundgaard
- Cinematography: Jørgen Skov
- Edited by: Ole Steen Nielsen
- Music by: Bent Fabricius-Bjerre
- Distributed by: Nordisk Film
- Release date: 8 October 1971
- Running time: 101 minutes
- Country: Denmark
- Language: Danish

The Olsen Gang in Jutland (Danish: Olsen-banden i Jylland) is a 1971 Danish comedy film directed by Erik Balling and starring Ove Sprogøe. The film was the third installment in the Olsen Gang series.

== Plot ==
The film starts like most of the Olsen Gang films, with Egon being released from the State Prison in Vridsløselille. The gang goes back home to Kjeld and Yvonne to discuss their next caper. Unlike most other Olsen Gang films, this heist takes place in Jutland. Egon has obtained a map for a treasure stored in an old German command bunker on the west coast. To get to Jutland they must cross the then newly built Little Belt Bridge, but two other criminals (Helle Virkner and Willy Rathnov) have also got wind of the story. The Olsen Gang does not make it easier for themselves by taking Yvonne along. They mistakenly believe that it will be easy to fool the locals - they misjudge the wily scrap dealer (Karl Stegger) and his mute assistant (Preben Kaas). They soon become much wiser. A bomb left over from the war gives Kjeld a brief, but very significant, shell shock, which causes him to stylishly carry out a terrific ride in a runaway dump. Not surprisingly, a planned Majorca trip gets postponed.

== Cast ==
- Ove Sprogøe as Egon Olsen
- Morten Grunwald as Benny Frandsen
- Poul Bundgaard as Kjeld Jensen
- Kirsten Walther as Yvonne Jensen
- Jes Holtsø as Børge Jensen
- Helle Virkner as Karen
- Willy Rathnov as Rico
- Karl Stegger as Mads 'Penny' Madsen
- Preben Kaas as Small Ass
- Peter Steen as Løjtnanten
- Benny Hansen as Menig '667345'
- Ernst Meyer as Tank Man
- Gunnar Strømvad as Chauffeaur

== Production ==
Most of the film was shot in Vigsø Bugt east of Hanstholm in 1968.
