= The Olsen Gang on the Track =

1975 film

- Film poster by Aage Lundvald
- Directed by: Erik Balling
- Written by: Henning Bahs; Erik Balling
- Produced by: Bo Christensen
- Starring: Ove Sprogøe
- Cinematography: Claus Loof
- Edited by: Ole Steen Nielsen
- Distributed by: Nordisk Film
- Release date: 26 September 1975
- Running time: 105 minutes
- Country: Denmark
- Language: Danish

The Olsen Gang on the Track (Danish: Olsen-banden på sporet) is a 1975 Danish comedy film directed by Erik Balling and starring Ove Sprogøe. The film was the seventh in the Olsen Gang series.

== Plot ==
Following the Olsen Gang's only successful robbery in the previous film, they are seemingly living the perfect life in the basking sun on Mallorca, (Note: Filming however took place in Benalmádena and the Torrequebrada construction site on the Costa del Sol.) but they are not happy. Kjeld is homesick, Yvonne has turned into an alcoholic, and money-wasting Benny is in conflict with Egon who has the red suitcase containing their money always chained to his wrist. Meanwhile, the enforcer Bøffen has tracked them down, and he manages to steal the case. Egon is arrested by the Spanish police as the gang try to retrieve it.

Back in Denmark, after Egon is released from prison, he's got a new plan, as usual. So has Yvonne, however: she has alerted the police about the money which was stolen from them in Spain, and she asks for an advance in return. Egon has memorised the complete Danish train schedules as the money has now been invested in gold bars, which are to be shipped to Zürich by train - in an armored Franz Jäger wagon. The gang steal a small shunting locomotive, hijack the wagon and transfer the gold onto a battered medium truck, which collapses under the load.

The gang has to abandon the gold to escape the police, split up in disagreement, but regroup with a new plan after Benny and Kjeld rescue Egon from "disappearing and staying lost". In the meantime the Danish State Railways has switched to the summer schedule, turning the plan into a lethal task. In addition the police have arranged a summer outing via rail and by chance, Bøffen spots the gang towing the wagon along the Copenhagen harbour railway and a car/train chase along Amagerbanen ensues. Luckily Yvonne has supplied the police with what turns out to be a decisive description of both the perpetrator and the armored wagon and eventually the gang is successful in repossessing the gold and launder it through a Norwegian oil company to acquire the majority stake in the shipping company I.C. Lauritzen, (Note: Name is homage to Danish film critic, Jens Christian Lauritzen, not to be confused with actual shipping company J. Lauritzen A/S.) making Egon chairman of the board. The tax administration do not see the income from Egon's trade appearing in the accounts, and so he ends up behind bars again.

== Cast ==
- Ove Sprogøe as Egon Olsen
- Morten Grunwald as Benny Frandsen
- Poul Bundgaard as Kjeld Jensen
- Kirsten Walther as Yvonne Jensen
- Axel Strøbye as CID Inspector Jensen
- Ole Ernst as CID Constable Holm
- Paul Hagen as Signalman Godfredsen
- Helge Kjærulff-Schmidt as Signalman Brodersen
- Ove Verner Hansen as Bøffen
- Jes Holtsø as Børge Jensen
- Søren Steen as Brian / Bodyguard
- Ernst Meyer as Godsekspeditør i Glostrup
- Poul Thomsen as Godsekspeditør i København
- Pouel Kern as Hundevagt
- Erni Arneson as Miss Hansen, Egon's secretary
- John Hahn-Petersen as Fuldmægtig fra Skattevæsenet
- Alf Andersen as Nordmand
- Jørgen Beck as Brovagt på Langebro
- Kirsten Hansen-Møller as The Policeman in Bathing Shorts' Wife
- Knud Hilding as Engine Driver
- Bertel Lauring as Lorry Driver
- Poul Reichhardt as Chief of Police (cameo appearance)
- Finn Storgaard as The Policeman in Bathing Shorts
