= The Olsen Gang's Big Score =

1972 film

- Poster by Aage Lundvald
- Directed by: Erik Balling
- Written by: Henning Bahs; Erik Balling
- Produced by: Bo Christensen; Hanne Krebs; Jan Lehmann
- Starring: Ove Sprogøe; Morten Grunwald; Poul Bundgaard
- Cinematography: Jørgen Skov
- Edited by: Ole Steen Nielsen
- Distributed by: Nordisk Film
- Release date: 6 October 1972
- Running time: 99 minutes
- Country: Denmark
- Language: Danish

The Olsen Gang's Big Score (Danish: Olsen-bandens store kup) is a 1972 Danish comedy film directed by Erik Balling and starring Ove Sprogøe. The film was the fourth in the Olsen Gang series.

== Cast ==
- Ove Sprogøe as Egon Olsen
- Morten Grunwald as Benny Frandsen
- Poul Bundgaard as Kjeld Jensen
- Kirsten Walther as Yvonne Jensen
- Arthur Jensen as Kongen
- Poul Reichhardt as Knægten
- Jesper Langberg as Mortensen
- Bjørn Watt-Boolsen as Politichefen
- Helle Virkner as Højesteretssagførerens hustru
- Asbjørn Andersen as Højesteretssagfører
- Jes Holtsø as Børge Jensen
- Annika Persson as Sonja
- Gotha Andersen as Bademesteren
- Gert Bastian as Bankchauffør
- Jørgen Beck as Overtjener på hotel
- Edward Fleming as Lufthavnsbetjent
- Poul Glargaard as Pilot
- Poul Gregersen as Bassist
- Børge Møller Grimstrup as Værkfører
- Tage Grønning as 2. violin
- Gunnar Hansen as Kommentator ved fodboldkamp (voice)
- Ove Verner Hansen as Købmanden
- Knud Hilding as Betjent
- Kay Killian as Pianist
- Anton Kontra as 1. violin
- Bertel Lauring as Tjener på hotel
- Ernst Meyer as Bankfunktionær
- Jens Okking as Køkkenmester
- Søren Rode as Fremmedarbejder
- Claus Ryskjær as Ekspedient i tøjforretning
- Bjørn Spiro as Bankchauffør
- Karl Stegger as Tjener
- Søren Strømberg as TV-speaker
- Solveig Sundborg as Nabokonen
- Bent Thalmay as Bud fra pelsfirma
- Poul Thomsen as Pilot
- Bent Vejlby as Lufthavnsbetjent
- Holger Vistisen as Receptionist på hotel
- Bent Warburg as TV-regissør
- Henrik Wiehe as Mand i fly
