= The Olsen Gang Long Gone =

1981 film

The Olsen Gang Over the Hill
- Film poster
- Directed by: Erik Balling
- Written by: Henning Bahs; Erik Balling
- Produced by: Bo Christensen
- Starring: Ove Sprogøe; Morten Grunwald; Poul Bundgaard
- Cinematography: Peter Klitgaard
- Edited by: Finn Henriksen; Leif Axel Kjeldsen
- Music by: Bent Fabricius-Bjerre
- Distributed by: Nordisk Film
- Release date: 26 December 1981
- Running time: 100 minutes
- Country: Denmark
- Language: Danish

The Olsen Gang Over the Hill (Danish: Olsen-banden over alle bjerge) is a 1981 Danish comedy film directed by Erik Balling and starring Ove Sprogøe.

== Cast ==
- Ove Sprogøe as Egon Olsen
- Morten Grunwald as Benny Frandsen
- Poul Bundgaard as Kjeld Jensen
- Kirsten Walther as Yvonne Jensen
- Axel Strøbye as Kriminalassistent Jensen
- Ole Ernst as Politiassistent Holm
- Bjørn Watt-Boolsen as Bang-Johansen
- Holger Juul Hansen as Hallandsen
- Ove Verner Hansen as Bøffen

Additionally, Poul Reichhardt portrays a Harbour Guard, Dick Kaysø portrays a Crane Operator, Claus Ryskjær portrays a Bodyguard leader, Søren Steen portrays another Bodyguard, Kai Løvring portrays a Cleaner, while Holger Perfort and Bertel Lauring portray Carlsberg workers.
