= Ballade på Christianshavn =

1970 film

- Film poster
- Directed by: Erik Balling
- Written by: Henning Bahs; Erik Balling
- Based on: Huset på Christianshavn by Erik Balling
- Produced by: Bo Christensen; Hanne Krebs
- Starring: Poul Reichhardt
- Cinematography: Jørgen Skov
- Edited by: Ole Steen Nielsen
- Distributed by: Nordisk Film
- Release date: 8 March 1971
- Running time: 100 minutes
- Country: Denmark
- Language: Danish

Ballade på Christianshavn is a 1971 Danish family comedy film directed by Erik Balling, and starring Poul Reichhardt. Karl Stegger won a Bodil Award for Best Actor in a Supporting Role for his role as caretaker Frederiksen.

== Cast ==
- Poul Reichhardt – Flyttemand Olsen
- Helle Virkner – Fru Olsen
- Jes Holtsø – William Olsen
- Paul Hagen – Dyrehandler Clausen
- Lis Løwert – Fru Clausen
- Kirsten Walther – Karla
- Willy Rathnov – Egon
- Ove Sprogøe – Hr. Larsen
- Arthur Jensen – Vicevært Meyer
- Kirsten Hansen-Møller – Rikke
- Finn Storgaard – Tue
- Bodil Udsen – Emma fra 'Rottehullet'
- Bjørn Watt-Boolsen – Alfred
- Poul Bundgaard – Direktør Hallandsen
- Bjørn Puggaard-Müller – Advokat Thomsen
- Ghita Nørby – Frk. Hansen
- Asbjørn Andersen – Departementchef Schwartz
- Karl Stegger – Vicevært Frederiksen
- Helge Kjærulff-Schmidt – Bankdirektør Ludvigsen
- Jørgen Beck – Henriksen
- Knud Hilding – Postbudet
- Gunnar Strømvad – Krølle
- Freddy Koch – Dideriksen
- Gotha Andersen – Mand fra belysningsvæsenet
- Lise Henningsen – Veninde til frk. Hansen
- Einar Nørby – Vagt
- Erni Arneson – Sekretær for Ludvigsen
- Ernst Meyer – Ansat i Boliganvisningen
