= The Last Exploits of the Olsen Gang =

- Poster by Aage Lundvald
- Directed by: Erik Balling
- Written by: Henning Bahs; Erik Balling
- Produced by: Bo Christensen
- Starring: Ove Sprogøe; Morten Grunwald; Poul Bundgaard; Kirsten Walther
- Edited by: Ole Steen Nielsen
- Music by: Bent-Fabricius Bjerre
- Distributed by: Nordisk Film
- Release date: 4 October 1974
- Country: Denmark
- Language: Danish

The Last Exploits of the Olsen Gang (Danish: Olsen-bandens sidste bedrifter) is a 1974 Danish comedy film directed by Erik Balling and starring Ove Sprogøe, Morten Grunwald, Poul Bundgaard and Kirsten Walther. This was the sixth film in the Olsen Gang series, and at the time of production it was meant to be the last. It was selected as the Danish entry for the Best Foreign Language Film at the 47th Academy Awards, but was not accepted as a nominee.

== Plot ==
After their last heist, the Olsen Gang went to Majorca, but without any money, as the loot accidentally got incinerated after Benny and Kjeld threw it out the window to hide it from the police. Egon opens the safe of a local restaurant to get back on track with the finances, but to his dismay the rest of the gang utterly (Note: Yvonne takes the biscuit by taking two Spanish police officers to meet Egon in flagrante delicto, to show him that her two charming friends are in fact bullfighters.) fail at their assigned task of watching his back and he is caught. Back in Denmark, after some time Egon is released from prison; Kjeld and Benny are waiting for him but Egon, on account of the events that led to his capture in Spain, abandons them: he has been hired by Stock Broker Holm Hansen to open a safe in Switzerland belonging to his deceased associate.

Egon demands 25% of the value equivalent of the contents of the safe as payment for his work. Holm Hansen agrees, but has his Swiss henchman double-cross Egon once the safe is open and leave him at the mercy of the Swiss police. Egon escapes though, and makes it back to Denmark, where he reunites with Benny and Kjeld with a new plan to exact revenge and claim his payment. The safe held the Bedford Diamonds, an extremely valuable collection of jewelry, much sought after as an inflation-proof investment for cash and wanted by police all over the world.

Holm Hansen sells the diamonds to an Arabian Oil Sheikh for 15 million dollars. Using a boat, a bus and one hundred balloons, the Gang manage to snatch the diamonds under the very nose of the Sheikh and his police escort. Egon, knowing that the diamonds cannot legally be sold, plans instead to use them to extort 50% of the 15 million from Holm Hansen, but is foiled by Yvonne, who has hidden the diamonds and replaced them with worthless souvenirs. Holm Hansen concludes that Egon is raving mad, but far too knowledgeable about his businesses and orders his henchman "Bøffen" to make Egon "disappear and stay gone forever".

Bøffen captures Egon and attempts to drown him in the Copenhagen harbor, but Egon is saved in the nick of time by Benny and Kjeld. Egon now has a final plan. With Benny and Kjeld disguised as police officers and Egon playing captive, the Gang confronts Holm Hansen. With Holm Hansen distracted by Benny, Egon and Kjeld open his safe and replace the 15 million dollars with the diamonds. Realizing he has been played, Holm Hansen calls the real police, which promptly arrest him on finding the Bedford Diamonds in his possession. The Gang subsequently escapes to Majorca with the money, thus the series finally should have come to an end.

== Cast ==
- Ove Sprogøe – Egon Olsen
- Morten Grunwald – Benny Frandsen
- Poul Bundgaard – Kjeld Jensen
- Bjørn Watt-Boolsen – John Morgan Rockefeller Holm Hansen, Jr.
- Jes Holtsø – Børge Jensen
- Kirsten Walther – Yvonne Jensen
- Axel Strøbye – Kriminalassistent Jensen
- Ole Ernst – Politiassistent Holm
- Ove Verner Hansen – Bøffen

== See also ==
- List of submissions to the 47th Academy Awards for Best Foreign Language Film
- List of Danish submissions for the Academy Award for Best Foreign Language Film
