= Martha (1967 film) =

1967 film

- Directed by: Erik Balling
- Written by: Henning Bahs; Erik Balling; Preben Kaas
- Produced by: Francis Carabott; Bo Christensen
- Starring: Ove Sprogøe
- Cinematography: Jørgen Skov
- Edited by: Birger Lind
- Distributed by: Nordisk Film
- Release date: 10 October 1967
- Running time: 93 minutes
- Country: Denmark
- Language: Danish

Martha (Original title: S/S Martha) is a 1967 Danish comedy film directed by Erik Balling and starring Ove Sprogøe. The film centres on the crew of an aging Danish tramp steamer plying the Mediterranean Sea, the SS Martha. Forgotten by the ship's owners, the eccentric crew enjoy life and indulge each other's foibles - until the company's strict owner arrives, putting their carefree life in jeopardy. The film enjoys a cult following, especially among mariners and has inspired fan clubs in Denmark and Sweden as well as a replica restaurant in Svendborg.

== Cast ==
- Ove Sprogøe - Hovmester Watson
- Morten Grunwald - 2nd Engineer Knud Hansen
- Poul Reichhardt - Chief Engineer Brovst
- Poul Bundgaard - 2nd Engineer Alf
- Karl Stegger - Kaptajn Peter Nielsen
- Preben Kaas - Kokken
- Helge Kjærulff-Schmidt - Skibsreder O.P. Andersen
- Lily Weiding - Frk. Bruun
- Hanne Borchsenius - Lone Andersen
- Eleni Anousaki - Laura
- Henrik Wiehe - Styrmanden
- Birger Jensen - Halfdan
- Paul Hagen - Telegraph operator Marius Knudsen
- Bjørn Puggaard-Müller - Johansen
- Gunnar Bigum - Regnskabschef
- Holger Vistisen - Dørmand
- Sverre Wilberg - Skibsreder Amundsen
- Sotiris Moustakas - Hector
- Antonis Papadopoulos - Aias
- Odd Wolstad - Kaptajn på Harald
- Lone Luther - Rengøringsdame
- Stavros Christofides - Fyrbøder Alexander

== Production ==
Film makers Erik Balling and Henning Bahs searched Greek ports for a suitably old and colourful tramp steamer. They found the steamer SS Margarita, originally built in Denmark in 1927 as the SS Aslaug, laid up after a 1966 fire. Chartered from her Greek owners, the ship became the setting, and to many, the main character of the film, her final role before being scrapped after filming.
