= The Olsen Gang in a Fix =

1969 film

- Poster by Aage Lundvald
- Directed by: Erik Balling
- Written by: Henning Bahs; Erik Balling
- Produced by: Bo Christensen
- Starring: Ove Sprogøe
- Cinematography: Jørgen Skov
- Edited by: Ole Steen Nielsen
- Distributed by: Nordisk Film
- Release date: 3 October 1969
- Running time: 111 minutes
- Country: Denmark
- Language: Danish

The Olsen Gang in a Fix (Danish: Olsen-banden på spanden) is a 1969 Danish comedy film directed by Erik Balling and starring Ove Sprogøe. The film was the second in the Olsen-banden-series.

== Plot ==
After a tremendously daring or at least badly planned and utterly unsuccessful attempt to rob a savings bank, Egon is jailed. When released, he has now been rehabilitated by the pretty social worker Bodil. He gets a steady job at a toy factory and hopes to impress by being a lawful citizen. Despite Benny and Kjeld's objections Egon is clear in his mind, and instead they also begin a life of being lawful citizens.

Although it starts well for the gang, they are eventually thrown back towards a criminal path, when they are accused of a robbery committed right in front of them in the vault of the Danish National Bank, where they serve as cleaning people, after a mishap at the toy factory. Although the police think that the gang committed the robbery, it is in fact the mafia boss Serafimo "Spats" Motzarella [sic] (Harold Stone) who sent a team to rob the vault and place the loot, allegedly the Danish crown jewels, in a cello case. It is revealed that the jewels on display at Rosenborg Castle are copies, as the original jewels were to be sold in secrecy to relieve the country's dire economical situation.

The gang, who are now really in a fix, must bring back the jewels in order to avoid the accusation. They succeed in hijacking the cello case from the airport as the gangsters are leaving the country, but the gangsters manage to track them back to their residing place, a bar in Copenhagen, which ends up being shot to pieces by the gangsters as they regain the cello case. Through a variety of disguises and diversion, the gang manage to trick the gangsters and re-repossess the cello case, but now they are not only wanted by the gangsters, but also by the officious detective Mortensen. After a long car chase and a lucky escape, they enroll Benny's heavily alcohol-using brother Dynamite-Harry, an expert in explosives, to open the cello case at a remote gravel pit.

Unbeknownst to the gang, Motzarella arrives from New York himself, joined with a task force from his German branch, to track down and wipe out the gang for good and recover the jewels. Meanwhile, Bodil herself has tracked down Motzarella, partly to use him as a new case study for rehabilitation, partly to establish the truth concerning Egon's involvement in the alleged coup at the national bank. Harry's attempt to blow the lid off the cello case accidentally blows the Germans up instead. The cello case, however, remains unopened and Egon is fuming. Finally, Motzarella arrives in a helicopter along with Bodil. The gang hand over the cello case to Motzarella who, for a small fee, facilitate the non-illegal sale of the jewels and Bodil follows Motzarella back to the states. Depressed and scared, Benny and Kjeld go home expecting to meet a fuming Yvonne, who could afford new durable goods through Kjeld's work, but after Kjeld got fired everything was seized by the debt collector. They are tremendously surprised to discover that Yvonne, with a little help from Bodil, has got all the things back.

Happy from being cleared of all accusations, Egon enters the bar and is met by a slightly nervous bartender, who is scared because the bar has been shot down several times during the course of the movie. Egon calms him down, but then Mortensen enters the bar. He is armed to the teeth and the bar is yet again shot to pieces. Mortensen arrests Egon, who is puzzled and asks why. Mortensen replies by mentioning several petty crimes committed by Egon during the hunt for the jewels, and Egon is yet again imprisoned.

== Cast ==
- Ove Sprogøe as Egon Olsen
- Morten Grunwald as Benny Frandsen
- Poul Bundgaard as Kjeld Jensen
- Ghita Nørby as Frk. Bodil Hansen
- Peter Steen as Kriminalassistent William Mortensen
- Preben Kaas as Dynamit Harry (Frandsen)
- Poul Reichhardt as Politichefen
- Paul Hagen as Tjener Hansen
- Kirsten Walther as Yvonne Jensen
- Karl Stegger as K.O.R.S. inspektør
- Birger Jensen as Dynamit Harry's lærling
- Jes Holtsø as Børge Jensen
- Harold J. Stone as Serafimo "Spats" Motzarella
- Gert Bastian
- Svend Bille as Direktør for legetøjsfabrik
- Anders Bodelsen
- Edward Fleming as Serafimos håndlanger
- Benny Hansen as Politibetjent, chauffør
- Kirsten Hansen-Møller
- Lise Henningsen
- Edith Hermansen
- Paul Hüttel as Bankrøver
- Wladirmir Kandel
- Palle Kjærulff-Schmidt as Chauffør under biljagt
- Viggo Larsen
- Ernst Meyer as Scared man in car under car chase
- Bjørn Puggaard-Müller as Guard in Nationalbanken
- André Sallyman
- Jørgen Teytaud
- Johan Thiersen
- Poul Thomsen as Værkfører på legetøjsfabrik
- Holger Vistisen as Præst der taler i telefon
