= The Olsen Gang's Last Trick =

- Theatrical release poster
- Directed by: Tom Hedegaard; Morten Arnfred
- Written by: Henning Bahs; Erik Balling
- Produced by: Bo Christensen
- Starring: Ove Sprogøe
- Music by: Bent Fabricius-Bjerre
- Distributed by: Nordisk Film
- Release date: 18 December 1998
- Running time: 100 minutes
- Country: Denmark
- Language: Danish
- Box office: 627,101 admissions (Denmark)

The Olsen Gang's Last Trick (Danish: Olsen-bandens sidste stik) is a 1998 Danish comedy film directed by Tom Hedegaard and Morten Arnfred, and starring Ove Sprogøe. The film was the 14th and last in the Olsen Gang series. This film was a latecomer after a 17-year break, when the other films were recorded with an annual premiere or close to it in the period 1968–1981.

During the recordings, both Poul Bundgaard and the director Tom Hedegaard died. Morten Arnfred took over the direction, while Tommy Kenter recorded individual scenes in the role of Kjeld (Bundgaard's role), and Kurt Ravn provided the voice. It was arranged so that Kjeld is either seen from behind or from a long distance. However, they had managed to get a number of scenes with close-ups of Poul Bundgaard recorded beforehand, so the replacement did not mean much for the overall film, apart from the end, which had to be completely rewritten so that Kjeld was not included. Instead, Ruth is the third member of the Gang.

== Plot ==
After 17 years, Egon gets placed at the Institute for Theoretical Crime, which is a psychiatric institution for incurably criminal persons. He had left the institution for the first time to participate in a TV talk show. Benny, who worked in unreported employment for a taxi company, and Kjeld, who sits in a wheelchair and lives in a nursing home after Yvonne's death in 1987, both watch the broadcast. They both decide to immediately visit the TV studio to seek out, once again, Egon, whom they have not seen for 17 years.

While Egon desperately seeks a toilet after participating in the talk show, he goes outside the studio, where he meets Benny. Together, they decide to visit Kjeld at the nursing home. Kjeld met a lady, Ruth, with whom he wanted to buy an apartment for both of them in Málaga. Egon has a new plan to lead the Olsen gang to the necessary capital. During his long time in psychiatry, Egon has devised countless plans, all of which have been confiscated by the superintendent and are now in his safe. The Olsen gang opens the safe to realize Egon's most significant plan: rob the English crown jewels.

However, not only Kjeld and Benny could recognize Egon on television, but also department head Hallandsen from the Ministry of Justice. This causes the Olsen gang a problem, namely that in Denmark, there is a suitcase containing the strictly confidential Wandenberg documents. If these become public knowledge, the world will collapse, as these documents contain precise descriptions of all significant scandals from the past decades. A first attempt by Hallandsen, with the help of two ministry officials, fails to steal the documents from the Ministry of Foreign Affairs' archive, where they are kept. Because of the broadcast, he has been reminded of Egon Olsen, which makes the problem bigger. He instructs expedition secretary Holm-Hansen to find Egon. Holm-Hansen consults detective assistant Jensen, who should have retired long ago but had to wait 17 years due to a computer error. Jensen advises Holm-Hansen to check the only Franz Jäger safe from 1944 left in Denmark, which Egon will sooner or later break open. This cabinet is located in the Department of Theoretical Crime.

Meanwhile, at the institute, Egon plans to steal his plans from the safe. On their way out, they are suddenly accosted by the headmaster, who naturally wants to lock Egon up again. At the last moment, Holm-Hansen intervenes and brings Egon; after that, Kjeld and Benny leave the institute unnoticed.

Egon is brought to Hallandsen, who gives him the task of stealing the Wandenberg documents—of course, for a measured reward. After the two office officers have helped Hallandsen, Egon steals the documents within a few minutes. After Hallandsen has obtained the documents, Egon demands the promised reward but is instead locked up in a dungeon in the Ministry of Justice, where he is again attacked by Bøffen and his assistant Alf. However, Kjeld and Benny manage to free Egon at the last moment.

Hallandsen wants the suitcase with the Wandenberg documents destroyed at the state-of-the-art state destruction facility, which Egon wants to prevent and bring the suitcase into his possession to blackmail Hallandsen. Together with Benny and Kjeld, he can—with the help of a boat hook, a bottle of washing-up liquid, and numerous other remedies—take back the suitcase with the Wandenberg documents. Hallandsen is deeply shocked as he drives away. Bøffen and Alf attack Egon again.

When the Olsen gang drives to the construction site of the Øresund connection, where the suitcase must be delivered, Ruth suddenly gets into the car instead of Kjeld. She justifies this by saying that Kjeld is not feeling well and that she is, therefore, coming in his place. Reluctantly, Egon allows her presence.

When they arrive at the construction site, Egon, Benny, and Ruth are attacked again by Bøffen and Alf and lowered into a construction cave. There, they—together with the Wandenberg documents and Egon's plans—must be removed from the road. As a result of Egon's intervention, they can be freed.

At the same time, they meet an old acquaintance in Denmark - Kjeld's son Børge, who lives abroad as an international company manager. He learns from Kjeld what has happened and then starts looking for Egon, Benny, and Ruth. He meets the happily assembled Olsen gang when he arrives at the construction site. While Benny says goodbye, Egon demands his reward from Holm-Hansen. In the next moment, Egon watches helplessly as Ruth and Alf throw the suitcases with Egon's plans and the Wandenberg documents onto a construction machine, after which they disappear without a trace. Hallandsen wants to flee to Jutland, and Holm-Hansen gets appointed as his successor, whose first action is to retire detective assistant Jensen.

At the film's end, Egon, Benny, Kjeld, Ruth, and Alf travel to Børge's villa in Portugal to live the rest of their lives in peace and quiet. Egon still plans to carry out the remaining plan: steal the crown jewels.

== Cast ==
- Ove Sprogøe as Egon Olsen
- Morten Grunwald as Benny Frandsen
- Poul Bundgaard as Kjeld Jensen
  - Tommy Kenter as Kjeld Jensen (Stand-in)
  - Kurt Ravn as the voice of Kjeld
- Grethe Sønck as Ruth Hansen
- Jes Holtsø as Børge Jensen
- Axel Strøbye as Kriminalassistent Jensen
- Ole Ernst as Politiassistent Holm
- Bjørn Watt-Boolsen as Hallandsen
- Henrik Koefoed as J.M.R. Holm Hansen Jr.
- Ove Verner Hansen as Bøffen
- Michael Hasselflug as Alf
- Jesper Langberg as Direktør for Statsadministrationens Destruktionsanstalt
- Claus Ryskjær as Portvagt
- Henrik Lykkegaard as Sikkerhedsvagt
- Benny Hansen as Portør
- Jan Hertz as Ejendomsmægler
- Holger Perfort as Forstander for Institut for Teoretisk kriminalitet

== Reception ==
The film is generally considered a disaster, both on and off-screen. Main actor Poul Bundgaard and director Tom Hedegaard both died during production, Benny Hansen who appeared briefly as a hospital porter died two days after the end of filming, and veteran actor Bjørn Watt-Boolsen, who had appeared as the evil mastermind in most of the previous movies in the series, died just 10 days after opening night. The film itself was generally scolded by critics, and even Olsen Gang creator and scriptwriter Erik Balling later regretted having made it.

The film was the second highest grossing film in Denmark during 1999 behind The One and Only with admissions of 627,101.
