= The Olsen Gang Goes Crazy =

- Poster by Aage Lundvald
- Directed by: Erik Balling
- Written by: Henning Bahs; Erik Balling
- Produced by: Bo Christensen
- Starring: Ove Sprogøe
- Edited by: Ole Steen Nielsen
- Distributed by: Nordisk Film
- Release date: 5 October 1973
- Country: Denmark
- Language: Danish

The Olsen Gang Goes Crazy (Danish: Olsen-banden går amok) is a 1973 Danish comedy film directed by Erik Balling and starring Ove Sprogøe. This was the fifth film in the Olsen Gang-series.

For the first time Axel Strøbye appeared as criminal assistant Jensen, pursuing the gang in all later films.

== Plot ==
A robbery in a cinema goes awry when the alcoholic brother of Benny, Dynamite-Harry, surprisingly arrives in the middle of the robbery, and Egon ends up in jail yet again, while the rest of the gang, including Harry, escapes.

Egon is released eight months later, but many things have occurred while Egon has been behind bars. Benny and Kjeld have got a permanent job at a local merchant, run by an elderly man named Quist. His daughter Ragna has fallen in love with Benny, to the dismay of her father, who would rather have had an academician. Egon must settle with Dynamite-Harry, as Benny and Kjeld are not interested in the plan Egon has worked out in the prison. The plan is about stealing 6 million kroner - money that cannot be traced. Dynamite-Harry has quit drinking totally after messing up the robbery in the cinema, and he happily helps Egon with a robbery in a merchant. However, it turns out that the merchant they try to rob is the shop where Benny and Kjeld work, and the safe is empty. Benny and Kjeld are doing overtime but are accused of the robbery and imprisoned as Egon and Harry flee before the merchant Quist appears with a rifle, before calling the police.

Later, Egon frees his friends during a prisoner transport. Now with the gang reunited, they can now go on with Egon's plan. The money are placed in a safe at a warehouse in Christianshavn. The plan is to sneak in through the sewage system, and to continuing up towards the offices where the safe is, secured with light-sensitive alarms and hydraulic doors. A few hours before the robbery, Benny and Kjeld are visited by the merchant and Ragna. They want to clear out with their former employees because Ragna still loves Benny. Egon is yet again left on his own, and this time he can't even persuade Harry to join him, especially not if they are going to sail in a boat, which is part of the plan. He decides to complete the robbery on his own, and it goes well until he has to go down a manhole cover in a cold storage, where a guard appears. Having to think quickly, he hides in an unlocked cold room.

Meanwhile, Benny and Kjeld have realised how badly the economic situation is in the grocery store, running at a major deficit. The two gang members run away and try to find Egon. They appear in the cold storage's sewer in the exact moment the guard is on his way out. He hears the sound of the manhole cover, turns around and discover that one of the rooms is unlocked. The guards locks the room, with Egon still inside and he is now trapped in a freezingly cold storage room. Despite this, he manages to get Benny and Kjeld's attention by knocking on the door, and they realise that he is locked inside the room. They are unaware however that the room he is trapped within is a cold room. Benny thinks of Dynamite-Harry, who can blow a hole in the wall on the other side of the cold room, and this time they have to dress up as men transporting beer. They "loan" a beer van and bring Harry along by forcing him to sit at the back of the van, surrounded by thousands of filled beer bottles. Egon is saved. The temptation is too big for Harry at the back of the van, and he is soon in cloud nine, singing Danish psalms in drunkenness.

Throughout the film, the very storage where Egon was trapped has been under severe guard of the police, and after the police successfully storm the warehouse, the police encounters a big problem - the safe. They can't open it, not even with the help of the country's best specialists. The detective instantly thinks of Egon Olsen. Having been escaped, he has brought home to Kjeld and Yvonne, where they have warmed him up. Then the gang panics when the police appears, wanting to speak to Egon Olsen, and they throw the suitcase containing the money into a garbage container, which ends up being brought to a CHP, where the money is blown up. The black powder shown when the money blows up indicates that the money in the suitcase were dirty money.

With the help of a cabinet number hidden in his hat, Egon manages to open the safe, and is applauded by the officers, and the detective hands Egon 500 kroner of his own wallet to show his gratitude. The detective is shocked to find out that the safe is empty.

Egon is driven to the airport by the police, and he manages to get on a plane destined for Mallorca along with the rest of the gang including Yvonne and Børge in the nick of time. Only at this point does he realise what has happened to the money.

== Cast ==
- Ove Sprogøe - Egon Olsen
- Morten Grunwald - Benny Frandsen
- Poul Bundgaard - Kjeld Jensen
- Preben Kaas - Harry
- Axel Strøbye - Kriminalassistent Jensen
- Jes Holtsø - Børge Jensen
- Kirsten Walther - Yvonne Jensen
- Birgitte Federspiel - Ragna
- Ejner Federspiel - Købmand Quist
