= The Olsen Gang Sees Red =

1976 film

- Poster by Aage Lundvald
- Directed by: Erik Balling
- Written by: Henning Bahs; Erik Balling
- Produced by: Bo Christensen
- Starring: Ove Sprogøe; Morten Grunwald; Poul Bundgaard
- Cinematography: Henning Kristiansen
- Music by: Bent Fabricius-Bjerre
- Distributed by: Nordisk Film
- Release date: 1 October 1976
- Running time: 100 minutes
- Country: Denmark
- Language: Danish

The Olsen Gang Sees Red (Danish: Olsen-banden ser rødt) is a 1976 Danish comedy film directed by Erik Balling and starring Ove Sprogøe, Morten Grunwald and Poul Bundgaard. The film was the eighth in the Olsen Gang-series, and was selected as the Danish entry for the Best Foreign Language Film at the 49th Academy Awards, but was not accepted as a nominee.

== Plot ==
Egon is released once again from the prison in Vridsløselille, where he is received by Kjeld and Benny, after which they drive home to Kjeld and Yvonne. Yvonne however is not very fond of Egon as he is constantly being arrested. Also present is Fie, who is to marry Børge, who always smashes the porcelain of the house. The gang starts discussing their upcoming coup, which is about a Chinese vase worth DKK 1.5 million, which is to be sold to a Dutch buyer. The gang breaks in and steals the vase at Sankt Annæ Plads in Copenhagen but finds out that it is a Chinese copy from Hong Kong and that Egon has been cheated.

The gang then set off to steal the original vase, but Egon gets trapped and walled inside a basement, so Benny and Kjeld must free him. The vase is in turn handed over to the Dutch buyer. The band therefore continues the hunt for the Royal Theater, where the buyer is with the money and the vase. The gang breaks through four walls with various tools to reach an elevator and on to the Dutch buyer, where they steal the money and the vase. Fie and Børge get married and fly to Mallorca, but it turns out that Fie has changed the suitcase with the one with the money. The two newlyweds fly off with the money, while the gang at home are shocked to see that the suitcase is full of clothes and not the money they expected.

== Cast ==
- Ove Sprogøe as Egon Olsen
- Morten Grunwald as Benny Frandsen
- Poul Bundgaard as Kjeld Jensen
- Kirsten Walther as Yvonne Jensen
- Jes Holtsø as Børge Jensen
- Lene Brøndum as Fie Jensen
- Bjørn Watt-Boolsen as Lensbaron Ulrik Christian Frederik Løvenwold
- Ove Verner Hansen as Frits
- Ejner Federspiel as Joachim
- Axel Strøbye as Crime Assistant Jensen
- Ole Ernst as Police Assistant Holm
- Buster Larsen as Master Chef
- Bent Mejding as Conductor

== Reception ==
The film received critical and audience praise, for its writing, acting, directing and music, and was selected as the Danish entry for the Best Foreign Language Film at the 49th Academy Awards, but was not accepted as a nominee. The film also became a box office success, selling about 1.3 million tickets, making it the highest-grossing Danish film of all time.

== See also ==
- List of submissions to the 49th Academy Awards for Best Foreign Language Film
- List of Danish submissions for the Academy Award for Best Foreign Language Film
