= The Olsen Gang (film) =

1968 film

- Theatrical poster
- Directed by: Erik Balling
- Written by: Henning Bahs; Erik Balling
- Produced by: Bo Christensen
- Starring: Ove Sprogøe; Morten Grunwald; Poul Bundgaard
- Cinematography: Jeppe Jeppesen; Claus Loof
- Edited by: Ole Steen Nielsen
- Distributed by: Nordisk Film
- Release date: 11 October 1968
- Running time: 80 minutes
- Country: Denmark
- Language: Danish

The Olsen Gang (Danish: Olsen-banden) is a 1968 Danish comedy film directed by Erik Balling and starring Ove Sprogøe, Morten Grunwald, and Poul Bundgaard. This was the first film in the Olsen-banden-series.

== Plot ==
The plot involves the Olsen Gang as they plan to become millionaires. The film starts by Egon being arrested for trying to rob a store, while the others, Kjeld and Benny, run away. After Egon is set free, the gang plan on stealing a golden statue which is worth 12 million. After some planning, the gang sets the plan in action and steal the golden statue. On their way to the airport, their car runs out of gas and the police come take the car (with the statue in it). Constantly chased by Mortensen, they manage to get the statue back and hide it in Kjeld's daughter's pram. However, Kjeld's wife Yvonne is mad at Kjeld for letting the family wait at the airport, as well as leaving the pram outside on the sidewalk and takes it away and plans on going back to her mother.

The gang now chases after Yvonne (with Mortensen on their tail) and finally succeed on getting the pram back. After almost getting caught, Egon makes a little speech, just before he realizes that the statue is not in the pram. Egon goes mad and leaves Benny and Kjeld behind while he chases after Yvonne. Kjeld and Benny however walk back home with the pram. It then turns out that Yvonne didn't go to her mother after all but came back to Kjeld while Benny is driven home by Ulla. Egon is caught by the police on the ferry where Yvonne was supposed to be. Two years later Egon is released and the gang continues to break the law by selling bananas outside the Copenhagen government building.

== Cast ==
- Ove Sprogøe as Egon Olsen
- Morten Grunwald as Benny Frandsen
- Poul Bundgaard as Kjeld Jensen
- Peter Steen as Inspector Mortensen
- Jes Holtsø as Børge Jensen
- Kirsten Walther as Yvonne Jensen
- Poul Reichhardt as Police chief
- Lotte Tarp as Ulla: Benny's girlfriend who is a pornographic actor.
- Grethe Sønck as Connie
- Ole Monty as Sheriff
- Paul Hagen as Hansen

Additional cast:

- Arthur Jensen
- Ejner Federspiel
- Poul Thomsen
- Ulf Pilgaard
- Ebba Amfeldt
- Einar Juhl
- Valsø Holm
- Lise Henningsen
- Hanne Løye
- Lone Gersel
- Ernst Meyer
- Benny Hansen
- Edward Fleming
- Solveig Sundborg
- Bjørn Puggaard-Müller
- Ego Brønnum-Jacobsen
- Søren Rode
- Perry Knudsen
- Gunnar Strømvad
- Asger Clausen
- Gunnar Bigum
- Bjørn Spiro
- Knud Hilding
