= Olsen Gang =

Danish comedy film series about a fictional criminal gang

- Olsen Gang organization
- Left to right: Kjeld, Benny, Yvonne, Egon.
- First appearance: The Olsen Gang (1968)
- Last appearance: The Olsen Gang's Last Trick (1998)

In-universe information
- Type: Fictional crime syndicate
- Location: Denmark
- Leader: Egon Olsen
- Key people: Benny Frandsen; Kjeld Jensen

The Olsen Gang (Danish: Olsen-banden, Norwegian: Olsenbanden) is a Danish heist comedy film series created by Danish director Erik Balling and special effects expert Henning Bahs about the eponymous fictional criminal gang. The gang's leader is the class-conscious criminal genius and habitual offender Egon Olsen and his accomplices are Benny and Kjeld (Kjell in Norwegian). The films make use of physical comedy. The gang members are harmless, rarely target ordinary citizens, and never deliberately use violence, (Note: However, the gun barrel of an AFV is used to knock out a bodyguard animated cartoon–style in The Olsen Gang Never Surrenders, while henchmen (e.g. Bøffen) may fall victim of their own violent schemes.) but rely instead on sneaking, hacking of security systems and social engineering in their heists. The first film came in 1968; during the next thirty years a total of fourteen films were made.

A Norwegian version of the film series was also made (a total of 14 films from 1969 to 1999), in most cases based directly on the scripts for the Danish films. Later, starting in 1981, Sweden also produced their own version: Jönssonligan.

The movies enjoyed great popularity in East Germany.

== Plot ==
Most of the films start with Egon coming out of jail and being enthusiastically welcomed by Benny and Kjeld. The three men will then have a beer together in the living room of Kjeld's home in Valby, where Egon will inform his friends of his latest plan for making them millionaires. The target of the heist usually comes from whatever white-collar criminal Egon shared his cell with and the victims are corrupt elements of the economic elite. Plans are often two-step plans, where the first heist, which always works flawlessly, will get funds and equipment for the real, second plan. The plans usually feature everyday artifacts such as Lego, party balloons, cigarettes, etc., which are then brought together in surprising ways in elaborate and well-timed plans, often including clever social engineering. Benny's function in the heists, besides get-away-driver, is picking locks and starting machinery using "The Thing", a specially shaped brass piece used for manipulating machinery and opening doors. Egon often serves time in prison with lawyers or executives who provide him with the information he needs, such as duty rosters for the national public record office. Egon is also a brilliant safecracker, operating manually, specializing in the fictive "Franz Jäger" brand.

Egon's plans often bring the gang into perilously close contact with white-collar criminals from the Danish business (and political) elite. For example, in the ninth installment named "Olsen-banden deruda" well-connected people try to make money out of the so-called "butter mountain", a huge amount of butter bought up and stored by the EEC (now the EU) to keep prices up. Egon Olsen learns about this from a lawyer who is serving prison time, and the gang interferes with the plan to secure the millions for themselves, but as always, Egon – after having succeeded with a genius plan – fails for a variety of reasons, for instance underestimating the power and unscrupulousness of these people, bad luck, interference from Kjeld's wife Yvonne, or other surprising elements. For several films, the role of the antagonist was filled by CEO Hallandsen of the fictive, multinational company Hallandsen Inc. - or variations thereof. Egon is usually arrested in the end, for various reasons: scapegoat, bad luck, some irrelevant crime, or even turning himself in as a matter of honor.

A recurring part of the film is making fun of Danish authorities, especially the police. In some earlier installments, the clumsy Police Inspector Mortensen is used for slapstick comic relief; he is later replaced by Superintendent Jensen, an older, troubled man who has seen better days. He is a resigned character who despises the Danish government as he often criticizes Hallandsen crimes going unnoticed and mentions to his assistant, Inspector Holm: "The only thing the police can do when the real big criminals come by is offer them protection!" Jensen incredulously uses the recurring exclamation "Bagmændene!" (Behind-men/Big Fishes) to reference the in-joke of powerful players moving outside of the law.

In the early installments, profanity and soft-erotica (scantily-clad women) were more freely used than in later ones, where such content was somewhat watered down to suit younger viewers. Later films focused on the satirical interplay between Jensen and Holm and Egon and his crew, with a frequent outburst of anger from Egon. His long list of slurs is especially famous, like "social democrats!", "insane woman!" (to Yvonne), "lousy amateurs!", "cowards!", "dog heads!", "porridge peasants!", "sop!", "scumbags!", to name a few.

== Characters ==
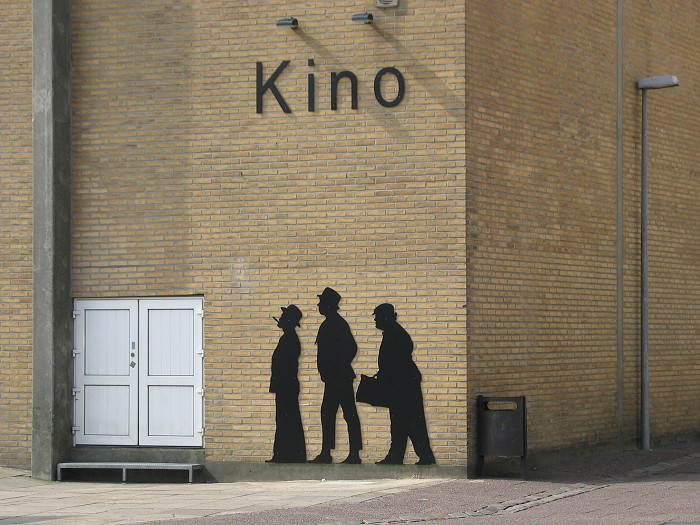
Olsen Gang silhouettes at a cinema wall in Thisted, Denmark.

Recurring characters in the Danish version:

- Egon Olsen: Gang leader, expert safecracker, brilliant but short-tempered and occasionally overdramatic.
- Benny Frandsen: Gang member, get-away driver, always cheerful and handles practical stuff.
- Kjeld Jensen: Gang member, tool master, ever nervous and humble, but occasionally rises to meet any challenge.
- Yvonne Jensen: Kjeld's very bossy wife, often with firm plans on how to use the millions from the various plans.
- Børge Jensen: Kjeld and Yvonne's son, occasionally an impeccable part of the schemes.
- Dynamite Harry: Benny's brother, explosives expert (at least in his own opinion) and deeply alcoholic.
- Jensen: Superintendent at Copenhagen Police, somewhat disillusioned and mostly forgotten by the brass in his basement office.
- Holm: Detective with Copenhagen Police, young and highly ambitious, but somewhat naive.
- Mortensen: An overambitious but very clumsy inspector with Copenhagen Police appearing in the early films.
- Holm-Hansen/Bang-Johansen/Hallandsen: A role with the same actor playing various villains, always on top of the social hierarchy, most often also with international contacts.
- King and Knight: A confidence trickster and his violent nephew.
- Bøffen (The Beef): Enforcer and muscleman for Hallandsen and others.
- Hansen: Rival gang leader with theme music from Bob le flambeur.

== International versions ==
The Olsen Gang have been made in Norwegian and Swedish (Jönssonligan) versions too. While both remakes follow a generally similar formula to the Danish films, the Swedish version diverges considerably from the Danish original in terms of storylines and character development.

=== Norwegian Olsenbanden ===
The Norwegian remakes were, with two exceptions, directed by Knut Bohwim based on Balling and Bahs's original scripts with minor adaptations to Norwegian conditions. For example, some names of the main characters were changed: Kjeld became Kjell, Yvonne became Valborg, and Børge became Basse. The character of Benny's brother, Dynamite Harry, was used much more often in the Norwegian films than in the original Danish series, with six appearances.

=== Swedish Jönssonligan ===
In the Swedish version, the Egon character is called Charles-Ingvar "Sickan" Jönsson, with a slightly different costume and mannerisms, and was a huge success for the actor Gösta Ekman until the actor got tired of the character and left the series. Benny's character was named (Ragnar) Vanheden, a small-timer from Stockholm, played by Ulf Brunnberg. Kjeld's character was named Rocky, but appeared only in the first two films. From the second film, the character Dynamit-Harry played by Björn Gustafson (who has had rather minor parts in the original Danish films) was featured instead. Although starting out as a strict remake, after a while the franchise started writing their own scripts.

The Swedish franchise eventually expanded into films of the band as young kids: Lilla Jönssonligan (little Jönsson band) with four features to date.

There was also an attempt to reboot the franchise, featuring brand new actors in the adult roles. Jönssonligan – Den perfekta stöten (2015) was released to middling reviews and poor box office.

== Danish films ==
The first thirteen films were directed by Erik Balling, while Tom Hedegaard and Morten Arnfred directed the fourteenth and final Olsen Gang film. The scripts were written by Balling and Henning Bahs, who also worked as a production designer.

| English title (original title) | Release date | Notes |
|---|---|---|
| The Olsen Gang (Olsen-banden) | October 11, 1968 | |
| The Olsen Gang in a Fix (Olsen-banden på spanden) | October 3, 1969 | |
| The Olsen Gang in Jutland (Olsen-banden i Jylland) | October 8, 1971 | |
| The Olsen Gang's Big Score (Olsen-bandens store kup) | October 6, 1972 | |
| The Olsen Gang Goes Crazy (Olsen-banden går amok) | October 5, 1973 | |
| The Last Exploits of the Olsen Gang (Olsen-bandens sidste bedrifter) | October 4, 1974 | This was intended to be the last film at the time it was made. |
| The Olsen Gang on the Track (Olsen-banden på sporet) | September 26, 1975 | |
| The Olsen Gang Sees Red (Olsen-banden ser rødt) | October 1, 1976 | This film contains the famous showdown scene in which the gang bombs, drills, and hammers its way through the basement of the Royal Danish Theatre in synchronicity with the music of Friedrich Kuhlau's overture to the opera Elverhøj. |
| The Olsen Gang Outta Sight (Olsen-banden deruda') | September 30, 1977 | |
| The Olsen Gang Goes to War (Olsen-banden går i krig) | October 6, 1978 | |
| The Olsen Gang Never Surrenders (Olsen-banden overgiver sig aldrig) | October 26, 1979 | |
| The Olsen Gang's Escape over the Fence (Olsen-bandens flugt over plankeværket) | October 16, 1981 | |
| The Olsen Gang Long Gone (Olsen-banden over alle bjerge) | December 26, 1981 | |
| The Olsen Gang's Last Trick (Olsen-bandens sidste stik) | December 18, 1998 | The actor in the role as "Kjeld Jensen", Poul Bundgaard, died while filming the last film. The actor Tommy Kenter stepped in to fill his role to finish the film. This was hidden through various effects and cover-up techniques. |

=== Danish cast ===
- Ove Sprogøe as Egon Olsen
- Morten Grunwald as Benny Frandsen
- Poul Bundgaard as Kjeld Jensen
- Kirsten Walther as Yvonne Jensen
- Jes Holtsø as Børge Jensen
- Axel Strøbye as Superintendent of police Jensen
- Ole Ernst as Police inspector Holm (Dick Kaysø replaces Ernst in one film)
- Ove Verner Hansen as Bøffen
- Preben Kaas as Dynamite-Harry
- Peter Steen and Jesper Langberg as Mortensen (Steen appeared in two films, Langberg in one film)

=== Spin-offs ===
A Danish TV series and a feature film have been made showing the main characters as children, following the Swedish success of Lilla Jönssonligan:

- Olsen-bandens første kup (TV series, 1999–2000)
- Olsen-banden Junior (2001)

Two animated films have been released in the 2010s:

- Olsen-banden på de bonede gulve (Olsen Gang Gets Polished, 2010)
- Olsen-banden på dybt vand (The Olsen Gang in Deep Trouble, 2013)

== Norwegian films ==
DVD cover of the first Norwegian Olsenbanden: from left to right: Benny, Egon, Kjell.

- Olsenbanden Operasjon Egon (1969)
- Olsenbanden og Dynamitt-Harry (1970)
- Olsenbanden tar gull (1972)
- Olsenbanden og Dynamitt-Harry går amok (1973)
- Olsenbanden møter Kongen og Knekten (1974)
- Olsenbandens siste bedrifter (1975)
- Olsenbanden for full musikk (1976)
- Olsenbanden og Dynamitt-Harry på sporet (1977)
- Olsenbanden og Data-Harry sprenger verdensbanken (1978)
- Olsenbanden mot nye høyder (1979)
- Olsenbanden gir seg aldri (1981)
- Olsenbandens aller siste kupp (1982)
- …men Olsenbanden var ikke død (1984)
- Olsenbandens siste stikk (1999)
- Olsenbanden – Siste skrik! (2022)

Several elements recur in the film series. As the Japanese carmaker Toyota was usually the main sponsor of the film series, most cars, including the villain's cars, the security cars, the police cars, the gang's car, civilian cars parked on the sidewalks, etc., were supplied by the company. Models include the Crown as taxis, Toyota Cressida as police cars, Hiace as security vans and money transports, and so on. There have been exceptions, notably Olsenbandens aller siste kupp (The Olsen-Gang's Very Last Coup) from 1982, which was sponsored by Datsun.

In 2022, a film reboot with a new team of actors was released, where the Olsen Gang make plans to steal the painting The Scream from the Munch Museum.

=== Norwegian DVDs ===
Most of the Norwegian films have been digitally restored. The discs include English and Norwegian subtitles, 16:9 format and Dolby Digital 1.0 surround sound.

DVD release list:

- Olsenbanden Operasjon Egon (27 October 2004)
- Olsenbanden og Dynamitt-Harry (27 October 2004)
- Olsenbanden tar gull (27 October 2004)
- Olsenbanden og Dynamitt-Harry går amok
- Olsenbanden møter Kongen og Knekten (1 December 2004)
- Olsenbandens siste bedrifter (1 December 2004)
- Olsenbanden for full musikk (1 December 2004)
- Olsenbanden og Dynamitt-Harry på sporet (8 December 2004)
- Olsenbanden og Data-Harry sprenger verdensbanken (19 January 2005)
- Olsenbanden mot nye høyder (19 January 2005)
- Olsenbanden gir seg aldri (19 January 2005)
- Olsenbandens aller siste kupp (19 January 2005)
- ...men Olsenbanden var ikke død
- Olsenbandens siste stikk (1999)

=== Norwegian cast ===
- Arve Opsahl as Egon Olsen
- Sverre Holm as Benny Fransen
- Carsten Byhring as Kjell Jensen
- Aud Schønemann as Valborg Jensen
- Willie Hoel as Bartender Hansen (a character in the first two films; Hoel also plays various other small roles later in the series)
- Ove Verner Hansen as Biffen
- Pål Johannessen as Basse Jensen (appears in eight films)
- Sverre Wilberg as Superintendent of police Hermansen
- Øivind Blunck, Oddbjørn Hesjevoll, Ulf Wengård and Anders Hatlo as Police inspector Holm (Blunck appears in five films, and Hesjevoll, Wengård and Hatlo in one film each respectively. Wengård also plays a similar but different character, named 'Blom', in '...men Olsenbanden var ikke død'.)
- Harald Heide-Steen Jr. as Dynamite-Harry

=== Spin-offs ===
The Danish TV series showing the gang during their childhood, Olsen-bandens første kup, was remade in Norway as Olsenbandens første kupp. There has also been made an entire feature film series, Olsenbanden Jr., with six films from 2003 to 2010, inspired by the Swedish Lilla Jönssonligan.

== Legacy ==
=== Denmark ===
The Nordisk Film Studios in Valby hosts a small Olsen Gang Museum. A sculpture of The Olsen Gang was unveiled at Valby Ringsted in July 2025. The sculpture was created by Theo Larsen and cast in Florence. The road outside the former Vridsløselille Prison was renmaed Egon Olsens Vej (Egon Olsen's Road; later changed to Egon Olsens Allé/Egon Olsens Avenue) in 2004.

=== Germany ===
The dubbed versions of the series have also enjoyed great popularity in the former GDR and can still be seen regularly on regional television stations. More than 3000 people are members of the German Olsenbanden fan club. The stage name of Betterov, a musician from Thuringia, is a reference to the eponymous supporting character Betterøv in the series.

=== Norway ===
The popularity of the film series inspired a Norwegian restaurant chain, Egon, with the logo alluding to Egon Olsen's iconic hat and cigar.

Semic published five Norwegian comic albums featuring the Olsen Gang, eight original stories, starting with "Olsenbanden raner hurtigruta!" published in 1983.

In June 2019, the Norwegian Postal service issued two stamps to celebrate the first film's 50th anniversary. The domestic stamp depicts Egon leaving prison, which is the opening scene in most of the films. The European stamp shows the whole gang, including Harry and Valborg.

A road was also renamed Egon Olsens Allé in Islo in 2017.
