= Strike First Freddy =

1965 film

- US release film poster
- Directed by: Erik Balling
- Written by: Henning Bahs; Erik Balling; Bengt Janus
- Produced by: Bo Christensen
- Starring: Morten Grunwald
- Cinematography: Arne Abrahamsen; Jørgen Skov
- Music by: Bent Fabricius-Bjerre
- Production company: Commonwealth United (US)
- Distributed by: Nordisk Film
- Release date: 21 December 1965
- Running time: 100 minutes
- Country: Denmark
- Language: Danish

Strike First Freddy (Danish: Slå først Frede!) is a 1965 Danish spy comedy film directed by Erik Balling and starring Morten Grunwald as Frede. The film was released in US as Operation Lovebirds. The film won the Bodil Award for Best Danish Film and Poul Bundgaard won the Bodil Award for Best Actor in a Supporting Role for his role as Kolick. It was followed by the sequel Relax Freddie in 1966.

== Plot ==
Freddy Hansen, a game salesman, is mistaken for a secret service agent on a ferry and suddenly finds himself in the middle of a dangerous game that could trigger another World War.

== Cast ==
- Morten Grunwald as Agent Frede Hansen
- Ove Sprogøe as Agent Smith
- Poul Bundgaard as Kolick
- Essy Persson as Sonja, a stripper
- Martin Hansen as Dr. Pax

== See also ==
- Kulla Agent 000, 1972 Indian remake
