= Scandinavian Golf Club =

Golf Club in Denmark

The Scandinavian Golf Club
- Location within Denmark
- 55.835°N 12.340°E

Club information
- Location: Near Farum, Denmark
- Tota holes: 2 x 18

The Scandinavian Golf Club is a venue for golfers with two 18-hole courses (Old & New Course) designed by American Robert Trent Jones II. The club house was designed by Henning Larsen Architects. The location - previously a clay pit and for the latest 60 years - a military practice area, is situated just north of Farum, Furesø Municipality, Denmark

== Construction ==
The golf courses are located in the former training grounds of Farum Barracks. It was established by Peter Frithjof Bang, Torben Wind and Jesper Balser, who after having sold the IT company Navision bought the 200+ hectare area in 2002. After four years of negotiating with the local community RTJ II with president and principal designer Bruce Charlton spent the following four years to develop two sand capped golf courses with more than 100 km of drainage, 2000 irrigation heads all fed from surface water in large lakes on just 25 percent of the exceptional area packed with fauna og flora. Rain will not stop play as the drain will carry away up to 100 millimeters of water per hour.

== The facilities ==
Old Course opened in 2010 and New Course followed one year later. Golf Digest, USA, have recently analyzed 206 countries in the world to find the best courses, and in Denmark New Course is ranked #1 and Old Course #2. Golf World, UK, states that The Scandinavian is the only golf venue in Europe with both courses ranked in Top 50. Besides the courses there is a driving range with the possibility of playing in different wind directions. A large short game area is located next to covered bays with TrackMan gear free of use for the Members of the club. Four large putting greens is accessible close to the first and 10th teeboxes of both courses.

The award-winning club house stands on a small plateau. Its most distinctive feature is the sculptural roof, which relies on traditional Scandinavian stave churches for inspiration. The materials used are mainly Douglas-Pine, slate, glass and Tombak.

== Cultural references ==
Egon (Ove Sprogøe) hands a stolen Ming vase over to a client at hole 17 of the Scandinavian Golf Course at 0:17:06 in the 1978 Olsen-banden film The Olsen Gang Sees Red.
