= Pål Johannessen =

Norwegian child actor (1959–2024)

- Born: 11 February 1959
- Died: 17 May 2024 (aged 65); Sandefjord, Norway
- Years active: 1966–1976, 1999

Pål Johannessen (11 February 1959 – 17 May 2024) was a Norwegian child actor.

== Life and career ==
Johannessen was born on 11 February 1959. He was most famous for the role of Basse in the Norwegian Olsenbanden films, though he started off in the film The African in 1966. After leaving the Olsen Gang films in 1976, he quit acting, but made a small cameo in the final Olsen Gang film, Olsenbandens siste stikk (1999), which is the only film Johannessen appeared in as an adult.

According to Arve Opsahl, who played lead character Egon Olsen in the films, he and co-star Sverre Holm showed up unannounced on Johannessen's door, and refused to leave until he agreed to appear in the 1999 film. After a brief stalemate, he agreed.

Johannessen died in Sandefjord on 17 May 2024 due to a heart attack, at the age of 65.

== Filmography ==
- Olsenbandens siste stikk (1999) as Basse
- Olsenbanden for full musikk (1976) as Basse
- Olsenbandens siste bedrifter (1975) as Basse
- Olsenbanden møter kongen & knekten (1974) as Basse
- Olsenbanden og Dynamitt-Harry går amok (1973) as Basse
- Olsenbanden tar gull (1972) as Basse
- Olsenbanden og Dynamitt-Harry (1970) as Birger
- Olsenbanden Operasjon Egon (1969) as Basse
- The African (1966) as Lillebror
