= Knud Hilding =

Danish actor (1921–1975)

- Born: 21 November 1921; Copenhagen, Denmark
- Died: 14 September 1975 (aged 53); Denmark
- Occupation: Actor
- Years active: 1955–1975

Knud Hilding (21 November 1921 – 14 September 1975) was a Danish film actor. Hilding was born in Copenhagen on 21 November 1921.

After graduating from the Frederiksberg Theatre School, Hilding was then employed at the Aarhus Theatre and appeared in several Copenhagen theatres after that. For a while he appeared as Pierrot in Pantomime Theatre in Tivoli. OnTV he appeared in the series Huset på Christianshavn and Livsens ondskab, amongst others.

He appeared in 29 films between 1955 and 1975.

Hilding was married to actress Rinden Anne Grete Hilding. He is buried at the Bispebjerg Cemetery in Copenhagen.

== Filmography ==
- Olsen-banden på sporet (1975)
- Olsen-bandens sidste bedrifter (1974)
- Natten i ventesalen (1974)
- Olsen-banden går amok (1973)
- Rejsekammeraten (1972)
- Manden på Svanegården (1972)
- Olsen-bandens store kup (1972)
- Den forsvundne fuldmægtig (1971)
- Til lykke Hansen (1971)
- Erotik (1971)
- Ballade på Christianshavn (1971)
- Rend mig i revolutionen (1970)
- Mig og min lillebror og Bølle (1969)
- Klabautermannen (1969)
- Tænk på et tal (1969)
- Min søsters børn vælter byen (1968)
- Olsen-banden (1968)
- Mig og min lillebror og storsmuglerne (1968)
- Det var en lørdag aften (1968)
- I den grønne skov (1968)
- Mig og min lillebror (1967)
- Flagermusen (1966)
- En ven i bolignøden (1965)
- Alt for kvinden (1964)
- Svinedrengen og prinsessen på ærten (1962)
- Sømænd og svigermødre (1962)
- Valg (1962)
- Over alle grænser (1958)
- Ild og jord (1955)
