= Vridsløselille Prison =

Former state prison in Copenhagen, Denmark

Vridsløselille Prison Vridsløselille Fængsel
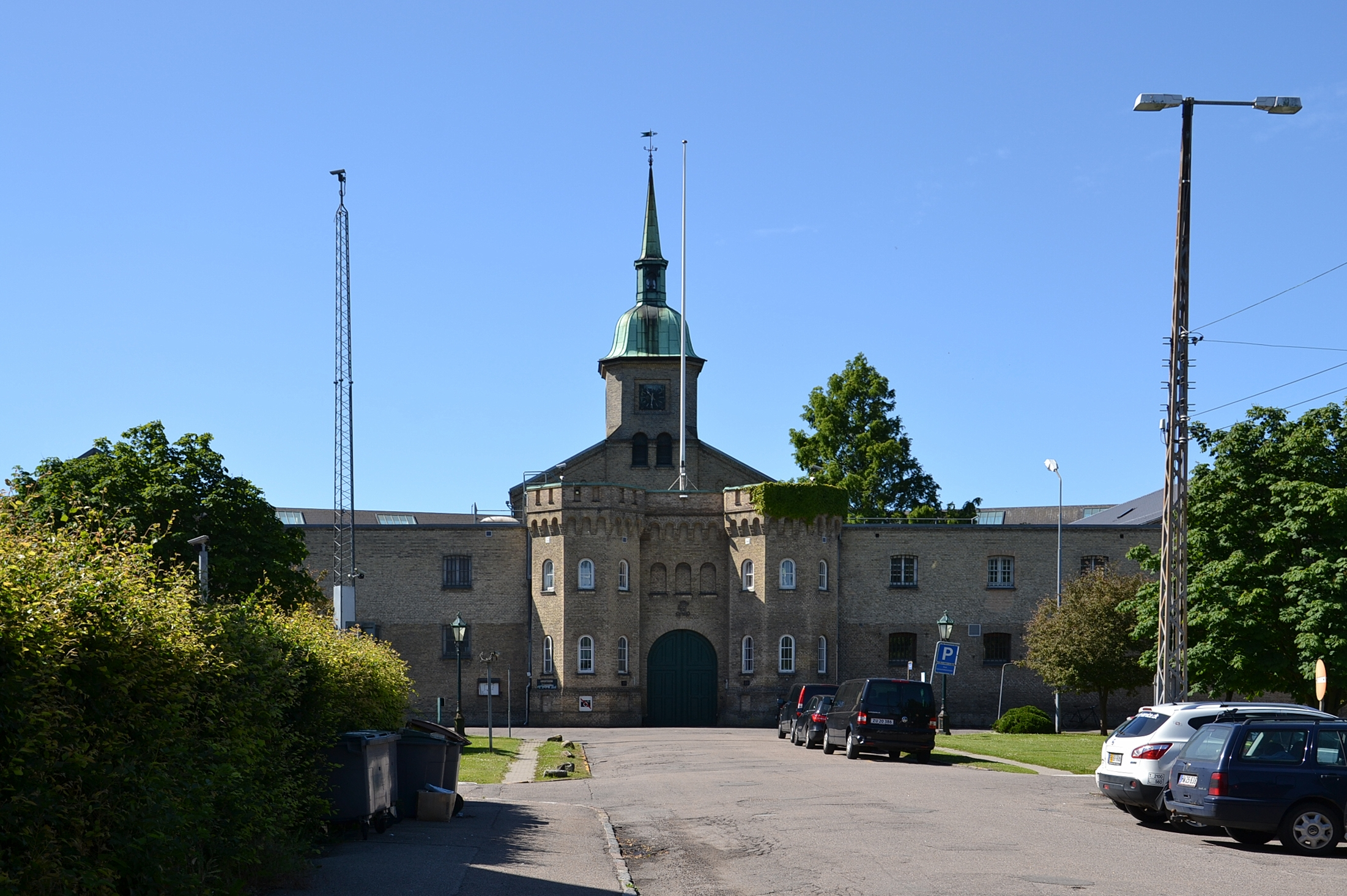
- The main entrance
- Interactive map of Vridsløselille Prison; Vridsløselille Fængsel
- Location: Fængselsvej 39, 2620 Albertslund; 55°39′35.1″N 12°20′51.3″E
- Opened: 1859
- Closed: 1 February 2016
- Former name: Statsfængslet i Vridsløselille

Vridsløselille Prison (Danish: Vridsløselille Fængsel) is a former state prison located in Albertslund in the western suburbs of Copenhagen in Denmark. It was operated as a state prison from its opening in 1859 to January 2016 and then served as a special departure center for rejected asylum seekers with prison sentences until February 2018.

The prison was used for the enforcement of imprisonment and execution of arrests and had a total of 241 inmates. The State Prison in Vridsløselille was a closed prison facility for men over the age of 23. It was replaced by Storstrøm Prison on the isle of Falster, which was opened in 2017.

== History ==
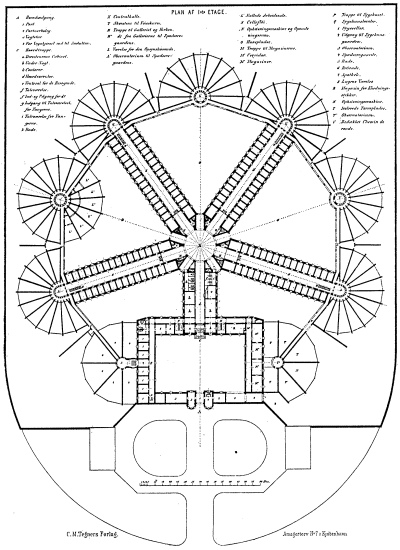
Plan of Vridsløselille Prison from 1859

The correctional facility opened as Forbedringshuset på Vridsløselille Mark in 1859. It was designed in accordance with the so-called "Philadelphia System". This system involved complete isolation of prisoners around the clock with the aim that they should have time and opportunity to repent their sins and reconcile themselves with God. All time was spent in jail cell - both work and free time. Prisoners were only allowed outside their cells while wearing a mask, rendering them unrecognisable to other prisoners. This method was maintained until 1924, after which it was optional to be masked. No conversation or contact between prisoners was allowed. At the prison school and church the prisoners were placed in small bays, so they could see the teachers or the priest - but not each other.

The isolation principle was maintained well into the 1900s at the State Prison in Vridsløselille.

In the early 2010s, it was decided to close Vridsløselille Prison in favour of a new state prison on the island of Falster. The removal of prisoners from Vridsløselille, after being originally planned for 2017, started in November 2015 and was completed in January 2016. The new Storstrøm Prison opened on 30 October 2017. Vridsløselille Prison was converted into a departure center for rejected asylum seekers with prison sentences. It closed on 1 February 2018 .

=== Prison escapes ===
In the night of 12 to 13 December 2014, the 40-year-old Danish Brian Bo Larsen escaped from the prison, making it his 20th prison escape. He fled through the window, after sawing off the bars. After reaching the roof of the prison by climbing a rope from his window, he used a second rope to leave the confines of the prison.

=== Possible human rights abuses ===
In January 2016, a young man was subjected to belt restraint in a solitary confinement for nine days, before being transferred to Herstedvester Prison. There, he died shortly thereafter. The case, kept from public knowledge by the Danish Prison and Probation Service for over two years, has raised serious concerns about potential violations of human rights. UN human rights expert Jens Modvig suggested that the prolonged restraint could constitute inhumane treatment or even torture.

Also in 2016, the Danish Institute for Human Rights noted "general concern at the conditions in which detained foreign nationals were held [at Vridsløselille], including lack of information, communication and human contact".

== The Olsen Gang ==
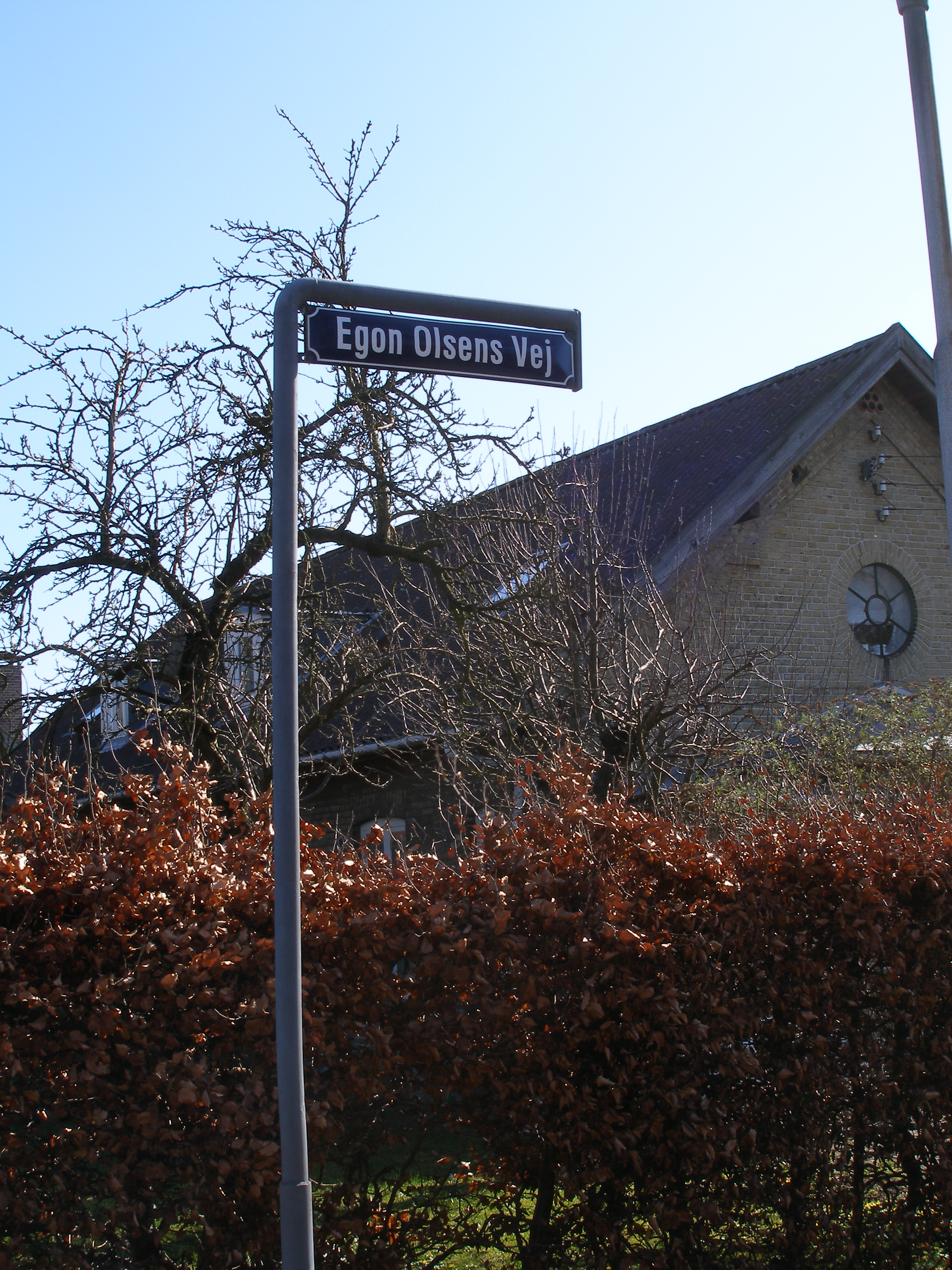
Street name

The State Prison in Vridsløselille is known through Erik Balling's movies about The Olsen Gang (Danish: Olsen Banden). Almost all the movies begin and end in front of the prison's main entrance.

When the actor behind the series' protagonist, Ove Sprogøe, died in September 2004 people began talking about whether the road then named Fængselsvej (Prison Road) between Roskildevej and the prison should be renamed after Ove Sprogøe's famous character from the movies, Egon Olsen. After some debate back and forth the name was changed to Egon Olsen Road (Danish: Egon Olsens Vej) by the Municipality of Albertslund. On 21 December 2004, Sprogøe's 85th birthday, the name was officially put in use by the public.
