= Huset på Christianshavn =

- Genre: Comedy
- Created by: Erik Balling; Tom Hedengaard; Ebbe Langberg
- Starring: Arthur Jensen; Poul Reichhardt; Bodil Udsen; Helle Virkner; Paul Hagen; Kirsten Walther
- Music by: Steen Holkenov
- Country of origin: Denmark
- Original language: Danish
- No. of seasons: 14
- No. of episodes: 84

Production
- Running time: 20–35 minutes

Original release
- Network: DR
- Release: 16 May 1970 – 31 December 1977

Huset på Christianshavn (The House at Christianshavn) was an 84-part television comedy series broadcast in Denmark between 1970 and 1977. The 84 episodes were spread across 14 seasons. The series was produced by the Nordisk Film company for the national broadcasting corporation, DR. 48 of the episodes were also shown in the German Democratic Republic on DFF.

The series portrayed the lives of the residents of a block of flats in Christianshavn, an old part of Copenhagen.

== Cast ==
- Poul Reichhardt (Olsen)
- Helle Virkner (Mrs. Ellen Olsen)
- Jes Holtsø (William Olsen)
- Paul Hagen (Clausen)
- Lis Løwert (Mrs. Mille Clausen)
- Finn Storgaard (Tue)
- Kirsten Hansen-Møller (Rikke)
- Willy Rathnov (Egon Hansen)
- Kirsten Walther (Karla Hansen)
- Flemming Nielsen ("Bimmer", Karla's baby boy)
- Ove Sprogøe (Larsen)
- Arthur Jensen (Arnold Hannibal Meyer)
- Bodil Udsen (Emma)
- Claus Ryskjær Bo
- Karen Berg (Mrs. Dagmar Hammerstedt)
