= Henrik Koefoed =

Danish actor

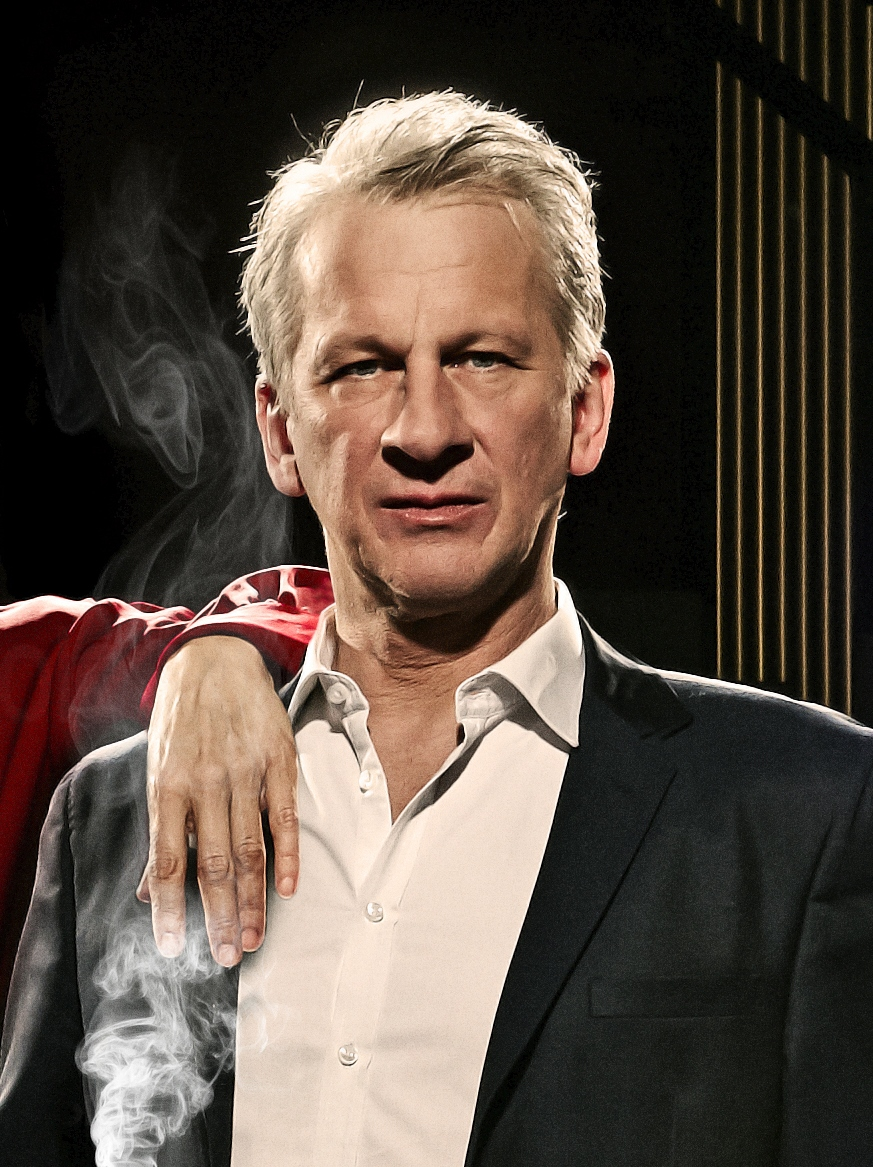
- Born: 25 November 1955 (age 70); Kalvehave, Denmark
- Occupation: Actor
- Years active: 1979-present

Henrik Koefoed (born Jensen; 25 November 1955) is a Danish actor of stage and screen. He is also known for his role as Yassirfir Dosirfem in the musical/comedy group Ørkenens Sønner ("Sons of the Desert").

== Early life and education ==
Henrik Koefoed was born on 25 November 1955 in Kalvehave, South Jutland. His parents, Paul Jensen and Grethe Koefoed Jensen (born Johnsen), owned a large hotel there, called Hotel Færgegaarden.

He joined Prince Jørgen's Garde in Vordingborg at the age of eight, where he learnt to play the flute and trombone, until he was 16. Wanting to be a classical musician, he lived with one of his sisters in Rødovre for a while working in a music shop, then moved home and took a job at a leather goods factory in Vordingborg from November 1972 to January 1973. He then moved to the city of Aalborg, where he lived with his eldest sister, a school teacher, for a while. He attended the music conservatory for couple of years from 1974, but failed the entrance exams to study the trombone, so turned to drama.

In 1976 Koefoed joined the choir for Preben Neergaard's production of Annie Get Your Gun at Aalborg Theatre. After he failed the trombone exam in the summer of 1976, he got work at the theatre and performed with Karen-Lise Mynster. He was educated at the Danish National Theatre School in the years 1977-80.

He attended the National Theatre School in Copenhagen.

== Career ==
In 1978 Koefoed performed in the summer revue Mandefald at Bristol Theatre in Copenhagen in 1978 and the cabaret performance Vi længes sikkert mod noget andet ("We are probably longing for something else") at Husets Teater.

He became widely known when in 1979 he played the lead role in the film Rend mig i traditionerne. He continued to act on stage, both in Copenhagen touring the country. He has also been a voice actor for several cartoons. In 1985 he appeared as an angel in the film Når engle elsker ("When Angels Love").

In 1992, along with Ulf Pilgaard and Claus Ryskjær, Koefoed appeared in one of the annual revue shows in Cirkusrevyen.

His most famous role is perhaps that of Yassirfir Dosirfem in the musical/comedy group Ørkenens Sønner ("Sons of the Desert"), along with Søren Pilmark, Niels Olsen, and Asger Reher, who performed at the Bellevue Theatre for a number of years.

== Recognition and honours ==
- 1999: Knight of the Dannebrog
- 2009: Knight of the 1st degree of Dannebrog

== Personal life ==
Koefoed married music teacher Helle Susanne Rosenørn on 24 May 1986.

== Selected filmography ==
Year	Title	Role	Notes
1988	Katinka	Bensten	
1998	The Olsen Gang's Last Trick	Holm Hansen Jr.	
2004	Brothers	Bar Man	
2008	Journey to Saturn	Alien Researcher	
