= Sundborg =

Sundborg is a Scandinavian surname. Notable people with the surname include:

- Åke Sundborg (1921–2007), Swedish geomorphologist
- Stephen Sundborg (born 1943), American Jesuit and theologian
- Solveig Sundborg (1910–2002), Danish film actress
