= Olsen-banden Junior =

2001 Danish film by Peter Flinth

- English poster
- Directed by: Peter Flinth
- Written by: Anne-Marie Olesen; Lars Mering; Nikolaj Scherfig
- Produced by: Thomas Heinesen
- Starring: Aksel Leth; Christian Stoltenberg; Jakob A. Bernit; Signe Lerche
- Music by: Bent Fabricius-Bjerre
- Distributed by: Nordisk Film
- Release date: 14 December 2001
- Running time: 85 minutes
- Country: Denmark
- Language: Danish

Olsen-banden Junior is a 2001 Danish family-comedy heist film. It is a prequel to the long running Danish film series Olsen-banden, and is based on a concept previously used in the Swedish Olsen-banden remake prequel series Lilla Jönssonligan. The film is also a sequel to the Christmas calendar Olsen-bandens første kup from 1999. The film premiered on December 14, 2001. The film was a moderate success compared to the original series and the Swedish and Norwegian equivalents. The film later received a novelization of the same name.

== Plot ==
In the year of 1958, Egon Olsen, the child genius, tries to escape the orphanage where he lives by setting himself up to be adopted by a rich couple. Problems arise when it turns out that the couple are rocket scientists who want to use him as a test subject to be sent into space.

== Cast ==
- Aksel Leth as Egon Olsen
- Christian Stoltenberg as Benny
- Jacob A. Bernit as Kjeld
- Signe Lerche as Yvonne
- Sebastian Jessen]as Kenneth
- Jesper Langberg as Hallandsen
- Ellen Hillingsø as Doctor Rakowski
- Christina Stojanovich as Inge-Margrethe
- Henrik Lykkegaard as Holm
- Claus Bue as Crime Assistant Jensen
- Claus Ryskjær as Manager
- Ole Thestrup as Major Schröder
- Lasse Lunderskov as Wasteman
- Henning Sprogøe as Mister Olsen

== Reception ==
The film was released on home video by June 2002. It premiered on television on April 2, 2003. After the film there were more Junior installments in the Olsen-banden franchise and the next films are animated.
