= Relax Freddie =

1966 film

- Directed by: Erik Balling
- Written by: Henning Bahs; Erik Balling; Bengt Janus
- Produced by: Bo Christensen
- Starring: Morten Grunwald
- Cinematography: Arne Abrahamsen; Jørgen Skov
- Production company: Commonwealth United
- Distributed by: Nordisk Film
- Release date: 7 October 1966
- Running time: 105 minutes
- Country: Denmark
- Language: Danish

Relax Freddie (Danish: Slap af, Frede!) is a 1966 Danish comedy film directed by Erik Balling and starring Morten Grunwald and Ove Sprogøe. It is a sequel to Strike first, Freddy!

== Cast ==
- Morten Grunwald as Frede Hansen
- Ove Sprogøe as Agent Smith
- Erik Mørk as Presto
- Hanne Borchsenius as Diana
- Clara Pontoppidan as Mamma
- Dirch Passer as Fettucino
- Carl Ottosen as Spinoza
- Asbjørn Andersen as Chefen
- Kristopher Kum as Dr. Ling Fu
- Freddy Koch as Embedsmanden
- Poul Thomsen as Gonzarles
- Gunnar Strømvad as Enrico
- André Sallyman as Luigi
- Bjørn Spiro as Leonardo
- Bent Thalmay as Benjamino
- Preben Mahrt as Portieren
- John Wittig as Agent I
