= The Veterinarian's Adopted Children =

1968 film

- Directed by: Carl Ottosen
- Written by: Carl Ottosen
- Produced by: Henrik Sandberg
- Starring: Dirch Passer
- Cinematography: Gustaf Mandal
- Edited by: Knud Hauge
- Music by: Sven Gyldmark
- Release date: 29 November 1968
- Running time: 102 minutes
- Country: Denmark
- Language: Danish

The Veterinarian's Adopted Children (Danish: Dyrlægens plejebørn) is a 1968 Danish comedy film directed by Carl Ottosen and starring Dirch Passer and Ove Sprogøe.

== Cast ==
- Dirch Passer - Dyrlæge Linsager
- Ove Sprogøe - Dr. Louis Hansen
- Judy Gringer - Birgitte
- Carl Ottosen - Dr. Linsager
- Karl Stegger - Carl Nielsen
- Susanne Bruun-Koppel - Dorte Nielsen
- Folmer Rubæk - Niels
- Else Petersen - Fru Eriksen
- Axel Strøbye - Benny
- Lone Hertz - Kirsten
- Winnie Mortensen - Winnie
- Lise Henningsen - Fru Andersen
- Poul Glargaard - Erik Olsson
- Miskow Makwarth - Ole
- Lise Thomsen - Ane
- Mogens Brandt - Sagfører
- Helen Michelsen - Winnies mor
- Ellen Staal - Martha
- Holger Munk - Nyrespecialisten
