= Der er et yndigt land (film) =

1983 film

- Directed by: Morten Arnfred
- Written by: Morten Arnfred; Jørgen Ljungdahl
- Produced by: Morten Arnfred; Bent Fabricius-Bjerre; Henrik Lund
- Starring: Ole Ernst
- Cinematography: Dirk Brüel
- Edited by: Anders Refn
- Release date: 11 February 1983
- Running time: 106 minutes
- Country: Denmark
- Language: Danish

Der er et yndigt land is a 1983 Danish drama film directed by Morten Arnfred. It was entered into the 33rd Berlin International Film Festival, where it won an Honourable Mention.

== Cast ==
- Ole Ernst as Knud
- Karen-Lise Mynster as Katrine
- Anna Vallgårda as Anna
- Ricki Rasmussen as Søren
- Ingolf David as Vilhelm
- Arne Hansen as Poul
- Reimer Bo Christensen as Tom
- Gyrd Løfquist as Willy
- Blanche Funch as Estrid
- Finn Nielsen as Svineavlskonsulenten Bjarne
- Stig Hoffmeyer as Bankbestyrer
- Erik Thygesen as Karlsen
- Ole Meyer as Svend
- Margrethe Koytu as Inga
- Esben Høilund Carlsen as Dyrlæge
- Henning Jensen as Dyrlægen

== Accolades ==
The film won the 1983 Bodil Award for Best Danish Film.
