= Cirkus Buster =

1961 film by Erik Balling

Circus Buster
- Directed by: Erik Balling
- Written by: Buster Larsen
- Cinematography: Jørgen Skov
- Edited by: Birger Lind
- Release date: 1961
- Running time: 96 minutes
- Country: Denmark
- Language: Danish

Cirkus Buster is a 1961 Danish movie directed by Erik Balling. The film is based on a TV show with the same name.

== Cast ==
- Buster Larsen as Cirkusdirektør and the clown Buster
- Helle Virkner as Jasmine
- Viggo Brodthagen as him self
- Ole Wisborg
- Palle Huld
- Tommy Kenter
- Karl Stegger
- Inger Stender
- Mogens Brandt
