= Anton Kontra =

Hungarian-Danish violinist (1932–2020)

- Born: March 29, 1932; Tomajmonostora, Hungary
- Died: May 8, 2020 (aged 88); Malmö, Sweden
- Genres: Classical, jazz
- Occupation(s): Violinist, concertmaster
- Instrument: Violin
- Labels: Dacapo Records, Naxos, Caprice Records, BIS

Anton Kontra (born 29 March 1932 in Tomajmonostora, Hungary; died 8 May 2020 in Malmö, Sweden) was a Hungarian-Danish violinist, concertmaster and leading soloist in the Scandinavian countries.

== Career ==
Born into a Romani family, Anton Kontra began playing the violin at the age of five. His musical talent soon revealed itself, and at the age of ten he began to study music theory at the Franz Liszt Academy of Music under the tutelage of Zoltán Kodály. Kontra went on to study with Ede Zathureczky, winning prizes at the International Johann Sebastian Bach Competition and the Henryk Wieniawski Violin Competition.

Kontra's early career stalled with the defeat of the Hungarian Revolution of 1956. He emigrated to Sweden, played for the first time in Gypsy bands, as did many of his compatriots, and won seats with the Copenhagen Philharmonic and, in 1965, the New Zealand Symphony Orchestra.

Kontra was a versatile musician who played jazz with the Danish bassist Niels-Henning Ørsted Pedersen—their collaboration is preserved on video. Moreover, from 1965 to 1988 Kontra served as concertmaster of the Zealand Symphony Orchestra, also called Copenhagen Philharmonic Orchestra, and after that in Malmö Symphony Orchestra, and he made a cameo appearance in the 1972 film The Olsen Gang's Big Score. In 1973, with Morten Zeuthen, Boris Samsing and Peter Fabricius, Kontra founded the influential Kontra Quartet, one of Denmark's leading ensembles. Kontra recorded many works by Danish composers, amongst them Per Nørgård, whose Violin Concerto No. 1, "Helle Nacht", is one of the highlights in Kontra's discography. He performed Vittorio Monti's Csárdás, accompanied by improvisational pianist-comedian Victor Borge.
