= Jes Holtsø =

Danish actor and singer

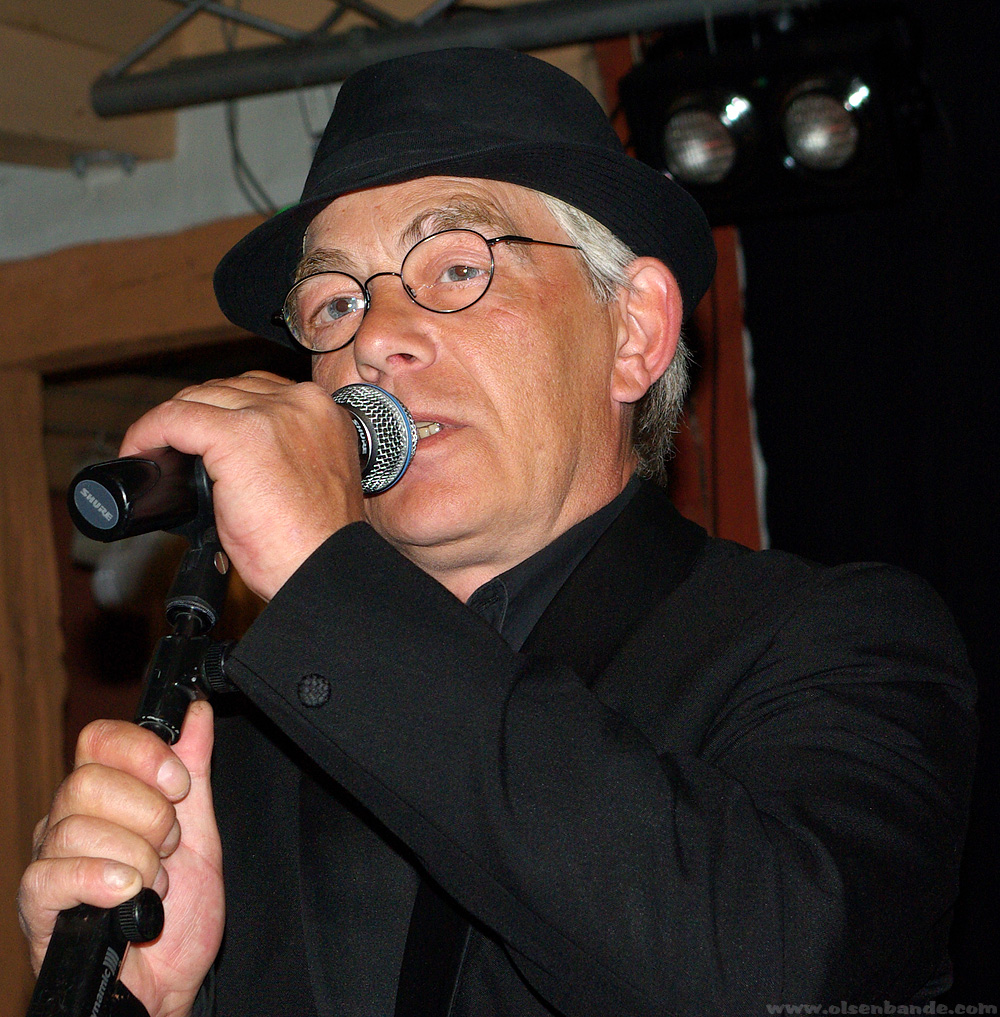
- Jes Holtsø 2013
- Born: 30 December 1956 (age 69); Copenhagen, Denmark
- Known for: The Olsen Gang

Jes Holtsø (born 30 December 1956) is a Danish actor most notable for his role as Kjeld's son Børge in the Olsen-banden films. The reason that he was chosen to play Børge was actually his thick glasses, which became his characteristic. Later he played the Olsens' son (unrelated to the Olsen Gang), William Olsen in the Danish television series Huset på Christianshavn from 1970 to 1977 and the film based on the series Ballade på Christianshavn in 1971. As an adult Holtsø never pursued acting, though he did take part in the last Olsen Gang film, The Olsen Gang's Last Trick, as the adult Børge.

After having been a drug-addict and alcoholic for much of his youth, Holtsø is now clean, and has, himself, worked at an institution to help addicts. Since 2002, Holtsø has worked as a theater technician at the Royal Danish Theatre.

In 2009, Holtsø competed as a singer in the Danish counterpart of Britain's Got Talent, after which he released an album. In 2012, he released the album Big Easy with lyrics and music by Morten Wittrock and Ray Weaver. The album received 5 stars in Berlingske and Holtsø was awarded Danish Blues Name 2012.

== Filmography ==
- The Olsen Gang (1968)
- The Olsen Gang in a Fix (1969)
- Diary of a Teenager (Stine og drengene) (1969)
- Huset på Christianshavn (1970–77, TV-series)
- The Olsen Gang in Jutland (1971)
- Ballade på Christianshavn (1971)
- The Olsen Gang's Big Score (1972)
- The Olsen Gang Goes Crazy (1973)
- The Last Exploits of the Olsen Gang (1974)
- The Olsen Gang on the Track (1975)
- The Olsen Gang Sees Red (1976)
- The Olsen Gang Never Surrenders (1979)
- The Olsen Gang's Last Trick (1998)

== Bibliography ==
- Jes Holtsø (12 April 2011). Verden venter (in Danish). Lindhardt og Ringhof. ISBN 978-87-11-40011-1.
