= Lily Weiding =

Danish actress (1924–2021)

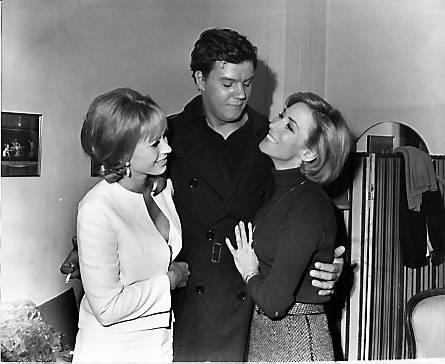
- Lily Weiding (right) alongside Hanne Borchsenius (left) and Morten Grunwald (centre) in 1966
- Born: 22 October 1924; Frederiksberg, Denmark
- Died: 15 June 2021 (aged 96); Copenhagen, Denmark
- Occupation: Actress
- Years active: 1942–2008
- Spouse(s): Morten Grunwald (1961–2018; his death)

Lily Weiding (22 October 1924 – 15 June 2021) was a Danish actress. She appeared in more than 30 films and television shows from 1942 to 2008. She starred in the film Be Dear to Me, which was entered into the 7th Berlin International Film Festival. Weiding died in June 2021 at the age of 96.

== Selected filmography ==
- Tyrannens fald (1942)
- Lady with the Light Gloves (1942)
- De kloge og vi gale (1945)
- The Swedenhielm Family (1947)
- Be Dear to Me (1957)
- Tre må man være (1959)
- Martha (1967)
