= We Are All Demons =

1969 film

- Directed by: Henning Carlsen
- Written by: Henning Carlsen; Poul Borum; Aksel Sandemose
- Produced by: Henning Carlsen; Bo Christensen
- Starring: Lise Fjeldstad
- Cinematography: Jørgen Skov
- Edited by: Leif Erlsboe
- Distributed by: Nordisk Film
- Release date: 27 June 1969
- Running time: 98 minutes
- Countries: Denmark; Sweden; Norway
- Language: Danish

We Are All Demons (Danish: Klabautermanden) is a 1969 Danish drama film directed by Henning Carlsen. The film is based on the 1932 novel "Klabautermanden" by Aksel Sandemose. It was entered into the 19th Berlin International Film Festival.

== Cast ==
- Lise Fjeldstad - Inger
- Hans Stormoen - Asbjørn Bauta
- Claus Nissen - Asthor Asbjörnsen
- Allan Edwall - Tor, the diseased seaman
- Peter Lindgren - First Mate
- Gunnar Strømvad - crew member
- Knud Hilding - crew
- Jørgen Langebæk - crew
- Erling Dalsborg - The Jew
- Ole Søgaard - Klaus Bornholmeren
- Torben Færch - Yngste lettmatros
- Ove Pedersen - Skipsgutten
- Margit Carlqvist - nurse
- Flemming Dyjak - Esbjørn
- Ole Larsen - customs officer
- Kim Andersen - Inger's son Arnor
