= Solveig Sundborg =

Danish actress

- Born: 14 March 1910; Copenhagen, Denmark
- Died: 22 July 2002 (aged 92); Denmark
- Occupation: Actress
- Years active: 1932–1994

Solveig Augusta Maria Sundborg (14 March 1910 – 22 July 2002) was a Danish film actress. She appeared in 23 films between 1932 and 1994.

She was born in Copenhagen, Denmark and died in Denmark.

== Selected filmography ==
- Han, hun og Hamlet (1932)
- Det støver stadig (1962)
- Love Thy Neighbour (1967)
- The Olsen Gang (1968)
- Hooray for the Blue Hussars (1970)
- The Olsen Gang's Big Score (1972)
