= Peter Steen =

Danish actor (1936–2013)

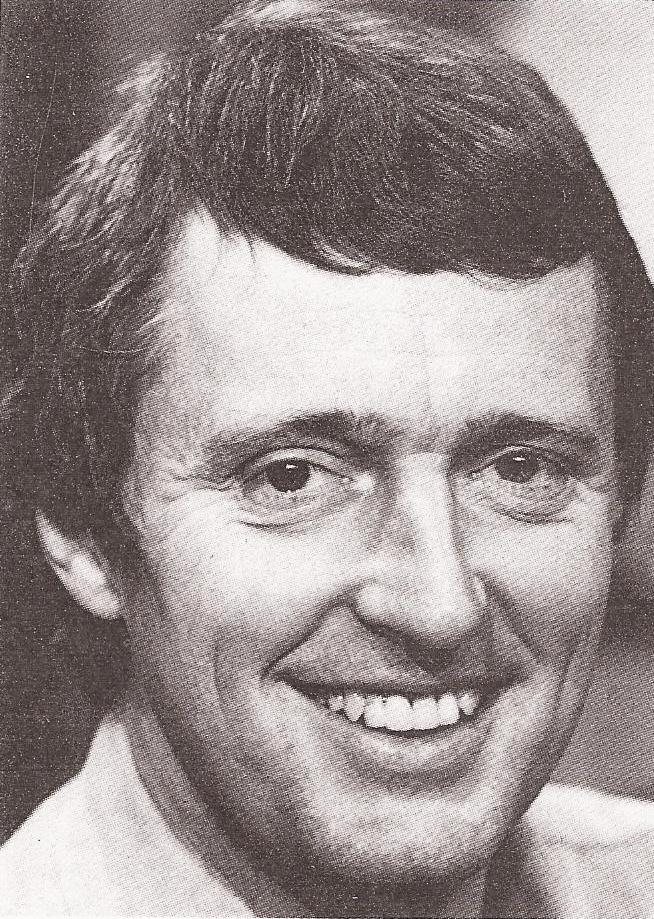
- Born: 22 January 1936; Randers, Denmark
- Died: 7 February 2013 (aged 77); Aarsdale, Bornholm
- Occupation: Actor
- Years active: 1964–2013

Peter Steen (22 January 1936 – 7 February 2013) was a Danish film actor. Steen was born in Randers, Denmark, and appeared in over 50 films from 1964 onwards. In 2004 Steen won a Bodil Award as best supporting actor for the 2003 film Arven (The Inheritance).

== Selected filmography ==
- To (1964)
- Der var engang (1966)
- Pigen og greven (1966)
- Neighbours (1966)
- Story of Barbara (1967)
- The Olsen Gang (1968)
- The Olsen Gang in a Fix (1969)
- The Olsen Gang in Jutland (1971)
- Lenin, You Rascal, You (1972)
- The First Circle (1973)
- Going for Broke (1977)
- Crash (1984) TV-series
- Arven (2003)
- Min søsters børn i Ægypten (2004)
- Young Andersen (2005)
