= Prisons in Denmark =

Prisons in Denmark are classified in the following categories: state prisons, local prisons, as well as the Western Prison in Copenhagen. State prisons may be closed, semi-open, and open. In local prisons and in the Western Prison many rules are the same as in closed state prisons. A closed prison has more staff and control than an open prison and has stricter rules about money, telephone calls, visits, etc. For example, inmate's letters from closed state prisons are usually checked before being posted, with the exception of letters from and to certain higher authorities. In open state prisons, letters are usually not checked. It is illegal for visitors to bring a cell phone to a closed prison.
