= Claus Ryskjær =

Danish actor (1945–2016)

Claus Ryskjær (26 June 1945 – 12 December 2016) was a Danish actor active from 1966 to 2008.

== Selected filmography ==
- Fun in the Streets (1969)
- The Egborg Girl (1969)
- The Olsen Gang's Big Score (1972)
- Nu går den på Dagmar (1972)
- Robin Hood (1973; Danish dub)
- Huset på Christianshavn (1973–77; television)
- Familien Gyldenkål (1975)
- Jeppe på bjerget (1981)
- The Olsen Gang Long Gone (1981)
- The Fox and the Hound (1981; Danish dub)
- Peter No-Tail (1981; Danish dub)
- Valhalla (1986)
- Oliver & Company (1988; Danish dub)
- War of the Birds (1990)
- The Olsen Gang's Last Trick (1998)
- Olsen-banden Junior (2001)
