= Tommy Kenter =

Danish actor

Tommy Osvald Charlie Kenter (born 15 April 1950 in Copenhagen) is a Danish actor.

He had his debut already when he was 11 years old in Cirkus Buster, performing under the name Tommy Kanter. He later appeared as "fru Christoff" in the satirical TV-show Dansk Naturgas working together with Per Pallesen. He has performed in Dansk Melodi Grand Prix together with Lise Dandanel and Hanne Boel with his own song "Piano". He was played Kjeld Jensen in the Olsen-Gang film The Olsen Gang's Last Trick after the death of Poul Bundgaard during filming.

He has said that he only has one more role he needs to play before retiring as an actor, which is Molières Tartuffe

== Private life ==
In 2008 Kenter bought a thatched house on 200 m^{2} in Nærum north of Copenhagen for 7,65 mill DKK. In 2018 he tried to sell it for 8,25 mill. DKK., but house was not sold until December 2019. It was sold for 7,4 mill DKK

== Filmography ==
Below is a selection of roles from Tommy Kenter's career as an actor.

=== Film ===
Year	Title	Role	Notes
1961	Cirkus Buster	Hans Nielsen	
1966	Once There Was a War	Pupil	
1975	Girls at Arms	Fritz	
1975	Familien Gyldenkål	waiter	
1976	Julefrokosten	The cook Marius	
1977	Going for Broke	TV-interviewer	
1980	Attentat	Detective	
1980	Undskyld vi er her	Viggo	
1981	Kniven i hjertet	Postal worker	
1981	Slingrevalsen	Car salesman	
1981	Olsen-bandens flugt over plankeværket	Gravel pit worker	
1985	Walter og Carlo – op på fars hat	Criminal	
1986	Take it Easy	The bartender Victor	
1986	Mord i mørket	Ole Kok	
1987	Strit og Stumme		
1989	The Miracle in Valby	Svens father (voice)	
1990	Dance of the Polar Bears	Father	
1990	War of the Birds		
1998	I Wonder Who's Kissing You Now?	Sam	
1998	The Olsen Gang's Last Trick	Kjeld Jensen (stand-in for Poul Bundgaard)	
2000	Fruen på Hamre		
2001	Chop Chop	Anton	
2005	Allegro	professor Fromberg	
2007	Anja og Viktor – Brændende kærlighed	brandmajor Larsen	
2007	Hvordan vi slipper af med de andre?	The artist Ole	
2008	Det perfekte kup	kriminalinspektør Jansen	
2008	Anja og Viktor – i medgang og modgang	Larsen	
2010	Bob bob Bølle Bob – Alletiders helt	Chief of Police Quist	
2011	Noget i luften	Larsen	
2012	The Passion of Marie	Lawyer Lachmann	
2012	A Caretaker's Tale	Gregers	
2014	Krummerne – alt på spil	Caretaker Svendsen	
2016	Rosemarie og Gartnerens Hemmelighed		Norwegian film
2018	A Fortunate Man	Philip Salomon	Bille August-film
2019	Jagtsæson		
2019	Kollision	Harald	
2020	Into the Darkness (De forbandede år))		

=== Series ===
Year	Title	Role	Notes
1977–80	En by i provinsen	Detective Poulsen	episode 1–9
	Ude på noget		
1978	Ret beset	Per	episode 3
1982	Mille og Mikkel	drycleaner Madsen	
1982	Opfinderkontoret	Jørgensen	episode 1–6
1984	Niels Klim's Underground Travels	Qvamit	episode 3
1990–92	Parløb	narrator	episode 1–6
1992	Kald mig Liva	Hans Kauffmann "Kuf"	episode 2–4
1992	Skibet i skilteskoven		Christmas calendar
1993	Jul i Juleland	music	Christmas calendar
1994	Flemming og Berit	different roles	
1996	Charlot og Charlotte	Chief of Police Orson	
1998	Hjerteflimmer	himself	
1998	Sailor Moon		
2001–03	Langt fra Las Vegas	Casper's father	episode 32
2004–07	Krøniken(Better Times)	singer	
2008	Sommer	Anna's father	episode 15
2009–10	The Protectors (Danish TV series)	Jørgen Boas	
2011	Vild med dans	himself	Kenter and Marianne Eihilt was pair no. 3
2012	Live fra Bremen		season 6
2012–17	Rita (TV series)	schoolteacher Erik	episode 9–16
2016–19	Follow the Money (Danish TV series)	Helge Larsen	episode 15–20
2017	Below the Surface (Danish TV series)	Leon	episode 1
2018	Hånd i hånd	Tage	season 1, episode 1–7

=== Voiceacting (Cartoons) ===
Year	Title	Role	Notes
1961	One Hundred and One Dalmatians	Puppy	
1975	The Twelve Tasks of Asterix		
1987	Strit og Stumme(Dreaming of Paradise)	Blånæse	
1988	Oliver & Company	Fagin	
1990	War of the Birds	The owl	
1995	Aberne og det hemmelige våben	Weissmüller	
1998	A Bug's Life	Heimlich	
1998	H.C. Andersen og den skæve skygge	Meisling Öehlenschläger	
2000–02	Thomas & Friends	Narrator (Michael Angelis in the UK/Alec Baldwin in the US)	season 5 & 6
2000	Cirkeline – ost og kærlighed	Jordrotte	
2003	The Boy Who Wanted to Be a Bear	Raven	
2004	Garfield: The Movie		
2006	Garfield: A Tail of Two Kitties		
2006	Cars	Ramone	
2011	Cars 2	Ramone	
2012	Marco Macaco		
2013	Otto the Rhino	Chief of police	

=== Theatrical plays ===
Year	Theatre	Play	Role
1998	Østre Gasværk Teater	Slutspil	
2005 & 2006	Nørrebros Theater	Elling og Kjell Bjarne	
2007	Copenhagen Opera House	Matador musical	Larsen
2019	Det Ny Teater	Fiddler on the Roof	Tevye the Dairyman

== Discography ==
- 1982: Nattens sidste cigaret (Live album with Niels Jørgen Steen and others)
- 1990: Uden hat og briller

== Awards ==
- 1982 – Årets Dirch
- 1991 – Bodil Award for Best Actor in a Leading Role in the movie Dance of the Polar Bears
- 1991 – Robert for male leading role of the year in the movie Dance of the Polar Bears
- 1994 – Teaterpokalen
- 2002 – Bodil Award for Best Actor in a Supporting Role in the movie Chop Chop
