= Arve Opsahl =

Norwegian actor, singer and stand-up comedian

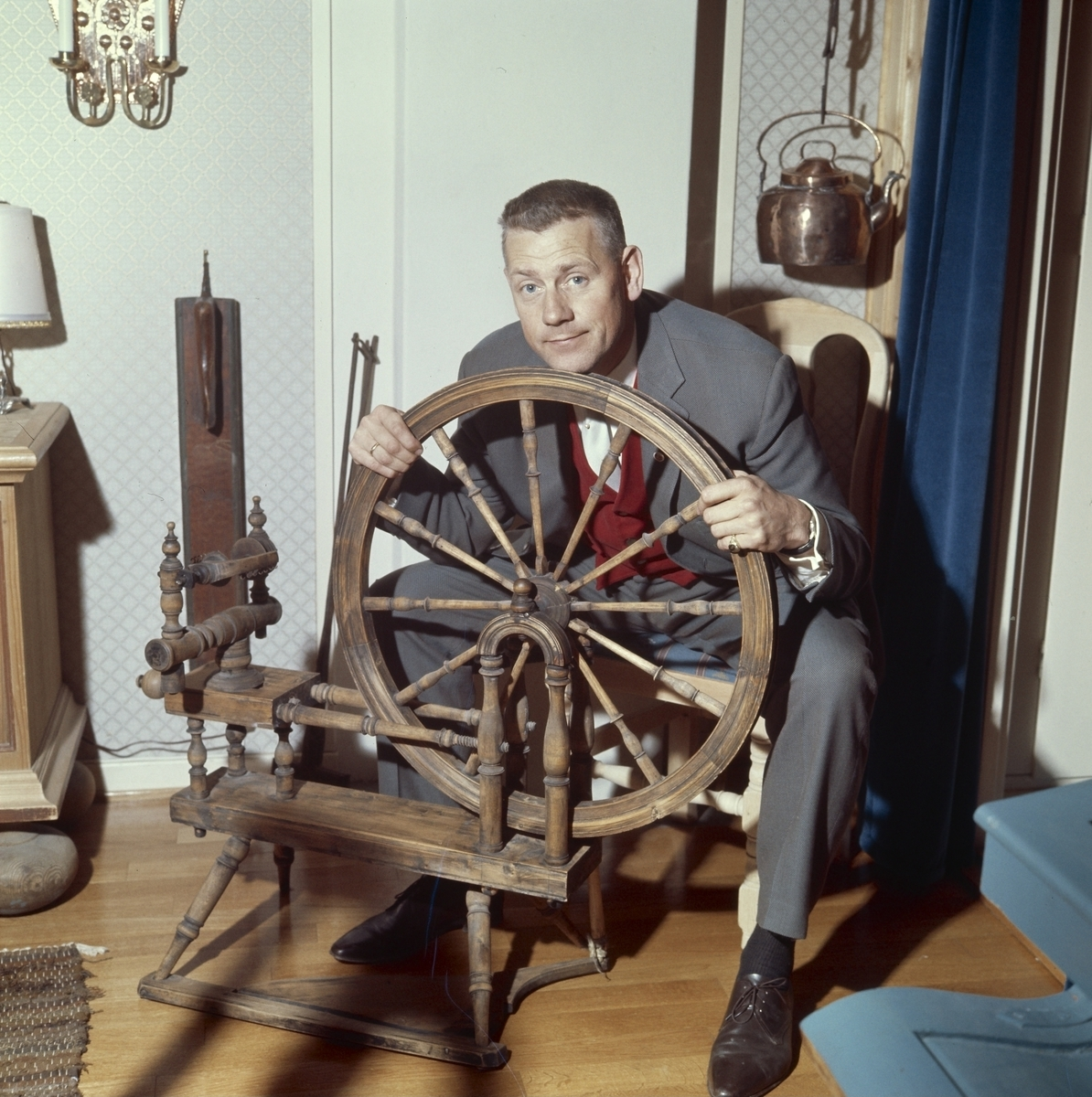
- Opsahl i 1963
- Born: 14 May 1921; Christiania
- Died: 29 April 2007; Oslo
- Occupation: Actor

Arve Opsahl (14 May 1921 – 29 April 2007) was a Norwegian movie and stage actor, singer and stand-up comedian.

Opsahl began his career as a comedian in 1942, and played numerous roles both on stage and in more than forty movies. He was then chosen to be the head of Olsenbanden, Egon Olsen. He played Egon Olsen in the first movie in 1969, and in all other 13 movies, until the last one in 1999. He is also well known for his role as the old man "Henry" in the Norwegian sitcom Mot i brøstet, airing from 1993 to 1997. He reprised the role for the reunion film Tusenårsfesten in 1999.

== Personal life ==
Opsahl married his wife Mary in 1945, but they were divorced soon after. He then married singer Liv Wilse, with whom he had a daughter, before they divorced in 1953. In 1954 he remarried his first wife, and they remained together until his death.

In 2002, Opsahl was honoured with a lifetime achievement award for his contributions to Norwegian comedy.

=== Health issues and death ===
Opsahl began struggling with his health during the 1990s, and at times it affected his job on "Mot I Brøstet", including a five-episode hiatus where he was at a spa center to treat his poor back, using pre-recorded inserts, to explain his absence. He had further absences during the last two years of the show. By 1999, his health had deteriorated to the point where he had to spend two weeks on a breathing machine, in addition to amputating a leg due to diabetes. The surgery happened in the middle of his final film, and he finished production and recording using a prosthetic leg. Afterwards, Opsahl retired from acting.

In December 2005 Opsahl's death was prematurely announced online by the newspaper VG, an event to which the comedian reacted with humour.

Opsahl died of heart failure on 29 April 2007 at 11:30 pm local time, after being in hospital for eight weeks.
