= Kirsten Walther =

Danish actress (1933-1987)

- Born: 31 August 1933; Copenhagen, Denmark
- Died: 19 February 1987 (aged 53); Søllerød, Denmark
- Occupation: Actress
- Years active: 1956–1983

Kirsten Walther (31 August 1933 – 19 February 1987) was a Danish actress. She appeared in more than 50 films and television shows between 1956 and 1983. She is well known for her role in the films of the Olsen Gang and died unexpectedly at the age of 53 from heart failure.

== Selected filmography ==
- School for Suicide (1964)
- Paradise and Back (1964)
- Landmandsliv (1965)
- I Belong to Me (1967)
- The Olsen Gang (1968)
- The Olsen Gang in a Fix (1969)
- Ballade på Christianshavn (1971)
- The Olsen Gang's Big Score (1972)
- The Olsen Gang Goes Crazy (1973)
- The Last Exploits of the Olsen Gang (1974)
- The Olsen Gang on the Track (1975)
- Girls at Arms (1975)
- The Olsen Gang Sees Red (1976)
- Mind Your Back, Professor (1977)
- The Olsen Gang Long Gone (1981)
