= Willy Rathnov =

Danish actor (1937–1999)

- Born: 13 May 1937; Roskilde, Denmark
- Died: 29 August 1999 (aged 62); Farum, Denmark
- Occupation: Actor
- Years active: 1960-1988

Willy Rathnov (13 May 1937 – 29 August 1999) was a Danish film actor. He appeared in 32 films between 1960 and 1988. He was born in Roskilde, Denmark and died in Denmark.

== Selected filmography ==
- Onkel Joakims hemmelighed (1967)
- Soldaterkammerater på bjørnetjeneste (1968)
- Fun in the Streets (1969)
- The Egborg Girl (1969)
- Tough Guys of the Prairie (1970)
- Gold for the Tough Guys of the Prairie (1971)
- The Double Man (1976)
