= Ole Ernst =

Danish actor (1940–2013)

- Born: 16 May 1940; Vesterbro, Denmark
- Died: 1 September 2013 (aged 73); Østerbro, Denmark
- Occupation: Actor
- Years active: 1967–2013

Ole Ernst Pedersen (16 May 1940 – 1 September 2013) was a Danish actor, active on stage, TV and film. He appeared in 95 films and television shows from 1967 to 2013. He starred in the 1983 film Der er et yndigt land, which won an Honourable Mention at the 33rd Berlin International Film Festival.

Ernst died on 1 September 2013, aged 73, from undisclosed causes.

== Selected filmography ==
- The Olsen Gang on the Track (1975)
- Per (1975)
- The Olsen Gang Sees Red (1976)
- Terror (1977)
- Fængslende feriedage (1978)
- The Olsen Gang Long Gone (1981)
- Der er et yndigt land (1983)
- Epidemic (1987)
- Katinka (1988)
- Black Harvest (1993)
- Okay (2002)
- Stealing Rembrandt (2003)
- Ronal the Barbarian (2011)
