= Ove Verner Hansen =

Danish opera singer and actor (1932–2016)

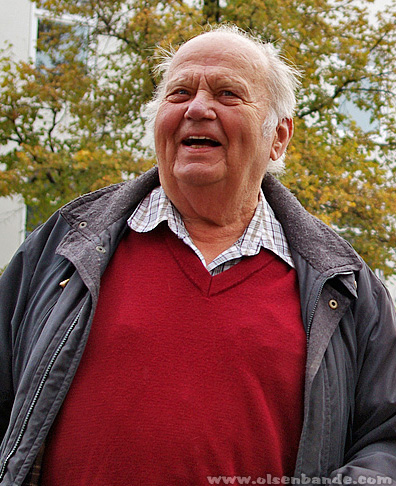
- Ove Verner Hansen (2013)
- Born: 20 July 1932; Helsingør, Denmark
- Died: 20 February 2016 (aged 83); Gentofte, Denmark

Signature
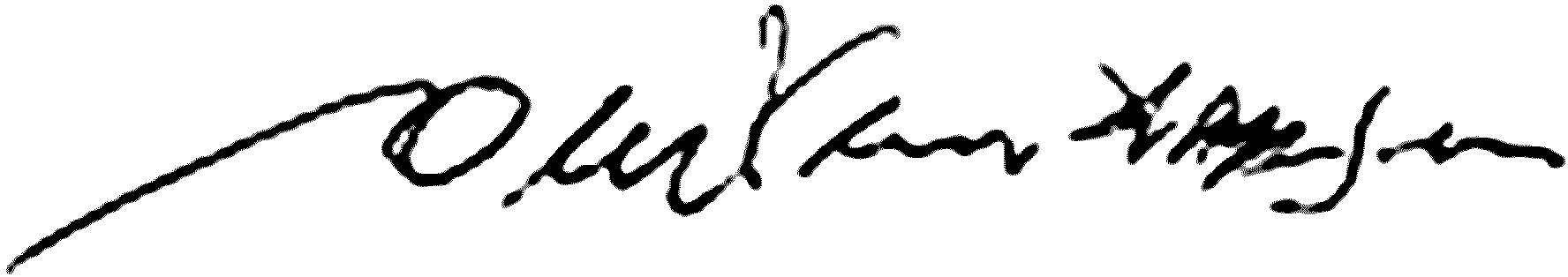

Ove Verner Hansen (20 July 1932 – 20 February 2016) was a Danish opera singer and actor. He played the character, "Bøffen" (or "Biffen" in Norwegian, literally meaning "the steak" in both languages) in 16 of the Olsen-banden-movies (11 Danish and 5 Norwegian). He played a tall, large, and slow-moving henchman, often seen lifting Egon Olsen up over his head, carrying him under one arm, and trying to kill him.

== Personal life and career ==
Hansen began his career as an office clerk, but during his early life he also worked as a sailor, miner, lumberjack, and ambulance driver. Born with a deep and voluminous voice, he later began singing professionally, and in 1958 he became accepted into the Danish National Radio Choir. Two years later, in 1960, he joined the renowned Royal Danish Opera Chorus. For several years afterwards he was considered the Royal Danish Opera's primary basso buffo.

His talent for comedy was soon discovered by movie director Erik Balling, who cast him as the bad guy "Bøffen" in nine of the iconic movies about the unlucky criminals in the Olsen Gang.

Hansen was even an accomplished cook, and the author of a number of cook books, including Mandemad (1974) (lit. Man Food) and Fiskekogebog (2001) (lit. Fish Cook Book). He even appeared occasionally as a celebrity chef on television. Hansen died on 20 February 2016 at the age of 83.
