= Erik Balling =

Danish film director

- Born: 29 November 1924; Nyborg, Denmark
- Died: 19 November 2005 (aged 80); Gentofte, Denmark
- Burial place: Gentofte Churchyard, Gentofte Municipality, Denmark
- Occupation: Film director
- Years active: 1952 – 1984

Erik Balling (29 November 1924 – 19 November 2005) was a Danish TV and film director. He created two of Denmark's most popular TV series, Matador and Huset på Christianshavn.

His feature film Qivitoq (1956) was nominated for a Golden Palm at the 1957 Cannes Film Festival, and for an Oscar as Best Foreign Language Film. His 1962 film Den kære familie was entered into the 3rd Moscow International Film Festival.

Together with special effects expert Henning Bahs, he worked on the Olsen Gang series of comedy films.

== Biography ==
Balling started working for the largest and oldest Danish film production company, Nordisk Films Kompagni, in 1946. He later became the boss of the company.

His made his directing debut with Adam & Eva (1953), which was nominated for a Bodil-award as Best Film.

In 1956 he directed Kispus, which was the first Danish movie filmed in color.

The most popular films directed by Balling were the feature film comedies about a trio of small-time crooks, the Olsen Gang. There were 13 episodes of this movie series between 1968 and 1981, starting with Olsen-banden. They were remade in several languages.

In 1998, Erik Balling received an Honorary Robert Award.

== Filmography ==
Work	Year	Credit	Notes
The Olsen Gang's Last Trick	1998	Script	Feature
Mer' Matador	1998	Himself	TV documentary
Bryggeren	1996	Story	TV series
Murder in Paradise	1988	Script	Feature
Murder in the dark	1986	Script	Feature
In the Middle of the Night	1984	Direction	Feature
Anthonsen	1984	Direction	TV series
Kurt and Valde	1983	Screenplay	Feature
The Olsen Gang Long Gone	1981	Direction	Feature
The Olsen Gang's Escape over the Fence	1981	Direction	Feature
The Olsen Gang Never Surrenders	1979	Direction	Feature
The Olsen Gang Goes to War	1978	Direction	Feature
Matador	1978	Direction	TV series
Bandefører Balling	1978	Appearance	TV documentary
The Olsen Gang Outta Sight	1977	Direction	Feature
The Moelleby Affair	1976	Script	Feature
It all adds up	1976	Script	Feature
The Olsen Gang Sees Red	1976	Direction	Feature
Superfos Glasuld – et isoleret tilfælde	1976	Direction	Commercial
The Olsen Gang on the Track	1975	Direction	Feature
The Last Exploits of the Olsen Gang	1974	Direction	Feature
The Olsen Gang Goes Crazy	1973	Direction	Feature
The Olsen Gang's Big Score	1972	Direction	Feature
Our Home is Our Castle	1971	Direction	Feature
One of those things	1971	Direction	Feature
The Olsen Gang in Jutland	1971	Direction	Feature
Viva the revolution!	1970	Direction	Feature
Huset på Christianshavn	1970	Direction	TV series
The Olsen Gang in a Fix	1969	Direction	Feature
One Saturday Evening	1968	Direction	Feature
The Olsen Gang	1968	Direction	Feature
Martha	1967	Direction	Feature
I Belong to Me	1967	Direction	Feature
Relax Freddie	1966	Direction	Feature
Strike first Freddy	1965	Direction	Feature
Halløj i himmelsengen	1965	Direction	Feature
Landmandsliv	1965	Direction	Feature
Death Comes at High Noon	1964	Direction	Feature
Sommer i Tyrol	1964	Direction	Feature
Hvis lille pige er du?	1963	Direction	Feature
Den kære familie	1962	Direction	Feature
79 of Station	1962	Direction	Feature
Cirkus Buster	1961	Direction	Feature
Poeten og Lillemor i forårshumør	1961	Direction	Feature
Forelsket i København	1960	Producer	Feature
Poeten og Lillemor og Lotte	1960	Direction	Feature
Tro, håb og trolddom	1960	Direction	Feature
Poeten og Lillemor	1959	Direction	Feature
Helle for Helene	1959	Producer	Feature
The six-day bicycle race	1958	Script	Feature
The Girls Are Willing	1958	Production manager	Feature
A woman not wanted	1957	Producer	Feature
Jeg elsker dig	1957	Producer	Feature
Kispus	1956	Direction	Feature
Qivitoq	1956	Direction	Feature
På tro og love	1955	Script	Feature
Kongeligt besøg	1954	Direction	Feature
Adam and Eve	1953	Direction	Feature
We Who Go the Kitchen Route	1953	Direction	Feature
Vi arme syndere	1952	Direction	Feature
Mød mig på Cassiopeia	1951	Production manager	Feature
Cinderella	1950	Director: Danish version	Feature
For frihed og ret	1949	Assistant director	Feature
Israel	1949	Direction	Documentary
Ditte, daughter of man	1946	Production assistant	Feature
Diskret Ophold	1946	Assistant director	Feature

== Literature ==
- Christian Monggaard, Balling – Hans liv og film, Informations Forlag, 2011. ISBN 978-87-7514-279-8.
- Karen Thisted, Erik Balling : manden med de største succeser i dansk film, Møntergården, 1996. ISBN 87-7553-555-6.
- Erik Balling – Som barn var jeg voldsomt hidsig, Aschehoug, 1998. ISBN 87-11-11180-1.
- Erik Balling – Gedächtnisbilder: Über ein Leben, die Olsenbande und all die anderen schöne Filme, Mosamax Verlag, Dresden 2016. ISBN 978-3-9817140-0-5
