= Axel Strøbye =

Danish actor (1928–2005)

- Born: 22 February 1928; Frederiksberg, Denmark
- Died: 12 July 2005 (aged 77); Charlottenlund, Denmark
- Occupation: Actor
- Years active: 1951–2000

Axel Strøby Jacobsen (22 February 1928 – 12 July 2005), known as Axel Strøbye was a Danish stage and film actor. He appeared in more than 100 films between 1951 and 2000.

He was born in the Copenhagen borough Frederiksberg and died in Charlottenlund. Strøbye was married twice, first to the actress and dancer Kirsten Jessen from 1953 to 1961, and to the actress Hanne Borchsenius from 1978 until his death. From 1962 to 1975, Strøbye cohabited with the actress Lone Hertz, with whom he had two children.

== Selected filmography ==
- This Is Life (1953)
- I kongens klæ'r (1954)
- Pigen og vandpytten (1958)
- The Poet and the Little Mother (1959)
- The Last Winter (1960)
- Han, Hun, Dirch og Dario (1962)
- Crazy Paradise (1962)
- Oskar (1962)
- Duellen (1962)
- Sekstet (1963)
- The Girl and the Press Photographer (1963)
- Bussen (1963)
- Gertrud (1964)
- School for Suicide (1964)
- It's Nifty in the Navy (1965)
- The Girl and the Millionaire (1965)
- I, a Lover (1966)
- Love Thy Neighbour (1967)
- The Veterinarian's Adopted Children (1968)
- My Sisters Children Go Astray (1971)
- 1001 Danish Delights (1972)
- Me, Too, in the Mafia (1974)
- The Olsen Gang Sees Red (1976)
- Babette's Feast (1987)
