= Egon Olsen =

- Olsen Gang character
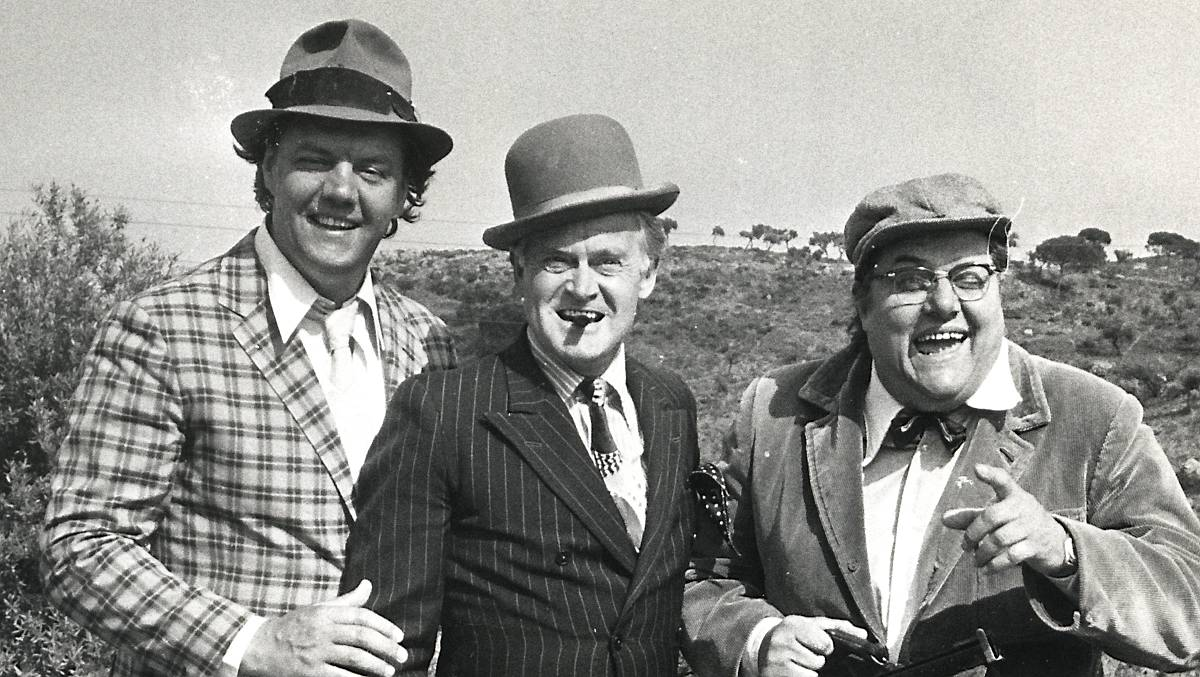
- First appearance: Olsenbanden (1968, dk); Olsenbanden Operasjon Egon (1969, no)
- Last appearance: Olsen-bandens sidste stik (1998, dk); Olsenbandens siste stikk (1999, no)
- Created by: Erik Balling
- Portrayed by: Ove Sprogøe (dk); Arve Opsahl (no)

In-universe information
- Full name: Egon Olsen
- Gender: Male
- Occupation: Criminal mastermind
- Affiliation: Olsen Gang
- Nationality: Danish

Egon Olsen (born 12 March 1925 (DK), 13 March 1923 (NO)) is a fictional character in the Danish Olsenbanden film series as well as in the Norwegian remake. He is portrayed by Ove Sprogøe in the Danish version and by Arve Opsahl in the Norwegian. In the Swedish version of the series, Jönssonligan, his part was taken by the character Charles Ingvar "Sickan" Jönsson, played by Gösta Ekman (and in the later films by other characters, played by different actors).

== Egon Olsen in the Danish series ==
In the Danish original, Egon Olsen is the small and wiry boss of the Olsen Gang. His two sidekicks are the merry Benny and the timid, pudgy Kjeld. Kjeld's wife, Yvonne, is the only one who Egon has to fight, as she tends to interfere with his plans. Egon Olsen's hallmark is his bowler hat, pinstripe suit, and an extinguished cigar end in his mouth, even when he is gagged. Egon Olsen is one of the typical antiheroes of film history, an eternal loser who wobbles but does not fall over. Some observers have pointed out that "Egon Olsen projects the image of an anarchist, an outcast from the world of established capitalism as well as from the secure world of the middle and upper classes".

Egon's involvement in each film follows a similar pattern. Egon constantly develops new and "genius" plans during his stays in prison. His catchphrase is "I have a plan", which he says to his accomplices in all fourteen films after being released from prison. The plan succeeds through the most intricate machinations (Egon's specialty is the cracking of safes with merely a stethoscope and fine feeling) but Egon always loses his object of desire due to some freak accident at the end of the movie, usually caused by the incompetence of his accomplices. Almost every film, except the fifth, the sixth and the fourteenth, ends with Egon's arrest.

=== Reception and influence ===
The role of Egon Olsen was Ove Sprogøe's most successful and also last film role. Sprogøe was honoured with a Bodil in 1975 for Olsen-Bandens sidste bedrifter. The role had a legendary renown in former East Germany, and while many West Germans are unable to associate the name of the franchise with the Danish films, nearly all Eastern Germans can at least cite Benny's catchphrase "mächtig gewaltig, Egon" (Danish "skidegodt, Egon!" - in English literally "shit-good, Egon", or "bloody good, Egon!"). Critics hypothesise that Egon's talent for improvisation impressed East Germans living under a socialist economy of scarcity, more than James Bond did, fighting his enemies with the newest technological gimmicks.

The gaolers of the Vridsløselille prison in Copenhagen, where Egon Olsen went at the end of each film, initiated a renaming of the street right in front of the prison into "Egon Olsens Vej" (55°39′40″N 12°20′53″E) in 2004. According to gaolers and the prison warden, "Egon Olsen has always been a very nice criminal who deserves to be honoured", and "Egon has done much for the facility. Up until today, many tourists from Eastern Germany go on a pilgrimage to the prison gate to take pictures".

== In the Norwegian series ==
In the Norwegian series, Egon is quite similar to his Danish counterpart, with the same costumes and mannerisms. He is shown to be quite smart, laying ingenious plans to achieve fortune, and have them ruined by either his companions, poor timing or bad luck, very much like the Danish version where Yvonne is often the cause of his downfall.

In the Norwegian series, Egon was originally set to be portrayed by Carsten Byhring, with Arve Opsahl in the role as Kjell Jensen, his companion. During rehearsal, however, Opsahl disagreed with the casting, and suggested that he and Byhring switch roles, to which Byhring and the directors fully agreed. Opsahl brought a lot of his comic talents to the role, in particular his doubletakes and long (and at the time profane) rants and outbursts, which Opsahl was known for on stage. He played the role in all fourteen films, including the final film in which he did half his scenes with a prosthetic foot, after having it amputated due to diabetes half-way through production.
