= Ove Sprogøe =

Danish actor (1919–2004)

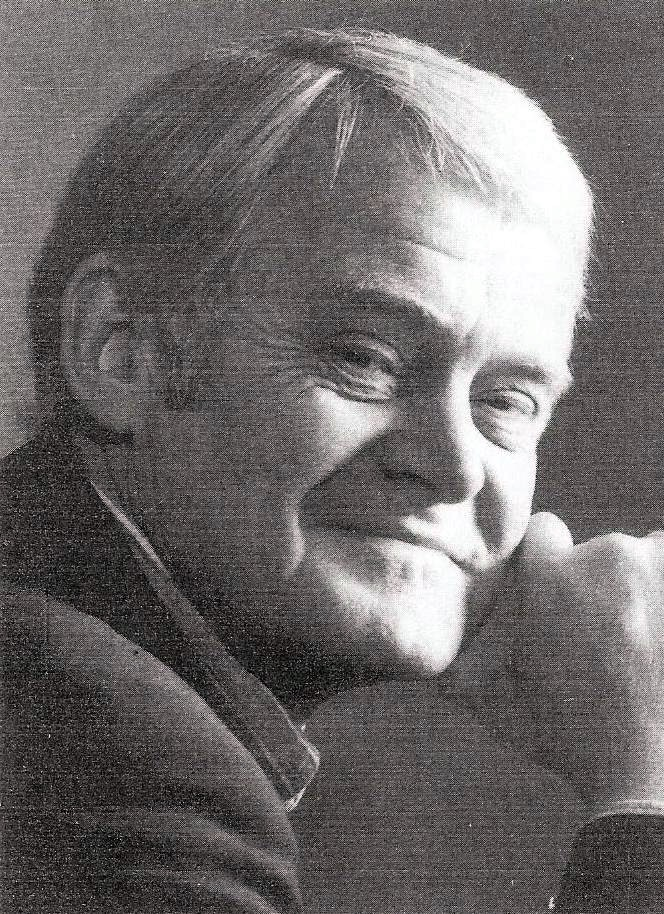
- Ove Sprogøe in 1988.
- Born: 21 December 1919; Odense, Denmark
- Died: 14 September 2004 (aged 84); Tårnby, Denmark
- Occupation: Actor
- Years active: 1946–1998

Ove Wendelboe Sprogøe Petersen (21 December 1919 – 14 September 2004) was a Danish actor and voice actor. He is probably best known for his role as gang leader Egon Olsen in the Olsen-banden films.

== Life ==
Ove Wendelboe Sprogøe Petersen was born on 21 December 1919 in Odense, Denmark, His parents were Arthur and Inger Sprogøe Petersen. He married Eva Rasmussen in 1945, with whom he had three children. One of these is actor Henning Sprogøe.

== Career ==
Sprogøe made his film debut in Hans Store Aften (His Big Night). His characteristically prominent chin that had been feared to be an obstacle of his career did not prevent him from being one of the most versatile and widely used Danish actors. His strength laid in the almost diabolic, mischievous and brash but he effortlessly played meek and shy types as well as elegantiers. Among his many roles on stage in classic plays might be mentioned Mephisto in Faust, the title figure of Strindberg's The Father and some Molière and Bertolt Brecht characters. An extremely popular actor in Denmark, he played many diverse roles, including several recurring television parts. He appeared in 157 films, making him one of the hardest-working actors in the history of Danish film. In his younger years he was often part of a duo with his friend and colleague Dirch Passer.

He is probably best known for playing one of the lead roles in the Olsen-banden movies, along with Morten Grunwald and Poul Bundgaard, playing the gang leader Egon Olsen, known for his short temper, striped suit, and cigar. By this role he earned international fame though mostly in Eastern Europe, in the GDR and Poland he together with his colleagues became almost a cult figure.

His TV roles include ex-burglar Larsen in the series Huset på Christianshavn ("The House at Christianshavn" – the first Danish sitcom) and his role as doctor Louis Hansen in the historical drama-series Matador, both also shown outside Denmark.

Sprogøe was an able singer, especially in shows or revues and his interpretation of Tim Spencer's Cigarettes, whiskey and wild wild women (in Danish re-creation: Fandens Oldemor – "The Devil's Great-Grandmother") almost became his signature tune.

He was the Danish voice of the Sultan in the dub of Disney's Aladdin, having previously voiced Jiminy Cricket, both in the Danish dub of Disney's Pinocchio and in the nationally annually broadcast television special From All of Us to All of You.

He was an actor who combined great public sympathy with the ability to remain a private person with a modest lifestyle. After his death it was revealed that he had been a passionate art enthusiast and had amassed a valuable collection of modern paintings.

== Death and legacy ==
Sprogøe died on 14 September 2004. He passed away only 25 days after his wife, who died on 20 August 2004.

The Ove Sprogøe Award was established by Nordisk Film after his death. The inaugural award went to Niels Ellegaard.

The state-owned road to The State Prison in Vridsløselille (the prison where his Egon Olsen character was a frequent "guest"), was renamed by the municipality of Albertslund to Egon Olsens Vej (Egon Olsen Road). On 24 October 2005, his native city of Odense named a square Ove Sprogøes Plads (Ove Sprogøe Square) in his honour.

== Filmography (selected) ==
=== Film ===
- The Swedenhielm Family (1947)
- We Who Go the Kitchen Route (1953)
- The Crime of Tove Andersen (1953)
- Journey to the Seventh Planet (1962)
- Strike First Freddy (1965)
- Relax Freddie (1966)
- The Olsen Gang (1968)
- The Olsen Gang in a Fix (1969)
- The Olsen Gang in Jutland (1971)
- The Last Exploits of the Olsen Gang (1974)
- The Olsen Gang Sees Red (1976)
- The Olsen Gang's Last Trick (1998)

=== Television ===
- Matador (1978–1982)
- Huset på Christianshavn
