= Aage Lundvald =

Danish illustrator, cartoonist, and composer (1908–1983)

- Born: Aage Martin Lundvald; 11 July 1908 Copenhagen, Denmark
- Died: 15 April 1983 (aged 74)
- Areas: Illustrator, cartoonist, composer

Aage Martin Lundvald (11 July 1908 – 15 April 1983) was a Danish illustrator, cartoonist, and composer. With a production of more than 1000 posters, he was one of the most productive Danish artists in his field.

Lundvald was the son of machinist Aage Fritz Lundvald and his wife Johanne Margrethe Frederiksen. After high school Lundvald considered studying law, but soon revealed a talent for drawing. In 1927 he made his first professional drawing, a cover for Edition Wilhelm Hansen, and soon began making a living from cartoons, women's magazine illustrations, and vignettes for the daily Politiken. Lundvald made his first movie poster in 1937 for the film Life on the Hegn Farm, and created hundreds of movie posters and programs for both Danish and foreign films. In addition, he made countless book covers and funny cartoons, and wrote songs to Marguerite Viby among others.
