= Henning Bahs =

Danish screenwriter

- Born: 12 March 1928; Copenhagen, Denmark
- Died: 29 March 2002 (aged 74); Herlev, Denmark
- Occupation: Screenwriter
- Years active: 1960–2002

Henning Bahs (12 March 1928 – 29 March 2002) was a Danish screenwriter and special effects designer. He wrote for more than 40 films between 1960 and 2002. He is best known as the co-author (with Erik Balling) of the Olsen-banden series of films. The Henning Bahs Award was established in 2012 by the Danish Film Critics Association in commemoration of Bahs' death ten years earlier.

== Selected filmography ==
- Forelsket i København (1960)
- A Farmer's Life (1965)
- Relax Freddie (1966)
- The Olsen Gang (1968)
- The Olsen Gang Sees Red (1976)
- Jeppe på bjerget (1981)
- Varning för Jönssonligan (1981)
- Jönssonligan och Dynamit-Harry (1982)
- Jönssonligan får guldfeber (1984)
