= Bo Christensen =

Danish film producer (1937–2020)

- Born: 24 August 1937; Frederiksberg, Denmark
- Died: 11 April 2020 (aged 82)
- Occupation: Film producer
- Spouse: Kirsten Hansen-Møller

Bo Christensen (24 August 1937 – 11 April 2020) was a Danish film producer.

Christensen is best known for producing Babette's Feast (1987), for which he won the Best Foreign Film Oscar and the BAFTA Best Foreign Film award in 1988.

He acted in five films, and produced or co-produced some 60 movies over the years and continued to be busy as a producer. He has produced most of the Olsen-banden movies and is the producer of Denmark's most successful TV series Matador (1978–1982).

== Selected filmography ==
- 2003 - Regel nr. 1
- 1999 - Den eneste ene
- 1992 - Sofie
- 1991 - Europa
- 1989 - Miraklet i Valby
- 1988 - Katinka
- 1987 - Babette’s Feast
- 1976 - The Olsen Gang Sees Red
- 1969 - We Are All Demons
- 1967 - Story of Barbara
- 1966 - Relax Freddie
- 1966 - Gift
- 1964 - Døden kommer til middag
- 1964 - Summer in Tyrol
