= Morten Grunwald =

Danish actor

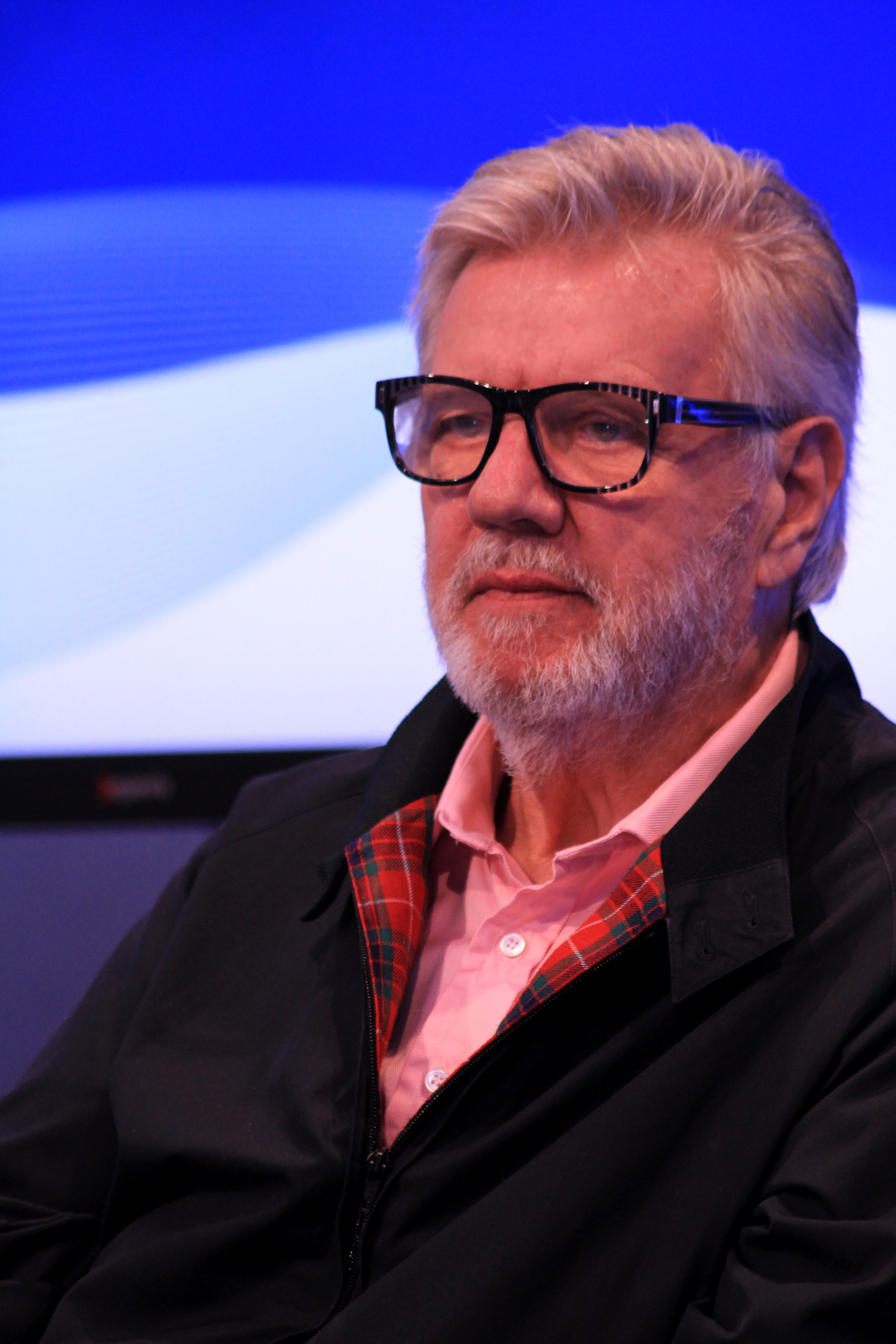
- Grunwald in 2012
- Born: 9 December 1934; Odense, Denmark
- Died: 14 November 2018 (aged 83); Hellerup, Denmark
- Occupation(s): Actor, theatre manager
- Years active: 1961–2017
- Spouse: Lily Weiding (m. 1961)
- Children: 1

Walter Morten Grunwald (9 December 1934 – 14 November 2018) was a Danish actor, stage director and theatre manager.

== Early life and education ==
He was born in Odense, Denmark, attended Odense Theatrical School in 1958, and graduated from the Royal Danish Theatre's Theatrical School in 1962. Beginning in 1971, he was the manager of several theatres in Copenhagen.

== Career ==
Grunwald made his debut in En blandt mange ("One among many") in 1961.

He played one of the lead roles in the popular series of Olsen Gang movies, starring as Benny Frandsen, alongside Ove Sprogøe's Egon Olsen and Poul Bundgaard's Kjeld Jensen.

Grunwald founded and led Bristol Teatret in Copenhagen from 1971 to 1980. In 1979, Grunwald succeeded Bent Meiding as manager of the Betty Nansen Theatre, a post he held until 1992. From 1977, together with Peder Sadolin, his partner from Bristol Teatret, he was also a driving force behind the establishment of Østre Gasværk Teater in an abandoned gasometer.

Grunwald retired on 11 June 2017, stating his body was too old.

== Death ==
On 16 October 2018, the 83-year-old Grunwald informed Danish media that he had developed thyroid cancer, and that he only had months left to live. Shortly before, he had cancelled an appearance at an event celebrating the 50th anniversary of the first Olsen Gang film, citing illness. He died a month later on 14 November 2018 in Hellerup, Denmark, aged 83.
