= Poul Bundgaard =

Danish actor and singer (1922–1998)

Poul Arne Bundgaard
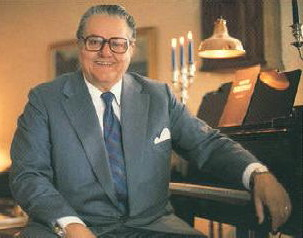
- Poul Bundgaard 1991
- Born: 27 October 1922; Hellerup, Denmark
- Died: 3 June 1998 (aged 75); Gentofte, Denmark

Poul Arne Bundgaard (27 October 1922 – 3 June 1998) was a Danish actor and singer. He is probably best known for his role as the henpecked Kjeld in the Olsen-banden films.

He also appeared in the 1966 spy film Strike First Freddy as the villain, and as the elf Gammel Nok in The Julekalender.

== Biography ==
In addition to having appeared in a large number of Danish films, Bundgaard starred in a number of operettas in the late 1940s until the 1950s, and worked at the Royal Danish Theatre as a singer between 1958 and 1973; however, he focused mostly on acting later on in his career, partly due to stage fright.

He died during the filming of Olsen-bandens sidste stik and Tommy Kenter was used as stand-in for some of the scenes while Kurt Ravn did his voice.
