= Malayalam softcore pornography =

Genre of softcore pornographic films produced in Kerala, India

- Years active: c. 1985 – c. 2005
- Location: India
- Major figures: Abhilasha; Silk Smitha; Shakeela; Reshma; P. Chandrakumar
- Influences: Adipapam; Kinnara Thumbikal

Malayalam softcore pornography was a popular genre of softcore pornography produced in the Indian state of Kerala in the Malayalam language. Popularly known as Mallu porn films or B-grade films, they are mostly recognised as low-quality films with fairly low budgets. They emerged alongside mainstream Malayalam cinema of Kerala in the 1980s.

Adipapam (1988) is regarded as the first successful Malayalam film with softcore nudity, and it is considered to have started the trend of softcore films in Malayalam. Despite facing a temporary decline in the 1990s, the genre's popularity grew after the successful release of Kinnara Thumbikal (2000), which starred Shakeela. This period was termed the Shakeela tharangam (Shakeela wave). There is a general consensus that the films, which critics called vulgar and crude, were the backbone of the Malayalam film industry during its worst period. In 2001, around 64% of the total films produced in Malayalam were of the softporn variety. In conjunction with the rise of the internet in India, the genre began to decline.

To evade the Central Board of Film Certification, certain scenes were shot separately and not shown to the board. Many theatre owners and distributors illegally inserted nudity from foreign films or hardcore pornography into the films.

== Characteristics ==
Although Malayalam softcore pornographic films had sexually suggestive plots, film historians do not consider them overtly explicit or simply pornographic.

=== Portrayal of women ===
In mainstream Indian movies, the hero (male lead) is normally central to the plot. Malayalam softcore pornographic films presented their heroines at the center. Female leads often portrayed unfaithful wives, women with a busy sex life, or "everyday" women. In Malayalam B-grade films, male roles were functionally supplementary, with the heroine and her sexuality emphasised. Women in the films are stereotypically at least 25 years old and in desperate need of sexual intimacy. Heroines are often dressed in scanty clothes that exposed midriffs and cleavage.

=== Performers ===
Several actresses launched their career through the Malayalam softcore pornographic films, including Abhilasha, who is considered one of the forerunners of this genre. Silk Smitha, who had gained success with dance numbers in the early 1980s, also became an integral part of the industry. Many actresses and actors who gained success in other genres also acted in several B-grade films that were not explicit compared to the normal softcore genre. These actors became well known within the genre, and included Prameela, Unni Mary, Disco Shanti, Anuradha, Madhuri, Jyothilakshmi, Kuyili, T. G. Ravi and Ratheesh.

Shakeela, who was prolific in the early 2000s, is commonly considered the quintessential star of the softcore genre. Reshma and Maria were also prominent. Maria transitioned to the genre after acting in mainstream Malayalam films such as Nirnayam, Pallavoor Devanarayanan, Megham and Chandranudikkunna Dikkil. In the early 2000s, the genre also featured actresses such as Sindhu, Rajini, Devika, Roshni, Sharmili and Alphonsa.

== History ==
=== Roots and early years ===
In the 1970s, Malayalam films that explore themes surrounding sexuality started emerging. The 1972 Malayalam film Punarjanmam is considered to be the first erotic psychic thriller in Indian film history. The film involves a man who is unable to have sex with his wife because she appears to him as his mother each time they attempt to consummate their relationship. In 1978, Avalude Ravukal was released, directed by I. V. Sasi, is about an adolescent sex worker. It was the first Malayalam film to get an A certification, classifying it as fit for adults only. It was highly successful and was dubbed in Tamil and Hindi. Though currently regarded as a cult movie with a strong social message, the film was considered and marketed as pornographic, especially to non-malayali audience, when it was released. Also in 1978, Rathinirvedham was released. The film is about a teenage boy who is sexually attracted to an older woman. It was directed by Bharathan, the movie is considered a landmark film in Malayalam cinematic history. Some film analysts said that the influx of Malayalam softcore porn films during the next several years began after the release of Rathinirvedham.

=== Rise and peak ===
From the mid-1980s, production of softcore porn gradually increased. An increase in VCRs and TVs contributed to the growth of the genre. In 1985, director Crossbelt Mani made the film Ottayan. The film, which featured a rape and revenge storyline, was distributed in Kerala's main theatres. In Ottayan, the heroine's blouse is pulled off during a six-minute rape scene and the villain massages her breasts. The film, which cost ₹1 million to make, made ₹1.2 million in two weeks until the censor board banned it. Dhoomam (1985) director Chandrasekharan Thampi originally planned to make the film a black-and-white art film, but it was shelved due to financial difficulties. Later, he inserted additional sex scenes and released the movie through his own firm, distributing it only in isolated towns and villages; the film became popular due to word-of-mouth promotion. K. S. Gopalakrishnan then made the 1986 films Pidikitapulli and Karinagam, which featured several sex scenes and nudity that were not shown to the censor board. The sex scenes were absent when the censor board confiscated a print of Pidikitapulli, but present when it played in a suburban Trivandrum theatre two weeks later. At that time, K. V. Gangadharan, president of the Kerala film chamber and producer of the mainstream Malayalam film Vartha (1986), said that "super-hit family dramas in the cities are flopping in rural areas because the average male cine-goer in these areas is lured by these soft-porn films with inserted sex scenes." Following the ban, producers and distributors of soft porn films relocated from cities to the countryside. Students from Trivandrum made daily visits to Guruvayoor or Attingal to see soft-porn films. In 1986, roughly 14 of about 32 films released had sex or nude scenes that were shot separately and were inserted into the film for screening in rural areas only after the rest of it had been shown to the censor board. These reels were known as Thund (Bits) and popularising the term Bit/Piece padam (Bit film).

In 1988, Adipapam was released. It is regarded as the first successful Malayalam film with softcore nudity. It was a big success at the box office, grossing ₹25 million against a budget of ₹750,000. The film's director, Chandrakumar, went on to direct eight more softcore films. The leading actress, Abhilasha, became the most sought-after B-grade actress of that time. The success of Adipapam inspired a series of similar productions in the next few years. The 1989 film Layanam, starring Silk Smitha in the lead role, was also a big success at box office. Twelve years after its release, it was remade in Hindi as Reshma Ki Jawani. Film historian Rajakrishnan said, "The boom of softcore pornographic films was fuelled by a lenient Madras Censor Board. When they were barred from censoring Malayalam films, they dried up".

=== Temporary decline in the 1990s ===
Most of the softcore films that released after Layanam had a similar storyline with many of them having a weak screenplay. When family-friendly and comedy films became more popular in the Malayalam cinema industry, there was a temporary decline in the softcore industry. This caused a reduction in the rate of production of softcore films. Only a few of them were successful at the box office.

=== The Shakeela wave ===
With the continued failure of comedy films and early-2000s theater strikes in Kerala, there was a comeback of B-grade films in Malayalam. By 2000, a majority of the Malayalam films were of soft porn genre. In March 2000, Kinnarathumbikal, a low budget softcore pornographic film starring Shakeela, was released. It was a major commercial success, grossing ₹40 million at the box office against a budget of ₹1.2 million. The film was dubbed in more than six languages. The success of Kinnarathumbikal triggered a series of similar low-budget softcore pornographic films produced in Malayalam. There was also an increase in Malayalam softcore pornographic films starring Shakeela, leading to the Shakeela wave (Shakeela tharangam). Around 57 of the total 89 films released in 2001 belonged to the soft-porn category and Shakeela featured in many of them.

During the Shakeela wave, many of her old films were re-released, including Telugu and Tamil films. At one time, posters with Shakeela's half-naked body, a single name and a large "adults only" emblem were widespread in Kerala. According to film scholar Darshana Sreedhar Mini, during the Malayalam film industry crisis of the early 2000s, the success of Shakeela films became critical to the industry's survival because her presence insured revenues and, hence, the survival of film employees. Shakeela became well known throughout the country as the pan-Indian face of soft-porn. Many of her films were well-known outside of Kerala and were dubbed into other languages. With lower production costs and poorer quality than mainstream films, Malayalam B-grade films dominated a significant portion of the market, with considerable production. Many theatres, which faced shutdown, survived only because of the arrival and acceptance of such B-grade films and the market was flooded with many B-grade films.

Actresses such as Reshma, Maria, Sindhu and Alphonsa, who arose with or after Shakeela, became an integral part of the industry. Shakeela's 2001 film Rakshasarajni was considered successful, especially as it competed against Raavanaprabhu and Rakshasa Rajavu, which were larger films.

=== Decline and end ===
The rise of the internet negatively affected the Malayalam softcore porn industry, as freely-available online images and videos became more popular than video cassettes. The directors of Malayam softcore pornographic films did not try to bring new actresses into the field, and the production of such films slowly stopped. The state censor board also took measures to "curb the spread" of erotic films. Between 2005 and 2007, the release of B-grade was limited. Some producers attempted to revive the genre between 2007 and 2010, but their films did not perform well.

=== Aftermath ===
While the Malayalam film industry no longer produces softcore pornographic films, video clips and images from the older films are still major earners for porn websites in India. Mallu aunty is a term commonly used on porn websites. The Malayalam heroine has been referenced in popular erotic comics that portray married female characters as the targets of sexual fantasies, such as Savita Bhabhi and Velamma. In August 2022, Yessma, an OTT streaming platform for adult content, was launched.

== See also ==
- Pornography in India
- Sex in Indian entertainment
- Sexuality in India
- Nudity in film
- Nudity in India
- Sex in film
