= K. Rajagopal (film editor) =

Indian film editor

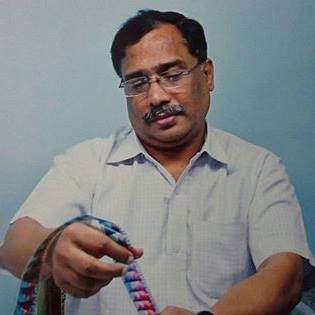
- Rajagopal holding a 35mm film reel
- Born: 24 July 1952 (age 73); Panangattiri, Kerala, India
- Occupation: Film editor
- Years active: 1976–present
- Spouse: Linda Janet

K. Rajagopal is an Indian film editor who has worked predominantly in Malayalam cinema. He has achieved P. A. Backer Award for the editing of Celluloid in 2012, Kerala State Film Award for the editing of Oru Indian Pranayakadha in 2013 and Film Producers Association Award for the editing of Celluloid in 2012.

== Personal life ==
Rajagopal was born to Mathakkode Veettil Krishnan Kutty and Kunnampalli Veettil Padmavathy at Panangattiri. He is married to Linda Janet. He completed his primary education at Panangattiri UP School and Kollengode Raja's High School.

== Filmography ==
Since 1971, he started his career with G. Venkittaraman, senior Malayalam film editor and worked as his assistant in more than 200 Malayalam films. Theere Pratheekshikkathe was his first independent work in 1984.

=== As Assistant Editor ===
Worked under G. Venkitaraman

- Vilkkanundu Swapnangal (1980)
- Aarathi (1981)
- Kurukkante Kalyanam (1982)
- Appunni (1984)

=== Partial filmography ===
- Adhyayam Onnu Muthal (1985)
- Sanmanassullavarkku Samadhanam (1986)
- Revathikkoru Pavakkutty (1986)
- Manja Manthrangal (1987)
- P.C. 369 (1987)
- Pattanapravesham (1988)
- Unnikrishnante Adyathe Christmas (1988)
- Kudumbapuranam (1988)
- Varavelpu (1989)
- Artham (1989)
- Khuli Khidki (1989)
- Peruvannapurathe Visheshangal (1989)
- Mazhavilkavadi (1989)
- Kanana Sundari (1989)

== Awards ==
- P. A. Backer
- Kerala State Film Awards
- 2014-Film Producers Association Award.
