= Sneha (disambiguation) =

Sneha is an Indian given name.

Sneha may also refer to:

- Sneha (actress), Indian actress
- Sneha (film), a 1999 Indian Kannada language film
- Sneha, a 2001 Indian Tamil-language film, starring Shakeela and Reshma
- Sneha College of Architecture, Kerala, India
- Sneha (TV series), an Indian Telugu-language television series

== See also ==
- Sneham (disambiguation)
- Snehan, Indian poet and lyricist in Tamil
- Neha, an Indian feminine given name, related to Sneha
