= Abhilasha =

Abhilasha may refer to:

== TV and film ==
- Abhilasha (TV series), an Indian Telugu-language soap opera, on air 2019–2020
- Abhilasha (1968 film), an Indian Hindi-language romance
- Abhilasha (1983 film), an Indian Telugu-language thriller

== People ==
- Abhilasha (actress), in Hindi and Malayalam-language films such as Kanana Sundari
- Abhilasha Gupta, Indian politician
- Abhilasha Kumari (born 1956), Indian jurist
- Abhilasha Mhatre (born 1987), Indian kabaddi player
- Abhilash Thapliyal, Indian presenter and actor
