= Pornography in India =

Pornography in India is illegal in all forms which include the print media, electronic media, and digital media (OTT). Hosting, displaying, uploading, modifying, publishing, transmitting, storing, updating or sharing pornography is illegal in India. India's Supreme Court has said that "OTT regulation is a necessity as some OTT's [such as] ALTT and Ullu show nudity, obscenity and even porn, because of the absence of any proper rules and regulation."

On 22 August 2023, the Government of India assured that it would bring rules and regulation to check vulgar and obscene content on social media and OTT platforms. On 14 March 2024, the Ministry of Information and Broadcasting banned eighteen OTT apps from the Google Play store and suspended all 57 of their social media accounts, as well as closed 19 streaming websites. The banned platforms are MoodX, Prime Play, Hunters, Besharams, Rabbit movies, Voovi, Fugi, Mojflix, Chikooflix, Nuefliks, Xtramood, NeonX VIP, X Prime, Tri Flicks, Uncut Adda, Dreams Films, Hot Shots VIP, and Yessma. On 25 July 2025, the Ministry of Information and Broadcasting banned 25 OTT apps from the Google Play store and suspended all 40 of their social media accounts, as well as closed 26 streaming websites. The banned platforms include ALTT, Ullu, Big Shots App, Desiflix, Boomex, NeonX VIP, Navarasa Lite, Gulab App, Kangan App, Bull App, ShowHit, Jalva App, Wow Entertainment, Look Entertainment, Hitprime, Fugi, Feneo, ShowX, Sol Talkies, Adda TV, HotX VIP, Hulchul App, MoodX, Triflicks, and Mojflix. On 24 February 2026, the Ministry of Information and Broadcasting banned from 5 OTT apps from Google play store and suspended all of their 5 social media accounts, as well as 5 closed streaming websites. The banned platforms were include Feel App, Digi Movieplex, Jugnu App, MoodX VIP, and Koyal Playpro.

== Legal framework and regulation ==
In India, the legal status of pornography distinguishes between private adult consumption and commercial production, public distribution, and digital transmission. Federal statutes prohibit the commercial distribution of sexually explicit media, but court rulings have continuously safeguarded the private consumption of adult content in the home. However, both protectionist and criminal laws strictly prohibit the use of child sexual abuse material.

=== Constitutional and penal foundations ===
Article 19(2) of the Constitution of India, which permits the state to impose reasonable restrictions on the freedom of speech and expression in the interests of "public order, decency or morality," is the foundation for the legal restriction of explicit material.

Section 294 of the Bharatiya Nyaya Sanhita (BNS), which replaced Section 292 of the Indian Penal Code (IPC) of the colonial era, is the main legal framework governing physical media. According to this section, an object is legally considered "obscene" if it is lascivious or appeals to the prurient interest, or if its overall effect tends to corrupt and deprave those exposed to it. This includes the display of any content in electronic form. The commercial sale, distribution, hiring, import, export, and public display of pornographic materials are all prohibited by Section 294(2). The maximum penalty for a first conviction is two years in prison and an increased fine of up to ₹5,000; for subsequent convictions, the maximum penalty is five years in prison and a fine of up to ₹10,000.

=== E-commerce and digital regulations ===
The Information Technology Act, 2000, 2000 became the primary regulatory focus as electronic networks grew. Two separate provisions of the act specifically address online adult media.:

- Section 67: Prohibits the publication or transmission of pornographic content via electronic means. A first conviction can result in a fine of up to ₹5 lakh and a maximum sentence of three years in prison.
- Section 67A: Imposes severe penalties on content that contains "sexually explicit acts or conduct." For a first offense, a mandatory prison sentence of up to five years and a fine of up to ₹10 lakh are imposed.

=== Private consumption and judicial precedents ===
The legal distinction between private personal consumption and public commercialization is upheld by Indian jurisprudence. The Supreme Court of India examined whether private viewing of explicit content could be prohibited in a number of petitions, including the ongoing "Kamlesh Vaswani v. Union of India" case. The IPC and the IT Act do not make it illegal for consenting adults to watch adult porn in private at home, according to the judicial consensus.

=== Website blocking and intermediary liability ===
The Ministry of Electronics and Information Technology uses its statutory authority under Section 69A of the IT Act to issue website blocking orders in order to restrict public access without criminalizing consumers. The government regularly directs internet service providers to restrict public access to thousands of URLs hosted outside of India in accordance with these directives.

The Information Technology (Intermediary Guidelines and Digital Media Ethics Code) Rules further regulate online platforms and host providers. Tech intermediaries must exercise due diligence in order to maintain their legal "safe harbor" protection under Section 79 of the IT Act. Intermediaries are required to remove or disable access to non-consensual sexually explicit content or obscenity within 24 hours of receiving actual knowledge or a court order.

=== Complete ban on child sexual abuse content ===
Child sexual abuse material is strictly forbidden in all forms of production, distribution, and possession, unlike to adult pornography. The IT Act's Section 67B makes it illegal to publish, transmit, download, or search for child pornography electronically.

Additionally, anyone who stores or possesses child pornographic material in any form faces harsh penalties under Section 15 of the Protection of Children from Sexual Offences (POCSO) Act, 2012 (POCSO) Act, 2012, making it a crime even if it is not meant for commercial distribution or circulation.

== Types of publication ==
=== Print ===
Studies have found that print media is less widely accessible than internet media in India. A randomized survey of 96 random vendors, such as video stores, mobile downloads/recharge stores and cybercafés, in Haryana found that 17% displayed pornography openly, 34% displayed it semi-openly, and 49% kept it hidden. It is possible that cultural taboos and legal issues (such as those described below) make it more desirable to view pornography in India through Internet media, such as computers or smartphones, for more privacy.

=== Internet ===
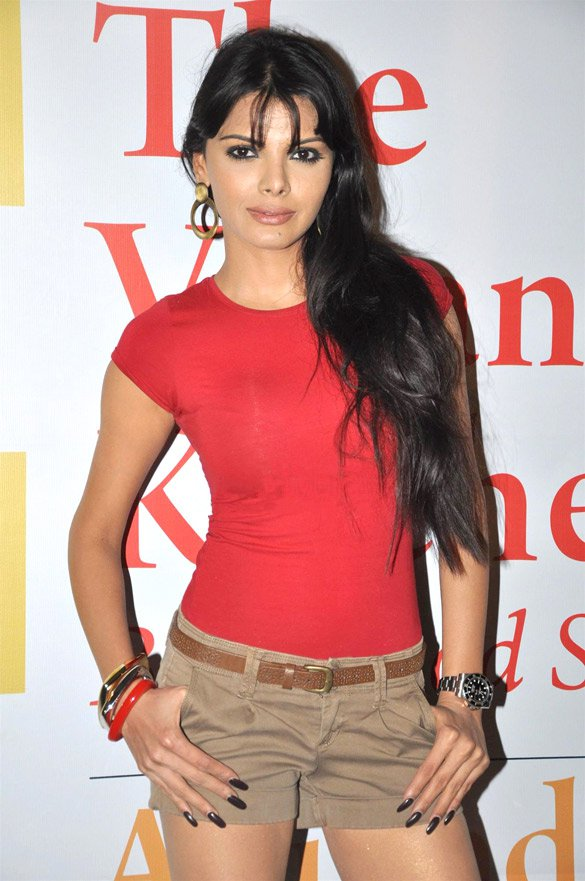
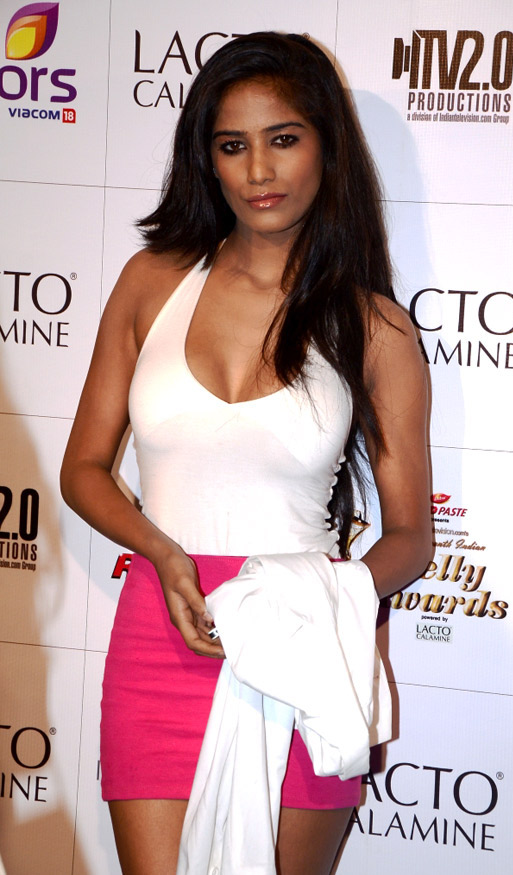
Sherlyn Chopra (left) was and Poonam Pandey (right) is very active on the adult platform OnlyFans

Internet pornography has become very popular in India with from 30% up to 70% of total traffic from porn websites. It has become a major portion of traffic and source of data revenue for telecom companies. A popular porn site released viewership data and national capital Delhi recorded up to 40% of all traffic.

One survey found that 63% of youths in urban areas such as Haryana reported watching pornography, with 74% accessing it through their mobile phones. As smartphone and internet access in India continues to increase, more people will be able to privately view pornography. Quartz found that 50% of Indian IP addresses accessed popular pornography websites on mobile phones. Online erotic comics have also become popular in India as the internet becomes more accessible to the common citizen.

== Judicial opinion ==
In July 2015, the Supreme Court of India refused to allow the blocking of pornographic websites and said that watching pornography indoors in the privacy of one's own home was not a crime. Later in 2015, the DOT banned 857 pornographic websites, lifted the ban again, and then asked Internet service providers to ban only such websites where there is child pornography.

The Supreme Court of India, in Khoday Distilleries Ltd. and Ors. v. State of Karnataka and Ors. – (1995) 1 SCC 574, held that there is no fundamental right to carry on the business of exhibiting and publishing pornographic or obscene films and literature.

Kamlesh Vaswani vs. Union of India and Ors in 2013 (diary 5917, 2013), a public interest litigation (PIL) petition was filed in the Supreme Court seeking a ban on pornography in India. The Court issued a notice to the central government and sought its response. The government informed the Court that the Cyber Regulation Advisory Committee constituted under Section 88 of the IT Act, 2000 was assigned with a brief with regard to availability of pornography on the Internet and it was looking into the matter.

On 26 January 2016, the Supreme Court in written order, instructed the government "to suggest the ways and means so that these activities are curbed. The innocent children cannot be made prey to these kind of painful situations, and a nation, by no means, can afford to carry any kind of experiment with its children in the name of liberty and freedom of expression. When we say nation, we mean each member of the collective".

The Supreme Court has said that it can't stop an adult from viewing pornography or sexually explicit material in private spaces, citing Article 21 (the right to personal liberty) of the Indian constitution.

On 18 February 2015, the organization Prajwala submitted Videos of Sexual Violence and Recommendations, a suo moto PIL filed in the Supreme Court (Diary No. 6818, 2015). Prajwala pleaded with the court to stop the rampant circulation of rape videos through the mobile application WhatsApp. The Supreme Court has ordered a CBI probe to find and arrest the culprits clearly visible in the videos.

== Socio-cultural attitudes ==
Many sex-related topics, such as pornography, are considered taboo in traditional Indian households. This seems to be rapidly changing, especially in urbanized cities. Researchers have found that the primary sex education of low-income college youth born in the late 1970s to early 1980s in India comes from pornography and conversations amongst their peers, based on focus group discussions, interviews, and surveys. However, due to the internet and increased access for the common citizen, pornography has slowly entered the public discourse, most notably with the outrage towards a 2015 government order to censor 857 websites that contained explicit materials.

In 2011, Sunny Leone's participation in one of India's most popular reality shows, Bigg Boss, initiated debate about the place of pornography in the country. The ratings and tolerance for her appearance was noted in contrast with India's cultural attitudes on sex. Leone was recruited by director Mahesh Bhatt at the Bigg Boss house for her first Bollywood film, Jism 2.

== Homosexual pornography ==
Homosexual pornography is not widely available in print, due to the socio-culture taboo surrounding both pornography and homosexuality. However, Indian IP addresses access both lesbian and gay porn using the internet, with a 213% increase in searches for gay porn from 2013 to 2014. Additionally, the most popular search for pornography amongst females in India, centers on lesbian and gay pornography.

== Violence ==
Important people in media have argued that censoring pornography would decrease rapes in India. There has not been a link between pornography being a significant factor in the rate of crime and violence in India. On the contrary, in other countries, increased availability of porn has been correlated with lower rates of sexual violence.

== Sex ==
Some studies have speculated that pornography influences sex work in India. For instance, one study of 555 female sex workers found that 45% self-reported pornographic influence driving clientele desire for anal sex. In another study, female sex workers reported being asked to perform new sexual acts such as anal sex, masturbation and different sex positions, requests that they believed were due to an increased exposure to pornography.

== See also ==
- Pornography laws by region
- Legality of child pornography
- Internet censorship in India
- Sex in Indian entertainment
- Sexuality in India
- Pornography laws by region
- Pornography in Asia
- Pornography in the United States
- Ullu
- Debonair (magazine)
- Kirtu
  - Savita Bhabhi
  - Savita Bhabhi (film)

== Bibliography ==
- Ketaki Chowkhani (2016). "Pleasure, bodies and risk: women's viewership of pornography in urban India". Porn Studies. 3 (4). Routledge: 443–452. doi:10.1080/23268743.2016.1147374.
- Dixon, D.F. (2014). Pornography and its devastating consequences of the women and children in India. Dominic F Dixon. Archived from the original on 5 April 2023.
- Sharma, MK; Rao, GN; Benegal, V; Thennarasu, K; Oommen, D (2019). "Use of pornography in India: Need to explore its implications". The National Medical Journal of India. 32 (5): 282–284. doi:10.4103/0970-258X.295968. PMID 32985442.
- Dasgupta, M. (2009). Cyber Crime in India: A Comparative Study. Eastern Law House. ISBN 978-8-171-77216-2. LCCN 2009305808. Archived from the original on 4 April 2023.
- Padte, R.K. (2018). Cyber Sexy: Rethinking Pornography. Penguin Random House. ISBN 978-9-353-05038-2. Archived from the original on 4 April 2023.
- Datta, S.; Panda, R.; Das, S. (2017). "Need for Personal Space: Legalizing Pornography in India". Media Watch. 8 (3): 355–365. doi:10.15655/mw/2017/v8i3/49152.
- Vinnakota, Divya; Arafat, S. M. Yasir; Kumar Kar, Sujita; Sivasubramanian, Madhini; Razia Hossain, Sayeda; Davod Parsa, Ali; Kabir, Russell (2021). "Pornography and Sexual Violence Against Women in India: A Scoping Review". Journal of Psychosexual Health. 3 (3): 216–21. doi:10.1177/26318318211023935.
- Heath, D. (2010). Purifying Empire: Obscenity and the Politics of Moral Regulation in Britain, India and Australia. Cambridge University Press. ISBN 978-1-139-48818-1. Archived from the original on 7 April 2023.
- Anirban K. Baishya (2017). "Pornography of place: Location, leaks and obscenity in the Indian MMS porn video". South Asian Popular Culture. 15 (1). Routledge: 57–71. doi:10.1080/14746689.2017.1351089. S2CID 148632540.
- Mahapatra, B; Saggurti, N (2014). "Exposure to pornographic videos and its effect on HIV-related sexual risk behaviours among male migrant workers in southern India". PLOS ONE. 9 (11) e113599. Bibcode:2014PLoSO...9k3599M. doi:10.1371/journal.pone.0113599. PMC 4244083. PMID 25423311.
- Bradley, J.; Rajaram, S.P.; Isac, S.; et al. (2016). "Pornography, Sexual Enhancement Products, and Sexual Risk of Female Sex Workers and their Clients in Southern India". Archives of Sexual Behavior. 45 (4): 945–954. doi:10.1007/s10508-015-0486-4. PMID 25905909.
- Bhaskaran, S. (2004). Made in India: Decolonizations, Queer Sexualities, Trans/national Projects. Comparative Feminist Studies. Palgrave Macmillan US. ISBN 978-1-403-97925-4. LCCN 2004044506. Archived from the original on 7 April 2023.
- Kunjakkan, K.A. (2002). Feminism and Indian Realities. Mittal Publications. ISBN 978-8-170-99834-1. Archived from the original on 7 April 2023.
- Halder, D. and Jaishankar, K. (2016). Cyber Crimes against Women in India. SAGE Publications. ISBN 978-9-385-98576-8. Archived from the original on 4 April 2023.
- Parrinder, Geoffrey (1996). Sexual Morality in the World's Religions. Oneworld Publications, Oxford. ISBN 978-1-85168-108-2.
- Gautam, A. (2018). Pornistan: How to Survive the Porn Epidemic in India. Readomania. ISBN 978-9-385-85468-2. LCCN 2018330828. Archived from the original on 7 April 2023.
- Wadkar, A. (2021). Psycho-social Health Issues in Indian Youth: Emerging Trends and Intervention. SAGE Publications. ISBN 978-9-354-79113-0. LCCN 2021042987. Archived from the original on 7 April 2023.
- Math, SB; Viswanath, B; Maroky, AS; Kumar, NC; Cherian, AV; Nirmala, MC (2014). "Sexual Crime in India: Is it Influenced by Pornography?". Indian J Psychol Med. 36 (2): 147–52. doi:10.4103/0253-7176.130976. PMC 4031582. PMID 24860215.
- Rathus, Spencer A; Nevid, Jeffrey S.; Fichner-Rathus, Lois (2018). Human Sexuality in a Changing World. Pearson Education. ISBN 978-0-134-52506-8.
- Desai, Devangana (1975). Erotic Sculpture of India: A Socio-cultural Study. Tata McGraw-Hill Publishing Company. ISBN 978-0-07-096384-9.
- Lidke, Jeffrey S (2003). "A Union of Fire and Water: Sexuality and Spirituality in Hinduism". In Machacek, David W; Wilcox, Melissa M (eds.). Sexuality and the World's Religions. University of Virginia: Bloomsbury Academic. ISBN 978-1-57607-359-9.
