= Kalpana House =

- Directed by: P. Chandrakumar
- Written by: Thalassery Raghavan
- Produced by: R. B. Choudary
- Starring: Kapil Dev; Shafeeq; Divya; Abhilasha
- Cinematography: P. Sukumar (Kiran)
- Edited by: K. Rajagopal
- Music by: Anu Malik
- Production company: Super Good Films
- Release date: 1989
- Country: India
- Language: Malayalam

Kalpana House is a 1989 Indian Malayalam-language horror film directed by P. Chandrakumar. The film stars Kapil Dev, Divya, Abhilasha and Shafeeq. It is an unauthorised remake of the American film Fright Night (1985). The film was dubbed and released in Hindi as Bungalow No. 666, in Tamil as Amavasai Iravil and in Telugu as Inti No 13.

== Plot ==
Tony keeps seeing strange things at his next-door neighbor's house. Coffins and strange crates come in and out of the house, and women go into the house only to disappear. Tony gets the cops involved only to prove nothing and hires a big muscle-bound ruffian to break in only to be killed. But when a vampire named John Peter visits his house and threatens his life, ending in a confrontation where Tony stabs the vampire in the hand with a paint brush, Tony then gets help from his best friend with a truly annoying laugh who directs him to a priest. The priest doesn't believe Tony's neighbor is a vampire, making John Peter drink holy water (which John Peter does) but notices John Peter doesn't cast a reflection in a mirror. John Peter turns Tony's friend into a vampire, who then attacks the priest who thwarts him with a cross. Later the priest visits Tony's house only to get attacked by Tony's friend again who turns into a vicious dog. The priest stabs Tony's friend and the werewolf dissolves. John Peter kidnaps Tony's girlfriend celine from a night club, killing a cop. The priest and the Tony kills John peter and save Celine.

== Cast ==
- Kapil Dev as John Peter/Dracula
- Shafeeq as Tony
- Divya as Celine
- Abhilasha as Sujithra, Serial actress
- Jagathy Sreekumar as Louis Fernandez
- Sathaar as David
- Nanditha Bose as Tony's Mother
- Oduvil Unnikrishnan as Priest d'Souza
- P. Sukumar
- Disco Shanthi
- Vijay
- Kalyani

== Soundtrack ==
Malayalam version

The music was composed by Anu Malik and the lyrics were written by Poovachal Khader.

Song	Singers	Lyrics
"Etho Manohariyaam"	P. Jayachandran, Sujatha Mohan	Poovachal Khader
"Nachenge Hum"	Anu Malik, Alisha Chinai	Poovachal Khader
"Nilkku Nee"	Krishnachandran, Sunanda	Poovachal Khader
''Oru Agnithan Karangal''	Krishnachandran, Sujatha Mohan	Poovachal Khader

Hindi version

Lyrics were written by Sameer.

Song	Singers	Lyrics
"Aaye Amavas Ki Raat"	Kumar Sanu	Sameer
"Naachenge Hum"	Anu Malik, Alisha Chinai	Sameer
"Chali Chali Purvai"	Nithin Mukesh, Alka Yagnik	Sameer
''Rutha Hai Mana Lenge''	Sadhana Sargam, Mohammed Aziz	Sameer
