= Gangai Karai Paattu =

- Directed by: Manivannan
- Screenplay by: Manivannan
- Story by: M. A. Kennedy
- Produced by: S. Pandian
- Starring: Varun Raj; Roopa Sree
- Cinematography: D. Shankar
- Edited by: P. Venkateswara Rao
- Music by: Deva
- Production company: Kokkintha Cine Arts
- Release date: 3 February 1995
- Country: India
- Language: Tamil

Gangai Karai Paattu is a 1995 Indian Tamil language film directed by Manivannan. The film stars Varun Raj and Roopa Sree. It was released on 3 February 1995, and became a modest success.

== Plot ==
Ganga moves from Mumbai to Yercaud with her grandfather and Raja falls in love with her but she is haunted by her past. Later when it is disclosed that she has committed a murder, Raja decides to stand by her.

== Cast ==
- Varun Raj as Raja
- Roopa Sree as Ganga (Stella Mary)
- Nizhalgal Ravi as Arjun Singh
- Manivannan as Stephen Anthony Raj
- Janagaraj as Puncture shop owner
- Mansoor Ali Khan as Sitapati
- Kovai Sarala as Anthony Raj's 2nd Wife
- Dubbing Janaki as Anthony Raj's 1st Wife
- Delhi Ganesh as Ramaiya
- Manobala as Pawn shop owner
- Halwa Vasu as Puncture shop assistant

== Soundtrack ==
The music was composed by Deva and lyrics were written by Kalidasan.

Track listing
| No. | Title | Singer(s) | Length |
|---|---|---|---|
| 1. | "Ye Nasaari" | S. P. Balasubrahmanyam, K. S. Chithra | 5:11 |
| 2. | "Maapela Thedungadi" | S. P. Balasubrahmanyam, K. S. Chithra | 4:31 |
| 3. | "Muthu Manasukule" | S. P. Balasubrahmanyam | 5:01 |
| 4. | "Oru Brundhavanathinil" | S. P. Balasubrahmanyam, K. S. Chithra | 5:07 |
| 5. | "Ponna Thodaathe" | Malaysia Vasudevan | 3:49 |
| Total length: | | | 23:39 |
