= Jungle Boy (1987 film) =

- Directed by: P. Chandrakumar
- Written by: J. C. George
- Screenplay by: P. Chandrakumar
- Produced by: P. H. Rasheed
- Starring: Irfan; Abhilasha; TG Ravi; Vijayakumar
- Cinematography: P. Chandrakumar
- Edited by: K. Rajagopal
- Music by: S. P. Venkatesh
- Production company: Karthikeya Films
- Distributed by: Karthikeya Films
- Release date: 7 June 1987
- Country: India
- Language: Malayalam

Jungle Boy is a 1987 Indian Malayalam-language film, directed by P. Chandrakumar and produced by P. H. Rasheed. The film stars Irfan, Abhilasha and T. G. Ravi. The film has musical score by S. P. Venkatesh.

== Cast ==
- Irfan as Jungle Boy
- Abhilasha as Geetha
- T. G. Ravi as DFO
- Master Kukku
- Vijayakumar
- Pattom Sadan as Velappan
- Raj Kumar
- Deepak
- Bala Singh
- P. Sukumar/ Kiran as Forest Officer Sasi

== Soundtrack ==
The music was composed by S. P. Venkatesh and the lyrics were written by Poovachal Khader.

No.	Song	Singers	Lyrics	Length (m:ss)
1	"Thaamali Thaale"	Chorus, Malaysia Vasudevan	Poovachal Khader	
2	"Thaarunyam Kaadinennum"	Vani Jairam, Pattom Sadan	Poovachal Khader	
