= Odangal =

- DVD cover
- Directed by: Ameerjan
- Written by: Vairamuthu (dialogues)
- Screenplay by: Ameerjan
- Story by: Ameerjan
- Produced by: P. S. V. Hariharan
- Starring: Sanjay Kumar; Naveena
- Cinematography: S. Ravibabu
- Edited by: S. S. Nazir
- Music by: Sampath–Selvam
- Production company: P. S. V. Pictures
- Release date: 28 November 1986
- Country: India
- Language: Tamil

Odangal (transl. Boats) is a 1986 Indian Tamil-language teen romance film directed and co-written by Ameerjan. The film stars Sanjay Kumar and newcomer Naveena, with Senthamarai, Vennira Aadai Moorthy, Manorama and Radha Ravi in pivotal roles. It was released on 28 November 1986.

== Cast ==
- Sanjay Kumar as the politician's son
- Naveena as Singathurai's daughter
- Senthamarai as Singathurai
- Vennira Aadai Moorthy as the politician
- Charle
- Peeli Sivam
- Usilai Mani
- Vellai Subbaiah
- Omakuchi Narasimhan
- Kumarimuthu
- Manorama
- Kovai Sarala
- S. N. Parvathy
- Radha Ravi as the professor

== Production ==
The film saw director Ameerjan, dialogue writer Vairamuthu and production company P. S. V. Pictures reuniting after Natpu, released earlier the same year. The filming was held at Gobichettipalayam and Ooty while the songs "Sandhana Poove" and "Poove Enna Porattam" were shot at Kotagiri. The song "Kezhavikku" was shot at Mettupalayam.

== Soundtrack ==
The soundtrack was composed by the duo Sampath–Selvam, sons of actor Kuladeivam Rajagopal, in their debut, with lyrics by Vairamuthu.

Track listing
No.	Title	Singer(s)	Length
1.	"Iyaar Ettu Nella Pola"	Malaysia Vasudevan	4:35
2.	"Yen Azhuthai Magale"	K. S. Chithra	4:31
3.	"Kadal Ponmaane"	K. J. Yesudas	4:32
4.	"Poove Enna Poraattam"	K. J. Yesudas, K. S. Chithra	4:23
5.	"Kizhavikku Muthaliravu"	Kovai Kamala and chorus	5:17
6.	"Sandana Poova Sammatham Ketka"	S. P. Balasubrahmanyam	4:38
Total length:			27:56

== Release and reception ==
Odangal was released on 28 November 1986. On the same day, The Indian Express criticised the film for its excessive violence and said Naveena "has the face and the physique that can make a good acting career. She has some talent too", but felt Sanjay was unimpressive, and appreciated Sampath–Selvam's music. Jayamanmadhan of Kalki panned the acting of the lead pair and Vairamuthu's dialogues but praised the acting of Senthamarai and Manorama, and the music.
