= Shenbaga =

Indian actress

- Born: Tuticorin, Tamil Nadu
- Other name: Shenbagam
- Occupation: Film actress
- Years active: 1991-1996

Shenbaga also known as Shenbagam is an Indian actress in Tamil and Malayalam films. She was one of the prominent lead and supporting actress in Tamil and Malayalam films from 1991 to 1996.

== Filmography ==
Year	Film	Role	Language	Notes
1991	Thoothu Po Chella Kiliye	Kasthuri	Tamil	
1992	Kalikaalam	Mary	Tamil	
1993	Ulle Veliye	Shenbagam	Tamil	
1993	Udan Pirappu		Tamil	Special appearance
1993	Pravachakan	Deepthi	Malayalam	
1993	I Love India	Anu	Tamil	
1993	Muthupandi	Suguna	Tamil	
1993	Sabash Babu		Tamil	
1994	Jallikattu Kaalai	Poovatha	Tamil	
1995	Baashha	Kavitha	Tamil	
1995	Pasumpon	Paramakudiya	Tamil	
1995	Thirumoorthy	Geetha	Tamil	
1996	Sulthan Hyderali	Mehrunnisa	Malayalam	
1996	Ammuvinte Aangalamar		Malayalam	
1996	Nandagopaalante Kusruthikal	Radhika	Malayalam	
