= Abhilasha (actress) =

Indian actress

- Born: Karnataka, India
- Occupation: Actress
- Years active: 1988–1992

Abhilasha is an Indian actress from Karnataka, who was active in the South Indian film industry, especially in the Malayalam cinema in the late 1980s. Known for her erotic roles, Abhilasha was a key figure in the Malayalam softcore films of her time. She acted in nearly 40 Malayalam softcore films and is considered as one of the forerunners of this genre in Malayalam. She got her breakthrough with Adipapam (1988), which is regarded as the first successful Malayalam film with softcore nudity. Other than Malayalam, Abhilasha has also acted in around 80 films in Tamil, Kannada, Telugu and Hindi.

== Biography ==
Abhilasha entered the film industry as a teenager in the 1987 Malayalam softcore film Jungle Boy. In 1988, she got her breakthrough with Adipapam (Original sin) directed by P. Chandrakumar. In this Malayalam softcore film set against the backdrop of the Bible, she also appeared nude. Regarded as the first successful Malayalam softcore film with nudity, it was commercially successful at the box office and grossed ₹2.5 crore against a budget of ₹7.5 lakh. The success of Adipapam made her one of the most sought B-grade actress of that time. Many soft porn films came in Malayalam in later years with Abhilasha as heroine. P. Chandrakumar then directed six films such as Kalpana House, Rathibhavam with Abhilasha as the heroine. Most of these films were successful at the box office. Abhilasha is believed to have quit acting in the early 1990s with her marriage to Kannada film director Kabiraj among the other reasons.

== Filmography ==
Year	Title	Role	Language	Notes
1986	Jawani Ki Kahani		Hindi	
1987	Jungle Boy	Geetha	Malayalam	Debut Film
1987	Kalarathrilo Kannepilla		Malayalam	
1987	Kachchi Kali		Malayalam	
1987	Jawani Ke Jalwe		Hindi	
1988	Naranatattu		Malayalam	
1988	Adipapam	Eve	Malayalam	Breakthrough Film
1988	Kanana Sundari		Malayalam	
1988	Sapno Ki Rani		Hindi	
1989	Layanam		Malayalam	
1989	Kalpana House		Malayalam	
1989	Rathibhavam		Malayalam	
1989	Thadavarayile Rajakkanmar		Malayalam	
1989	Kanoon Apna Apna		Hindi	
1989	Khuli Khidki		Hindi	
1990	Chuvanna Kannukal		Malayalam	
1990	Aalasyam		Malayalam	
1990	Enquiry		Malayalam	
1990	Urvashi		Malayalam	
1990	Rosa I love you		Malayalam	
1990	Kamsin Haseena		Hindi	
1990	Intezar Ki Raatein		Hindi	
1990	Anantha Prema		Kannada	
1990	Palaivana Paravaigal		Tamil	
1991	Mahassar		Malayalam	
1991	Vashyam		Malayalam	
1991	Shaadi Aur Barbadi		Hindi	
1991	Ang Lagaa Le		Hindi	
1991	Iduve Jeevana		Kannada	
1992	Chuvappu Thaalam		Malayalam	
1992	Rathachakram		Malayalam	
1992	Pyaar Ka Maza		Hindi	
1992	Ondu Cinema Kathe		Kannada	
1993	Pyaar Ki Jalan		Hindi	
1993	Paadhukappu		Tamil	
1993	Athiradi Abilasha		Tamil	
1993	Joker		Telugu	
1994	Aakhri Mohabbat		Hindi	
1995	Lady Killer		Hindi	
1997	Kaduva Thoma		Malayalam	
1999	Vajra Kote		Kannada	
2000	Tiger Padmini		Kannada	
