= Pidikittapulli =

- Directed by: K. S. Gopalakrishnan
- Written by: Kallayam Krishnadas
- Screenplay by: Kallayam Krishnadas
- Starring: Prameela; Ratheesh; Babysree; Balan K Nair
- Edited by: A. Sukumaran
- Music by: K. J. Joy
- Production company: Silver Screen
- Distributed by: Silver Screen
- Release date: 15 September 1986
- Country: India
- Language: Malayalam

Pidikittapulli is a 1986 Indian Malayalam-language film, directed by K. S. Gopalakrishnan. The film stars Prameela, Ratheesh, Babysree and Balan K. Nair. The film's score was composed by K. J. Joy.

The Malayalam softcore porn film features several sex scenes and nudity that were not shown to the censor board which later banned the film. The sex scenes were absent when the censor board confiscated a print of Pidikitapulli, but present when it played in a suburban Trivandrum theatre two weeks later.

== Cast ==
- Sunnywane
- Ahaana Krishna
- Mareenamichel
- Praveena
- Bheeman Raghu

== Soundtrack ==
The music was composed by K. J. Joy with lyrics by Bharanikkavu Sivakumar.

No.	Song	Singers	Length (m:ss)
1	"Oh Sugandha Vanapushpangal"	K. S. Chithra, Krishnachandran	
2	"Oru Nimisham Pala Nimisham"	Vani Jairam	
3	"Ponnelassum"	Chorus, Madhubhaskar	
