= Naale Njangalude Vivaham =

- Directed by: Sajan
- Written by: M. D. Ratnamma; Kaloor Dennis (dialogues)
- Screenplay by: Kaloor Dennis
- Starring: Shankar; Ahalya; Shafeeq; Menaka; Mukesh
- Cinematography: Selvam
- Edited by: V. P. Krishnan
- Music by: Shyam
- Production company: Sunitha Productions
- Distributed by: Sunitha Productions
- Release date: 6 January 1986
- Country: India
- Language: Malayalam

Naale Njangalude Vivaham (Tomorrow is our marriage) is a 1986 Indian Malayalam film, directed by Sajan. The film stars Shankar, Ahalya, Shafeeq, Mukesh and Menaka in the lead roles. The film has musical score by Shyam.

== Cast ==
- Shankar as Haridas
- Ahalya as Mini
- Shafeeq as Dileep
- Menaka as Indu
- Mukesh as Unni
- Jalaja as Vimala
- Sukumari as Saraswathiyamma, Haridas's mother
- Innocent as Pandit Keralaraja Gangadara Munshi
- V. D. Rajappan as Nalinakshan
- Baiju as Nanappan
- Tony as Ramesh, Dileep's friend
- Prathapachandran as Divakaran Menon
- Kalpana as Mini's friend
- Lalithasree as Superintendent Devayani
- Mala Aravindan as Mathachan
- Poojappura Ravi as Peon Pilla
- Valsala Menon as Padmavathi, Mini's mother
- Kollam Shah as Dileep's friend
- Vishnu Prakash B. as man at supply office

== Soundtrack ==
The music was composed by Shyam and the lyrics were written by Chunakkara Ramankutty.

No.	Song	Singers	Lyrics	Length (m:ss)
1	"Aalippazham"	K. S. Chithra, Chorus	Chunakkara Ramankutty	
2	"Maadhavamaasam"	K. J. Yesudas	Chunakkara Ramankutty	
