= Thoothu Po Chellakkiliye =

- Theatrical release poster
- Directed by: Kasthuri Raja
- Written by: Kasthuri Raja
- Produced by: K. Prabhakaran
- Starring: Varunraj; Senbagam; Vaidegi
- Cinematography: K. B. Ahmed
- Edited by: Lancy Mohan
- Music by: Deva
- Production company: Anbalaya Films
- Release date: 6 December 1991
- Country: India
- Language: Tamil

Thoothu Po Chellakkiliye (transl. Pet parrot, go as a messenger) is a 1991 Indian Tamil-language romantic drama film written and directed by Kasthuri Raja. The film stars Varunraj, and newcomers Senbagam and Vaidegi. It revolves around two village girls falling in love with the same man. The film was released on 6 December 1991.

== Plot ==
Two village girls (Senbagam and Vaidegi) fall in love with the same man (Varunraj).

== Cast ==
- Varunraj
- Senbagam as Kasturi
- Vaidegi as Manga
- Janagaraj as Headmaster Subramani
- Senthil as Fake Subramani
- Alex Pandian
- Judo Ramu
- K. K. Soundar
- Loose Mohan
- Kavignar Kalidasan
- S. N. Lakshmi
- Gemini Rajeswari
- Vijayachandrika
- Kalaiselvi
- Bindhu
- K. Prabhakaran

== Production ==
Actresses Senbagam and Vaidegi made their debut with this film. Actor Sanjay adopted a new name for this film, Varunraj.

== Soundtrack ==
The music was composed by Deva, with lyrics by Kalidasan.

Track listing
No.	Title	Singer(s)	Length
1.	"Thalaatu Paada Vanthen"	S. P. Balasubrahmanyam, K. S. Chithra	4:30
2.	"Vaala Kumaripulla"	Swarnalatha	2:20
3.	"Yano Yanai Azhika"	S. P. Balasubrahmanyam, K. S. Chithra	4:54
4.	"Thalaatu Paada Vanthen"	Swarnalatha	1:58
5.	"Naan Yepodhum"	S. P. Balasubrahmanyam, K. S. Chithra	4:23
6.	"Aambalainga"	Malaysia Vasudevan, Vani Jairam	4:41
7.	"Thoodhu Po"	S. Janaki	4:40
8.	"Otharuba"	K. S. Chithra	4:32
Total length:			31:58

== Release and reception ==
Thoothu Po Chellakkiliye was released on 6 December 1991. N. Krishnaswamy of The Indian Express noted the film's similarities to the director's previous En Rasavin Manasile, called the comedy subplot "puerile" and some of the songs as "soulful".
