= Sneham =

Sneham may refer to:

- Sneham (1977 film) Indian Malayalam-language directed by A Bheem Singh
- Sneham (1998 film) Indian Malayalam-language directed by Jayaraj

== See also ==
- Sneha (disambiguation)
