= Rozlyn Khan =

Indian actress and model

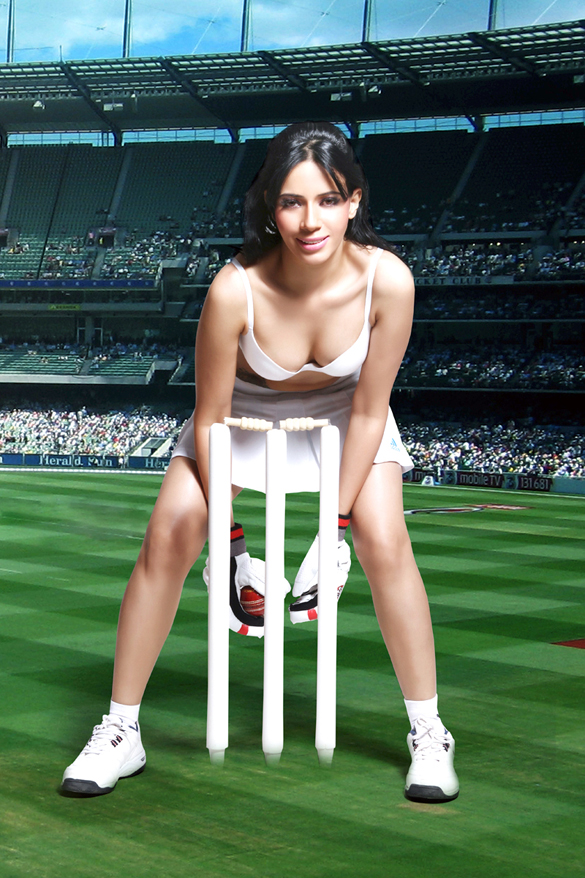
- Rozlyn Khan posing for an IPL photo shoot
- Born: Mumbai, Maharashtra, India
- Occupations: Actor, model
- Years active: 2010–present
- Modeling information
- Hair color: Black
- Eye color: Black
- Website: rozlynkhan.com

Rozlyn Khan is a Mumbai-based actress and PETA model known for her breast cancer awareness activities.

== Career ==
Khan has appeared in television advertisements, most notably for Fruity drink, Monaco biscuits and Kelvinator.

Khan appears in the film Dhama Choukdhi. with Sanjay Mishra, Mukesh Tiwari and Dipraj Rana. On 27 July 2013, Khan announced that she will be the first Bollywood star with her own web-comic. The comic launched on 4 August on her website. Khan also voiced the lead role in the animated film Savita Bhabhi.

Her television show debut was on the crime show Crime Alert on Dangal TV in 2018.

== Filmography ==
=== Film ===
Year	Title	Role	Language	Notes
2012	Dhama Choukdi	Lead actress	Hindi	
2013	Savita Bhabhi	Savita Bhabhi	Hindi	Voice role
2016	Jee Lene Do Ek Pal	Lead actress	Hindi	

=== Television ===
Year	Title	Role	Language	Notes
2018	Crime Alert	Lead actress	Hindi	
