= Adipapam =

Aadyapapam
- VCD cover
- Directed by: P. Chandrakumar
- Based on: Old Testament
- Produced by: R. B. Choudary
- Starring: Vimal Raja; Abhilasha
- Cinematography: P. Chandrakumar
- Edited by: K. Rajagopal
- Music by: Jerry Amaldev; Usha Khanna
- Production company: Super Film International
- Release date: 10 September 1988
- Running time: 87 minutes
- Country: India
- Language: Malayalam
- Budget: ₹ 7 lakh
- Box office: ₹ 2.5 crore

Adipapam (transl. Original sin) is a 1988 Indian Malayalam-language erotic film directed and filmed by P. Chandrakumar and produced by R. B. Choudary. It is based on the Old Testament and features Vimal Raja and Abhilasha as Adam and Eve, respectively. Upon release, the film grossed ₹25 million against a budget of ₹0.75 million. The film was released in Tamil as Muthal Paavam. It is regarded as the first successful Malayalam softcore film with nudity.

== Cast ==
- Vimal Raja as Adam
- Abhilasha as Eve

== Soundtrack ==
The music was composed by Jerry Amaldev and Usha Khanna, with lyrics written by Devadas.

Song	Singers
"Daivathin Srishtiyil"	P Jayachandran
"Maanavan Mannil"	K. J. Yesudas
"Snehamithallo Bhoovileeshan"	Chorus, Krishnachandran

== Reception ==
The film, made at a budget of ₹ 750,000, grossed ₹ 25 million. It is regarded as the first successful Malayalam film with softcore nudity. The success of the film inspired a series of similar productions in the next few years. Chandrakumar himself went on to direct eight more adult films and Abhilasha became the most sought B-grade actress.

== See also ==
- Malayalam softcore pornography
