= Kinnara Thumbikal =

- Directed by: R. J. Prasad
- Written by: R. J. Prasad
- Produced by: A. Salim; A. Sajneer
- Starring: Shakeela; Vipin Roy; Abin John
- Cinematography: R. J. Prasad
- Edited by: K. R. Bose
- Music by: Mano Bhaskar
- Production company: Miyami Productions
- Distributed by: Miyami
- Release date: 10 March 2000
- Running time: 110 minutes
- Country: India
- Language: Malayalam
- Budget: ₹12 lakh
- Box office: ₹4 crore

Kinnara Thumbikal ('Lovelorn dragonflies') is a 2000 Indian low-budget erotic film written, directed, and filmed by R. J. Prasad. It stars Shakeela in the lead role. The film was dubbed in at least six Indian languages. It was a major commercial success, grossing ₹40 million at the box office against a budget of ₹1.2 million. The success of Kinnarathumbigal would go on to pioneer a new wave of low-budget Malayalam softcore porn films in Kerala.

== Plot ==
The setting of the story is a cold hilly village in Kerala, rich with tea plantation. Gopu is a boy who stays with his aunt Janaki, who is a tea plantation worker and her daughter, Devu. Janaki's co-worker, Dakshayani is the first contact neighbor of the family. Dakshayani is in an open relationship with the supervisor of the plantation.

Janaki is looking for a suitable groom for Devu. However, the supervisor, who is interested in Devu, blocks the possible alliances for her. Dakshayani, being a woman with strong physical needs, tries to seduce Gopu, who eludes her grasp. From Dakshayani, Gopu learns that since Devu is his aunt's daughter, there is a possibility of marrying her, even though Devu is older than him. Gradually, Gopu gets infatuated with Devu. Soon Gopu realizes that Devu is interested in him as well. Gopu and Devu finally find love. They roam as a couple in the village. When everything goes as planned, Janaki catches Gopu and Devu making love. Janaki expels Gopu from her home.

Meanwhile, the supervisor finds his own ways to abduct Devu and make her his wife. The supervisor is very adamant about marrying Devu. Gopu finds home in Dakshayani's house. Will Gopu reunite with the love of his life ? Will he meet his ambition of having Devu on his side? The movie ends on a bittersweet note.

== Cast ==
- Shakeela as Dakshyani
- Hema as Devu
- Salim Kumar as tea shop owner
- Aravind M S as tea shop waiter
- Kuttyedathi Vilasini as Janaki
- Thodupuzha Vasanthi
- Vipin Roy as Gopu (voiceover by Jayan Cherthala)
- Sanju
- Kothiyan as Sanju's cousin

== Production ==
The film was given an adult certificate despite having less intimate scenes than other films, which were not A-rated.

== Soundtrack ==
The film features one song titled "Kinnaarathumbikal" composed by Mano Bhaskar, written by Sreekumaran Thampi and sung by K. S. Chithra.

== Reception ==
The film was a major commercial success at the box office. Made on a budget of ₹12 lakh, the film grossed ₹4 crore at theatres. Its success triggered a series of similar low budget softporn films being produced in Malayalam cinema. According to Shakeela, she initially didn't register that the film was a success as she didn't understand Malayalam at the time, but knew something had changed as she was approached for autographs.

== See also ==
- Malayalam softcore pornography
- Shakeela
