= Shafeeq (actor) =

Indian actor

Shafeeq Ambalapurath
- Born: Kozhikode, India
- Other names: Sanjay; Varun Raj
- Occupation: Actor
- Years active: 1986, 2016

Shafeeq Ambalapurath is an Indian actor who has primarily worked in Malayalam, Telugu and Tamil films.

His debut Malayalam film Love Story was a sensational hit and he was considered a rival to Rahman, the romantic hero of Malayalam films. It was Shafeeq who brought Break Dance movements in Malayalam films, but his subsequent movies like Naalae Njngalude Vivaham failed and he could not sustain his success.

His Tamil entry as Sanjay in Odangal was also met with an indifferent response. He later did low-budget films like Kalpana House.

In the 1990s, he rechristened himself as Varun Raj, grew a moustache and tried working again in Tamil films like Thoothu Po Chellakiliye, Padhukappu, Athipathi and Manivannan' s Gangai Karai Paattu, with little success. He has also done a Bollywood movie titled Khuli Khidki.

== Partial filmography ==
Year	Film	Role	Language	Notes
1986	Love Story	Raju	Malayalam	
1986	Naale Njangalude Vivaham	Dileep	Malayalam	
1986	Aavanazhi		Malayalam	
1986	Odangal		Tamil	
1987	Ishtam Tharoo		Malayalam	
1987	Nandhi		Malayalam	
1987	Ithrayum Kaalam		Malayalam	
1987	Mangalya Charthu	Dileep	Malayalam	
1987	Kalaratrilo Kannepilla		Telugu	
1989	Khuli Khidki		Hindi	
1989	Kalpana House	Tony	Malayalam	
1991	Thoothu Po Chellakkiliye		Tamil	
1991	Pudhiya Raagam	Gopi	Tamil	
1992	Thummeda		Telugu	
1993	Paadhukappu		Tamil	
1993	Preme Na Pranam		Telugu	
1993	Jeevithame Oka Cinema		Telugu	
1994	Veettai Paar Naattai Paar		Tamil	
1994	Shhh. Gup Chup		Telugu	
1995	Gangai Karai Paattu		Tamil	
1997	Athipathi		Tamil	
