= Vashyam =

- Directed by: Suresh Unnithan
- Starring: Abhilasha; Harish Kumar
- Music by: A. T. Ummer
- Production company: Sree Bhuvaneswari Movie Arts
- Distributed by: Sree Bhuvaneswari Movie Arts
- Release date: 1991
- Country: India
- Language: Malayalam

Vashyam is a 1991 Indian Malayalam film, directed by Suresh Unnithan. The film stars Abhilasha and Harish Kumar in the lead roles. The film has musical score by A. T. Ummer.

== Cast ==
- Abhilasha
- Harish Kumar

== Soundtrack ==
The music was composed by A. T. Ummer and the lyrics were written by Poovachal Khader.

No.	Song	Singers	Lyrics	Length (m:ss)
1	"Maanasa Yamunayile"	K. J. Yesudas	Poovachal Khader	
2	"Oru Poomaarithan Kuliril"	K. J. Yesudas, K. S. Chithra	Poovachal Khade	
3	"Raavinmohamnjan"	K. S. Chithra	Poovachal Khader	
