= Kalikaalam (1992 film) =

- Title card
- Directed by: Panchu Arunachalam
- Screenplay by: Panchu Arunachalam
- Produced by: Ar. Shanmuga Nathan; P. Ar. Subramaniam
- Starring: Radhika; Nizhalgal Ravi
- Cinematography: T. S. Vinayagam
- Edited by: N. Chandran
- Music by: Ilaiyaraaja
- Production company: Geetha Chitra Combines
- Release date: 11 July 1992
- Country: India
- Language: Tamil

Kalikaalam (transl. Kali Yuga) is a 1992 Indian Tamil-language drama film directed and written by Panchu Arunachalam. The film stars Radhika and Nizhalgal Ravi. It is a remake of the Telugu film of same name. The film was released on 11 July 1992.

== Plot ==
Raghuram, a daily wage worker, faces many challenges while earning for his family. He struggles hard to make money for the marriage of his children.

== Cast ==
- Radhika as Janaki
- Nizhalgal Ravi as Raghuraman
- Janagaraj
- Shenbagam as Mary
- Shanmugham as Karthik
- Poorani
- Vivek as Krishnamoorthy's son
- Vennira Aadai Moorthy as Krishnamoorthy
- Delhi Ganesh
- Crazy Mohan
- Subbu Panchu as a dancer in song "Kadhal Illamal"

== Production ==
Kalikaalam was directed by Panchu Arunachalam, who also wrote the screenplay and dialogue. The film was produced by Ar. Shanmuga Nathan and P. Ar. Subramaniam under Geetha Chitra Combines. Cinematography was handled by T. S. Vinayagam, and edited by N. Chandran. The film marked the acting debut of Shanmugham.

== Soundtrack ==
The soundtrack was composed by Ilaiyaraaja. Arunachalam also worked as lyricist.

Track listing
No.	Title	Singer(s)	Length
1.	"Kadhal Illaamal"	Mano, Swarnalatha	4:44
2.	"Kaalam Kali Kaalam"	Ilaiyaraaja	4:54
3.	"Manidhan Pogum Poku"	Ilaiyaraaja, Minmini	2:34
4.	"Meendum Vandhadho"	Minmini, Swarnalatha	0:52

== Release and reception ==
Kalikaalam was released on 11 July 1992. Ayyappa Prasad of The Indian Express said, "The screenplay and dialogue by Panchu Arunachalam as well as the story are good since the stress is on the materialistic younger generation but the film is marred by poor direction and technical flaws."
