= Sex in Indian entertainment =

In Indian film and television, the taboo about the depiction of sexuality has been declining. However, many Bollywood films, with an emphasis on the urban upper class, rarely depict the true values that most Indians have about sex. There is a great taboo on sex in India due to a variety of reasons, many of which involve cultural values.

The content is subject to approval and categorization by the Central Board of Film Certification.

An example of the taboo toward sexuality in parts of India is the controversy surrounding the film Fire (1996), which depicted a lesbian relationship. Mainstream films still largely cater to the conservative masses, however art films and foreign films containing sexuality are watched by urbanite (educated/literate) Indians with the internet being a major source. While Bollywood is more liberal than in the past, sex is still a taboo subject and a vast majority of films do not expand on the sexual aspect of romance, despite the fact that most Bollywood films are love stories.

A legitimate pornography industry has not emerged within India. Instead, many low-quality foreign made films featuring Indians are made abroad and then imported.

== See also ==
- Sex in film
- Sexuality in India
- Pornography in India
