= Shakeela =

Indian actress and politician

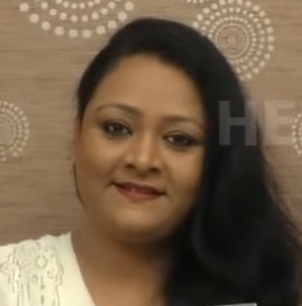
- Shakeela in 2018
- Born: Shakeela Begum; Chennai, Tamilnadu, India
- Other name: Shakila
- Occupations: Actress; Politician; Softcore pornographic actress
- Years active: 1994–present
- Political party: Indian National Congress

C. Shakeela is an Indian actress, politician and former softcore pornography actress who has predominantly acted in Malayalam softcore pornography , in addition to Tamil, Telugu and Kannada language films. She is a member of Indian National Congress.

Shakeela debuted in the softcore pornographic film Playgirls (1995) at the age of 18. She became a popular figure in Kerala with the release of Malayalam softcore film Kinnara Thumbikal in 2000. This film would go on to pioneer a new wave of low-budget softcore porn films in the state, with Shakeela starring in many of them. In Kerala's hero-centric mainstream industry of her time, Shakeela's emergence as a liberated woman, who displays her sexuality in defiance of social norms, led to what became known as Malayalam cinema's Shakeela tharangam (Shakeela wave).

== Early life ==
Shakeela was born in Chennai, Tamil Nadu into a Muslim family. Her mother was from Nellore in Andhra Pradesh. She could not complete her school leaving certificate examination, eventually making her foray into films.

== Career ==
From the beginning of her career, she acted in B movies and softcore pornography. One of her big hits was the 2000 Malayalam film Kinnarathumbikal, which brought her into limelight. Kinnarathumbikal was dubbed in at least six Indian languages and was a major commercial success, grossing ₹40 million at the box office against a budget of ₹1.2 million. She did a few controversial topless scenes in her initial movies until she got noticed. Her B movies were dubbed and released in almost all Indian languages as well as in some foreign languages like Nepalese, Chinese, and Sinhala. After she acted in several movies, the soft-porn movies in India were colloquially called as "Shakeela films". Shakeela hired a body double, Surayya Banu, to do her topless scenes.

Shakeela started appearing in family character roles in Tamil, Telugu and Kannada language movies from 2003. She wrote her autobiography in Malayalam, which covered her family, her background, as well as her acquaintance with notable film personalities, politicians and childhood friends.

In January 2018, she announced her 250th film as an actor, Sheelavathi, would begin production.

== Personal life ==
In 2002, Shakeela announced that she will no longer act in B grade movies. Shakeela released her autobiography Shakeela: Aatmakatha in 2013.

== Politics ==
Shakeela joined the Indian National Congress in March 2021.

== Partial filmography ==
Shakeela has featured in over 250 in Malayalam, Tamil, Hindi, Telugu, and Kannada language films in various roles.

=== Malayalam films ===
Year	Film	Role	Notes
1997	Sobhanam		
1998	Kulirkaattu		
1999	Captain		
2000	Raakkilikal		
2000	Thankathoni		
2000	Nishasurabhikal		
2000	Kaathara		
2000	Manjukaalappakshi		
2000	Neela Thadakathile Nizhal Pakshikal		
2000	Kinnara Thumbikal	Dakshyani	
2001	Koumaram		
2001	Agrahaaram		
2001	Yaamini		
2001	Vezhambal		
2001	Pranayaaksharangal		
2001	Naalam Simham		
2001	Laya Thalangal		
2001	Kaadambari		
2001	Agnipushpam		
2001	Naalaam Simham		
2001	Driving School		
2001	Ee Raavil		
2001	Kinnaaram Chollicholli		
2001	Nimishangal		
2001	Maami		
2001	Romance		
2001	Kalluvaathukkal Kathreena		
2001	Premaagni		
2001	Chaarasundari		
2001	Mohanayanangal		
2001	Laasyam		
2001	Swargavaathil		
2001	Aalilathoni		
2002	Sneha		
2002	Soundarya Lahari		
2002	Pushpasharam		
2002	Randu Penkuttikal		
2002	Niramulla Swapnangal		
2002	Eden Thottam		
2002	Aalinganam		
2002	Uff Yeh Jawani		
2002	Sisiram		
2002	Mohaswapnam		
2002	Pranaya Shalabhangal		
2002	Miss Suvarna		
2002	Namukkoru Koodaram		
2002	Thirunelliyile Penkutty		
2003	Ananthapuram Raajakumaari		
2003	Veendum Thulabharam		
2004	Sandra		
2007	Chotta Mumbai	Herself	
2011	Teja Bhai & Family		
2012	Iniyum Oru Janmam		
2013	Neelakurinji Poothu		
2015	Six		

=== Other language films ===
Year	Film	Role	Language	Notes
1994	Playgirls		Tamil	
1994	Jallikattu Kaalai	Pushpavanam	Tamil	
1996	Vasantha Vaasal	Sunitha	Tamil	
1998	Ponnu Velayira Bhoomi		Tamil	
1998	Udhavikku Varalaamaa	item number	Tamil	
1998	Marumalarchi		Tamil	
2001	Nayeem And Shakeela		Telugu	
2001	Sneha		Tamil	
2001	Sagara		Kannada	
2001	Agniputhri		Telugu	
2002	Soundharyalahari		Telugu	
2002	Thotti Gang	Matasri	Telugu	
2002	Penmanassu		Telugu	
2003	Duppatlo Dhada Dhada		Telugu	
2003	Jayam	Gnana Saraswathi	Telugu	
2003	Jayam	Gnana Sarawathi	Tamil	
2003	Nijam		Telugu	
2003	Dongodu		Telugu	
2003	Dhool	Herself	Tamil	
2004	Puttintiki Ra Chelli		Telugu	
2004	Monalisa	College principal	Kannada	
2004	Singara Chennai		Tamil	
2004	Loves	Herself	Tamil	
2005	786 Khaidi Premakatha		Telugu	
2005	Keelu Gurram		Telugu	
2005	Thaka Thimi Tha	Rama	Tamil	
2005	Sorry Enaku Kalyanamayidichu	Baby	Tamil	
2006	Shri		Kannada	
2006	Bangaram	Ammukutty	Telugu	
2006	Thodamaley		Tamil	
2006	Vathiyar	Item number	Tamil	
2007	Viyabari	Minister Dairy Development	Tamil	
2007	Azhagiya Tamil Magan	Shakeela	Tamil	
2007	Pazhaniappa Kalloori	Chechi	Tamil	
2008	Vambu Sandai		Tamil	
2008	Black & White		Telugu	
2008	Paape O Parupu		Telugu	
2008	Nadigai	Herself	Tamil	
2008	Dongala Bandi		Telugu	
2009	Kempa	Bindu's mother	Kannada	
2009	Current		Telugu	
2009	Siva Manasula Sakthi	Sakthi	Tamil	
2009	Malai Malai		Tamil	
2010	Boss Engira Bhaskaran	Parimala teacher	Tamil	
2010	Maanja Velu	Mathangi	Tamil	
2010	Vallakottai	Saleswoman	Tamil	
2011	Guru Sishyan		Tamil	
2011	Ninety		Kannada	
2012	Kai		Tamil	
2013	Ragalaipuram		Tamil	
2013	Ade Baaja		Telugu	
2014	Adhu Vera Idhu Vera		Tamil	
2015	Romantic Target		Telugu	
2015	Patharagitthi		Kannada	
2015	Vasuvum Saravananum Onna Padichavanga	Akila Cheichi	Tamil	
2015	Luv U Alia		Kannada	
2015	Sakalakala Vallavan	Herself	Tamil	
2017	Sevili		Tamil	
2019	Pottu	Biochemistry Professor	Tamil	
2019	Kobbari Matta	Pandu	Telugu	
2020	Kanni Raasi	Chechi	Tamil	
2021	Engada Iruthinga Ivvalavu Naala	Shakeela	Tamil	
2023	Kick	Ad Council secretary	Tamil	
2025	Madha Gaja Raja	Marriage attendee	Tamil	
2025	Mrs & Mr	Shakeela	Tamil	
2025	Sareeram		Tamil	
2025	Pagal Kanavu		Tamil	
2025	Madharas Mafia Company		Tamil	

== Television ==
Year	Title	Role	Channel	Language	Notes
2014	Bigg Boss Kannada (season 2)	Contestant	Star Suvarna	Kannada	Evicted Day 27
2016	Health Education	Host	YouTube	Tamil	Telecasted on Interactive TV Channel
2016	Comedy Super Nights 2	Herself	Flowers TV	Malayalam	Episode 5
2018	Adhu Idhu Yedhu	Participant	Star Vijay	Tamil	
2019	Comedy Stars	Herself	Asianet	Malayalam	Guest
2019	Janakeeya Kodathi	Guest speaker	24 News	Malayalam	
2020	Funny Nights with Pearle Maaney	Herself	Zee Keralam	Malayalam	Guest
2020-2021	Cooku With Comali (Season 2)	Contestant	Star Vijay	Tamil	1st Runner-Up
2021	Alitho Saradaga	Herself	ETV	Telugu	Episode 211
2021	Start Music (Season 2)	Contestant	Star Vijay	Tamil	Winner
2021	Kanni Theevu Ullasa Ulagam 2.0	Raja Mata	Colours Tamil	Tamil	
2021	Singapenney	Participant	Star Vijay	Tamil	
2021	Cash	Participant	E TV	Telugu	
2023–2025	Surabhiyum Suhasiniyum	Urmila	Flowers TV	Malayalam	TV serial
2023	Flowers Oru Kodi	Participant	Flowers TV	Malayalam	Gameshow
2023	Star magic	Mentor	Flowers TV	Malayalam	Gameshow
2023	Bigg Boss (Telugu season 7)	Contestant	Star Maa	Telugu	Evicted Day 14

== Popularity and reception ==
Shakeela, who rose to fame quickly, served as her movies' main character and the centre of its story. According to film industry analyst Sreedhar Pillai, Shakeela's stardom extended beyond state boundaries as well, with these films getting their own dubbed versions across the country. As a result, for thousands of that generation, their only access to Malayalam cinema was the kind that would star Shakeela. According to critic and film historian C. S. Venkiteswaran, Shakeela became known as the promiscuous Malayali woman in nearby areas like Tamil Nadu and Karnataka, where words like "chechi" or "aunty" were sarcastically used to refer to them. The prejudice that these films appealed to in other states was furthered by the fact that Kerala had a distinctive sartorial culture where ladies wore a lungi and a blouse. And it added yet another depth to their fantasies about these ladies when they included yet another widely held stereotype of the missing Malayali males employed in the Gulf.

According to film director Venkiteswaran, Shakeela eventually became highest paid employee on the set, and the production of the movie was planned around her comfort. She has said in many interviews that how these production teams would trick her into acting as many as three films at once without her knowledge, flooding the market with her films. The fly-by-night studios made more money during this time, more so than the actors who played the leads in these films. According to film scholar Darshana Sreedhar Mini, during the Malayalam cinema industry's crisis in the early 2000s, Shakeela films' success became essential to the industry's existence because her presence guaranteed profit and, thus, the survival of these personnel. In 2001, more than 70% of Malayalam films were of the soft porn genre, and she appeared in many of them. Popular Malayalam films at the period focused on showing heroic masculinity and completely muted the agential role of women. Shakeela's films, in contrast, stood out because they emphasised her presence to the point where the male roles served as functional filler. In actuality, the majority of Shakeela's male co-stars were little more than "extras," with unimpressive careers. Shakeela's presence during a period of economic crisis temporarily destabilised Kerala's hero-centric mainstream business, giving rise to the Shakeela tharangam (wave of Shakeela).

== In popular culture ==
Indrajit Lankesh directed her biopic Shakeela (2020) based on her life in which Richa Chadda portrays the title character. On 22 September 2023, a 5-minute sketch featuring Shakeela was released by Netflix on YouTube to promote the concluding season of their series Sex Education, among the Malayali audience. The sketch titled "'Shakeela's driving school" was also a reminiscent of her successful film Driving School.

== See also ==
- Reshma
- Silk Smitha
- Malayalam softcore pornography
