= Savita Bhabhi =

Fictional pornographic cartoon character

- Savita Bhabhi character
- Savita Bhabhi in Miss India Part 1
- First appearance: "The Bra Salesman"
- Created by: Kirtu; Puneet Agarwal
- Voiced by: Rozlyn Khan

In-universe information
- Full name: Savita Patel
- Nickname: Saavi
- Gender: Female
- Occupation: Housewife, Restaurant owner later in the comics
- Spouse: Ashok Patel
- Significant others: Kunal Uncle, Alex, Shobha, Annie
- Nationality: Indian
- Age: 32

Savita Bhabhi is a fictional Indian adult comic character, created by Kirtu Comics. The protagonist was promoted mainly through comics. It has since been converted into a subscription-based strip.

== History ==
The character proved controversial in India when introduced in 2008, due to conservatism present in Indian society. Some critics felt it represented the face of India's new ultra-liberal section.

A Savita Bhabhi film was released in May 2013; it deals with the subject of internet censorship in a humorous way with Savita Bhabhi as the heroine who saves the day.

== Controversies ==
"Wow, India has now joined the elite club of China, Iran, North Korea and suchlike in the area of Internet censorship."

— Graphic novelist Sarnath Banerjee on the ban of Savita Bhabhi.

Production of pornography in India is broadly illegal. As a result, the original website was censored by the Indian government under its anti-pornography laws. This was met with criticism from the likes of Indian libertarian blogger and journalist Amit Varma. Eventually, mainstream media columnists joined in criticizing the ban as reflecting a "meddlesome, patriarchal mindset" of a "Net Nanny" government. This resulted in an online movement to save the character from being destroyed.

Initially the creators of the site chose to remain anonymous, going under the assumed collective name Indian Porn Empire. However, in 2009, the creator of the site Puneet Agarwal, a second generation Indian living in the UK revealed his identity in an attempt to fight against the ban. However a month later, due to family pressure he announced his decision to take down the comic strip.

The presence of a character bearing a resemblance to Bollywood actor Amitabh Bachchan was also met with criticism on Indian television channels.

== Adaptations ==
- The producers of the 2011 Indian comedy film Sheetal Bhabhi.com, have claimed that it draws inspiration from Savita Bhabhi.
- Savita Bhabhi, a film based on the character, was released in 2013 by Kirtu.
- Sai Tamhankar plays a character based on Savita Bhabhi in Alok Rajwade's 2020 Indian Marathi-language film Ashleel Udyog Mitra Mandal.

== See also ==
- Pornography in India
- Censorship in India
