= Chuvanna Kannukal =

- Directed by: Sasi Mohan
- Produced by: Chaithanya Arts
- Music by: Jerry Amaldev
- Release date: 1990
- Country: India
- Language: Malayalam

Chuvanna Kannukal is a 1990 Indian Malayalam film directed by Sasi Mohan and produced by Chaithanya Arts. The film has a musical score by Jerry Amaldev.

== Cast ==
- Master Raghu
- Kapil
- V. K. Sreeraman
- Jagathi Sreekumar
- Mala Aravindan
- Abhilasha
- Uma maheswari
- Sugandhi
- Shyamala
- Padma

== Soundtrack ==
The music was composed by Jerry Amaldev and the lyrics were written by Poovachal Khader.

No.	Song	Singers	Lyrics	Length (m:ss)
1	"Kallolam"	Sujatha Mohan, Unni Menon, Krishnachandran	Poovachal Khader	
2	"Then Thulumbum"	K. S. Chithra, P. Jayachandran	Poovachal Khader	
