= Panangattiri =

Village in Kollengode, Kerala, India

Panangattiri is a village in Kollengode, Palakkad district of Kerala state, India.

Venkitachalapathy temple is a popular attraction. Every year in April, the temple celebrates Prathista Dhinam, organised by Gramma Brahmana Samooham.
