= Reshma (Malayalam actress) =

Indian actress (disappeared in 2008)

- Born: Asma Bhanu; Karnataka, India
- Occupation: Actress
- Years active: 1996–2005

Reshma (born Asma Bhanu) is a former Indian film actress from Karnataka, known for her work in South Indian B-grade or softcore porn films, particularly in the Malayalam language. She was one of the most sought-after erotic actresses in the South Indian softcore porn industry during her career, and was a key figure in the Malayalam softcore film in the early 2000s. Reshma also appeared in a few mainstream Kannada films. Her career ended between 2003 and 2005, due to the rapid surge of the internet in India among other reasons. Reshma disappeared in 2008 and is reportedly living in Karnataka with her family.

== Career ==
A native of Mysore, Karnataka, Reshma began her acting career with the Kannada film Asai Noor. In the late '90s, soft-porn or B-grade films started appearing in the Malayalam film industry. It was during this time that Reshma's dubbed film Mayoori (2000) was released in Kerala in Malayalam. Reshma made her Malayalam debut with the role of Damayanthi in the film Kaumaram, directed by A. T. Joy. She then played the titular role in A. T. Joy's movie Lovely, which was commercially successful and marked her breakthrough in Malayalam cinema. Following this success, she starred in another film titled Nalam Simham, whose title was similar to the Malayalam film Narasimham, starring Mohanlal.

Reshma tried to change the direction of her career by playing a non-glamorous character in Natar Raghu's film Love Letter. However, the film stalled midway. Following this, she returned to her previous path. In 2002, she acted in the films Nirappakittu and Asura Yugam. Reshma soon faced a sudden downfall in her career due to the rapid internet surge in India, which led to a decrease in the sale of B-grade movie CDs. This was a major setback for the entire South Indian soft porn industry, and many B-grade actresses, including Reshma, were forced to leave the industry in 2005.

== Filmography ==
Year	Title	Role	Ref.
1999	Bas Karo Tum		
2000	Bali Umar		
2001
2001	Kinavu Pole	Shibani	
2001	Layathalangal		
2001	Aalilathoni		
2001	Thirunelliyile Penkutty	Pallavi	
2001	Louli		
2001	Tharunnyam		
2001	Lasyam		
2001	Naalaam Simham		
2001	Mohanayanangal	Sicily	
2002
2002	Qatil Dilruba		
2002	Sugandhavally		
2002	Premasallapam		
2002	Mohaswapnam		
2002	Doctor Prema		
2002	Asurayugam		
2002	Apsara		
2002	Adenthottam	Reetha	
2002	Aalolam Kili	Aishwarya	
2002	Nisagandhi		
2002	Nakhachithrangal	Nancy Fernandez	
2002	Madhuram		
2002	Diana	Reshma	
2002	Sneha	Sneha	
2002	Yamam	Greeshma	
2002	Kiske Liye Yeh Jawani		
2002	Soundharyalahari		
2003	Vivadam	Suma	
2003	Sundarikutty		

== Popularity and legacy ==
Within a few years of Reshma's entry into the softcore porn industry, the fame of Shakeela, the popular softcore porn actress of that time, declined. Even though Reshma completely left the industry in 2005, her videos remain a significant source of revenue for porn websites in India. According to film scholar Darshana Sreedhar Mini, "Reshma was more daring with her co-stars and more camera-friendly. She reportedly received around ₹5 lakhs per film during 1998-99. The remuneration was very high even by today's standards. But Reshma was riding high on a boom that was propelling the South Indian (especially Malayalam) porn industry at that time."

According to film analyst Sunil Mannannur, "Reshma is an actress who entered the privacy of Malayalees and enlivened their days and nights. She had the reputation of being the most beautiful B-grade actress from South India and the title of 'lucky star,' as most of the films she acted in became super hits. Even when many superstar films failed at the box office, Reshma's B-grade films were money-spinners. Today's audiences have forgotten Reshma, apart from enjoying her movies. No one thinks about where she is, what she is doing, or how she is living. There is no need to think about it now, because there are porn stars ahead of Reshma at our fingertips today. Not only Reshma but other actresses of that time, who sent the audience into a frenzy, went into oblivion when the audience wandered in search of differences."

== Disappearance ==
In December 2007, the police took Reshma, along with two other women and two agents, into custody from a hotel in Kochi, allegedly for sex work. The police allegedly denied Reshma the right to be accompanied by a woman police officer during questioning. The businessmen or clients who were rounded up in the police raid were allegedly let off immediately. A policeman took her phone, started recording his interrogation on it, and threatened her. The video was later leaked. Reshma was charged under various sections of the IPC but was later granted bail. After this incident, she disappeared a year later, reportedly moving to a different city. In 2017, the actress Shakeela claimed during an interview that she has contact with Reshma and revealed that she is living discreetly in a small town in Karnataka.

== See also ==
- Shakeela
- Silk Smitha
- Malayalam softcore pornography
