= Khuli Khidki =

- Promotional Poster
- Directed by: P. Chandrakumar
- Produced by: Sanjhesh Ahuja
- Starring: Shafeeq; Neeta Puri; Aruna Irani; Amjad Khan; Gajendra Chauhan
- Cinematography: P. Sukumar
- Music by: Usha Khanna
- Release date: 10 November 1989
- Country: India
- Language: Hindi

Khuli Khidki is a 1989 Bollywood masala film directed by P. Chandrakumar and starring Shafeeq, Neeta Puri, Abhilasha, Gajendra Chauhan, Aruna Irani, Amjad Khan, Disco Shanti and Tiku Talsania in lead roles.

== Plot ==
Khuli Khidki tells the story of a man and his masculine instincts that brings changes in him after his love relationship.

== Cast ==
- Shafeeq
- Satyen Kappu
- Tiku Talsania
- Gajendra Chauhan
- Aruna Irani
- Disco Shanti
- Abhilasha
- Amjad Khan
- Neeta Puri
- Jaya Mala

== Soundtrack ==
- "Chalo Chalen" - Anuradha Paudwal, Vinod Rathore
- "Sonia Mera Naam Hai" - Anuradha Paudwal
- "Door Door Kyun Hai" - Anuradha Paudwal
- "Palat Palat Palat" - Udit Narayan, Sarika Kapoor
