= Savita Bhabhi (film) =

- Directed by: Puneet Agarwal
- Written by: Rahul
- Based on: Savita Bhabhi
- Produced by: Kirtu; Deshmukh
- Starring: Rozlyn Khan
- Music by: Nitin Kumar Gupta
- Release date: 4 May 2013
- Running time: 27 min
- Country: India
- Language: Hindi

Savita Bhabhi is a 2013 Indian adult animated science fiction pornographic short film created by businessman Puneet Agarwal (also known as Deshmukh). It was released on 4 May 2013. The film was released on web in India because of censorship reasons.

== Plot ==
In 2070, Bombay City is a high-tech metropolis of flying cars, powered by petrol thanks to unlimited oil reserves discovered on the Moon. The city is largely content, but Suraj is frustrated by the government's ban on pornography. Unable to find online videos, he discovers Kirtu and Savita Bhabhi, then visits his technologically gifted friend Hari, who has developed a virtual reality simulator capable of entering the digital dimension. At Suraj's urging, they enter the comics dimension during a strip poker game in Savita Bhabhi episode 17, "Double Trouble 2".

A thunder strike on Hari's house causes the machine to malfunction, accidentally bringing Savita Bhabhi into the film's dimension with them. She demands to return home, but Hari explains that the machine is broken and needs time to repair. While waiting, Suraj comforts Bhabhi and tells her about the government's restrictions: Tech Minister Mr Rakesh Mehta has banned all pornography websites. Bhabhi suggests that Mehta's repression may stem from his own frustration.

Hari then reveals that his supplier has been raided and that the parts required to repair the simulator are now in the tech minister's custody. Bhabhi proposes stealing them. Hari devises a plan, and Savita Bhabhi adopts the role of a secret agent to obtain the components. She seduces the minister, ultimately ruining his career and enabling them to recover the parts needed to repair the machine.

== Voice cast ==
- Rozlyn Khan as Savita Bhabhi
