= Kanana Sundari =

- Directed by: P. Chandrakumar
- Produced by: S. Kumar Sastha Productions
- Starring: P. Sukumar; Abhilasha
- Music by: Jerry Amaldev
- Production company: Sastha Productions
- Distributed by: Sastha Productions
- Release date: 1988
- Country: India
- Language: Malayalam

Kanana Sundari (transl. Jungle beauty) is a 1988 Indian Malayalam-language film directed by P. Chandrakumar and produced by S. Kumar. The film stars P. Sukumar and Abhilasha in the lead roles. The film has musical score by Jerry Amaldev.

== Cast ==
- P. Sukumar (Kiran)
- Abhilasha
- Vidyasree
- Roshni
- Jaffer Khan
- Gajendra Chouhan

== Soundtrack ==
The music was composed by Jerry Amaldev and the lyrics were written by Devadas.

No.	Song	Singers	Lyrics	Length (m:ss)
1	"Prayamayya"	S. Janaki	Devadas	
2	"Thamburaane"	Chorus	Devadas	
