= Sexuality in India =

India has developed its discourse on sexuality differently based on its distinct regions with their own unique cultures. According to R.P. Bhatia, a New Delhi psychoanalyst and psychotherapist, middle-class India's "very strong repressive attitude" has made it impossible for many married couples to function well sexually, or even to function at all.

== Background ==
The seeming contradictions of Indian attitudes towards sex (more broadly – sexuality) can be best explained through the context of history. India played a role in shaping understandings of sexuality, and it could be argued that one of the first pieces of literature that treated "Kama" as science came from the Indian subcontinent. It may be argued that historically, India pioneered the use of sexual education through various art forms like sculptures, paintings, pieces of literature. As in all societies, there was a difference in sexual practices in India between common people and powerful rulers, with people in power often indulging in "self-gratification" lifestyles that were not representative of common moral attitudes. Moreover, there are distinct cultural differences seen through the course of history across India.

== Ancient times ==
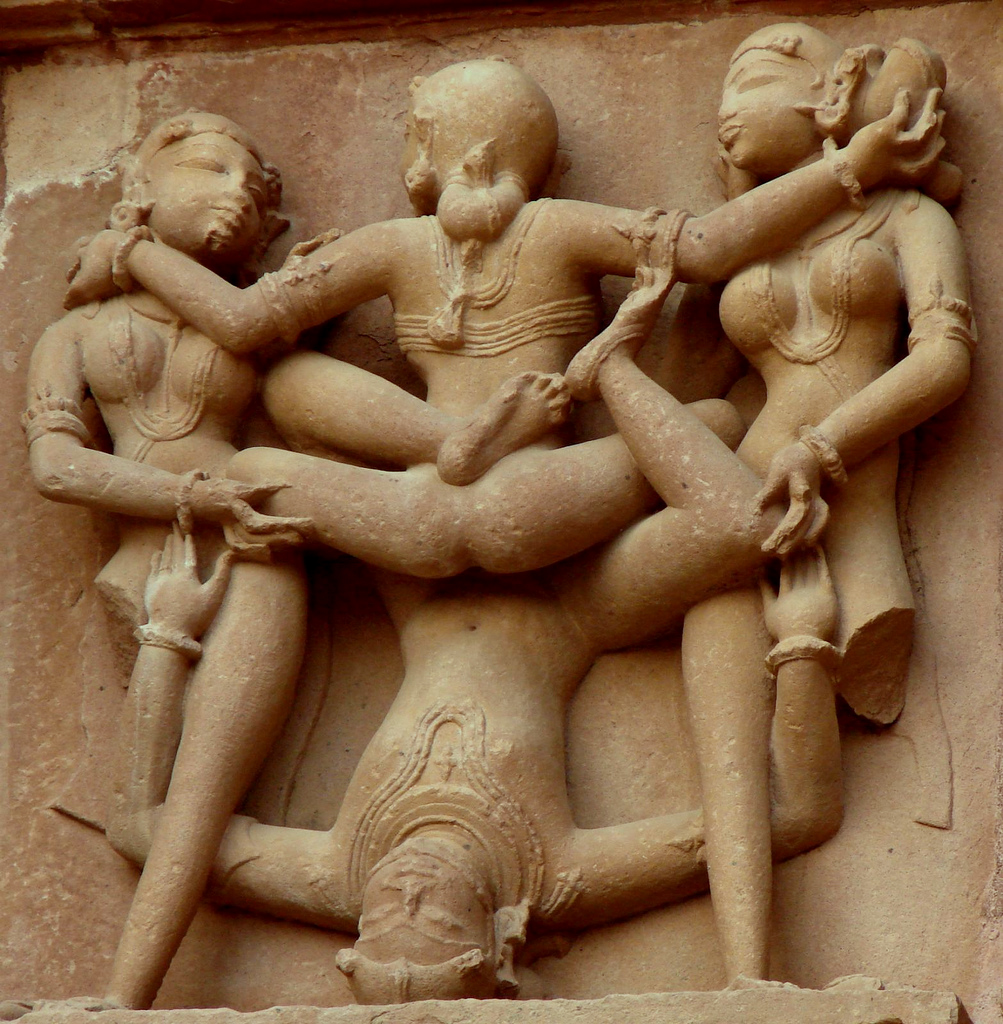
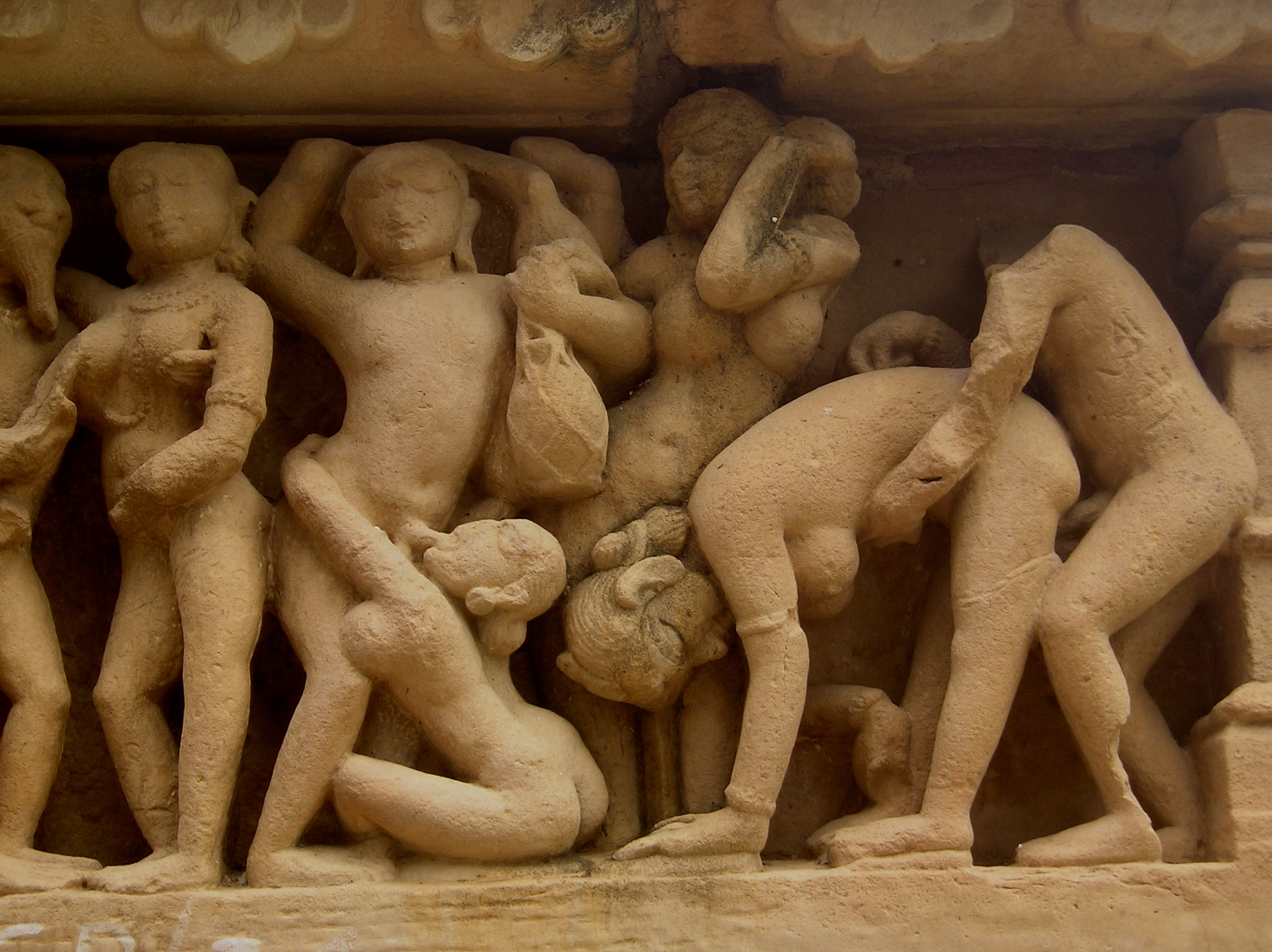
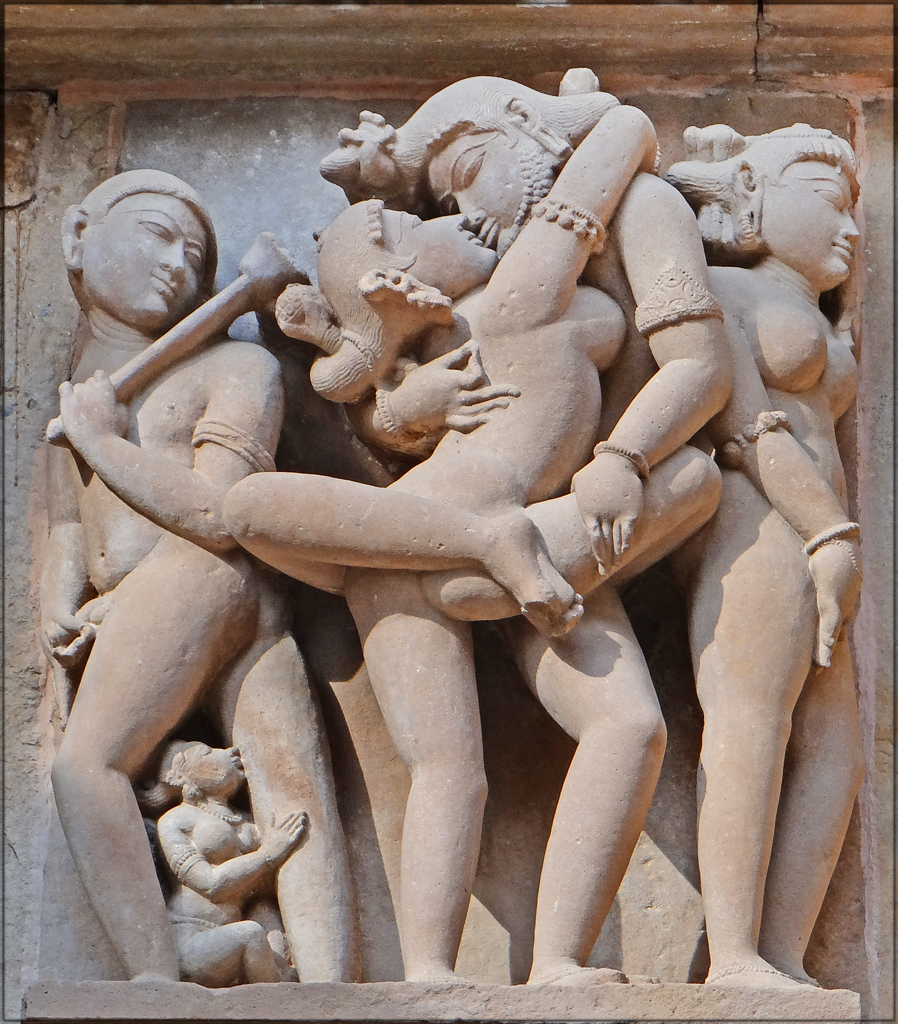
Khajuraho Hindu and Jain temple complex is famous for erotic arts.

The origins of the current Indian culture can be traced back to the Indus Valley civilisation, which was contemporaneous with the ancient Egyptian and Sumerian civilisations, around 2700 BCE. During this period, the first evidence of attitudes towards sex comes from the ancient texts of Hinduism. These ancient texts, the Rig Veda among few others, reveal moral perspectives on sexuality, marriage and fertility prayers. The epics of ancient India, the Ramayana and Mahabharata, which may have been first composed as early as 500 BCE, had a huge effect on the culture of Asia, influencing later Chinese, Japanese, Tibetan culture and South East Asian culture. These texts support the view that in ancient India, sex was considered a mutual duty between a married couple, where husband and wife pleasured each other equally, but where sex was considered a private affair, at least by followers of the aforementioned Indian religions. It seems that polygamy was allowed during ancient times. In practice, this seems to have only been practiced by rulers, with common people maintaining a monogamous marriage. It is common in many cultures for a ruling class to practice both polyandry and polygyny as a way of preserving dynastic succession.

Nudity in art was considered acceptable in southern India, as shown by the paintings at Ajanta and the sculptures of the time. It is likely that as in most countries with tropical climates, Indians from some regions did not need to wear clothes, and other than for fashion, there was no practical need to cover the upper half of the body. This is supported by historical evidence, which shows that men in many parts of ancient India mostly dressed only the lower half of their bodies with clothes and upper part of body was covered by gold and precious stones, jewellery, while women used to wear traditional sarees made of silk and expensive clothes as a symbol of their wealth.

As Indian civilisation further developed and the writing of the Upanishads around 500 BCE, it was somewhere between the 1st and 6th centuries that the Kama Sutra, originally known as Vatsyayana Kamasutram ('Vatsyayana's Aphorisms on Love'), was written. This philosophical work on kama shastra, or 'science of love', was intended as both an exploration of human desire, including infidelity, and a technical guide to pleasing a sexual partner within a marriage. This is not the only example of such a work in ancient India, but is the most widely known in modern times. It is probably during this period that the text spread to ancient China, along with Buddhist scriptures, where Chinese versions were written.

It is also during 10th century to 12th century that some of India's most famous ancient works of art were produced, often freely depicting romantic themes and situations. Examples of this include the depiction of Apsaras, roughly equivalent to nymphs or sirens in European and Arabic mythology, on some ancient temples. The best and most famous example of this can be seen at the Khajuraho complex in central India built around 9th to 12th century.

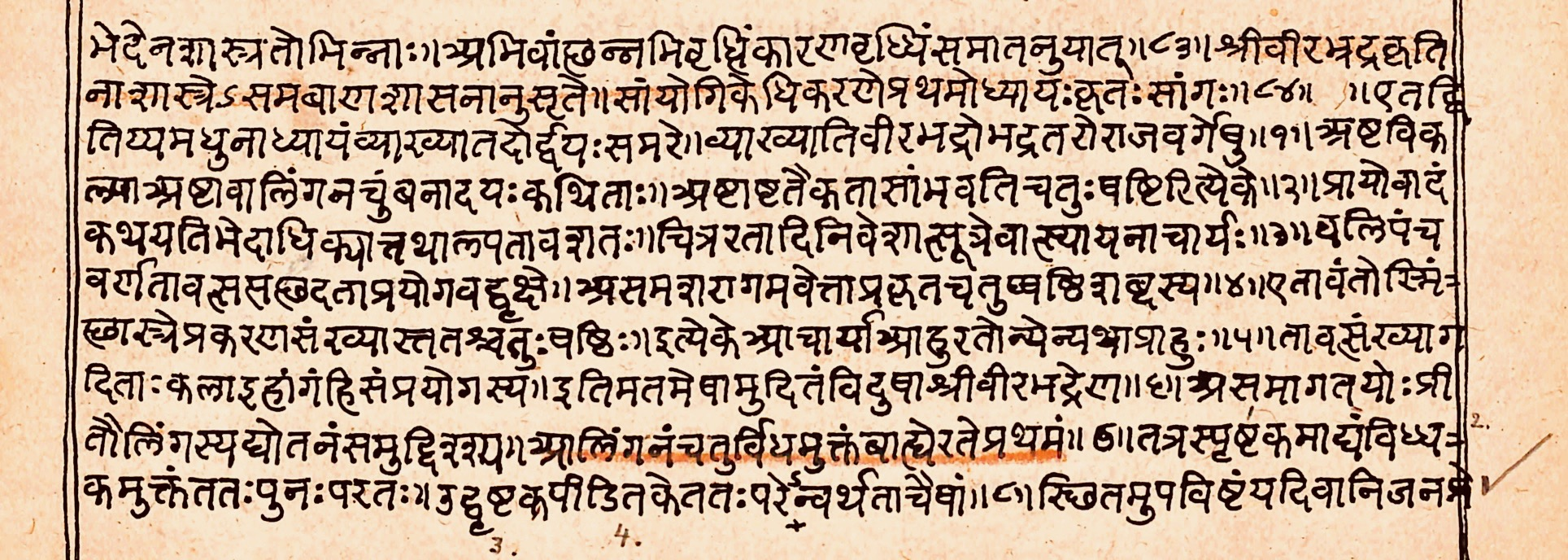
A Kamasutra manuscript page preserved in the vaults of the Raghunatha Hindu temple in Jammu and Kashmir

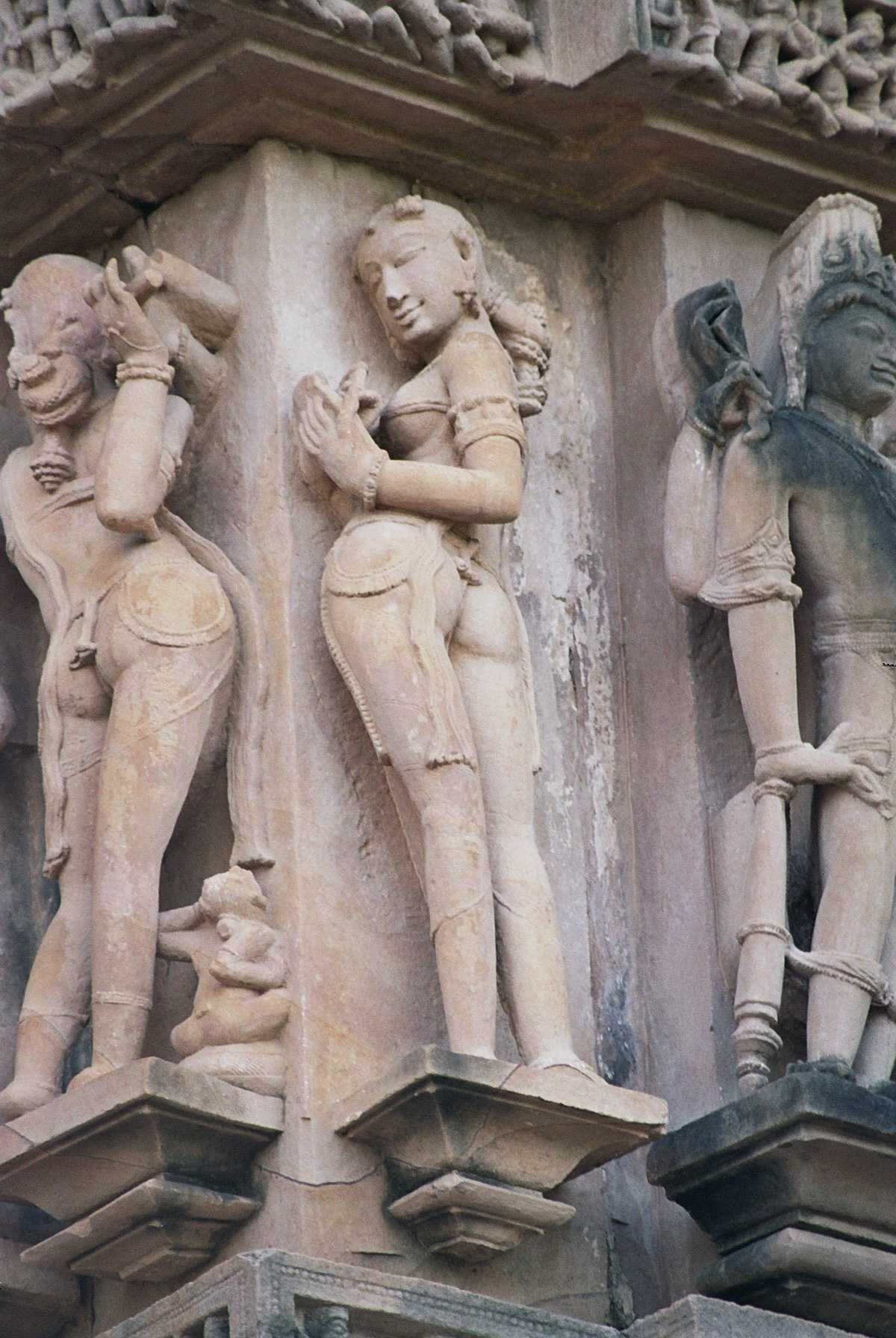
Depictions of Apsaras from the Khajuraho temple complex

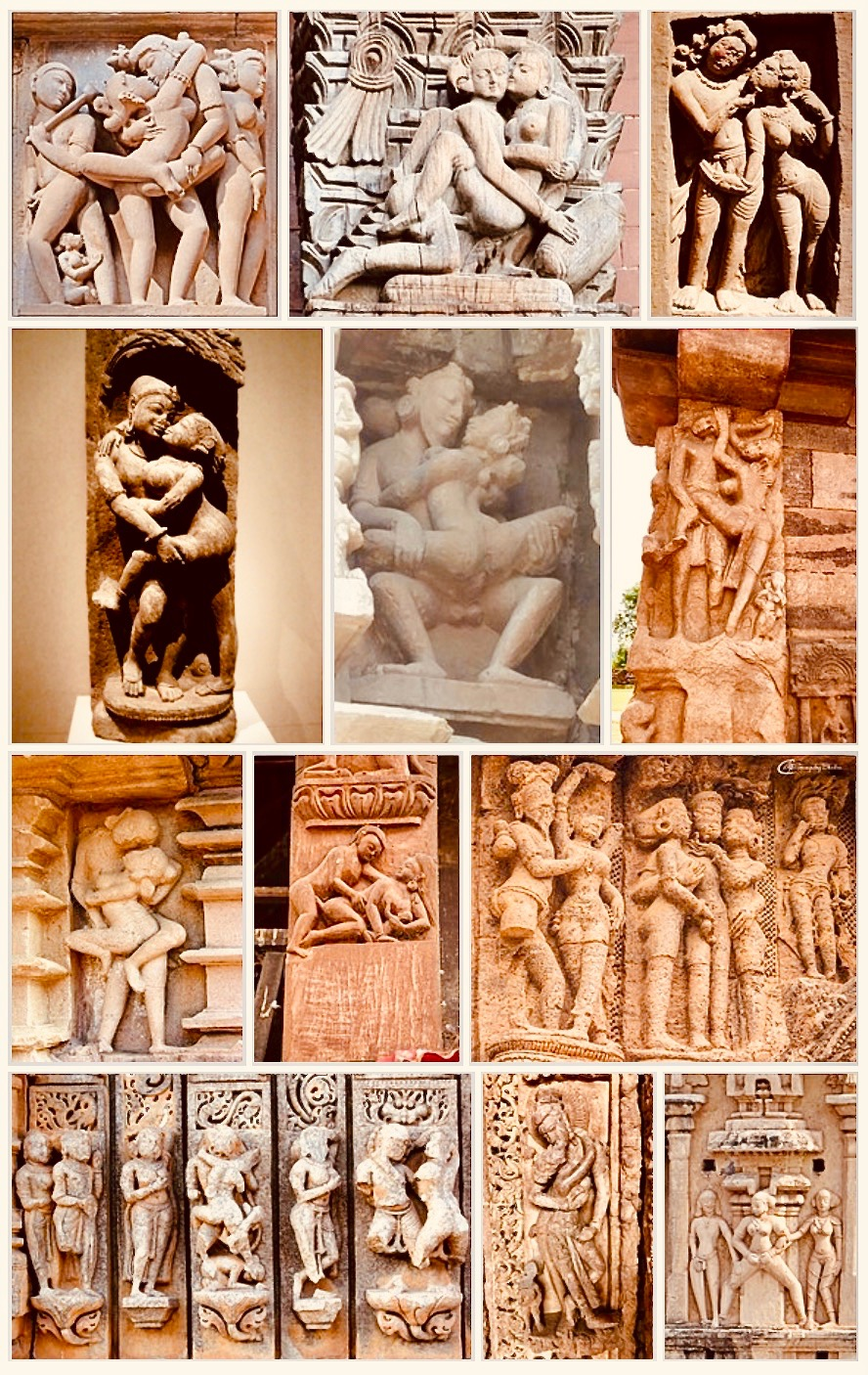
Kama-related arts are common in Hindu temples. These scenes include courtship, amorous couples in scenes of intimacy (mithuna), or a sexual position. Above: 6th- to 14th-century temples in Madhya Pradesh, Uttar Pradesh, Rajasthan, Gujarat, Karnataka, Chhattisgarh, Odisha, Tamil Nadu, Andhra Pradesh, and the Himalayas.

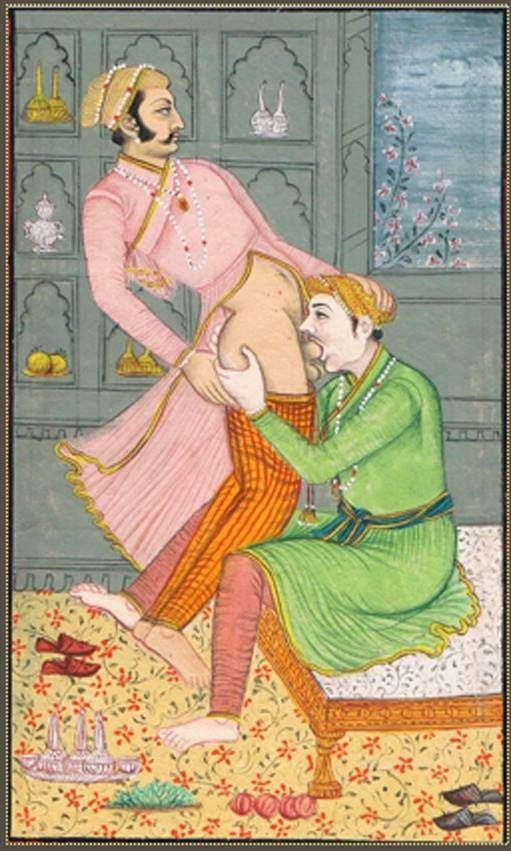
Oral sex between men, 18th century

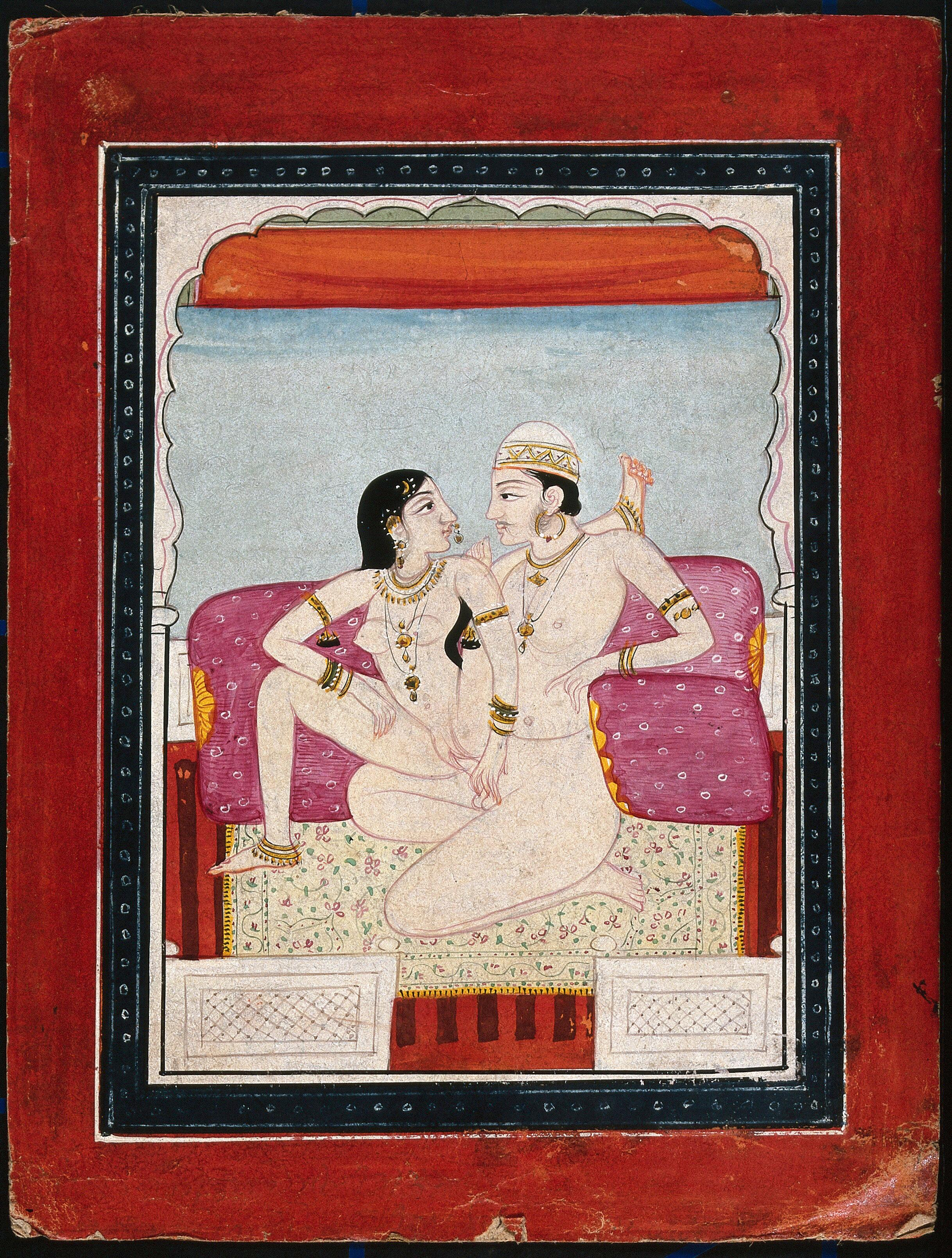
Gouache painting. Probably between 1800 and 1899.

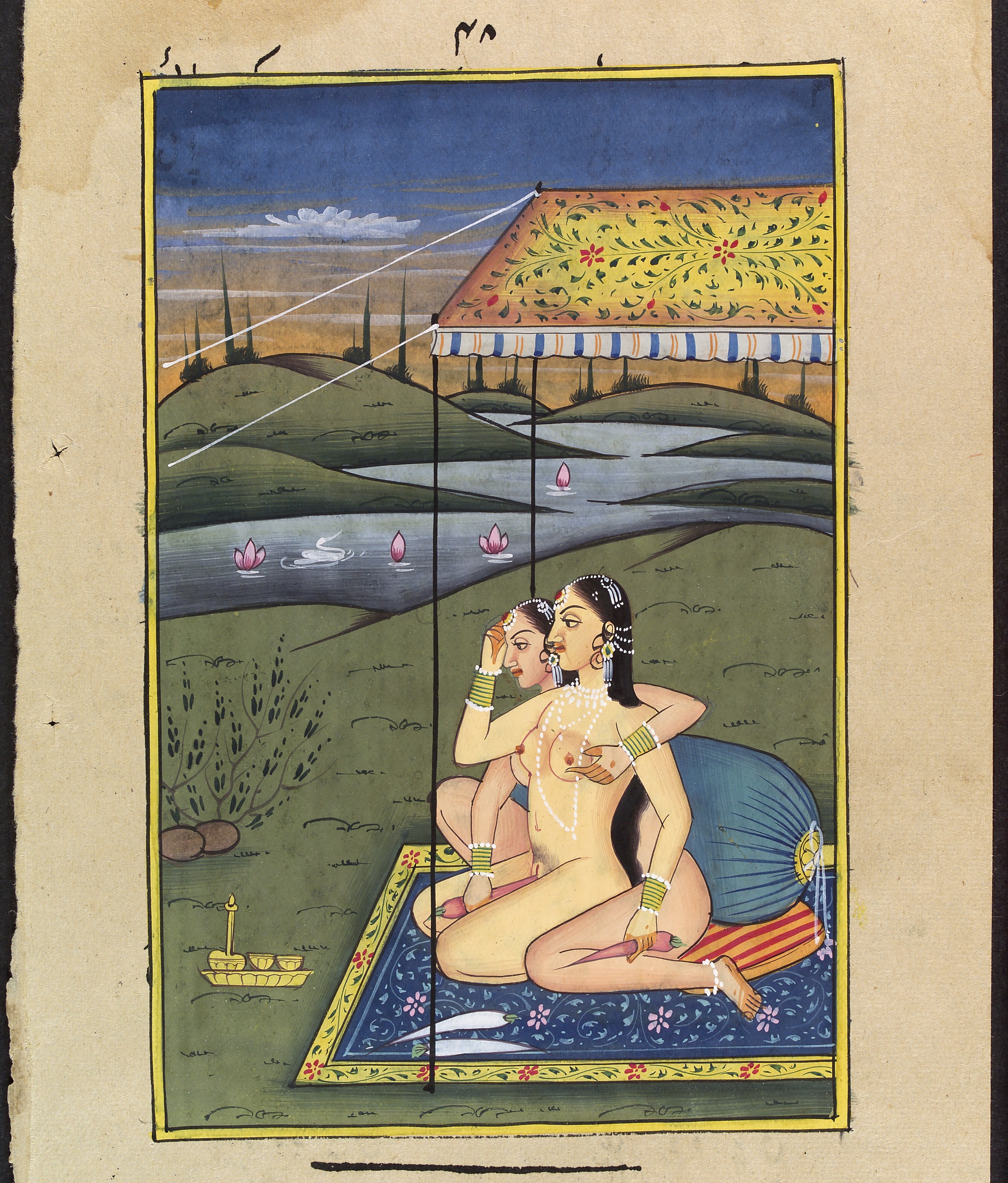
2 women using carrots as dildos, 20th century gouache painting

== Colonial-era ==
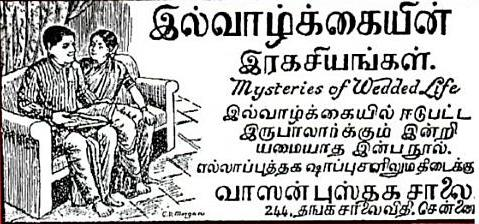
A Marriage guide published in Madras Presidency, in 1920s

British colonization of India marks a notable turning point for expressions and opinions of sexuality in India. Prior to the colonial era in India, sexuality as a concept had much more varied viewpoints and traditions surrounding it. Generally, there was acceptance of differing sexual orientations as well as gender identities. However, during the colonial era, there were significant changes to the notion of and expression of sexuality. These changes came as a result of both internal and external influences.

External influences came in the form of British colonial rule causing colonial authorities to impose Western values and ideas of sexuality on Indian society. This was not just due to British belief that their societal standards and moral beliefs were correct and consequently needed to be established in India, but rather due to the British desire to more effectively establish control as well. At the time, British society was relatively conservative when it came to sexuality in that expression of sexuality was frowned upon, female sexuality was seen as particularly problematic and needing to be controlled, and overall societal standards can be characterized as critically focused on religious and moral ideas. In addition to that, there was a general view amongst the British that Indian society was inferior and needed to be changed to fit British standards. This paved the way for policies that criminalized practices which weren't inherently sexual such as devadasi, which were religious dancers that became associated with temple prostitution during the time, or the existence of Hijra communities which were groups of intersex people, transgender people, or eunuchs who lived together and identify as a third gender. In addition, in 1861 Section 377 of the Indian Penal Code, which already criminalized hijras, was also established to prohibit homosexuality, deeming it an "unnatural offense" that was "against the order of nature." The criminalization and stigmatization of various practices such as these occurred not just due to British belief in their immorality, but also because doing so made it easier for British authorities to manage and control the public. For example, criminalizing hijra made it simpler for British officers to categorize the Indian people because classification was a key part of how Britain maintained control and governed.

However, British imposition of Victorian ideals and subsequent policies were not the only factors causing this shift in Indian sexuality. Changes in internal ideals also developed alongside British influence, creating internal factors that impacted these shifts. Most notable of these factors is regarding the concept of prostitution, and the way the term prostitute ended up being used in colonial India to describe almost all women outside of monogamous Hindu upper-caste marriages. In 1872, British authorities put out a survey in order to gain information about Indian women following the 1860 Indian Penal Code which outlawed trafficking of girls for prostitution. Through the survey, they aimed to define who prostitutes were in order to better control and manage their existence. However, responses showed that many colonial administrators—both British and Indian alike— believed basically all Indian women could be prostitutes. For example, A. H. Giles—the deputy commissioner of Calcutta's Police—argued that Indian women were more likely to partake in dangerous and illegal behavior and that as a result "the prostitute community is recruited in various ways from all classes and castes," describing the various ways women may begin engaging in prostitution such as "hereditary prostitutes [whose] mothers were prostitutes before them and they were reared into the profession from infancy" or those who "practice as prostitutes with the full knowledge and consent of their husbands...[to] drive a profitable trade." Similarly, Bengali Deputy Magistrate Bankim Chandra Chatterjee also categorized the different conditions of prostitutes, similarly claiming that while "Prostitutes in general are recruited from all classes of society and do not belong to any hereditary prostitute caste," they exist due to the sexual nature of the women themselves not being restrained.

These ideas of women and their uncontrollable sexuality that needed to be limited were in part due to the British administration's concerns that women who were not in typical monogamous upper-caste marriages were sexually deviant and therefore a threat to the order of society. However, these ideas were not solely created by the British. Upper-caste Bengali Hindus men who desired recognition as being key to the ruling of India also spread these ideas of deviant sexuality alongside idealized concepts of Hindu women for their own purposes. Through spreading these ideals, they hoped society would be restructured around these ideals and they would be able to consequently gain authority. Female sexuality was a shared target for both these men and British authorities to fault for various behaviors and then use to establish their control.

The colonial era and British policies had an immense impact on Indian sexuality—both legally and societally. The changes that occurred during this period have continued to impact various social movements and politics in India to this day.

A number of movements were set up by prominent citizens, such as the Brahmo Samaj in Bengal and the Prarthana Samaj in Bombay Presidency, to work for the 'reform' of Indian private and public life. While this new consciousness led to the promotion of education for women and (eventually) a raise in the age of consent and reluctant acceptance of remarriage for widows, it also produced a puritanical attitude to sex even within marriage and the home.

== Current issues ==
Conservative views of sexuality are now the norm in the modern republic of India, and South Asia in general. It is often argued that this is partly related to the effect of colonial influence, as well as to the puritanical elements of Islam in countries like Pakistan (e.g. the Islamic revivalist movements, which has influenced many Muslims in Pakistan and Bangladesh). However, such views were also prevalent in the pre-colonial era, especially since the advent of Islam in India which brought purdah as ideal for Muslim women. Before the gradual spread of Islam largely through the influence of Sufis, there seems to be evidence of liberal attitudes towards sexuality and nudity in art. However, scholars debate the degree to which Islam, as a mass and the varied phenomenon was responsible for this shift.

While during the 1960s and 1970s in the west, many people discovered the ancient culture of sexual liberalism in India as a source for western free love movements, and neo-Tantric philosophy, India itself is currently the more prudish culture, embodying Victorian sensibilities that were abandoned decades ago in their country of origin.

=== Modern India ===
Modern issues that affect India, as part of the sexual revolution, have become points of argument between conservative and liberal forces, such as political parties and religious pressure groups. These issues are also matters of ethical importance in a nation where freedom and equality are guaranteed in the constitution.

Scholarship by Indian sociologist Jyoti Puri calls attention to the social control around middle-class women's bodies in urban India and how politics of gender and sexuality impact of nationalist and transnational discourses and the role of nation-state. Her third book Sexual States: Governance and the Struggle Against the Antisodomy Law in India's Present, tracks the efforts to decriminalize homosexuality in India.

On 6 September 2018, the Supreme Court unanimously ruled that Section 377 is unconstitutional as it infringed on the fundamental rights of autonomy, intimacy, and identity, thus legalizing homosexuality in India.

=== Sexuality in popular entertainment ===
The entertainment industry is an important part of modern India, and is expressive of Indian society in general. Historically, Indian television and film has lacked the frank depiction of sex; until recently, even kissing scenes were considered taboo. On the other hand, rape scenes or scenes showing sexual assault were shown. Currently, some Indian states show soft-core sexual scenes and nudity in films, whilst other areas do not. Mainstream films are still largely catered to the masses.

Some recent movies like Ek Ladki Ko Dekha Toh Aisa Laga, Shubh Mangal Zyada Saavdhan, Badhaai Do help bring the concepts of alternative sexualities and LGBT inclusion in the popular culture.

=== Pornography ===
The distribution and production of pornography are both illegal in India; however, accessing pornography in private is not. Regardless, softcore films have been common since the late 1970s, and many directors have produced them. Magazine publications like Debonair (magazine), Fantasy, Chastity, Royal Magazine, and Dafa 302 exist in India, and more than 50 million Indians are believed to see porn on a daily basis.

The Information Technology Act, Chapter XI Paragraph 67, the Government of India clearly considers the transmission of pornography through any electronic medium as a punishable offence. The CEO of the Indian subsidiary of eBay was charged with various criminal offences for allowing the trading of a CD on the website that contained pornography.

=== Sex industry ===
While trade in sex was frowned upon in ancient India, it was tolerated and regulated so as to reduce the damage that it could do. However, the stigmatisation that has arisen in modern times has left the many poor sex workers with problems of exploitation and rampant sexually transmitted infection, including AIDS, and has allowed a human-trafficking industry to take hold. Thousands of Nepali women are trafficked into India, mostly from rural villages, and sold to brothels in Mumbai and Delhi. There have been some recent efforts to regulate the Indian sex industry.

A supreme court order in May 2022 upheld prostitution as a profession ruling that sex workers had the same human rights as any other citizen of India and thus they can not be discriminated or arrested for their profession.

=== Sexual health ===
Sexual dysfunction in both males and females have been reported in significant numbers in recent years. Many attribute the prevalence of sexual dysfunctions to ignorance around sexual health and conservative attitudes toward sex. Sexual education is also an area of concern for many researchers; culture-bound sexual dysfunctions such as Dhat syndrome are rooted in erroneous ideas of human physiology, which could be refuted by improved and easily accessible sexual education.

Recent studies indicate that sex education remains limited in many parts of India. A 2024 survey found that only about one-fourth of young women and one-third of young men had ever received any formal sex education.

Cultural norms often make discussions about sexuality uncomfortable, limiting open communication in households and schools. As a result, young people frequently rely on peers, social media, and informal sources, which can spread misinformation.

Studies of sexual dysfunction in India focus primarily on male sexual dysfunction. Dhat syndrome, a culture-bound psychosexual dysfunction in males is an area of study for many researchers in India. Males who experience Dhat syndrome usually come from rural areas and families with very conservative attitudes around sex. Patients with Dhat syndrome typically experience other sexual dysfunctions such as erectile dysfunction, premature ejaculation, in addition to psychiatric disorders such as depressive neurosis and anxiety neurosis. A study in 2015 showed one in five males in rural South India, and one in seven females, suffered from one or more sexual disorders. Prevalence of sexual dysfunction was two to three times higher in illiterate men than literate men in the study.

Research shows a greater prevalence of sexual dysfunction in women from higher socioeconomic classes., Women's lack of education on sex is an even greater problem in sexual health. In terms of education, knowledge around abortion is a key area of development, as unsafe abortions account for 8-9% of maternal deaths per a bulletin from the India Office of Register General. Women's agency is also heavily considered in studies of female sexual health along with the sociocultural factors such as conservative attitudes toward sex and early marriage. Much like the men experiencing Dhat syndrome, most cases of female sexual dysfunction are concentrated in rural areas and reinforced by the same social factors discussed in males.

Research shows that structured sex education programs can improve adolescents’ understanding of reproductive health, communication skills, and safer behaviors, potentially reducing early pregnancies and unsafe practices.

=== Adolescent sexuality ===
In India there is growing evidence that adolescents are becoming more sexually active. It is feared that this will lead to an increase in spread of HIV/AIDS among adolescents, increase the number of unwanted pregnancies and abortions, and give rise to conflict between contemporary social values. Adolescents have relatively poor access to health care and education. With cultural norms opposing extramarital sexual behavior, R.S. Goyal fears "these implications may acquire threatening dimensions for the society and the nation".

Motivation and frequency

Sexual relationships outside marriage are not uncommon among teenage boys and girls in India. In a random study of 100 couples, the best predictor of whether or not a girl would be having sex is if her friends were engaging in the same activities. For those girls whose friends were having a physical relationship with a boy, 84.4% were engaging in the same behavior. Only 24.8% of girls whose friends were not having a physical relationship had one themselves. In urban areas, 25.2% of girls have had intercourse and in rural areas 20.9% have. Better indicators of whether or not girls were having sex were their employment and school status. Girls who were not attending school were 14.2% (17.4% v. 31.6%) more likely to be having sex; for girls who were employed this number was 14.4% (36.0% v. 21.6%).

In the Indian sociocultural milieu girls have less access to parental love, schools, opportunities for self-development and freedom of movement than boys do. It has been argued that they may rebel against this lack of access or seek out affection through physical relationships with boys. While the data reflects trends to support this theory, it is inconclusive. The freedom to communicate with adolescent boys was restricted for girls regardless of whether they lived in an urban or rural setting, and regardless of whether they went to school or not. More urban girls than rural girls discussed sex with their friends. Those who did not may have felt "the subject of sexuality in itself is considered an 'adult issue' and a taboo or it may be that some respondents were wary of revealing such personal information."

Contraceptive use

Among Indian girls, Goyal claims that "misconceptions about sex, sexuality and sexual health were large. However, adolescents having sex relationships were somewhat better informed about the sources of spread of STDs and HIV/AIDS." While 40% of sexually active girls were aware that condoms could help prevent the spread of HIV/AIDS and reduce the likelihood of pregnancy, only 10.5% used a condom during the last time they had intercourse.

== See also ==
- History of human sexuality
- Hinduism and sexual orientation
- Homosexuality in India
- Homosexuality and Hinduism
- Homosexuality and Sikhism
- Kamashastra
- Non-westernized concepts of male sexuality
