= Legality of child pornography =

Child pornography is illegal in most countries, but there is substantial variation in definitions, categories, penalties, and interpretations of laws. Differences include the definition of "child" under the laws, which can vary with the age of sexual consent; the definition of "child pornography" itself, for example on the basis of medium or degree of reality; and which actions are criminal (e.g., production, distribution, possession, downloading or viewing of material). Laws surrounding fictional child pornography are a major source of variation between jurisdictions; some maintain distinctions in legality between real and fictive pornography depicting minors, while others regulate fictive material under general laws against child pornography.

Several organizations and treaties have set non-binding guidelines (model legislation) for countries to follow. While a country may be a signatory, they may or may not have chosen to implement these guidelines.

== International stance ==
=== Organizations ===
International Centre for Missing & Exploited Children (ICMEC)

This organization combats child sexual exploitation, child pornography, and child abduction. For child pornography they have set up "model legislation" which defines child pornography, and sets up recommended sanctions/sentencing. According to research performed in 2018; child pornography is illegal in 118 of the 196 Interpol member states. This figure represents countries that have sufficient legislation in establishing 4 or 5 of 5 criteria met as defined by the ICMEC.

ECPAT International (ECPAT)

ECPAT focuses on halting the online sexual exploitation of children, the trafficking of children for sexual purposes and the sexual exploitation of children in the travel and tourism industry. This organization tracks countries that have implemented standards as defined by agreements such as the Budapest Convention on Cybercrime, and Lanzarote Convention through their human rights reports.

=== Treaties ===
At least two major treaties are in place with one "optional protocol" to combat child pornography worldwide. These are considered international obligations to pass specific laws against child pornography which should be "punishable by appropriate penalties that take into account their grave nature". The first of these treaties has to do with The Council of Europe's Cybercrime Convention, the Council of Europe Convention on the Protection of Children against Sexual Exploitation and Sexual Abuse, and the EU Framework Decision that became active in 2006. These required signatory or member states to criminalize all aspects of child pornography. The second involves the United Nations which established Article 34 of the United Nations Convention on the Rights of the Child (UNCRC). This stated that all signatories shall take appropriate measures to prevent the exploitative use of children in pornographic performances and materials. An optional protocol was also added that requires signatories to outlaw the "producing, distributing, disseminating, importing, exporting, offering, selling or possessing for the above purposes" of child pornography. Some of the negotiations and reviews of the process took place at the World Congress against Commercial Sexual Exploitation of Children held in 1996 and 2001.

== Debate ==
While laws criminalizing child sexual abuse now exist in all countries of the world, more diversity in law and public opinion exists on issues such as the exact minimum age of those depicted in pornography, whether the mere possession of child pornography should be a crime, or the extent to which criminal law should distinguish between the possession, acquisition, distribution and production of child pornography. Convictions involving child pornography typically include prison sentences in most countries, but those sentences are often converted to probation or fines for first-time offenders in cases of mere possession.

In 1999, in the case of R. v. Sharpe, British Columbia's highest court struck down a law against possessing child pornography as unconstitutional. That opinion, written by Justice Duncan Shaw, held, "There is no evidence that demonstrates a significant increase in the danger to children caused by pornography", and "A person who is prone to act on his fantasies will likely do so irrespective of the availability of pornography." The Opposition in the Canadian Parliament considered invoking the notwithstanding clause to override the court's ruling. However, it was not necessary because the Canadian Supreme Court overturned the decision with several findings including that viewing such material makes it more likely that the viewer will abuse, that the existence of such materials further hurts the victims as they know of its existence, and that the demand for such images encourages the abuse.

In the United States, some federal judges have argued that the U.S. Sentencing Guidelines' recommended penalties for possessors of child pornography are too harsh. Judge Jack B. Weinstein of New York criticizes the mandatory sentence for possession of child pornography as often higher than the penalty for actually committing the act of child abuse it depicts. Furthermore, child pornography prosecutions have led to dozens of suicides, some of them among the innocently accused. The requirement that people convicted of possessing child pornography pay restitution has been criticized by some judges and law professors. This has been particularly controversial in cases involving millions of dollars of restitution, as in those pertaining to the Misty Series. But in 2010, the United States Court of Appeals for the Ninth Circuit ruled that restitution directly to depicted minors was an appropriate penalty for possession of child pornography.

During the nomination process at the 2008 Libertarian National Convention, anarcho-capitalist and U.S. presidential candidate Mary Ruwart came under fire for her comment in her 1998 book, Short Answers to the Tough Questions, in which she stated her opposition not only to laws against possession of child pornography but even against its production, based on her belief that such laws actually encourage such behavior by increasing prices. Shane Cory, on behalf of the minarchist United States Libertarian Party in his role as executive director, issued a response saying, "We have an obligation to protect children from sexual exploitation and abuse, and we can do this by increasing communication between state and federal agencies to help combat this repulsive industry. While privacy rights should always be respected in the pursuit of child pornographers, more needs to be done to track down and prosecute the twisted individuals who exploit innocent children." Cory resigned after the party refused to vote on a resolution asking states to strongly enforce existing child porn laws.

== Status by country ==
Table legend
Legality	Description
Illegal	Real child pornography: This tag assumes the sale, production, and distribution of child pornography is illegal (de jure) by default unless stated otherwise. Fictional child pornography: This tag assumes the sale, production, and distribution of fictional child pornography is illegal (de jure) by default unless stated otherwise. Possession: Possessing (including simple possession) is illegal (de jure) for both fictional and real child pornography by default unless stated otherwise.
Situational	Real child pornography: This may cover a partially legal situation, or one where the law is not enforced. Details can be found in the "short summary" section. Fictional child pornography: This is used when fictional child pornography is not clearly defined by law, or for countries which define what parts are legal/Illegal. Possession: If only fictional child pornography is legal, then by default possession of it is legal as well. This also covers partly legal and unenforced situations.
Legal	Real or fictional child pornography: No restrictions are in place. Possession: No restrictions are in place.
No data	The status of the law is unknown, this may change with additional sourcing.

=== Africa ===
Country (Note: This only includes sovereign states.)	Real	Fictional	Possession	Short summary
Algeria	Illegal	Illegal	Illegal	Child pornography is illegal in Algeria by any means per Article 333 bis 1 of their penal code. Punishments include prison sentences of up to 5 to 10 years with a fine of 500,000 DA to 1,000,000 DA. All forms of pornography are prohibited.
Angola	Illegal	No data	No data	Article 184 of the Angolan penal code prohibits the production, transport and sale of sexually explicit material involving a child. The law does not include simple possession or mention fictional material. Importation of pornography is prohibited.
Benin	Illegal	Illegal	Illegal	The "Child Code" of Benin prohibits child pornography including possession and simulated images. Persons convicted of child pornography face sentences of two to five years' imprisonment and fines ranging from two to five million CFA francs ($3,610 to $9,025).
Botswana	Illegal	Illegal: electronic forms	Illegal	Possession of child pornography is illegal in Botswana, and punishable with between 5 and 15 years' imprisonment. Electronic forms of an apparent child are also illegal. All forms of pornography are prohibited.
Burkina Faso	Illegal; not defined	Legal	Legal	Child pornography is illegal in Burkina Faso, but not clearly defined. Mere possession, simulated representations, or realistic images of a non-existent child are not criminalized.
Burundi	Illegal	Illegal	Illegal	Child pornography including possession is illegal in Burundi and punishable by fines and between 3 and 5 years in prison. All forms of pornography are prohibited.
Cameroon	Illegal	Illegal	Illegal	Producing, possessing, or distributing child pornography is illegal in Cameroon with punishments of 5 to 10 years of imprisonment and fines from 5 million CFA francs to 10 million CFA francs. Virtual child pornography (“realistic” images) and a person “appearing” to be a child are also punishable conducts. All forms of pornography are prohibited.
Cape Verde	Illegal	No data	Illegal	Cape Verdean law prohibits the use of children under age 18 in pornography, with penalties for conviction of up to three years' imprisonment.
Central African Republic	Illegal	Legal	Legal; fictional only	All forms of pornography involving real children are illegal.
Chad	Illegal	No data	Illegal	Article 362 of the Penal Code 2017 of Chad criminalizes the production, distribution, importation, exportation, supply, making available, sale, obtaining or handing over to others, possession of any material. All forms of pornography are prohibited.
Comoros	Illegal	No data	No data	Conviction of child pornography is punishable in Comoros by fines or imprisonment. There is no information available regarding fictional forms or mere possession. All forms of pornography are prohibited.
Democratic Republic of the Congo	Illegal	Illegal	Illegal	The Democratic Republic of the Congo's penal code prohibits child pornography by any means whatsoever. Those convicted face 10 to 20 years imprisonment. Mere possession by any means is not addressed in the law. All forms of pornography are prohibited.
Republic of Congo	Illegal	No data	Illegal	Child pornography (including possession) in the Republic of the Congo is punishable by Article 66 of the Law on the Protection of the Child of the Republic of Congo (Law No. 4-2010). All forms of pornography are prohibited.
Djibouti	Illegal	Illegal	Illegal	All forms of pornography are prohibited.
Egypt	Illegal	Illegal	Illegal	All forms of pornography are prohibited.
Equatorial Guinea	Illegal	Legal	Legal; fictional only	All forms of pornography involving real children are illegal.
Eritrea	Illegal	Illegal	Illegal	All forms of pornography are prohibited.
Eswatini	Illegal	Illegal	Illegal	Practices related to child pornography are illegal in Eswatini under the "Sexual Offences and Domestic Violence Act, 2018". Offenders face up to 25 years imprisonment. All forms of pornography are prohibited.
Ethiopia	Illegal; not defined	Illegal: electronic forms	Illegal	Child pornography is illegal (but not defined) in Ethiopia per Article 12 of the "Computer Crime Proclamation (2016)" act. There is no information given for physical forms such as drawings or paintings. All forms of pornography are prohibited.
Gabon	Illegal	Illegal	Illegal	All forms of pornography are prohibited.
The Gambia	Illegal; not defined	No data	Illegal	While child pornography is illegal in the Gambia, the law in place is "extremely under-developed". Mere possession of "child sexual abuse materials" is not criminalized. All forms of pornography are prohibited.
Ghana	Illegal	Illegal	Illegal	Child pornography is illegal in Ghana, but no clear definition is given on what “sexually explicit conduct” means leaving the law open for discretion. Virtual child pornography (“realistic” images) and a person “appearing” to be a child are also punishable conducts. All forms of pornography are prohibited.
Guinea	Illegal	Illegal, but unenforced	Illegal, but unenforced	Child pornography in any representation is illegal in Guinea under the "Criminal Code Act (1974)". The United States Department of State notes that this law is "generally unenforced". All forms of pornography are prohibited.
Guinea-Bissau	Illegal	No data	Illegal	Child pornography is illegal in Guinea-Bissau, but possession and distribution are not criminally prohibited. All forms of pornography are prohibited.
Ivory Coast	Illegal	No data	No data	The law in Ivory Coast prohibits the use, recruitment, or offering of minors for commercial sex or use in pornographic films, pictures, or events. All forms of pornography are prohibited.
Kenya	Illegal	Illegal	Illegal	All forms of pornography are prohibited.
Lesotho	Illegal	No data	No data	Child pornography is illegal in Lesotho, and is punishable by not less than 10 years' imprisonment. All forms of pornography are prohibited.
Liberia	Illegal	Illegal	Illegal	Child pornography is illegal "in any form or manner" and is punishable by up to five years' imprisonment. All forms of pornography are prohibited.
Libya	Illegal	Illegal	Illegal	All forms of pornography are prohibited.
Madagascar	Illegal	Illegal	Illegal	Article 346 of the Penal Code of Madagascar criminalizes the use of “any means” to disseminate child pornography. Officials have stated that the laws were often not uniformly interpreted or applied. All forms of pornography are prohibited.
Malawi	Illegal; not defined	Illegal	Illegal	Although laws in Malawi do not clearly define child pornography, it criminalises possession with a sanction of 14 years' imprisonment. This covers any visual depiction, including any photograph, film, video, image, whether made or produced by electronic, mechanical, or other means. All forms of pornography are prohibited.
Mali	Illegal	Illegal	No data	Child pornography is illegal in Mali per Article 228 of the 2001 adopted penal code. Penalties for conviction range from five to 20 years in prison. This law includes "pornographic pictures, films or drawings showing one or several minors aged less than thirteen". All forms of pornography are prohibited.
Mauritania	Illegal	Illegal	Illegal	All forms of pornography are prohibited.
Mauritius	Illegal	Legally unclear	Illegal	While child pornography and possession is illegal in Mauritius, its unclear whether pure fiction counts as a representation of a person. All forms of pornography are prohibited.
Morocco (including most of Western Sahara)	Illegal	Illegal	Illegal	All forms of pornography are prohibited.
Mozambique	Illegal, partly enforced	No data	Illegal, partly enforced	While partly enforced, child pornography is illegal, and all forms of pornography.
Namibia	Illegal	No data	Illegal	Production and possession of child pornography is illegal in Namibia. All forms of pornography are prohibited.
Niger	Illegal	Illegal	Illegal	All forms of pornography are prohibited.
Nigeria	Illegal	Illegal	Illegal	The Child Rights Act makes child pornography illegal in Nigeria, but not all states have implemented it. It is also criminalized by the Cybercrimes Prohibition Act of 2015. Virtual child pornography (“realistic” images) and a person “appearing” to be a child are also punishable conducts. All forms of pornography are prohibited.
Rwanda	Illegal	Illegal	No data	Child pornography is illegal in Rwanda, and convictions are punishable by life imprisonment along with a substantial monetary fine. The law also applies to "objects of sexual nature" which includes the production of writings and drawings. All forms of pornography are prohibited.
São Tomé and Príncipe	Illegal	No data	Illegal	Child pornography is illegal in São Tomé and Príncipe per article 180 of the penal code. All forms of pornography are prohibited.
Senegal	Illegal	Illegal	Illegal	All forms of pornography are prohibited.
Seychelles	Illegal	Illegal; not defined	Illegal	Producing or possessing child pornography is illegal in Seychelles, with imprisonment for conviction of up to 20 years. Fictional 'indecent' images or representations are also illegal, but these remain undefined in the law. All forms of pornography are prohibited.
Sierra Leone	Illegal	Illegal	Illegal	Child pornography is illegal in Sierra Leone ("includes other visual representation") punishable by a term of imprisonment of not more than 10 years. All forms of pornography are prohibited.
Somalia	Illegal	Illegal	Illegal	All forms of pornography are prohibited.
South Africa	Illegal	Illegal	Illegal	All forms of child pornography are illegal in South Africa. This includes possessing, creating, or importing any image or description of a person "real or simulated".
South Sudan	Illegal	Illegal	Illegal	All forms of pornography are prohibited.
Sudan	Illegal	Illegal	Illegal	All forms of pornography are prohibited.
Tanzania	Illegal	Illegal	Illegal	All forms of pornography are prohibited.
Togo	Illegal	Illegal	Illegal	Child pornography is illegal in Togo by any means whatsoever, and is punishable by 5 to 10 years in prison. All forms of pornography are prohibited.
Tunisia	Illegal	Illegal	Illegal	All forms of pornography are prohibited.
Uganda	Illegal	Illegal	Illegal	All forms of pornography are prohibited.
Zambia	Illegal	Illegal	Illegal	All forms of pornography are prohibited.
Zimbabwe	Illegal	No data	Illegal	Child pornography is illegal in Zimbabwe as anyone in possession can be charged with public indecency which is punishable by a 'small fine", imprisonment up to 6 months, or both. All forms of pornography are prohibited.
Country	Real	Fictional	Possession	Short summary

=== Americas ===
Country	Real	Fictional	Possession	Short summary
Antigua and Barbuda	Illegal	No data	No data	Child pornography is illegal in Antigua and Barbuda. Offenders are subject to fines of up to $500,000 XCD ($185,000) and 20 years in prison.
Argentina	Illegal	Legal; Not realistic by AI and based on real persons	Legal; Fictional only	Article 128 of the Argentine penal code prohibits the possession and distribution of child pornography with prison sentences between four months and one year for possession and three to six years for distribution. Fictional pornography depicting fictional minors are not addressed meanwhile fictional pornography depicting real minors, especially generated by AI, are illegal.
The Bahamas	Illegal	Illegal	Illegal	All forms of child pornography including mere possession of it are illegal in the Bahamas. Those found guilty are liable to imprisonment for life.
Barbados	Legal: film distribution only	Legal; not realistic	Legal; fictional only	The Protection of Children Act prohibits the use of children in pornographic activities, but this does not apply to distribution of films. Non-realistic representations without involvement from a real person are excluded in the law.
Belize	Illegal	Illegal	Illegal	The law in Belize prohibits the simple possession of child pornography.
Bolivia	Illegal	Legal	Legal; Fictional only	Child pornography is illegal, and is persecuted in Bolivia. Sentences are punishable by privation of freedom from 2 to 6 years. Fictional child pornography and possession thereof remains legal.
Brazil	Illegal	Legally unclear	Illegal	Production, distribution, possession, access and visualization of any sexual content involving people under 18, either real or fictional, is illegal and prosecuted in Brazil in accordance to article 241 of its "Code of Minors" (Estatuto da Criança e do Adolescente). Fictional pornography involving minors, as well as mere access or visualization of either real or fictional content, remained legal until 7 August 2026, when amendment Laws no 15.211/2025 (the 'Digital Code of Minors') and no 15.487/2026 criminalized any fictional depictions, as well as the simple access or visualization of any such content, fictional or not. Anime, manga, or animations are in a legal gray area as article 241 does not mention them and was made specifically to target AI deepfakes, even though if taken literally the law refers to any fictional depiction whatsoever. The original law referred to scenes of explicit sex involving children or teenagers (defined as people aged below 12 and between 12 and 17 respectively). In 2003, it was amended to include any pornographic depiction. The Brazilian judiciary later ruled that any sexual content, even without explicit nudity, is to be included under this law. Punishments range from 4 to 10 years of imprisonment and can increased by one third (up to 5 years and 4 months to 13 years and 4 months) if done on internet.
Canada	Illegal	Illegal	Illegal	Section 163.1 of the Criminal Code of Canada, enacted on June 25, 1993, forbids the production, distribution, and possession of both real and fictional child pornography, including material in the form of writing, fictional visual representations, and audiovisual recordings. Maximum punishments vary from ten to fourteen years in prison depending on the type of offense.
Chile	Illegal	Illegal	Illegal	Possession of child pornography real or faked, or any representation of their genitalia with the purpose of sexual gratification is illegal under Chilean law. Sentences are punishable from 541 days to 5 years imprisonment depending on the situation.
Colombia	Illegal, subject to conditions	Legal	Illegal, subject to conditions	Real child pornography is illegal and is prosecuted in Colombia. However, the Supreme Court of Justice has clarified that the voluntary creation of sexually explicit photographs by an adolescent over the age of 14 and under the age of 18 does not, in and of itself, automatically constitute the crime of child pornography. Rather, whether the conduct meets the legal elements of the offense must be determined based on the specific circumstances of the case, particularly the existence of consent and whether deception, coercion, or a context of exploitation is involved. The Court also ruled in 2018 that "artificial child pornography" is not a crime. This applies to non nude photographs, drawings, animation, and situations that do not involve actual abuse.
Costa Rica	Illegal	Illegal	Illegal	All forms of child pornography, including its possession, are illegal in Costa Rica. Defendants found guilty of selling, financing, distributing or exhibiting child pornography will serve convictions of four to eight years.
Cuba	Illegal	No data	Legal	Child pornography is illegal in Cuba, and the law imposes seven- to 15-years' imprisonment. Mere possession of child pornography is not criminalized.
Dominica	Legal	Legal	Legal	There are no laws in Dominica that prohibit child pornography.
Dominican Republic	Illegal	Illegal	Illegal: electronic form	Laws in the Dominican Republic contain specific provisions that prohibit child pornography. Possession is only illegal in electronic form.
El Salvador	Illegal, but unenforced	Legal	Legal; Fictional only	El Salvador's penal Code prohibits child pornography involving real children. This remains unenforced due to inadequate training and resources.
Ecuador	Illegal	Illegal	Illegal	The possession, storing, fabrication or distribution of child pornography or any other kind of sexually explicit pedophile material is illegal under Ecuadorian law.
Grenada	Illegal: electronic forms	Legal; complex situation (Note: Electronic forms of child pornography are legal if "the publication of which is proved to be justified as being for the public good on the ground that such book, pamphlet, paper, writing drawing, painting representation or figure is the interest of science, literature, art or learning or other objects of general concern". The other exemption for this covers "bona fide heritage or religious purposes".)	Illegal: electronic forms	Electronic forms of child pornography are illegal in Grenada under the Electronic Crimes Act. Psychical forms and possession of them are not mentioned.
Guatemala	Illegal; production	Illegal	Legal	Production of child pornography is illegal in Guatemala. Non-realistic images of child pornography are also criminalized, but possession remains legal.
Guyana	Legal, restricted by regulations	Legal	Legal	There are no laws in Guyana that specifically prohibit child pornography. The sale, publishing, or exhibiting of obscene material, defined as anything that could deprive or corrupt those open to immoral influences is instead subject to regulations.
Haiti	Illegal, but unenforced	Legal	Legal	Haitian law prohibits child pornography, but there are no mechanisms established for enforcement. There are also no provisions on the production, possession, and dissemination of child pornography.
Honduras	Illegal	Legal	Legal; Fictional only	Pornography involving real children is illegal in Honduras. Penalties range from 4 to 15 years imprisonment from possession to distribution, production, etc.
Jamaica	Illegal	Illegal	Illegal	The production, possession, importation, exportation, and distribution of child pornography is illegal in Jamaica and is punishable by a maximum penalty of 23 years in prison and a fine of J$500,000.
Mexico	Illegal	Illegal	Illegal	All forms of child pornography are illegal in Mexico with prison sentences ranging from six months to 12 years depending on the felon's age.
Nicaragua	Illegal	Illegal	No data	All forms of child pornography are illegal in Nicaragua, including fictional drawings. The government generally enforces the law with prison sentences ranging from 10 to 15 years.
Panama	Illegal	Illegal	Illegal	All forms of child pornography including possession are illegal in Panama.
Paraguay	Illegal	Legal	Legal; Fictional only	Child pornography involving actual children is illegal in Paraguay. Virtual forms were not included in the "Paraguayan Criminal Code" of 1997.
Peru	Illegal	Legal	Legal; Fictional only	Child pornography is illegal in Peru under article 183-A of the penal code except for fictional material that does not depict a real child.
Saint Kitts and Nevis	Illegal: electronic forms	Legally unclear; not realistic	Illegal; electronic forms	The criminal code makes publishing, producing, or possessing child pornography through an electronic device a crime. There is no information given on psychical forms, unrealistic images, and possession of them.
Saint Lucia	Legal	Legal	Legal	There are no laws in Saint Lucia that define or specifically prohibit child pornography.
Suriname	Illegal	No data	Illegal	Child pornography is prohibited in Suriname. Convictions carry a maximum penalty of six years' imprisonment and maximum fine of SRD 50,000 ($6,650).
Trinidad and Tobago	Illegal	No data	Illegal	Child pornography and possession of it is illegal in Trinidad and Tobago. Offenders are liable on conviction on indictment, to a fine of thirty thousand dollars and to imprisonment for ten years.
United States (including all territories)	Illegal	Legal; not "obscene"; Not realistic by AI and based on real persons; complex situation	Legal; fictional only	The U.S. laws against child pornography are virtually always enforced and among the harshest in the world such as the NCMEC. "Fictional child pornography" is legally protected as freedom of expression under the First Amendment of the United States Constitution, unless it is considered obscene. (Note: The definition of "obscene" is determined by a sitting judge or jury. See Legal status of fictional pornography depicting minors in the United States and United States v. Handley.) Despite it, there were bypass to prosecute fictional content under different laws such as PROTECT Act and is punishable by up to 15 years of imprisonment.
Uruguay	Illegal	Illegal	Illegal	All forms of child pornography are illegal.
Venezuela	Illegal	Legal	Legal	Venezuela does not prohibit the simple possession of child pornography. However, sale and distribution of child pornography is illegal and punished by fines or imprisonment from three months to four years. There are no laws that criminalize fictional forms.
Country	Real	Fictional	Possession	Short summary

=== Asia ===
Country	Real	Fictional	Possession	Short summary
Afghanistan	No data	No data	No data	Child pornography was illegal in Afghanistan under the Afghan penal code: “[i]f an adult male has intercourse with a person younger than the legal age, his act shall be considered rape and the victim's consent is invalid.” This law also applied to women offenders who may have been additionally charged with adultery. Following Fall of Kabul and subsequent takeover of power by the Taliban in 2021, the legal status of child pornography is unclear but all forms of pornography are prohibited and its distribution and production are punishable by death.
Azerbaijan	Illegal	Illegal	Legally unclear	All forms of pornography are illegal in Azerbaijan, but laws regarding simple possession are not stated.
Bahrain	Illegal	Illegal	Illegal	All forms of pornography are prohibited in Bahrain, including fictional drawings.
Bangladesh	Illegal	Legal	Legally unclear: fictional	Child pornography is illegal in Bangladesh except for virtual forms which are not addressed. Penalty will be 10 years in prison with labour and up to 500,000 BDT fines.
Bhutan	Illegal	Legally unclear	No data	All forms of pornography are prohibited as it falls under "obscene material". Virtual child pornography, and mere possession are not addressed.
Brunei	Illegal	Illegal	Illegal	All forms of pornography are prohibited.
Cambodia	Illegal	Illegal	Illegal	All forms of pornography are prohibited in Cambodia, which includes photographs and drawings.
China (including Hong Kong and Macau)	Illegal	Illegal	Illegal	All forms of pornography are prohibited with the exceptions of Hong Kong and Macau, which only make child pornography illegal.
Cyprus	Illegal	No data	Illegal	Child pornography is illegal in Cyprus with a maximum sentence of up to life in prison. Cyprus has one of the harshest penalties in the world, and it's virtually always enforced.
India	Illegal	Legal, art only	Legal, art only	All forms of pornography except fictional depictions "in the interest of art or literature" are prohibited.
Indonesia	Illegal	Illegal	Illegal	All forms of pornography are prohibited in Indonesia. This law makes no exception for fictional depictions and possession.
Iran	Illegal	Illegal	Illegal	All forms of pornography are prohibited and are punishable by death under 'corruption of earth'.
Iraq	Illegal	Illegal	Illegal	All forms of pornography are prohibited.
Israel (excluding Palestinian territories)	Illegal	Illegal	Illegal	All forms of child pornography are illegal in Israel. This includes possession and fictional depictions. Palestine has no data.
Japan	Illegal	Legal; genitals censored	Legal; fictional only	Simple possession, production, and distribution of child pornography is illegal in Japan. Penalty will be 5 years in prison and/or a fine of ¥5,000,000 (approximately $31,200 USD as of April 2026). Possession of child pornography is banned by since 2014 and is punishable by less than 1 year in prison and/or a fine of ¥1,000,000. Fictional child pornography, such as lolicon and shotacon, even if realistic, is excluded from the law. falling under "cultural and artistic activities", which are protected by freedom of expression. However, the genitals must be censored or pixelated according to Article 175 of Japanese Penal Code (this applies to all kinds of pornography, including real adult pornography). Recently, Japan has been pressured to criminalise fictional child pornography by international organisations such as the UN and G7, but refused after protests from artists, publishers and some Japanese lawmakers.
Jordan	Legal; restricted online	Legally unclear	Legal	Child pornography is not explicitly defined nor criminalized in the Jordanian legislation, but there are online laws in place which criminalize dissemination.
Kazakhstan	Illegal	No data	Legal	Child pornography is illegal in Kazakhstan except for mere possession. The law also provides administrative penalties to cover the sale of pornographic materials to minors.
North Korea	Illegal	Illegal	Illegal	All forms of pornography are prohibited and are punishable by death if foreign involved.
South Korea	Illegal	Illegal	Illegal	All forms of pornography (real or fictional) are prohibited. These actively enforced laws also allow government monitoring and censorship, possession of any form (child or not) is also illegal. Penalty for child pornography will be 10 years in prison.
Kuwait	Illegal	Illegal	Illegal	All forms of pornography are prohibited.
Kyrgyzstan	Illegal; not defined	Legally unclear	Legal; some restrictions	While child pornography is illegal in Kyrgyzstan, there is no legislation that defines child pornography by law. Computer related activities such as access to child pornography online, and mere possession are not fully criminalized.
Laos	Illegal	Legally unclear	Legal	Laws in Laos prohibit the dissemination of pornography, giving it a broad definition that could be interpreted to include simulated representations of children. Simple possession is not criminalized.
Lebanon	Illegal	Illegal	No data	The Penal Code and Law 422 protect children from child pornography which include the artificial practice of simulating sexual activities or virtual portrayals.
Malaysia	Illegal	Illegal	Illegal	All forms of pornography are prohibited. Offenses related to child pornography in Malaysia was loosely defined in the Penal Code, before being restricted in detail with the inclusion of Sexual Offences Against Children Act 2017 (first amended in 2023).
Maldives	Illegal	Legally unclear	Illegal	All forms of pornography are prohibited in Maldives under Islamic law (Sharia). The law makes no definition of fictional forms.
Mongolia	Illegal; not defined	Legally unclear	No data	While all forms of pornography are prohibited, there are no specific provisions focused on child pornography. Legal penalties depend on the interpretation of other related laws.
Myanmar	Illegal	No data	No data	All forms of pornography are prohibited. It is unknown if the law covers simple possession or fictional forms.
Nepal	Illegal	Legal	Legally unclear; real	Nepalese law prohibits taking or allowing to be taken any photograph of children for the purpose of engaging a child in immoral profession. Virtual child pornography is not criminalized under Nepalese law, while mere possession under "real" is not mentioned.
Oman	Illegal	Illegal	Illegal	All forms of pornography are prohibited.
Pakistan	Illegal	Illegal	Illegal	All forms of pornography (adult and child) are prohibited. Child pornography is punishable with 20 years in prison and a fine of 1 million rupees.
Philippines	Illegal	Illegal	Illegal	The 2009 "Anti-Child Pornography Act" made child pornography illegal in the Philippines in all forms. In 2022, the statute was expressly repealed and superseded by the newer Republic Act No. 11930, which expanded the scope of prohibited offenses.
Qatar	Illegal	Illegal	Illegal	All forms of pornography are prohibited.
Saudi Arabia	Illegal	Illegal	Illegal	All forms of pornography are prohibited.
Singapore	Illegal	Illegal	Illegal	All forms of pornography are prohibited. ICMEC Singapore has a voluntary Asia-Pacific Financial Coalition Against Child Pornography (APAC-FCACP) to fight online child sexual exploitation.
Sri Lanka	Illegal; not defined	Legally unclear	Illegal	Although all forms of pornography are prohibited, child pornography is not defined and not always enforced by authorities. "Fictional" child pornography such as drawings and cartoons are also covered but face the same undefined issue.
Syria	Illegal, possibly unenforced	No data	Illegal, possibly unenforced	Syrian law considers child pornography a trafficking crime, but the punishment for child pornography is set at the local level with unclear enforcement, often due to Syrian civil war.
Taiwan	Illegal	Legal; Not realistic by AI or based on real persons	Legal; fictional only	The "Child and Youth Sexual Exploitation Prevention Act" criminalizes the production, broadcast, distribution, and exhibition of pornography. Simple possession of such materials without justifiable cause is punishable by fines. Fictional child pornography, with the exception of creations depicting real people or realistic images generated by AI, are excluded from the "Child and Youth Sexual Exploitation Prevention Act".
Tajikistan	Illegal	Legal	Legal; fictional only	Child pornography is illegal in Tajikistan, except for possession which is not mentioned by law. Virtual child pornography, and suggestive representations of children are not defined.
Thailand	Illegal	Legally unclear	Illegal	Child pornography including possession is illegal in Thailand, as is pornography in general. According to ECPAT though, the law does not reflect the definition of virtual “child pornography” set forth in international legal instruments. Penalty will be 5 years or 10 years in prison.
East Timor	Illegal	Illegal	Illegal	All forms of child pornography including possession of it is illegal in East Timor. Convictions are punishable with 3 to 10 years imprisonment.
Turkey	Illegal	Illegal	Illegal	Child pornography and possession is illegal in Turkey with imprisonment of 2 to 5 years and a fine for violations. Fictional child pornography has been illegal since 2016.
Turkmenistan	Illegal; not defined	Legally unclear	No data	While there are no specific child pornography laws in Turkmenistan, legislation states that the production and dissemination of (child) pornographic printed publications, films or any pornographic items shall be prohibited.
United Arab Emirates	Illegal	Illegal	Illegal	Child pornography is illegal, and all forms of pornography.
Uzbekistan	Illegal	No data	Legal	Although the production and distribution of child pornography are criminally prohibited, possession is not criminalized in Uzbekistan.
Vietnam	Illegal; not defined	Legally unclear	No data	Child pornography is illegal, but not defined under Vietnamese law. The production, distribution, dissemination, and sale of material deemed to be child pornography is punishable by 3 to 10 years in prison. Virtual "child pornography" is not defined or explicitly criminalized.
Yemen	Illegal, but unenforced	No data	No data	The legal framework in Yemen does not adequately prohibit child pornography. This country has been hampered by an ongoing civil war since 2014, and the extent of Sharia law implementation is unclear.
Country	Real	Fictional	Possession	Short summary

=== Europe ===
Country	Real	Fictional	Possession	Short summary
Albania	Illegal	Legal	Legal; fictional only	The production and distribution of child pornography is illegal in Albania, and is punishable by a prison sentence of three to 10 years. While the possession of "real" child pornography is illegal, there are no provisions for fictional forms.
Andorra	Illegal	Illegal	Illegal	All forms of child pornography (real or fictional) including ownership are illegal in Andorra. Prison sentences range from one to four years depending on the severity of the crime committed.
Armenia	Illegal	No data	No data	Child pornography is illegal in Armenia and punishable by up to 7 years in prison.
Austria	Illegal, subject to conditions	Legal; not realistic	Illegal, subject to conditions	Child pornography is illegal in Austria except for unrealistic depictions. Penalty will be 10 years in prison. Photorealistic (lit. "close to reality") forms are prohibited, and are treated as regular child pornography. Section 207a(5)–(6) of the Austrian Criminal Code exempts certain images or depictions of consenting persons aged 14–17 when created or possessed for personal use. All forms of child pornography even with fictional and possession could be criminalised on online with virtually enforced if EU's Chat Control is adopted.
Belarus	Illegal	Legal	Legal	Producing and distributing pornographic materials depicting a minor is illegal in Belarus, and punishable by up to 13 years in prison. The law does not criminalize simple possession or virtual forms of "child pornography". All forms of pornography are prohibited.
Belgium	Illegal	Legal; not realistic	Legal; fictional only	Possession of, producing, and disseminating child pornography is illegal in Belgium. Penalty will be 15 years in prison. While fictional child pornography is legal, the law applies to pornographic art that realistically depicts underage characters. All forms of child pornography even with fictional and possession could be criminalised on online with virtually enforced if EU's Chat Control is adopted.
Bosnia and Herzegovina	Illegal	Illegal	Illegal	The Criminal Codes of FBiH, RS, and BD prohibit the production, possession, and distribution of child pornography. These laws also apply to a person who "looks like a child" in real or explicitly simulated evident sexual behaviour.
Bulgaria	Illegal	Legal	Legal; fictional only	Child pornography and possession is illegal in Bulgaria. Penalty will be 1 year in prison or a fine of up to 2,000 leva Fictional forms such as "realistic images" or "virtual" representations are not included nor criminalized. All forms of child pornography even with fictional and possession could be criminalised on online with virtually enforced if EU's Chat Control is adopted.
Croatia	Illegal	Legal; artwork only	Legal; Artwork only	Child pornography is illegal in Croatia with laws actively enforced. Penalty will be 10 years in prison. Fictional forms are only allowed if they are considered to be "artistic, medical, scientific, and informative" content. All forms of child pornography even with fictional and possession could be criminalised on online with virtually enforced if EU's Chat Control is adopted.
Czech Republic	Illegal	No data	Illegal	Child pornography and possession is illegal in the Czech Republic with laws that are actively enforced. Penalty will be 8 years in prison. There is no information regarding the implementation of fictional child pornography laws. All forms of child pornography even with fictional and possession could be criminalised on online with virtually enforced if EU's Chat Control is adopted.
Denmark (including all territories)	Illegal	Legal	Legal; fictional only	Possession, distribution, and production of child pornography is illegal under Danish law. Penalties for the distribution of child pornography include up to a six-year prison sentence. Fictional forms are legal as there are no laws in Denmark which prohibit "pornographic" drawings of children. All forms of child pornography even with fictional and possession could be criminalised on online with virtually enforced if EU's Chat Control is adopted.
Estonia	Illegal	Illegal	Illegal	Child pornography is illegal in Estonia with punishments ranging from a fine to three years in prison. While fictional forms are also illegal per article 178 of the Penal Code, this law does not apply to Estonian citizens who legally commit the offense abroad. All forms of child pornography even with fictional and possession could be criminalised on online with virtually enforced if EU's Chat Control is adopted.
Finland (including Åland)	Illegal	Legal; not realistic	Legal; fictional only	Under Finnish law, it is illegal to possess, produce or distribute child pornography. Penalty will be 2 years in prison or fines and 6 years in prison for "Aggravated". If there is no child (defined as a real person) in child pornography, then it is legal depending on realism. All forms of child pornography even with fictional and possession could be criminalised on online with virtually enforced if EU's Chat Control is adopted.
France (including all territories)	Illegal	Legal; Artwork only	Legal; Artwork only	Child pornography is illegal in France, with a maximum penalty of 7 years in prison and a €100,000 fine for its use and distribution. Fictional forms are also covered in the law except for works which are deemed artistic in value. All forms of child pornography even with fictional and possession could be criminalised on online with virtually enforced if EU's Chat Control is adopted.
Georgia	Illegal	Illegal	Illegal	All forms of child pornography including possession are illegal in Georgia, and punishable by up to five years' imprisonment.
Germany	Illegal, subject to conditions	Legal; not realistic	Illegal, subject to conditions	Distributing, acquiring, and possessing child pornography is illegal in Germany with punishments from three months to 10 years imprisonment. Section 184c(4) StGB exempts the production and possession of youth pornographic material when it is created with the consent of the persons depicted and exclusively for their personal use, but does not exempt its distribution. Acquisition and possession of fictional "child pornography" is legal as long as it does not appear to be real. All forms of child pornography, even fictional, could be criminalised online if the EU's Chat Control is adopted, which Germany is likely to oppose in 2025.
Greece	Illegal	Illegal	Illegal	All forms of child pornography are illegal in Greece. Article 348A of the Greek criminal code punishes offenders with imprisonment of at least one year and a fine of €10,000 to €100,000. All forms of child pornography even with fictional and possession could be criminalised on online with virtually enforced if EU's Chat Control is adopted.
Hungary	Illegal	Legal; not realistic	Legal; fictional only	Child pornography and possession is illegal in Hungary per "Act C" of the 2012 criminal code. Hungarian law defines "child pornography" as "any video, movie or photograph or other form of recording". This law does not include capturing a child (under 18) by drawing or painting as long as the content is non "realistic". The penalty has strengthened since July 2021 over Anti LGBTQ law 2021. All forms of child pornography even with fictional and possession could be criminalised on online with virtually enforced if EU's Chat Control is adopted.
Iceland	Illegal	Illegal	Illegal	All forms of pornography (adult and child) are prohibited.
Ireland	Illegal	Illegal	Illegal	All forms of child pornography and possession are illegal in Ireland and punishment of up to 14 years imprisonment. This includes 'pornography" that doesn't contain any "real children". All forms of child pornography even with fictional and possession could be criminalised on online with virtually enforced if EU's Chat Control is adopted.
Italy	Illegal	Legally unclear	Illegal	Child pornography and possession is illegal in Italy per Article 600 of the Italian criminal code. All forms of child pornography even with fictional and possession could be criminalised on online with virtually enforced if EU's Chat Control is adopted.
Latvia	Illegal	Legal; Artwork only	Legal; Artwork only	All forms of child pornography are prohibited in Latvia except for works that are educational, informative, scientific, or artistic in value. All forms of child pornography even with fictional and possession could be criminalised on online with virtually enforced if EU's Chat Control is adopted.
Liechtenstein	Illegal	Illegal	Illegal	Possession or distribution of child pornography is a criminal offense, with penalties of up to three years in prison. The legal definition of "pornographic depictions of minors" makes no distinction between real or fictional pornography.
Lithuania	Illegal	Illegal	Illegal	Child pornography and possession is illegal in Lithuania per Articles 162 and 309 of the Lithuanian criminal code. The law includes material "displaying a child or presenting a person as a child", with punishments of up to 3 years imprisonment. All forms of child pornography even with fictional and possession could be criminalised on online with virtually enforced if EU's Chat Control is adopted.
Luxembourg	Illegal; not defined	No data	Illegal	Child pornography (including possession) is illegal in Luxembourg. An ongoing issue is that there is no clear definition for "child pornography" as highly sexualised pictures of children are sometimes considered perfectly legal. The law does not mention fictional forms leaving no data available. All forms of child pornography even with fictional and possession could be criminalised on online with virtually enforced if EU's Chat Control is adopted.
Malta	Illegal	Illegal	Illegal	Child pornography and possession is illegal in Malta with punishments ranging from 3 to 12 years imprisonment depending on the action involved. This law also includes simulated images in the form of drawings and cartoons under Malta's criminal code. All forms of child pornography even with fictional and possession could be criminalised on online with virtually enforced if EU's Chat Control is adopted.
Moldova	Illegal	Illegal	Illegal	Child pornography, in both real or fictional forms is illegal in Moldova according to article 208.1 of the penal code, with punishments ranging from 1 to 3 years imprisonment.
Monaco	Illegal	Legally unclear; not realistic	Legally unclear: fictional	Child pornography and possession is illegal in Monaco per Article 294-3 of the Monacan criminal code. The law also includes falsified "realistic" images of a physical person that was fully or partially created using digital technology. No information is given for other possible real or unrealistic forms.
Montenegro	Illegal; not defined	Legally unclear	Legally unclear: fictional	Article 211 of the Criminal Code criminalises “pornographic” content and performances but does not define the term “pornographic” or what is considered to be “child pornography”. Fictional forms are not defined or criminalized, but a provision under Article 211 could cover them.
Netherlands (including all territories)	Illegal	Legally unclear; not realistic	Legally unclear: fictional	Child pornography and possession is illegal in the Netherlands per Article 240b of the criminal code. Penalty will be 6 years in prison or a fine of €82,000. The law also includes "realistic" images which are in a legal grey area, as judgements are made that vary from image to image. All forms of child pornography even with fictional and possession could be criminalised on online with virtually enforced if EU's Chat Control is adopted.
North Macedonia	Illegal	Legally unclear; not realistic	Legally unclear: fictional	Child pornography and possession is illegal in North Macedonia per Article 193 (plus a and b) of the criminal code. The law also covers "realistic pictures" without providing a definition.
Norway (including all territories)	Illegal	Legally unclear	Illegal	Child pornography and possession is illegal in Norway per Section 311 of the penal code. This is defined as any depiction of sexual abuse of children, or any content that sexualises children. "Children" is defined as "persons who are or appear to be under 18 years of age". The law makes an exception for works deemed to be artistic, scientific or informational, as well as cases involving 16 and 17 year olds "if this person consented and the two are approximately equal in age and development".
Poland	Illegal; not defined	Legally unclear	Legally unclear: fictional	Child pornography (including possession) is illegal in Poland, but legislation does not define the concept of "child pornography". Penalty will be 10 years in prison. Fictional forms are in a legal gray area as they could arguably fall under Section 4b of article 202 of the penal code. All forms of child pornography even with fictional and possession could be criminalised on online with virtually enforced if EU's Chat Control is adopted but the Poland is likely to oppose in 2025.
Portugal (including all territories)	Illegal	Legally unclear	Legally unclear: fictional	Child pornography and possession is illegal in Portugal under Article 176 of the Portuguese penal code. Penalty will be 1-5 in prison. The law is also vague in its definition of "pornographic depictions" when mentioning "realistic representations of children". (Note: "Realistic representations of children includes "virtual child pornography".) All forms of child pornography even with fictional and possession could be criminalised on online with virtually enforced if EU's Chat Control is adopted.
Romania	Illegal	Legally unclear; unrealistic	Legally unclear: fictional	Art. 374 of the Romanian Penal Code defines "Child pornography material" as any material “presenting a minor having explicit sexual behaviour or an adult who is presented as a minor having explicit sexual behaviour or images that, although not presenting a real person, simulate, credibly, a minor having that kind of behaviour and any representation of children sexual organs with the intent of depicting sexual behaviour. Penalty will be 1 to 5 years in prison.” It's unclear if images that present unrealistic fictional characters are also considered images that simulate minors. All forms of child pornography even with fictional and possession could be criminalised on online with virtually enforced if EU's Chat Control is adopted.
Russia (including occupied Ukraine)	Illegal	Illegal	Legal	Storage with the intent of distribution of child pornography is illegal in Russia according to article 242-1 of the Criminal Code. There is also nothing in the law that prohibits simple possession of child pornography. Fictional forms are illegal unless they have historical value.
Serbia	Illegal	Legal; not "abusive"	Legal; Fictional only	Child pornography is illegal in Serbia under article 185 of the criminal code, being punishable by up to 5 years imprisonment. Fictional forms are not criminalized unless they are found to be abusive to a "juvenile" by electronic or other means.
Slovakia	Illegal	No data	Illegal	Child pornography (including possession) is illegal in Slovakia under sections 368-370 of the criminal code. Penalties range from two to 20 years' imprisonment. Section 127 of the criminal code defines "child" as "a person under eighteen years of age, unless [they] ha[ve] reached the legal age earlier". The section defines child pornography as "pornographic material that visually depicts sexual intercourse, different act of sexual intercourse, or other conduct similar to sexual intercourse with a child, or naked parts of the child’s body, and that is designed to gratify sexual desire of another." It is not known if fictional content would fall under that definition. However, in June 2013, the law was amended to prohibit "depiction of real or pretended intercourse, another method of sexual intercourse or other similar sexual intercourse with a child or a person who looks like a child, or the depiction of exposed parts of the body of a child or a person who looks like a child aimed at inducing the sexual satisfaction of another person". Accordingly, it is probable that fictional depictions fall under this definition. All forms of child pornography even with fictional and possession could be criminalised on online with virtually enforced if EU's Chat Control is adopted.
Slovenia	Illegal	Legally unclear; not realistic	Legally unclear: fictional	Child pornography (including possession) is illegal in Slovenia under article 176 of the criminal code. While the law also covers "pornographic or other sexual material depicting minors or their realistic images", no definition of "realistic" is given. All forms of child pornography even with fictional and possession could be criminalised on online with virtually enforced if EU's Chat Control is adopted.
Spain	Illegal	Legal; not realistic	Legal; fictional only	Child pornography (including "real" possession) is illegal in Spain per Article 189 of the Spanish criminal code. Exceptions include fictional depictions that are not realistic enough to fall under the scope of the law. All forms of child pornography even with fictional and possession could be criminalised on online with virtually enforced if EU's Chat Control is adopted.
Sweden	Illegal	Legally unclear	Legally unclear: fictional	Child pornography (including "real" possession) is illegal in Sweden per chapter 16, section 10A of the Swedish penal code. In terms of "fictional" depictions, Sweden's supreme court ruled that a "manga expert" could keep one or two drawings in his possession that could, in other cases, be regarded as illegal child pornography. All forms of child pornography even with fictional and possession could be criminalised on online with virtually enforced if EU's Chat Control is adopted.
Switzerland	Illegal	Illegal	Illegal	Child pornography, including possession, is illegal in Switzerland per article 197 of the Swiss Criminal Code. This law includes purely fictional forms such as drawings or virtual depictions by 2022.
Ukraine	Illegal	Illegal	Illegal	Child pornography is illegal in Ukraine which defines it as a "depicting in any way a child or a person who looks like a child, in a real or simulated sexually explicit image or involved in real or simulated sexual behaviour, or any image of the child's genitals for sexual purposes". Penalty will be 5-10 years in prison. Article 301-1 of the Criminal Code (added in 2021) prohibits possession. As Ukraine is currently subject to an invasion, occupied land controlled by Russia is in a legal gray area even though it's still illegal in Russia, except for possessing. All forms of pornography are prohibited.
United Kingdom (including all territories)	Illegal	Illegal; Legal in Scotland	Illegal; legal for fictional only in Scotland	All forms of child pornography (real or fictional) including possession is illegal in the United Kingdom per the Protection of Children Act of 1978 and the Coroners and Justice Act 2009, The 2009 law does not apply in Scotland. The law includes real and fictional "indecent pseudo-photographs of a child". Punishments for indictment incur a maximum of 10 years imprisonment and 3 years imprisonment for possession on fictional forms but not in Scotland for the fictional. Attempts was made by Online Safety Act 2023 to scan all forms of child pornography on online including end-to-end encryption like the EU's Chat Control proposal which experts say is not possible to implement without undermining users' privacy.
Vatican City	Illegal	No data	Illegal	Pope Francis specifically listed possession of child pornography as a crime against children that can be punished by up to 12 years in prison.
Country	Real	Fictional	Possession	Short summary

=== Oceania ===
Country	Real	Fictional	Possession	Short summary
Australia (all states and territories)	Illegal	Illegal	Illegal	Acts such as possession, imports even on device, production and distribution of child pornography (real or fictional) are illegal in Australia, and can be punished by up to a maximum penalty of 15 years in prison or a $275,000 fine. Australia has strictest laws and enforcement in the world against fictional child porn since RC enforcement and stricter airport device checks.
Federated States of Micronesia	Illegal; in Pohnpei	No data	No data	Only Pohnpei has a statute prohibiting child pornography. Both Chuuk and Pohnpei have provisions against filming explicit movies of underage children, but Yap and Kosrae have no such provisions.
Fiji	Illegal	No data	Illegal	Child pornography is illegal in Fiji per Article 91 of the "Employment Relations Promulgation" (2007), and Article 62A of the "Juveniles Act". This law includes the wording: "persons who look like juveniles whether they are or not".
Kiribati	Legally unclear	Legally unclear	Legally unclear	The status of child pornography in Kiribati is unclear. A report by the United States Department of State conducted in 2020 explains that "(Kiribati's) penal code has no specific provision concerning child pornography". This however, contradicts an apparent amendment made in 2016 to their penal code.
Marshall Islands	Illegal; not defined	No data	Legal	Child pornography is criminalized, but not defined in the Marshall Islands. There is no mention of production, possession or dissemination of child pornography in the law.
Nauru	Illegal	No data	No data	All forms of child pornography are illegal in Nauru. It is unclear if this applies to unrealistic images or for possession.
New Zealand (including all territories)	Illegal	Illegal	Illegal	Browsing for, distributing, producing, and possessing child pornography are all illegal in New Zealand.
Palau	Illegal	Illegal	Illegal	All forms of child pornography are illegal in Palau. This law makes no exceptions for simple possession, photographs, films, videos, pictures, and computer-generated images or pictures.
Papua New Guinea	Illegal	Illegal	Illegal	All forms of pornography (including websites) are illegal in Papua New Guinea. Child pornography is punishable by 5 to 15 years' imprisonment or a fine up to 2 million kina.
Samoa	Illegal	Illegal	Illegal	Samoan law specifies a seven-year prison sentence for any person found guilty of possessing, publishing, distributing, or exhibiting indecent material featuring a child.
Solomon Islands	Illegal	No data	Illegal	Child pornography is illegal in the Solomon Islands, and carries a maximum penalty of 10 years' imprisonment.
Tonga	Legal: film production only	No data	Illegal	Child pornography and possession is illegal in Tonga with penalties of a maximum fine of TOP 100,000 ($43,000) or a maximum of 10 years in prison for individuals. Using children younger than 14 in the production of pornography is not criminalized.
Tuvalu	Legally unclear	No data	Illegal; adult pornography	All forms of pornography are prohibited, and the penal code includes penalties for those who make, distribute, or possess obscene publications. However, Tuvaluan law does not specifically address child pornography.
Vanuatu	Illegal	No data	Illegal	The maximum penalty in Vanuatu for publishing child pornography is five years' imprisonment, and for possession, two years' imprisonment.
Country	Real	Fictional	Possession	Short summary

== See also ==
- Legal status of fictional pornography depicting minors
- Pornography laws by region
