= Pornography laws by region =

De jure status of pornography: Legal, but with certain exceptions such as zoophilic pornography and child pornography Partially legal, under some broad restrictions Illegal to produce, distribute and/or possess Data unavailable

Pornography laws by region vary across jurisdictions in terms of definitions and restrictions on pornography. The production, distribution, and possession of pornographic films, photographs, and similar material are activities that are legal in many but not all countries, providing that any specific people featured in the material have consented to being included and are above a certain age. Various other restrictions often apply as well (e.g. to protect those who have intellectual disabilities or are highly intoxicated). The minimum age requirement for performers is most typically 18 years.

Pornography is usually expressed as obscene material by law and the meaning and range of obscenity differ from country to county. Most western countries allow hard-core pornography showing genitals and actual penetrations while other countries only allow soft-core pornography without showing genitals and actual penetrations. There are countries that ban pornography completely. It is illegal only to distribute and sell pornography in some countries, while in some countries it is even illegal to possess and watch it.

This article excludes material considered child pornography or zoophilic pornography. In most cases the legality of child pornography and the legality of zoophilic pornography are treated as separate issues, and they are usually subject to additional, specialized laws. Specialized laws to address the emerging phenomenon of "deep fake" pornographic content became an active subject of law-making and litigation in the 2020s, although fictional and semi-fictional pornography have existed throughout history. However, this news is subject to litigation.

== Summary of pornography laws ==
This is a summary table of laws and their enforcement by governments. The subsequent sections contain more detail on each of the jurisdictions.

=== Africa ===
Country (Note: This only includes sovereign states)	Legal texts	Enforcement
Angola	It is illegal to import pornography into Angola. However, the law about possession and distribution is not clearly stated.	
Botswana	Under the article 178, the possession of "indecent and obscene material such as pornographic books, magazines, films, videos, DVDs, Blu-Ray, VHS, and software" is prohibited in Botswana. Possession or import of such material is illegal and punishable by a fine or up to four years imprisonment.	
Djibouti	The sale, manufacture, or distribution of all pornography, including child pornography, is prohibited, and is punishable by one year's imprisonment and a fine of up to 200,000 DJF ($1,130).	
Egypt	Distribution is illegal Possession and access of pornography are not criminalised.	No broad internet blocks
Eritrea	Article 313. (Obscene or Indecent Publications): 1. A person who publicly distributes, displays or traffics in writings, images, posters, films, possession, objects or other communications that are obscene or grossly indecent, is guilty of obscenity, a Class 1 petty offence, punishable with a definite term of imprisonment of not less than 6 months and not more than 12 months, or a fine of 20,001 – 50,000 Nakfas, to be set in intervals of 2,500 Nakfas.; 2. It is not an offence under sub-Article (1) where the conduct takes place in private, or where the material is artistic, literary or scientific in character.	
Eswatini	Under the Sexual Offences and Domestic Violence Act, No. 15 or 2018, the publication, viewership, and sharing of pornography is legal in Eswatini only if it passes a three-element test. Pornography is legal if it does not involve any non-consenting persons (including children or those with a significant disability), can be easily traced to its creator, and does not otherwise depict a sexual offense.	
Ethiopia	Article 609 (Obscene or Indecent Publications) (1) Whosoever: (a) makes, imports or exports, transports, receives, possesses, display in public, of fern for sale or hire, distributes or circulates writing images, posters, films or other objects which are obscene or grossly indecent, or in any other way trafficks or trades in them; or (b) advertises, indicates or makes known, by any means, how or from whom such objects may be procured or circulated, either directly or indirectly, is punishable with simple imprisonment or fine, without prejudice to the forfeiture and destruction of the incriminating material. (2) Simple imprisonment shall be for not less than one month, and the fine, according to the circumstances, shall not exceed ten thousand dollars, where the offender: (a) habitually engages in or carries on such traffic; or (b) knowingly exhibits, hands over or delivers such objects to an infant or young person for a consideration.	
Gabon	Article 430. Anyone who, with a view to distribution, fixes, records or transmits an image or of an adult when this image or this representation presents a pornographic scene is punishable by up to "five years' imprisonment and a fine of up to 10,000,000 FCFA fine".	
Ghana	Article 281. (Further Offences Relating to Obscenity): 1. Any person who: (a) for the purposes of or by way of trade, or for the purposes of distribution or public exhibition, makes, produces, or has in his possession any one or more obscene writings, drawings, prints, paintings, printed matter, pictures, posters, emblems, photographs, cinematograph films, or any other obscene objects [...] : shall be guilty of a misdemeanour.	
Kenya	Article 166. (Traffic in obscene publication): 1. Any person who: (a) for the purpose of or by way of trade or for the purpose of distribution or public exhibition, makes, produces or has in his possession any one or more obscene writings, drawings, prints, paintings, printed matter, pictures, posters, emblems, photographs, cinematograph -films or any other objects or any other object tending to corrupt morals [...] : is guilty of a misdemeanour, and is liable, to imprisonment for two years or to a fine of seven thousand shillings.	
Malawi	Article 179 (Obscene matters or things) (1) Any person who— (a) makes, produces or has in his possession any one or more obscene writings, drawings, prints, paintings, printed matter, pictures, posters, emblems, photographs, photographic negatives or prints, cinematograph films, gramophone records or other contrivances for the reproduction of sound or any other obscene objects or any other objects tending to corrupt morals; is guilty of an offence and shall be liable to a fine of K500,000 and to imprisonment for a term of two years.	
Morocco (including Western Sahara)	In 2004, Morocco introduced severe punishments for promoting pornography.	
Nigeria		
South Africa	Pornography rated X18 is permitted by the law only if sold to persons over the age of 18 in registered stores. The creation of pornographic content is regulated and every performer must be 18 years or older to participate.	
South Sudan	Article 260. (Sale of Obscene Books etc.): 1. Whoever, sells, distributes, possession, imports or prints, or makes for sale or hire or willfully exhibits to public view any obscene writing, book, newspaper, film, gramophone record or similar article, drawing, painting, representation or figure or attempts or offers so to do or has in his or her possession any such obscene book or other thing for the purpose of sale, distribution or public exhibition, commits an offence, and upon conviction, shall be sentenced to imprisonment for a term not exceeding three years or with a fine or with both.	
Sudan	Article 235. (Sale etc. of Obscene Books etc): 1. Whoever sells or distributes, imports or prints, or makes for sale or hire or willfully exhibits to public view any obscene writing, book, newspaper, film, gramophone record or similar article, drawing, painting, representation or figure or attempts or offers so to do or has in his possession any such obscene book or other thing for the purpose of sale, distribution or public exhibition, commits an offence and shall on conviction, be punished with imprisonment for a term not exceeding three years or with fine or with both.	
Tanzania	Article 175.: 1. Any person who: (a) for the purpose of or by way of trade or for the purpose of distribution or public exhibition, makes, produces or has in his possession any one or more obscene writings, drawings, prints, paintings, printed matter, pictures» posters, emblems, photographs, cinematograph -films or any other objects or any other object tending to corrupt morals [...] : is guilty of a misdemeanour, and is liable, to imprisonment for two years or to a fine of two thousand shillings.	In June 2025, the social media platform X was banned in the country after it was discovered that the app had allowed “explicit sexual material” to be distributed, which included same-sex pornography.
Uganda	Made illegal in 2014 up to 10 years in prison, defined as "any representation of the sexual parts of a person for primarily sexual excitement".	In July 2018, the Ugandan government directed the country's ISPs to block 27 pornographic websites.
Zambia	Article 177. (Obscene matters or things): 1. Any person who makes, produces or has in his possession any one or more obscene writings, drawings, prints, paintings, printed matter, pictures, posters, emblems, photographs, cinematograph films or any other object tending to corrupt morals is guilty of a misdemeanour and is liable to imprisonment for five years or to a fine of not less than fifteen thousand penalty units nor more than seventy-five thousand penalty units.	
Country	Legal texts	

=== Asia ===
Country	Legal texts	Enforcement
Bangladesh	Pornography Law 2012	Banned and Punishable by Jail
Bhutan	Article 381. (Lewd and lascivious conduct ) A defendant shall be guilty of the offence of lewd and lascivious conduct, if the defendant: (b) Sells, manufactures, issues, distributes, displays or otherwise deals in obscene material. Article 476. (Computer pornography ) A defendant shall be guilty of the offence of computer pornography, if the defendant: (a) Publishes and distributes an obscene photograph or picture on the computer or over the internet; or (b) Is an internet service provider, who knowingly acts as a host for pornographic material or acts as a channel for the image to be transmitted to an individual user.	
People's Republic of China	Article 363, Section 9 (Crimes of Manufacturing, Trafficking in and Disseminating Pornographic Articles) Whoever produces, duplicates, publishes, trafficking in or disseminates pornographic articles for the purpose of making profits shall be sentenced to fixed-term imprisonment of not more than three years, criminal detention or public surveillance, and concurrently be sentenced to a fine; if the circumstances are serious, the offender shall be sentenced to fixed-term imprisonment of not less than three years and not more than ten years, and concurrently be sentenced to a fine; if the circumstances are especially serious, the offender shall be sentenced to fixed-term imprisonment of not less than ten years or life imprisonment, and concurrently be sentenced to a fine or confiscation of property. Whoever provides book numbers for others to publish pornographic books and periodicals shall be sentenced to fixed-term imprisonment of not more than three years, criminal detention or public surveillance, and concurrently or independently be sentenced to a fine. If anyone provides others with book numbers which he clearly knows to be used to publish pornographic books and periodicals, he shall be punished according to the provisions in the preceding paragraph. Article 364, Section 9 (Crimes of Manufacturing, Trafficking in and Disseminating Pornographic Articles) Whoever disseminates in society pornographic books and periodicals, movies, video- and audio-tapes, pictures or any other pornographic articles shall, if the circumstances are serious, be sentenced to fixed-term imprisonment of not more than two years, criminal detention or public surveillance. Whoever organizes shows of pornographic films or videos or other video- or audio-tapes shall be sentenced to fixed-term imprisonment of not more than three years, criminal detention or public surveillance, and concurrently be sentenced to a fine; if the circumstances are serious, the offender shall be sentenced to fixed-term imprisonment of not less than three years and not more than ten years, and concurrently be sentenced to a fine. Whoever manufactures or duplicates pornographic films or videos or other video- or audio-tapes and organizes shows of them shall be given a heavier punishment according to the provisions in the second paragraph. Whoever disseminates pornographic articles to minors under the age of 18 shall be given a heavier punishment. Article 11, Public Security Administration Punishments Law Contraband seized in dealing with cases of public security such as drugs and pornographic items, gambling devices, money for gambling, devices used for ingesting or injecting drugs, and the instruments owned and directly used by the persons in their conduct violating public security administration shall be taken and disposed of in accordance with relevant regulations. Article 52, Law on the Protection of Minors It is prohibited to produce, reproduce, publish, transmit, or possess obscene or pornographic works and online information related to minors.	In late June 2025, sources reported that around 30 to 50 writers were arrested for writing gay erotica, or “danmei” since February of that same year.
Hong Kong		
India (including all states and union territories)	Bharatiya Nyaya Sanhita, 2023, Section 294, 295 and 296 and IT Act-67B. (Illegal dissemination of pornographic materials) & (Illegal Child Pornography): 1. Anyone who sells, lets to hire, distributes, exhibits or circulates to any person under the age of 20 years any such obscene object a Illegal manufacture, sale as well as, dissemination of pornographic materials or items, as well as, printed publications will severely punished with a fine in the amount of 2000 rupees fine for monthly term, or with imprisonment for the term of up to 7 years.; 2. Whoever browses, publishes, creates, downloads obscene content of child pornography which are strictly prohibited will be punished with imprisonment of 5 years and 10 lakh rupees fine.	Blocking orders by the government to ISPs
Indonesia	(Republic of Indonesia Law No. 44 Year 2008 on Pornography, Article 29 and 32) Pasal 29 (Article 29) (Every person who produces, makes, reproduces, duplicates, spreads, airs, imports, exports, offers, trades, rents, or provides pornography as meant in Article 4 paragraph (1) shall be punished with imprisonment of at least 6 (six) months and at most 12 (twelve) years and/or a fine of at least Rp250.000.000,00 (two hundred fifty million rupiah) and at most Rp6.000.000.000,00 (six billion rupiah).) Pasal 32 (Article 32) (Every person who plays, displays, utilizes, possesses, or stores pornographic products as meant in Article 6 shall be punished with imprisonment of up to 4 (four) years and/or a fine of at least Rp250.000.000,00 (two hundred fifty million rupiah) and at most Rp6.000.000.000,00 (6 billion rupiah).)	Indonesia blocks any websites, as well as social networks that allow pornography. Examples of this include Reddit and Newgrounds, which are blocked in Indonesia. On July 23, 2023, X, which had just recently rebranded from its old name of Twitter at the time, was blocked in Indonesia due to prior usage of its domain, X.com, by sites that have violated these laws as well as laws regarding other “negative” content, such as gambling. In June 2024, Indonesia threatened to ban X if it did not comply with the country’s pornography laws, with the Minister of Communication and Informatics, Budi Arie Setiadi, saying that the app “will certainly shut it services down” if it does not do so.
Iran	Pornography is illegal under Iranian law, which is based on Sharia Law.	Death penalty.
Iraq	Penal Code — Paragraph 403; Law on Combatting Prostitution	All pornography sites are banned in federal Iraq as of 2022; No bans in autonomous Iraqi Kurdistan Region
Japan	Article 175. (Distribution of Obscene Objects ) A person who distributes, sells or displays in public an obscene document, drawing or other objects shall be punished by imprisonment with work for not more than 2 years, a fine of not more than 2,500,000 yen or a petty fine.	Pornography showing sexual genitals is illegal in Japan. Pornography that blurs out sexual genitals is considered legal, which is distributed under the name “Adult Video” or AV for short.; In 2011, Article 175 was amended to include the law’s application to digital pornography as well.
North Korea	Article 193 (Import, Keeping and Distribution of Decadent Culture) A person who, without authorization, imports, makes, distributes or illegally keeps music, dance, drawings, photos, books, video recordings or electronic media that reflects decadent, carnal or foul contents shall be punished by short term labour for less than two years. In cases where the person commits a grave offence, he or she shall be punished by reform through labour for less than five years. In cases where such a person imports, keeps or distributes sexual video recordings, the punishment shall be reform through labour for more than five years and less than ten years. Article 194 (Conduct of Decadent Acts) A person who watches or listens to music, dance, drawings, photos, books, video recordings or electronic media that reflects decadent, carnal or foul contents or who performs such acts himself or herself shall be punished by short term labour for less than two years. In cases where the person commits a grave offence, he or she shall be punished by reform through labour for less than five years.	In December 2019, a group of 13 students from Kim Il Sung University were arrested over alleged pornography distribution and production. As the majority of North Koreans do not have access to the internet, many types of foreign media, including pornography, is smuggled physically.
South Korea	Article 243 (Distribution, etc. of Obscene Pictures): 1. Any person who distributes, sells, lends, openly displays or shows any obscene documents, drawing, pictures, films or other things, shall be punished by imprisonment for not more than one year or by a fine not exceeding five million won.; Article 244 (Manufacture, etc. of Obscene Pictures): 1. A person who, for the purpose of accomplishing the acts as prescribed in Article 243, manufactures, possesses, imports or exports obscene goods, shall be punished by imprisonment for not more than one year or by a fine not exceeding five million won.; Article 44-7 (Prohibition on Circulation of Unlawful Information): 1. No one may circulate any of the following information through an information and communications network: 1. Information with obscene content distributed, sold, rented, or displayed openly in the form of code, words, sound, images, or motion picture;	Article 243 and 244 do not apply to online pornography.
Laos	Article 138. (Dissemination of Pornographic Objects and Objects Contrary to Fine Traditions): 1. Any person engaging in the widespread production, distribution, or dissemination of pornographic items, magazines, pictures, video cassettes and other materials contrary to fine traditions shall be punished by three months to one year of imprisonment and shall be fined from 200,000 Kip to 5,000,000 Kip.	
Macau		
Malaysia	Section 292. (Sale, etc., of obscene books, etc.) Whoever— (a) sells, lets to hire, distributes, publicly exhibits or in any manner puts into circulation, or for purposes of sale, hire, distribution, transmission, public exhibition or circulation, makes, produces or has in his possession any obscene book, pamphlet, paper, drawing, painting, representation or figure, or any other obscene object or document whatsoever; [...] shall be punished with imprisonment for a term which may extend to three years or with fine or with both. Section 293. (Sale, etc., of obscene objects or documents to young person) Whoever sells, lets to hire, distributes, exhibits or circulates to any person under the age of twenty years any such obscene object or document as is referred to in the last preceding section, or offers or attempts so to do, shall be punished with imprisonment for a term which may extend to five years or with fine or with both.	
Maldives	Article 622. (Producing or Distributing Obscene Material): 1. A person commits an offense if, with knowledge of its obscene nature or content, he: (1) Sells, delivers, or provides one or more obscene writings, pictures, records, or other representations or embodiments of the obscene; or [...] (6) Creates, buys, procures, or possesses obscene matter or material with the purpose of distributing it in violation of this Section. [...] The offenses in Subsections (a)(1) through (a)(6) are Class 1 misdemeanors.	
Mongolia	Article 123. (Advertising and dissemination of pornography and prostitution): 1. W Preparation, dissemination, sale, display to the public, crossing of the state frontier of the press, literature, films, video tapes and other items advertising pornography shall be punishable by a fine equal to 31 to 50 amounts of minimum salary or by incarceration for a term of 1 to 3 months.	
Nepal	Article 121 of Criminal Code 2071 states that the production and distribution of “sexually obscene contents” is prohibited in Nepal.	
Philippines	Section 4.e of the Anti-Trafficking in Persons Act of 2003. Section 4. Acts of Trafficking in Persons. It shall be unlawful for any person, natural or juridical, to commit any of the following acts: (e) To maintain or hire a person to engage in prostitution or pornography;	
Qatar	Article 292. (Sale of obscene books, etc.): 1. Whoever produces, imports, exports, possesses or transports immoral books, prints, writings, drawings, photos, movies or symbols for the purpose of exploitation, distribution or display shall be punished with imprisonment for a term not exceeding one year and/or a fine not exceeding five thousand Qatari Riyals (QR 5.000).	
Saudi Arabia	Pornography is a crime under the Sharia Law.	
Singapore	Article 292. (Sale of obscene books, etc.): 1. Whoever sells, lets to hire, distributes, transmits by electronic means, publicly exhibits or in any manner puts into circulation, or for purposes of sale, hire, distribution, transmission, public exhibition or circulation, makes, produces, or has in his possession any obscene book, pamphlet, paper, drawing, painting, representation or figure, or any other obscene object whatsoever shall be punished with imprisonment for a term which may extend to 3 months, or with fine, or with both.	
Sri Lanka	Article 285. (Sale, &c. of obscene books .&c.): 1. Whoever sells or distributes, imports, or prints for sale or hire, or wilfully exhibits to public view, any obscene book, pamphlet, paper, drawing, painting, photograph, representation, or figure, or attempts or offers so to do, shall be punished with imprisonment of either description for a term which may extend to three months, or with fine, or with both.; Article 286. (Having in possession obscene books, &c for sale or public exhibition. ): 1. Whoever has in his possession any such obscene book or other thing as is mentioned in the last preceding section for the purpose of sale, distribution, or public exhibition, shall be punished with imprisonment of either description for a term which may extend to three months. Or with fine, or with both.	
Syria		
Taiwan	J.Y. Interpretation No. 617 & Article 235 of the Criminal Code.	
Tajikistan		
Thailand	Section 287.: 1. Whoever for the purpose of trade or by trade, for public distribution or exhibition, makes, produces, possesses, brings or causes to be brought into the Kingdom, sends or causes to be sent out of the Kingdom, takes away or causes to be taken away, or circulates by any means whatever, any document, drawing, print, painting, printed matter, picture, poster, symbol, photograph, cinematograph film, noise tape, picture tape or any other thing which is obscene [...] shall be punished with imprisonment not exceeding three years or fined not exceeding six thousand Baht, or both.	
Turkey	Section 226 of Turkey Penal Code (Obscenity): 1. Section 226.; (1) A person who, (a) shows or reads obscene text, images or words to a child, or makes a child listen or read obscene text, images or words, (b) places, displays or shows obscene content in places which children can see, read or hear (c) sells or rents obscene content in a way that may aims to hide the actual content (d) sells or rents obscene content in places where it's not allowed (e) distributes obscene content with other (non-obscene) content is punished with imprisonment from six months to two years and a judicial fine (2) A person who publishes obscene images, texts or words through press or broadcasting, or who mediates its publication is punished with imprisonment from six months to three years and a judicial fine of up to five thousand days. (3) A person who represents or uses images of children or people who appear to be children in the production of products containing obscene images, text or words, is punished with imprisonment from five to ten years and a judicial fine of up to five thousand days. A person who reproduces, offers for sale, sells, transports, stores, exports, keeps, brings these products into the country or makes them available for others is punished with imprisonment from two years to five years and a judicial fine of up to five thousand days. (4) A person who produces, reproduces, offers for sale, sells, transports, stores, exports, keeps, brings products that contain obscene content with violence, animals, dead human bodies or unatural sexual behavior into the country or makes these content available for others is punished with imprisonment from one to four years and a judicial fine of up to five thousand days. (5) A person who publishes the contents of the products in the third and fourth paragraphs through press and publication or broadcasting or who allows children to see, listen to or read this content is punished with imprisonment from six to ten years and a judicial fine of up to five thousand days. (6) Due to these crimes, security measures specific to legal entities are imposed on them. (7) The provisions of this section (excluding the third paragraph) do not apply to scientific, artistic and literary works, as long as children are prevented from accessing these works.	Blocking access to some websites that allow users to share pornographic content
Turkmenistan		
Uzbekistan		
Vietnam	Article 326. (Distribution pornographic materials): 1. Any person who makes, duplicates, publishes, transports, deals in, or stores books, magazines, pictures, films, music, or other items that contain pornographic contents for the purpose of distributing them or distributes pornographic materials in any of the following cases shall be a fine of from VND 10,000,000 to VND 100,000,000 or face a penalty of up to 3 years' community sentence or 6 – 36 months' imprisonment	
Country	Legal texts	

=== Europe ===
Country	Legal texts	Enforcement
Albania	Article 117. Production, distribution, advertisement, export, import, sale, and publication of pornographic materials in environments with children, by any means or form, shall constitute criminal contravention and shall be punishable by imprisonment of up to two years. Production, import, offering, making available, distribution, broadcasting, use, or possession of child pornography, as well as the conscious creation of access in it, by any means or form, shall be punishable by three to ten years of imprisonment. Recruitment, exploitation, compulsion, or the persuasion of a child to participate in pornographic shows, as well as the participation in such shows which involve the participation of children, shall be punishable by five to ten years of imprisonment.	
Andorra		
Austria	Article 1. (Judicial Criminal and Procedural Provisions) § 1. (1) Anyone who, with the intention of making a profit, commits any of the following acts is guilty of a crime: a) produces, publishes, or stocks obscene writings, illustrations, moving images, or other obscene objects for the purpose of distribution; b) imports, transports, or exports such objects; c) offers or transfers such objects to others, publicly displays, posts, advertises, or otherwise distributes them, or shows such moving images to others, d) publicly or in front of several people or in printed works or distributed writings offers to perform one of the acts described in lit. a to c, e) announces in the manner described in lit. d how, from whom, or through whom obscene items can be acquired or borrowed, or where such items can be viewed.; (2) The offense is punishable by imprisonment for up to one year. In addition to imprisonment, a fine of up to 360 daily rates may be imposed. (3) If the offense was committed in relation to a printed work, the provisions of the Press Act applicable to the offense under § 516 StG. concerning the forfeiture of the printed work, the destruction of the plates and molds used for its production, the provisional seizure, and criminal proceedings in press matters shall apply in accordance with their meaning. § 2: (1) Anyone who knowingly commits any of the following acts is guilty of an offense: a) offers or transfers, for a fee, to a person under the age of 16, any writing, illustration, or other representation that is likely to endanger the moral or physical development of young persons by arousing lust or misleading the sexual instinct, or any film or sound recording of this kind, or; exhibits, displays, posts, or otherwise distributes such a document, illustration, or other representation in such a way that the offensive content also becomes accessible to a larger group of persons under the age of 16, c) shows such a moving image or sound recording to a person under the age of 16 or makes a theater performance or other performance or event of the type described accessible to such a person.; (2) Unless the act is punishable by a more severe penalty under other provisions, it shall be punished with imprisonment of up to six months or a fine of up to 360 daily rates.	
Belarus	Article 343. (Production and distribution of pornographic materials or items of a pornographic nature): 1. Storage for the purpose of distribution or advertising or distribution, advertising of pornographic materials, printed publications, images, films, videos or scenes of pornographic content, other items of a pornographic nature, committed within a year after the imposition of an administrative penalty for the same violations, as well as production for the purpose of distribution or advertising or broadcast or public display of pornographic materials, printed publications, images, films, videos or scenes of pornographic content, other items of a pornographic nature shall be punished by community service, or a fine, or correctional labor for up to two years, or arrest.; 2. Production or storage for the purpose of distribution or advertising or distribution, advertising, broadcast or public display of pornographic materials, printed publications, images, films, videos or scenes of pornographic content, other items of a pornographic nature, committed for mercenary reasons or by an organized group, or likewise, distribution, advertising, broadcast or demonstration of pornographic materials, printed publications, images, films, videos or scenes of pornographic content, or other items of a pornographic nature, to a minor, committed by a person who has reached the age of eighteen, shall be punishable by restriction of freedom for a term of two to four years or imprisonment for the same term."	
Belgium	Further information: Pornography in Belgium	
Bosnia and Herzegovina		
Bulgaria	Article 159.: 1. A person who produces, displays, presents, broadcasts, distributes, sells, rents or otherwise circulates a pornographic material, shall be punished by deprivation of liberty of up to one year and a fine of BGN one thousand (1,000) to three thousand (3,000).	
Croatia		
Czech Republic	Further information: Pornography in the Czech Republic	
Denmark (including all territories)	Further information: Pornography in Denmark	
Estonia	Further information: Pornography in Estonia	
Finland (including Åland)		
France (including all territories)		
Germany		
Greece		
Hungary	Section 204 and 204A of Hungary Criminal Code.: 1. Section 204.; (1) A person who has taken a pornographic photograph depicting a person who has not reached the age of eighteen (a) acquires or retains, for a criminal offense, from one year to five years, (b) offers, transfers or makes available, for a criminal offense, from two to eight years, (c) makes, places on the market, trades in or makes available such recordings for a period of five to ten years for criminal offenses; shall be punishable by a term of imprisonment of (2) The punishment shall be imprisonment for a term of two to eight years in the case of subparagraph (a), five to ten years in the case of subparagraph (b) and five to fifteen years in the case of subparagraph (c), if the offense is defined therein. (a) to the detriment of a person under the age of twelve, (b) to the detriment of a person under the education, supervision, care or treatment of the offender or to abuse any other power or influence in relation to the victim, or to exploit the vulnerable position of the victim, (c) as an official, using that grade, (d) recording involving harassment or the use of force; or (e) as a particular recidivist are committed. (3) The penalty shall be imprisonment for a term of five to ten years in the case of subparagraph (a), five to fifteen years in the case of subparagraph (b) and five years to twenty years in the case of subparagraph (c) if the offense specified therein is not completed within the age of twelve years. harassment or the use of force. (4) Who is defined in paragraph 1 (c) a) provides material means for a criminal offense, from one year to five years for a criminal offense, (b) prepares for a criminal offense for a period of three years shall be punishable by a term of imprisonment of (5) A person who depicts pornography depicting a person who has reached the age of fourteen but has not reached the age of eighteen (a) acquires or retains for three years as a result of a criminal offense, b) prepares, for a crime of one to five years shall be punishable by a term of imprisonment of one of the persons referred to in points (b) to (e) of paragraph 2. (6) Whoever invites a person or persons under the age of eighteen to participate in pornographic recording shall be punished by imprisonment for a term of one to five years for a criminal offense. 7. Whoever calls on a person or persons who have reached the age of fourteen but has not reached the age of eighteen to take part in pornographic performances shall be punishable by a term of imprisonment of up to three years if one of the circumstances specified in paragraph 2 (b) to (e) does not exist. (8) For the purposes of this section, pornographic recording shall mean the depiction of another person or others in a manner that is seriously defamatory of sex, in a manner intended to arouse sexual desire, including a realistic depiction of a non-existent person or persons. Section 204A.: 1. (1) A person; (a) participates in a pornographic program involving a person under the age of eighteen years or persons appearing for such an offense as a criminal offense between the ages of two and eight years; (b) engages in or organizes a pornographic program of a person or persons below the age of eighteen years, for a period of five to ten years as a result of a criminal offense; shall be punishable by a term of imprisonment of (2) The punishment shall be imprisonment for a term of five to ten years in the case of paragraph 1 (a) and five to fifteen years in the case of paragraph (b) if the offense specified therein is (a) to the detriment of a person under the age of twelve, (b) to the detriment of a person under the education, supervision, care or treatment of the offender or to abuse any other power or influence in connection with the victim, (c) as an official, using that grade, (d) a program of harassment or violence, or (e) as a particular recidivist are committed. (3) The punishment shall be imprisonment from five to fifteen years in the case of paragraph 1 (a) and from five to twenty years in the case of paragraph (b) if the offense specified therein is committed for the purpose of harassing or using violence against a person under the age of twelve. (4) Who is defined in paragraph 1 (b) a) provides material means for a criminal offense, from one year to five years for a criminal offense, (b) prepares for a criminal offense for a period of three years shall be punishable by a term of imprisonment of (5) Whoever invites a person or persons under the age of eighteen to participate in a pornographic program shall be punished by imprisonment for a term of one to five years for a criminal offense. (6) Whoever invites a person or persons who have reached the age of fourteen but has not reached the age of eighteen to participate in a pornographic program shall be punished by imprisonment for a term not exceeding three years if any of the circumstances specified in subsection (2) (b) to (e) do not exist. (7) For the purposes of this section, a pornographic program is an act or performance intended to arouse sexual desire by portraying the sex of another or others with serious oppression.	
Iceland	Article 210, Icelandic Criminal Law If pornography is published in print, the person responsible for publishing it in accordance with printing laws shall be subject to fines or imprisonment for up to 6 months. The same penalty applies to the production or importation for distribution purposes, sale, distribution or distribution in any other way of pornographic literature, pornographic images or other such items, or to having them on public display, as well as to the organization of a public lecture or play that is similarly immoral.	
(Republic of Ireland) Ireland		
Italy		
Latvia	Article 166. Violation of Provisions Regarding the Demonstration of a Pornographic Performance, Restriction of Entertainment of Intimate Nature and Handling of a Material of Pornographic Nature: 1. For a person who commits violation of the provisions regarding demonstration of a pornographic performance or other provisions regarding the restriction of entertainment of intimate nature, or provisions regarding the handling of a material of pornographic nature, if it has been committed on a significant scale or substantial harm has been caused by committing it, the applicable punishment is the deprivation of liberty for a period of up to one year or temporary deprivation of liberty, or community service, or a fine.; 2. For a person who commits visiting or demonstration of such pornographic performance or handling of such materials of pornographic nature which contain child pornography, sexual activities of people with animals, necrophilia or sexual gratification in a violent way, the applicable punishment is the deprivation of liberty for a period of up to three years or temporary deprivation of liberty, or community service, or a fine, with or without the confiscation of property and with probationary supervision for a period of up to three years.; 3. For a person who commits encouraging, involvement, forced participation or utilisation of minors in a pornographic performance or the production of a material of pornographic nature, the applicable punishment is deprivation of liberty for a period up to six years, with or without confiscation of property and with probationary supervision for a period up to three years.; 4. For a person who commits encouraging, involvement, forced participation or utilisation of persons who have not attained the age of sixteen years in a pornographic performance or the production of a material of pornographic nature, the applicable punishment is deprivation of liberty for a period of three years and up to twelve years, with or without confiscation of property and with probationary supervision for a period up to three years.; 5. For a person who commits the acts provided for in Paragraph three or four of this Section, if they have been committed by an organised group or if they have been committed by means of violence, the applicable punishment is deprivation of liberty for a period of five and up to fifteen years, with or without confiscation of property and with probationary supervision for a period up to three years.	
Liechtenstein		
Lithuania	Article 309. (Distribution of Pornographic Material): 1. A person who, for the purpose of distribution, produces or acquires pornographic material or distributes such material shall be punished by community service or by a fine or by restriction of liberty or by imprisonment for a term of up to one year.	
Luxembourg		
Malta		
Moldova	Article 90. Producing, selling, distributing or keeping pornographic products Producing, selling, broadcasting or keeping pornographic products to be sold or broadcast is sanctioned with a fine from 24 to 30 conventional units applied to the natural person, or with a fine from 60 to 90 conventional units applied to the legal person.	
Monaco		
Montenegro		
Netherlands (including all territories)	Article 240a. (Crimes against morality) With imprisonment of at most one year or a fine of the fourth category is punished he who gives, offers or shows an image, an object or a data carrier, containing an image of which the display is considered harmful for persons under the age of sixteen, to a minor of whom he knows or should reasonably suspect that this person is under the age of sixteen. Article 240b. (Crimes against morality): 1. With an imprisonment not exceeding four years or a fine of the fifth category is punished whoever distributes, offers, openly exhibits, manufactures, imports, implements, acquires, possesses or obtains access to an image – or a data carrier containing an image – of a sexual act, involving or seemingly involving someone who has evidently not reached the age of eighteen yet.; 2. A person who makes a profession or habit out of committing one of the offences described in paragraph 1 shall be punished with imprisonment of not more than eight years or a fine of category five.; Article 254a. (Crimes against morality): 1. A person who distributes, openly exhibits, manufactures, imports, transports, implements or possesses an image – or a data carrier containing an image – of a lewd act in which a human being and an animal are involved or appear to be involved, is liable to a term of imprisonment not exceeding six months or a fine of the third category.; 2. A person who makes a profession or habit out of committing any of the offences described in paragraph 1 shall be liable to imprisonment for a term not exceeding one year or to a fine of category four.	
North Macedonia		
Norway (including all territories)		
Poland	Article 202. (Offenses against sexual freedom and decency) §3. Who produces, preserves or imports, stores or possesses, for the purpose of dissemination, distributes or presents pornographic content involving a minor or pornographic content related to the presentation violence or use of an animal is punishable by imprisonment from 2 to 12 years.	
Portugal (including all territories)		
Romania		
Russia	Article 242. Illegal Making and Distribution of Pornographic Materials or Objects: 1. Illegal making and/or movement across the State Border of the Russian Federation for the purpose of distribution, public demonstration or advertising, or distribution, public demonstration or advertising of pornographic materials or objects, – shall be punishable with a fine in an amount of 100 thousand to 300 thousand roubles, or in the amount of a wage/salary, or any other income of the convicted person for a period of one to two years, or by compulsory labour for a term of up to two years, or by deprivation of liberty for the same term.; 2. Distribution, public demonstration or advertising of pornographic materials or objects to minors, or involvement of minors in distribution of pornographic materials effected by a person who has reached eighteen years of age – shall be punishable by deprivation of liberty for a term of two to five years with or without deprivation of the right to hold definite offices or to engage in definite activities for a term of up to ten years.; 3. The deeds provided for by Parts One or Two of this article committed: 1. by a group of persons by previous concert or by an organised group; 2. through the use of mass media, in particular information-telecommunication networks (including Internet); 3. with making profit on a large scale; shall be punishable by deprivation of liberty for a term of two to six years with or without deprivation of the right to hold definite offices or to engage in definite activities for a term of up to fifteen years. Note. As profit made on a large scale shall be deemed in this article, as well as in Article 242.1 of this Code, the profit in the amount exceeding fifty thousand roubles.	
San Marino		
Serbia	Article 185. (Showing, procuring and possession of Pornographic Material and Juvenile Pornography): 1. Whoever sells, shows or publicly displays or otherwise makes available texts, pictures, audio-visual or other items of pornographic content to a minor or shows to a child a pornographic performance, shall be punished with a fine or imprisonment up to six months.; 2. Whoever uses a minor to produce photographs, audio-visual or other items of pornographic content or for a pornographic show, shall be punished with imprisonment from six months to five years.; 3. If the offence referred to in paragraphs 1 and 2 hereof has been perpetrated against a child, the offender shall be punished with imprisonment of six months to three years for the offence from paragraph 1 and with imprisonment of one year to eight years for the offence from paragraph 2.; 4. Whoever obtains for himself or another, possesses, sells, shows, publicly exhibits or electronically or otherwise makes available pictures, audio-visual or other items of pornographic content resulting abuse of a juvenile, shall be punished with imprisonment from three months to three years.; 5. Items specified in paragraphs 1 through 4 of this Article shall be confiscated.	
Slovakia		
Slovenia		
Spain (including all territories)		
Sweden		
Switzerland		
Ukraine	Article 301. (Importation, making, sale or distribution of pornographic items): 1. Importation into Ukraine for sale or distribution purposes, or making, transportation or other movement for the same purposes, or sale or distribution of pornographic images or other items, and also compelling others to participate in their making, shall be punishable by a fine of 50 to 100 tax-free minimum incomes, or arrest for a term up to six months, or restraint of liberty for a term up from three to five years, with the forfeiture of pornographic images or other items and means of their making and distribution.	
United Kingdom (including all territories)	Further information: Pornography in the United Kingdom	Under the Online Safety Act 2023, online platforms must verify that users are over 18 years of age in order to access pornography. The Crime and Policing Act 2026 banned pornography depicting erotic asphyxiation.
Vatican City		
Country	Legal texts	

=== North-South America ===
Country	Legal texts	Enforcement
Antigua and Barbuda		
Argentina		
The Bahamas		
Barbados		
Belize	Article 323. (Obscene publication): 1. Every person who publishes or offers for sale any obscene book, writing or representation, shall be liable to imprisonment for two years.	
Bolivia		
Brazil		
Canada		
Chile		
Colombia		
Costa Rica		
Cuba		
Dominica		
Dominican Republic		
Ecuador		
El Salvador	It is illegal to import "obscene articles" into El Salvador.	
Grenada		
Guatemala		
Guyana		
Haiti	It is illegal to import pornography into Haiti.	
Honduras	It is illegal to import pornography into Honduras.	
Jamaica		
Mexico		
Nicaragua		
Panama		
Paraguay		
Peru		
Saint Kitts and Nevis		
Saint Lucia		
Saint Vincent and the Grenadines		
Suriname		
Trinidad and Tobago		
United States (including all territories)		
Uruguay		
Venezuela		
Country	Legal texts	

=== Oceania ===
Country	Legal texts		Enforcement
Australia	Criminal Code Act 1995		Online pornography is legal in Australia but restricted by ID since March 2026. However, pornographic DVDs and magazines (which have since become obsolete) are rated X18+ by the Australian Classification Board (ACB), meaning they are restricted to those over the age of 18. Furthermore, they can only be purchased in the Australian Capital Territory and some parts of the Northern Territory. However, there are over 100 Indigenous communities in the Northern Territory that are classified as "dry communities", where it has been illegal to sell alcohol and pornography since 2007. Pornography may be designated as Refused Classification, and therefore banned in Australia, if it depicts violence (including violence unrelated to sex); fetishes such as bondage pornography, urolagnia, and erotic spanking; adult actors playing underage-looking characters (e.g. the schoolgirl fetish); and "offensive or abhorrent" practices and fantasies such as incest pornography. Fictional pornography depicting minors is illegal; one high-profile case in 2008 had a man convicted of possessing pornographic cartoons depicting child characters from The Simpsons.
Australia	Australian Capital Territory	Crimes Act 1900	
Australia	New South Wales	Crimes Act 1900	
Australia	Northern Territory	Criminal Code Act 1983	
Australia	Queensland	Criminal Code Act 1899; Classification of Publications Act 1991; Classification of Films Act 1991; Classification of Computer Games and Images Act 1995	
Australia	South Australia	Criminal Law Consolidation Act 1935; Summary Offences Act 1953	
Australia	Tasmania	Criminal Code Act 1924; Police Offences Act 1935; Classification (Publications, Films and Computer Games) Enforcement Act 1995	
Australia	Victoria	Crimes Act 1958	
Australia	Western Australia	Criminal Code Act Compilation Act 1913	
Fiji	There is currently no law that prohibits online pornography in Fiji. However, pornography cannot be imported into Fiji.		
Kiribati	Article 166. (Traffic in obscene publication): 1. Any person who: (a) for the purpose of or by way of trade or for the purpose of distribution or public exhibition, makes, produces or has in his possession any one or more obscene writings, drawings, prints, paintings, printed matter, pictures, posters, emblems, photographs, cinematograph -films or any other objects or any other object tending to corrupt morals [...] : is guilty of a misdemeanour, and is liable, to imprisonment for two years or to a fine of two hundred dollars.		
Nauru	Pornography, including online pornography, is illegal in Nauru and pornographic websites are blocked.		
New Zealand			
Papua New Guinea			
Samoa	Pornography is illegal in American Samoa and is punishable by a fine of up to $USD5,000.		In 2021, a court ruled that online pornography should be blocked by Samoa's two major service providers, Digicel and Vodafone.
Solomon Islands	Article 173. (Traffic in obscene publication): 1. Any person who: (a) for the purpose of or by way of trade or for the purpose of distribution or public exhibition, makes, produces or has in his possession any one or more obscene writings, drawings, prints, paintings, printed matter, pictures, posters, emblems, photographs, cinematograph -films or any other objects or any other object tending to corrupt morals [...] : is guilty of a misdemeanour, and is liable, to imprisonment for two years or to a fine of two hundred dollars.		
Tonga	Pornography Control Act 2002 Any person who deals in or carries out any activity pertaining to the production of pornographic material or is otherwise concerned in the production of pornographic material commits an offence and shall be liable upon conviction to a fine not exceeding $10,000 or 3 years imprisonment or both.		
Tuvalu	Article 166 of the Penal Code Any person who — for the purpose of or by way of trade or for the purpose of distribution or public exhibition, makes, produces or has in his possession any one or more obscene writings, drawings, prints, paintings, printed matter, pictures, posters, emblems, photographs, films as defined in the Cinemas and Films or any other obscene objects or any other object tending to corrupt morals; or for any of the purposes above mentioned imports, conveys or exports, or causes to be imported, conveyed or exported, any such matters or things, or in any manner whatsoever puts any of them in circulation; or carries on or takes in any business, whether public or private, concerned with any such matters or things, or deals in any such matters or things in any manner whatsoever, or distributes any of them or exhibit any of them publicly, or makes a business of lending any of them; or advertises or makes known by any means whatsoever with a view to assisting the circulation of, or traffic in, any such matters or things, that a person is engaged in any of the acts referred to in this section, or advertises or makes known how, or from whom, any such matters or things can be produced either directly or indirectly; or publicly exhibits any indecent show or performance or any show or performance tending to corrupt morals, is guilty of a misdemeanour, and shall be liable to imprisonment for 2 years or to a fine of $200.		
Vanuatu	Production of pornography is illegal in Vanuatu.		
Country	Legal texts		

== See also ==
- Legality of child pornography
- Legal status of fictional pornography depicting minors
