= Pornography in Azerbaijan =

Pornography in Azerbaijan is not easily accessible in most parts of the country, but pornographic material is inexpensive and easily obtainable in the capital Baku. According to Article 3 of the Media Act of 1999, "pornographic materials" are defined as works of art, photographic reproductions of paintings, information and other materials the main content of which is the crude and undignified depiction of the anatomical and physiological aspects of sexual relations.

There are reports of bribes being charged for partaking in hardcore pornography across the country's borders. Softcore porn is not usually punishable, but one should take necessary precautions around Azerbaijan's borders because borders guards are always on the lookout to make extra money.

== Child pornography ==
Child pornography is governed by the 1998 Rights of the Child Act, the 1999 Media Act, the Plan of Measures to Solve the Problem of Homeless, and the Street Children and the National Plan of Action to Combat Trafficking in Persons.

== See also ==
- Pornography laws by region
- Legality of child pornography
- Legal status of internet pornography
