= Pornography in Armenia =

All forms of pornography in Armenia is illegal and punishable by up to 7 years in prison, and according to Article 300 of the criminal code, the production and dissemination of pornographic materials such as videos, images, or advertisements by up to 2 years in prison or is punishable by a fine of 500 times the minimum Armenian monthly salary.

Armenia has adopted the UN's Protocol on child pornography.

== See also ==
- Pornography laws by region
- Legality of child pornography
