= Pornography in the Netherlands =

Pornography in the Netherlands has been legal since 1985.

== Current legislation ==
The creation, spreading, broadcasting and ownership of pornography are legal in the Netherlands. Pornography depicting persons under the age of 18, or appearing to depict such persons, is illegal to produce, spread or own under child pornography laws. Bestiality and pornography (appearing to) depict sexual acts with animals are illegal in the Netherlands since 2008.

== Political history ==
The 17th century saw a rise in interest in and production of pornographic literature in the Republic of the Netherlands, including the publication of 'The glorious deeds of John Shit, dedicated to the kackhuys' (De doorluchtige daden van Jan Stront, opgedragen aan het kackhuys) in 1684.

Around 1900, the availability and production of pornography increased due to technological advances in printing and photography. Protestant groups protested the immorality of pornography and called for legislation. On May 20, 1911, the Morality Law (Dutch: Zedelijkheidswet or Wet-Regout, officially Wet van 20 mei 1911 tot bestrijding van de zedeloosheid en beteugeling van de speelzucht) was passed, banning prostitution, trafficking of women, brothels, contraceptives, gambling, abortion, homosexuality and the spreading, creation and display of pornography.

On 9 October 1967, the first public broadcast of nudity on Dutch television took place. Visual artist Phil Bloom sat naked in a chair in Hoepla, a program by VPRO.

In 1968, the first Dutch erotic magazine Chick was launched. In 1970, the magazine was involved in a lawsuit known as the Chick-arrest. Chick won the lawsuit as the Supreme Court ruled the magazine was not 'offensive to decency' (Dutch: aanstotelijk voor de eerbaarheid), paving the way for legal pornography and spawning the creation of other erotic magazines, including Candy, Rosie, Seventeen and Tuk.

In 1972, a public broadcast of the film Deep Throat in a cinema led to the Deep Throat-arrest. The Supreme Court ruled that while the broadcast was illicit, it was not 'offensive to decency', and the movie was permitted to be screened to persons aged 18 or over in theaters that could seat up to 50 people. On February 18, 1977, Cinema Parisien in Amsterdam aired the film in a theater that could seat more than 50 people in order to provoke a test case.

The first law to legalise pornography in the Netherlands was drafted in 1979, which included a lift on the ban on making, spreading or owning pornographic text, images and items. The law sought to amend article 240 of the criminal code (Dutch: wijziging van artikel 240 van het Wetboek van Strafrecht en van enige andere bepalingen). The law took until 1984 to be accepted by the Dutch Parliament, being edited several times in the process, including the last change in 1984 which stated that the ban for child pornographic images would not be lifted. The law came into effect in 1986, after several years in which sexshops had been tolerated.

In October 2002, the legal age for acting and modeling in pornography in the Netherlands was raised from 16 to 18.

In 2019, almost 9 in 10 (89%) known URLs containing child sexual abuse material were hosted in Europe. The Netherlands hosts 71% of the child sexual abuse content found by the IWF. This equates to 93,962 URLs and is an increase from 2018 when the Netherlands was found to be hosting 47% of all known child sexual abuse material.

=== Child pornography legislation in the Netherlands ===
In 2006, the Party for Neighbourly Love, Freedom and Diversity sought to legalise the possession of child pornography, under the condition that it would be approved when the children involved participated voluntarily and were not exploited. The party was disbanded in 2010, after the party had failed to receive the 30 signatures from each of the 19 Dutch electoral regions it would need to get on the ballot for the 2006 and 2010 general elections.

In 2010, new laws were passed to combat child pornography. The new laws made it illegal to click a hyperlink of which is can be expected that it might lead to child pornography, to attempt to meet a child with the intention of making child pornography, and owning any material that realistically depict persons appearing to be underaged, even when the subjects are in fact over 18 or the images have been digitally created or manipulated. Owning material showing 'nudity in a family setting' is not illegal, neither are depictions of cherubs, as the addition of wings deem the images unrealistic. In 2011, the first person was convicted in the Netherlands for the possession of virtual child pornography, which was 'not distinguishable from reality at first glance'. Similar laws came into effect for pornography involving animals. Prior to 2010, producing pornography with animals was not explicitly illegal in the Netherlands.

In 2014, the Supreme Court of the Netherlands ordered the dissolution of Union MARTIJN (Dutch: Vereniging MARTIJN), which had been striving to normalise sexual relations between adults and children and legalise child pornography since 1982.

== Pornography in the media ==
Movies that feature 'explicit sexual acts' and 'details of genitalia' are rated for ages 16 and up by Kijkwijzer, the Dutch motion picture content rating system. Movies with this rating may only be broadcast between 10 p.m. and 6 a.m., and cinemas that allow entry to persons under 16 to these movies are punishable by law.

== See also ==
- Pornography laws by region
