= Det kære legetøj =

- Poster
- Directed by: Gabriel Axel
- Written by: Gabriel Axel
- Produced by: Gabriel Axel
- Starring: Gurli Taschner; Poul Glargaard; Jesper Klein
- Narrated by: Holger Juul Hansen
- Cinematography: Rolf Rønne
- Edited by: Edith Nisted Nielsen
- Music by: Bertrand Bech
- Release date: 29 July 1968
- Running time: 91 minutes
- Country: Denmark
- Language: Danish

Det kære legetøj (The Dear Toy, also known as Danish Blue and Sex and the Law) is a 1968 Danish documentary film directed by Gabriel Axel that advocates for the legalization of pornography.

A campaigning film, it mixes interviews, reconstructions and fiction in playful fashion, seeking to ridicule and undermine Denmark's censorship laws at the time. The film may be said to have been successful in its objective, as a year after its release Denmark completely legalized pornography.

The film was banned in both France and the United Kingdom, though the ban in the latter country was overturned by the watch committee in Hartlepool and the British Board of Film Censors eventually granted the film an X rating with cuts in 1977. The film was also released in the United States and started a whole wave of documentary films about pornography in Denmark.

== Cast ==
- Birgit Brüel
- Henrik Wiehe
- Aage Fønss
- Susanne Jagd
- Eddie Karnil
- Arne Hansen
- Kirsten Norholt
- Hardy Rafn
- Per Pallesen
- Poul Glargaard
- Jesper Klein
