= Pornography in Bhutan =

The law in Bhutan prohibits the consumption or distribution of pornography. It is defined in Section 476 (A) of the Bhutan Penal Code of 2004, which states, "A defendant shall be guilty of the offence of computer pornography if the defendant publishes and distributes an obscene photography or picture on the computer or over the internet."

== Types of publication ==
=== Internet ===
Social messaging app WeChat has popularised pornography in Bhutan.

== Convicted cases ==
The Royal Bhutan Police registered seventeen cases of computer pornography between 2007 and 2019.

On 13 April 2018, two women were convicted for pornography for taking nude photographs of their friend while asleep from being drunk and posting them on WeChat. On 14 May, the court sentenced the girl who took the picture and posted it on WeChat. She was detained for 14 days after her arrest and had to pay 43,250 ngultrum in lieu of her original serving period of nearly a year. The other girl who told her to take the photo was sentenced to six months in prison, but was also detained for 14 days so she paid 20,750 ngultrum instead.

== See also ==
- Pornography laws by region
- Legality of child pornography
- Legal status of internet pornography
