= Pornography in North Korea =

North Korea strictly forbids the possession, production, distribution and importation of pornography, with severe penalties enforced by the government. Nevertheless, pornography is widespread in the country because people secretly import it, or locally produce it.

The possession of it first became popular amongst elites during the late 1990s, when Kim Jong Il was the leader of the country. High ranking political and military officials were the most active consumers of pornography. Today, pornography is sold openly on the China–North Korea border despite the government's attempts to curtail circulation. Most of the content consumed in North Korea is produced outside the country, with a significant part of it being Chinese bootleg recordings of poor quality. A locally produced pornographic film typically involves nude or scantily clad women dancing to music.

== Habits ==
Sexuality is restricted in the conservative North Korean culture. Some defectors say that the lack of sex education in the country results in young people learning about sex through pornography, and also that adults watch less pornography than young people. Showing an interest in pornography may make one subject to the country's mass surveillance network.

Pornographic magazines and films sold at black markets are distributed as CDs called "Sex-R" (sex CD-R) and are arranged by video quality, which is mostly poor due to most of them being cheap bootleg recordings from China. Markets and distribution methods continue to develop. Unauthorized sale of pornography takes place, for instance, at the Tongil Market of Pyongyang. On the China–North Korea border pornography is traded in the open. Exposure to Chinese pornography has also increased the number of abortions.

In the past, pornographic videos were also made in North Korea. They began to appear during the leadership of Kim Jong Il, who himself reportedly had a significant collection of pornographic films. Domestic titles were usually immediately seized by the authorities. North Korea has also exported pornography in an effort to gain hard currency. Some of these efforts were through North Korean websites.

Watching pornography became widespread among the country's elites in the late 1990s. Thereafter, the practice has spread to other societal strata as well. Domestic pornographic works usually feature nude or bikini-wearing North Korean women dancing to music. The Literature and Art Publishing Company secretly published a pornographic book, Licentious Stories, for the use of party officials. In 2000, the Korean Central Broadcasting Committee also published a pornographic videotape for officials. Imported pornography has nowadays largely replaced domestic pornography. Political and army elites are the most active consumers of pornography. In 2007 renting a CD for one hour cost 2,000 North Korean won. In 1995, a pornographic film could be sold for as much as 80 dollars. In recent years, prices have fallen dramatically due to increased supply, with one Chinese smuggler stating he regularly hands out porn for free for customers who buy pirated K-dramas.

South Korean pornographic films are smuggled into the country. Propaganda balloons sent from South Korea to the North have featured sexually explicit material to appeal to North Korean soldiers, too. Henry A. Crumpton, a veteran of the Central Intelligence Agency's Directorate of Operations, explains that he has "never met a North Korean diplomat who did not want porn, either for personal use or resale."

When North Korea sent troops to fight alongside the Russians against Ukraine in October 2024, it was reported that the Koreans were taking advantage of the superior internet service away from home by "gorging on pornography".

== Law ==
According to the Criminal Law of the Democratic People's Republic of Korea:

A person who, without authorization, imports, makes, distributes or illegally keeps music, dance, drawings, photos, books, video recordings or electronic media that reflects decadent, carnal or foul contents shall be punished by short term labour for less than two years. In cases where the person commits a grave offence, he or she shall be punished by reform through labour for less than five years. In cases where such a person imports, keeps or distributes sexual video recordings, the punishment shall be reform through labour for more than five years and less than ten years.

— Article 193 (Import, Keeping and Distribution of Decadent Culture), Chapter 6 (Crimes of Impairing Socialist Culture)

The law specifies that viewing such material is also illegal:

A person who watches or listens to music, dance, drawings, photos, books, video recordings or electronic media that reflects decadent, carnal or foul contents or who performs such acts himself or herself shall be punished by short term labour for less than two years. In cases where the person commits a grave offence, he or she shall be punished by reform through labour for less than five years.

— Article 194 (Conduct of Decadent Acts)

The State Security Department is tasked with monitoring illegal imports of pornographic materials. Involvement in illegal import results in the culprit being shot or sent to a kyohwaso (re-education camp) for 10 to 15 years. Executions of several persons accused of watching or distributing pornography took place in late 2013. It is illegal for tourists to bring pornography into the country. Access to "sex and adult websites" on the Internet has been blocked from the country, but in the past BitTorrent downloads of pornography have been detected, likely relating to foreigners residing in Pyongyang. Likewise, North Koreans living near the border with China use mobile phones equipped with Chinese SIM cards to access Chinese porn sites.

When Kim Jong Un's uncle Jang Song-thaek was executed in 2013, distributing pornography was counted among his crimes.

North Korea has ratified the Optional Protocol on the Sale of Children, Child Prostitution and Child Pornography of the Convention on the Rights of the Child, but has enacted no legislation specific to child pornography.

== See also ==
- Pornography laws by region
- Legality of child pornography
- Censorship in North Korea
- Internet in North Korea
- LGBT rights in North Korea
- North Korea's illicit activities
