= Poul Glargaard =

Danish actor (1942–2011)

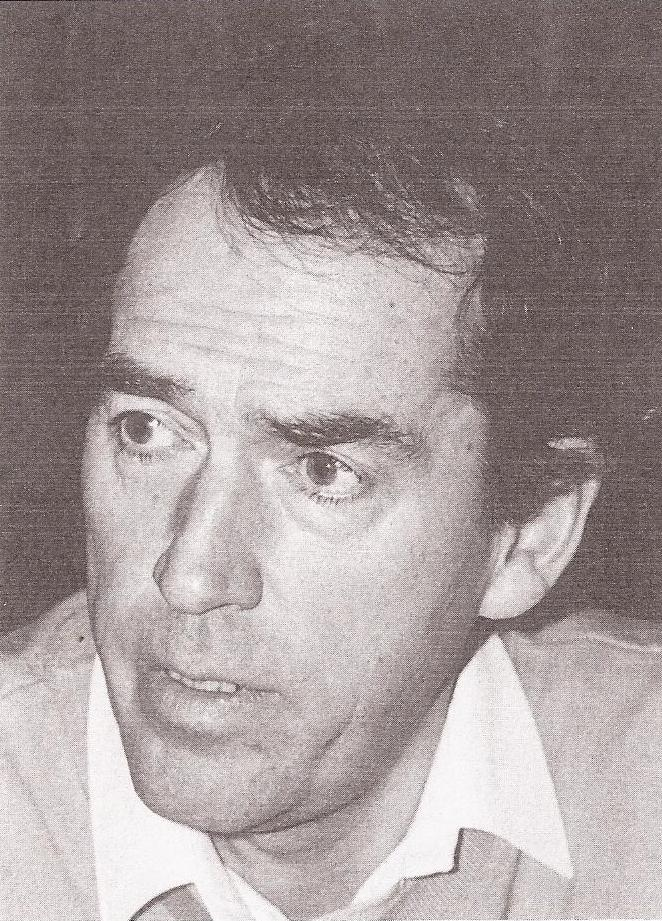
- Born: 11 April 1942; Randers, Denmark
- Died: 17 October 2011 (aged 69); Frederiksberg, Denmark
- Occupation: Actor

Poul Glargaard, born Rasmussen (11 April 1942 – 17 October 2011) was a Danish actor. He joined the Aarhus Theater in 1966 and the Aalborg Theater later, entering film in 1968. He has also appeared in numerous TV programmes in Denmark. He was also a successful comedian and entertainer, and dubber. Many audio-dramas (for instance Star Wars and several children's horror stories) voiced by him and originally released in the 1980s and 1990s remain popular to this day. Some of his movies have reached cult status, but they only became popular after his death.

== Filmography ==
- Det er så synd for farmand – 1968
- Magic in Town – 1968
- Det kære legetøj – 1968
- The Veterinarian's Adopted Children – 1968
- Trekanter – 1969
- Ta' lidt solskin – 1969
- Ballad of Carl-Henning – 1969
- Rend mig i revolutionen – 1970
- The Olsen Gang's Big Score – 1972
- The Olsen Gang Goes Crazy – 1973
- Strømer – 1976
- I skyttens tegn – 1978
- Jul i Gammelby – 1979
- In the Middle of the Night – 1984
- Hvordan vi slipper af med de andre – 2007
