= Pornography in Albania =

Pornography in Albania is not restricted. It is only illegal for producing, delivering, advertising, importing, selling and publishing pornographic material under the age of 18. Child pornography is prohibited, but Albania has failed to adopt laws against the publishing, manufacturing, accessing, dissemination and the expansion of child pornography. Internet pornography is legal.

== Legality ==
Article 117 of Albania's Criminal Code states that people who distribute and/or publish child pornography can be fined or sent to jail for two years.

The government has been taking measures in protecting children from sex exploitation.

== Demographics ==
About 40% of the Albanian population are below the age of 25, and approximately 750,000 children are under 14 years of age. Children are vulnerable to commercial sexual exploitation due to lack of awareness and education, minority discrimination, reoccurring domestic violence and child marriage practices, and the position of women in Albania. being subordinate to men. Child trafficking is a concern; children, especially girls, are trafficked.

Young children can easily access pornography online, and parental control apps are limited in Albania. Nearly half of children watch porn daily, with Facebook being one of the most common websites for children to view porn.

== Types of publication ==
Child pornography is usually accessed through mobile phones, and distribution of pornographic materials is usually via Bluetooth. Internet usage has been increasingly common, but Albania has been behind in promoting awareness of child internet safety and only recently the education system is now promoting awareness and giving information on internet safety in schools.

== See also ==
- Pornography laws by region
- Legality of child pornography
