= Pornography in Turkey =

Pornography in Turkey has been produced since the 1970s. In fact, Turkey remains just one of two Middle Eastern countries (or Middle Eastern adjacent countries) where porn is not banned outright, including Israel – access to pornographic sites in Turkey is blocked. According to a presentation on the "conscious use of the Internet and secure Internet service," made by the Telecommunications Department (TIB) of the Turkish Parliament, 2 million online users watch pornographic films each month in Turkey.

== History ==
After a long period of producing Italian-inspired softcore comedies in the 1970s, the hardcore film Öyle Bir Kadın Ki was distributed in 1979.

Many more followed prior to the 1980 coup d'état, when the government strictly prohibited graphic sex in cinema. In the late 1990s, Turkish pornography experienced a minor renaissance, producing cheap, low quality material. Modern producers of Turkish porn are centered in Germany, though they still recruit their performers from Turkey.

== Legal status ==
Production of pornography is legal in Turkey. However, the Turkish Penal Code imposes some restrictions. In addition to prohibiting child pornography, it also states:

226/4: Any person who produces audio-visual or written material containing sexual intercourse by using violence, or with animals, or body of a dead person, or performed in an unnatural manner; or engages in import, sale, transportation, storage of these materials or presents such material to other's use, is punished with imprisonment from one year to four years.

Courts have interpreted the unnatural manner clause broadly, sometimes including oral sex and anal sex in that definition. The article 226/7 provides exemptions for scientific works; and with the exception of child pornography, to works that have literary or artistic value.

Further, regarding the broadcasting of pornographic materials, the Turkish Penal Code states:

226/2: A person who broadcasts or publishes obscene images, printed or audio material or who acts as an intermediary for this purpose shall be sentenced to imprisonment for a term of six months to three years.

In May 2006, the government banned the four erotic television channels only from the Turkish satellite provider, Digiturk. The channels were: Playboy TV, Exotica TV, Adult Channel, and Rouge TV. The ban was instituted by the Radio and Television High Council. Yet Turkish people did access of banned websites through VPN. On 9 August 2008, Edibe Sözen, an AKP MP, introduced a bill to ban the sales of pornographic images to anyone under the age of 16. The proposed bill also included a provision that anyone over the age of 16 purchasing such materials would be registered in a database via a Citizen Identification Number. The bill didn't become a law.
