= Pornography in Denmark =

The first country in the world to legitimize pornography, both literary and pictorial, was Denmark in 1967 and 1969, respectively. That year, the country legalized pornographic literature. In 1968, the campaigning feature film Danish Blue advocated the complete legalization of pornography. The film was banned in France but released in both England and the United States. It started a whole wave of documentary films about pornography in Denmark. Subsequently, on July 1, 1969, Denmark became the first nation in the world to legalize pictorial and audiovisual pornography, which helped further promote the Golden Age of Porn (1969–1984) in modern American culture, and later, in many other countries throughout the world.

People in Denmark have had free access to such materials ever since. There still are a few regulations: for example, pornography must be placed out of the view of children, and may not be sold to persons under the age of 15. The public TV channel Kanal København broadcast hardcore pornography free and uncoded at night in the early 2000s.

In 2006, the Danish Road Safety Council launched a campaign against speeding featuring topless women who were holding speed limit signs next to roads in an attempt to get the attention of young male drivers. According to Julia Pauli from the council, reactions were mostly positive and the campaign was effective for said target group, with over 50% saying that they were thinking more about the dangers of speeding when driving.

Prior to 2015, there were no specific restrictions against zoophilic pornography, and such affairs came under animal cruelty laws. If no harm or pain was inflicted on the animal, such acts were not illegal. This changed in late April 2015, when Denmark passed a new law, making sex with animals illegal. The earlier lack of legislation had allegedly made Denmark a center for the production of animal pornography. This accusation, however, was dismissed as a myth by Det Dyreetiske Råd, a legal council, which, in November 2006, published an extensive report on the topic of animal sex.

Between 1969 and 1980, the Color Climax Corporation produced legal child pornography films. Since 1980, child pornography has been illegal in Denmark. It is illegal to distribute photographic or video pornography of persons under the age of 18, although the age of consent in Denmark is 15.

== See also ==
- Nordic sexual morality debate
