= Pornography in Bulgaria =

The production and distribution of pornography in Bulgaria is illegal. Pornography films and online distribution of sexual content are illegal. Bulgaria lacks pornographic production companies. However, people are allowed to watch and download pornographic videos, they just cannot sell or create pornography. Accessing, possessing or storing pornographic materials is not illegal, with the exception of child pornography.

== History ==
In the former People's Republic of Bulgaria, pornography was only available to a comparatively limited number of people. Pornographic materials such as magazines and videocassettes were smuggled into the country. The abandonment of censorship in the early post-communist period resulted in pornography becoming widely available. In the early 1990s when the communist state dissolved, pornographic magazines were sold at newsstands, pirated foreign pornographic videocassettes became available and foreign pornographic television stations were accessible. The first Bulgarian pornographic film was made in 1992.

The penalty for production or distribution of pornography is up to one year of imprisonment (or two years if the offender used the internet) and a fine of 1,000 leva to 3,000 leva. The penalty for distribution or possession of child pornography is up to one year imprisonment or a fine of up to 2,000 leva. Authorities tolerate illegal distribution of hardcore porn in designated shops and on TV after 11 p.m. Softcore material is rarely censored. Magazines and pornographic papers have become increasingly available since the fall of communism in 1989 and local editions of many international porn magazines are published. Society is often exposed to sexual content in advertising.

== Convictions ==
In 2010, two Dutch men were arrested for distributing pornography online, which involved police detaining a 19-year-old female Bulgarian citizen.

In 2011, twenty men were arrested nationwide for child pornography. Police had captured a plethora of pornographic videos (including one on Skype) featuring "extremely repulsing sexual profanities" with children aged 2–11.

== See also ==
- Pornography laws by region
- Legal status of internet pornography
- The Fall of Communism as Seen in Gay Pornography
