= Pornography in Cyprus =

Pornography in Cyprus is legal with restrictions. Selling pornographic material to people under 18 years old is illegal. Child pornography is a crime and is strictly prohibited.

Law enforcement agencies and local police frequently monitor internet activity where crime like child pornography most often occurs. Law enforcement can gather information from one's computer or identify subscriber information based on one's IP address. If someone is convicted of accessing, possessing or distributing child pornography, the only sentence available is a jail sentence according to Act 22 (III) / 2004, on the Law against Internet Crime. The serving time depends on the type of crime the offender commits.

Cyprus has been called the hub of pornography, due to the fact that major porn companies are headquartered in Cyprus, especially Pornhub and xHamster.

== Convicted cases ==
People viewing pornography is very common in Cyprus, especially through the internet. Many people have been getting into trouble with the law for illegal child pornography. Many reports have been filed.

On 16 January 2020, a former high school security guard in Nicosia who is now fired for child pornography, was jailed for 4 years after he admitted to child sexploitation and child pornography possession. He is banned from working at that high school and interacting with the students. He was previously arrested in October 2019 for convincing four teenagers to send photos of them engaging in sexual acts on Facebook.

On 2 March 2020, a 42-year-old man was remanded for 8 days on Monday for possessing child pornography and sexual exploitation.

On 21 April 2020, a 24-year-old was sent to prison for sending images of child porn to another person.
