= Same-sex pornography =

Same-sex pornography or homosexual pornography may refer to:

- Gay pornography
- Lesbian pornography
