= Pornography in Estonia =

Pornography in Estonia is legal, but the distribution and exhibition of works deemed to contain pornography are regulated by law.

== Definition ==
Pornography is regulated by the Act to Regulate Dissemination of Works which Contain Pornography or Promote Violence or Cruelty (adopted by the Riigikogu on 16 December 1997, effective from 1 May 1998, last amended on 1 January 2015). Under the Act, "pornography" is defined as 'a manner of representation in which sexual acts are brought to the foreground in a vulgar and intrusive manner and other human relations are disregarded or relegated to the background'. (Note: Authentic text in Estonian: 'pornograafia – selline kujutamisviis, mis teisi inimlikke seoseid kõrvale või tahaplaanile jättes seksuaalsed toimingud labaselt ja pealetükkivalt esiplaanile toob'.) Thus defined, "works which contain pornography" have the same legal status as works which "promote violence or cruelty", and both concepts are always mentioned together throughout the Act. Both real and fictional, including drawn or written word mediums are regulated under the same laws.

== Distribution and exhibition ==
The only places where "works which contain pornography or promote violence or cruelty" may be disseminated or exhibited, provided that they have obtained a licence for it, are called "specialised places of business", and include "shops, cinemas, video theatres or on the premises of other places of business". Minors are not allowed to enter these businesses, which are responsible for preventing minors from entering them, and required to display a sign "prohibited to minors". When works are distributed outside the specialised places of business, it must be ensured that minors cannot see or examine their contents.

If a business does not comply with any of these regulations, they can be fined or have their licence revoked. If it is unclear whether the work in question "contains pornography or promotes violence or cruelty", a business has the right to have an expert committee review the contents in order to determine whether they fall under the definitions of the Act, and thus need to comply to the regulations or not.
