= Pornography in the Czech Republic =

Pornography legalisation in the Czech Republic started in 1989 following the Velvet Revolution, when the country went from being communist to being a liberal democracy. The possession, manufacturing, and distribution of child pornography is illegal in the Czech Republic and is punishable by up to 8 years in prison. Possession of child pornography was made illegal in 2007 and carries a penalty of up to 2 years in prison. According to the Czech penal code, sale and distribution of pornography depicting violence among people or sexual intercourse with animals is banned with a penalty of up to 1 year in prison.

The Czech Republic has one of the largest pornography industries in the world. This includes a large gay pornography industry. Prague has been nicknamed the "Porn Capital of Europe". XVideos, the second-most popular pornographic website in the world, is headquartered in Prague.

Some of the most famous Czech adult film stars includes Silvia Saint, Lea De Mae, Little Caprice, Tarra White, Laura Lion, Paula Wild, Monica Sweetheart, Nessa Devil, Daniella Rush or Stacy Silver.

== See also ==
- The Fall of Communism as Seen in Gay Pornography
