= Pornography in Finland =

Certain types of pornography in Finland are illegal; this also includes child pornography. Pornographic material which are violent and bestial are banned. Selling pornographical material in any store is legal, but softcore magazines may not be sold to buyers under 15, and hardcore pornography is restricted to buyers aged 18 and above.

Prior to 1 January 1999, all indecent publishing, including the import and export thereof, was banned. This law was not interpreted as prohibiting the sale of porn magazines but some restrictions for the sold material prevailed.

Video law which was effective from 1987 to 2000 forbade the selling of adult-only videos effectively banning all the pornographic videos. This law was not applied very strictly but at times it led to police crackdowns to erotic stores.

== Child pornography ==
Under Finnish law, it is illegal to possess, produce or distribute child pornography. Possession of child pornography is punishable by fine or imprisonment of 1 year while production or distribution of child pornography is punishable by fine or 2 years imprisonment.

"Aggravated" distribution of child pornography depicting a child whom is (1) particularly young, (2) also subject to violence or particularly humiliating treatment, (3) the offence is committed in a particularly methodical manner or (4) the offence has been committed in the framework of a criminal organization; and is punishable by up to 6 years imprisonment.

Fictional child pornography including fantasy cartoon child pornography is allowed in Finland.
