= Pornography in Belarus =

In Belarus, production, distribution, promotion, exhibition as well as possession with intent of distribution or promotion of pornographic materials or objects of pornographic nature is punishable by Belarusian criminal law and results in fine, compulsory community service, or up to 4 years in prison.

Simple possession of child pornography is legal, but the production and distribution of pornographic materials depicting a minor is illegal and punishable by up to 13 years in prison.

Activity in the pornography industry have become more popular in recent years, and pornography producers had little trouble making money. Belarusian pornographers work inside and outside Belarus. In 2012, authorities began cracking down on pornography producers and distributors. Along with law enforcers, the education, culture and health care officials helped combating the distribution of youth pornography for a week in August 2012. The police search for pornography on mobile phones of schoolchildren to trace pornography producers and distributors. Pornography had been a profitable business in Belarus until recently, when authorities started tracking them. 157 cases have been reported in 2009, and 136 in the first half of 2012.

In November 2012, a 21-year-old Belarusian man was sentenced for 4 years in prison after publishing 8 pornographic videos on his social media page.
