= Pornography in the Maldives =

In Maldives, the production, possession, sale, dissemination, distribution, or importation of pornography or pornographic material (including sex toys) is illegal. It is considered a form of criticizing Islam.

== Types of publications ==
=== Print ===
Possession of publications containing sexually explicit images carry a 6-month jail sentence and a fine. Erotic novels are not considered pornography.

=== Internet ===
Websites considered 'anti-Islamic' or 'pornographic' content are sometimes blocked by the Communications Authority of the Maldives (CAM) on the request of the Ministry of Islamic Affairs. In 2015, the Prosecutor General of the Maldives, Muhuthaz Muhusin, considered blocking all pornographic websites asserting that 'viewing pornographic material may lead to criminal activities' and that accessing such content is 'against Islamic principles.' Similar assertions were made by the Home Minister in 2016. However, no such steps were taken.

As of May 2019, several pornographic websites feature in the top 50 most popular websites in the Maldives.

In 2023, as part of a pledge made by president Mohamed Muizzu, the Maldivian government banned all pornographic websites.
