= Pornography in Belgium =

Pornography in Belgium is legal. Pornographic products, mainly magazines and DVDs, are typically imported into the country from France, Germany, the Netherlands, or from North America. Possession, production and distribution of child pornography is illegal in and is enforced by authorities. Possessing child pornography can result to up to 1 year in prison, and producing or distributing child pornography is punishable by up to 15 years in prison. The law permits the prosecution of residents who commit such crimes while abroad.

== Convicted cases ==
In April 2020, four men were sentenced to prison – ranging between 5 and 16 years – for major child pornography cases. One of the individuals was caught hoarding over 9,000,000 images and 15 terabytes of child pornography. The investigation began about 5 years prior, when a Belgian man was taking pictures of children in bathing suits on a beach in Blankenberge, West Flanders which caught the attention of a Belgian police officer. Until recently, 110 victims including mostly male children and babies were identified, along with 90 suspects. According to federal police, this was "one of the biggest cases of sexual abuse of minors ever known" in Belgium.
