= Pornography in Croatia =

Pornography in Croatia is legal, but restrictions apply. Hardcore pornography material cannot be sold to persons under 18. Distribution, production or possession of child pornography is illegal and punishable by a maximum of 10 years imprisonment. An adult intentionally exposing children to pornography (including adult porn) may result in fines or a sentence of up to 1 year in prison.

== Media ==
In 2015, sociologists from the University of Western Ontario and the University of Zagreb conducted researches in which pornography doesn't necessarily cause harm to young people. A psychologist from the Child and Youth Protection Center of Zagreb, however, stated that explicit materials can be linked to child abuse that may leave PTSD. The key point is that pornography itself isn't harmful unless violence or abuse is involved.

A research was conducted in which the use of pornography was associated with both higher levels of self-esteem, but symptoms of depression and anxiety were higher. Among female students, the more down they felt, the more likely they used pornography.

Technology has increased the use of pornography materials online causing people, including minors, to be exposed. One survey in Croatia showed that at least 27% of internet users between ages 10 and 16 were exposed to pornography at least once, and the average age of minors being introduced to pornography was 12.5 years. According to one research sample, 88% of boys and 66% of girls used mobile devices to access pornography.

== Pornography and masturbation ==
In 2011, in a subsample of 416 female survey participants, 60% of young women between 18 and 25 reported that they masturbate. Women between 22 and 25 were more likely to report masturbation compared with the former. Those who viewed pornography were more likely to masturbate.
