= Unsimulated sex =

Sex scenes in which actors genuinely perform sex acts

In the film industry, unsimulated sex is the presentation of sex scenes in which actors genuinely perform the depicted sex acts instead of simulating them. While ubiquitous in pornographic films, unsimulated sex scenes are uncommon in other types of film.

== History ==
In the first half of the 20th century, sex and nudity in film was restricted by law and also by self-imposed industry standards such as the Motion Picture Production Code. Films showing explicit sexual activity were confined to privately distributed underground films such as stag films or "porn loops". In the 1960s and 70s, social attitudes toward sexuality liberalized and sexually explicit material was decriminalized in several countries.

In 1969, Andy Warhol's Blue Movie started the Golden Age of Pornography and also inspired filmmakers to include scenes of hardcore sex in non-pornographic stories. Notable examples include two of the eight Bedside-films and the six Zodiac-films, all of which contained hardcore sex scenes but had mainstream casts and crews and premiered in mainstream theaters.

Since the late 1970s, the number of films with hardcore sex scenes scenes has declined, but the controversy surrounding Lars von Trier's The Idiots in 1998 inspired a wave of art-house films depicting unsimulated sexual activity, such as Romance (1999), Baise-moi (2000), Intimacy (2001), The Brown Bunny (2003), and 9 Songs (2004).

== Prosthesis ==
The use of prostheses has blurred the line between what could be classified as simulated and unsimulated sexual activity due to the fact that stimulation of genitals by an inanimate object could still be perceived as genuine sexual activity. In the context of filming, the use of prosthesis is to prevent genital contact between the cast members and therefore falls under the category of simulated.

== Notable filmmakers ==
=== Catherine Breillat ===
Catherine Breillat is a French director, screenwriter, and novelist whose films have a focus on female sexuality, in particular the transition between female adolescence and adulthood. Her sex scenes are known for being shot in long takes.

=== Joe D'Amato ===
Joe D'Amato was the pseudonym of Aristide Massaccesi. Massaccesi wrote and directed films several genres but is best known for horror and erotic films, most notably the Black Emanuelle series, Erotic Nights of the Living Dead, and Porno Holocaust.

=== Derek Ford ===
Derek Ford was a British director and screenwriter known for producing sexploitation films for which hardcore footage was made for foreign releases. Most of this "continental" footage was filmed with non-actors.

=== Jess Franco ===
Jess Franco was a Spanish screenwriter, director, and actor who made films across numerous genres but is best known for his horror and erotic films which incorporated surrealist elements.

=== Radley Metzger ===
Radley Metzger was an American editor and film distributor who directed hardcore and softcore films under the pseudonym of "Henry Paris."

=== Gaspar Noé ===
Gaspar Noé is an Argentine-born French director who is best known for the New French Extremity, depicting sex and/or violence in an uninhibeted and violent way. Sexually, this manifests itself as long takes of unsimulated sex (with the exception of the ten minute rape scene at the beginning of Irréversible, which was simulated).

=== Lars von Trier ===
Lars von Trier is a Danish writer and director who co-created the Dogme 95 movement which emphasizes on-location shooting and minimal special effects and also wrote the "Depression" trilogy, two films of which (Antichrist and Nymphomaniac) use sexuality to explore the characters' emotions.

== Rationales ==
In an interview after the release of his film Love (2015), when asked why audiences want to see real sex in film, Gaspar Noé suggested it is about power structures:

“It’s the whole structure of power,” he says. “In most societies whether they’re western or not, people want to control the sexual behaviour or to organise it in a precise context. Sex is like a danger zone. Sometimes class barriers fall down and it scares a lot of people. It’s about states controlling their systems, like religion.”

James Franco has cited "aesthetics and personal reasons" for working on Interior. Leather Bar. (2013):

I've been a part of professional mainstream film for 17 years, and then in addition to that, I am a citizen of the United States and, you know, I am engaged with its mainstream culture, but I've also done a fair amount of studying queer theory or queer cinema classes. So I've found that my place, one thing that my position allows, is a way to bring these two worlds together and also question the rules of mainstream cinema or mainstream culture, to examine why things are made the way that they are, why some subject matter is presented in one way and not another, and how those things shape us as people, how it shapes our beliefs, how it shapes the way that we live. If we can question those things or introduce alternative ways of viewing lifestyles or whatever it might be in mainstream cinema or indie cinema or art cinema, I think it can only be for the good. If other voices or other kinds of discussions or storylines or narratives from different perspectives are introduced, it will only make us richer as a people.

== Production issues ==
A few directors have openly discussed or written about the technical problems inherent in filming of sexual acts, particularly with actors or actresses who have never performed such acts on film. In an interview with BlackBook, Gaspar Noé acknowledges that it is difficult for several reasons: an actor may not be able to get or maintain an erection in the presence of even a small crew, or on camera; either of the participants may have a current partner. "So I've decided that the best way to show real sex is to cast two single people who used to be a couple."

== In film ==
=== Hardcore inserts and body doubles ===
Unsimulated sex acts performed by body doubles and then inserted into scenes of simulated sex between the main actors.

Film Title	Release Year	Scenes(s) depicted	Language(s)
99 Women	1969	According to Stephen Thrower's book Murderous Passions: The Delirious Cinema of Jesús Franco, there are four different versions of this film, including the director's cut and a 1974 French hardcore version featuring roughly eight minutes of hardcore footage filmed by Claude Sendron. Both versions are available on DVD by Another World Entertainment.	English
Bacchanale	1970	Contains hardcore inserts.	English
Groupie Girl	1970	This Derek Ford film was released as a softcore film. In 1974, hardcore inserts were added to the French version. In 2024, seventeen minutes of additional hardcore footage was discovered.	English
The Deviates	1970	Originally released as a softcore film and later re-released with additional hardcore scenes involving pornographic actor Harry Reems.	English
Slaughter Hotel	1971	The French version of this film, entitled Les insatisfaites poupées érotiques du docteur Hitchcock contains hardcore inserts depicting female genitalia and lesbian intercourse.	Italian
A Lizard in a Woman's Skin	1971	There are three French versions of this film: Carole (the original version released in 1971), and two versions released in 1976: Le venin de la peur (renamed original version) and the version with hardcore inserts under the title Les salopes vont en enfer.	Italian
Secret Rites	1971	A British pseudo-documentary film by Derek Ford containing hardcore sex scenes in its export version.	English
Who Killed the Prosecutor and Why?	1972	A version made for foreign market contains hardcore inserts. These scenes are available as a part of deleted scenes presented in CineKult DVD.	Italian
So Sweet, So Dead	1972	A version released in the USA under the title Penetration contains hardcore inserts.	Italian
Commuter Husbands	1972	This Derek Ford film exists in a version with hardcore inserts, but there is no suggestion that any of the credited cast did hardcore scenes.	English
The Red Headed Corpse	1972	There are several versions of this film including a version containing hardcore inserts released on French VHS).	Italian
Ingrid sulla strada (Ingrid the Streetwalker)	1973	There are two versions of this film; a softcore version released in Italy and a hardcore version released later in France with hardcore inserts. According to the source, the film was never released on home video.	Italian
Thriller – A Cruel Picture	1973	Contains hardcore sex scenes performed by body doubles. Synapse Films released two versions of Thriller on DVD; Thriller: They Call Her One-Eye is the softcore version and Thriller – A Cruel Picture contains sex scenes performd by body doubles.	Swedish
Sinner: The Secret Diary of a Nymphomaniac (Le Journal intime d'une nymphomane)	1973	Released in June 1973 in France and then re-released with hardcore inserts in 1977 under the title Les Inassouvies ("The Unsatisfied"). There are both DVD and Blu-ray releases of the film.	French
Anita: Swedish Nymphet	1973	Released in two versions; a softcore version released in Sweden in 1973 and a hardcore in the United States in 1975 under the title Anita, Swedish Nymphette).	Swedish
The Sex Thief	1973	There is a hardcore version of this British film made for export, although there is no suggestion that any of the credited cast performed hardcore scenes.	English
The Porn Brokers	1973	A British pseudo-documentary film containing hardcore footage in its export version.	English
The Other Side of the Mirror (Al otro lado del espejo, Le Miroir obscène, Al otro lado del espejo)	1973	This Jess Franco film exists in at least five variations, including three different softcore versions (two Spanish and one French) and two different hardcore versions (one French and one Italian).	Spanish
A Virgin Among the Living Dead	1973	This Jess Franco film exists in several hardcore and edited variations.	French
The Sinful Dwarf	1973	The Blu-ray release by Severin Films contains both the unrated US theatrical version under the re-release title The Abducted Bride and the original Danish version The Dwarf containing hardcore inserts'.	English
The Eerie Midnight Horror Show	1974	Originally released in Italy in 1974 as a softcore film) and re-released in the United States under the title Sexorcist Devil with hardcore inserts).	Italian
Zelda	1974	For the French version, director Alberto Cavallone shot additional hardcore scenes.	Italian
Riot in a Women's Prison (Prigione di donne)	1974	Released in France under the title Penitencier de femmes perverses and featuring additional hardcore scenes added by the French distributor.	Italian, English
The Girls of Kamare	1974	This Situationist film by René Viénet was edited from the Japanese Pink film Terrifying Girls' High School: Lynch Law Classroom. The scene of a handjob was inserted by Viénet.	Japanese
Countess Perverse (La Comtesse perverse)	1974	This film has been released in at least four different variations, including: the director's cut, two French versions (one theatrical "semi-hardcore" version entitled Les Croqueuses, and one hardcore, released on SECAM videocassette as LA COMTESSE PERVERSE although it may also have played theatrically) and one different Italian hardcore version entitled Sexy Nature. Mondo Macabro contains the original director's cut and the Les Croqueuses version under the Sexy Nature title.	French
Carnal Revenge (Carnalità)	1974	At least two versions of this film were released theatrically; the original version released in Italy in 1974 and a hardcore version released in France in 1975, with hardcore sex scenes added by French distributor.	Italian
Keep It Up, Jack	1974	This British sex comedy film directed by Derek Ford contains hardcore inserts in its export version. There is no suggestion that any of the credited cast did hardcore scenes.	English
The Hot Girls	1974	This British film by John Lindsay contains hardcore inserts in its export version. It is unknown if the credited cast performed in the hardcore sequences.	English
Nude for Satan	1974	This film comes in both the Original Version (softcore, released theatrically in late 1974 in Italy) and Hardcore Version (inserts, with a body double for Rita Calderoni) available in a Dutch DVD.	Italian
The Teenage Prostitution Racket (Storie di vita e malavita)	1975	Directed by Carlo Lizzani and Mino Giarda (also a co-writer); available in many different versions, including a version with 10 minutes of additional hardcore footage, shot by Giarda; this version may be found on Italian Raro Blu-ray released in 2018.	Italian
Black Emanuelle	1975	This film exists in both softcore and hardcore variations. The hardcore sex scenes were performed by body doubles. In Italy, it was released on DVD by Stormovie with the fully uncut hardcore print.	Italian
Emanuelle's Revenge	1975	A German version of this film is titled Die Lady Mit der Pussycat and contains hardcore footage performed by French pornographic actress Brigitte Lahaie.	Italian
Felicia (Les mille et une perversions de Felicia)	1975	Originally shot as a softcore film. Following creation of the X classification, producer Max Pécas was compelled to add hardcore footage.	French
Rêves pornos (Le Dictionnaire de l'érotisme)	1975	Rêves pornos is a compilation of scenes from erotic movies shot by Max Pécas between 1965 and 1974 with additional hardcore sequences. The scenes are taken from movies such as la Nuit la plus chaude, Je suis une nymphomane, Comment le désir vient aux filles and some others from that period.	French
Wham! Bam! Thank You, Spaceman!	1975	This film exists in both softcore and hardcore variations. The hardcore scenes were performed by body doubles.	English
Girls Come First	1975	There is an export version of this Scottish film containing hardcore inserts.	English
The Sexplorer	1975	This Derek Ford film contains hardcore inserts for its export version.	English
Around the World in 80 Beds (In 80 Betten um die Welt, Mondo Erotico)	1976	A hardcore version of this Jess Franco exists. However, the authenticity of the film as a "real" mondo is highly debated (according to the sources).	German
Keep It Up Downstairs	1976	An export version of this British film contains hardcore sex scenes performed by body doubles.	English
Shining Sex	1976	There are at least two versions of this Jess Franco film; a softcore version released under the title Shining Sex and a French version containing hardcore inserts.	French
Nazi Love Camp 27	1977	Some versions of this Italian film contain hardcore inserts.	Italian
Blue Rita (Le Cabaret des filles perverses)	1977	There are at least two versions of this Jess Franco film; the Director's Cut released theatrically in France in 1977; available also in German DVD) and a French version containing hardcore inserts.)	German
Caligula's Hot Nights (Le calde notti di Caligola)	1977	An erotic comedy shot in two versions; a softcore version and an international version containing one penetration insert and numerous fellatio inserts.	Italian
Sister of Ursula (La sorella di Ursula)	1978	The director Enzo Milioni confirmed the existence of both a softcore version and a hardcore version containing hardcore inserts added by the film's producers.	Italian
The Coming of Sin (La visita del vicio)	1978	This film was originally released in two versions; an international version (significantly shortened original Director's cut released in Holland and other European countries under the title Violation of the Bitch) and a hardcore version with inserts (released in Italian PAL VHS under the title Sodomia). The 2019 Arrow Films Blu-ray released Larraz's original, uncensored cut for the first time.	Spanish
Pleasure Shop on the Avenue (Il porno shop della settima strada)	1978	Originally shot as a softcore film. At the request of the producers, hardcore footage was added. The hardcore version of the film can be found on the Italian DVD by Cinesexy.	Italian
You're Driving Me Crazy	1978	There is a hardcore version of this film by David Grant, but it is not clear if any of the cast participated in the hardcore inserts.	English
Giallo a Venezia	1979	The Blu-ray version of this Italian giallo film released by Scorpion Releasing contains one hardcore insert.	Italian
Beast in Space (La bestia nello spazio)	1980	Severin Films released both a softcore version and a hardcore version made with separately shot hardcore sex scenes. It is uncertain which of the versions is original.	Italian
Blow Job (Soffio erotico)	1980	Director Alberto Cavallone stated that the film did not feature any sex scenes except for one scene of simulated oral sex. This claimed was refuted by other members of the film's production. A hardcore version of the film was shot with three uncredited performers who worked with Cavallon, including Pauline Teutscher, Guya Lauri Filzi, and Hassan Jabar. The film was distributed theatrically in Italy by Distribuzione Cinematografica in May 1980.	Italian, French
Libidomania 2 (Sesso perverso, mondo violento)	1980	A mondo film containing hardcore scenes. According to available sources, some of these "mondo sequences" are actually sections retrieved from other mondo films.	Italian
Sex and Black Magic (Orgasmo nero)	1980	This softcore film contains a single hardcore insert.	Italian
Porno Esotic Love (Sexy Erotic Love)	1980	To produce Porno Esotic Love, director Joe D'Amato juxtaposed sequences from Black Cobra Woman and Emanuelle in Bangkok with hardcore inserts added.	Italian
Emmanuelle in Soho	1981	A hardcore version British film contains with scenes performed by different actors, two female and one male.	English
Emmanuelle 4	1984	The Canadian VHS version of this film contains three hardcore inserts.	French
Lillian, the Perverted Virgin [Lilian (la virgen pervertida)]	1984	This Jess Franco film contains hardcore sex scenes which, according to available sources, were added later as an inserts to extend the already existing sex scenes as the film had been shot as a softcore "low-budget" drama. The film was theatrically released in Spain in 1984 and is available via Spanish kiosk DVD.	Spanish
Gutterballs	2008	This Canadian film exists in two versions; the Original Version with explicit shots of male and female genitalia, and so-called Pin-Etration Edition with short hardcore inserts, including a scene of vagina being penetrated by a rubber penis during the rape scene.	English
Antichrist	2009	This Lars von Trier film contains a scene of penetrative vaginal intercourse. Body doubles were used for the sex scene.	English
Clip	2012	Début film by Maja Miloš about hypersexualized teenagers. Contains two unsimulated fellatio scenes, "though Maja Milos points out that the young cast were not involved and body doubles were involved. In fact the end credits start with the statement, "Underaged persons weren't involved in scenes of explicit sex and nudity". Prosthetics and visual effects were also used for other scenes.	Serbian
Starlet	2012	This film contains a scene of penetration performed by a body double.	English
Nymphomaniac	2013	Lars von Trier used digital compositing to superimpose the genitals of pornographic film actors onto the bodies of the film's actors. Producer Louise Vesth explained during the Cannes Film Festival: "We shot the actors pretending to have sex and then had the body doubles, who really did have sex, and in post we will digital impose the two. So above the waist it will be the star and the (sic) below the waist it will be the doubles." The actresses playing the female lead at different ages, Charlotte Gainsbourg and Stacy Martin, further revealed that prosthetic vaginas were used during filming.	English
Stranger by the Lake	2013	Stranger by the Lake contains scenes of unsimulated sex performed by body doubles.	French

=== Performed by non-cast-members ===
Unsimulated sex performed exclusively by extras and/or adult performers and not involving the main actors.

Film Title	Release Year	Scenes(s) depicted	Language(s)
Emmanuelle	1974	Contains a scene in which a female dancer places a cigarette in her vagina and allows it to inhale and exhale the smoke.	French
Justine and Juliette (Justine och Juliette)	1975	Contains hardcore sex scenes performed by extras.	Swedish
Caligula	1978	The film's producer, Bob Guccione, added six minutes of several hardcore inserts performed by pornographic actors. The scenes shot by Tinto Brass are entirely softcore.	English
The Alcove	1985	Contains fingering in the form of in-film movie reels.	Italian
The Center of the World	2001	Contains a scene where a stripper, portrayed by pornographic actress Alisha Klass, inserts a lollipop into her vagina.	English
The Principles of Lust	2003	Contains an orgy scene performed by extras from a swingers' club.	English
Wetlands	2013	Contains a scene in which four men masturbate and ejaculate onto a spinach pizza. Pornographic actors were hired for the scene.	German
Mayhem	2017	A couple of office workers, who were a real life couple, engaged in real sex in the background.	English
Muscle	2019	Contains an orgy scene filmed at a swingers' club performed by the club's members.	English

=== Performed by cast members ===
Unsimulated sex performed by the main actors/actresses.

Film Title	Release Year	Scenes(s) depicted	Language(s)
Gift	1966	One of the first Danish films to include unsimulated sex scenes. The sex scenes were blocked by censors during showings in the United States.	Danish
They Call Us Misfits	1968	This Swedish documentary film, which was directed by Stefan Jarl and Jan Lindqvist, was released to cinemas in Sweden on 25 March 1968. The film is about two young "hippies" and musicians Kenta and Stoffe. This is the earliest "legal" film in Sweden to show a non-simulated sex scene.	Swedish
Blue Movie	1969	The first film depicting unsimulated sex to receive a wide theatrical distribution in the United States – a seminal film in the Golden Age of Porn (1969–1984) and, according to Warhol, a major influence in the making of Last Tango in Paris, an internationally controversial erotic drama film, starring Marlon Brando, and released a few years after Blue Movie was made.	English
Double Face	1969	There is a French hardcore version of this film entitled Chaleur et jouissance featuring actress Alice Arno.	Italian
Quiet Days in Clichy	1970	Contains numerous scenes of real sex.	Danish, English
Kama Sutra '71	1970	Contains hardcore sex scenes involving actress Ann Perry.	English
Cry Uncle!	1971	Contains unsimulated fellatio.	English
Luminous Procuress	1971	A homoerotic film containing scenes of hardcore heterosexual sex.	English
Pink Narcissus	1971	This experimental erotic art film features a scene of ejaculation	English
A Clock Work Blue	1972	This film is available in both softcore and a hardcore variations.	English
Pink Flamingos	1972	Banned in Australia in 1997. The Board unanimously noted a scene which included "close up real depictions of actual fellatio....which unambiguously contravene R classification guidelines.".	English
La verità secondo Satana (lit. The Truth According to Satan)	1972	This Italian film initially had limited distribution. To bypass censorship restrictions, Renato Polselli shot three different versions and added new footage to each print while deleting certain scenes. The "hardest" print features a female orgasm shot by filming the actress's face and pubic region.	Italian
Delirium (Delirio caldo)	1972	A German double DVD from 2014 entitled Das Grauen kommt nachts contains four different versions of this film, including both the original Italian version and the French hardcore version. The uncut version as the director intended it to be seen is also available in French DVD.	Italian
Christina, the Devil Nun (Cristiana monaca indemoniata)	1972	The uncut version of this film contains hardcore sex scenes.	Italian
I Jomfruens tegn (Danish Pastries)	1973	The first film in the Danish Zodiac series of mainstream comedies containing hardcore sex scenes.	Danish
Revelations of a Psychiatrist on the World of Sexual Perversion (Rivelazioni di uno psichiatra sul mondo perverso del sesso)	1973	This mondo film contains twenty minutes of hardcore sex in the orgy scene.	Italian
Fleshpot on 42nd Street	1973	This film exists in two versions; a hardcore version entitled Fleshpot on 42nd Street and a softcore version entitled The Girls of 42nd Street.	English
I Tyrens tegn (In the Sign of the Taurus)	1974	The second film in the Danish Zodiac series of mainstream comedies containing hardcore sex scenes.	Danish
Score	1974	This Radley Metzger film is based on an off-Broadway play that included Sylvester Stallone. The film contains a scene of real fellatio between Calvin Culver and Gerald Grant.	English
La Bonzesse	1974	This French film contains a scene of fellatio. The penetration scene may or may not be real.	French
Sweet Movie	1974	Contains unsimulated sex acts.	English, French, Polish, Spanish
Flossie	1974	This 1974 Swedish erotic film featuring actress Marie Forså, was shot in two versions; a softcore version and a hardcore version with inserts involving the actors from original production released in France in 1975. Bach Films DVD released both versions.	Swedish
Immoral Tales	1974	This film consists of four stories, titled La marée, Thérèse philosophe, Erszébet Báthory, and Lucrezia Borgia. In the third story, there is a close up scene of the insertion of a pearl into a vagina performed by an actress Marie Forså. The German Blu-ray edition of Immoral Tales contains a (pixelated) film clip from Borowczyk's A Private Collection that features unsimulated bestiality between a woman and a dog.	French, Italian, Hungarian
Lorna the Exorcist	1974	This Jess Franco film exists in a number of variations, including French versions of different lengths and an Italian version with hardcore footage shot by another director/producer, Robert de Nesle.	French
Voodoo Sexy (Il pavone nero)	1974	This film was released in both a softcore version on Italian VHS) and a hardcore version.	Italian
I Tvillingernes tegn (In the Sign of the Gemini)	1975	The third film in the Danish Zodiac series of mainstream comedies with hardcore sex scenes.	Danish
Der må være en sengekant (Come to My Bedside)	1975	The sixth film in the Danish Bedside series of erotic mainstream comedies - one of the two to feature hardcore sex scenes.	Danish
The Image	1975	This Radley Metzger film is based on the novel L'Image by Catherine Robbe-Grillet and features scenes of real S&M, fellatio and cunnilingus.	English, French
Number Two	1975	Numéro deux contains at least one unsimulated scene of fellatio.	French
But Who Raped Linda?	1975	There are two different versions of this Jess Franco film; a softcore version and a hardcore French version.	French
Female Vampire	1975	Jess Franco shot three different versions of the film originally entitled The Bare Breasted Countess; a straight vampire film called La comtesse noire, a horror-oriented erotic film entitled La Comtesse aux seins nus, and the hardcore version entitled Les avaleuses. The film premiered in France under the title La Comtesse noire in May 1975.	French
Les Chatouilleuses (Le sexy goditrici)	1975	In addition to the original French original released in 1975, there is also an Italian hardcore version released on VHS.	French
L'Éventreur de Notre-Dame (Exorcism)	1975	This film exists in several different variations, including a version entitled "Sexorcisme" with hardcore sex scenes.	French, Latin
The Bloodsucker Leads the Dance	1975	This film was released in France under the title L'Insatiable Samantha and contains hardcore scenes.	Italian
Lips of Blood	1975	Director Jean Rollin shot two versions of this film; the original softcore version released under the title Lèvres de Sang in 1975, and a hardcore version featuring a scene of fellatio under the title Suce-Moi Vampire in 1976.	French
Breaking Point	1975	The third film directed by Swedish director Bo Arne Vibenius. It contains numerous hardcore sex scenes.	English
Rolls-Royce Baby	1975	Contains fellatio scenes performed by actress Lina Romay.	German
Le Sexe qui parle	1975	This film by Claude Mulot was the first hardcore feature film produced and released in France to meet international success. The film was theatrically released in France in November 1975 (at the end of the period of Giscardian liberation, a month before introducing Classification X in France). The film is available in both hardcore version (Alpha France DVD) and softcore version (Bach Films DVD).	French
Thundercrack!	1975	This black comedy horror film contains hardcore sex scenes.	English
Butterflies	1975	This Swedish film is unique in that actress Marie Forså participates in unsimulated sex scenes in which penetration is briefly visible in an 111 minute version that was released by Retro Seduction Cinema (US) and Another World Entertainment (EU) as the director's cut. The producers filmed a series of closeup penetration shots for a 92 minute version called the "Grindhouse Cut" which does not involve the cast members.	English
Barbed Wire Dolls	1976	Contains a scene of digital penetration which had to be removed from the UK DVD version by Anchor Bay Entertainment in order to achieve an 18 classification.	French
Emanuelle in Bangkok	1976	The uncut Italian DVD version of this film contains scenes of vaginal penetration by ping pong balls.	Italian
Luxure (Lust)	1976	This Max Pécas film exists in both its original softcore version under the title of Luxure and a hardcore version entitled Sweet Taste of Honey.	French
Alice in Wonderland	1976	An erotic musical comedy in which Kristine DeBell performed in an unsimulated lesbian sex scene with Juliet Graham. It was produced as a softcore film, but later re-edited as a hardcore pornographic film, to include footage cut during the original production, including a sequence of DeBell performing oral sex on the film's producer, Bill Osco, which was edited into the film's Mad Hatter sequence.	English
Sømænd på sengekanten (Bedside Sailors)	1976	The and final film of the Danish Bedside series of erotic mainstream comedies - the second of the two to contain hardcore sex scenes, including clips from the short Color Climax #1283: Mail Order Sex (1973), watched on 8mm by the ship's crew.	Danish
I Løvens tegn (In the Sign of the Lion)	1976	The fourth film in the Danish Zodiac series of mainstream comedies, directed by Werner Hedman with hardcore sex scenes.	Danish
In the Realm of the Senses	1976	This Nagisa Oshima film features contains numerous hardcore sex scenes showing the genitals of actors.	Japanese
Through the Looking Glass	1976	Jonas Middleton shot three different versions of this film - two softcore, one hardcore.	English
A Real Young Girl	1976	Catherine Breillat's first feature film. It was shot in 1975, but banned for the next 25 years due to hardcore nature of its content, which includes full frontal nudity, bodily fluids, urination, and masturbation.	French
Die Marquise von Sade	1976	The Ascot Elite Entertainment Group Blu-ray release includes the hardcore director's cut and the softcore version of this Jess Franco film.	German
Girls in the Night Traffic	1976	The German Blu-ray Edition contains both the softcore and hardcore versions of this Jess Franco film.	German
The French Governess (Calde labbra)	1976	This film was released in two versions; a softcore version entitled Calde labbra/Excitation and a hardcore version entitled Burning Lips on VHS.	Italian
Inhibition	1976	NoShame Films released both an uncut hardcore version and a cut softcore version of this film by Paolo Poetti.	Italian
Sex Express	1976	The export version of thise Derek Ford film, Diversions, contains hardcore sex scenes performed by lead actress Heather Deeley.	English
Secrets of a Superstud	1976	A hardcore export version of this British film is entitled It's Getting Harder All the Time.	English
The Office Party	1976	A hardcore version of this David Grant film was released for foreign markets.	English
The Angel and the Woman	1977	Contains unsimulated sexual activity between its leads Carole Laure and Lewis Furey.	French
Agent 69 Jensen i Skorpionens tegn (Agent 69 in the Sign of Scorpio)	1977	The fifth film in the Danish Zodiac series of mainstream comedies with sex hardcore scenes.	Danish
Fate la nanna coscine di pollo	1977	Originally shot as a softcore film and [allegedly] released in 1977. A hardcore version under the title Gli amori morbosi di una contessina was released a few years later.	Italian
Emanuelle in America	1977	This film exists in both a softcore and a hardcore version.	Italian
Emanuelle Around the World	1977	The hardcore version of this film was prepared for the French market and contains penetration, oral sex, and bestiality scenes involving a snake and a dog.	Italian
Sister Emanuelle	1977	The Danish DVD version of this film contains hardcore sex scenes.	Italian
Under the Bed	1977	A hardcore export version of this British film by David Grant exists.	English
The Mark	1977	This Greek film exists in both a softcore version entitled The Mark and a hardcore version entitled Call Girl).	English
The Ceremony	1977	This film, also known as Erotiki Teleti exists in many variations, including hardcore.	Greek
Monsieur Sade	1977	This film opens with a "truly pornographic scene" - the rest of the sex is simulated.	French
Agent 69 Jensen i Skyttens tegn (Agent 69 Jensen in the Sign of Sagittarius)	1978	The and final film in the Danish Zodiac series of mainstream comedies with hardcore sex scenes.	Danish
Behind Convent Walls (Interno di un convento)	1978	The uncut version of this nunsploitation film contains a scene of female masturbation by a wooden dildo with the face of Christ painted on one end of it; "the most graphic sexual scene in the film and what makes the film infamous".	Italian
Blue Movie	1978	An 8mm version of this Alberto Cavallone contains hardcore sex scenes depicting fellatio and intercourses.	Italian
Immoral Women	1979	This French film consists of three stories titled Margherita, Marceline, and Marie. In the first story, Margherita, there is an unsimulated intercourse scene.	French, Italian
Images in a Convent	1979	Contains hardcore sex scenes.	Italian
Play Motel	1979	This giallo film contains hardcore sex scenes.	Italian
Malabimba - The Malicious Whore	1979	A nunsploitation film containing hardcore footage performed by actors from the main production. The film was distributed theatrically in Italy in September 1979.	Italian
Bare Behind Bars	1980	A women in prison film by Oswaldo de Oliveira containing hardcore sex scenes. The film was released theatrically in Brazil in 1980, and later in DVD by Blue Underground.	Portuguese
La gemella erotica	1980	Alberto Cavallone shot this film in both softcore and hardcore versions.	Italian
Erotic Nights of the Living Dead	1980	In his book assistant professor Danny Shipka of Louisiana State University gave Erotic Nights of the Living Dead negative review, criticizing the acting, gore, and sex scenes, and concluding that the merging of "hardcore sex and extreme violence is disturbing".	Italian
Sesso nero – Exotic Malice	1980	This Joe D'Amato film is considered by authors of the book Luce Rossa. La nascita e le prime fasi del cinema pornografico in Italia as the first Italian hardcore film to be shown in Italian theatres. It is explained on the site www.mondo-digital.com why this film, like most of D'Amato's films from the period, "can't be classified as a traditional porn film".	Italian
Flying Sex (Sesso profondo)	1980	An Italian film containing numerous hardcore sex scenes. The film was released in many European countries, including Italy and Sweden.	Italian
Quando l'amore è oscenità (lit. When love is obscenity)	1980	A film by Renato Polselli which, according to the source "his most notorious, most offensive, most challenging film". It was shot in 1973 but not released theatrically until 1979 and 1980 due to censorship. The uncut version of the film contains scenes of various types of sexual activities, some of which are hardcore.	Italian
Hard Sensation	1980	The uncut version of this film contains hardcore sex scenes.	Italian
Hotel Paradise (Orinoco: Prigioniere del sesso)	1980	Both the softcore and hardcore versions of this film can be found on the Danish DVD by Another World Entertainment.	Italian
The Porno Killers (Le porno killers)	1980	The uncut version of this film contains scenes of hardcore sex.	Italian
Spetters	1980	This Paul Verhoeven film contains numerous scenes of unsimulated sex.	Dutch
Taxi zum Klo	1980	Contains unsimulated gay sex scenes.	German, English, French
Cruising	1980	This thriller contains a brief shot of anal sex in its uncut version; 40 minutes of other unsimulated sex footage were shot but cut from all versions.	English
Fruits of Passion	1981	This French-Japanese co-production contains unsimulated fellatio. In his autobiography, Klaus Kinski stated that the sex scenes in which he participated in this film were unsimulated.	Cantonese, Japanese, English, French
Porno Holocaust	1981	Assistant professor Danny Shipka of Louisiana State University gave Porno Holocaust negative review, criticizing the acting, gore, and sex scenes, and concluding that the merging of "hardcore sex and extreme violence is disturbing".	Italian
Daydream	1981	Lead actress Kyōko Aizome engages in numerous unsimulated sex scenes in this Japanese pink film.	Japanese
Caligula... The Untold Story	1982	The uncut version of this film contains hardcore sex scenes of various sorts. Caligula... The Untold Story was released in Italy and in other European countries in both theaters and on home video in several different softcore and hardcore versions.	Italian
Scandale	1982	Contains both softcore and hardcore sex scenes.	French
Apocalipsis sexual (lit. Sexual apocalypse)	1982	A film by Carlos Aured and Sergio Bergonzelli (uncredited) which was released in both a softcore version on Spanish DVD and a hardcore version on Italian VHS.	Spanish
Aphrodite	1982	Contains a scene of the partial insertion of a big toe into a vagina. The film was released in French cinemas in July 1982.	French
Il nano erotico	1982	Two versions of this film exists; a softcore version entitled Essere tenuto – Being Captured, and a hardcore version entitled Baby Sitter [released in France as Petites fesses juvéniles (pour membres bienfaiteurs)]	Italian
My Nights with Messalina (Bacanales Romanas)	1982	This Spanish erotic peplum is one of the first films with hardcore sex scenes to be produced in Spain after the death of Francisco Franco in 1975, which led to the relaxing of censorship laws.	Spanish
Luz del Fuego	1982	This Brazilian film tells the liberal and romantic story of controversial Brazilian feminist Luz del Fuego. Film contains a scene in which the main actress rubs up against the penis.	Portuguese
Perdida em Sodoma	1982	This Brazilian film, usually translated as Lost Girl in Sodom, contains scenes of fellatio and penetration.	Portuguese
Killing of the Flesh (Delitto carnale)	1983	A hardcore and a softcore version of this giallo film was released.	Italian
Satan's Baby Doll	1983	A film by Mario Bianchi that was shot in two versions; an erotic horror softcore version that was released theatrically in Spain and Italy, and a hardcore version entitled Orgasmo di Satana in Italy. Although Bianchi and producer Gabriele Crisanti had denied it had ever existed, a hardcore version premiered on a German DVD in 2007.	Italian
Taking Tiger Mountain	1983	This film by Tom Huckabee and Kent Smith with Bill Paxton in the main role, contains several graphic scenes, including a brief shot of unsimulated fellatio.	English
James Joyce's Women	1985	This film is based on James Joyce's Ulysses and contains roughly twenty minutes of masturbation performed by Fionnula Flanagan, the main actress.	English
Devil in the Flesh	1986	Contains a brief scene of fellatio, during which the man tells the woman about Lenin's return to St. Petersburg in 1917.	Italian
Matador	1986	This erotic thriller film contains unsimulated sex in its opening scene with Assumpta Serna and Jesús Ruyman.	Spanish
Emmanuelle 5	1987	At least three versions of this film exists. The hardcore version was only released in France on VHS and contains intercourse, oral sex, masturbation and urination.	French, English
Emmanuelle 6	1988	The hardcore version of this film was released in France on VHS and is roughly 10 minutes longer than US DVD version.	French
Hotel St. Pauli	1988	Contains unsimulated oral sex.	Norwegian, Swedish
Kindergarten	1989	This Argentinian film by Jorge Polaco was banned for 20 years in Argentina due to nude content involving minors, as well as because of a brief hardcore scene featuring fellatio.	Spanish
Kinski Paganini	1989	Klaus Kinski's directorial debut. According to one reviewer: "[...] it is really extremely bizarre, in moments brutal and almost experimental film with plenty of softcore and hardcore scenes [...]"	Italian
Romper Stomper	1992	This Australian drama film contains vaginal penetration which can briefly be seen in the unrated version of the film and is confirmed by director Geoffry Wright in the director's commentary of the DVD.	English
The Soft Kill	1994	The DVD version of this film contains a brief shot of penetration.	English
Xue Lian (English title: Trilogy of Lust)	1995	A Hong Kong Category III film containing penetration and fellatio.	Cantonese
A Single Girl	1995	This French drama film contains a brief shot of penetration.	French
La Vie de Jésus (English title: The Life of Jesus)	1997	"In Life of Jesus, Dumont included close-ups of penetration to "emphasize the animal nature of the sex act."	French
Idioterne (English title: The Idiots)	1998	This Lars von Trier film contains brief shots of penetration and group sex.	Danish
L'Ennui	1998	Contains unsimulated sex scenes.	French
Fiona	1998	Contains a brief scene of fellatio.	English
Sodomites	1998	This short Gaspar Noé film is a hardcore safe-sex promo made for French television in 1998.	French
Jezus is een Palestijn (Jesus Is a Palestinian)	1999	A Dutch film containing a scene of penetration.	Dutch
Romance	1999	Contains male and female masturbation, fellatio, penetration, ejaculation, and sadomasochistic bondage.	French
The Man-Eater (La donna lupo)	1999	Contains a scene of unsimulated fellatio.	Italian
Guardami	1999	Contains unsimulated sex scenes, including fellatio by Elisabetta Cavallotti.	Italian
Vampire Strangler	1999	This William Hellfire film contains fellatio performed by then-girlfriend Misty Mundae as well as other hardcore sex scenes.	English
Lies (Gojitmal)	1999	Contains scenes of intercourse, fellatio, coprophilia and S&M.	Korean
Tokyo Elegy (Shabondama Elegy)	1999	Avant-garde film by Aryan Kaganof containing scenes of intercourse, fellatio, cunnilingus between by Dutch actor Thom Hoffman and Japanese adult actress Mai Hoshino.	Japanese, Dutch
Baise-moi	2000	Contains unsimulated sex scenes, including penetration and fellatio.	French
O Fantasma	2000	Contains a scene of homosexual fellatio.	Portuguese
Scrapbook	2000	Contains fellatio and golden showers.	English
Scarlet Diva	2000	Director, writer and actress Asia Argento confirmed that the sex acts depicted in the film were real.	English, Italian, French
Intimacy	2001	Contains a brief scene of fellatio.	English
Le Pornographe (The Pornographer)	2001	Contains hardcore sex scenes.	French
Lucía y el sexo (Sex and Lucia)	2001	Contains unsimulated sex scenes, including penetration and fellatio from the porn movie made by one of the film's characters as well as manual stimulation of an erect penis and cunnilingus.	Spanish, English
Hundstage (Dog Days)	2001	Contains a hardcore orgy scene.	German
Visitor Q	2001	This erotic black comedy-horror film contains unsimulated sex, though the genitalia is blurred.	Japanese
Lazaro's Girlfriend (La novia de Lázaro)	2002	Contains fellatio.	Spanish
Le loup de la côte Ouest (The Wolf of the West Coast)	2002	Contains unsimulated sex scenes.	French, English
Blissfully Yours (S̄ud s̄aǹeh̄ā)	2002	Contains a scene of manual stimulation of penis to erection.	Thai
Choses secrètes (Secret Things)	2002	A Jean-Claude Brisseau film about female sexuality that contains several unsimulated sex scenes, including public masturbation by a female character and an orgy scene.	French
Ken Park	2002	This Larry Clark film contains both simulated and unsimulated sex scenes.	English
Irréversible	2002	This controversial thriller film directed by Gaspar Noé features unsimulated sex, though the anal rape scene is simulated and features a penis rendered with Computer animation.	French
The Brown Bunny	2003	Contains a scene of fellatio performed by Vincent Gallo's former girlfriend Chloë Sevigny.	English
Fallo! (Private)	2003	This Tinto Brass film was released in two DVD versions; an Italian Director's Cut that contains unsimulated oral sex, and an alternate English-language Producers Cut which omits the unsimulated scene.	Italian, French, English, Spanish
Rossa Venezia	2003	Contains hardcore sex scenes, mostly lesbian.	German
Anatomie de l'enfer (Anatomy of Hell)	2004	This Catherine Breillat film contains "actual sex, high-level sex scenes and high-level themes" according to the Australian Classification Review Board.	French
9 Songs	2004	Contains numerous unsimulated sex scenes performed by Kieran O'Brien and Margo Stilley.	English
Story of the Eye	2004	Based on the novel Story of the Eye by Georges Bataille, this film features numerous hardcore sex scenes.	English
Kärlekens språk 2000	2004	A Swedish (fictional) sex education film containing real sex scenes.	Swedish
Stupid Boy (Garçon stupide)	2004	Contains "strong real sex". It was theatrically released in at least three countries, including France, Germany and Spain.	French
8mm 2	2005	Contains various unsimulated sex scenes - group sex, female masturbation, oral stimulation, authentic pornography frames, and lesbian cunnilingus.	English
Kissing on the Mouth	2005	Contains masturbation and ejaculation.	English
The Wayward Cloud	2005	Contains fellatio and penetration.	Mandarin
Princesas	2005	Contains a scene of unsimulated fellatio.	Spanish
Lie with Me	2005	This Canadian film contains "medium-to-hardcore sex".	English, Spanish
Destricted	2006	A compilation of seven short films made by artists and independent film-makers who were commissioned to "explore the fine line where art and pornography intersect", which "contains strong, real sex".	English
Shortbus	2006	Several actors perform real sexual acts - masturbation, autofellatio, coitus, and fellatio.	English
Taxidermia	2006	Contains two sequences of brief real sexual activity - male masturbation and vaginal penetration.	Hungarian, English, Russian
Les Anges Exterminateurs	2006	The second Jean-Claude Brisseau film that explores female sexuality. It contains unsimulated female masturbation.	French
Auftauchen (also known as Amour fou)	2006	Felicitas Korn's feature film debut contains numerous unsimulated sex scenes.	German
Ex Drummer	2007	This Flemish film contains "strong real sex". It was theatrically released in Belgium and Netherlands.	Dutch
It Is Fine! Everything Is Fine.	2007	This film directed by David Brothers and Crispin Glover contains penetration.	English
The Story of Richard O. (L'histoire de Richard O.)	2007	Contains nunerous unsimulated sex scenes.	French, Finnish
Import/Export	2007	The second feature film by Ulrich Seidl contains images of real sex including fingering, penetration, and oral sex.	German, Slovak, Russian, English
Serbis (English title: Service)	2008	Contains explicit fellatio.	Filipino, Tagalog
Tropical Manila	2008	Contains several real sex acts, including fellatio.	Filipino, Korean
Otto; or Up with Dead People	2008	Contains "strong real sex".	English, German
À l'aventure	2008	The third film by Jean-Claude Brisseau about female sexuality, containing unsimulated female masturbation and orgasm.	French
Amateur Porn Star Killer 2	2008	Contains scenes of penetration and oral sex.	English
Aka Ana	2008	This film by Antoine d'Agata contains scenes of d’Agata himself engaging in penetrative sex with numerous women.	Japanese
Little Ashes	2008	Robert Pattinson masturbated on set to act out an orgasm.	English
House of Flesh Mannequins	2009	This Domiziano Cristopharo film contains both real sex scenes and (at least some) real torture scenes performed by international porn stars and extreme body art performers, respectively. The US DVD release is Director's Cut (with warning).	English
Enter the Void	2009	This Gaspar Noé film contains a long sequence of hardcore sex.	English, Japanese
The Band	2009	Contains numerous sequences of unsimulated sex.	English
Dogtooth	2009	A film by Yorgos Lanthimos. "The brief real sex is used to establish the unusual and dysfunctional lifestyle that results from the isolation orchestrated by the dictatorial father, including incest."	Greek
Engel mit schmutzigen Flügeln (Angels with Dirty Wings)	2009	In this film by Roland Reber, the actress Antje Mönning has unsimulated sex in front of the camera.	German
Now & Later	2009	This American independent film by French director Philippe Diaz contains multiple simulated sex scenes and one unsimulated oral sex scene performed by Shari Solanis on James Wortham.	English
Human Zoo	2009	Contains a scene of unsimulated cunnilingus.	English, Serbian, Aerbian, French
Mundane History	2009	Contains a scene of explicit male masturbation.	Thai
Melancholie der Engel	2009	This highly controversial and criticised German independent horror film contains unsimulated sexual content. The cast members were reported to be under the influence of drugs during production.	German
Greek Pete	2009	Contains unsimulated gay sex acts and male masturbation.	English
Bedways	2010	Contains real sex scenes, including two scenes of masturbation.	German
Rio Sex Comedy	2010	Contains one unsimulated sex scene involving actress Irène Jacob.	English, French
The Bunny Game	2010	Contains a long scene of unsimulated fellatio.	English
Año bisiesto (Leap Year)	2010	This film by Michael Rowe contains unsimulated sex scenes.	Spanish
Gandu	2010	Contains numerous actual sex scenes.	Bengali
LelleBelle	2010	This film by Mischa Kamp contains images of unsimulated penetration.	Dutch
Q (Desire)	2011	Contains scenes of unsimulated sex.	French
愛很爛 (Love Actually... Sucks!)	2011	This Hong Kong film by Scud contains fellatio performed by Linda So on Haze Leung.	Mandarin, Cantonese, English
Chatrak (Mushrooms)	2011	This Indian Bengali film contains a scene of unsimulated cunnilingus involving actors Paoli Dam and Anubrata Basu.	Bengali
Caged	2011	This 2011 Dutch film contains several unsimulated sex scenes.	Dutch
Léa	2011	Contains a scene of unsimulated cunnilingus.	French
The Wrong Ferarri	2011	An experimental film written, directed by, and starring, musician Adam Green, which contains a scene of Green being anally penetrated by a dildo.	English
The Slut	2011	This film, directed by and starring Hagar Ben Ashar, contains unsimulated intercourse.	Hebrew
Whores' Glory	2011	This documentary about prostitutes from Thailand, Bangladesh and Mexico by Austrian director Michael Glawogger contains fellatio.	Thai, Bengali, Spanish
Paradise: Faith	2012	Paradise: Faith is a 2012 Austrian film directed by Ulrich Seidl, the second in his Paradise trilogy. It contains "strong real sex," including brief scenes of masturbation and fellatio.	German
They Call It Summer (E la chiamano estate)	2012	A film by Paolo Franchi that contains unsimulated sex involving Isabella Ferrari.	Italian
I Want Your Love	2012	A feature-length film containing "strong real sex" between men.	English
Sexual Chronicles of a French Family (Chroniques sexuelles d'une famille d'aujourd'hui)	2012	This film by Pascal Arnold and Jean-Marc Barr exists in two versions: a softcore version entitled Sensual version and a hardcore version entitled Sexual version..	French
Pornopung	2013	A 2013 Norwegian film containing a scene of unsimulated fellatio.	Norwegian
The To-Do List	2013	Actress Aubrey Plaza was instructed by director Maggie Carey to genuinely masturbate for a scene in which Plaza's character explores her sexuality.	English
Pasolini	2014	A film about the final day in the life of Pier Paolo Pasolini. Contains an unsimulated fellatio sequence.	English, Italian, French
Diet of Sex	2014	Contains numerous unsimulated sex scenes.	Spanish
River of Fundament	2014	This film by Matthew Barney contains an unsimulated rimjob, golden showers, and the insertion of a glass eye into the anus, as well as numerous other sex scenes.	English
Angry Painter (Sungnan Hwaga)	2015	Contains "x-rated" sexual content, including unsimulated intercourse scenes between Moon Jong-won and Russian actress Natallia Bulynia in which the genitals are optically blurred.	Korean
Love	2015	This Gaspar Noé film contains scenes of unsimulated sexual activity and is notable for being a 3-D film.	English
Melon Rainbow	2015	A short film about a young woman who works in a home for blind people. Contains unsimulated fellatio.	Danish
Paris 05:59: Théo & Hugo	2016	This film opens with an 18-minute unsimulated gay orgy scene at a Paris sex club.	French
We Are the Flesh (Tenemos la carne)	2016	This Mexican film contains unsimulated sex scenes, including a scene of masturbation to climax.	Spanish
Needle Boy	2016	A Danish film by Alexander Bak Sagmo containing unsimulated sex scenes.	Danish
Love Machine (Mashina Lyubvi)	2016	A somewhat controversial (regarding its intention), sexually explicit film by Pavel Ruminov that contains a few hardcore scenes, including oral sex.	Russian
Jesús	2016	Contains unsimulated fellatio, mutual masturbation, and anal intercourse.	Spanish
The Night (La noche)	2016	Contains lengthy sequences of unsimulated sexual acts.	Spanish
A Thought of Ecstasy	2017	Contains images of full-frontal nudity, erect penises, exposed vaginas, as well as unsimulated sex scenes.	German
Picture of Beauty	2017	A film by Maxim Ford containing unsimulated sex scenes.	English
Portraits of Andrea Palmer	2017	A horror film containing scenes of masturbation, fellatio, and intercourse.	English
Berlin Drifters	2017	This German film contains various unsimulated gay sex scenes.	Japanese, German, English
Marfa Girl 2	2018	A sequel to Larry Clark's Marfa Girl (2012), this film contains unsimulated sex scenes.	English
Wij	2018	This Dutch film contains unsimulated sex scenes.	Dutch
Mektoub, My Love: Intermezzo	2019	A film by Abdellatif Kechiche containing a 13-minute scene of unsnmulated cunnilingus.	French
Bullets of Justice	2019	This Bulgarian film by Valeri Milev and Timur Turisbekov contains unsimulated sex.	English
One Last Time	2020	A film by Olympe de G. containing scenes of unsimulated penetration, masturbation and cunnilingus.	French
Dry Wind	2020	This Brazilian drama contains unsimulated gay sex scenes, including fellatio.	Brazilian
PVT Chat	2020	A film by Ben Hozie containing unsimulated masturbation	English
Public Eye	2021	A film written and directed by Davo Hardy, as well as starring him, contains explicit masturbation scenes from both genders, as well as brief allusions to other sexual acts performed by members of the ensemble cast.	English
Bad Luck Banging or Loony Porn	2021	A film by Radu Jude containing unsimulated oral sex and vaginal intercourse.	Romanian
Blue Heart	2021	Contains a single sex scene in which an unsimulated handjob, penetration, and cunnilingus are performed.	Spanish
Blank Narcissus (Passion of the Swamp)	2022	A short film spinoff of Pink Narcissus (1971), directed by British director Peter Strickland. Contains unsimulated masturbation.	English
Grand Jeté	2022	This German drama by Isabelle Stever contains unsimulated manual stimulation of a penis.	German
Rotting in the Sun	2023	A film by Sebastián Silva containing scenes of unsimulated oral and anal sex.	English, Spanish
The Visitor	2024	This film by Bruce LaBruce, inspired by Pier Paolo Pasolini's Teorema, contains scenes of unsimulated heterosexual and homosexual sex, including oral, vaginal, and anal intercourse.	English
Castration Movie Anthology I. Traps	2024	This anthology drama film written, directed by and starring Louise Weard contains unsimulated sex scenes.	English
Mothers, Lovers and Others	2025	This film, written, directed and starring by Davo Hardy opens at a bisexual orgy with numerous depictions of unsimulated sex, including mutual masturbation, fellatio and cunnilingus.	English
Castration Movie Anthology II. The Best of Both Worlds	2025	The sequel to Castration Movie Anthology II, written, directed by and starring Louise Weard, features unsimulated sex.	English

== In television ==
Title	Series Duration	Description	Language
X Femmes	2008–2009	A French erotic series depicting erotica from a female point of view.	French

== In music videos ==
Music videos containing unsimulated sexual activity.

Title	Year	Notes	Language
Björk - "Pagan Poetry"	2001	Directed by Nick Knight, this music video for the song from the acclaimed album Vespertine features private sex footage shot by the singer Björk that was digitally altered.	English
Placebo - "Protège-moi"	2003	Directed by Gaspar Noé, was not officially released at the time and was replaced with footage of the song being performed live.	French, English
Rammstein - "Pussy"	2009	The music video included unsimulated sex scenes of body doubles of German band Rammstein.	German, English
Mei Ming - "Take me as I am"	2013	This music video by the Spanish band Mei Mein features unsimulated sex between the band's members.	Spanish
Xiu Xiu - "Black Dick"	2014	This music video by the experimental rock band features unsimulated sex and was released via Pornhub, but is now currently unavailable.	English
Peaches - "Rub"	2015	The music video directed by Peaches herself, A.L. Steiner & Lex Vaughn includes unsimulated lesbian cunnilingus, and brief vaginal penetration with sex toys.	English
Novedades Carminha - "Ritmo en la sangre"	2016	The music video included unsimulated sex scenes of Spanish rock band Novedades Carminha with Amarna Miller on the band's website which requires a password to watch the video.	Spanish
Nikoline - "Gourmet"	2020	The music video included unsimulated sex scenes between Nikoline and Sara Hjort Ditlevsen as well as including heterosexual sex.	Danish
Lindemann - "Platz Eins"	2020	The music video included unsimulated sex scenes between Till Lindemann, his body double and various women.	German

== See also ==
- Exploitation film
- Art house film
- Film censorship in the United States
