= List of Danish films of the 1970s =

List of Danish films

The following table is a list of films produced in Denmark or in the Danish language during the 1970s. For an alphabetical list of all Danish films currently on Wikipedia see Category:Danish films. For Danish films from other decades see the Cinema of Denmark box above.

Danish Title	English Title	Director(s)	Cast	Genre	Notes
1970
Ang.: Lone	Ang.: Lone	Franz Ernst			Entered into the 21st Berlin International Film Festival
Rend mig i revolutionen	Revolution My A..	Erik Balling	Ove Sprogøe, Poul Bundgaard, Helle Virkner	Comedy	
Hurra for de blå husarer	Hooray for the Blue Hussars	Annelise Reenberg	Emil Hass Christensen, Lone Hertz, Ghita Norby, Dirch Passer	Romantic comedy	
1971
Guld til præriens skrappe drenge	Gold for the Tough Guys of the Prairie	Finn Karlsson	Dirch Passer	Western Comedy	
Bennys badekar	Benny's Bathtub	Jannik Hastrup, Flemming Quist Møller	Bo Jakobsen	Animation	Bodil Award; Listed in Denmark's cultural canon
Tandlæge på Sengekanten	Bedside Dentist	John Hilbard	Ole Søltoft, Birte Tove	Comedy	
Revolutionen i Vandkanten	Sunny Beach Revolution	Thomas Winding	Olaf Nielsen, Flemming Quist Møller	Comedy	
Med Kærlig Hilsen	Love Me Darling	Gabriel Axel	Buster Larsen, Birte Tove	Comedy	
Frigjorte Christa	Swedish Fly Girls	Jack O'Connell	Birte Tove, Inger Stender	Erotica	
Den forsvundne fuldmægtig	The Missing Clerk	Gert Fredholm			Entered into the 22nd Berlin International Film Festival
1972
Dukkens Død		Erik Rasmussen	Anja Miehe-Renard, Jørgen Kiil, Søren Elung Jensen	Horror	
Mor, Jeg Har Patienter		Thomas Winding	Olaf Nielsen, Otto Brandenburg, Jytte Abildstrøm	Comedy	
Man Sku' Være Noget ved Musikken	Oh, to Be on the Bandwagon!	Henning Carlsen	Karl Stegger, Birgitte Bruun	Drama	Entered into the 22nd Berlin International Film Festival
Lenin, Din Gavtyv	Lenin, You Rascal, You	Kirsten Stenbæk	Peter Steen, Dirch Passer	Comedy	
Olsen-bandens Store Kup	The Olsen Gang's Big Score	Erik Balling	Ove Sprogøe, Morten Grunwald, Poul Bundgaard, Kirsten Walther	Comedy	
Farlige Kys	Dangerous Kisses	Henrik Stangerup	Lotte Tarp, Erik Wedersøe	Romance Drama	
1973
Olsen-banden går amok					
Mig og Mafiaen					
I din fars lomme		Inger Stender			
1974
I tyrens tegn					
Prins Piwi					
1975
En lykkelig skilsmisse	A Happy Divorce	Henning Carlsen			Entered into the 1975 Cannes Film Festival
Bejleren - en jysk røverhistorie					
Familien Gyldenkål					
La' os være	Leave Us Alone	Ernst Johansen, Lasse Nielsen			Entered into the 25th Berlin International Film Festival
Piger i trøjen					
Bejleren - en jysk røverhistorie					
Per		Hans Kristensen			
Olsen-banden på sporet	The Olsen Gang on the Track				
1976
Blind makker					
Spøgelsestoget	Ghost Train International	Bent Christensen	Dirch Passer	Family, Horror	
Sømænd på sengekanten					
Hopla på sengekanten					
Strømer	Cop	Anders Refn	Jens Okking, Lotte Hermann, Bodil Kjer, Birgit Sadolin	Crime	
Julefrokosten					
1977
Aftenlandet	Evening Land	Peter Watkins			Entered into the 10th Moscow International Film Festival
Hærværk					
Familien Gyldenkål vinder valget					
Pas på ryggen, professor					
Terror					
En Forårsdag i Helvede	A Sunday in Hell	Jørgen Leth		Documentary	road cycling
Drenge	Boys	Nils Malmros			
1978
Hør, var der ikke en som lo?					
Mig og Charly					
Trællene					
I skyttens tegn					
Slægten					
Vinterbørn	Winterborn	Astrid Henning-Jensen			Won the Silver Bear for Best Director at Berlin
Du er ikke alene	You Are Not Alone	Ernst Johansen, Lasse Nielsen	Anders Agensø, Peter Bjerg	Romance Drama	Coming of age, Coming out, Homosexuality
Honning Måne	In My Life	Bille August			Entered into the 11th Moscow International Film Festival
1979
Trællenes oprør					
Krigernes børn					
Johnny Larsen		Morten Arnfred			
