= Sytten =

1956 film by Annelise Meineche

- Cover of the Danish DVD
- Directed by: Annelise Meineche
- Written by: Bob Ramsing; Carl Erik Soya (novel)
- Starring: Ole Søltoft; Ghita Nørby
- Cinematography: Ole Lytken
- Edited by: Edith Schlüssel
- Music by: Ole Høyer
- Production company: Palladium Film
- Release date: 6 September 1965
- Running time: 87 minutes
- Country: Denmark
- Language: Danish

Sytten (English title: Eric Soya's "17") is a 1965 Danish coming-of-age sex comedy directed by Annelise Meineche and starring Ole Søltoft and Ghita Nørby. Søltoft plays a 17-year-old high school student who discovers the youthful excesses of sexual desire during his summer vacation in 1913. Based upon the semi-autobiographical 1953 novel by Carl Erik Soya, Sytten was a financial success for the Palladium Film company and ushered in a wave of erotic films such as the Bedside-films and Zodiac-films, most of which starred Søltoft.

== Plot ==
In the summer of 1913, 17-year-old Jacob (Ole Soltoft), a Danish high school student, lives in the frustrating limbo between boyhood and manhood. He worries about his excessive focus on masturbation and, although he is aware of the sexual overtures by the housemaid Sophie (Lise Rosendahl), Jacob doesn't know how to respond to her. Jacob is invited to spend his vacation at the summer house of his wealthy uncle (Ole Monty). At the summer house in an idyllic coastal town, Jacob meets his uncle, aunt (Bodil Steen), free-spirited housemaid Hansigne (Susanne Heinrich), virginal housekeeper Rosegod (Lily Broberg), and his dream-girl cousin Vibeke (Ghita Nørby). He is also pursued by his Uncle's employee (Ingolf David), who tries to seduce Jacob. While the Uncle is off on a fishing trip and the Aunt spends the night in town with her lover, Jacob has his first sexual experience with Vibeke—an awkward encounter. Afterwards, when Vibeke leaves for school, Jacob spends his nights with Hansigne—a joyful, uncomplicated and liberated woman. She guides him through his awkwardness and teaches him erotic techniques. One night, Hansigne's boyfriend Knud (Hugo Herrestrup) catches them together and attacks and threatens Jacob. Jacob discovers he finally feels like a man. In great spirits, he returns home after vacation and prepares to accept the advances of Sophie.

== Cast ==
- Ole Søltoft as Jacob Petersen, a 17-year-old searching for sexual experience. The role was a break-out performance for the 23-year-old Søltoft. Although he tried a few serious roles, he was quickly typecast in comedic sex romps. Through the late-60s and 70s, he went on to star in a successful series of Danish sex comedies before retiring from film in 1978.
- Ghita Nørby as Vibeke
- Emil Hass Christensen as Professor Petersen
- Ole Monty as Jacob's Uncle
- Bodil Steen as Jacob's Aunt
- Lily Broberg as Mrs. Rosegod
- Arthur Jensen as Konduktøren
- Henry Nielsen as Stationsforstanderen
- Annie Birgit Garde as Girl on Train
- Susanne Heinrich as Hansigne
- Ingolf David as Pharmacist
- Jørgen Kiil as Dr. Irving Mogensen
- Hugo Herrestrup as Knud
- Lise Rosendahl as Sophie
- Jytte Abildstrøm as Mrs. Steinkop

== Reaction ==
Although Sytten was one of the first mainstream films in Denmark dealing with explicit nudity and sex (along with Halløj i himmelsengen and I, a Woman), the film provoked little controversy within the country. It had been more than ten years since the Danish public was indignant over the publication of Soya's novel as well as other controversial novels by Henry Miller and Agnar Mykle. By 1965, Danish attitudes had changed. In 1964, the state prosecutor had brought a pro forma obscenity case against the publishers of a new translation of Fanny Hill which ended in acquittal. Two years later, Denmark's laws against pornographic literature were repealed, and, in 1969, pictorial pornography was also decriminalized.

Reaction outside of Denmark was different and viewings were limited. In the United Kingdom, the British Board of Film Censors (BBFC) refused to certify Sytten for viewing in standard cinemas. However, the final decision is always left to individual local authorities (which normally follow the BBFC's decisions). Only in London, the Greater London Council permitted showings under an X-rating (for individuals aged 16 or over, at that time).

The film became an enormous box office success in Denmark, achieving a record profit of 3 million Danish kroner for the Palladium film studio. Palladium followed it the next year with a more serious work, Soya's Tagsten, also based upon a novel by Soya, however this film was a financial failure. After a few more attempts at more serious erotic films, Palladium finally discovered the correct formula was sex comedies with Ole Søltoft in the lead, such as Mazurka på sengekanten,. The film was the final production by Palladium, but it was another box-office hit, had many sequels and continued the wave of erotic comedies.

== See also ==
- Bedside-films
- Zodiac-films
