= Céline (1992 film) =

1992 French magical realism drama film by Jean-Claude Brisseau

- Theatrical release poster
- Directed by: Jean-Claude Brisseau
- Written by: Jean-Claude Brisseau
- Produced by: Jean-Claude Brisseau
- Starring: Isabelle Pasco; Lisa Hérédia; Danièle Lebrun; Daniel Tarrare
- Cinematography: Romain Winding
- Edited by: María Luisa García
- Music by: Georges Delerue
- Production companies: Gaumont; La Sorcière Rouge
- Distributed by: Gaumont Distribution
- Release date: 1 April 1992 (France)
- Running time: 88 minutes
- Country: France
- Language: French
- Box office: $900,000

Céline is a 1992 French magical realism drama film written and directed by Jean-Claude Brisseau. It was entered into the 42nd Berlin International Film Festival.

== Synopsis ==
Céline, a young woman ready to commit suicide, is taken in by Geneviève, a nurse who soothes and cares for her by teaching her relaxation techniques. Céline quickly takes a liking to these exercises and loses herself in meditation. But soon, she realizes that a strange phenomena are happening inside and around her.

== Plot ==
At 22, Céline lost everything in just a few days: her father (a billionaire who died in her arms), her family (she learned that she was the adopted child of an employee of her "father", who died by giving birth to her), her fortune (disappointed, she voluntarily renounces her share of the inheritance), and her fiancé Olivier (who leaves her at that moment).

She is nothing anymore.

Geneviève, a home nurse, discovers her, prostrate and crying in the street, in the rain. Céline is brought back to her home in the “Vieux Moulin” by the latter, and almost immediately attempts suicide by swallowing sleeping pills and throwing herself into the property's pond.

Geneviève saves her from her drowning attempt, and is then offered by Céline's "mother", Madame Giraud, to be hired to live at the "Vieux Moulin" and take care of Céline while she recovers. .

Geneviève, having herself experienced a similar crisis following her divorce a few years earlier, and living under the threat of heart disease, accepts this proposal.

First, she offers Céline classic medical treatment, based on tranquilizers. Then she soon stops giving her tablets, telling her that if she sincerely wants to get better, she can come to her and ask for help.

What Céline finally does: “Help me!”, she says to Geneviève. To Céline's astonishment, Geneviève begins by giving her a life discipline, simple but strict, to which she ends up, willingly or unwillingly, by complying. Then Geneviève leads her towards relaxation, meditation and teaches her yoga.

With Gérard, her doctor friend and occasional companion, Geneviève notices that the young girl is regaining a taste for life and is starting to work again. The friendly ties between Geneviève and Céline strengthen over time. The two women lead a peaceful life, in harmony with nature.

However, Céline becomes more and more absorbed in meditation exercises, and begins to develop paranormal powers: she proves capable of mentally projecting herself elsewhere, has premonitions (she thus avoids a fatal car accident which takes the life of a friend of the two girls), and finds herself in two places at once by bilocation.

This spiritual ascension of Céline continues to crescendo, to the point that beneficial phenomena, which resemble miracles, occur around her, in particular spontaneous healings (first that, benign, of a few small child scratches, until to that, major, of a paralytic who regains the use of his legs in his proximity).

All to the great dismay of Geneviève, who can only observe the situation, and to whom one day appears a large and threatening black silhouette. The paranormal phenomena further amplify around Céline, to the point of levitating in front of Geneviève. Even more, Céline feels irresistibly attracted towards what she calls (for lack of a better term) "God", to the point of managing to merge with the divine during her meditation sessions.

Her reputation as a miracle worker soon spreads throughout the neighborhood: people come to see her as a holy healer. One of her visitors even claims to have seen Christ at her side. When the manifestations of gullibility reach such a point that people are lining up in front of her house to meet her, Céline can no longer stand it and decides to leave.

Leaving Geneviève alone and distraught, Céline explains to her in a letter that she has entered the orders, that the paranormal phenomena have ceased around her, and that she is sent, perhaps for life, on a mission to the Chinese border (and incidentally that she donated the property to her).

Geneviève becomes depressed, collapses, and ends up suffering a serious heart attack one evening. The large black silhouette, which is none other than the Shadow of Death, comes to get her, and she is about to die when Céline appears to her. Luminous and pure, Céline chases away the apparition, and slips a ring on Geneviève's finger consecrating their eternal friendship (and proof of the objective reality of events) before disappearing.

In the early morning, Geneviève, very much alive, then makes the decision to get into a serious relationship with her friend Gérard, and to open a shared office with him in the house, while outside, the sun shines and nature pulsates.

And Life goes on.

== Cast ==
- Isabelle Pasco as Céline
- Lisa Hérédia as Geneviève
- Danièle Lebrun as Madame Giraud
- Daniel Tarrare as Gérard
- Damien Dutrait as Roland
- Lucien Plazanet as Lucien
- Sébastien Lenfant as Sébastien
- François Eychart as Sébastien's father
- Marie-Thérèse Eychard as Sébastien's mother
- Pascale Simeon as nurse
- Pascal Eychart as child with injured arm
- Jacques Gelat as friend from accident
- Elodie Plaquet as little girl with cat
- François Rauscher as Olivier
- Yves Jeannin as Monsieur Giraud
