= Sesso nero =

- Film poster (Italian theatrical release)
- Directed by: Joe D'Amato
- Screenplay by: George Eastman
- Story by: George Eastman
- Produced by: Joe D'Amato
- Starring: Mark Shannon; Annj Goren; George Eastman; Lucia Ramirez
- Cinematography: Joe D'Amato
- Edited by: Ornella Micheli
- Music by: Nico Fidenco
- Production company: P.C.M. International
- Release date: July 1, 1980 (Italy)
- Country: Italy
- Language: Italian
- Budget: 20.000.000 lire (according to George Eastman)
- Box office: 54.122.000 lire (1980-81)

Sesso nero (literally: "Black sex"; internationally: Sexy Erotic Love; United States DVD release: Exotic Malice) is a 1980 Italian adult drama film starring Mark Shannon, Annj Goren, Lucia Ramirez, and George Eastman, who also wrote the screenplay. It was produced, directed and photographed by Joe D'Amato.

The film is most notable for being the first Italian hardcore pornographic film to be shown in Italian theatres, and one in a series of four hardcore pornographic films D'Amato shot back-to-back in the second half of 1979 in the Dominican Republic, the others being the porn/horror crossover films Erotic Nights of the Living Dead and Porno Holocaust, and the pornographic thriller Hard Sensation. Although Sesso Nero was the last one of these films to be shot, it was the first to be distributed and shown in Italian theatres.

The film is also notable for its thematic richness unusual for the genre, including the theme of illness, voodoo haunting, and the final gory scene of self-castration. It has been called the best film of early Italian hardcore film production by experts on the subject and has become a cult film.

== Plot ==
New York businessman Mark Lester is diagnosed with a hypertrophy of the prostate requiring surgery in two weeks according to his doctor, who hands him a syringe and medication against the pain. Mark does not to tell his wife, deciding to use the time to return to Santo Domingo, where 12 years ago he met Maira, the woman of his life.

At the island airport, Mark meets his old friend Jacques who has reserved a room for him at the Sheraton. Jacques tells Mark that Maira really loved him and would have followed him but was too poor to do so. When Maira disappeared, her father, an old voodoo magician, left his house to stay at Boca de Yuma, a wild place at the other side of the island, together with his little daughter.

While Mark is dreaming of his upcoming surgery in his room, a hotel maid masturbates, looking at his exposed penis. When he wakes up, he has sex with her. In a call home, he learns his wife is drunk. Later, walking the streets, he sees Maira's reflection in a shopping window, looking at him. She appears unchanged by time.

At Jacques', Mark meets Lucia, whom Jacques rescued from prostitution when she was 15. Lucia had the idea of founding a school, but they need funding. In Jacques' absence, Mark says he is nauseated by their kindness, talks about perhaps providing the funding himself, and asks Lucia to do as she did with 15. Disgusted, she performs oral sex on him "for Jacques". Later, Mark is in genital pain, and Jacques accompanies him to the hotel, where Mark injects himself with the painkiller. Jacques tells him to stay away from himself and Lucia.

In the streets, Mark spots Maira again. She addresses him, saying it was his return that makes her appearance possible. When Mark is forced to grope his groin in pain, she vanishes. At night, Mark meets his friend Voyakis, now owner of a successful nightclub. Mark tells him about once seeing a voodoo magician performing a strange rite after a car accident: He collected the soul in a bottle, and people said that if he opened it again, the soul would return again. Watching the gay dancer and his female partner dance to the music of "Sexy Night", Mark hallucinates her being Maira and experiences another fit of genital pain.

The next day, he goes to Boca di Yuma and meets Maira's father at the beach. He tells him that he collected her last breath in the bottle. She carried his name on her lips, cursing him. He also tells him he will never leave and that his illness will become stronger until he dies. She will not let him leave, and he will stay forever. When Mark asks him whether she is alive, he tells him she died long ago, but that for him she is alive until he too will live. In his glass bottle, he keeps her soul so that no evil spirit can disturb her eternal sleep.

When Mark's wife Liza arrives, he is asleep. She undresses, and wakes him up. She wants him to return with her for surgery. They talk about her sterility and his impending castration. When she mentions that she bought him with her money, Mark slaps her so she is flung onto the bed, which causes his erection and he penetrates her from behind.

Later, Mark receives a message from Maira and goes off to meet her on the beach where he remembers having sex with her back then. He meets her there and can feel the warmth of her skin, proving to himself it is not just a mad dream. He still desires her more than anything. She, however, is reproachful of his arrogant and destructive possessiveness and accuses him of having broken his promises and leaving her. She drugs him with a rare herb called "Mexican mushroom", then performs oral sex on an approaching black local while he is watching, immobilized by the drug.

Liza, realising Mark has left her without even a message, books a flight back for the next day. At the airport, a man tells her that her husband will die if she leaves. In the meantime, Mark hides in a dark hotel room getting drunk and sees Maira and the overweight hotel owner having sex with two black men. Liza, after having looked for Mark in vain, visits Jacques, who locates him for her with a brief phone call. In return, he wants to get back what was taken from him, having sex with Liza while Lucia is watching, pleasuring herself. Mark, after injecting a high dose of painkiller, hallucinates about his surgery and about having sex with Lucia on the beach. He runs a temperature, and Maira comes to visit him in his room, wanting to take care of him, but leaving him again. In a fit of madness, Mark stabs the owner, accusing her of having defiled Maira. Jacques and Liza see Maira leaving the brothel and enter to find the body, and a man tells them that "Maira" is not the Maira of old, but her 10-year younger sister who the father has brought up magically in Maira's memory and physical likeness, to avenge her death, knowing that Mark would eventually come back.

Mark meets "Maira" on the beach. While they are having sex, she reveals that she is not who he thinks she is, and that he needs to die to avenge Maira's death. Mark walks away towards the sea, kneels down, and cuts off his own penis with a knife, his blood spurting and mixing with the foam. He dies. "Maira" sits down next to him and caresses him.

When Jacques and Lisa find his body there, Jacques says, "That was what Mark wanted. He only wanted to kill himself."

== Cast ==
- Mark Shannon as Mark Lester
- Annj Goren as Maira and her younger sister
- George Eastman as Voyakis

Uncredited:

- Lucia Ramirez as Lucia
- George Du Bren as Jacques De La Penne
- Chantal Kubel as chambermaid at the hotel
- Lola Burdan as Liza Lester, Mark's wife
- Lanfranco Spinola as Paul, the doctor
- Sandy Samuel as dancer at Voyakis' restaurant
- Fernando Arcangeli as dancer
- Erminio Bianchi Fasani as customer at Voyakis' restaurant
- Pino Marocco as customer at Voyakis' restaurant
- Bruno Alias as customer at Voyakis' restaurant

== Production ==
Sesso nero was the last of nine films D'Amato shot in the Dominican Republic in 1978 and 1979. The idea for the film came from George Eastman, who after losing all his money to gambling proposed to D'Amato to write the story and screenplay of a film in a single day, in exchange for a million lire. D'Amato accepted the proposal since the actors, the technicians and the locations of the previous films were still in place and ready to use.

In the official documentation, it is recorded that the production company changed from Fulvia Cin.ca to P.C.M. during the shoot, the latter being Produzioni Cinematografiche Massaccesi, the company founded by D'Amato, for whom this was the first of many films he produced on his own. Actor and screenwriter George Eastman remembers that the budget was 20 million lire.

Shooting began on November 12, 1979. The working titles were Amore ai tropici (literally: "Love in the tropics") and Much more. The film was shot on location in and around Santo Domingo.

== Release ==
=== Censorship ===
The film was first presented to the board of censorship on March 12, 1980 under its title Much more, but was subsequently withdrawn and presented again under its definitive title Sesso nero, under which it passed on May 30, 1980. No cuts were imposed.

=== Theatrical releases ===
In Italy, the film premiered at the cinema "Torino" in Turin on July 1, 1980, in Milan on July 18, and in Rome on July 30. The film's gross was 54.122.000 lire with 21.670 spectators in 8 cities and 62 days. In France, the film passed the board on October 2, 1980 and was distributed to Parisian cinemas in May 1981 under the title Exotic love. In Spain, it passed on March 7, 1984 and was shown in May 1984 to 55.585 spectators under the title Sexo negro.

=== Home video ===
In Italy, the film was released in a softcore version as Foemina (La femmina) by "Golden video" and "Broadcast", and hardcore as Sesso nero by "Cinevideosud" and "Shendene & Moizzi". On DVD, the hardcore version was released by "Stormovie". In Germany, the film's hardcore version was released on VHS by "Benra Kg" and on DVD as Orgasmo nero III. Schwarze Haut auf weißem Sand by "X-rated". In Greece, a shortened softcore version was released on DVD under the title Mavra kormia stin leuki ammo. In the United States, the hardcore version was released by "One 7 Movies" under the title Exotic Malice.

== Reception ==
For Mondo Digital in 2011, Sesso nero "can't be classified as a traditional porn film since it clearly doesn't have the traditional raincoat brigade in mind". In their exhaustive 2014 monograph on early Italian hardcore film production (1980-1984), Andrea Napoli and Franco Grattarola both agreed that Sesso nero was the best and most beautiful film of the Italian "Golden Age" of adult filmmaking.

== Bibliography ==
- Grattarola, Franco; Napoli, Andrea (2014). Luce Rossa. La nascita e le prime fasi del cinema pornografico in Italia. Roma: Iacobelli Editore. ISBN 9788862522137.
- Lupi, Gordiano (2004). Erotismo, orrore e pornografia secondo Joe D'Amato. Mondo Ignoto. ISBN 88-89084-49-9.
- Paul, Louis (2005). Italian Horror Film Directors. McFarland. ISBN 978-0-7864-8749-3.
