= Bedroom Mazurka =

1970 film

- Mazurka på sengekanten
- Directed by: John Hildard
- Based on: novel Mazurka
- Starring: Ole Søltoft
- Release date: 1970
- Country: Denmark
- Language: Danish

Bedroom Mazurka (Danish: Mazurka på sengekanten), also known as Bedside Mazurka, is a 1970 Danish sex comedy film, directed by John Hildard. It is about a virginal school master who is initiated into the world of sex. It was the first of the eight Bedside-films, an erotic film series produced in Denmark between 1970 and 1976, and it was the most popular, and many regard it as the best. All the Bedside-films had many pornographic sex scenes, but were nevertheless considered mainstream films. It was based on the short novel by Danish author Soya, Mazurka.

== Plot ==
The film takes place in the all-boys private boarding school Krabbesøgaard (English: Crab Lake Farm). The rector of the school has been appointed as the new minister of culture.

Because of this, the rector Bosted (Axel Strøbye) needs to find his replacement. The choice falls on the young teacher Mikkelsen (Ole Søltoft), who is popular amongst the students because he wants to convert the boys school into a mixed gender school that also allows girls. However, there is a problem. Mikkelsen is a virgin and school policy dictates that the rector must be a married man. He has thirty days before the new government is officially presented and rector Bosted needs to resign, and in that time he must be engaged, or the position falls to the hated teacher Holst (Paul Hagen) also known as “the doormat”.

The boys, led by the seniors Torben, Vagn, Ole and Michael, that are all already worldly, therefore start on a quest – to help Mikkelsen have sex. With the help of rector Bosted's neglected wife, both the chairman's daughters, and a stripper/prostitute that the boys hire, Mikkelsen starts to gain a better understanding of the fairer sex. But will it be enough to get him a wife in just 30 days, or will "the doormat" end up taking the position?

== Cast ==
- Ole Søltoft
- Axel Strøbye
- Annie Birgit Garde
- Paul Hagen
- Karl Stegger
- Birte Tove
- Christoffer Bro
- Joen Bille
- Arthur Jensen
- Bjørn Spiro
- Søren Strømberg
- Holger Vistisen
- Bent Vejlby
