= Birte Tove =

Danish actress and nude model (1945–2016)

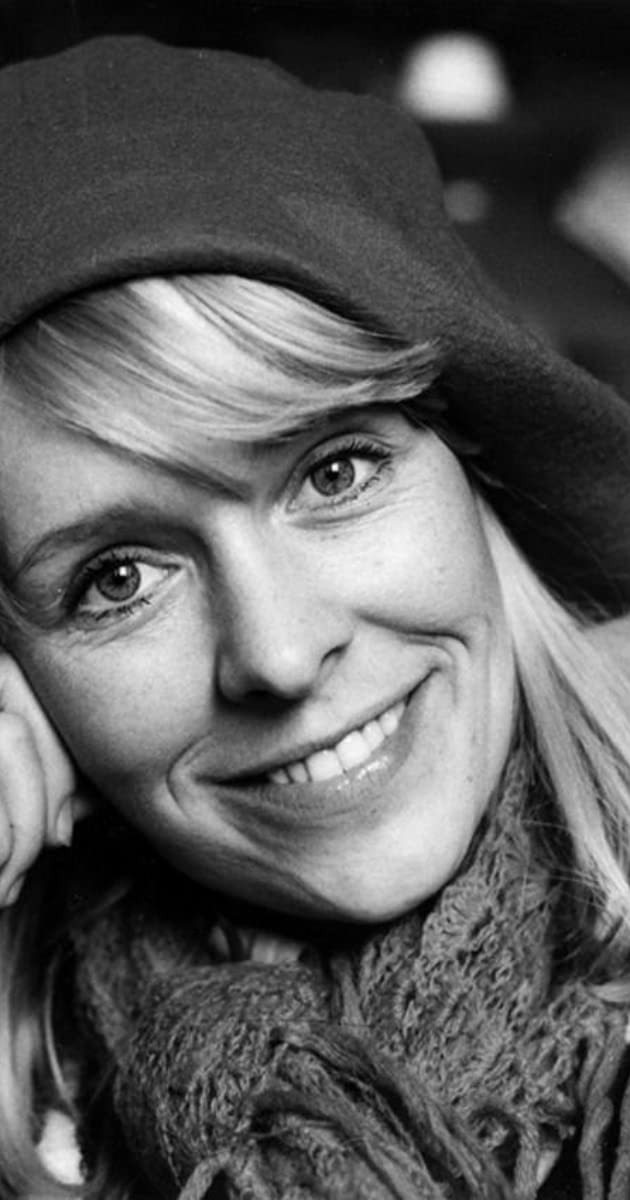
- Tove in 1969
- Born: Birte Tove Sørensen; 16 January 1945; Helsingør, Denmark
- Died: 6 February 2016 (aged 71)
- Resting place: Søllerød Cemetery
- Spouse: Ole Schächter (divorced)
- Children: 2

Birte Tove (née Birte Tove Sørensen; 1945–2016), was a Danish actress and nude model. She is best known for her work in the 1970s Bedside-films (Danish: Sengekantsfilm), an erotic film series produced by A/S Palladium. Her films were popular internationally, and in Hong Kong she was nicknamed, "the Danish Elizabeth Taylor".

Alongside her modeling and acting career, Tove trained as a nurse, and she worked for several years in home care.

== Biography ==
Birte Tove was born on 16 January 1945 in Helsingør, Denmark. She had been married Ole Brix Schächter from October 1970 until 1995, which ended in divorce. Tove was the mother of 2 children, including actors Anne Katrine Tove Brix and Adam Brix Schächter.

In 1967, she first appeared as a model in Ekstra Bladet, a Danish tabloid newspaper. In 1969, Tove had her first acting role in the American–Danish film Swedish Fly Girls (1971; Danish: Christa), where she played a free-spirited flight attendant looking for love. Throughout the 1970s, she starred in many Bedside-films, often alongside actor Ole Søltoft. She lived in Hong Kong from 1972 until 1975, where she worked with the Shaw Brothers Studio and filmed Sexy Girls of Denmark (1973), Bamboo House of Dolls (1973), and The Mini Skirt Gang (1975).

Tove died on 6 February 2016 from multiple sclerosis.

== Filmography ==
=== Film ===
Film
Date	Title	Role	Production	Notes
1970	Bedroom Mazurka	Line, youngest daughter	A/S Palladium	
1971	Swedish Fly Girls	Christa	American International Pictures	
1971	With Love (Danish: Med kærlig hilsen)	Eve		
1971	Bedside Dentist (Danish: Tandlæge på sengekanten)	Nina	A/S Palladium	
1972	Z.P.G.	Nurse	Sagittarius Productions	as Birthe Tove
1972	Bedside Highway (Danish: Motorvej på sengekanten)	Line, apprentice	A/S Palladium	
1973	Between the Sheets (Danish: Romantik på sengekanten)	Bine Hansen	A/S Palladium	
1973	Sexy Girls of Denmark		Shaw Brothers Studio	
1973	Bamboo House of Dolls (pinyin: Nu ji zhong ying)	Jennifer	Shaw Brothers Studio	
1975	The Mini Skirt Gang		Shaw Brothers Studio	
1975	Girls at Arms	Marianne Valdorff		

=== Television ===
Television
Date	Title	Role	Directors	Notes
1994	The Kingdom (miniseries)	Nurse	Lars von Trier, Morten Arnfred	
1997	The Kingdom II, Exodus	Nurse	Lars von Trier, Morten Arnfred	

== See also ==
- List of Danish films of the 1970s
