= Bordellet =

1972 film directed by Ole Ege

- Directed by: Ole Ege
- Written by: Ole Ege
- Produced by: Anders Sandberg
- Starring: Lonny Feddersen, Inger-Lise Gaarde, Gotha Andersen, Leni Kjellander, Ole Ege
- Distributed by: Dansk-Svensk Film (Denmark theatrical), Cambist Films (US theatrical), Alpha Blue Archives (US VHS)
- Release date: 10 July 1972
- Running time: 82 min
- Language: Danish

Bordellet is a 1972 Danish theatrical sex comedy film made by pornographic pioneer Ole Ege and was Denmark's first full-length hardcore pornographic feature film.

The story is set around 1900 and involves a young girl, a brothel, and a hidden treasure.

Typically for Danish hardcore sex comedies of the 1970s, the production was not blocked from hiring people from the mainstream film industry. The crew included cinematographer Morten Arnfred, also known as co-director of the TV miniseries The Kingdom (1994). The cast includes comedian Gotha Andersen, a popular mainstream film and television actor, and popular singer Inger-Lise Gaarde. The film started a decade-long run of Danish hardcore sex comedies.

== Release party ==
At the film's release party, Danish millionaire Simon Spies showed up, took off his clothes and started having sex with members of the film's female cast in front of the press. The resulting photos made front-page news and are still reprinted frequently.

== See also ==
- Bedside-films
- Zodiac-films
