= You Are Not Alone (1978 film) =

- Danish: Du er ikke alene
- Directed by: Ernst Johansen; Lasse Nielsen
- Written by: Lasse Nielsen; Bent Petersen
- Produced by: Steen Herdel
- Starring: Anders Agensø; Peter Bjerg; Ove Sprogøe; Elin Reimer; Jan Jørgensen
- Cinematography: Henrik Herbert
- Edited by: Hanne Hass
- Music by: Sebastian
- Distributed by: Horizon Films (U.S.)
- Release date: 23 February 1978
- Running time: 90 minutes
- Country: Denmark
- Language: Danish

You Are Not Alone (Danish: Du er ikke alene) is a 1978 Danish coming-of-age film written by Lasse Nielsen and Bent Petersen. It was directed by Lasse Nielsen and Ernst Johansen, and produced by Steen Herdel.

The movie stars Anders Agensø, Peter Bjerg, Ove Sprogøe, Elin Reimer and Jan Jørgensen.

== Synopsis ==
The film is set in a Danish all-boys boarding school, and combines three stories: the relationship between the boys attending the school and the teenaged kids of the town; the boys at the school banding together when one of them is expelled; and the sexual relationship between one of the students and the headmaster's son.

Ole is a delinquent who is always getting in trouble. He has previously been warned about putting up nude pictures of women in the dorm room, so in an act of rebellion, he plasters the bathrooms with centerfolds, and ends up getting expelled. His expulsion inspires the other boys to rally around him and stage a boycott, refusing to go to their classes. Ole boy is eventually allowed to return to school so that he may graduate.

There is also the story of Bo and Kim, who is the headmaster's son, who start to explore their feelings and have a romantic relationship. The film ends at the year-end graduation ceremony, with a short film made by the students to illustrate the Biblical commandment "Love they neighbour as thyself", which shows Bo and Kim hugging and kissing.

== Cast ==
- Anders Agensø as Bo
- Peter Bjerg as Kim
- Ove Sprogøe as Kim's father – Forstander
- Elin Reimer as Kim's mother
- Jan Jørgensen as Lærer Jens Carstensen
- Jørn Faurschou as Lærervikar Andersen
- Merete Axelberg as Lærer Mortensen
- John Hahn-Petersen as Lærer Justesen
- Hugo Herrestrup as Conradsen
- Beatrice Palner as Fru Jensen
- Aske Jacoby as Aske
- Ole Meyer as Ole

== Background ==
When director Lasse Nielsen was asked in 2009 if the film could be made today he responded: "No, I don’t believe the film could be made today. We have an unfortunate situation of self-censorship these days". However he also commented on the world's view on homosexuality by stating: "In many ways, there is more tolerance. On YouTube, for example, you can see many young boys 'coming out' as gay. And—at least in Denmark—parents are becoming more accepting. I’m not sure there has been much progress in U.S.A. however, where many young gay teenagers are still driven to suicide because of general and specific social harassment".

== Home media ==
The film was released to DVD and Blu-ray in September 2024 by Altered Innocence.

== Critical analysis and reception ==
=== Analysis ===
Meryl Shriver-Rice argued that while "the film ends at the precise moment that the two boys reveal that they are homosexuals in a tender music video depicting the two boys holding each other in the forest; it does not deal with the psychological aftermath of this reveal; the film presents the concept that homosexuality is not a choice that children make, but the way that they are born. Essentially, the message is: Being gay is inherent, natural, and non-threatening, so it needs to be accepted as a non-issue by society."

=== Reception ===
In his review for Gay Community News, Michael Bronski stated "what the film lacks in complexity, it regains in portraying a sexual innocence that is refreshing and feels authentic; it addresses the questions of children's rights, child sexuality, and adult repression forthrightly, if somewhat naively, and the sexual scenes between the boys are lifelike and caring." Jon Davies from Xtra Magazine wrote overall, it is "an outlandish archival novelty that melds a voyeuristic take on pubescent sexuality with earnest and endearingly hippie-dippy radical politicking and the longing glances of dewy-eyed first romance."

Film critic Janet Maslin wrote "this Danish film has considerably more guile than its characters; everyone is photographed teasingly, but Kim is the particular sex object of the film, though he does little more than smile prettily and pull his shirt off at any opportunity; though the directors do seem intent on generating some interest in the workings of the school and the lives of the other boys, the prurience of their tactics overpowers everything else."

Dwight Gaut of Seattle Gay News opined that "the best thing that can be said for the film is that the acting is very good; the children act just like children and, had they been given a better script, it might have been a successful film; it is a very boring experience." He went on to suggest "the film would have been far better off to look more into their dreams, their problems in defining their roles, the difficulty of growing from a child into an adult, instead, it never rises above their sexual obsessions."

Linda Gross of the Los Angeles Times said the film "is a joyous affirmation of friendly, guilt-free sexual exploration that captures the funny, inquisitive and competitive teenage obsession with sex; where the film goes awry is in its attempt to equate youthful sexual enthusiasm with political activism." She went on to say the director "has elicited natural and winning performances from the boys, non-professionals; in particular, Agenso and Bjerg are attractive and charismatic charmers."

== Allegations of sexual abuse ==
In 2018, six men accused Lasse Nielsen of sexual abuse during the production of You Are Not Alone, and other films he had produced and directed. The allegations led to a two-part documentary by the Danish government-owned broadcast and subscription television station, TV2 titled De misbrugte filmbørn [The abused children]. Nielson responded to the allegations by stating: "Why does it come after 50 years? Isn't it because of the campaign coming from America? And because I'm famous? They could have come when we had made the film."

== See also ==
- Cinema of Denmark
- List of Danish films of the 1970s
- List of coming-of-age stories
- List of teen films
- List of LGBTQ-related films of 1978
