= Leave Us Alone =

1975 Danish drama film

- Danish: La' os være
- Directed by: Ernst Johansen; Lasse Nielsen
- Written by: Carsten Nielsen; Lasse Nielsen
- Produced by: Steen Herdel
- Starring: Anja Bærentzen
- Cinematography: Andreas Fischer-Hansen
- Edited by: Lars Brydesen
- Music by: Lasse Lunderskov; Lars Ørsted
- Distributed by: Kino Film; Obel Film
- Release date: 3 February 1975
- Running time: 82 minutes
- Country: Denmark
- Language: Danish

Leave Us Alone (Danish: La' os være) is a 1975 Danish drama film directed by Ernst Johansen and Lasse Nielsen. The film stars Martin Højmark-Jensen, Ole Meyer, Jens Wagn Rasmussen, Sven Hastel, Kenneth Nielsen and Søren Christiansen.

It was entered into the 25th Berlin International Film Festival. The plot is similar to that of Lord of the Flies: A group of teenagers are stranded on an uninhabited island, and an initially pleasant vacation turns into a nightmare.

== Synopsis ==
A group of adventurous children and teenagers between ten and sixteen years old want to spend the holidays together. However, since the potential chaperones refuse to go on the planned trip, the boys and girls decide to set off on their own. Without supervision, the teenagers make the most of their freedom by causing a riot, breaking into houses, and eventually even stealing a boat to travel to an uninhabited island. But what begins as an exciting and carefree adventure full of flirting, sex, and childish tests of strength increasingly develops into a nightmare as tensions within the group rise inexorably and spiral toward disaster.

== Cast ==
- Martin Højmark-Jensen
- Ole Meyer
- Jens Wagn Rasmussen
- Sven Hastel
- Kenneth Nielsen
- Søren Christiansen
- Tine Jensen
- Anja Bærentzen
- Henrik Rasmussen
- Svend Christensen
- Bo Jensen
- Bjørn Martensen
- Ivan Baumann

== Reception ==
British film historian Peter Cowie wrote that the film "follows the example of Lord of the Flies in analysing the behaviour of a group of children alone on a Danish island; the message of this film in this genre suggest that youngsters will, if left to their own devices, come to terms with life's crucial phases in a more profound and ultimately satisfying way than if they cling without question to their parents’ example."

English film critic David Robinson opined that "it is not entirely clear whether the film is an allegory about society and war, a pedagogical tract, or simply a celebration of pederasty; it is a kind of realist Lord of the Flies, about a party of children who decide to go unaccompanied on their summer holiday when their teachers walk out on them; after they arrive at a deserted island, their boat drifts away, leaving them stranded, to learn about survival, sex, violence, death and war; it has both a weirdness and an accuracy in the relationship of the children that makes it at worst very watchable."

Author Mette Hjort commented that "released in the 1970s at a time of sexual liberation and rebellion, the film was widely applauded in Denmark, by young and older audiences alike, for adopting a youth-centred, anti-authoritarian approach that brought young people's agency and desires to he screen; stills of the film can be found in countless volumes detailing the achievements of Danish cinema, especially in the category of films for and about children and young people."

== Allegations of abuse ==
In 2018, multiple actors, both male and female, involved in the film said they were subjected to sexual abuse during filming. According to the allegations, the abuse was allegedly committed by directors Lasse Nielsen and Ernst Johansen. Nielson responded to the allegations by stating: "Why does it come after 50 years? Isn't it because of the campaign coming from America? And because I'm famous? They could have come when we had made the film." The allegations led to a two-part documentary titled, The Abused Film Children, which detailed the degree and extent of the two alleged paedophiles abuse during the film's production.

== See also ==
- Cinema of Denmark
- List of Danish films of the 1970s
