= Bedside-films =

Film series

The Bedside-films is a series of eight feature films directed by John Hilbard in 1970 to 1976, which forms part of the wave of erotic films from Denmark. The eight films are connected by the Danish word "sengekant" (English: bedside) in the title of each film. They were produced by the film company A/S Palladium, and starred Danish actor Ole Søltoft in all except, Motorvej på sengekanten (English: Bedside Motorway).

== About ==
All the Bedside-films had many pornographic sex scenes, but were nevertheless considered mainstream films. They all had mainstream casts and crews, and were shown in mainstream cinemas and reviewed in national newspapers etc. The first five, made 1970 to 1973, all featured the actress Birte Tove and were "soft-core". The last three, made 1975 and 1976, after the first of the Zodiac-films were released, all included hard-core scenes and shared many actresses with the Zodiac films, such as Anne Bie Warburg, Vivi Rau and Lisbeth Olsen. The actress Annie Birgit Garde features in all the Bedside-films.

Another Danish film company, Happy Film, made a similar series called the Zodiac-films, also starring Ole Søltoft. All of these films had hardcore-scenes, but were nonetheless also considered mainstream-productions, with mainstream casts and crews. The first Danish sex comedies were made in the 1960s, but Ole Ege's Bordellet (1972) was the first to have hardcore sex-scenes.

== List of films ==
There were eight bedside movies in total:

- Mazurka på sengekanten (English: Bedroom Mazurka) (1970), was the first of the eight movies and many regard it as the best.
- Tandlæge på sengekanten (English: Bedside Dentist) (1971)
- Rektor på sengekanten (1972)
- Motorvej på sengekanten (English: Bedside Highway) (1972)
- Romantik på sengekanten (English: Between the Sheets) (1973)
- Der må være en sengekant (1975)
- Hopla på sengekanten (1976)
- Sømænd på sengekanten (1976)

== See also ==
- Zodiac-films
- List of mainstream films with unsimulated sex
