= Marie Allan =

French actress (born 1979)

- Born: Marie Allan; 1979 (age 46–47); France
- Years active: 2000–present

Marie Allan (born 1979) is a French actress. She appeared as a leading actress in Jean-Claude Brisseau's 2006 Cannes Film Festival film Les Anges Exterminateurs.

== Selected filmography ==
Acting Filmography
| Title | Role |
|---|---|
| Anges exterminateurs, Les (aka "Exterminating Angels") (2006) | Stéphanie |
| Saint-Jacques . . . La Mecque (2005) | Sarah |
| Ainsi soit-il (2000) | |
| Le Page de garde (2000) | Marine |
