= Mark Shannon (actor) =

Italian pornographic actor (1939–2018)

- Shannon as Captain Herbier in Porno Holocaust
- Born: Manlio Cersosimo; 8 December 1939; Rome, Italy
- Died: 11 May 2018 (aged 78)
- Other names: Mark Shannon
- Occupation: Film actor
- Years active: 1979-1988
- Notable work: Le porno killers Sesso nero Porno Holocaust; Erotic Nights of the Living Dead

Mark Shannon (born Manlio Cersosimo; 8 December 1939 – 11 May 2018), sometimes also billed as Mark Shanon or Mark Channon, was an Italian pornographic actor active mainly from 1979 to 1988 and cast - often as protagonist - in more than 30 Italian adult films, many of which were produced, lensed and directed by Joe D'Amato. He was the first Italian male protagonist in Italian cinema performing non-simulated sex on screen and has been called the first Italian "pornodivo".

== Early life ==
Mark Shannon was born as Manlio Cersosimo in Rome on December 8, 1939, the son of Vincenzo Cersosimo, a known magistrate and criminal lawyer. He worked at the exchange office of the Bank of Italy from 1965 to 1975 and as a tourist guide.

== Film career (1979-1988) ==
Shannon already appeared in a small role in Vino, whisky e acqua salata (1962), but started his film career starring in Roberto Mauri's Le porno killers (alongside Carmen Russo) and in Joe D'Amato's Caribbean films Porno Holocaust, Erotic Nights of the Living Dead, Hard Sensation, and Sesso nero, all shot in the second half of 1979 and released in 1980 and 1981.

During his film career, he kept working as travel agency correspondent. From 1979 to 1981, he was stationed in Tanzania and only acted in films during breaks, which usually lasted about three months.

Shannon continued to star in many films by Joe D'Amato, but also of Mario Bianchi, Antonio D'Agostino, Sergio Bergonzelli and Claudio Bernabei, until 1983. He had scenes with many notable Italian pornographic actresses, among them Lucia Ramirez, Annj Goren, Marina Frajese, and Moana Pozzi.

Already during, but mostly after Shannon's active period, many of his scenes were reused in other adult productions.

== Later life and death ==
From 1984 to 1988, Shannon was correspondent for "International Travel Dixie Bird", after which he returned to Italy, working in tourism until 2004.

Shannon occasionally appeared in cameo roles on Italian television and made a last appearance in a film made for theatrical distribution, Giovanni Veronesi's L'ultima ruota del carro (2013).

For the blu-ray Erotic Nights of the Living Dead released by Code Red on June 15, 2018, in the United States, Mark Shannon gave a 20-minute interview in which he talked about his experiences as hardcore pornographic actor and how they came to affect his life both during his active time and beyond.

Mark Shannon died in the first half of 2018, aged 78. His death wasn't reported until late June.

== Bibliography ==
- Grattarola, Franco; Napoli, Andrea (2014). Luce Rossa. La nascita e le prime fasi del cinema pornografico in Italia. Roma: Iacobelli Editore. ISBN 9788862522137.
