= Carl Erik Soya =

Danish writer (1896–1983)

- Born: Carl Erik Martin Soya-Jensen; 30 October 1896; Copenhagen, Denmark
- Died: 10 November 1983 (aged 87)
- Occupation: Writer
- Writing career
- Pen name: Soya
- Genres: Novel, Short Story; Stage play, Satire

Carl Erik Soya (30 October 1896 – 10 November 1983), also known by the single appellation Soya, was a Danish author and dramatist. His works were often satirical provocations against double standards and dishonesty. In 1975, Soya received Denmark's foremost literary award, Grand Prize of the Danish Academy.

== Early life ==
Carl Erik Martin Soya-Jensen was born in Copenhagen, Denmark on 30 October 1896, the son of the painter and professor Carl Martin Soya-Jensen. His parents died when he was a young boy. The inheritance he received provided Soya with financial independence and enabled him to pursue a career as a writer. In 1915, Soya entered the Metropolitan School in Copenhagen, and received his diploma the following year. He began his career as a freelance journalist for Vore Damer (Our Ladies) writing under the American pseudonyms Lillian D. Green, Martin Arrowhead, and Joseph W. French. In 1920, he changed his name to the single appellation, Soya.

== Career ==
Soya published his first book in 1923 – a collection of philosophical stories titled Kvinderne i Persien (The Women of Persia) – which revealed his satirical style and quickly earned him a reputation as a provocateur. In 1929, Soya wrote his first stage play, Parasitterne (The Parasites), which was later produced at the Royal Danish Theatre in 1945.

Soya was the first Danish dramatist to attack fascism when he wrote the satirical farce Umbabumba skifter forfatning (Umbabumba changes its Constitution) in 1935. Then during World War II, in 1942, he wrote En Gæst (A Guest) another sharp satire aimed against the German occupation of Denmark, for which he received a 60-day prison sentence. In 1943, he continued his attack with the satire Min Farmors Hus (made into the 1984 film My Granny's House), and again Soya was sent to prison by the German authorities. After his release from the Horserød Work Camp, Soya went to the State Ministry and slapped the National Censor Karl Eskelund across the face.” He then fled to Sweden.

Soya was a prolific writer and published in a variety of forms including novels, short stories, poems, stage plays, teleplays and collections of aphorisms. Several of his works have been adapted to screen including the 1965 coming-of-age sex comedy Sytten (Erik Soya's '17') and the 1948 romantic drama Jenny and the Soldier which won the Bodil Award for Best Danish Film. During his life, Soya was supported by more than 20 grants and prizes. In 1975, Soya was awarded the Grand Prize from the Det Danske Academi, the foremost literary prize in Denmark.

== Personal life ==
Soya was married in 1919 to Esther Sættem but they divorced two years later. He married a second time in 1925 with Agnes Augusta Zaar. He died on 10 November 1983 at the age of 87 and was buried in a common grave at Mariebjerg Church Cemetery in Gentofte, Denmark.

== Awards and grants ==
Soya was the recipient of numerous monetary prizes. Among his greatest awards were a knighthood in the Order of the Dannebrog in 1948, the 1971 Ingenio et Arti Medal and the 1975 Grand Prize from The Danish Academy.

- 1931 Emma Bærentzen Grant
- 1937 Astrid Goldschmidt Grant
- 1940 Holger Drachmann Grant
- 1940 The Ancker Grant
- 1945 Jeanne and Henri Nathansen Grant
- 1947 Otto Benzon Writer's Grant
- 1947 Holberg Medal
- 1948 Order of the Dannebrog
- 1949 Henrik Pontoppidan Memorial Grant
- 1950 Herman Bang Memorial Grant
- 1952 Tørsleff & Co Literary Honor
- 1954 Jeanne and Henri Nathansen Memorial Grant
- 1956 Colleague Prize for Blodrødt og blegrødt
- 1961 Adam Oehlenschläger Grant
- 1962 Alexander Foss Award
- 1963 Jeanne and Henri Nathansen Memorial Grant
- 1968 Johannes Ewald Grant
- 1971 Ingenio et Arti Medal
- 1971 Otto Rung Writer's Grant
- 1975 The Danish Academy Grand Prize
- 1978 Adam Oehlenschläger Grant

== Bibliography ==
- Kvinderne i Persien og andre Æventyr (1923) (short stories)
- Parasitterne (1929) (stageplay)
- Ganske almindelige mennesker (1930) (short stories)
- Jeg kunne nemt ta' 100 Kroner (1931) (novella)
- Hvem er jeg? eller Naar Fanden gi'r et Tilbud (1932) (stage play)
- Umbabumba skifter forfatning (1933) (stage play)
- Den leende Jomfru (1934) (stage play)
- Lord Nelson lægger Figenbladet eller En Nat i et Vokskabinet (1934) (stage play)
- Fristelsen (1935) (stage play)
- Handlingen foregår i Danmark (1936) (short stories)
- Avner for Vinden (1937) (stage play)
- Maalet, Troen og Synspunktet. Det nye Spil om Enhver (1938) (stage play)
- Min høje Hat (1939) (stage play)
- Brudstykker af et Mønster (1940) (stage play; filmed in 1947 as Jenny and the Soldier)
- Smaa venlige Smaafisk (1940) (short stories)
- En Gæst (1941) (novel)
- Min farmors hus (1943) (novel; filmed in 1984) aka ‘’Grandmother’s House”; English trans. by Agnes Camilla Hansen, as "Farmor's House," 1964, Borgen's Publishing House, Denmark
- To Traade (1943) (stage play)
- 30 Aars Henstand (1944) (stage play)
- 33 Kunstnerportrætter (1945)
- Indfald og udfald (1945) (collection of aphorisms)
- Efter (1947) (stage play; Filmed in 1948 as 3 År Efter (Three Years Later))
- Mani (1947) (screenplay)
- Frit Valg (1948) (stage play)
- Hjerte og smerte (1949) (poems)
- Løve med korset (stage play)
- Tanker om kvinder, kærlighed og det (1953) (collection of aphorisms)
- Sytten I-III (1953) (novel; Filmed in 1965 as 17) aka Seventeen: Parts One, Two and Three
- Blodrødt og blegrødt (1955) (short stories)
- Lommeuld. 344 indfald og udfald (1955) (collection of aphorisms)
- I den lyse nat (1956) (stage play)
- Petersen i Dødsriget (1957) (stage play)
- Vilhelms bibel. 586 indfald og udfald (1957) (collection of aphorismsr)
- Parasitterne (1958) (teleplay)
- Tilegnet Boccaccio. Syv pornografiske fortællinger (1959) (novel; filmed in 1970 as Bedroom Magic; filmed in 1972 as Bedside Head)
- De sidste. 661 indfald og udfald (1960) (collection of aphorisms)
- Platinkorn eller De allersidste. 339 indfald og udfald (1963) (collection of aphorisms)
- En tilskuer i Spanien. Fire breve fra Ibiza (1963)
- Familien Danmark (1964) (stage play)
- Vraggods (1965) (stage play)
- Tilegnet Gud. Syv brutale fortællinger (1966)
- Afdøde Jonsen (1966) (Filmed in 1969 as Damernes Ven (The Ladies' Friend))
- Bare en tagsten (1966) (Filmed in 1967 as A Bump on the Head and Soya's Tagsten)
- Brevet. Et levnedsløb fortalt for TV i fem afdelinger (1966) (television)
- Lutter øre (1968) (stageplay)
- Familien Kristensen (1970) (stageplay)
- Potteskår (1970) (memoirs)
- Mazurka på sengekanten (1970) (screenplay...aka Bedroom Magic)
- Åndværkeren (1972) (memoirs)
- Ærlighed koster mest (1975) (memoirs)
