= John Hahn-Petersen =

Danish actor (1930–2006)

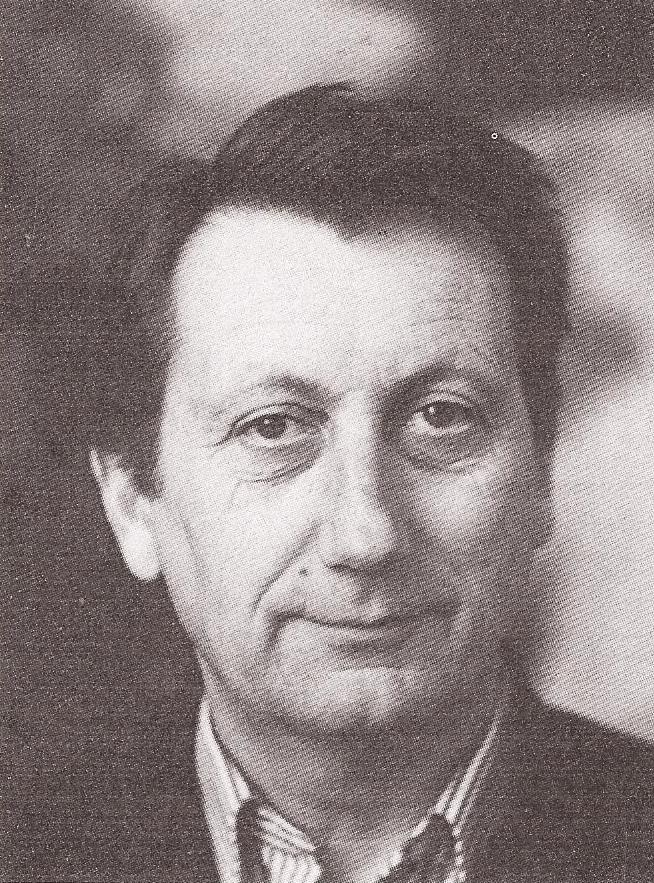
John Hahn-Petersen

John Hahn-Petersen (4 November 1930 in Frederiksberg – 4 January 2006) was a Danish theatre, TV and movie actor. He made his debut in 1955 and starred in a number of productions, including Matador, Landsbyen, and Taxa.

In 2006 he had one of the leading roles in Henri Nathansen's Indenfor Murene at Det Kongelige Teater, Denmark. He died at the age of 75 of a heart attack, shortly before he was to appear on stage. Following his death Indenfor Murene was cancelled.

== Filmography ==
=== Film ===
- Lyssky transport gennem Danmark – 1958
- Styrmand Karlsen – 1958
- Tro, håb og trolddom – 1960
- Dyden går amok – 1966
- Olsen-banden på sporet – 1975
- Du er ikke alene – 1978
- Olsen-banden overgiver sig aldrig – 1979
- Historien om Kim Skov – 1981
- Thorvald og Linda – 1982
- Det parallelle lig – 1982
- Oviri – 1986
- Barndommens gade – 1986
- Baby Doll – 1988
- Retfærdighedens rytter – 1989
- De nøgne træer – 1991
- Høfeber – 1991
- Jesus vender tilbage – 1992
- Sofie – 1992
- Sort høst – 1993
- Balladen om Holger Danske – 1996
- Nonnebørn – 1997
- Riget II – 1997
- Forbudt for børn – 1998
- Humørkort-stativ-sælgerens søn – 2002

=== Television ===
- Matador – 1978-81
- Landsbyen – 1991-96
- Gøngehøvdingen – 1992
- Alletiders jul – 1994
- TAXA – 1997-99
- Krøniken – 2002-06
- Forsvar – 2003-04
