= Golden shower =

Golden shower may refer to:

== Arts and media ==
- Golden Shower (band), a Brazilian duo
- The Golden Shower, a 1919 American silent film directed by John W. Noble
- "Golden Shower", a song by German/Swedish industrial metal supergroup Lindemann
- "Golden Showers", a song by shock rock band The Mentors

== Plants ==
- Golden shower tree, a common name for the ornamental tree Cassia fistula
- Golden shower orchid, a common name for Oncidim
- "Showers of Gold" or "golden showers", one of the common plant names for:
  - Tristellateia australasiae
  - Galphimia glauca
  - Galphimia gracilis
  - Senecio tamoides

== Other uses ==
- Golden shower (urolagnia), a slang term for the practice of urinating on another person for sexual pleasure
