= Bedside Dentist =

1971 Danish erotic film

- Directed by: John Hilbard
- Screenplay by: John Hilbard, Finn Henriksen
- Based on: novel by Soya
- Produced by: Finn Henriksen
- Starring: Ole Søltoft, Birte Tove, Annie Birgit Garde
- Release date: September 3, 1971
- Running time: 103 minutes
- Country: Denmark
- Box office: SEK 4.8 million (Sweden)

Bedside Dentist (Danish: Tandlæge på sengekanten), is a 1971 Danish erotic comedy film and part of the Bedside-films series, directed by John Hilbard from a screenplay by John Hilbard and Finn Henriksen, and produced by Finn Henriksen. The film highlighted, in parody, two versions of Danish masculinity. The film was released in the UK as Danish Dentist on the Job.

== Plot ==
A rich woman (Annie Birgit Garde) wants to endow her nephew (Ole Søltoft), who is a dental student, with a large fortune and her company. As she wants to make sure that he is a "real man", "into beer, pussy and horn music", before passing the estate on to him, she hires a prostitute. Rumors spread about her nephew's wealth, and women show interest.

== Cast ==
- Ole Søltoft as dental student Thomas
- Birte Tove as Nina
- Annie Birgit Garde as aunt Benedikte Swane-Hansen
- Carl Ottosen as professor Andreas Henningsen
- Soren Stromberg as Michael

== Box office ==
The film was successful in Sweden with a gross of SEK 4.8 million.
