= Secret Things =

2002 film by Jean-Claude Brisseau

- Theatrical release poster
- French: Choses secrètes
- Directed by: Jean-Claude Brisseau
- Written by: Jean-Claude Brisseau
- Produced by: Jean Francois Geneix
- Starring: Coralie Revel; Sabrina Seyvecou; Roger Mirmont; Fabrice Deville; Blandine Bury; Olivier Soler; Viviane Théophildès; Dorothée Picard
- Cinematography: Wilfrid Sempe
- Edited by: María Luisa García
- Music by: Xavier Pirouselle
- Production companies: Les Aventuriers de l'Image; La Sorcière Rouge; CNC
- Distributed by: Rezo Films; Officine UBU (Italy)
- Release date: 16 October 2002 (France)
- Running time: 115 minutes
- Country: France
- Language: French

Secret Things (French: Choses secrètes) is a 2002 French erotic drama film written and directed by Jean-Claude Brisseau, starring Coralie Revel and Sabrina Seyvecou. The film is sometimes associated with the New French Extremity. Cahiers du Cinéma named Secret Things, jointly along with Ten by director Abbas Kiarostami, as the best film of 2002. The film was awarded the French Cineaste of the Year title at the 2003 Cannes Film Festival. In 2005, Brisseau was found guilty of sexually harassing two actresses between 1999 and 2001 during auditions for the film.

== Plot ==
Two Parisian girls, Nathalie, a stripper at a bar, and Sandrine, a bartender, conspire to climb the social ladder of Paris when they start living together.

The club owner gives Sandrine an ultimatum to have sex with a paying client. Nathalie, after finishing her shift, defends and dissuades Sandrine from accepting the offer, and both girls are fired. Sandrine, after falling behind on her rent, is sure that the landlord will kick her out especially since she is unemployed, but Nathalie offers to share her apartment with Sandrine for a while.

The girls decide to climb the corporate ladder by exploiting their sex appeal and get jobs as secretaries in a banking corporation. Sandrine is sent to HQ, and Nathalie is sent to Human Resource Department. They aim to seduce their bosses and get promoted, which Sandrine accomplishes with co-founder Monsieur Delacroix after becoming his secretary, but much ambiguity surrounds Nathalie.

Christophe, the CEO's son and future heir to the banking corporation, is very handsome and the final target for both girls to seduce, but his reputation is devastating. Having gone through many women, Christophe is ruthless and seemingly emotionless yet has the capability to seduce any woman and make her fall madly in love with him. This resulted in previous romances ending with their suicide. Yet Sandrine still is determined to conquer him even after receiving a warning from Nathalie.

Over time, Sandrine, through absenteeism and reduced attention towards Delacroix, convinces him to have Nathalie transferred to his office as an assistant secretary to Sandrine since she feels overworked. The result is a threesome that evening in the office that Christophe and his sister interrupt. After being covertly disciplined, Delacroix will retain his job title and continue to work for the company, but, officially, on paper (to which only Christophe has access) he has been fired.

After the situation, Christophe takes Nathalie and Sandrine to a private restaurant, where it is revealed that Nathalie has been Christophe's secret lover while the girls had been working at the bank. After flaunting his wealth, Christophe reveals his plan: to marry Sandrine with a formal wedding to convince his dying father that he is a reformed man and thus will gain complete control over the corporation. Sandrine will divorce after with a healthy settlement. Nathalie, enraged by the situation, does not resist in hope that Christophe loves her, even obeying his command for her and Sandrine to go to the toilets and start having sex before awaiting Christophe to turn it into a threesome.

Later on, Sandrine is invited to Christophe's chateau for an evening of dinner with him and his sister in an incestuous threesome. The evening is interrupted by Nathalie, who still believes blindly that Christophe loves her deep down. After Christophe rejects her and throws a stone at her, Nathalie succumbs to madness. The wedding is carried out at a later date and during the wedding night Sandrine and Christophe walk together through his château as an orgy ensues. Guards escort her to the cellar upon hearing that Christophe's father has died and left him the entire corporation. There, she is gang raped by guests whilst Christophe and his sister engage in sexual intercourse.

Later on in the evening when the events have settled down, Sandrine is thrown out in front of the main door and told by Christophe that the divorce may take several weeks. Nathalie appears with a jerrycan full of petrol that she pours over herself and holds a lighter in the air. Christophe dismisses her only to be shot several times by Nathalie in her rage. She is jailed and Sandrine becomes the heir to the corporation. Years later when Sandrine is entering her limousine on the streets of Paris she recognises Nathalie, who has since married her jail guard and had a child. Nathalie and Sandrine walk over to each other and kiss each other on the cheek.

== Cast ==
- Coralie Revel as Nathalie
- Sabrina Seyvecou as Sandrine
- Roger Mirmont as Delacroix
- Fabrice Deville as Christophe
- Blandine Bury as Charlotte
- Olivier Soler as Cadene
- Viviane Théophildès as Mrs Mercier
- Dorothée Picard as Delacroix's mother

== Reception ==
=== Critical response ===
On review aggregator Rotten Tomatoes, the film holds an approval rating of 50% based on 50 reviews, with an average rating of 5.63/10. The website's critics consensus reads: "Pretentious and trashy." On Metacritic, the film has a weighted average score of 55 out of 100, based on 20 critics, indicating "mixed or average reviews".

Lisa Nesselson of Variety wrote that the film can be enjoyed by both scholars and exploitation film fans, who she says were probably seeking a film like this when they watched Eyes Wide Shut. Roger Ebert of the Chicago Sun-Times rated it three out of four stars and wrote that it is "a rare item these days: An erotic film made well enough to keep us interested", though he said it is not the best film of the year. Dave Kehr of The New York Times compared the film's bluntness negatively to the work of Éric Rohmer and said it is more interested in titillation than intellectualism; however, he wrote, "But there is no denying the force of Mr. Brisseau's bizarre imagination and the personal conviction he brings to it."

Mick LaSalle of the San Francisco Chronicle rated it two out of four stars and wrote that the film's excessive focus on sex "numbs the audience" but it never becomes boring. Allison Benedikt of the Chicago Tribune rated it two out of four stars and called it "a trashy porno pretending to be deep". Benedikt concluded that the repeated sex scenes cause the film to become boring despite the "disturbing and arousing moments". Ty Burr of The Boston Globe wrote that the film "hints at a place where desire, fear, pleasure, and power all intersect, but it never actually goes there". Tom Dawson stated in his review for the BBC, "If the stylised Secret Things can be seen as both a tale of female empowerment and a class allegory, it still resembles a voyeuristic male fantasy in its depictions of lesbian sex, threesomes, stripteases and public masturbation."
