= The Exterminating Angels =

2006 film by Jean-Claude Brisseau

- Theatrical release poster
- French: Les Anges exterminateurs
- Directed by: Jean-Claude Brisseau
- Written by: Jean-Claude Brisseau
- Produced by: Milena Poylo; Gilles Sacuto
- Starring: Frédéric van den Driessche; Maroussia Dubreuil; Lise Bellynck; Marie Allan
- Cinematography: Wilfrid Sempé
- Edited by: María Luisa García
- Music by: Jean Musy
- Production companies: La Sorcière Rouge; TS Productions
- Distributed by: Rézo Films
- Release dates: 20 May 2006 (Cannes); 13 September 2006 (France)
- Running time: 100 minutes
- Country: France
- Language: French
- Box office: $154,210

The Exterminating Angels (French: Les Anges exterminateurs) is a 2006 French erotic drama film written and directed by Jean-Claude Brisseau. It was screened at the Cannes Film Festival on 20 May 2006 and received a limited release in the United States on 7 March 2007. The film is about a director named François who embarks on a film project about female eroticism. He meets three struggling actresses who perform sexual acts in front of him. What François does not realise is that there is a lot more going on in the girls' heads than other parts and this leads to tragic consequences.

The film is semi-autobiographical; in 2002, director Brisseau had been arrested on charges of harassment, fined and given a suspended one-year prison sentence. The plaintiffs were three women who had performed sexual acts in front of him during their audition.

The soundtrack for the film was composed by Jean Musy.

== Cast ==
- Frédéric van den Driessche as François
- Maroussia Dubreuil as Charlotte
- Lise Bellynck as Julie
- Marie Allan as Stéphanie
- Raphaële Godin as Apparition 1 / Rebecca
- Margaret Zenou as Apparition 2
- Sophie Bonnet as Nathalie
- Jeanne Cellard as the grandmother
- Virginie Legeay as Virginie
- Estelle Galarme as Olivia
- Marine Danaux as Agnès
- Apolline Louis as Céline
- François Négret as Stéphanie's friend

== Production ==
On 31 October 2007, two actresses, one of whom stars in The Exterminating Angels, accused Brisseau of rape, sexual assault and harassment for a period from August 2005 to September 2007. Marie Allan, then aged 29, accused the director of having abused her during erotic "castings", carried out face to face and without a camera, in public places or at Brisseau's home. According to her, Brisseau would have promised a leading role in one of his films and asked for that to work these intimate scenes. The same accusations came from another actress, then aged 21, who said she suffered a "digital" rape by the filmmaker. Brisseau only admitted to having had a consensual sexual relationship with the first actress. A judicial investigation was opened, the man was heard as an assisted witness, but the procedure was abandoned for lack of evidence to establish "non-consent".

== Reception ==
On the review aggregator website Rotten Tomatoes, 49% of 45 critics' reviews are positive, with an average rating of 5.6/10. The website's consensus reads: "Explicit and shocking, but there is no substance or statement on human behavior underneath the taboo-breaking." Metacritic, which uses a weighted average, assigned the film a score of 54 out of 100, based on 16 critics, indicating "mixed or average" reviews.
