= Anders Agensø =

Danish actor (born 1961)

Anders Agensø is a Danish actor, born 1961 in Denmark.

== Films ==
- You Are Not Alone 1978
