= Yves Jeannin =

French chemist (born 1931)

Yves Jeannin is a French chemist born on 11 April 1931 in Boulogne sur Seine. He is the son of Raymond Jeannin, architect, and Suzanne Armynot du Chatelet. He married Suzanne Bellé in 1956 and has two children, Philippe and Sylvie, born in 1961 and 1969.

He is a corresponding member of the French Academy of sciences and Professor Emeritus at the Pierre and Marie Curie University.

== Biography ==
Yves Jeannin studied at the École Nationale Supérieure de Chimie de Paris (Engineer in 1954, graduation rank: first). His first job was at the IRSID for a sixteen-month stay in London at the Royal School of Mines with Prof. F.D. Richardson. He worked on the thermodynamics of the oxidation of iron-chromium alloys. He is preparing a PhD thesis in Physical Sciences (1962) under the supervision of Pr J. Bénard, on the crystallochemistry of titanium sulphides. In 1963, he spent a period in the United States as a Post-doctoral Research Associate of the United States Atomic Energy Commission, Argonne National Laboratory, and Iowa State University.

He became a lecturer at the Paul Sabatier University of Toulouse in 1964, then Professor at the Pierre and Marie Curie University, Paris (UPMC), in 1974 where he taught in preparation for the medical school entrance examination at the Pitié-Salpétrière Hospital, in inorganic chemistry, the Master of Chemistry at UPMC, the Master of Chemistry at L'École Normale Supérieure, the Advanced Study Diploma (DEA) in inorganic chemistry, the DEA in crystallography, the preparation for the agrégation in chemistry at L'École Normale Supérieure.

Jeannin became head of the Chemistry group of the Lagarrigue Commission in charge of rebuilding the chemistry curricula of high schools (1976-1980). He was a member of the jury for the agrégation examination in chemistry (1971-1974), a member of the jury for admission to the École Normale Supérieure (9 years), and a member of the jury for admission to the École Polytechnique (2 years). At the request of the Ministry, he took part in the setting up of the internal agrégation in Physical Sciences (President of the jury, 1985-1988). He is a member of the Commission proposing to the Minister the General Inspectors, member of the recruitment jury of the Engineers of the Corps of Mines. He will also be a chargé de mission at the French Ministry of Research (4 years).

Jeannin is a member of the University's Scientific Council, President of the Research Commission of the UFR of Chemistry, and a member of the Academic Council of the École Normale Supérieure.

== Scientific work ==
In research, Jeannin shows an interest in the chemistry of transition metals, in the synthesis and structure of the species they form. First in solid state chemistry with the study of the non-stoichiometry of binary and ternary chalcogenides of titanium and zirconium, then he studies the iron complexes formed by solvation in non-aqueous media, the synthesis and X-ray study of organometallic polymetallic species, and finally the chemistry of polyoxotungstates. In the latter case, it is essentially the compounds containing the XW9 brick that have attracted his attention. The laboratory has made a major contribution to the development of their synthesis and structural study by X-ray and NMR of tungsten, holding the record for the largest known polytungstate. In organometallic chemistry, study of the action of aminoalkynes and thioalkynes on iron carbonyl and ruthenium carbonyl; cluster compounds of up to five iron atoms have been isolated. He has also been interested in the coordination chemistry of copper and molybdenum. In order to carry out this research on the creation of a centre for structure determination by X-ray diffraction, he was made available to French and foreign chemists and to external laboratories.

This research has resulted in more than 300 publications.

== Honours and distinctions ==
- Member then Chairman of the Inorganic Chemistry Nomenclature Commission of the International Union of Pure and Applied Chemistry (IUPAC)
- Member of the IUPAC Bureau, then President (1989-1991)
- Correspondent of the French Academy of sciences (1980) (member of the Sealed Folds Commission, the Philosophy and History of Science Commission, the Metrology Commission, President of the French Committee of International Scientific Unions - COFUSI)
- Doctor Honoris Causa of the University of Leeds (1990)
- Winner of the Alexander von Humboldt Prize (1990)
- Visiting Professor at the Universities of Hamburg, Heidelberg and Munich (Technische Universität)
- Chevalier in the Ordre National du Mérite, Officier of the Ordre des Palmes Académiques
