= Swedish Fly Girls =

- Directed by: Jack O'Connell
- Produced by: Jack O'Connell
- Starring: Birte Tove
- Music by: Mose Henry
- Distributed by: American International Pictures (US)
- Release date: 20 August 1971
- Running time: 99 minutes
- Country: Denmark
- Languages: Danish, English

Swedish Fly Girls is a 1971 Danish drama film, also known as Christa. The English title is misleading, since the lead character, Christa, is Danish rather than Swedish.

== Plot ==
Christa is a 23-year old Danish single mother, who as a stewardess meets many men. While she enjoys her promiscuity and carefree, urban single lifestyle, Christa seeks marriage with a man who will accept both her and her son Rolf, who lives with her parents.

As Christa forms temporary relationships with an Italian businessman (who does not want to be a stepfather), an American artist (who wants an open marriage), and a French conductor (who tells her that he is too dedicated to music to give her what she wants), a private detective follows her. Torben, wealthy and reckless heir to a family fortune and Rolf's father, tried to force Christa to abort their son. He insists to her that she will return to him and secretly builds a library of dossiers on her lovers, while his business empire collapses from overaggressive expansion.

London lawyer Derek is Christa's most serious relationship; she accepts his proposal, and plans to move to Australia with him. Torben threatens to use the dossiers and his greater financial resources to gain custody of Rolf, forcing her to end the engagement. After his last hope for saving his company fails, however, Torben commits suicide in front of Christa. The film ends with Derek, Christa, and Rolf reuniting at the nude beach.

== Cast ==
- Birte Tove as Christa
- Baard Owe as Torben
- Clinton Greyn as Derek
- Daniel Gélin as Andre
