= Zodiac-films =

Series of erotic films

The Zodiac-films is a series of six feature films from 1973 to 1978, which forms part of the wave of erotic films from Denmark.

The Six films are connected by a zodiac-starsign in the title of each film. They were produced by the film company Happy Film. The first film was directed by Finn Karlsson, the five others by Werner Hedman. All six starred Danish actor Ole Søltoft.

All the Zodiac-films had many hardcore pornographic sex scenes, but were nevertheless considered mainstream films. They all had mainstream casts and crews, and were shown in mainstream cinemas and reviewed in national newspapers etc.

Another Danish film company, Palladium, made a similar series called the Bedside-films, also starring Ole Søltoft. The Zodiac-films were to some extent a sexually more explicit copy of the Bedside-films. The first Danish sex comedies were made in the 1960s, but Ole Ege's Bordellet (1972) was the first to have hardcore sex-scenes.

== The Zodiac-films ==
1. I Jomfruens tegn (Finn Karlsson, 1973) (Virgo)
2. I Tyrens tegn (Werner Hedman, 1974) (Taurus)
3. I Tvillingernes tegn (Werner Hedman, 1975) (Gemini)
4. I Løvens tegn (Werner Hedman, 1976) (Leo)
5. Agent 69 Jensen i Skorpionens tegn (Werner Hedman, 1977) (Scorpio)
6. Agent 69 Jensen i Skyttens tegn (Werner Hedman, 1978) (Sagittarius)

== See also ==
- Bedside-films
- List of mainstream films with unsimulated sex
