= Jean-Claude Brisseau =

French film director and screenwriter

- Born: 17 July 1944; Paris, France
- Died: 11 May 2019 (aged 74); Paris, France
- Occupation: Film director
- Years active: 1975–2019

Jean-Claude Brisseau (French: [bʁiso]; 17 July 1944 – 11 May 2019) was a French filmmaker best known for his 2002 film Secret Things ("Choses Secrètes") and his 2006 film The Exterminating Angels ("Les Anges exterminateurs").

== Career ==
Brisseau's 1992 film Céline was nominated for the Golden Bear Award at the 42nd Berlin International Film Festival.

At the Cannes Film Festival, he was awarded the France Culture Award in 2003 for Secret Things; in 1988 he was awarded the Special Award for the Youth.

He was formerly a professor at La Fémis in Paris.

== Personal life ==
In 2002, Brisseau was arrested on charges of sexual harassment after three women came forward accusing him of cajoling them into performing sexual acts on camera by promising them a film role. He was eventually found guilty, fined and given a suspended one-year prison sentence. Brisseau made a semi-autobiographical film in 2006 about this incident, Les Anges Exterminateurs. On 31 October 2007, two actresses, one of whom stars in The Exterminating Angels, accused Brisseau of rape, sexual assault and harassment for a period from August 2005 to September 2007. Marie Allan, then aged 29, accused the director of having abused her during erotic "castings", carried out face to face and without a camera, in public places or at Brisseau's home. According to her, Brisseau would have promised a leading role in one of his films and asked for that to work these intimate scenes. The same accusations came from another actress, then aged 21, who said she suffered a "digital" rape by the filmmaker. Brisseau only admitted to having had a consensual sexual relationship with the first actress. A judicial investigation was opened, the man was heard as an assisted witness, but the procedure was abandoned for lack of evidence to establish "non-consent".

Brisseau died in Paris on 11 May 2019 at the age of 74.

== Filmography ==
- Dimanche après-midi (1967)
- Des jeunes femmes disparaissent (1973) (Short film black and white)
- La Croisée des chemins (1975)
- Médiumnité (Mediumship) (1978) (https://www.youtube.com/watch?v=_5ezDPMg_28 [archive])
- La vie comme ça (Life The Way It Is) (1978)
- Un jeu brutal (A Brutal Game) (1983)
- De bruit et de fureur (Sound and Fury) (1988)
- Noce blanche (White Wedding) (1989)
- Céline (1992)
- L'Ange Noir (The Black Angel) (1994)
- Les Savates du bon Dieu (Workers for the Good Lord) (2000)
- Choses Secrètes (Secret Things) (2002)
- Les Anges Exterminateurs (Exterminating Angels) (2006)
- À l'aventure (2008)
- La fille de nulle part (The Girl from Nowhere) (2012)
- Des jeunes femmes disparaissent (2014) (Short film. Remake of the first in 1973)
- Que le diable nous emporte (2018)
