= Erotic Nights of the Living Dead =

- Italian theatrical release poster
- Directed by: Joe D'Amato
- Written by: Joe D'Amato
- Starring: Laura Gemser; George Eastman
- Cinematography: Joe D'Amato
- Edited by: Ornella Micheli
- Music by: Marcello Giombini
- Distributed by: Variety Distribution
- Release date: 1980 (Italy)
- Running time: 112 minutes
- Country: Italy
- Language: Italian

Erotic Nights of the Living Dead (Italian: Le notti erotiche dei morti viventi) is a 1980 Italian erotic horror film written and directed by Joe D'Amato. It was filmed in and around Santo Domingo. Like many films by D'Amato; the title was written as a tongue in cheek play on another film, with this one referencing the Night of the Living Dead series of films. The movie received mixed to negative reviews upon release, but an upscaled & updated new release of the film was released on DVD decades later.

== Plot ==
On his second visit to the Dominican Republic, John Wilson, a land developer for a foreign company planning to build a hotel, leases a tropical island from the government, which - unbeknownst to him - carries a voodoo curse. He plans to go there to survey the land. At night, he has sex in his hotel room with two prostitutes, whom he scares away by mentioning the name Cat Island. In the hall, he meets Fiona, a socialite who - as she tells him - has just left her elderly lover and his yacht. He performs cunnilingus on her.

Sea captain Larry O'Hara spends the same night on his skipper, having sex with Liz, the local nightclub owner. Just as they are about to leave, Liz spots a zombie walking in the shallow water of the port, his hand outstretched towards them. O’Hara kills him with a grappling iron. Later in the morgue, the doctor examines the maggot-ridden corpse, which suddenly grabs him, kills him with a gory bite in the neck, and walks away.

The next day, Wilson hires O’Hara to take him and Fiona for the trip to the island. O’Hara tells him about the legend surrounding the island, about zombies led by a cat. At night, in Liz's empty nightclub, Liz gets on stage and dances for O’Hara, uncorking a bottle of champagne with her vagina. In his room with Fiona, Wilson suddenly feels someone's unseen presence. It is Luna's, who sits on the island graveyard and establishes contact with him, scratching her hand until her green blood shows. O'Hara spots a black cat at the nightclub, which hisses and leaves.

The group sails to the island the next day, where they are greeted by Luna and a shaman. They are warned to leave as the island is the reported home to zombies of dead natives. But Luna, who might be a ghost, takes a liking to Larry.

== Cast ==
- Laura Gemser as Luna
- George Eastman as Larry O'Hara
- Dirce Funari as Fiona
- Mark Shannon as John Wilson
- Lucía Ramírez as Liz (uncredited)

== Production ==
Erotic Nights of the Living Dead was filmed at the same time as Porno Holocaust in Santo Domingo with the same cast. Both films involve a group of foreigners who find an island, have sex, and then are killed off one by one.

Director Joe D'Amato later said in an interview published in 1992 that the film was originally designed to cash-in on the zombie film trend and when "we decided to add sex and comedy and went too far in both directions. The whole thing ended up like a farce. The zombie indulging in anal intercourse with the lead actress was too ridiculous for words."

== Release ==
=== Theatrical ===
Erotic Nights of the Living Dead was released in 1980 and was not a large success. As D'Amato remarked in an interview, "Le notti erotiche dei morti viventi was a total fiasco. I had endeavored to mingle my two favorite genres, tending more toward the erotic side in this case, but the film was rejected by the public."

=== Home media ===
On 15 June 2018, the film was released on blu-ray by Code Red DVD in its English dubbed hardcore version.

== Reception ==
In 2005, Louis Paul wrote in a chapter devoted to D'Amato that the film "is pure cinema horror trash, but watchable nonetheless. In the history of the Italian horror film there is no other feature film quite like it."

In 2011, Danny Shipka, author of Perverse Titillation: The Exploitation Cinema of Italy, Spain and France, 1960-1980 gave both Porno Holocaust and Erotic Nights of the Living Dead a negative review, criticising the acting, gore effects and sex scenes, and stated that the merging of "hard-core sex and extreme violence is disturbing" The book Zombie Movies: The Ultimate Guide describes the film as "one of the worst if not the worst Italian zombie movie ever made".
