= Ole Søltoft =

Danish actor (1941–1999)

- Born: January 8, 1941; Kolding, Denmark
- Died: May 9, 1999 (aged 58); Kolding, Denmark
- Occupation: Actor
- Spouse: Ulla Asbjørn Andersen

Ole Søltoft (8 January 1941 – 9 May 1999 in Kolding) was a Danish actor who became an icon of the 1970s wave of Danish erotic feature film comedies. For over a decade he starred or co-starred in nearly all notable films in this genre and became hopelessly typecast, usually playing naive, likeable guys with a healthy sexual appetite. He is especially remembered for the Bedside-films and Zodiac-films, though his big breakthrough was as the romantic lead in Annelise Meineche's Sytten (1965).

== Biography ==
Ole Søltoft was born in Kolding and was the son of engineer Svend Aage Sølvtoft and his wife Maria Rita Viola Sølvtoft (née Kristensen). He grew up in Holeby on the island of Lolland and was a substitute teacher after high school. Then he studied one year at the Tandlægehøjskolen.

Through student revues he was admitted to Private Theatres' Pupil School from 1960 to 1962. He debuted at the People's Theatre in 1962 and was already in the apprenticeship role of the mischievous Nicholas in Nøddebo Præstegård.

Søltoft began his film career with the role of Jacob in 1962's Den kære familie, a film about turn of the century Copenhagen. After a few small roles, the breakthrough of Erik Soya's Sytten in 1965 began a wave of erotic films for Søltoft. In Den røde rubin, Søltoft starred as Ask Burlefot, who goes from shy schoolboy to sexually experienced. He went on to star in numerous films of the 1970s, mainly sex comedies and erotic comedies – roles that have always put him pigeonholed by the audience and the press. He usually played a confused little man who had to fight his way through a sea of sexy girls. He starred in the successful, decade-long series of Bedside-films, including Mazurka på sengekanten (Mazurka on the bedside), Tandlæge på sengekanten (Dentist on the bedside) and Rektor på sengekanten (Rector on the bedside). Søltoft also played in several of Zodiac-films, where Zodiac signs were part of the film's title; for example, I Løvens tegn (In Leo), I Jomfruens tegn (In Virgo), and I Tyrens tegn (In Taurus). He retired from film in 1978.

== Personal life ==
Ole Søltoft was married to actress Ulla Asbjørn Andersen. He is buried at Rødovre cemetery.

== Films ==
- Gøngehøvdingen (1961)
- Den kære familie (1962)
- Halløj i himmelsengen (1965)
- Sytten (1965)
- Een pige og 39 sømænd (1965)
- Tre små piger (1966)
- Min søsters børn (1966)
- Soyas tagsten (1966)
- Far laver sovsen (1967)
- Sangen om den røde rubin (1970)
- Mazurka på sengekanten (1970) – Released in the UK as Bedroom Mazurka
- Hurra for de blå husarer (1970)
- Tandlæge på sengekanten (1971) – Released in the UK as Danish Dentist on the Job
- Dagmars Heta Trosor (1971) – Released in the UK as Dagmar's Hot Pants
- Rektor på sengekanten (1972) – Released in the UK as Danish Bed and Board
- Dan Ma jiao wa (1973)
- I Jomfruens tegn (1973)
- Romantik på sengekanten (1973)
- Sexy Girls of Denmark (1973)
- Revykøbing kalder (1973)
- Den Meget talende barber (1974)
- Champagnegalopp (1975) – Released in the UK as What the Swedish Butler Saw
- Der må være en sengekant (1975)
- I Tvillingernes tegn (1975)
- Hopla på sengekanten (1976)
- I Løvens tegn (1976)
- Sømænd på sengekanten (1976)
- Affæren i Mølleby (1976)
- Agent 69 Jensen i Skorpionens tegn (1977) – Released in the UK as Danish Blue
- Piger til søs (1977)
- Agent 69 Jensen i Skyttens tegn (1978) – Released in the UK as More Danish Blue
