= Porno Holocaust =

- Film poster
- Directed by: Joe D'Amato
- Written by: Tito Carpi
- Starring: Annj Goren; Dirce Funari; Mark Shannon; George Eastman
- Cinematography: Joe D'Amato
- Edited by: Ornella Micheli
- Music by: Nico Fidenco
- Production company: Kristal Film
- Distributed by: Variety Distribution
- Release date: February 9, 1981 (Italy)
- Running time: 113 minutes
- Country: Italy
- Language: Italian

Porno Holocaust is a 1981 Italian sexploitation horror film directed and lensed by Joe D'Amato and written by Tito Carpi under the pseudonym "Tom Salina". The assistant director was Donatella Donati. Shot in and around Santo Domingo, it was one of the first cinematically released Italian films containing hardcore pornography. The title has been seen as a "riff" on Cannibal Holocaust.

== Plot ==
A group of scientists are taken to a secluded island where nuclear weapons testing occurred in 1958, in order to investigate sightings of mutated animals, and allegations of a monster. On the island, overgrown crabs are discovered, and the researchers and their ship's crew are stalked and spied on by an unseen being. After having sex with his wife, professor Keller goes for a swim, and is drowned by the monster, which then rapes and kills Keller's wife.

At the main camp, the ship's two crew members, Pierre and Jacques, go off to collect fruit, and are followed by the beast. Pierre is bludgeoned with a rock, while Jacques is beaten to death with a log. Hearing the two men being attacked, the rest of the expedition goes to investigate. The monster captures Annie and takes her to its cave lair, where Annie finds a journal. The book reveals the creature was once Antoine Domoduro, one of the island's original inhabitants. He became stranded there with his wife and daughter during atomic bomb tests, which killed his family and mutated him.

The next day, the others discover the bodies of their companions, and that the boat is gone. Captain Herbier goes in search of Annie, and finds Benoît, a reporter who had followed the researchers to the island. Dying due to severe injuries, Benoît tells Herbier that he was attacked by an "ape man" that is holding Annie captive in a nearby cave. Back at the camp, Antoine strangles Professor Lemoine, and kills then rapes Countess de Saint-Jacques, leaving Herbier to try to rescue Annie on his own.

Herbier finds the cave and frees Annie, but while fleeing the two are confronted by Antoine, whom Hardy shoots in the chest with a speargun. Antoine rips the spear out and tries to attack Herbier with it, but is distracted when Annie calls out his name. Antoine falls to the ground dead, and Herbier and Annie leave the island on Benoit's boat, on which the two celebrate their escape by having sex.

== Cast ==
- George Eastman (Luigi Montefiori) as Professor Lemoine
- Dirce Funari (Patrizia Funari) as Doctor Simone Keller
- Annj Goren (Anna Maria Napolitano) as Doctor Dauphine de Saint-Jacques
- Mark Shannon (Manlio Cersosimo) as Captain Herbier

The following cast members are uncredited in the film:

- Lucia Ramirez as Annie Vermont
- George Du Bren as Professor Keller
- Ennio Michettoni as Benoît, the journalist

== Production ==
After filming Papaya, Love Goddess of the Cannibals and Tough to Kill in Santo Domingo between May and September 1978, director Joe D'Amato began filming Porno Holocaust, Paradiso blu, Sesso nero, Orgasmo nero, Hard sensation, and Erotic Nights of the Living Dead at the same location in July 1979. The films were then released in Italian cinemas from May 1980 to January 1981. They shared numerous actors, locations and story elements, and reused footage and outtakes from the other films.

In this so-called Caribbean series, Porno Holocaust was one of three films produced by Franco Gaudenzi's company Kristal Film, the others being Porno esotic love and Hard sensation. It was also the film with the highest amount of explicit sex (approximately 33% of its total duration). Shooting started on 29 October 1979 under the working title Tilt. Among the cast was production designer Ennio Michettoni, who appeared uncredited in the role of the journalist Benoît.

According to Marco Giusti, D'Amato told Peter Blumenstock that Bruno Mattei had directed a large part of the film without taking credit; Giusti therefore listed Mattei as uncredited co-director. This information was later considered "completely unfounded" by Andrea Napoli; he stated that Mattei himself had denied involvement in the film.

The monster's phallus is fake, which was discovered by Sergio Grmek Germani and confirmed by D'Amato.

== Release ==
Porno Holocaust premiered in Italy on 9 February 1981 at the Bellini in Caltanissetta, and subsequently started on 17 February in Turin, in Milan on 12 March (under its alternative title Delizie erotiche in Porno holocaust), and on 18 December 1981 in Rome. In its first five years in Italian cinemas, the film made 357.173.233 lire, the equivalent of 184.465 euros.

The film was also distributed elsewhere in Europe, such as France in January 1982 under the title Blue holocaust and in Spain as Holocausto porno in March 1984, where the film had 34,292 spectators which returned an equivalent of €82,278.

The film had an alternative Italian title of Delizie erotiche in Porno holocaust which has led the film to be sometimes confused with Bruno Gaburro's film Delizie erotiche. A German softcore version titled Insel der Zombies uses a number of musical tracks taken from Erotic Nights of the Living Dead.

== Reception ==
In 2003, Scott Aaron Stine reviewed the film under the title Erotic Delights, listing Porno Holocaust only as an alternative title. He described the film's monster as "a well-endowed black guy in a Robinson Crusoe get-up", and commented that most of the film followed the conventions of pornographic film: "everything is cued so as to allow one sex scene to be followed by another". Stine observed "awful make-up prosthetics" and "no-budget gore", whose existence he ascribed "to mak[ing] sure the viewer hasn't fallen asleep to the rather uneventful screwing". Stine also noticed that the girl the mutant does not rape, but instead abducts and gifts with flowers, "doesn't seem to be terribly upset over her predicament, despite the bodies piling up around her". He concluded by referring to the film as "dreck".

One year later, Gordiano Lupi in his book on D'Amato stated that the film was "crazy and visionary" and called it the best film of D'Amato's Caribbean period. The film was "exasperatingly slow" and the acting was sub-par, but Lupi saw these weaknesses as elements that even added to the myth of a "home-made cinema of the extreme". He wrote that the scenes of hardcore pornography were "well attended to" and "shot with craftsmanship and pioneering spirit", keeping in mind that these were the first of their kind in Italian film.

In 2005, Ian Jane on DVD Talk gave the film two stars, and wrote, "As a pornographic film, while quite explicit, Porno Holocaust sucks. As a horror film, Porno Holocaust sucks even more. But as a curiosity item, it's interesting and the movie does contain some bizarro moments of unintentional hilarity if you can get past the sex scenes that bombard you every five minutes or so. The explicit content isn't so much arousing as it is... curious, and the tepid smatterings of blood and guts here and there make it even more so." The review concludes by calling Porno Holocaust "a really bad movie".

In his book Perverse Titillation: The Exploitation Cinema of Italy, Spain and France, 1960-1980 published in 2011, assistant professor Danny Shipka of Louisiana State University gave both Porno Holocaust and Erotic Night of the Living Dead negative reviews, criticizing the acting, gore, and sex scenes, and concluding that the merging of "hard-core sex and extreme violence is disturbing".

In 2014, Andrea Napoli listed a number of pornographic scenes that he considered "cult sequences" and criticised the narrative horror-themed parts as being partly drawn out, verbose, and almost completely devoid of suspense. He found that the scenes with the humanoid monster "could not manage to escape being involuntarily ridiculous", including Dirce Funari's oral rape scene.
