= Annie Birgit Garde =

Danish actress (born 1933)

- Born: 3 October 1933 (age 91); Frederikssund, Denmark
- Occupation: Actor
- Years active: 1955–present

Annie Birgit Garde (born 3 October 1933) is a Danish film actress. Garde has appeared in more than 40 films since 1955.

== Selected filmography ==
- Altid ballade (1955)
- Father of Four and the Wolf Cubs (1958)
- Soldaterkammerater rykker ud (1959)
- Charles' Aunt (1959)
- Journey to the Seventh Planet (1962)
- Sytten (1965)
- Bedside Dentist (1971)
- Strømer (1976)
