= List of feature films with gay characters: 2010s =

Symbol for male homosexuality

The following is a list of feature films with fictional and factual gay characters. The films were released theatrically, direct-to-video, or on a streaming platform (OTT network).

Films are in alphabetical order by year of release. Titles beginning with determiners "A", "An", and "The" are alphabetized by the first significant word.

== 2010–2014 ==
List
Year	Title	Character(s)	Actor	Notes	Country	Ref(s)
2010	Amphetamine	Daniel	Thomas Price	Daniel is a wealthy Chinese-Australian investment banker working in Hong Kong meets and befriends Kafka, a young swimming instructor from a poor local family, who has strong religious beliefs. Kafka was sexually assaulted as a teenager by a male gang after successfully defending a young woman from being raped, and as a result, he has become impotent and a habitual user of recreational drugs. Although initially uncomfortable with Daniel's obvious sexual attraction to him, he soon sees Daniel as offering him new hope in life, and he falls deeply in love with him. But Kafka's life begins to fall apart again when his mother dies suddenly, and he attempts to end his life.	Hong Kong	
2010	Beginners	Hal	Christopher Plummer	Shortly after his wife's death, Hal comes out to his son and begins exploring life as an openly gay man. He begins a romantic relationship with Andy.	United States	
2010	Beginners	Andy	Goran Višnjić	Shortly after his wife's death, Hal comes out to his son and begins exploring life as an openly gay man. He begins a romantic relationship with Andy.	United States	
2010	Burlesque	Sean	Stanley Tucci	A wisecracking man who works in a strip club.	United States	
2010	Death at a Funeral	Frank Lovett	Peter Dinklage	A dwarf in love with the late father of the protagonist.	United States, United Kingdom	
2010	Dirty Girl	Clarke Walters	Jeremy Dozier	Walters is a chubby, shy 15-year-old classmate of Edmondston.	United States	
2010	Easy A	Brandon	Dan Byrd	Olive's friend Brandon is bullied by other students for being gay.	United States	
2010	Every Day	Jonah Freed	Ezra Miller	As a father, Ned is worried about his son coming out.	United States	
2010	For Colored Girls	Carl Bradmore	Omari Hardwick	Carl is a rich closeted conducting a doomed marriage with Jo.	United States	
2010	Howl	Allen Ginsberg	James Franco	Ginsberg is a central figure of the Beat Generation. Fellow poet Orlovsky is Ginsberg's life partner for over forty years.	United States	
2010	Howl	Peter Orlovsky	Aaron Tveit	Ginsberg is a central figure of the Beat Generation. Fellow poet Orlovsky is Ginsberg's life partner for over forty years.	United States	
2010	The Last Exorcism	Logan	Logan Craig Reid	Logan explains to the crew about his sexuality and only had a brief conversation with Nell during a party at Manley's house six months prio	United States	
2010	Little White Lies	Vincent	Benoît Magimel	Osteopath Vincent confesses his attraction to restaurateur Max.	France	
2010	Scott Pilgrim vs. the World	Scott aka "Other Scott"	Ben Lewis	Ben is Wallace's best friend. Wallace is Scott's roommate, who has a boyfriend named Scott. He also hooked up with Stacey's boyfriend Jimmy.	United Kingdom, United States, Japan	
2010	Scott Pilgrim vs. the World	Stephen Stills	Mark Webber	Ben is Wallace's best friend. Wallace is Scott's roommate, who has a boyfriend named Scott. He also hooked up with Stacey's boyfriend Jimmy.	United Kingdom, United States, Japan	
2010	Scott Pilgrim vs. the World	Wallace Wells	Kieran Culkin	Ben is Wallace's best friend. Wallace is Scott's roommate, who has a boyfriend named Scott. He also hooked up with Stacey's boyfriend Jimmy.	United Kingdom, United States, Japan	
2010	Valentine's Day	Sean Jackson	Eric Dane	Sean comes out on national television, and Holden, Sean's lover, goes back to him	United States	
2010	Valentine's Day	Holden Wilson	Bradley Cooper	Sean comes out on national television, and Holden, Sean's lover, goes back to him	United States	
2011	Bernie	Bernie Tiede	Jack Black	Bernie is a closeted, yet flamboyant mortician who befriends a mean elderly widow.	United States	
2011	The Best Exotic Marigold Hotel	Graham Dashwood	Tom Wilkinson	Dashwood is a High Court judge who lived in Jaipur as a child, abruptly retires to return there.	United Kingdom	
2011	The Broken Tower	Hart Crane	James Franco	Biopic about the American poet.	United States	
2011	The Broken Tower	Emile Opffer	Michael Shannon	Biopic about the American poet.	United States	
2011	The Guard	Garda Aidan McBride	Rory Keenan	McBride is Sergeant Boyle's new subordinate.	Ireland, United Kingdom	
2011	In the Family	Joey Williams	Patrick Wang	After Joey's partner, Cody, is killed in a car accident, Joey fights to maintain custody of their 6-year-old son, Chip.	United States	
2011	In the Family	Cody Hines	Trevor St. John	After Joey's partner, Cody, is killed in a car accident, Joey fights to maintain custody of their 6-year-old son, Chip.	United States	
2011	J. Edgar	J. Edgar Hoover	Leonardo DiCaprio	Focusing on Hoover's life from the 1919 Palmer Raids onward.	United States	
2011	Just Go With It	Ian Maxtone-Jones	Dave Matthews	Katherine's frenemy from college, Devlin, confesses that she is divorcing Ian because of his homosexuality.	United States	
2011	The Ledge	Chris	Christopher Gorham	Chris is Gavin's roommate.	United States	
2011	Love Actually... Sucks!	Bridesman	Ryo van Kooten	Inspired by real-life events, the film tells a series of interconnected stories, several with LGBT relationships. The opening wedding banquet reveals a sex affair between the bridegroom and a bridesman. Other stories include a married painter who falls in love with his young male life model, a dance school teacher who becomes involved with his senior student, and a role-playing lesbian couple.	Hong Kong	
2011	Love Actually... Sucks!	Model	Tang Wei	Inspired by real-life events, the film tells a series of interconnected stories, several with LGBT relationships. The opening wedding banquet reveals a sex affair between the bridegroom and a bridesman. Other stories include a married painter who falls in love with his young male life model, a dance school teacher who becomes involved with his senior student, and a role-playing lesbian couple.	Hong Kong	
2011	Love Actually... Sucks!	Painter	John Tai	Inspired by real-life events, the film tells a series of interconnected stories, several with LGBT relationships. The opening wedding banquet reveals a sex affair between the bridegroom and a bridesman. Other stories include a married painter who falls in love with his young male life model, a dance school teacher who becomes involved with his senior student, and a role-playing lesbian couple.	Hong Kong	
2011	North Sea Texas	Pim	Jelle Florizoone	Pim and his mother, Yvette, live in the Belgian countryside with their Miniature Pinscher.	Belgium	
2011	Romeos	Lukas	Rick Okon	Trans man Lukas falls in love with cis man Fabio	Germany	
2011	Romeos	Fabio	Maximilian Befort	Trans man Lukas falls in love with cis man Fabio	Germany	
2011	Tinker Tailor Soldier Spy	Peter Guillam	Benedict Cumberbatch	Peter is a spy.	United Kingdom	
2011	The Unkabogable Praybeyt Benjamin	Private Benjamin Santos VIII	Vice Ganda	Santos joins the military to save his grandfather.	Philippines	
2011	Weekend	Russell	Tom Cullen	Russell and Glen are two men who meet and begin a sexual relationship the weekend before one of them plans to leave the country.	United Kingdom	
2011	Weekend	Glen	Chris New	Russell and Glen are two men who meet and begin a sexual relationship the weekend before one of them plans to leave the country.	United Kingdom	
2012	Celeste and Jesse Forever	Scott	Elijah Wood	Celeste runs her own media company with a business partner, Scott.	United States	
2012	Cloud Atlas	Rufus Sixsmith	James D'Arcy	Rufus is Robert's lover.	Germany, United States	
2012	For a Good Time, Call...	Jesse	Justin Long	Jesse is Lauren's friend.	United States	
2012	Four	Joe	Wendell Pierce	Joe, a married middle-aged black man, goes out on a date with a young man with his daughter and her date.	United States	
2012	Ginger & Rosa	Mark	Timothy Spall	Both Marks are port of a group of older activists in Anti-nuclear movement.	United Kingdom, Denmark, Canada	
2012	Ginger & Rosa	Mark II	Oliver Platt	Both Marks are port of a group of older activists in Anti-nuclear movement.	United Kingdom, Denmark, Canada	
2012	Hit and Run	Terry Rathbinn	Jess Rowland	Terry is Gil's brother and a police officer.	United States	
2012	On the Road	Tall thin salesman	Steve Buscemi	Sal and Dean travel back to New York with a tall, thin salesman from whom Dean tries to get money in exchange for sex.	France, United Kingdom, Mexico, Brazil, United States, Canada	
2012	The Paperboy	Ward Jansen	Matthew McConaughey	Ward is not resented by his brother Jack for being a homosexual, but for keeping it a secret from him.	United States	
2012	The Perks of Being a Wallflower	Brad	Johnny Simmons	Patrick and Brad, the high school quarterback at Charlie's school, are in a relationship.	United States	
2012	The Perks of Being a Wallflower	Patrick	Ezra Miller	Patrick and Brad, the high school quarterback at Charlie's school, are in a relationship.	United States	
2012	Rock of Ages	Lonny Barnett	Russell Brand	Dupree is the owner of the Bourbon Room and Barnett is his right-hand man.	United States	
2012	Rock of Ages	Dennis Dupree	Alec Baldwin	Dupree is the owner of the Bourbon Room and Barnett is his right-hand man.	United States	
2012	Sassy Pants	Chip Hardy	Haley Joel Osment	Chip is Dale's boyfriend.	United States	
2012	Sassy Pants	Dale Pinto	Diedrich Bader	Chip is Dale's boyfriend.	United States	
2012	Speechless	Luke	Pierre-Matthieu Vital	A mute Frenchman (Luke) is found naked by the banks of a river in Wuhan in mainland China. He is rescued and sent to a local hospital where he is treated by a nurse who cares for him and later discovers the secrets of his past.	Hong Kong, China	
2012	Ted	Guy	Patrick Warburton	Guy is John's co-worker and Jared is his boyfriend.	United States	
2012	Ted	Jared	Ryan Reynolds	Guy is John's co-worker and Jared is his boyfriend.	United States	
2013	After the Dark	Jack	Freddie Stroma	In the third trial, Petra saves Jack, who is gay outside of the simulation, to preserve diversity.	Indonesia, United States	
2013	The Amazing Praybeyt Benjamin	Private Benjamin Santos VIII	Vice Ganda	On a mission in Paris, Praybeyt Benjamin and his platoon defeat a horde of zombies in a parody of Plants vs. Zombies, leading to his promotion to Colonel	Philippines	
2013	Baggage Claim	Sam	Adam Brody	Aam is one of Montana's friends.	United States	
2013	The Bling Ring	Marc Hall	Israel Broussard	Hall is a quiet student arriving as a new student at Indian Hills High School in Agoura Hills, California.	United States, United Kingdom, France, Germany, Japan	
2013	Blue Is the Warmest Colour	Valentin	Sandor Funtek	Valentin is Adèle's close friend.	France, Belgium, Spain	
2013	Free Fall	Kay Engel	Max Riemelt	While on a training course, Borgmann meets fellow police officer Engel, and a romance develops between the two men.	Germany	
2013	G.B.F.	Tanner Daniels	Michael J. Willett	Daniels is a comic book geek who is the first "out of the closet gay" at his school. Van Camp is Tanner's best friend who is very feminine and sassy.	United States	
2013	G.B.F.	Brent Van Camp	Paul Iacono	Daniels is a comic book geek who is the first "out of the closet gay" at his school. Van Camp is Tanner's best friend who is very feminine and sassy.	United States	
2013	Geography Club	Russell Middlebrook	Cameron Deane Stewart	Following a group of high school students who feel like outsiders, some because of their sexual orientations. Middlebrook then finds himself helping his friend Min to form an after-school club for the students, so that they can hang out together for support.	United States	
2013	Grown Ups 2	Kyle	Oliver Hudson	Kyle is a yoga teacher at Squats Fitness.	United States	
2013	Grown Ups 2	Nick	Nick Swardson	Kyle is a yoga teacher at Squats Fitness.	United States	
2013	Kick-Ass 2	Insect-Man	Robert Emms	Insect-Man is an insect-themed superhero and a member of the Justice Forever team. He was bullied, inspiring him to become a superhero to stand up for the defenseless. He does not wear a mask because hiding his identity would feel like going back into the closet.	United Kingdom, United States	
2013	Kill Your Darlings	Lucien Carr	Dane DeHaan	Carr is an unruly character who holds strong anti-establishment beliefs who runs into Allen Ginsberg in 1944 Columbia University.	United Kingdom	
2013	The Mortal Instruments: City of Bones	Alec Lightwood	Kevin Zegers	Magnus is a warlock.	Canada, Germany, United States, United Kingdom	
2013	Philomena	Michael	Sean Mahon	Hess is a lawyer and senior official in the Reagan and George H. W. Bush administrations.	France, United Kingdom, United States	
2013	Pit Stop	Ernesto	Marcus DeAnda	Retelling the story of two men in a small town in Texas.	United States	
2013	Pit Stop	Gabe	Bill Heck	Retelling the story of two men in a small town in Texas.	United States	
2013	SDU: Sex Duties Unit	Hai Mai	Derek Tsang	The youthful Mai is teased often by his teammates of the SDU.	Hong Kong	
2013	Starred Up	Neville Love	Ben Mendelsohn	Neville falls in love with his male inmate.	United Kingdom	
2013	Tom at the Farm	Tom Podowski	Xavier Dolan	Tom travels to an isolated farm for his lover's funeral where he's quickly drawn into a twisted, sexually charged game by his lover's aggressive brother, Francis.	Canada	
2013	Voyage	Ryo	Ryo van Kooten	Filmed across Asia and Europe, the story follows the journey of Ryo, a young Hong Kong psychiatrist, who is accompanied by his male lover as he visits former patients in neighbouring countries of South East Asia. Several of his clients are themselves in LGBT relationships. (The film features frequent full-frontal male nudity.)	Hong Kong	
2013	Voyage	Jip	Jason Poon	Filmed across Asia and Europe, the story follows the journey of Ryo, a young Hong Kong psychiatrist, who is accompanied by his male lover as he visits former patients in neighbouring countries of South East Asia. Several of his clients are themselves in LGBT relationships. (The film features frequent full-frontal male nudity.)	Hong Kong	
2014	Blackbird	Randy Rousseau	Julian Walker	In a small baptist community in the south of Mississippi, Rousseau is a 17-year-old high school senior and talented singer juggles with his sexuality and religion while also dealing with the disappearance of his younger sister as it tore his family apart.	United States	
2014	Boulevard	Nolan Mack	Robin Williams	Mack has worked at the same bank for almost 26 years in a life of monotony. He and his wife, Joy, have embraced their marriage as a convenient and comfortable distraction from facing reality	United States	
2014	The Circle	Ernst Ostertag	Matthias Hungerbühler	Docudrama about Ernst Ostertag and Röbi Rapp, the first gay men to register a domestic partnership in Switzerland.	Switzerland	
2014	The Circle	Röbi Rapp	Sven Schelker	Docudrama about Ernst Ostertag and Röbi Rapp, the first gay men to register a domestic partnership in Switzerland.	Switzerland	
2014	Coming In	Robert	Ken Duken	Robert is the boyfriend of protagonist Tom Herzner.	Germany	
2014	Date and Switch	Matty	Hunter Cope	Best friends Matty and Michael make a pact to have a sexual relationship with an older woman after breaking up with their high-school girlfriends, while Matty also comes out as gay to his ex-girlfriend Em.	United States	
2014	Dear White People	Lionel Higgins	Tyler James Williams	Higgins, a black student, gets a chance to find his place at Winchester by being recruited by the school's most prestigious student newspaper to write a piece on Sam and the black experience at Winchester.	United States	
2014	Futuro Beach	Donato	Wagner Moura	Donato leaves for Berlin in search of his German lover, Konrad, whom he had met ten years earlier at Praia do Futuro and saved from drowning.	Brazil, Germany	
2014	Futuro Beach	Konrad	Clemens Schick	Donato leaves for Berlin in search of his German lover, Konrad, whom he had met ten years earlier at Praia do Futuro and saved from drowning.	Brazil, Germany	
2014	The Imitation Game	Alan Turing	Benedict Cumberbatch (adult); Alex Lawther (young)	Biopic about Turing, who deciphered the code of the Enigma machine, a device used by Nazi Germany during World War II. After the end of the war, he is convicted of indecency because of his homosexuality, undergoes chemical castration, and later commits suicide. The young Turing was close to his classmate Christopher Morcom, and they passed written encoded notes to each other. Their friendship ends when Christopher dies from bovine tuberculosis. Turing names the Enigma-breaking machine "Christopher" after him.	United States	
2014	The Imitation Game	Christopher Morcom	Jack Bannon		United States	
2014	Just Before I Go	Zeke Morgan	Kyle Gallner	Ted's nephew, Zeke, is secretly gay and is involved with a schoolmate, Romeo (Evan Ross).	United States	
2014	Just Before I Go	Romeo Semple	Evan Ross	Ted's nephew, Zeke, is secretly gay and is involved with a schoolmate, Romeo (Evan Ross).	United States	
2014	Lilting	Kai	Andrew Leung	Retelling the story of a mother's attempt at understanding who her son was after his untimely death. Her world is suddenly disrupted by the presence of his lover.	United Kingdom	
2014	Lilting	Richard	Ben Whishaw	Retelling the story of a mother's attempt at understanding who her son was after his untimely death. Her world is suddenly disrupted by the presence of his lover.	United Kingdom	
2014	Love Is Strange	George Garea	Alfred Molina	Ben and George, a couple from Manhattan, get married after 39 years together.	United States, France	
2014	Love Is Strange	Ben Hull	John Lithgow	Ben and George, a couple from Manhattan, get married after 39 years together.	United States, France	
2014	Obvious Child	Joey	Gabe Liedman	Joey is Donna and Nellie's friend, who is also a comedian.	United States	
2014	Pride	Mark Ashton	Ben Schnetzer	Based on a true story, a group of lesbian and gay activists who raised money to help families affected by the British miners' strike in 1984, at the outset of what would become the Lesbians and Gays Support the Miners campaign.	United Kingdom	
2014	Pride	Mike Jackson	Joe Gilgun	Based on a true story, a group of lesbian and gay activists who raised money to help families affected by the British miners' strike in 1984, at the outset of what would become the Lesbians and Gays Support the Miners campaign.	United Kingdom	
2014	Pride	Jonathan Blake	Dominic West	Based on a true story, a group of lesbian and gay activists who raised money to help families affected by the British miners' strike in 1984, at the outset of what would become the Lesbians and Gays Support the Miners campaign.	United Kingdom	
2014	Pride	Gethin Roberts	Andrew Scott	Based on a true story, a group of lesbian and gay activists who raised money to help families affected by the British miners' strike in 1984, at the outset of what would become the Lesbians and Gays Support the Miners campaign.	United Kingdom	
2014	Pride	Jeff Cole	Freddie Fox	Based on a true story, a group of lesbian and gay activists who raised money to help families affected by the British miners' strike in 1984, at the outset of what would become the Lesbians and Gays Support the Miners campaign.	United Kingdom	
2014	Pride	Reggie	Chris Overton	Based on a true story, a group of lesbian and gay activists who raised money to help families affected by the British miners' strike in 1984, at the outset of what would become the Lesbians and Gays Support the Miners campaign.	United Kingdom	
2014	Pride	Ray	Joshua Hill	Based on a true story, a group of lesbian and gay activists who raised money to help families affected by the British miners' strike in 1984, at the outset of what would become the Lesbians and Gays Support the Miners campaign.	United Kingdom	
2014	Pride	Joe "Bromley" Cooper	George Mackay	Based on a true story, a group of lesbian and gay activists who raised money to help families affected by the British miners' strike in 1984, at the outset of what would become the Lesbians and Gays Support the Miners campaign.	United Kingdom	
2014	Pride	Cliff Barry	Bill Nighy	Based on a true story, a group of lesbian and gay activists who raised money to help families affected by the British miners' strike in 1984, at the outset of what would become the Lesbians and Gays Support the Miners campaign.	United Kingdom	
2014	Pride	Tim	Russel Tovey	Based on a true story, a group of lesbian and gay activists who raised money to help families affected by the British miners' strike in 1984, at the outset of what would become the Lesbians and Gays Support the Miners campaign.	United Kingdom	
2014	The Skeleton Twins	Milo Dean	Bill Hader	Milo reconnects with his high school English teacher Rich, with whom he had a sexual relationship when he was 15.	United States	
2014	Space Station 76	Captain Glenn Terry	Patrick Wilson	Captain Terry, whose struggle with his homosexuality caused his breakup with Daniel, and then his alcoholism.	United States	
2014	Space Station 76	Daniel	Matthew Morrison	Captain Terry, whose struggle with his homosexuality caused his breakup with Daniel, and then his alcoholism.	United States	
2014	The Way He Looks	Leonardo	Ghilherme Lobo	Leonardo is a blind high school student who falls in love with the new kid, Gabriel. Gabriel falls in love with Leo. He was once aroused when he saw Leo naked in the showers.	Brazil	
2014	The Way He Looks	Gabriel	Fabio Audi	Leonardo is a blind high school student who falls in love with the new kid, Gabriel. Gabriel falls in love with Leo. He was once aroused when he saw Leo naked in the showers.	Brazil	
2014	White Bird in a Blizzard	Mickey	Mark Indelicato	Mickey is one of Kat's best pals from high school.	France, United States	

== 2015–2019 ==
List
Year	Title	Character(s)	Actor	Notes	Country	Ref(s)
2015	4th Man Out	Adam	Evan Todd	Adam struggles to come out as gay to his three best friends.	United States	
2015	American Ultra	Petey Douglas	Tony Hale	Douglas is Lasseter's former assistant.	United States	
2015	Burnt	Tony Balerdi	Daniel Brühl	Tony is a restaurant owner who's in love with Adam.	United States	
2015	The Danish Girl	Henrik Sandahl	Ben Whishaw	Gerbada introduces Einar, who dressed as Lili somewhat dowdy companion as Einar's cousin, at a party. This strategy is so successful that Lili stirs the amorous interest of a man named Henrik.	United Kingdom, United States	
2015	Demolition	Chris Moreno	Judah Lewis	Chris is the son of Karen, a woman Davis becomes friends with.	United States	
2015	Entourage	Lloyd Lee	Rex Lee	Lloyd marries Greg Louganis. His former boss, Ari, gives him away at the wedding.	United States	
2015	Familienfest	Frederik	Barnaby Metschurat	Frederik is in a civil union with Vincent and they plan to adopt and raise a child together. This conflicts with the conservative views of Frederik's father.	Germany	
2015	Familienfest	Vincent	Daniel Krauss	Frederik is in a civil union with Vincent and they plan to adopt and raise a child together. This conflicts with the conservative views of Frederik's father.	Germany	
2015	Get Hard	Chris	T. J. Jagodowski	Darnell befriends a man named Chris, even after Chris aggressively flirts with him.	United States	
2015	The Heroes of Evil	Aritz	Jorge Clemente	Outcast teenagers Esteban, Sarita and Aritz share a common context of humiliation by their classmates meet, develop a strong friendship and plot to exert revenge.	Spain	
2015	Holding the Man	John Caleo	Craig Stott	Retelling of Conigrave's 15-year love affair with John Caleo, which started when they met in the mid-1970s at Xavier College, an all-boys Jesuit Catholic school in Melbourne, and follows their relationship through the 1990s when they both developed AIDS.	Australia	
2015	Holding the Man	Timothy Conigrave	Ryan Corr	Retelling of Conigrave's 15-year love affair with John Caleo, which started when they met in the mid-1970s at Xavier College, an all-boys Jesuit Catholic school in Melbourne, and follows their relationship through the 1990s when they both developed AIDS.	Australia	
2015	Holy Mess	Oscar	Anton Lundqvist	Centering around Simon and Oscar, a couple that is expecting a child along with their close friend Cissi (Rakel Wärmländer).	Sweden	
2015	Holy Mess	Simon	Anastasios Soulis	Centering around Simon and Oscar, a couple that is expecting a child along with their close friend Cissi (Rakel Wärmländer).	Sweden	
2015	The Invitation	Tommy	Mike Doyle	Tommy and Miguel are guests at a party.	United States	
2015	The Invitation	Miguel	Jordi Vilasuso	Tommy and Miguel are guests at a party.	United States	
2015	James White	Nick	Scott Mescudi	Nick is White's friend who works at a resort in Mexico.	United States	
2015	Legend	Ronnie Kray	Tom Hardy	Dealing with the Kray twins' career and the relationship that bound them together, and follows their gruesome career to life imprisonment in 1969.	United Kingdom, United States	
2015	Legend	Teddy Smith	Taron Egerton	Dealing with the Kray twins' career and the relationship that bound them together, and follows their gruesome career to life imprisonment in 1969.	United Kingdom, United States	
2015	Stonewall	Danny Winters	Jeremy Irvine	Shortly before fleeing the conservative countryside in the late 1960s and moving to New York City, Winters, a boy from Indiana, is discovered by friends while making love with his boyfriend.	United States	
2015	Take Me to the River	Ryder	Logan Miller	Ryder is asked by his parents to keep his sexual orientation a secret from their conservative relatives.	United States	
2015	Those People	Charlie	Jonathan Gordon	Charlie has always been in love with his best friend Sebastian. Both of them are too afraid to admit their love for each other. But after some life changing events happen in their lives, they try to figure out what their relationship really is.	United States	
2015	Those People	Sebastian	Jason Ralph	Charlie has always been in love with his best friend Sebastian. Both of them are too afraid to admit their love for each other. But after some life changing events happen in their lives, they try to figure out what their relationship really is.	United States	
2015	Utopians	Antonio Ming	Jackie Chow	Ming is the professor of Hins Gao, and later begins a romantic relationship with him.	Hong Kong	
2015	Wild Horses	Ben Briggs	James Franco	Ben is kicked out of the house by his father for his homosexuality.	United States	
2016	Absolutely Fabulous: The Movie	Himself	Graham Norton		United Kingdom, United States	
2016	As You Are	Jack	Owen Campbell	Jack is clearly in love with Mark. They later reunite in private, where Mark implies his feelings for Jack, and they kiss passionately.	United States	
2016	As You Are	Mark	Charlie Heaton	Jack is clearly in love with Mark. They later reunite in private, where Mark implies his feelings for Jack, and they kiss passionately.	United States	
2016	Being 17	Damien Delille	Kacey Mottet Klein	The movie follows the romantic and sexual awakening of Damien and Thomas as their initial animosity, expressed in violence, morphs into love.	France	
2016	Being 17	Thomas Chardoul	Corentin Fila	The movie follows the romantic and sexual awakening of Damien and Thomas as their initial animosity, expressed in violence, morphs into love.	France	
2016	Cell	Thomas "Tom" McCourt	Samuel L. Jackson	McCourt is a train conductor.	United States	
2016	Center of My World	Phil	Louis Hofmann	When school begins, the mysterious Nicholas enters the class. Phil feels drawn to him and they soon engage in a passionate love affair, even though it turns Phil's feelings upside down because he does not know what Nicholas thinks of him.	Germany	
2016	Center of My World	Nicholas	Jannik Schümann	When school begins, the mysterious Nicholas enters the class. Phil feels drawn to him and they soon engage in a passionate love affair, even though it turns Phil's feelings upside down because he does not know what Nicholas thinks of him.	Germany	
2016	Curmudgeons	Jackie	Danny DeVito	Surrounding the relationship between two senior citizens, Jackie and Pajovic.	United States	
2016	Curmudgeons	Ralph Pajovic	David Margulies	Surrounding the relationship between two senior citizens, Jackie and Pajovic.	United States	
2016	Dirty Grandpa	Bradley	Jeffrey Bowyer-Chapman	Bradley is a friend of Jason's old photography classmate Shadia.	United States	
2016	Goodbye Berlin	Andrej "Tschick" Tschichatschow	Anand Batbileg	Tschick is a Russia German teenager from Berlin-Marzahn who goes on a roadtrip in a stolen Lada together with his classmate Maik.	Germany	
2016	Handsome Devil	Conor Masters	Nicholas Galitzine	Masters is Ned's new roommate. A new English teacher, Mr Sherry, arrives at the school, who, though stern, is encouraging towards Ned and Conor.	Ireland	
2016	Handsome Devil	Ned Roche	Fionn O'Shea	Masters is Ned's new roommate. A new English teacher, Mr Sherry, arrives at the school, who, though stern, is encouraging towards Ned and Conor.	Ireland	
2016	Handsome Devil	Dan Sherry	Andrew Scott	Masters is Ned's new roommate. A new English teacher, Mr Sherry, arrives at the school, who, though stern, is encouraging towards Ned and Conor.	Ireland	
2016	Heartstone	Kristján	Blær Hinriksson	Focusing on two young friends – Thor and Kristján – on the verge of puberty.	Iceland	
2016	Independence Day: Resurgence	Dr. Brackish Okun	Brent Spiner	Dr. Okun is a Scientist. Dr. Isaacs is his co-worker and lover.	United States	
2016	Independence Day: Resurgence	Dr. Isaacs	John Storey	Dr. Okun is a Scientist. Dr. Isaacs is his co-worker and lover.	United States	
2016	It's Only the End of the World	Louis	Gaspard Ulliel	Louis is a playwright dealing with a terminal illness.	Canada, France	
2016	King Cobra	Brent Corrigan	Garrett Clayton	Focusing on the life and early career of former pornographic film actor Sean Paul Lockhart.	United States	
2016	King Cobra	Harlow Cuadra	Keegan Allen	Focusing on the life and early career of former pornographic film actor Sean Paul Lockhart.	United States	
2016	King Cobra	Joe Kerekes	James Franco	Focusing on the life and early career of former pornographic film actor Sean Paul Lockhart.	United States	
2016	King Cobra	Bryan Kocis	Christian Slater	Focusing on the life and early career of former pornographic film actor Sean Paul Lockhart.	United States	
2016	King Cobra	Mikey	Spencer Lofranco	Focusing on the life and early career of former pornographic film actor Sean Paul Lockhart.	United States	
2016	Miss Stevens	Sam	Anthony Quintal	Sam is an affable student of Stevens'.	United States	
2016	The Mobfathers	Wulf	Gregory Wong	Wulf is a flamboyant ex-cop.	Hong Kong	
2016	Moonlight	Chiron Harris ("Little" / "Black")	Trevante Rhodes	Chiron is a young Black man who grapples with his identity and sexuality while experiencing the everyday struggles of childhood, adolescence, and burgeoning adulthood in Miami.	United States	
2016	Moonlight	Chiron Harris ("Little" / "Black")	Ashton Sanders	Chiron is a young Black man who grapples with his identity and sexuality while experiencing the everyday struggles of childhood, adolescence, and burgeoning adulthood in Miami.	United States	
2016	Moonlight	Chiron Harris ("Little" / "Black")	Alex Hibbert	Chiron is a young Black man who grapples with his identity and sexuality while experiencing the everyday struggles of childhood, adolescence, and burgeoning adulthood in Miami.	United States	
2016	Neighbors 2: Sorority Rising	Pete Regazolli	Dave Franco	Regazolli is one of Sanders' former frat brothers.	United States	
2016	Nocturnal Animals	Carlos Holt	Michael Sheen	Holt is Alessia's husband.	United States	
2016	Other People	David Mulcahey	Jesse Plemons	David has a strained relationship with his father, who still refuses to accept David's sexuality ten years after he came out. He has broken up with his boyfriend Paul.	United States	
2016	Other People	Paul	Zach Woods	David has a strained relationship with his father, who still refuses to accept David's sexuality ten years after he came out. He has broken up with his boyfriend Paul.	United States	
2016	Rage	Yūma Fujita	Satoshi Tsumabuki	Naoto hides out at a gay bathhouse in Tokyo to avoid people. One night, he is approached by Yuma, an open homosexual. Naoto resists Yuma at first, but Yuma holds Naoto down and they have rough sex. Then, Yuma takes Naoto out for dinner and learns that he does not have a place to stay. Yuma offers to let him stay with him until Naoto finds a permanent place and they both become housemates. They slowly fall in love and Yuma even introduces Naoto to his sick mother and his other friends.	Japan	
2016	Rage	Onishi Naoto	Go Ayano	Naoto hides out at a gay bathhouse in Tokyo to avoid people. One night, he is approached by Yuma, an open homosexual. Naoto resists Yuma at first, but Yuma holds Naoto down and they have rough sex. Then, Yuma takes Naoto out for dinner and learns that he does not have a place to stay. Yuma offers to let him stay with him until Naoto finds a permanent place and they both become housemates. They slowly fall in love and Yuma even introduces Naoto to his sick mother and his other friends.	Japan	
2016	Raw	Adrien	Rabah Naït Oufella	On her first night, Justine meets her roommate Adrien, and they are forced to partake in a week-long hazing ritual, welcoming the new students.	France, Belgium	
2016	Spa Night	David	Joe Seo	David, an 18-year-old living in Koreatown, Los Angeles becomes an employee at a spa to help his financially struggling parents. He soon discovers illicit gay sex between the customers, which forces him to consider his own sexuality.	United States	
2016	Tallulah	Andreas	Zachary Quinto	Unknown to Tallulah, Margo is struggling with her own marital problems after her ex-husband Stephen has left her for a man, Andreas, and is pressing Margo to finalize their divorce.	United States	
2016	Tallulah	Stephen Mooney	John Benjamin Hickey	Unknown to Tallulah, Margo is struggling with her own marital problems after her ex-husband Stephen has left her for a man, Andreas, and is pressing Margo to finalize their divorce.	United States	
2016	Two Is a Family	Bernie	Antoine Bertrand	Bernie is a Frenchman who works in the film industry and offers Samuel a stunt job.	France	
2017	Alien: Covenant	Carl Lope	Demián Bichir	Sergeant Lope is the head of the security unit aboard the Covenant and Sergeant Hallett's husband.	United Kingdom, United States	
2017	Alien: Covenant	Hallett	Nathaniel Dean	Sergeant Lope is the head of the security unit aboard the Covenant and Sergeant Hallett's husband.	United Kingdom, United States	
2017	Battle of the Sexes	Ted Tinling	Alan Cumming	Biopic based on champion tennis player Billie Jean King and the 1973 match between her and Bobby Riggs.	United Kingdom, United States	
2017	Beach Rats	Frankie	Harris Dickinson	Frankie is a repressed Brooklyn teen who has sex with older men.	United States	
2017	Beauty and the Beast	LeFou	Josh Gad	LeFou is Gaston's sidekick.	United States	
2017	Bullyparade: The Movie	Jürgen T. Kork	Christian Tramitz	Includes a parody of Star Trek with Jürgen T. Kork (i.e. James T. Kirk), Schrotty (i.e. Scotty) and Mr. Spuck (i.e. Spock) depicted as effeminate.	Germany	
2017	Bullyparade: The Movie	Mr. Spuck	Michael Herbig	Includes a parody of Star Trek with Jürgen T. Kork (i.e. James T. Kirk), Schrotty (i.e. Scotty) and Mr. Spuck (i.e. Spock) depicted as effeminate.	Germany	
2017	Bullyparade: The Movie	Schrotty	Rick Kavanian	Includes a parody of Star Trek with Jürgen T. Kork (i.e. James T. Kirk), Schrotty (i.e. Scotty) and Mr. Spuck (i.e. Spock) depicted as effeminate.	Germany	
2017	God's Own Country	Gheorghe Ionescu	Alec Secareanu	Following a young sheep farmer in Yorkshire whose life is transformed by a Romanian migrant worker.	United Kingdom	
2017	God's Own Country	Johnny Saxby	Josh O'Connor	Following a young sheep farmer in Yorkshire whose life is transformed by a Romanian migrant worker.	United Kingdom	
2017	Lady Bird	Danny O'Neill	Lucas Hedges	After the opening night of the school production of Merrily We Roll Along, Lady Bird sees Danny kissing a boy in a bathroom stall so she breaks up with him.	United States	
2017	My Friend Dahmer	Jeffrey Dahmer	Ross Lynch	Based on the serial killer's early life. Dahmer has shown to be obsessed with a male jogger.	United States	
2017	Nobody's Watching	Nico Lencke	Guillermo Pfening	Nico is an Argentinian who immigrates to the United States aspiring to work as an actor in Hollywood. Pfening is gay in real life.	Argentina, Brazil, Colombia, United States	
2017	Permission	Hale	David Joseph Craig	Hale is Anna's brother and Reece's boyfriend. Reece, Hale's boyfriend and Will's co-worker.	United States	
2017	Permission	Reece	Morgan Spector	Hale is Anna's brother and Reece's boyfriend. Reece, Hale's boyfriend and Will's co-worker.	United States	
2017	Rift	Einar	Sigurdur Thor Oskarsson	Gunnar and Einar get to grips with their fractured relationship amid some spooky situations in a remote cabin in Iceland.	Iceland	
2017	Rift	Gunnar	Bjorn Stefansson	Gunnar and Einar get to grips with their fractured relationship amid some spooky situations in a remote cabin in Iceland.	Iceland	
2017	The Shape of Water	Giles	Richard Jenkins	Elisa's next door neighbor is closeted and fearful, but bravely helps her and the Amphibian Man.	United States	
2017	Speech & Debate	Howie	Austin P. McKenzie	Howie is new to the school, lonely, and tries to form a GSA (gay student alliance) club, but is blocked by the predominantly male conservative school board.	United States	
2017	Thirty Years of Adonis	Yang Ke	Adonis He Fei	Focusing on a young man named Yang Ke, who is a Beijing Opera actor. He decides to pursue acting, and soon becomes a commercial sex worker for men and women.	Hong Kong, Taiwan, China	
2017	Tom of Finland	Touko Laaksonen	Pekka Strang	Laaksonen is an artist who known for his stylized highly masculinized homoerotic art.	Finland, Sweden, Denmark, Germany, United States	
2018	Alex Strangelove	Alex Truelove	Daniel Doheny	At a party, Alex meets Elliot, an openly gay teenager. Alex's continued interactions with Elliot, who has an obvious crush on Alex, lead him to question his sexuality.	United States	
2018	Alex Strangelove	Elliott	Antonio Marziale	At a party, Alex meets Elliot, an openly gay teenager. Alex's continued interactions with Elliot, who has an obvious crush on Alex, lead him to question his sexuality.	United States	
2018	Bird Box	Greg	BD Wong	Greg is a man with a gratuitous allusion to his husband.	United States	
2018	Bohemian Rhapsody	Jim Hutton	Aaron McCusker	Retelling the story of the life of Freddie Mercury, the lead singer of British rock band Queen, from the formation of the band in 1970 up to their 1985 Live Aid performance at the original Wembley Stadium.	United Kingdom, United States	
2018	Bohemian Rhapsody	Paul Prenter	Allen Leech	Retelling the story of the life of Freddie Mercury, the lead singer of British rock band Queen, from the formation of the band in 1970 up to their 1985 Live Aid performance at the original Wembley Stadium.	United Kingdom, United States	
2018	Bohemian Rhapsody	John Reid	Aidan Gillen	Retelling the story of the life of Freddie Mercury, the lead singer of British rock band Queen, from the formation of the band in 1970 up to their 1985 Live Aid performance at the original Wembley Stadium.	United Kingdom, United States	
2018	Boy Erased	Jared Eamons	Lucas Hedges	Jared's childhood in a fundamentalist family in Arkansas that enrolled him in conversion therapy. (Based on Garrard Conley's memoir of the same name.)	United States	
2018	Can You Ever Forgive Me?	Jack Hock	Richard E. Grant	Hock is a foppish drifter who helps Israel forging and selling rare literary letters to bolster her failing writing career.	United States	
2018	Come Sunday	Reggie	Lakeith Stanfield	Reggie is Pearson's accompanist.	United States	
2018	Crazy Rich Asians	Oliver T'sien	Nico Santos	T'sien is Nick's second cousin.	United States, Singapore	
2018	The Death & Life of John F. Donovan	John F. Donovan	Kit Harington	Donovan is a closeted actor.	Canada	
2018	Don't Worry, He Won't Get Far on Foot	Donnie	Jonah Hill	Donnie is John Callahan's Alcoholics Anonymous (AA) sponsor.	United States	
2018	Don't Worry, He Won't Get Far on Foot	Martingale	Ronnie Adrian	Donnie is John Callahan's Alcoholics Anonymous (AA) sponsor.	United States	
2018	Game Over, Man!	Joel aka "Baby Dunk"	Blake Anderson	The film has a comedic subplot about Joel's sexuality.	United States	
2018	Giant Little Ones	Ray Winter	Kyle MacLachlan	Ray leaves his wife for another man, causing his son Franky to refuse to talk to him despite his pleas.	Canada	
2018	Green Book	Don Shirley	Mahershala Ali	Shirley had a homosexual encounter with a white man at a pool.	United States	
2018	The Happy Prince	Lord Alfred "Bosie" Douglas	Colin Morgan	Centering on how Wilde lives out his remaining days in isolation and looks back at his life with great irony and wit.	Germany, Belgium, Italy, United Kingdom	
2018	The Happy Prince	Robbie Ross	Edwin Thomas	Centering on how Wilde lives out his remaining days in isolation and looks back at his life with great irony and wit.	Germany, Belgium, Italy, United Kingdom	
2018	The Happy Prince	Reggie Turner	Colin Firth	Centering on how Wilde lives out his remaining days in isolation and looks back at his life with great irony and wit.	Germany, Belgium, Italy, United Kingdom	
2018	The Happy Prince	Oscar Wilde	Rupert Everett	Centering on how Wilde lives out his remaining days in isolation and looks back at his life with great irony and wit.	Germany, Belgium, Italy, United Kingdom	
2018	Ideal Home	Erasmus Brumble	Steve Coogan	Erasmus, a famous chef, and Paul, the producer of his cooking show, are a couple. They live in a large showplace house in New Mexico.	United States	
2018	Ideal Home	Paul Morgan	Paul Rudd	Erasmus, a famous chef, and Paul, the producer of his cooking show, are a couple. They live in a large showplace house in New Mexico.	United States	
2018	Love, Simon	Simon Spier	Nick Robinson	Based on the novel Simon vs. the Homo Sapiens Agenda.	United States	
2018	Love, Simon	Bram Greenfeld	Keiynan Lonsdale	Based on the novel Simon vs. the Homo Sapiens Agenda.	United States	
2018	Love, Simon	Ethan	Clark Moore	Based on the novel Simon vs. the Homo Sapiens Agenda.	United States	
2018	Mary Queen of Scots	Lord Darnley	Jack Lowden	Mary marries Darnley, only to discover him in bed with her private secretary, David Rizzio.	United Kingdom, United States	
2018	Mary Queen of Scots	David Rizzio	Ismael Cruz Córdova	Mary marries Darnley, only to discover him in bed with her private secretary, David Rizzio.	United Kingdom, United States	
2018	Rainbow's Sunset	Ramoncito Estrella	Eddie Garcia	Ramon who is married to a woman and has children comes out as an elderly man. He has a secret relationship with his long-time friend Fredo who is dying of cancer.	Philippines	
2018	Rainbow's Sunset	Alfredo Veneracion	Tony Mabesa	Ramon who is married to a woman and has children comes out as an elderly man. He has a secret relationship with his long-time friend Fredo who is dying of cancer.	Philippines	
2018	School's out	Pierre Hoffman	Laurent Lafitte	Pierre is a substitute teacher who becomes obsessed with his students' strange behavior. He is in love with his male best friend who just had a child. He also has a crush on one of his male colleagues who appears to be straight.	France	
2018	Set It Up	Duncan	Pete Davidson	Duncan is Charlie's roommate.	United States	
2018	To All the Boys I've Loved Before	Lucas Krapf	Trezzo Mahoro	Lucas is one the crushes that Lara Jean Covey wrote a letter to and then locked away. Kitty, Lara's younger sister, found the letter and sent it to him without Lara's knowledge. After reading it, he told Lara he was gay.	United States	
2018	Truth or Dare	Brad Chang	Hayden Szeto	Brad is closeted.	United States	
2018	You Are the Apple of My Eye	Kazuki Sugimura	Ryosuke Yusa	Sugimura is in a romantic relationship with his Indian business partner.	Japan	
2019	Booksmart	George	Noah Galvin	George and Alan are theater obsessed classmates of Amy and her best friend Molly.	United States	
2019	Booksmart	Alan	Austin Crute	George and Alan are theater obsessed classmates of Amy and her best friend Molly.	United States	
2019	Frankie	Michel	Pascal Greggory	Michel, Frankie's first husband, learned about his homosexuality.	United States, France, Portugal	
2019	The Gentlemen	Fletcher	Hugh Grant	Fletcher is a fast-talking, cockney-accented hustler.	United Kingdom, United States	
2019	The Good Liar	Steven	Russell Tovey	Steven does research on Hans, who raped Lili, confirming his identity in a DNA test using a lock of Hans' hair. It is revealed at the end of the film that Michael is Lili's grandson and Steven's boyfriend.	United Kingdom, United States	
2019	The Good Liar	Michael	Tunji Kasim	Steven does research on Hans, who raped Lili, confirming his identity in a DNA test using a lock of Hans' hair. It is revealed at the end of the film that Michael is Lili's grandson and Steven's boyfriend.	United Kingdom, United States	
2019	Ich war noch niemals in New York	Fred	Michael Ostrowski	Fred is a makeup artist who falls in love with Costa, the ship's magician, while on a cruise to New York.	Germany	
2019	Isn't It Romantic	Donny	Brandon Scott Jones	Donny is Natalie's normally gruff neighbor, who has always come across as a misogynist, becomes a flamboyant homosexual friend offering advice.	United States	
2019	Jojo Rabbit	Captain Klenzendorf	Sam Rockwell	Set in 1945 in Nazi Germany, Klenzendorf and Freddy are in a secret relationship.	United States, New Zealand, Czech Republic	
2019	Jojo Rabbit	Freddy Finkel	Alfie Allen	Set in 1945 in Nazi Germany, Klenzendorf and Freddy are in a secret relationship.	United States, New Zealand, Czech Republic	
2019	Judy	Dan	Andy Nyman	Stan opens up to Judy Garland about the difficulties he and Dan have had maintaining their relationship in the face of legal persecution.	United States	
2019	Judy	Stan	Daniel Cerqueira	Stan opens up to Judy Garland about the difficulties he and Dan have had maintaining their relationship in the face of legal persecution.	United States	
2019	Monsoon	Kit	Henry Golding	Durin his journey, Kit falls for Lewis, an American whose father had fought in the war.	United States	
2019	Monsoon	Lewis	Parker Sawyers	Durin his journey, Kit falls for Lewis, an American whose father had fought in the war.	United States	
2019	Nevrland	Jacob	Simon Frühwirth	17-year-old Jacob and 26-year-old Kristjan begin an intimate relationship after meeting in a video chat.	Austria	
2019	Nevrland	Kristjan	Paul Forman	17-year-old Jacob and 26-year-old Kristjan begin an intimate relationship after meeting in a video chat.	Austria	
2019	The Obituary of Tunde Johnson	Tunde Johnson	Steven Silver	Johnson is a Nigerian-American teenager who is in a secret relationship with his school's white lacrosse champion Soren.	United States	
2019	Pain and Glory	Salvador Mallo	Antonio Banderas	Retelling the story of Salvador's childhood in the 60s, when he emigrated with his poor parents to a small village in Valencia. (The story was inspired by director Pedro Almodóvar's personal experience.)	Spain	
2019	Rialto	Colm	Tom Vaughan-Lawlor	Colm is a closeted homosexual married to a woman. Jay is a hustler. They enter into an intimate relationship.	Ireland, United Kingdom	
2019	Rialto	Jay	Tom Glynn-Carney	Colm is a closeted homosexual married to a woman. Jay is a hustler. They enter into an intimate relationship.	Ireland, United Kingdom	
2019	Rocketman	Elton John	Taron Egerton	Biopic about the journey of singer-musician Elton John dealing with drug addiction and accepting his homosexuality.	United Kingdom, United States	
2019	Rocketman	John Reid	Richard Madden	Biopic about the journey of singer-musician Elton John dealing with drug addiction and accepting his homosexuality.	United Kingdom, United States	
2019	Straight Up	Ryder	James Scully	Ryder is Todd's longtime friend.	United States	
2019	Straight Up	Todd	James Sweeney	Ryder is Todd's longtime friend.	United States	
2019	Suk Suk	Hoi	Ben Yuen	Despite having families of their own, Hoi and Pak fell in love in their twilight years.	Hong Kong	
2019	Suk Suk	Pak	Tai Bo	Despite having families of their own, Hoi and Pak fell in love in their twilight years.	Hong Kong	
2019	Tremors	Pablo	Juan Pablo Olyslager	The film follows Pablo, a religious man in conversion therapy who is coping with the aftermath of having come out as gay after having spent many years married to a woman and fathering children.	Guatemala, France	
2019	What Men Want	Brandon Wallace	Josh Brener	Wallace is Ali's assistant.	United States	

== See also ==
- List of films featuring gay bathhouses
- List of gay characters in television
- List of LGBT-related films
- List of LGBT-related films by year
