= Irving Cheung =

Hong Kong production and costume designer (born 1982)

- 張蚊
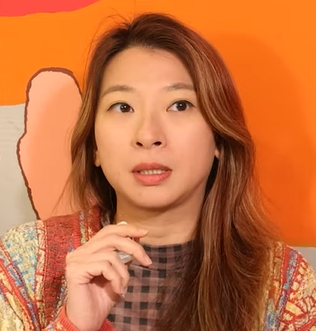
- Cheung in January 2025
- Born: Cheung Yee-man; 1982 (age 43–44); Hong Kong
- Education: University of the Arts London (BFA); Royal Melbourne Institute of Technology (MFA)
- Occupations: Production designer; Costume designer
- Years active: 2005–present
- Spouse: Unknown (m. 2015; div. 2018)
- Children: 1

Cheung Yee-man (Chinese: 張伊雯; born 1982), better known by her nickname Irving Cheung (張蚊), is a Hong Kong film production and costume designer. She has received six nominations for the Hong Kong Film Awards, including Best Art Direction for Rigor Mortis (2013), The Empty Hands (2017), Tracey (2018), Table for Six (2022), and Time Still Turns the Pages (2023), as well as a nomination for Best Costume Make Up Design for Tracey.

== Early life and education ==
Irving Cheung was born Cheung Yee-man in 1982 in Hong Kong. She has two sisters, both of whom studied film and pursued careers in the industry. Her eldest sister Purcy became a film producer, while her second sister Connie became a production designer in Hollywood. Cheung developed an interest in filmmaking after visiting her sisters' production sets at a young age, and became passionate about photography during secondary school. She credits Wong Kar-wai's films as a major influence on her aesthetics. Cheung studied abroad in Northern Ireland from the age of 11, and began working on her sisters' projects upon returning to Hong Kong during summer holidays since 15, which she considers valuable experience for her future in the film industry. She also suffered from scoliosis and underwent vertebral fixation surgery at the age of 15. Cheung earned a Bachelor of Fine Arts from the University of the Arts London. She and her family are survivors of the 7 July 2005 London bombings, where they were traveling in London at the time of the attacks. In 2015, she began studying for a part-time master's degree at Royal Melbourne Institute of Technology, graduating with a Master of Fine Arts in 2017.

== Career ==
In 2005, Cheung entered the film industry after graduating at the age of 23, working as a production assistant and apprenticing under production designer Silver Cheung. Her first project was Soi Cheang's Shamo, filmed in Thailand, followed by Tsui Hark's Missing. In 2010, she befriended director Scud while attending a philosophy course. Cheung landed her first solo production designer credit in Scud's 2011 film Love Actually... Sucks!. In 2013, she served as the art director for Juno Mak's directorial debut Rigor Mortis, earning a nomination for Best Art Direction in the 33rd Hong Kong Film Awards. Justin Chang described Cheung's art direction as "fastidiously grim, f/x-cluttered", resulting in a film that felt "monotonous" in his review for Variety. She continued as a production designer for Christopher Doyle's 2015 anthology film Hong Kong Trilogy: Preschooled Preoccupied Preposterous and Chapman To's 2016 comedy Let's Eat!. Cheung also collaborated with Scud as a costume designer on his drama Utopians, and took on another production designer role in To's gangster film The Mobfathers that same year.

In 2017, Cheung collaborated with Scud again on his drama Thirty Years of Adonis. She worked as both the production and costume designer for Chapman To's karate-themed sports film The Empty Hands, receiving her second nomination for Best Art Direction in the 37th Hong Kong Film Awards. Elizabeth Kerr of The Hollywood Reporter praised Cheung's production design as "impeccable", providing "a warm, tactile tone" for the film; while Lo Wai-keung of HK01 also commended Cheung's work on the Japanese dojo, noting that it was "full of charm". In the same year, she underwent another surgery for her scoliosis, which affected her ability to work continuously, prompting her to reduce her film commitments. In 2018, she wrote her first screenplay and joined the First Feature Film Initiative later in 2021. Cheung worked on Sunny Chan's drama Men on the Dragon, followed by dual roles as production and costume designer for the drama Tracey, earning nominations for both Best Art Direction and Best Costume Make Up Design in the 38th Hong Kong Film Awards.

After a hiatus due to COVID-19 pandemic and her pregnancy, Cheung worked as the production designer on the 2021 drama The Way We Keep Dancing and the 2022 horror film Social Distancing. She then served as production designer for Sunny Chan's film Table for Six, released in 2022. Due to budget constraints, her crew completed the main set—a city apartment—in just 16 days. Tara Judah of Screen Daily lauded Cheung's "colorful production design", which made the city apartment that serves as the film's sole set "feel like a lively playroom". She received another nomination for Best Art Direction in the 41st Hong Kong Film Awards. Cheung also founded a production company Mitsu Visual in the same year. In 2023, she served as the production designer for Nick Cheuk's directorial debut Time Still Turns the Pages, which earned her a fifth nomination for Best Art Direction in the 42nd Hong Kong Film Awards. She reprised her role as production designer in Table for Six's 2024 sequel Table for Six 2.

== Personal life ==
Cheung was married for three years and divorced in 2018. She gave birth to a daughter in 2020.

== Filmography ==
=== Film ===
Year	Title	Production designer	Costume designer	Notes/Ref.
2007	Shamo	No	No	As assistant production designer
2008	Missing	No	No	As assistant production designer
2011	Love Actually... Sucks!	Yes	No	
2013	Rigor Mortis	Yes	No	Credited as art director
2015	Hong Kong Trilogy: Preschooled Preoccupied Preposterous	Yes	No	
2016	Let's Eat!	Yes	No	
2016	Utopians	No	Yes	
2016	The Mobfathers	Yes	No	
2017	Thirty Years of Adonis	Yes	Yes	
2017	The Empty Hands	Yes	Yes	
2018	Men on the Dragon	Yes	No	
2018	Tracey	Yes	Yes	
2021	The Way We Keep Dancing	Yes	No	
2022	Social Distancing	Yes	No	
2022	Table for Six	Yes	No	
2023	Time Still Turns the Pages	Yes	No	
2024	Table for Six 2	Yes	No	

== Awards and nominations ==
Year	Award	Category	Work	Result	Ref.
2014	33rd Hong Kong Film Awards	Best Art Direction	Rigor Mortis	Nominated	
2018	37th Hong Kong Film Awards	Best Art Direction	The Empty Hands	Nominated	
2019	38th Hong Kong Film Awards	Best Art Direction	Tracey	Nominated	
2019	38th Hong Kong Film Awards	Best Costume Make Up Design	Tracey	Nominated	
2023	41st Hong Kong Film Awards	Best Art Direction	Table for Six	Nominated	
2024	42nd Hong Kong Film Awards	Best Art Direction	Time Still Turns the Pages	Nominated	
