= Self-discovery =

Person attempts to determine how they feel about spiritual issues or priorities

Hikes such as the Yana Trail on the Sacramento River Bend encourage self-discovery

A "journey of self-discovery" refers to a travel, pilgrimage, or series of events whereby a person attempts to determine how they feel, personally, about spiritual issues or priorities, rather than following the opinions of family, friends, neighborhood or peer pressure. The topic of self-discovery has been associated with Zen.

A related term is "finding oneself". There are different stages of finding oneself. Cultures from around the world have developed an array of modalities in the journey to discover oneself. In modern times practitioners and scientists have come together to create a map that brings clarity to the process of self-discovery. This is referred to as the levels of consciousness.

A journey of self-discovery is a popular theme in literature. It is sometimes used to drive the plot of a novel, play or film.

== Fiction ==
A journey of self-discovery is a popular theme in fiction. Drama films like Eat Pray Love (2010) and Life of Pi (2012) are examples of films associated with the idea of a journey of self-discovery.

=== Literature ===
- Hermann Hesse's Siddhartha (1922)
- Lobsang Rampa's The Third Eye (1956)
- Jack Kerouac's On the Road (1957)
- Ram Dass' Be Here Now (1971)
- Richard Matheson's What Dreams May Come (1978)
- Cormac McCarthy's All the Pretty Horses (1992)
- Yann Martel's Life of Pi (2001)
- Alice Sebold's The Lovely Bones (2002)
- Jonathan Safran Foer's Everything Is Illuminated (2002)
- Elizabeth Gilbert's Eat, Pray, Love (2006)
- Craig Thompson's Habibi (2011)
- Cheryl Strayed's Wild: From Lost to Found on the Pacific Crest Trail (2012)
- George Saunders' Lincoln in the Bardo (2017)

=== Film ===
- El Topo (1970) and The Holy Mountain (1973) by Alejandro Jodorowsky
- A film version of Siddhartha (1972)
- Monty Python's The Meaning of Life (1983) by Monty Python
- Little Buddha (1993) by Bernardo Bertolucci
- The Pillow Book (1996) by Peter Greenaway
- What Dreams May Come (1998) by Vincent Ward
- Samsara (2001) and Valley of Flowers (2006) by Pan Nalin
- Spring, Summer, Fall, Winter... and Spring (2003) by Kim Ki-duk
- A film version of Everything Is Illuminated (2005)
- The Fountain (2006) by Darren Aronofsky
- Enter the Void (2009) by Gaspar Noé
- Where the Wild Things Are (2009) by Spike Jonze
- Uncle Boonmee Who Can Recall His Past Lives (2010) and Cemetery of Splendour (2015) by Apichatpong Weerasethakul
- The Tree of Life (2011) by Terrence Malick
- Avalokitesvara (2013) by Zhang Xin
- Voyage (2013), Utopians (2015), Thirty Years of Adonis (2017), and Apostles (2022) by Scud
- Sodom's Cat (2016) by Ting-Chun Huang
- The Red Turtle (2016) by Michaël Dudok de Wit
- Please Stand By (2017) by Ben Lewin
- Marlina the Murderer in Four Acts (2017) by Mouly Surya
- Humba Dreams (2019) by Riri Riza
- Nine Days (2020) by Edson Oda
- Wendy (2020) by Benh Zeitlin
- Soul (2020) by Pete Docter
- Nomadland (2020) by Chloé Zhao
- Across the River and into the Trees (2022) by Peter Flannery
- Bardo, False Chronicle of a Handful of Truths (2022) by Alejandro González Iñárritu
- Samsara (2023) by Lois Patiño

== See also ==
- Coming of age – reaching maturity, from childhood to adulthood
- Cultural identity
- Existential crisis
- Hero's journey
- Identity (social science)
- Identity formation
- Introspection
- Know thyself
- Maturity (psychological)
- New Age movement
- Personal development
- Personal identity
- Philosophy of life
- Psychology of self
- Religious views on the self
- Self-realization
- Self-reflection
- Stream of consciousness (psychology)
- Visionary fiction
