= Thomas Price (actor) =

Tom Price
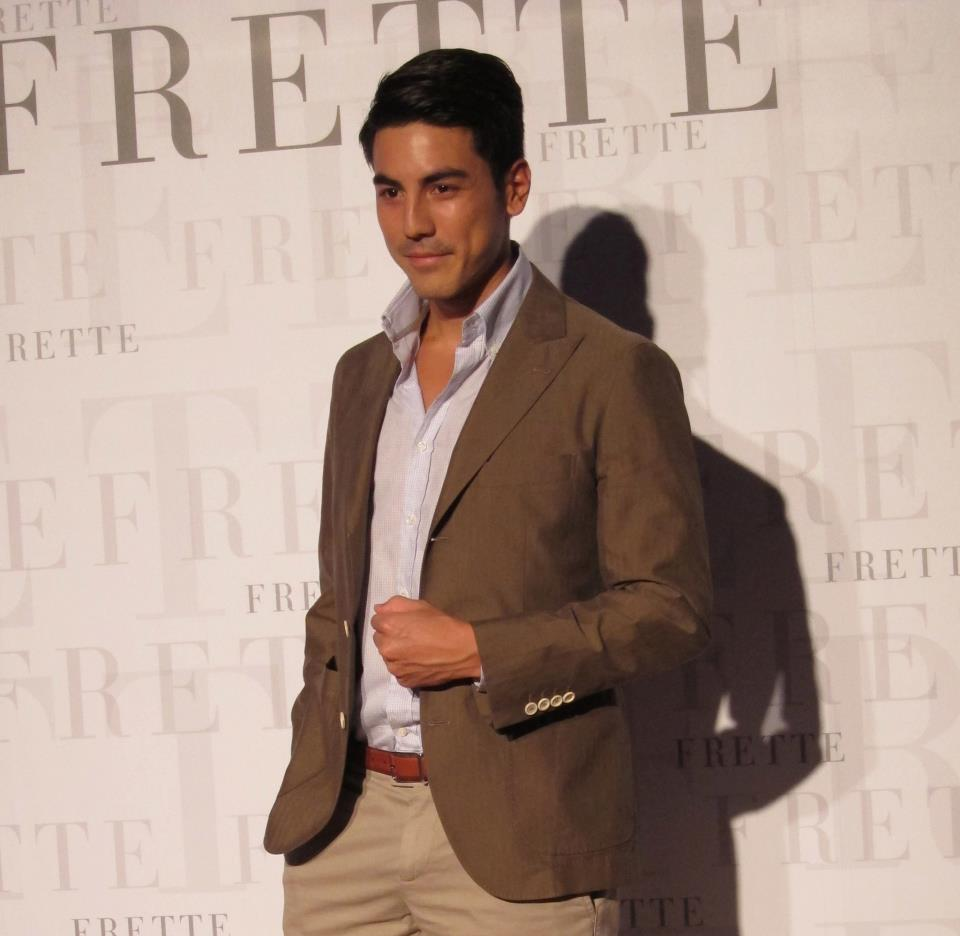
- Price in 2012
- Born: 1 November 1985 (age 40); Hong Kong
- Education: University of Sydney
- Occupations: Actor; DJ; model
- Years active: 2006–present

Chinese name
- Traditional Chinese: 白梓軒
- Simplified Chinese: 白梓轩
Transcriptions
Standard Mandarin
- Hanyu Pinyin: Bái Zǐ Xuān

Thomas Price, professionally known as Tom Price, is a Hong Kong-born actor known for his roles in S.M.A.R.T. Chase and Amphetamine.

== Career ==
Price was the joint lead, with Byron Pang, in the film Amphetamine. He played the character of Daniel.

He appeared as Ciem in S.M.A.R.T. Chase.

== Filmography ==
=== Films ===
Year	Title	Chinese title	Role	Notes/Ref.
2018	Dream Journey 4: Biography of Demon	大夢西遊4伏妖記	Zeng Tang	
2017	S.M.A.R.T. Chase	極致追擊	Ciem	
2015	This Is Me	年少輕狂	George	
2015	A Choo	我的情敵是超人		
2015	Love, At First	愛之初體驗		
2014	Design 7 Love	相愛的七種設計	Mark	
2010	Amphetamine	安非他命	Daniel	
2009	Permanent Residence	永久居留	Jimmy	
2008	City Without Baseball	無野之城	Daniel	
2008	Hong Kong Bronx	黑勢力	Voinne's boyfriend	
2007	Trivial Matters	破事兒	Stephy's boyfriend	
2007	Love Is Not All Around	十分愛	Vincent	
2026	Cold War 1994	寒戰1994	Walter Brown	

=== Television series ===
Year	Title	Chinese title	Role	Notes
2016	Demon Girl	半妖傾城	Doctor	
2016	Xiao Zhang Fu	小丈夫	George	
2016	Memory Lost	美人為餡	Captain Qin	
2015	Leo	星座愛情獅子女	Michael	
2013	Big Red Riding Hood	大紅帽與小野狼	子煊	
2012	Double Bonus	雙星報喜	Romeo Yang; Little Fortune God (possessed)	
2012	I Love You So Much	粉愛粉愛你	Daniel	
2011	Love You	醉後決定愛上你	Rickie Xiang (向霆威)	
2006	Crossing	過渡青春	Tom	
