= Sean Li =

Sean Li Wai Ting (李偉霆) is a film actor. He was born in Hong Kong and educated in the United Kingdom and the United States.

== Education ==
Li was educated at Hurstpierpoint College, an independent school near the village of Hurstpierpoint in West Sussex, before attending the University of Bath in the city of Bath in the UK, where he studied engineering, and at the Lee Strasberg Theatre and Film Institute in New York City.

== Life and career ==
Li was the joint lead, co-starring with Osman Hung, in the film Permanent Residence, playing the character 'Ivan' This film is the first of a Hong Kong film trilogy by award-winning Hong Kong film director Danny Cheng Wan-Cheung (who has adopted the stage name Scud). It is an unconventional choice of subject matter for Hong Kong cinema in both its examination of male homosexual love and the marital strain resulting from self-denial of that love; it examines the 'limits of life', while the second in the trilogy, Amphetamine, explores this theme further in the 'limits of passion'. Li appeared in an earlier film, City Without Baseball, which tentatively explores a similar theme, although in a much more diffused way. The third, as yet unreleased, film in the trilogy, Life of an Artist, examines the 'limits of art'.

In Permanent Residence, Li's character, named Ivan, is a young gay man who seeks a long-term relationship with a straight friend. The friend is aware of Li's inclination, and is happy to befriend him, but is very reluctant to express open affection for him or to become emotionally involved. The film is claimed by its director, Scud, to be a semi-autobiographical account of his own life.

== Filmography ==
- The Scrying (2015) – Zayden
- Camera (2014) – Ming
- Dual Crisis (2011) – Simon
- Permanent Residence (2009) – Ivan
- City Without Baseball (2008) – Bartender
- Have a Ball (short experimental film)

== Awards and nominations ==
Year	Award	Category	Work	Result
2010	Chinese Film Media Awards	Best New Actor	Permanent Residence	Won
