= Ron Heung =

Adrian "Ron" Heung
- Born: 1985 (age 40–41); Hong Kong
- Occupations: Baseball player; actor; art director

Chinese name
Transcriptions
Standard Mandarin
- Hanyu Pinyin: Xiāng Zǐjùn
Yue: Cantonese
- Jyutping: Hoeng1 Zi2-zeon3

Adrian "Ron" Heung Tze-Chun (born 1985), is a Hong Kong baseball player, actor, and art director. He has appeared in a lead role in two films and as a supporting player in two others. He was also art director for the film Permanent Residence in 2009, and in the same year, appeared in the Hong Kong action film Rebellion (2009) as Chung. The following year, he worked in the art department for Amphetamine and in 2013, appeared as Adrian in the acclaimed Hong Kong film Voyage, set across Europe and Asia, and filmed in the English language.

Heung was first discovered by award-winning Hong Kong filmmaker Scud (the working name of Danny Cheng Wan-Cheung), while Heung was a member of the Hong Kong national baseball team, in which capacity he appeared in his first film, City Without Baseball. Unusually for a Hong Kong film, both Heung and the team were shown naked on camera, with their private parts fully revealed in several scenes.

== Filmography ==
Actor

- Voyage (2013) as Adrian
- Rock On! (2010)
- Amphetamine (2010) as Daniel's friend
- Rebellion (2009) as Chung
- City Without Baseball (2008) as Ron

Art Department

- Amphetamine (2010)

Art Director

- Permanent Residence (2009)

== Joined team ==
- 1992 Tigers (Minor B)
- 1994 Lions (Minor A)
- 1995 Martins (Minor A)
- 1996 Dragons (Major)
- 1997 Dragons (Major)
- 1998 Tigers (Senior)
- 1999 Tigers (Senior)
