= City Without Baseball =

2008 Hong Kong film by Lawrence Ah Mon

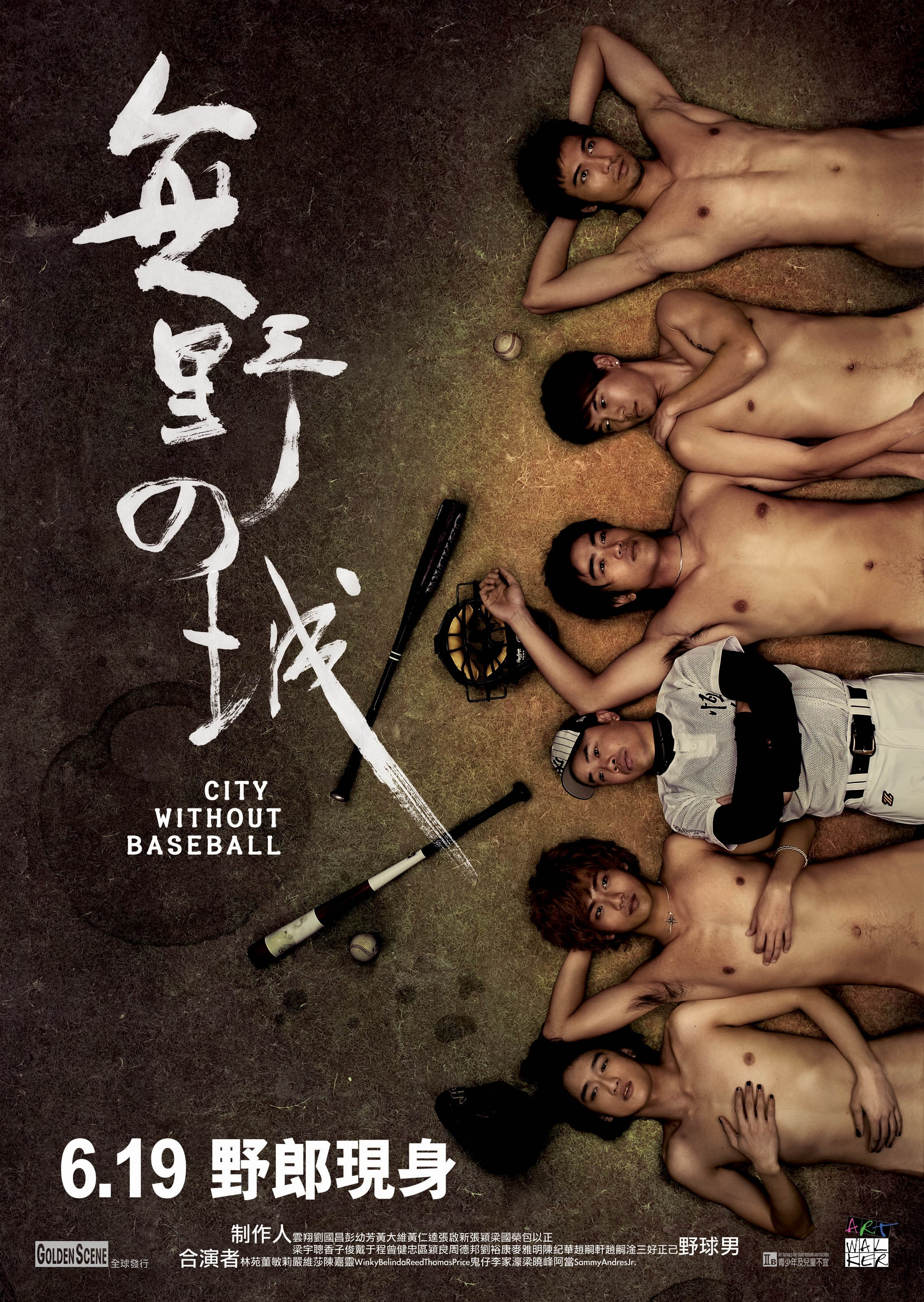
- Theatrical release poster
- Directed by: Lawrence Ah Mon
- Written by: Scud (production-crediting name of Danny Cheng Wan-Cheung)
- Produced by: Heman Peng
- Starring: Ron Heung Tze-Chun; Leung Yu-Chung; Yuan Lin; John Tai Ji-Ching; Monie Tung Man-Lee
- Cinematography: Ying Zhang
- Edited by: Kwok-Wing Leung (as Jacky Leung)
- Music by: Eugene Pao
- Production company: ArtWalker Productions
- Distributed by: Golden Scene (2007) (worldwide) (all media)
- Release date: April 2008
- Running time: 100 minutes
- Country: Hong Kong
- Language: Cantonese

City Without Baseball (Chinese: 無野之城; stylized: 無野の城; jyutping: mou^{4} je^{5} zi^{1} sing^{4}) is a 2008 Hong Kong drama film starring Ron Heung and other members of the Hong Kong National Baseball Team. It is directed by South African-born Hong Kong filmmaker Lawrence Ah Mon, about a city where baseball is almost unknown, and where the team plays to empty stadiums. The film explores several themes traditionally regarded as "taboo" in Hong Kong society.

City Without Baseball is the first of eleven publicly released films by Scud (the production-crediting name of Hong Kong writer/director/film producer Danny Cheng Wan-Cheung). The other films include: Permanent Residence (2009), Amphetamine (2010), Love Actually... Sucks! (2011), Voyage (2013), Utopians (2015) and Thirty Years of Adonis (2017). His eighth film, Apostles, was made in 2022, as was the ninth, Bodyshop. Scud's tenth and eleventh films (his final projects prior to retirement), Naked Nations: Hong Kong Tribe and Ghosts Just Wanna Have Fun, were produced in 2024.

== Plot ==
The actual members of the Hong Kong National Baseball Team appear in the film as themselves, in a story set in 2004. Their isolated existence leads them to take unconventional choices in both love and friendship, and to summon great courage in the face of their lonely and disconnected existence. The story focuses on the easy-going, yet often detached, main character, Ronnie, as played by Ron Heung, and his friendships and relationships with others, both on and off the sports field.

== Cast ==
- Yu Chung Leung as Chung - Pitcher
- Ron Heung as Ron - Pitcher (as Tze Chun Ron Heung)
- John Tai as Coach Tai
- Jason Tsang as Jason - Catcher
- Jose Au as Jose - Captain (billed as Wing Leung Jose Au)
- Yu Hong Lau as Hong - Second Baseman
- Peter Mak as Peter - Right Outfielder
- Herman Chan as Wah - Middle Outfielder
- Jackie Chow as Jackie - Third Baseman
- Julian Chiu as Julian - First Baseman
- Kenneth Chiu as Kenneth - Pitcher
- Yuan Lin as Meizi (billed as Gia Lin)
- Monie Tung as Kim
- Wei-Sha Yan as Ping (billed as Wei Sha Yan)
- Sean Au as Sir Au
- Allan Mak as Sir Mak
- David Wong as Sir Wong
- Ryan Williams as Kevin
- Calina Chan as Ron's mother
- Winky Wong as Ron's sister
- Belinda Reed as Chung's blonde girlfriend
- Anjo Leung as Bartender / Violinist
- Sean Li as Bartender
- Thomas Price as Daniel / Cable guy (billed as Tom Price)
- Thomas Lee as Ron's new room-mate (billed as Chi Wai Thomas Lee)
- Stanley Kong as Jose's boss
- Heman Peng as Record producer
- Debbie Li as Producer's assistant
- Sammy Andres Jr. as Lead singer
- Ka Wai Chan as Double Bass Player
- Ying Leung Lau as Doctor
- Eva Lo as Ron's ex-girlfriend (billed as Hiu Pui Eva Lo)
- Jimmie Poon as Librarian man
- Shuk Kwan Chen as Ping's Double
- Scud as Teammate

== Awards ==
- 2008 Hong Kong Film Critics Society Awards Winners for Top 7 Suggested Films
- 2008 Taiwan Film Critics Society Awards Winners for Top 10 Best Chinese Films

== Home media ==
A Panorama Distributions Co.:

- VCD first became available on 2008-10-03 (3 October 2008)
- DVD (DVD Region 3) first became available on 2008-10-10 (10 October 2008)
- Blu-ray Disc first became available on 2011-06-03 (3 June 2011)

== See also ==
- Hong Kong films of 2008
- List of baseball films
- List of lesbian, gay, bisexual or transgender-related films
- List of lesbian, gay, bisexual, or transgender-related films by storyline
- Nudity in film (East Asian cinema since 1929)
- Weeds on Fire another baseball themed Hong Kong film
