= Osman Hung =

Hong Kong actor and singer-songwriter

Osman Hung Chi-kit
- Born: March 20, 1979 (age 47); British Hong Kong
- Occupations: Actor; singer-songwriter
- Years active: 1999–present

Chinese name
- Traditional Chinese: 洪智傑
- Simplified Chinese: 洪智杰
Transcriptions
Standard Mandarin
- Hanyu Pinyin: Hóng Zhìjié
Yue: Cantonese
- Jyutping: Hung4 Zi3-git6

Osman Hung Chi-kit (born 20 March 1979) is a Hong Kong actor and singer-songwriter of the Cantopop group EO2.

== Life and career ==
Hung has appeared in several films, and in 2009 took the joint-lead role in Permanent Residence, playing the character Windson alongside Sean Li. He also sang the track "Truly Madly Deeply" for the same film. The story is an unconventional choice of subject matter for Hong Kong cinema in both its examination of male homosexual love and the marital strain resulting from self-denial of that love; it examines the 'limits of life', while the second in the trilogy, Amphetamine, explores this theme further in the 'limits of passion'. The third, as yet unreleased, film in the trilogy, Life of an Artist, examines the 'limits of art'.

In Permanent Residence, Hung's character, named Windson, is a straight young man who is befriended by a young gay man, Ivan (played by Sean Li), seeking a long-term relationship. The film is claimed by its director, Scud, to be a largely semi-autobiographical account of his own life.

Unusually for a comparatively well-known performer, and unlike the conventional appearances of adult males in Hong Kong films, Hung appears naked many times in the film, with his private parts fully exposed on camera, together with his co-star Sean Li. Hung later appeared as the character 'Spider' in the 2011 Hong Kong film Love Actually... Sucks!, with his private parts again fully revealed as he walks naked on a mountain top.

Hung appeared in the Hong Kong films Infernal Affairs (2002) and Breezy Summer (2004) with fellow members of his Cantopop group EO2.

== Filmography ==
- He's a Woman, She's a Man (1994) ... Audition contestant #9
- Infernal Affairs (2002) ... one of Triad boss Hon Sam's men
- The New Option (2002) ... Huang's brother
- Snake Charmer (2002) ... senator's son
- Zero (2003) ... Fong Hok-Man
- Give Them a Chance (2003) ... Jack
- Men Suddenly in Black (2003) ... reporter
- Breezy Summer (2004) ... Osman
- Undercover (2007)
- Tactical Unit - No Way Out (2008) ... PC Chung
- Tactical Unit - Partners (2008) ... PTU
- Permanent Residence (2009) ... Windson
- Love Actually... Sucks! (2011) ... Spider
