= Voyage (2013 film) =

2013 Hong Kong film by Scud

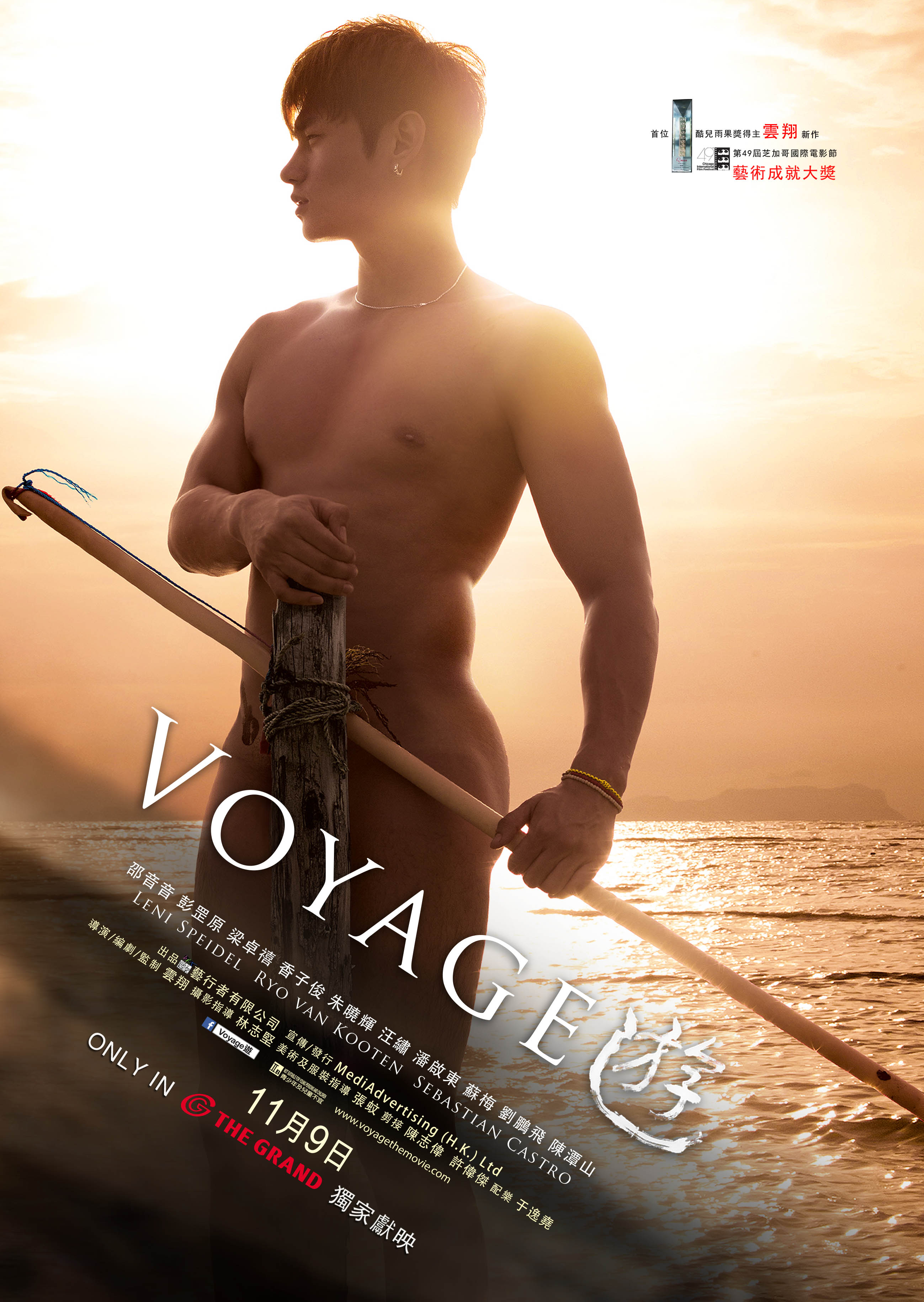
- Poster
- 遊
- Directed by: Scud
- Written by: Scud
- Produced by: Annie Lau; Leni Speidel
- Starring: Ryo van Kooten; Sebastian Castro; Adrian Ron Heung; Leon Hill; Haze Leung; Byron Pang Koon Kei; Jason Poon; Debra Baker; Susan Siu; Linda So; Leni Speidel
- Cinematography: Charlie Lam
- Edited by: Andrew Chan; Matthew Hui
- Music by: Yu Yat-Yiu
- Production company: ArtWalker Productions
- Distributed by: Golden Scene
- Release dates: 20 October 2013 (CIFF); 20 December 2013 (Taiwan)
- Running time: 100 minutes
- Country: Hong Kong
- Languages: English; Cantonese

Voyage (Chinese: 遊) is a 2013 film by the acclaimed Hong Kong filmmaker Scud, the production-crediting name of Danny Cheng Wan-Cheung. It is described as "a tragic story about love, fate and the struggle of losing loved ones", and received its world premiere on 20 October 2013 at the Chicago International Film Festival. Voyage was filmed in Hong Kong, Mongolia, Malaysia, Australia, Germany and the Netherlands, and is the director's first film partially made outside Asia, and also his first to be filmed mostly in the English language. It explores several themes traditionally regarded as "taboo" in Hong Kong society in an unusually open, convention-defying way, and features full-frontal male nudity in several scenes.

== Plot ==
Voyage centers on a young psychiatrist (played by Ryo van Kooten) who leaves Hong Kong to embark on a long lone voyage from Hong Kong along the coast of South-East Asia to try to overcome the emotional turmoil he has experienced in his relationships with former clients. While traveling, he tries to come to terms with his experiences by making a detailed record of their stories, and decides to visit those places himself.

The film's director, Scud, explained that the idea for the film "originated from my own thoughts about suicide. One time, I had thought about walking into the central Australian desert until I am exhausted and die in a miserable way. These thoughts caused me to think about similar people in this situation." He continued that "All of the episodes are independent of each other and the stories are based on real experiences which some of the actors appearing in the film have gone through. Having an international cast and locations around the world is appropriate because depression and suicide are universal themes".

== Main cast ==
- Ryo van Kooten ... Ryo
- Sebastian Castro ... Sebastian
- Adrian Ron Heung ... Adrian
- Leon Hill ... Ryo's Father
- Haze Leung ... Ming
- Byron Pang ... Yuan
- Jason Poon ... Jip
- Debra Baker ... Suzanna Schwaering
- Siu Yam-yam ... Lady Red
- Linda So ... Linda So
- Leni Speidel ... Leni

== Production ==
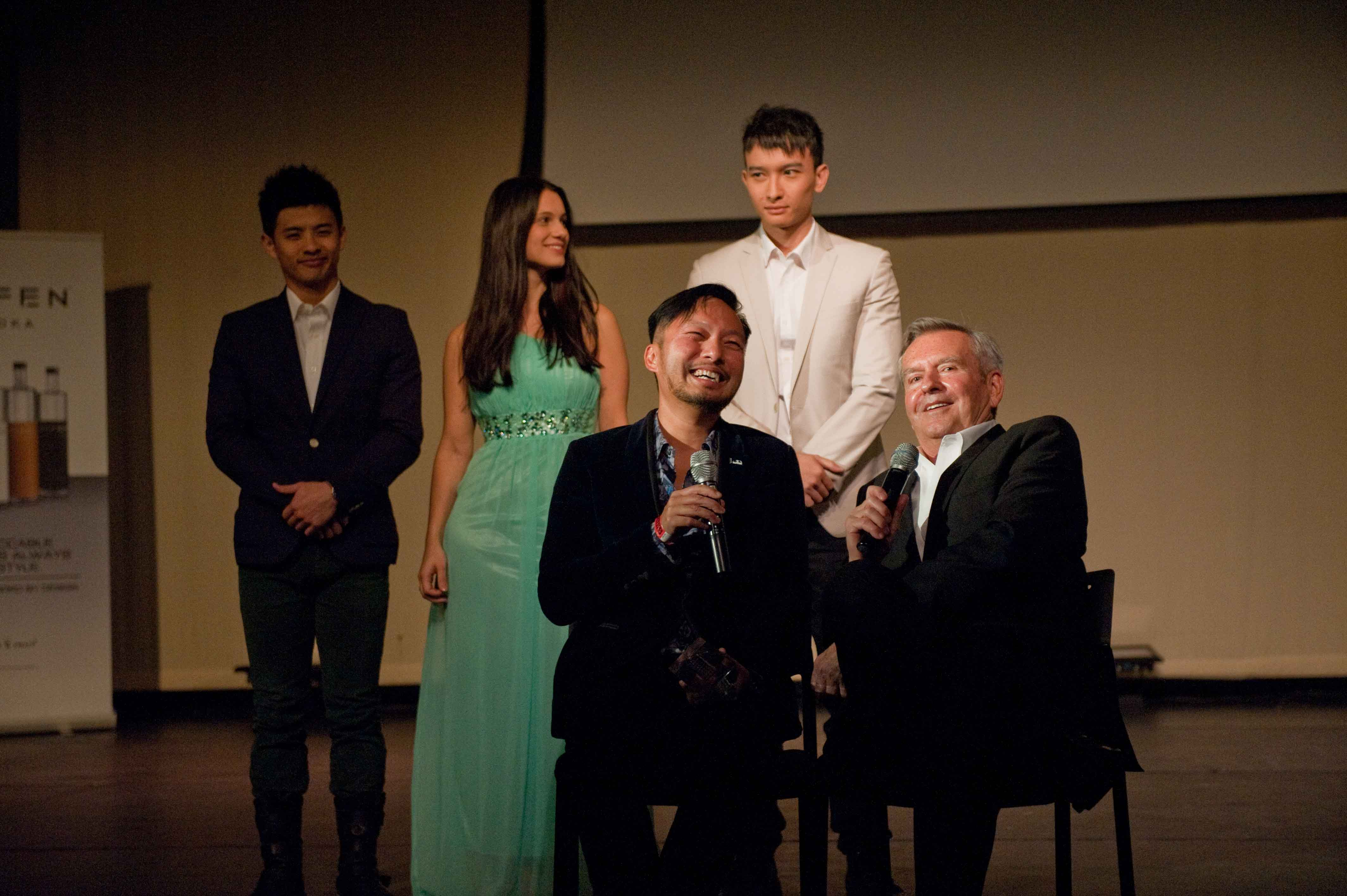

Filming of Voyage began in September 2011 in the city of Hanover in Germany, and was Scud's first film set outside Asia. It stars the Peruvian-Japanese American actor, singer and visual artist Sebastian Castro, very popular in Asia, who was also commissioned to produce some original art for the film.

Voyage features many of Scud's colleagues from previous films, such as the actors Byron Pang, Haze Leung, Adrian "Ron" Heung, and Linda So, as well as several technical staff, such as director of photography Charlie Lam, who worked on Scud's 2010 film Amphetamine. During filming, Scud said, "I am really enjoying shooting in Europe because people are so film-friendly.. I can see myself coming back to film again in Europe". The German episode includes appearances by the UK actress Debra Baker (Junkhearts) and the German actress Leni Speidel, who was also the production manager for filming in Europe.

== Home media ==
A two-disc Sky Digi Entertainment (Taiwan) edition of Voyage was released internationally on DVD on 29 September 2014.

== Films by the same director ==
| Name of film | Year released |
|---|---|
| City Without Baseball | 2008 |
| Permanent Residence | 2009 |
| Amphetamine | 2010 |
| Love Actually... Sucks! | 2011 |
| Utopians | 2015 |
| Thirty Years of Adonis | 2017 |
| Apostles | 2022 |
| Bodyshop | 2023 |
| Naked Nations: Hong Kong Tribe | 2024 |
| Ghosts Just Wanna Have Fun | 2024 |

== See also ==
- List of Hong Kong films of 2013
- List of lesbian, gay, bisexual or transgender-related films
- List of lesbian, gay, bisexual, or transgender-related films by storyline
- Nudity in film (East Asian cinema since 1929)
