= Amphetamine (disambiguation) =

Amphetamine is a stimulant drug.

Amphetamine may also refer to:

== Chemicals ==
- Adderall, a brand of mixed amphetamine salts
- Dextroamphetamine (dexamfetamine, (D)-amphetamine), the drug's dextrorotatory enantiomer
- Levoamphetamine (levamfetamine, (L)-amphetamine), the drug's levorotatory enantiomer
- Lisdexamfetamine, a prodrug of dextroamphetamine marketed under the brand name Vyvanse
- Substituted amphetamine, a class of chemical compounds based upon the amphetamine structure

== Entertainment ==
- Amphetamine (film), a 2010 Hong Kong film
- Amphetamine Reptile Records, an American record label
- "Amphetamine", a song by Everclear from So Much for the Afterglow

== See also ==
- History and culture of amphetamines
