= Seb Castro =

American actor, singer and YouTube contributor (born 1989)

Sebastian Castro
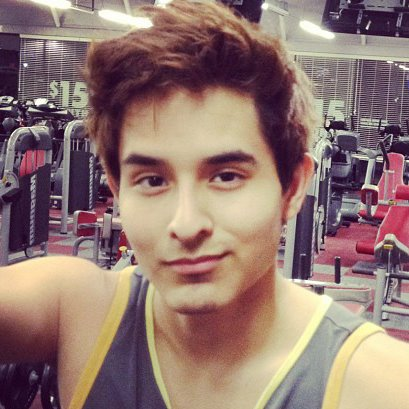
- Born: Benjamin Brian Castro; December 22, 1989 (age 36); Oceanside, New York, U.S
- Other names: Seb Castro, Brian Castro
- Occupations: Actor, singer, online personality
- Years active: 2013–present

Benjamin Brian Castro (born December 22, 1989), better known by his stage name Sebastian Castro, is an American actor, singer, and YouTube contributor. He is an internet celebrity with a sizeable following in Southeast Asia.

Castro is most widely known for his viral gay-themed music video "Bubble," which garnered over three million views. "Bubble" brought Castro fame across Southeast Asia, most visibly in the Philippines and Indonesia.

== Early and personal life ==
Born on Long Island, New York, Castro was raised in both New York and Georgia. At age 17, he was shunned by his parents (both Jehovah's Witnesses) for being gay, leading him to finance his education independently in the Savannah College of Art and Design.

Sebastian Castro came out as gay on a Philippine podcast Beki Nights shortly after releasing his viral music video. When asked why he chose to come out on the GMA Network show H.O.T. TV, he responded, "I know there are lots of people out there that are scared to be themselves."

In 2014, Sebastian Castro and former ABS-CBN Reporter Ryan Chua publicly acknowledged their relationship over social media. Castro made the announcement during a trip to London where Ryan was undergoing a masters program at City University of London. After a public four-year relationship, the two separated in September 2017.

In April of the following year, several showbiz outlets romantically linked Castro to actor and television host Paolo Ballesteros after photos of them together surfaced. Neither ever publicly commented on the rumors. In June, Castro acknowledged he had a relationship that ended, but never identified the other party.

== Career ==
On February 14, 2013, Castro's first music video "Bubble" appeared on YouTube, quickly garnering over 3 million views. Bubble further popularized the dance crazy "Bubble Pop," particularly in the Philippines. The music video was Sebastian Castro's "coming out." Prior to releasing the homo-erotic Bubble music video, Castro was not publicly open about his sexuality.

Castro has landed several major product endorsements in SouthEast Asia, including Jollibee, Pantene Hair, and Sun Cellular. He was featured among the Philippine Cosmopolitan Bachelors of 2012 and is currently an endorser of Fujifilm, Durex, Cathy Valencia, and Blued.

After being cast in several minor and supporting roles on TV and Film over the course of five years, Sebastian Castro appeared in his first lead role in full feature film 4 Days (2017), an independent film by Filipino director Adolfo Alix Jr.

PLM Film Society heralded the film as "one of the more inventive films of the genre in recent memory," adding "Mikoy Morales and Sebastian Castro complement each other onscreen, Morales with his tough and heartbreaking take on Mark, and Castro filling Derek full of reservations, doubts and an unspoken multitude of feelings."

== Filmography ==
=== Film ===
Year	Title	Role	Company
2013	Voyage	Sebastian	ArtWalker Studios
2015	Mrs.	Sonny Boy	Independent, FLT Films International
2016	4 Days	Derek Hernandez	Independent
2017	Bar Boys	Atty. Victor Cruz	TropicFrills Film Productions, Quantum Films
2018	Bakwit Boys	Oscar	T-Rex Entertainment Productions
2018	Urban Legends	Leon	Independent
