= Tracey (film) =

2018 Hong Kong film by Jun Li

- Film poster
- Traditional Chinese: 翠絲
- Simplified Chinese: 翠丝
- Hanyu Pinyin: Cuì Sī
- Jyutping: Ceoi3 Si1
- Directed by: Jun Li
- Screenplay by: Shu Kei; Erica Li; Jun Li
- Produced by: Shu Kei; Jacqueline Liu
- Starring: Philip Keung; Kara Wai
- Cinematography: Tam Wan-kai
- Edited by: Li Ko
- Music by: Otomo Yoshihide
- Production companies: One Cool Film Production; PJ One Cool Film; Sun Entertainment Culture; Big Honor Entertainment; Hong Music Venue
- Distributed by: One Cool Pictures
- Release dates: 28 October 2018 (Tokyo International Film Festival); 22 November 2018 (Hong Kong)
- Running time: 119 minutes
- Country: Hong Kong
- Language: Cantonese

Tracey is a 2018 Hong Kong drama film written and directed by Jun Li and starring Philip Keung as the titular protagonist, a 51-year-old married man and father whose craving for feminization increases, leading him to transition from male to female both mentally and physically. Filming for Tracey began on 5 December 2017 and the film premiered at the 2018 Tokyo International Film Festival on 28 October 2018 before it was theatrically released on 22 November 2018 in Hong Kong.

== Plot ==
Travis Tung's family consists of wife Anne, son Vincent, and daughter Brigitte (who lives with her husband Jeffrey). Vincent describes his mother as having mysophobia and being racist against their housekeeper. She prohibits sex in the house, which is interesting as she and her husband sleep in separate rooms. After going to work, Tung secretly changes into women's underwear underneath their clothing.

While taking their dog Bowie (named after the singer) for a walk, Tung thinks they spot an old friend and chases after them, only to find that Bowie has succumbed to an unknown illness. The family is distraught at their dog's death, and a pregnant Brigitte stays the night, citing that she doesn't want to wake up her husband.

It is revealed that Tung's childhood friend, Ko Ching, has died overseas. With friend Chi Chun, Tung goes to the airport to pick up Bond Tann, Ching's husband. Bond has had trouble at customs as security has taken away Ching's ashes. Bond comments that Hong Kong is a "backwards country" due to its discrimination on sexuality. Tung states that they will ask their son-in-law for legal advice as he is a lawyer.

At a small performance of an opera troupe, including their wife Anne, Tung sees the old friend for the first time in decades. Fa Yim-hung, known affectionately as Brother Darling, is a Cantonese actor who was famous for playing women's roles in operas. They knew each other when Tung was younger, working in a restaurant with Brother Darling. Tung recalls an incident in which there was a "peeper" in the ladies' room, only it was actually Brother Darling. Brother Darling reveals that they cannot pee standing up because although they were "born with a male body", they are actually a woman.

Back at home, the family argues about Brigitte's options because Jeffrey has been unfaithful. She is considering abortion and divorce, but Anne insists that sh will have nothing if she leaves her husband. Vincent leaves to be with his girlfriend, a tattoo artist, who says that she gets this artwork done on herself because "my body belongs to me."

Tung visits Bond at his hotel room to find him sobbing. They cry together on opposite sides of the door before coming together. They reminisce about Ching, discovering that Tung and him had a requited love at their age but never acted upon it. Bond and Tung kiss, Bond unbuttoning Tung's shirt to find women's lingerie. Embarrassed, Tung leaves in a hurry.

Bond and Tung later reconvene at a pond where the three friends used to meet all the time. Tung comes out to him there, saying, "I am a woman, not outside, but deep inside." Tung knew they were different at an early age, but at first thought they were gay. When they discovered their gender identity, Tung thought they couldn't be with Ching because he was a gay man and wouldn't see them as a woman. Tung used to stuff bras, wear women's underwear, and tuck in secret, stating "I detested my body" and that "when there are things you can't contain, you look for substitutes", citing peeing while sitting down and their habit of changing into women's lingerie at work. When Tung's father was murdered, they were forced to become the "man" of the house.

Back at home, Anne reveals that she has found receipts from the women's lingerie store that Tung frequents. Tung tries lying, saying they're for their mother, then for Brother Darling, but ultimately assuages her when they say that they're not gay.

Tung, Bond, and Chun go to sea to spread Ching's ashes. There, Tung comes out to Chun, who accepts them and Ching's homosexuality.

Tung introduces Bond and Chun to Brother Darling. They decide to have makeovers and head to a club as trans women in full hair and dress. Both Tung and Brother Darling are having the time of their lives and Brother Darling exclaims that "I can finally use the ladies' room!" Unfortunately, Brother Darling passes out in the bathroom and the group has to rush her to the hospital. Entering the taxi, Tung and her son Vincent see each other before leaving. Brother Darling has died. Vincent is actively ignoring Tung's messages, when his girlfriend calls out his hypocrisy: "So it's okay for others to be gay, but not your own family."

Tung goes home, still in full women's wear, and tries to come out to Anne, but she becomes hostile and insists that Tung is just sick and being selfish. Distraught, Tung attempts to cut off her genitalia to no avail.

Time jump to seven months later: Brigitte has had her child and Tung is now a grandmother. Tung goes to Anne's latest performance on Vincent's advice. Anne still refuses to sign the divorce papers and laments to her son, "why force me to accept this?"

Another seven months have passed, and Tung has undergone gender affirmation surgery, stating, "Farewell Travis Tung". She is now Tracey, named after her mother. Tracey and Bond reconvene after a gallery and become physically intimate. Tracey visits her blind mother, who says, "Male or female, you're always my child."

== Cast ==
- Philip Keung as Travis Tung (佟大雄), the film's 51-year-old protagonist who names himself Tracey (翠絲) after transitioning from male to female.
  - Zeno Koo as Young Travis.
- Kara Wai as Anne (安宜), Travis' 49-year-old wife who is a Cantonese opera actress.
- Eric Kot as Chi Chun (池俊), Travis' friend.
  - Kaki Sham as Young Chi Chun
- Lily Leung as Tracey (翠絲), Travis' mother.
- River Huang as Bond Tann (阿邦), Travis' friend who is a writer.
- Ben Yuen as Fa Yim-hung (花艷紅), known as Brother Darling (打鈴哥), a Cantonese opera actor who performs in Dan roles.
- Jennifer Yu as Brigitte Tung (佟碧兒), Travis' and Anne's daughter.
- Ng Siu-hin as Vincent Tung (佟立賢), Travis' and Anne's son.
- Aaron Chow as Jeffrey, Brigitte's husband.
- Panther Chan as Ka-yan (嘉欣), Vincent's girlfriend who is a tattoo artist.
- Wong Yat-ho as Ko Ching (高正), Travis' friend and Bond's husband.
- Cheung Kwok-keung as Old Master (老爺).
- Cheung Yu-hei as a girl infant.
- Kit Cheung as a bully.
- Audrey Chan as a news anchor.
- Ansheles Artem as a cafe waiter.
- Pang Ngan-ling as Travis' younger sister.
- Raymond Chan as himself, a member of the Legislative Council of Hong Kong.
- Hui Ka-ki as a Cantonese opera actor.
- Lee Chak-yan as a Cantonese opera actor.
- Lam Yu-tung as a Cantonese opera actor.
- Percy Mou as a Cantonese opera actress.
- Hon Tak-kwong as a Cantonese opera actor.
- Kwong Shun-yan as a Cantonese opera actress.
- Vikki Fung as a Cantonese opera actress.
- Elle Chan as a Cantonese opera actress.
- Lee Hiu-ngai as a social worker.

== Production ==
Principal photography for Tracey began on 5 December 2017. Philip Keung, who plays the title character, originally felt he was unable to grasp the role of a transgender woman and wanted to decline it, but changed his mind after doing research and meeting with real life transgender people and felt they had many stories that need to be told. Keung also revealed that during filming, he would wear see-through clothes when he went out to the streets to see how pedestrians would react to him.

== Release ==
The film released its first teaser trailer and poster at the 2018 Hong Kong Filmart on 18 March 2018. The poster, which features Keung wearing a blouse and pantyhose, attracted strong attention on the internet, with many internet users praising Keung's look and anticipating his performance in the film.

== Critical reception ==
On Rotten Tomatoes, Tracey has an approval rating of 60% based on five reviews, with an average rating of 5.8/10.

Elizabeth Kerr of The Hollywood Reporter praises the film's high production standards and its moving and thought-provoking drama, as well as the performances by Philip Keung, Kara Wai and Ben Yuen. Edmund Lee of the South China Morning Post gave the film a score of 4/5 stars praising the acting performances and nuanced writing.

== Awards and nominations ==
Ceremony	Category	Recipient	Results
37th Hong Kong Film Awards	Best Actor	Philip Keung	Nominated
37th Hong Kong Film Awards	Best Supporting Actor	Ben Yuen	Won
37th Hong Kong Film Awards	Best Supporting Actress	Kara Wai	Won
37th Hong Kong Film Awards	Best Screenplay	Shu Kei, Erica Li, Jun Li	Nominated
37th Hong Kong Film Awards	Best New Director	Jun Li	Nominated
37th Hong Kong Film Awards	Best Art Direction	Irving Cheung	Nominated
37th Hong Kong Film Awards	Best Costume Make Up Design	Irving Cheung	Nominated
37th Hong Kong Film Awards	Best Original Film Score	Otomo Yoshihide	Nominated
37th Hong Kong Film Awards	Best Original Film Song	Song: Tracey Composer/Lyricist/Singer: Panther Chan	Nominated
55th Golden Horse Awards	Best Supporting Actor	Ben Yuen	Won
55th Golden Horse Awards	Best Supporting Actress	Kara Wai	Nominated
25th Hong Kong Film Critics Society Award	Best Actor	Philip Keung	Nominated
25th Hong Kong Film Critics Society Award	Best Actor	Ben Yuen	Nominated
13th Asian Film Awards	Best Supporting Actor	River Huang	Nominated
13th Asian Film Awards	Best Supporting Actress	Kara Wai	Won
2nd Kongest Film Awards	Best Actor	Ben Yuen	Nominated
2nd Kongest Film Awards	Best Actress	Kara Wai	Nominated
2nd Kongest Film Awards	My Favorite Hong Kong Film	Tracey	Nominated
