= The Circle (2014 film) =

The Circle (Der Kreis)
- Directed by: Stefan Haupt
- Written by: Stefan Haupt, Christian Felix, Ivan Madeo, Urs Frey
- Produced by: Ivan Madeo, Urs Frey
- Starring: Matthias Hungerbühler; Sven Schelker; Marianne Sägebrecht; Anatole Taubman; Antoine Monot, Jr.
- Cinematography: Tobias Dengler
- Edited by: Christoph Menzi
- Music by: Federico Bettini
- Release date: February 2014 (Berlin)
- Running time: 102 minutes
- Country: Switzerland
- Language: Swiss German

The Circle (German: Der Kreis) is a 2014 Swiss docudrama film. Written and directed by Stefan Haupt, the film concerns the social network of gay men that developed in Zürich in the 1940s and 1950s, centered on The Circle, a gay publication, and the social events it sponsored. As the police investigate three murders of gay men by rent boys, they scapegoat The Circle and its subscribers for making Zürich an international center of gay tourism.

The film focuses on the story of Ernst Ostertag and Röbi Rapp, a schoolteacher and a drag entertainer, who met through their participation in the publication inner circle and began a lifelong romantic relationship. Interviews with them and other survivors and experts on the era are interspersed with documentary film and photographs as well as a scripted dramatic enactment of the story. The lack of legal proscription against homosexuals and Zürich's growing notoriety provide the context for the growth of a publication that overtly catered to a gay readership while avoiding explicit materials, both in prose and illustrations, in order to meet the standards of Swiss censorship.

The couple are portrayed by Matthias Hungerbühler and Sven Schelker, with documentary interviews with the real Ostertag and Rapp.

The Circle was selected as the Swiss entry for the Best Foreign Language Film at the 87th Academy Awards, but was not nominated.

== Cast ==
- Matthias Hungerbühler - Ernst Ostertag
- Sven Schelker - Röbi Rapp
- Anatole Taubman - Felix
- Peter Jecklin - Principal Dr. Max Sieber
- Marianne Sägebrecht - Erika
- Antoine Monot, Jr. - Gian
- Marie Leuenberger - Gabi Gerster
- Stefan Witschi - Rolf

== Release ==
The film was premiered at the 2014 Berlin Film Festival in Panorama section.

== Reception ==
=== Critical response ===
The Circle has an approval rating of 100% on review aggregator website Rotten Tomatoes, based on 23 reviews, and an average rating of 6.8/10. Metacritic assigned the film a weighted average score of 67 out of 100, based on 9 critics, indicating "generally favourable reviews".

=== Awards and nominations ===
The film won the Teddy Award for Best Documentary at the 2014 Berlin Film Festival, as well as the Panorama Audience Award. North American distribution rights were subsequently acquired by Wolfe Video. It was selected as the Swiss entry for the Best Foreign Language Film at the 87th Academy Awards, but was not nominated. Director Stefan Haupt said "it's an honour to represent Switzerland".

== See also ==
- LGBT history in Switzerland
- List of submissions to the 87th Academy Awards for Best Foreign Language Film
- List of Swiss submissions for the Academy Award for Best Foreign Language Film
