= Missing (2008 film) =

2008 Hong Kong film by Tsui Hark

- Theatrical release poster
- Chinese: 深海尋人
- Directed by: Tsui Hark
- Screenplay by: Tsui Hark; Lau Ho-leung
- Story by: Kwak Jae-yong; Tsui Hark
- Produced by: Peter Ho-Sun Chan; Sanping Han; Eric Huen; Hiu-Ping Lee; Kim Wah Lou; Nansun Shi; Hark Tsui; Chang-tian Wang; Raymond Bak-Ming Wong; Chi Ming Wu; Chi Wai Yan; Zhao Zhang
- Starring: Angelica Lee
- Cinematography: Yoshitaka Sakamoto
- Edited by: Yau Chi Wai
- Music by: Ricky Ho
- Production companies: Mandarin Films Distribution; China Film Group; Dong Tian Motion Picture Investment; Enlight Pictures; Applause Pictures; Film Workshop
- Distributed by: Mandarin Films Distribution
- Release date: 12 June 2008; (Hong Kong)
- Running time: 118 minutes
- Country: Hong Kong
- Languages: Cantonese; Mandarin

Missing (Chinese: 深海尋人; pinyin: Sam hoi tsam yan) is a 2008 Hong Kong dramatic fantasy horror film directed by Tsui Hark starring Angelica Lee.

== Plot ==
Psychiatrist Dr. Gao Jing is scuba diving with a group of environmentalists attempting to bury carbon dioxide in the seabed when she is photographed by Guo Dong, the brother of her patient Xiao Kai. The photographs are shown in an exhibition and the two begin dating. Guo Dong takes Gao Jing to the Ryukyu Islands to show her the ancient underwater city of Yonaguni where he has hidden a ring that he will use to propose to his true love, but is beheaded in a mysterious accident.

Xiao Kai does not believe that the body at the funeral is her brother's because there is no head and the fingerprints have worn off. She believes that her brother may still be alive and begins searching for him. She searches a shipwreck site with Guo Dong's friend Haiya Amu and finds a white-haired severed head that she believes to be her brother's.

Dr. Gao has lost her memory of the events and does not know what happened to her boyfriend. Dr. Gao convinces her boss Dr. Tang to give her hypnotism therapy and drugs to recover her memory. The drugs cause her to develop a sensitivity to bright lights and loud noises. She notices the same sensitivity in her patient Simon, who says he has seen the dripping wet ghost of Guo Dong. Dr. Gao asks Simon to help her contact Guo Dong but warns her that she is being pursued by the white-haired ghost.

Dr. Gao returns home to finds Xiao Kai speaking with a different accent and suspects that she is channeling the ghost of Su Zhenjing, a 24-year-old girl from Hualien. Xiao Kai asks Dr. Gao to open the canister containing the recovered head but Simon calls and warns her not to do it. Later he is severely injured when he is run over by Xiao Kai and ends up in the hospital.

Dr. Gao sends Haiya Amu to check whose head is in the canister but when she returns home she finds him dead with a knife in his back. Dr. Gao throws the severed head off her balcony and is attacked by Xiao Kai, who is stopped by the police. Dr. Gao takes more of the drugs to communicate with the ghost of Guo Dong, who saves her when she almost falls down the stairs. Guo Dong's ghost explains that his oxygen tank was smashed by currents and Dr. Gao invites him to stay with her. Dr. Gao returns Haiya Amu's head to her father and has a final conversation with Guo Dong.

Dr. Gao wakes up in a hospital, where she has been ever since her boyfriend's disappearance. She has no memory of the disappearance. Xiao Kai recounts how Guo Dong disappeared after saving Dr. Gao from nitrogen narcosis. A camcorder video reveals that Dr. Gao stabbed Guo Dong during her narcosis. Xiao Kai brings Dr. Gao home and cares for her. Dr. Gao dreams that Guo Done asks her to travel to Feng Lai to find him. Dr. Gao finds the tape but the stabbing has been erased. Dr. Gao travels to Feng Lai and finds Guo Dong's cabin and lost photographs. On the beach she finds the ring he meant to give her, then she walks into the ocean. In the final scene the ghosts of Gao Jin and Guo Dong are shown swimming together around the underwater city of Yonaguni.

== Cast ==
- Angelica Lee as Dr. Gao Jing
- Isabella Leong as Chen Xiao Kai
- Chang Chen as Simon
- Xiaodong Guo as Dave Chen Guo Dong
- Tony Leung Ka-fai as Dr. Edward Tong
- Chang Chen-Yue as Haiya Amu
- Alice Lee as Bookstore Keeper
- Julie Yip as Aida
- Cheng Ngai-Pong as Funeral Parlor Staff
- Poon Cheuk Ming as Old Funeral Parlor Staff
- Woo Yuk-Bing as Uncle Chen
- Lau Koon-Hung as Uncle Chen's Colleague
- Lai Kin-Fat as Noodle Ghost
- Hung Chi-Shun as Noodle Restaurant Owner
- Fai Tam Kam Vico as Noodle Restaurant Staff
- Wang Te Sheng as Ship Owner
- Pang Mei-Sheung as Nurse Leader
- Jill Jiang as Jo Jo
- Cindy Ho as Woman Using Phone
- Baby Lau as Starring Woman
- Hoffman Cheng as White Collar Man A
- Cheung Tsan-Sang as White Collar Man B
- Yu Kam-Ghu as Old Lady Ghost
- Kan Wan-To as Bald Ghost
- Ray Law as Thin Ghost
- Lee Tsung-Sheng as Police Ghost
- Chow Chi Keung as CID
- Lee Kar Fai as Security A
- Lee Long-Ming as Security B
- Ling Tse Yu as Su Zhen Jing
- Tim Mak Wai as Renovation Worker Wah
- Kao Chen-Peng as Su Jian Cheng
- Chau Zing as Renovation Worker Bon

== Production ==
Underwater photography was used in order to film underwater scenes off Yonaguni Island, Japan.

== Release and promotion ==
The film was released in Hong Kong on 12 June 2008 and featured at the 2008 Rome Film Festival.

== Reception ==
The film received generally negative reviews. Derek Elley of Variety.com called it "Tsui's career nadir" and The Hollywood Reporter called it "quite a messy piece of work" and a "hodge-podge of genres", concluding that "the whole thing looks quickly shot and put together, from the unexceptional underwater scenes to an oft-repeated theme song about undying love." A review on the website Screen Anarchy states that "the idea is intriguing" but that the film has "too many ingredients." Ho Yi of the Taipei Times wrote that "though the effort involved is commendable, the results are not".
