= Röbi Rapp =

Swiss actor

- Born: 27 May 1930; Zürich, Switzerland
- Died: 26 August 2018 (aged 88)
- Spouse: Ernst Ostertag

Röbi Rapp (27 May 1930 – 26 August 2018) was a Swiss actor influential in the European LGBT social movement. He was a female impersonator and cabaret star as well as a member of Der Kreis (The Circle).

== Biography ==
Rapp was born in Zürich. At a young age he became a Swiss child actor, including starring in the lead role in the 1941 film Das Menschlein Matthias.

As an adult, Rapp performed as a female impersonator and was a personal friend of Karl Meier. Rapp worked as a hairdresser and later was a teacher at the hairdressing school of Jonny Fahrny.

In 2003, Rapp and his longtime partner Ernst Ostertag became the first gay men to register a domestic partnership in Switzerland. They first met at the Barfüsser-Bar in 1956. Rapp came out officially to friends and family, alongside his partner, at their joint 70th birthday party in 2000.

In 2018, Rapp chose to end his life by assisted suicide after a battle with kidney disease.

== In popular culture ==
Rapp was depicted as a central character in the 2014 film The Circle, in which he is played by Sven Schelker and appears in documentary footage. The film won four Swiss film prizes and was a candidate for an Oscar nomination.
