= Byron Pang =

Hong Kong actor

- Born: 2 October 1981 (age 44); Hong Kong
- Occupation: Actor
- Years active: 2005–present
- Height: 168 cm (5 ft 6 in)

Byron Pang Koon-kei (Chinese: 彭冠期) is a Hong Kong actor and former model of Jiexi, Guangdong Hakka descent. He first appeared as a runner-up contestant for Mr. Hong Kong in 2005. His appearances include the leading role in the 2010 film Amphetamine (as 'Kafka'), in The Storm Warriors (as 'Sky'), and in publicity photographs connected to the film Permanent Residence. He has also appeared in a range of television drama series, all of which appeared on the Hong Kong TV network TVB Jade, as he had signed an exclusive contract with the network. He is now no longer with TVB, and works freelance. In 2013, he appeared as Yuan in the acclaimed Hong Kong movie Voyage, set across Europe and Asia, and filmed in the English language.

Pang attracted great interest in Hong Kong newspapers for his performance in Amphetamine, in which he co-starred with Thomas Price. Pang appeared on top of a Hong Kong building in front of press photographers for an early morning filming session. After removing all his clothing and underwear, Pang was fitted with a pair of large feathered 'wings', and his naked body was completely covered in a mixture of calligraphy and silver paint, and filmed for the opening scene and title sequence of the movie. The shower scene between Pang and Thomas Price broke new ground in Hong Kong cinema in showing prolonged full-frontal nudity.

== Filmography ==
=== Film ===
- Voyage (2013) as Yuan
- Rock On (2010) as Tiger
- Amphetamine (2010) as Kafka
- The Storm Warriors (2009) as Sky

=== Television appearances ===
==== Drama ====
- On the First Beat (2007)
- Men Don't Cry (2007)
- Men in Pain (2006)
- The Academy (2005)

==== Variety ====
- Mr. Hong Kong 2005
