= Amphetamine (film) =

2010 Hong Kong film by Scud

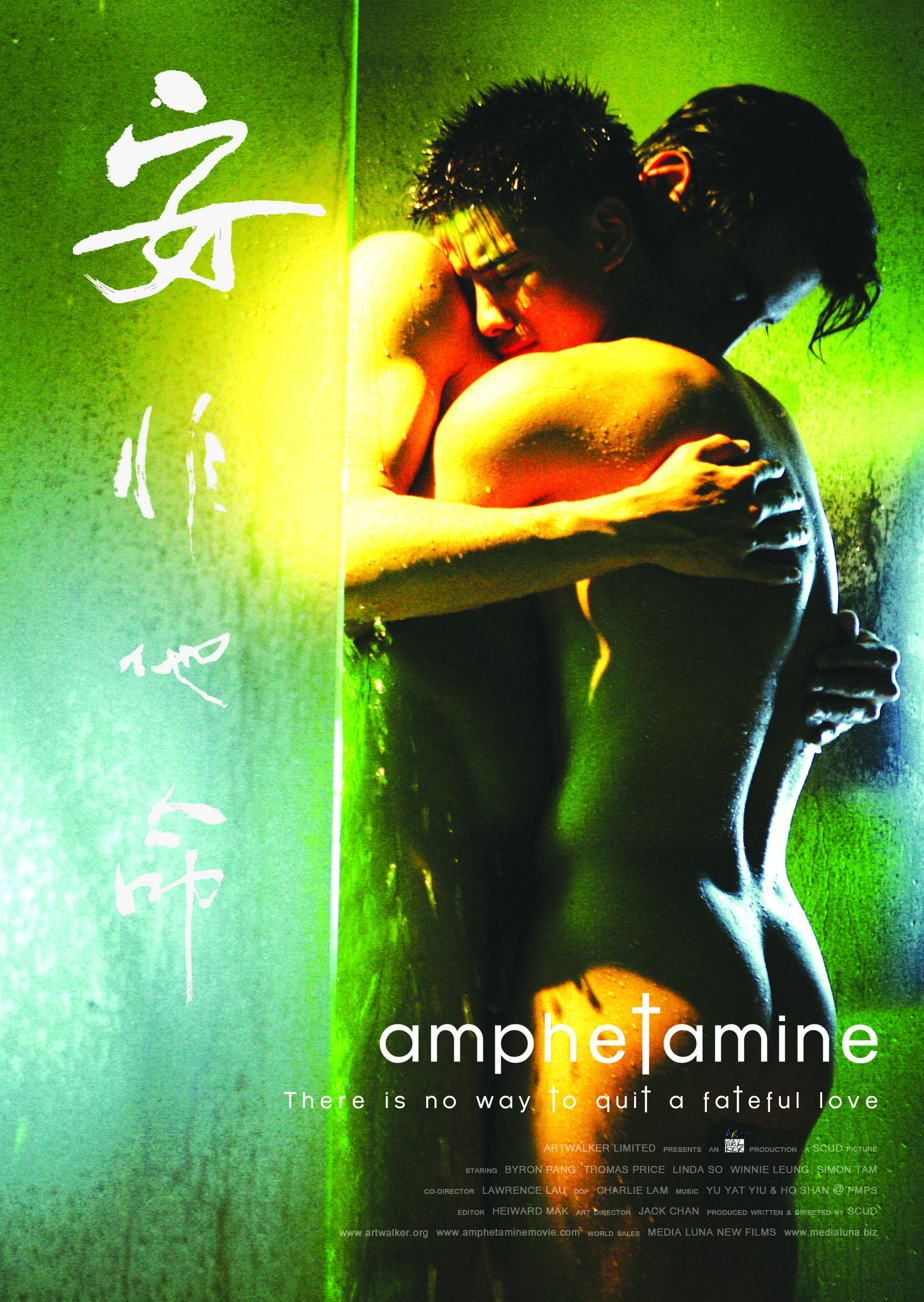
- Film poster
- Directed by: Scud
- Written by: Scud
- Produced by: Scud
- Starring: Byron Pang; Thomas Price; Linda So; Winnie Leung
- Cinematography: Charlie Lam
- Edited by: Heiward Mak
- Music by: Shan Ho; Yu Yat-Yiu
- Production company: ArtWalker Productions
- Distributed by: Golden Scene
- Release dates: 15 February 2010 (BIFF); 8 April 2010 (Hong Kong)
- Running time: 97 minutes
- Country: Hong Kong
- Languages: Cantonese; English

Amphetamine (Chinese: 安非他命; Jyutping: on1 fei1 taa1 ming6) is a 2010 Hong Kong film starring Byron Pang and Thomas Price. It revolves around the story of an ethnic Chinese fitness trainer, Kafka, who meets and falls for Daniel, a business executive. The film is directed by acclaimed Hong Kong Chinese filmmaker Scud, the production-crediting name of Danny Cheng Wan-Cheung. It was nominated for a Teddy Award at the 60th Berlin International Film Festival. The film explores several themes traditionally regarded as "taboo" in Hong Kong society in an unusually open, convention-defying way, and features full-frontal male nudity in several scenes.

== Plot ==
Set after the 2008 financial crisis, the story follows Kafka, a swimming instructor, when he meets Daniel, a wealthy investment banker who changes his life. Daniel is openly gay, and Kafka is straight. They fall in love, despite their different sexualities and Kafka's strong Catholic faith which conflicts with this relationship.

Their relationship is further complicated by Kafka's erratic behaviour and amphetamine addiction. Another roadblock in their relationship is Kafka's reluctance to consummate their relationship, which can be attributed to him having been violently gang-raped by a group of men then sodomised with a wooden stick and left for dead. Kafka was attacked for rescuing a woman who was the gang's original target. Fortunately, she left and got help so he physically survived the traumatic experience.

Inevitably, Kafka is arrested for possession with intent to distribute, even though he was only caught with .03 grams of ice. Daniel was also detained with Kafka but was released after they learned of his dual Australian citizenship. He retains an attorney for Kafka and after an unspecified time, he is released. Upon his release, he is informed of the death of his mother, whose funeral has already taken place. He visits his drug dealer brother and Kafka relapses and does ice with him. He goes into a tailspin and rapes Daniel's ex-girlfriend/best friend, Linda, while he is extremely high. Afterwards, he locks himself in the bathroom and floods Daniel's apartment. Linda says she forgives Kafka and begs Daniel to forgive him as well. While consoling Linda, she and Daniel end up having sex on the living room floor and Kafka sees them.

The next morning, Daniel asks to do amphetamine with Kafka who maintains that despite all of his shortcomings, he still loves Daniel. Daniel affirms their relationship by asking Kafka to return to Australia with him, where they can get married but Kafka asks for more time.

At Daniel's going away party, Kafka is stripped and painted with silver body paint and calligraphy, and given a pair of white angel wings to wear (an image which is seen at the beginning of the film). The next morning Kafka gets high and jumps off the rooftop of the apartment, believing he is a fallen angel. Although Kafka survives, he is unconscious and hospitalised.

When he wakes up and does not see Daniel, Kafka escapes from the hospital and looks for him on the bridge where they bungee jumped on their first date. Distraught and hallucinating from detox, he jumps off the bridge into the frozen water and dies, his final thoughts being those of him and Daniel swimming together in each other's arms.

== Cast ==
- Byron Pang as Kafka
- Tom Price as Daniel
- Linda So as May
- Winnie Leung as Linda

== Controversy ==
The level III-rated film met controversy in Hong Kong when the Television and Entertainment Licensing Authority asked for several shots of anal intercourse to be cut before public screening. As the whole film had been allowed to screen as the closing film of the 34th Hong Kong International Film Festival, Scud protested against the authority's decision and complained to the Chief Executive Donald Tsang. The shots in concern were finally blackened-out but with sound in public screening as a protest by Scud.

== Critical reception ==
In a mixed review for The Hollywood Reporter, film critic Maggie Lee wrote positively of Amphetamine as compared to Scud's previous films, and praised the cinematography and art direction, as well as the performances of the two lead actors, while criticizing the lack of consistent tone and Scud's handling of the film's more "substantial" themes.

== Home media ==
The uncut version was internationally released on a Panorama (HK) VCD, DVD and on Blu-ray disc on 24 September 2010.

== Films by the same director ==
Name of film	Year released
City Without Baseball	2008
Permanent Residence	2009
Love Actually... Sucks!	2011
Voyage	2013
Utopians	2015
Thirty Years of Adonis	2017
Apostles	2022
Bodyshop	2023
Naked Nations: Hong Kong Tribe	2024
Ghosts Just Wanna Have Fun	2024

== See also ==
- Hong Kong films of 2010
- List of lesbian, gay, bisexual or transgender-related films
- List of lesbian, gay, bisexual, or transgender-related films by storyline
- Nudity in film (East Asian cinema since 1929)
