= Permanent Residence =

2009 Hong Kong film by Scud

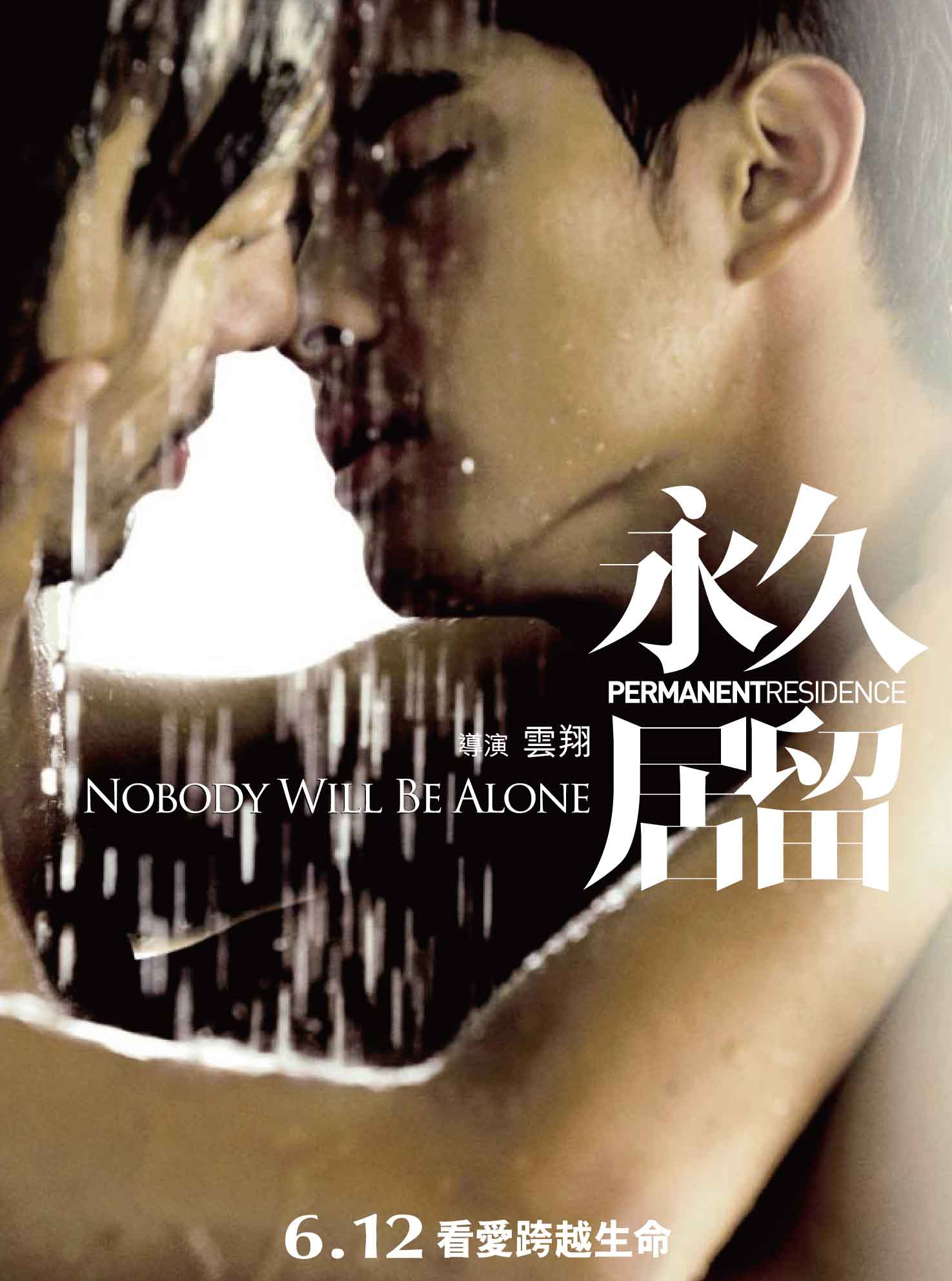
- Theatrical release poster
- Directed by: Scud
- Written by: Scud
- Produced by: Scud
- Starring: Sean Li; Osman Hung; Jackie Chow Tak-Bong; Lau Yu-Hong; Eva Lo
- Cinematography: Herman Yau
- Edited by: Leung Kwok-Wing (as Jacky Leung)
- Music by: Teddy Robin Kwan
- Production company: ArtWalker Productions
- Distributed by: Golden Scene
- Release date: 23 April 2009 (Hong Kong)
- Running time: 115 minutes
- Country: Hong Kong
- Languages: Cantonese; English

Permanent Residence (Chinese: 永久居留) is a 2009 Hong Kong film starring Sean Li and Osman Hung. It was directed by Hong Kong filmmaker Danny Cheng, also known as Scud. The film explores several themes traditionally regarded as "taboo" in Hong Kong society, in an unusually open, convention-defying way, and features full-frontal male nudity in several scenes.

== Plot ==
The film explores the near true-life story of a young Chinese man (said to be a semi-autobiography of the film's director), who seeks a long-term relationship with a straight friend. The friend is aware of his inclination, and is happy to befriend him, but is very reluctant to express open affection for him or to become emotionally involved.

== Production ==
Permanent Residence examines the limit of life, and is the first of a trilogy: the second, called Amphetamine, examines the limits of passion, while the third, known as Life of an Artist, examines the limits of art. Amphetamine was screened at the Berlin International Film Festival on 15 February 2010, and was also shown at the Hong Kong International Film Festival on 6 April 2010. The third film, Life of an Artist, has not yet been released.

In the album book that accompanies the film, the director Scud appears naked as he replaces Sean Li in the photos in an attempt to emphasize the semi-autobiographical nature of the film. Publicity videos accompanying the film also feature the full-frontal nudity of famous Hong Kong model Byron Pang, who was a contestant in the Mr. Hong Kong 2005 contest, as well as the film's director himself. The film was said by critics to be both insightful and mournful as it reflects on the fleeting nature of love and mortality.

== Cast ==
- Osman Hung as Windson
- Sean Li as Ivan
- Jackie Chow Tak Bong as Josh Aviv
- Lau Yu Hong as Nam
- Eva Lo as Eva

== Home media ==
A Panorama Distribution (HK) edition of this film was released internationally on DVD on 5 October 2009 and on Blu-ray disc on 4 August 2011. A US Blu-ray edition was released on 3 May 2011.

== See also ==
- Hong Kong films of 2009
- List of lesbian, gay, bisexual or transgender-related films
