= Love Actually... Sucks! =

2011 Hong Kong film by Scud

- Theatrical release poster
- Directed by: Scud
- Written by: Scud
- Produced by: Scud
- Starring: Osman Hung; Linda So; Haze Leung; John Tai; Tang Wei
- Cinematography: Herman Yau
- Edited by: William Chang Suk Ping; Andy Chan Chi Wai
- Music by: Yu Yat-Yiu @ PMPS
- Production company: ArtWalker Productions
- Distributed by: Golden Scene
- Release date: 7 July 2011 (QFEST)
- Running time: 83 minutes
- Country: Hong Kong
- Languages: Cantonese; English

Love Actually... Sucks! (Chinese: 愛很爛) is a 2011 Hong Kong film directed by Scud (the stage name of Danny Cheng Wan-Cheung). The film's title is a humorous wordplay on the 2003 romantic comedy film Love Actually, as it deals with similar complicated and interconnected relationships. It was released at the 47th Chicago International Film Festival, in October 2011. The film explores several themes traditionally regarded as "taboo" in Hong Kong society, in an unusually open, convention-defying way, featuring frequent full-frontal male and female nudity.

== Plot ==
Love Actually... Sucks! was inspired by real-life events, and opens with a dramatic wedding feast. It tells a variety of stories about love that has gone wrong: a brother and sister in an illicit relationship, a married painter who falls in love with his young male life model, a dance school teacher who becomes involved with his senior student, a role-playing lesbian couple, and a complex love triangle. The film celebrates the belief that life is love.

== Cast ==
- Osman Hung as Spider
- Linda So as Moon
- Haze Leung as Policeman
- John Tai as Painter
- Tang Wei as Model
- Calvin Wong as Boy in sauna
- Owen Lee as Dance teacher
- Alice Chen as Queen
- Betty Chan as Dance teacher's girl
- Christepher Wee as Brother
- Sherry Li as Sister
- Lareine Xu as Policewoman
- Celia Chang as Policewoman's girl
- Jackie Chow as Bridegroom
- Winnie Leung as Bride
- Ryo van Kooten as Bridesman

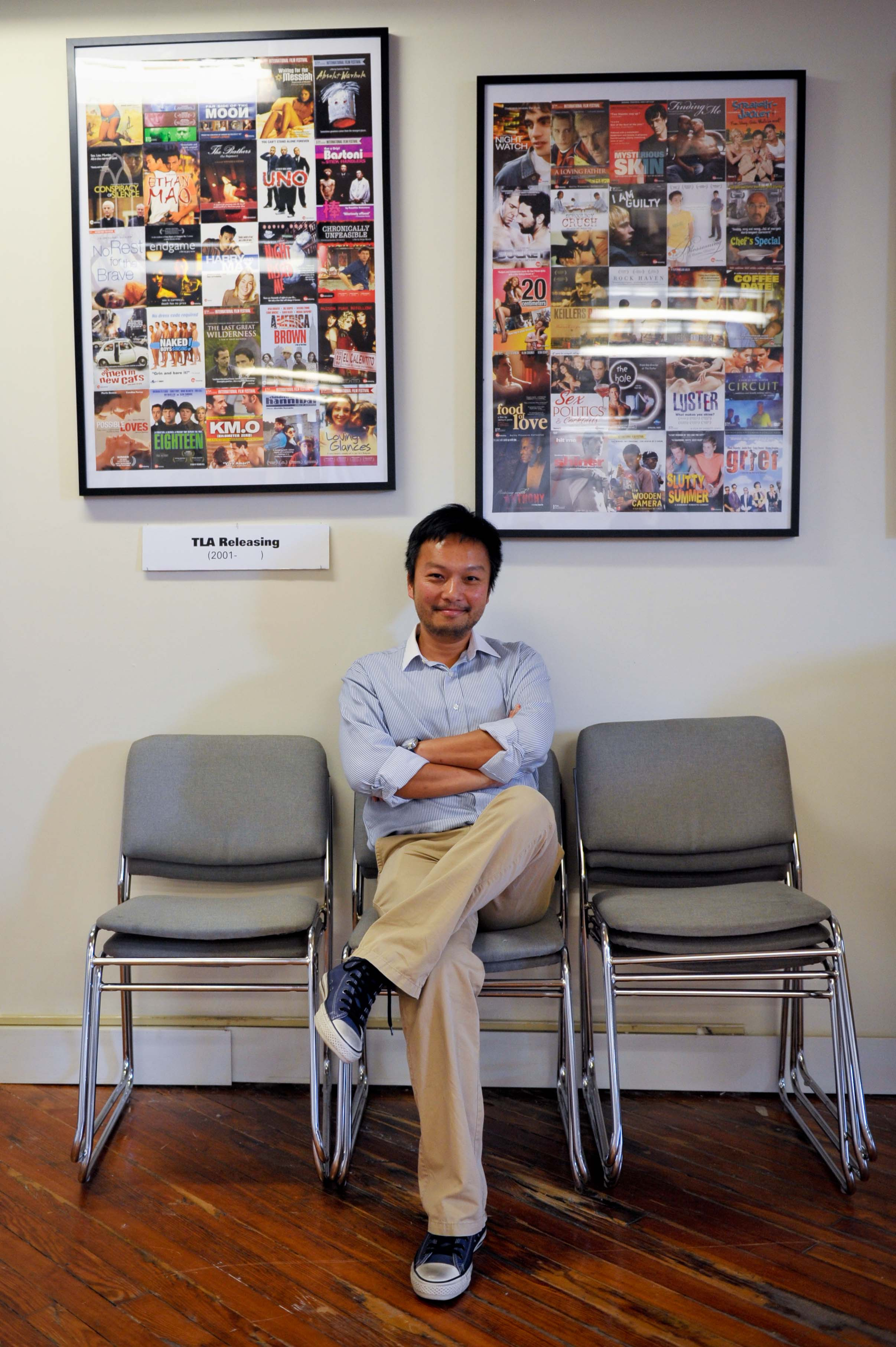
Scud at QFest.

== Production ==
A memorable scene in the movie shows a woman performing oral sex on her boyfriend. Scud confirmed the act was unsimulated. "Linda So was at first concerned if she was going to be able to do it. The scene took five takes to film, and Haze Leung quipped, 'One more take and I would have come.' When we were done, Linda and Haze collapsed in laughter. They are real professionals," Scud said.

== Home media ==
A Panorama Distribution edition of Love Actually... Sucks! was released internationally on VCD, DVD and Blu-ray disc on 26 June 2012.

== See also ==
- Hong Kong films of 2011
- List of lesbian, gay, bisexual or transgender-related films
- List of lesbian, gay, bisexual, or transgender-related films by storyline
- Nudity in film (East Asian cinema since 1929)
