= Scud (filmmaker) =

Hong Kong film producer

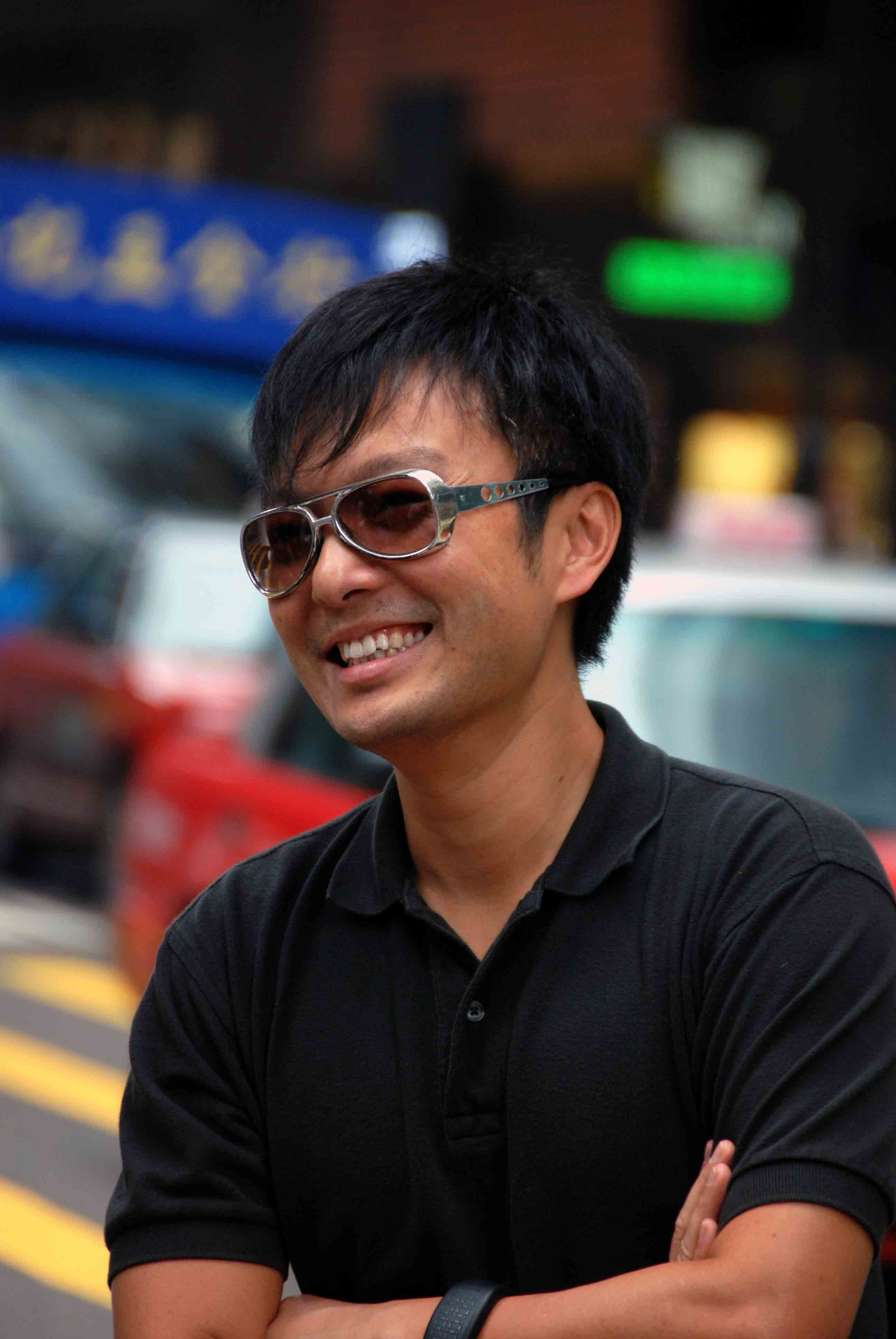
- Scud in 2008
- Born: Danny Cheng Wan-Cheung; March 20, 1967 (age 59); Guangzhou, China
- Education: Open University of Hong Kong
- Occupation: Filmmaker
- Years active: 2000s–present
- Awards: Taiwan Film Critics Society Awards – Winner in Top 10 Best Chinese Films: City Without Baseball (2008) Hong Kong Film Critics Society Awards – Film of Merit: City Without Baseball (2008) Hong Kong Film Critics Society Awards – Winner in Top 7 Suggested Films: City Without Baseball (2008) Berlin International Film Festival – Teddy Award Nomination: Amphetamine (2010)

Chinese name
- Traditional Chinese: 雲翔
- Simplified Chinese: 云翔
Transcriptions

Danny Cheng Wan-Cheung (Chinese: 雲翔; born 20 March 1967), known professionally as Scud, is a China-born Hong Kong filmmaker. He says that he chose the name "Scud" to match his Chinese name, which translates in English as "Scudding Clouds". His films explore taboo themes within Hong Kong cinema, including same-sex relationships and drug-taking. His filmmaking style eschews cynicism or gritty realism, and embraces an acceptance of the life choices made by his characters, rather than a search for "solutions". Scud has cited Pier Paolo Pasolini, Yukio Mishima, Pedro Almodovar and Peter Greenaway as directors who have influenced his work.

== Life and career ==
Scud was raised by his grandmother in China before he moved to Hong Kong at the age of 13. After a 20-year career in IT, he founded a publicly listed company and acquired a bachelor's degree through part-time study at the Open University of Hong Kong. He moved to Australia in 2001 for permanent residence.

In 2005, he returned to Hong Kong to start a film production company, Artwalker. He wrote and produced City Without Baseball (2008), then became a film director with Permanent Residence (2009), which he said was a semi-autobiographical account of his own life, with many scenes and locations providing a faithful account of it. This was followed by Amphetamine (2010). Scud released his fourth film, Love Actually... Sucks!, in 2011, while his fifth, Voyage (2013), was the first of his stories to be filmed almost entirely in English. He released a sixth film entitled Utopians in 2015, as well as a seventh, Thirty Years of Adonis, in 2017.

In May 2022, Scud told Variety that he planned to retire from filmmaking and leave Hong Kong (due to the worsening market for independent films and censorship) after finishing four films: Apostles, Bodyshop, Naked Nations: Hong Kong Tribe and Ghosts Just Wanna Have Fun.

== Filmography ==
Film name (English)	Film name (Chinese)	Year released
City Without Baseball	無野之城	2008
Permanent Residence	永久居留	2009
Amphetamine	安非他命	2010
Love Actually... Sucks!	愛很爛	2011
Voyage	遊	2013
Utopians	同流合烏	2015
Thirty Years of Adonis	三十儿立	2017
Apostles	十三門徒	2022
Bodyshop	屍房菜	2023
Naked Nations: Hong Kong Tribe	裸族之香港部落	2024
Ghosts Just Wanna Have Fun	幹鬼屁事	2024

== Awards ==
City Without Baseball

- 2008 Hong Kong Film Critics Society Awards – Film of Merit Award
- 2008 Hong Kong Film Critics Society Awards – Winner in Top 7 Suggested Films
- 2008 Taiwan Film Critics Society Awards – Winner in Top 10 Best Chinese Films

Permanent Residence

- 10th Chinese Film Media Awards – Best New Actor
- 33rd Hong Kong International Film Festival – Official Selection
- 20th Hong Kong Gay and Lesbian Film Festival – Official Selection (Director's Cut)
- 10th Taipei Film Festival – Special Reserved Screening (Director's Cut)
- 25th Torino GLBT Film Festival – Official Selection

Amphetamine

- 2010 Teddy Award Nomination at the Berlin International Film Festival of 2010.
- 24th Teddy Award – Runner Up
- 34th Hong Kong International Film Festival – Closing Film
- 25th Torino GLBT Film Festival – Competition
- 46th Chicago International Film Festival – Official Selection
- 12th Rio International Film Festival – Official Selection
- 30th Hawaii International Film Festival – Official Selection
- 30th Hong Kong Film Awards – Best New Actor Nomination

Love Actually... Sucks!

- 47th Chicago International Film Festival – Official Selection
- Philadelphia Q-Fest 2011 – Official Selection

Voyage

- 49th Chicago International Film Festival – Official Selection
- 1st Q Hugo Award
- 37th São Paulo International Film Festival – Official Selection
- Kyoto International Film and Art Festival 2015 – Special Invitation

Utopians

- 2nd New Director Film Festival – Official Selection & Best Foreign Film Director
- 27th Palm Springs International Film Festival – Official Selection
- 13th Outfest Fusion LGBT People of Color Film Festival – Official Selection
- 31st Torino Gay & Lesbian Film Festival – Official Selection
- 27th Hong Kong Lesbian & Gay Film Festival – Official Selection
- 52nd Chicago International Film Festival – Official Selection
- 6th Fringe! Queer Film& Arts fest – Official Selection

== See also ==
- Cinema of Hong Kong
