= Utopians (film) =

2015 Hong Kong-Taiwanese-Chinese film by Scud

- Film poster
- 同流合烏
- Directed by: Scud
- Written by: Scud
- Produced by: Scud
- Starring: Adonis He Fei; Jackie Chow; Ching-Man Chin; Fiona Wang; Jie Shui
- Cinematography: Nathan Wong
- Edited by: Matthew Hui
- Music by: Kawayama Ho
- Production company: ArtWalker Productions
- Distributed by: Muse Planning (Japan); Breaking Glass Pictures (USA)
- Release date: 31 October 2015 (New Directors Film Festival)
- Running time: 94 minutes
- Countries: Hong Kong; Taiwan; China
- Languages: Mandarin; Cantonese; English; Japanese

Utopians (Chinese: 同流合烏) is a 2015 film by the Hong Kong filmmaker Scud, the production-crediting name of Danny Cheng Wan-Cheung. It is the story of a university student who becomes deeply attracted to his male professor, and whose life changes as a result. The film received its world premiere on 31 October 2015 at the New Directors Film Festival in Japan.

== Plot ==
Utopians is a coming-of-age story about a young student, Hins Gao (Adonis He Fei), who unexpectedly finds himself deeply attracted to his male professor, Antonio Ming (Jackie Chow). Despite having had a conservative upbringing, Hins wants to get close enough to Ming to understand him. The experience transforms his life and comes to define his adult identity. The story is described as a "visually stunning paean to open love and pan-sexuality freely blending straightforward narrative and fantasy elements".

== Cast ==
- Adonis He Fei ... Hins Gao
- Jackie Chow ... Professor Antonio Ming
- Ching-Man Chin ... Swan (credited as 'Moe Chin')
- Fiona Wang ... Joey
- Jie Shui ... Mother
- Ben Fu Wai Bun... Dean
- William Lo ... Boy on boat trip / Bonfire Boy
- Jung Jen Pao ... Boy on boat trip / Bonfire Boy
- Eric Cheng ... Father
- Yeung Man Lok ... Baby Hins
- Gavin Philip Che
- Flora Cheung
- William Tang
- He Wong
- Vinci Wong
- Yin-chi Wong

== Production ==
Utopians explores several themes traditionally regarded as "taboo" in Hong Kong society and features full-frontal male nudity in several scenes.

The uncut version of Utopians includes a scene in which the main character, played by mainland China actor Adonis He Fei, is shown completely naked stroking his erect penis as he sighs with pleasure until he ejaculates.

The film's director, Scud, says that he drew inspiration for the film from the writings of Plato and the culture of Ancient Greece, which he describes as the "best era of mankind" when being gay was mainstream. On the film's themes, Scud stated that "the dream of a utopian life" is one where education "serves to enhance love instead of forbid it", and that this became clear to him ever since he was aware of the sexual alternatives available.

Scud says that he fell into depression after making his fifth film, Voyage, and was considering ending his career. But one day a 19-year-old boy came to him and talked about his story of having fallen in love with a policeman, and about a Japanese writer whose work Scud had read extensively when he was younger. After this, he felt his next film should pay tribute to the period of enlightenment brought about by great philosophers and artists.

According to the director, Utopians took only weeks to write and shoot. Scud also experimented with a more "democratic" method of filmmaking by consulting the cast on the roles they most preferred to take and encouraging them to resolve matters among themselves, much like conflict resolution in ancient times.

Casting was conducted openly in Hong Kong, Taiwan and Singapore, with over 300 attending in Hong Kong on a particularly stormy day. The film's leading man, Adonis He Fei, is an actor from mainland China. His agent provided a résumé so that he could fit Utopians into his busy filming schedule.

== Languages ==
In the movie four languages are spoken: Mandarin, Cantonese, Japanese and English. Even though much of the film is centered around Hong Kong, the main characters speak Mandarin-Chinese among each other, e.g. Hins, his mother, his girlfriend and Ming. The other languages are spoken in much shorter segments. This multitude of languages is also reflected in the transcription of the Chinese characters of the title (Chinese: 同流合烏) given by the producer, which is Cantonese and reads tung lau hap woo, whereas one would expect a transcription in Mandarin pinyin for such a mostly Mandarin spoken movie, which would be tóng liú hé wū.

== See also ==
- List of Hong Kong films of 2015
- List of lesbian, gay, bisexual or transgender-related films
- List of lesbian, gay, bisexual, or transgender-related films by storyline
- Nudity in film (East Asian cinema since 1929)
