= Thirty Years of Adonis =

2017 Hong Kong-Taiwanese-Chinese film by Scud

- Film poster
- 三十儿立
- Directed by: Scud
- Written by: Scud
- Produced by: Scud
- Starring: Adonis He Fei; Susan Shaw; Nora Miao; Amanda Lee; Bank Chuang
- Cinematography: Nathan Wong
- Edited by: Chan Chui-Hing
- Music by: Shan Ho
- Release date: 15 September 2017
- Running time: 97 minutes
- Countries: Hong Kong; Taiwan; China
- Languages: Hokkien; Mandarin; Cantonese; English

Thirty Years of Adonis (Chinese: 三十儿立), is a 2017 film by the Hong Kong filmmaker Scud, the production-crediting name of Danny Cheng Wan-Cheung. It is the story of a young man who decides to pursue acting as a Beijing Opera actor, but soon becomes a commercial sex worker for men and women. The film explores several themes traditionally regarded as "taboo" in Hong Kong society and features full-frontal male nudity in several scenes.

== Plot ==
Thirty Years of Adonis explores the philosophy of life and death, religious beliefs, and karma through an erotically charged story. Yang Ke is a 30-year-old man who dreams of becoming a famous Beijing Opera actor. He is an attractive man who can effortlessly charm both men and women. However, his fate takes a twisted turn that leads him to the underworld as he joins a cult-like society of masculine sex workers. Despite his faith and willingness to give, he remains a prisoner to his karma. Hell awaits when heaven seems near, and the ultimate truth is revealed in a heart-breaking moment from which there is no return.

== Cast ==
- Adonis He Fei as Yang Ke
- Susan Shaw
- Nora Miao
- Amanda Lee
- Bank Chuang
- Eric East
- Katashi
- Cici Lee
- Justin Lim
- Alan Tang
- Yu Sheng Ting

== Production ==
Although some of the scenes were unmistakably filmed in casinos in Macau, the streets of Hong Kong and temples in Thailand, Thirty Years of Adonis purportedly blurs geographical boundaries by portraying characters speaking different languages and practising different cultures. In addition, the background of the protagonist Ke—born in Shandong and working in a Beijing Opera troupe—further confers a sense of universality upon the social issues the film touches on.

== Languages ==
In the movie, four languages are spoken: Hokkien, Mandarin, Cantonese and English.

== See also ==
- List of Hong Kong films of 2017
- List of lesbian, gay, bisexual or transgender-related films
- List of lesbian, gay, bisexual, or transgender-related films by storyline
- Nudity in film (East Asian cinema since 1929)
