= List of LGBTQ-related films of 2010 =

This is a list of lesbian, gay, bisexual, transgender or queer-related films released in 2010. It contains theatrically released films that deal with important gay, lesbian, bisexual, transgender or queer characters or issues and may have same-sex romance or relationships as a plot device.

== Films ==
Title	Director	Country	Genre	Cast	Notes
2 Frogs in the West	Dany Papineau	Canada	Comedy, drama	Mirianne Brule, Dany Papineau, Jessica Malka	
8: The Mormon Proposition	Redd Cowan, Steven Greenstreet	United States	Documentary	Dustin Lance Black (Narrator), interviews with; Spencer Jones, Tyler Barrick, Linda Williams Stay, Kate Kendell, David Melson, Dennis Herrera, Fred Karger, Carol Lynn Pearson, Gavin Newsom, Mike Nelson, Chip White, George Cole and Rocky Anderson	About the Mormon Church's support of Proposition 8
108 Cuchillo de Palo	Renate Costa	Spain, Paraguay	Documentary		
The Affair (Muli)	Adolfo Alix Jr.	Philippines	Drama, romance	Cogie Domingo, Sid Lucero	
All About Love	Ann Hui	Hong Kong	Drama	Sandra Ng, Vivian Chow, Cheung Siu-fai, William Chan, Joey Meng, Queenie Chu, Fan Yik-Man, Fung Bo Bo, Raven Hanson, Serina Ha, Jo Kuk, Abe Kwong, Eman Lam, Rick Lau, Tina Lau, Jayson Li	
Amphetamine	Scud	Hong Kong	Drama	Byron Pang, Tom Price, Linda So and Winnie Leung	
L'Amour fou	Pierre Thoretton	France	Documentary	About Yves Saint-Laurent and his lover Pierre Bergé, features interviews; Betty Catroux, Loulou de la Falaise and archive footage of Frédéric Chambre, Boujemaa Lahbali, Catherine Deneuve, Laetitia Casta, François de Ricqlès, François Curiel and Lionel Gosset	
Anderson's Cross	Jerome Elston Scott	United States	Comedy, drama	Michael Warren, Joanna Cassidy, Joyce Guy, Jerome Elston Scott, Nicholas Downs, Heather Bergdahl, Bill Moseley, Micah Stuart, Art Evans, Ryan Carnes, Taran Killam, Alan Blumenfeld, Mary Jo Catlett, James Snyder, Jack Donner, Kimmy Robertson, Rocky Marquette, Brad Yoder	
Arekti Premer Golpo	Kaushik Ganguly	India	Drama	Rituparno Ghosh, Indraneil Sengupta, Jisshu Sengupta, Churni Ganguly, Raima Sen, Chapal Bhaduri	First film on homosexuality to be shot after the decriminalization of Section 377 of the Indian Penal Code
Bashment	Rikki Beadle-Blair	United Kingdom	Drama	Joel Dommett, Ludvig Bonin, Nathan Clough, Marcus Kai, Jennifer Daley, Arnie Hewitt, Michael Lindall	
Beautiful Darling	James Rasin	United States	Documentary	Chloë Sevigny (narrator), John Waters, Fran Lebowitz, Holly Woodlawn, Paul Morrissey	About actress Candy Darling
BearCity	Doug Langway	United States	Comedy	Joe Conti, Stephen Guarino, Brian Keane, Gregory Gunter, Sebastian La Cause, Alex Di Dio, James Martinez, Gerald McCullouch and Ashlie Atkinson	
Beginners	Mike Mills	United States	Drama	Ewan McGregor, Christopher Plummer, Mélanie Laurent, Goran Višnjić, Mary Page Keller, Kai Lennox, China Shavers	Based on the true story of writer/director Mills' father, who came out at age 75.
The Best Things in the World (As Melhores Coisas do Mundo)	Laís Bodansky	Brazil	Drama, comedy	Francisco Miguez, Gsbriela Rocha, Caio Blat	Based on the book series Mano by Gilberto Dimenstein and Heloisa Prieto
Black Swan	Darren Aronofsky	United States	Thriller	Natalie Portman, Mila Kunis, Vincent Cassel, Barbara Hershey, Winona Ryder, Benjamin Millepied, Ksenia Solo, Kristina Anapau, Janet Montgomery, Sebastian Stan, Toby Hemingway	
Black Bread	Agustí Villaronga	Spain	Drama	Francesc Colomer, Marina Comas, Nora Navas, Roger Casamajor, Laia Marull, Eduard Fernández, Sergi López	a.k.a. Pa negre; based on Emili Teixidor's novel of the same name, also containing elements of two other works written by him, Retrat d'un assassí d'ocells and Sic transit Gloria Swanson
Bloomington	Fernanda Cardoso	United States	Drama	Allison McAtee, Sarah Stouffer	
Burlesque	Steven Antin	United States	Musical, romance, drama	Cher, Christina Aguilera, Eric Dane, Cam Gigandet, Julianne Hough, Alan Cumming, Peter Gallagher, Kristen Bell, Stanley Tucci, Dianna Agron	
Cake and Sand (Torten im Sand)	Christoph Scheermann	Germany	Short, comedy, drama, romance	Jan Andreesen and Bartholomew Sammut	16 minutes long,
Cappuccino	Tamer Ruggli	Switzerland	Short, comedy, drama	Benjamin Décosterd, Manuela Biedermann and Anton Ciurlia	16 minutes long, short listed as part of the 5th edition of the IRIS Prize International Film Festival 2011,
Children of God	Kareem Mortimer	Bahamas	Drama	Johnny Ferro, Margaret Laurena Kemp, Stephen Tyrone Williams, Van Brown, Mark Richard Ford, Craig Pinder	
Communication	Christopher Banks	New Zealand	Short, drama	Rudi Vodanovich, Alexander Campbell, Richard Lambeth and Rita Lefau Ryan	20 minutes long,
Como Esquecer	Malu de Martino	Brazil	Drama	Ana Paula Arósio, Murilo Rosa, Natália Lage, Arieta Corrêa, Bianca Comparato	
Curious Thing	Alain Hain	United States	Short, drama, romance	Danny Bernardy, Matthew Wilkas, Rebecca Pappa	8 minutes long,
Dirty Girl	Abe Sylvia	United States	Comedy	Juno Temple, Milla Jovovich, William H. Macy, Mary Steenburgen, Dwight Yoakam, Jeremy Dozier, Maeve Quinlan, Tim McGraw, Nicholas D'Agosto, Elsie Fisher, Brian Baumgartner, Nate Hartley, Reiley McClendon, Jonathan Slavin, Brent Briscoe, Jack Kehler, Gary Grubbs	
Dog Pound	Kim Chapiron	Canada	Thriller	Adam Butcher, Shane Kippel, Mateo Morales, Slim Twig, Taylor Poulin, Dewshane Williams, Lawrence Bayne	Remake of the British borstal film Scum
Dunno Y... Na Jaane Kyon	Sanjay Sharma	India	Drama	Zeenat Aman, Kapil Sharma, Kabir Bedi, Hazel Crowney (credited as Hazel), Helen, Mahabanoo Mody-Kotwal, Yuvraaj Parashar, Asha Sachdev, Parikshit Sahni (credited as Parikshat Sahni), Rituparna Sengupta, Aryan Vaid	Features first gay kiss in Indian cinema between Parashar and Sharma
Easy A	Will Gluck	United States	Comedy	Emma Stone, Penn Badgley, Amanda Bynes	Partially inspired by the novel The Scarlet Letter by Nathaniel Hawthorne
Easy Money (Dinero fácil)	Carlos Montero	Spain	Short, drama, thriller	Mario Casas, Ales Furundarena and Christian Mulas	15 minutes long,
Elena Undone	Nicole Conn	United States	Drama	Necar Zadegan, Traci Dinwiddie, Gary Weeks, Sam Harris	Loosely based on Conn's relationship with Marina Rice Bader
Elvis e Madona	Marcello Laffitte	Brazil	Romance, comedy	Simone Spoladore, Igor Cotrim, Sérgio Bezerra	aka Elvis & Madonna,
Family Tree (L'Arbre et la forêt)	Olivier Ducastel, Jacques Martineau	France	Drama	Guy Marchand, Françoise Fabian, Sabrina Seyvecou, Yannick Renier, François Negret, Catherine Mouchet, Sandrine Dumas, Pierre-Loup Rajot	
Fathers & Sons	Carl Bessai	Canada	Comedy, drama	Benjamin Ratner, Jay Brazeau, Stephen Lobo	Bessai's unofficial sequel to Mothers & Daughters
A Few Days of Respite (Quelques jours de répit)	Amor Hakkar	France	Drama	Marina Vlady, Amor Hakkar, Samir Guesmi, Shimon Ben Lulu, Yves Grenard, Stéphanie Saliège, Sarah Hakkar, Kim-Kim Nezzar (credited as Kim Nezzar)	
The Four-Faced Liar	Jacob Chase	United States	Comedy, drama, romance	Marja-Lewis Ryan, Emily Peck, Todd Kubrak, Daniel Carlisle, Liz Osborn	
Fyra år till	Tova Magnusson-Norling	Sweden	Comedy	Björn Kjellman, Eric Ericson, Tova Magnusson, André Wickström, Sten Ljunggren, Inger Hayman, Iwar Wiklander, Jacob Nordenson, Richard Ulfsäter	aka Four More Years
Gigola	Laure Charpentier	France	Drama	Lou Doillon, Eduardo Noriega, Marie Kremer, Rossy de Palma, Ana Padrão, Virginie Pradal, Arly Jover, Marisa Berenson, Marisa Paredes, Thierry Lhermitte	
Go Go Reject	Michael J. Saul	United States	Short, comedy	Heath Daniels, Iva Turner, Korken Alexander, Josh Babich, Jonathan Bierner, Matthew Bridges, Steve Callahan, Jimmy Clabots, Travis Dixon,	20 minutes long, Winner of 'short film' San Diego FilmOut Audience Awards
Grown Up Movie Star	Adriana Maggs	Canada	Drama	Shawn Doyle, Tatiana Maslany, Jonny Harris	
Heartbeats (Les Amours imaginaires)	Xavier Dolan	Canada	Drama	Monia Chokri, Niels Schneider, Xavier Dolan, Anne Dorval	
Howl	Rob Epstein, Jeffrey Friedman	United States	Animation, biography, drama	James Franco, Aaron Tveit, Jon Hamm, David Strathairn, Alessandro Nivola, Mary-Louise Parker, Bob Balaban, Jeff Daniels, Jon Prescott, Treat Williams, Todd Rotondi	Depicts the trial of the poem of the same name by Allen Ginsberg while he talks about his life
I Don't Care	Harry Wootliff	United Kingdom	Short, drama	Mark Benton, Di Botcher, Paloma Faith, Helen Grady, David Leon and Iwan Rheon	Coming Up, Season 8 episode 4. As a short film included in the DVD Boys On Film 8 – Cruel Britannia from the series DVD Boys On Film
I Don't Want to Go Back Alone (Eu Não Quero Voltar Sozinho)	Daniel Ribeiro	Brazil	Short	Ghilherme Lobo, Fabio Audi and Tess Amorim	17 minutes long, later expanded into the 2014 feature-length film The Way He Looks, also written and directed by Ribeiro
I Want Your Love	Travis Mathews	United States	Short	Jesse Metzger and Brenden Gregory	14 minutes long, later made into a full-length feature film of the same name by the same director
In the Future (En el futuro)	Mauro Andrizzi	Argentina	Documentary		Winner of the Queer Lion at the 67th Venice International Film Festival
Is It Just Me?	JC Calciano	United States	Romance	Nicholas Downs, Adam Huss, David Loren, Bruce Gray, Michelle Laurent, Bob Rumnock	Winner of the 2010 Rainbow Award, in the Narrative Feature Film category, for the 2010 Honolulu Rainbow Film Festival.
Just Friends? (친구사이?)	Kim Jho Kwang-soo	South Korea	Short, romance, drama	Yeon Woo-jin, Lee Je-hoon	
Kaboom	Gregg Araki	United States	Drama	Thomas Dekker, Juno Temple, Haley Bennett, Roxane Mesquida, Brennan Mejia, James Duval	
The Kids Are All Right	Lisa Cholodenko	United States	Drama	Julianne Moore, Annette Bening, Mark Ruffalo, Mia Wasikowska, Josh Hutcherson	One of the first mainstream films to depict a same-sex couple raising two teenagers
L.A. Zombie	Bruce LaBruce	United States; Germany	Adult, horror	François Sagat, Rocco Giovanni, Wolf Hudson, Eddie Diaz, Andrew James, Matthew Rush, Erik Rhodes, Francesco D'Macho, Adam Killian	
Leading Ladies	Daniel Beahm, Erika Randall Beahm	United States	Drama	Benji Schwimmer, Melanie LaPatin	
Lengua materna	Liliana Paolinelli	Argentina	Comedy	Nancy Anka, Claudia Cantero, Virginia Innocenti, Ana Katz, Claudia Lapacó	aka Mother Tongue,
Little White Lies (Les petits mouchoirs)	Guillaume Canet	France	Comedy, drama	François Cluzet, Marion Cotillard, Benoît Magimel, Gilles Lellouche, Jean Dujardin, Laurent Lafitte, Valérie Bonneton, Pascale Arbillot, Louise Monot, Anne Marivin, Joël Dupuch	
Loose Cannons	Ferzan Özpetek	Italy	Comedy, drama, romance	Riccardo Scamarcio, Alessandro Preziosi, Nicole Grimaudo, Lunetta Savino, Ennio Fantastichini, Ilaria Occhini, Elena Sofia Ricci	
LOVE, 100°C	Jho Kwang-soo Kim	South Korea	Short, drama, romance	Do-jin Kim, Jae-won Kwak and Se-Hyun Yun	22 minutes long,
Madame X	Lucky Kuswandi	Indonesia	Action, comedy	Amink, Marcell Siahaan, Titi DJ, Sarah Sechan, Joko Anwar, Vincent Rompies, Fitri Tropica, Robby Tumewu, Ria Irawan	Featured at 2011 Chicago International Film Festival
Mais ou Menos	Alexander Siqueira	Brazil	Short, drama	Jholl Bauer, Kyel Lima, Luiza Rossi and Gringo Starr	14 minutes long, aka More or Less
Man and Boy	David Leon, Marcus McSweeney	United Kingdom	Short, drama	Eddie Marsan, Geoff Bell, Calum MacNab and Eddie Webber	20 minutes long,
Man at Bath	Christophe Honoré	France	Drama	François Sagat, Chiara Mastroianni, Rabah Zahi, Omar Ben Sellam	
A Marine Story	Ned Farr	United States	Drama	Dreya Weber, Paris P. Pickard, Christine Mourad, Anthony Michael Jones, Jason Williams	
Mein Leben im Off	Oliver Haffner	Germany	Drama	Thomas Schmauser, Katharina M. Schubert, Rainer Furch, Eva Löbau, Sophie Basse, Matthias Bundschuh, Maik Solbach	aka My Life Off
A Montreal Girl (La Fille de Montréal)	Jeanne Crépeau	Canada	Drama	Amélie Grenier, Réal Bossé, Marie-Hélène Montpetit, Jean Turcotte	
Nightswimming	Dominic Leclerc	United States	Short, romance	Linzey Cocker, Tim Dantay and Harry Eden	14 minutes long,
Orchids, My Intersex Adventure	Phoebe Hart	Australia	Documentary	About director Phoebe Hart's understanding of her own intersex condition and others	Won the ATOM Award for Best Documentary General
Órói	Baldvin Zophoníasson	Iceland	Drama	Atli Oskar Fjalarsson, Ilva Holmes, Gísli Örn Garðarsson, Birna Rún Eiríksdóttir, Lilja Guðrún Þorvaldsdóttir, Elías Helgi Kofoed-Hansen, Haraldur Stefansson, Þorsteinn Bachmann	aka Jitters, won the Children's Film Award at the Kristiansand International Children's Film Festival.
Other Angels	Emre Yalgın	Turkey	Drama	Kanbolat Görkem Aslan, Özay Fecht, Ayta Sözeri, Buse Kılıçkaya, Seyhan Arman, Zeynep özcan, Didem Soylu, Müfit Aytekin	
Periods of Rain	J. Christopher Blackwell, Jason Blackwell	United States	Drama	Raymond Jacquet, Erika Alice, Justin Landry, Brandon Galatz, Joanna Jacobs, Mark Walsh, Jim Alexander	
Potiche	François Ozon	France	Comedy	Catherine Deneuve, Gérard Depardieu, Fabrice Luchini, Karin Viard, Judith Godrèche, Jérémie Renier	Screen story by Pierre Barillet and Jean-Pierre Gredy, based on their play of the same name
Role/play	Rob Williams	United States	Drama	Steve Callahan, Matthew Montgomery, David Pevsner, Brian Nolan, Matthew Stephen Herrick	Montgomery accepted the Philadelphia QFest 2010 Artistic Achievement Award for Acting
Room in Rome	Julio Médem	Spain	Romance, drama	Elena Anaya, Natasha Yarovenko, Enrico Lo Verso	a.k.a. Habitación en Roma; loosely based on another film, In Bed
The Runaways	Floria Sigismondi	United States	Drama, music	Dakota Fanning, Kristen Stewart, Michael Shannon	Based on the book Neon Angel: A Memoir of a Runaway by Cherie Currie, who was lead vocalist of the rock group of the same name
Sasha	Dennis Todorović	Germany	Comedy, crime, drama	Saša Kekez, Predrag Bjelac, Ljubisa Gruicic, Zeljka Preksavec, Gosia Konieczna, Tim Bergmann, Jasin Mjumjunov, Yvonne Yung Hee Bormann	
Scott Pilgrim vs. the World	Edgar Wright	United States; United Kingdom; Japan	Comedy	Michael Cera, Mary Elizabeth Winstead, Kieran Culkin, Chris Evans, Anna Kendrick, Alison Pill, Brandon Routh, Jason Schwartzman, Brie Larson, Mark Webber, Mae Whitman, Ellen Wong	Based on the graphic novel series Scott Pilgrim by Bryan Lee O'Malley
The Sons of Tennessee Williams	Tim Wolff	United States	Documentary	King Armeinius the 40th, Queen Armeinius the 40th, Queen Celeste the 9th, Queen Armeinius the 2nd, Queen Petronius XV, Queen Armeinius VI	Follows gay civil-rights movement in New Orleans in 1950s, with Mardi Gras celebrations and 'drag balls'
Stonewall Uprising	Kate Davis, David Heilbroner	United States	Documentary		Examines the events surrounding the Stonewall riots
Struggle	Bruce Locke	Canada	Drama	Jamie Potts, Matt Sims, Terri Stevens, Arthur Vilner	
Three	Tom Tykwer	Germany	Drama, romance, comedy	Sophie Rois, Sebastian Schipper, Devid Striesow, Angela Winkler	
Ticked-Off Trannies with Knives	Israel Luna	United States	Comedy, thriller	Krystal Summers, Kelexis Davenport, Willam Belli, Erica Andrews, Jenna Skyy, Tom Zembrod	
Vapor	Kaveh Nabatian	Canada	Short drama	Marco Ledezma, Evergon	
Watch Over Me (Shmor Alai)	Michael Rozanov	Israel	Short, drama, horror	Guy Kapulnik, Davidi Hoffman, Raz Weiner, Omri Tessler and Zvika Fohrman	14 minutes long also collated on 'Boys on Film 7: Bad Romance
We Are the Night	Dennis Gansel	Germany	Drama, fantasy, horror	Karoline Herfurth, Nina Hoss, Jennifer Ulrich, Anna Fischer, Max Riemelt	
White Paper (Kaghaz-e Sefid)	Seyed Mohsen Pourmohseni Shakib	Iran	Short, Animation		
Yes or No (Yak Rak Ko Rak Loei)	Sarasawadee Wongsompetch	Thailand	Comedy, romance	Sushar Manaying (credited as Aom Sucharat Manaying), Suppanad Jittaleela	
