= Honolulu Rainbow Film Festival =

LGBTQ film festival in Hawaii, USA

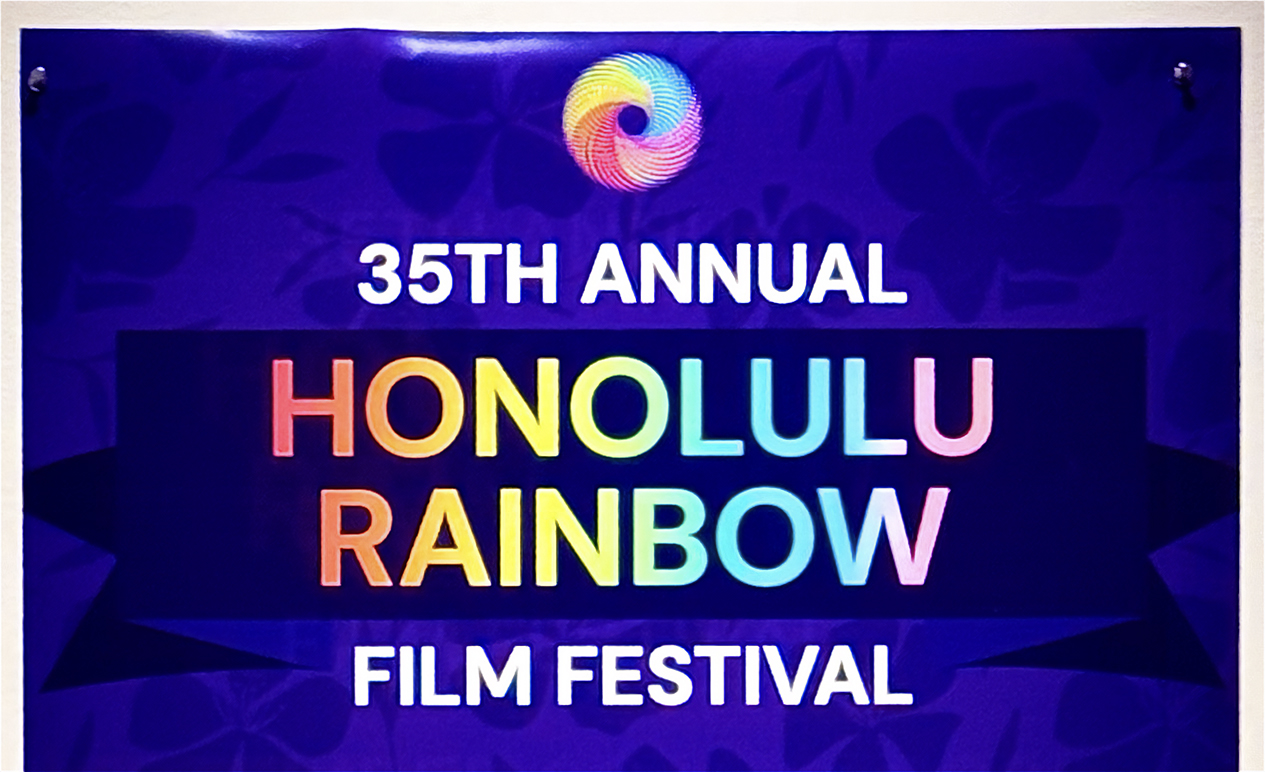
- Location: Honolulu, Hawaiʻi, U.S.
- Screening Venue: HoMA Doris Duke Theatre
- Established: 1989
- Language: International
- Festival Director: Brent Anbe
- Programming Director: Andrea Krauss
- Website: hrff.org

The Honolulu Rainbow Film Festival (HRFF) is an LGBT film festival held annually in Honolulu which began in 1989 as the Adam Baran Honolulu Gay and Lesbian Film Festival.

== History ==
Businessman Jack Law founded the non-profit Honolulu Gay & Lesbian Cultural Foundation (HGLCF) in 1997 as an umbrella organization for the Adam Baran Honolulu Gay and Lesbian Film Festival, now known as the Honolulu Rainbow Film Festival (HRFF).

Prior to establishment of the non-profit, the film festival (started in 1989), originally donated proceeds of the festival to the Life Foundation, the state's main AIDS/HIV organization. Today, the HGLCF is a self-supporting non-profit 501(c)3.

Films programmed at the HRFF have gone on to win Peabody and Emmy Awards, such as the documentary, Daddy & Papa. HRFF has worked with PBS Hawaiʻi to program LGBT content documentaries. In 2008, a pilot Neighbor Island Outreach in Hilo on the Big Island began.

== Events ==
The festival currently happens in the fall (around early August to late September). In-person film screenings are scheduled throughout a three-day weekend, starting on a Friday (which includes an opening reception in the evening) and ending that Sunday (with a red carpet award ceremony shortly after the final screening). Screenings take place at Doris Duke Theatre inside the Honolulu Museum of Art. A selection of short films become available to screen online during the week that follows.

== Awards ==
The types of awards at HRFF have varied throughout the years. Traditional awards include Best Narrative Feature, Best Documentary Feature, Best Narrative Short, Best Documentary Short, Best Hawaiʻi Short, Best Animation, Audience Award, Visionary Award, and Rising Star Award. The awards unique to this event are the Adam Baran Award (an LGBTQIA+ filmmaker that has excelled in their career in the film industry), the Jack Law Award (a person who best embodies the HGLCF's mission), the Rainbow Award (a film that intermixes LGBTQIA+ culture and introduces a new audience to HRFF), and the Phred Love Award (awarded exclusively to recognize Hawaiʻi filmmakers).

=== HRFF35 ===
Sept 20–22, 2024

- Best Narrative Feature - Duino (2024) directed by Juan Pablo Di Pace and Andrés Pepe Estrada
- Best Documentary Feature - Lady Like (2024) directed by Luke Willis
- Best Narrative Short - EKG (2024) directed by Q. Allan Brocka
- Best Documentary Short - Out of the Dark: Cal Calamia (2024) directed by Tom Mason and Sarah Klein
- Best Hawaiʻi Short - I Am (2024) directed by Tony Dia
- Best Made in Hawaiʻi Short - My Parents (2024) directed by Keliʻi Grace and Lance D. Collins
- Best Made in Hawaiʻi Student Short - One Night (2024) directed by Jason Lanuevo
- Audience Award Best Short - I Am directed by Tony Dia
- Adam Baran Award - Ayumi Kurokawa; Director of Until the Day I Call Her My Son (2024)

=== HRFF34 ===
September 8–10, 2023

- Grand Jury - My Partner (2022) directed by Keli'i Grace
- Best Narrative Short - To Ken with Love (2022) directed by Mike Talplacido
- Best Overall Short - Queerfully Departed (2023) directed by Trent Nakamura
- Best Hawaiian Short - A Tale of Two Sisters (2022) directed by Angelique Kalani Axelrode
- Audience Award Best Short - The Other John (2023) directed by Ryan Spahn
- Adam Baran Award - Andy Valentine; Director of The Mattachine Family (2024)
- Visionary Award - Jack Law
- Best Director - Jason Karman; Director of Golden Delicious (2022)

=== HRFF33 ===
October 21–23, 2022

The festival was held in-person for the first time since the 2020 COVID-19 pandemic.

- Best Narrative Feature - Wildhood (2021) directed by Bretten Hannam
- Best Documentary Feature - Jimmy in Saigon (2022) directed by Peter McDowell
- Best Narrative Short - Firsts (2022) directed by Jesse Ung
- Best Documentary Short - Gender Outlaw, a Body Surfing Story (2022) directed by Peter Williams
- Best Made In Hawaiʻi Short - Cosmic Laundry (2022) directed by Alexandra Livingston
- Audience Award Best Short - Cock nʻ Bull 3 (2022) directed by Nathan Adloff
- Special Jury Mention - Fishbowl (2021) directed by Jacqueline Chan
- Adam Baran Award - P.J. Palmer; Director of North Star (2022)
- Rising Star Award - Vaughan Murrae; Star of Before I Change My Mind (2022)

=== HRFF32 ===
July 30-Aug 15, 2021

In-person events were canceled for the second year in a row due to a spike in Hawai'i COVID-19 cases leading up to the festival.

- Best Documentary Feature - A Sexplanation (2021) directed by Alexander Liu
- Best Short Film - Retribution (2020) directed by Mel Orpen
- Best Narrative Short – Pool Boy (2021) directed by Luke Willis
- Best Documentary Short - Veni Etiam (2021) directed by Alex Hai and Mahtab Mansour
- Best Local Film - Other People (2019) directed by Bryson Kainoa Chun
- Best Animation - Kapaemahu (2020) directed by Hinaleimoana Wong-Kalu, Dean Hamer and Joe Wilson
- Audience Award Best Short - Hello Mother (2020) directed by Natalie Shirinian
- Special Jury Mention - I Know Her (2019) directed by Fawzia Mirza
- Adam Baran Award - Adam Bernard Baran; Director of Trade Center (2021)

=== HRFF31 ===
July 31-Aug 12, 2020

All in-person screenings and events were canceled due to the COVID-19 pandemic in 2020. For the first time since its conception, the festival moved to virtual screenings and awards.

- Best Narrative Short - My Friend Michael Jones (2018) directed by Ian Leaupepe and Samson Rambo
- Best Experimental Short - Safe Among Stars (2019) directed by Jess X. Snow
- Best Local Documentary Short - Parental Guidance Suggested (2020) directed by Dane Neves
- Best Local Narrative Short - The Longing Fade (2020) directed by Kaveh Kardan
- Audience Award Best Short - A Walk Home (2020) directed by Tsuyoshi Shoji
- Programmer Award Best Narrative Short - Melt (2018) directed by Moxie Peng
- Special Jury Mention - In Orbit (2019) directed Soham Chakraborty, Hanxu Chen, Meton Joffily, Justin Polley and Julia Trouvé
- Adam Baran Award - Kimi Howl Lee; Director of Kama’āina (2020)
- Rising Star Award - Malia Kamalani Soon; Star of Kama’āina (2020)

=== HRFF30 ===
Aug 8–18, 2019

- Best Short Film - Zero One (2019) directed by Nick Neon
- Adam Baran Award - Gia Gunn; Star of Follow Me (2018)
- Jack Law Award - Hannah Pearl Utt; Director of Before You Know It (2019)
- Phred Love Award - Sandy Livingston; Director of Dungeons & Drag Queens: The Quest for the Golden Wig of Enlightenment (2019)
- Phred Love Award - Dane Neves; Director of Outside the Lines: The Art of Cheyne Gallarde (2018)
- Rising Star Award - D.J. 'Shangela' Pierce; Star of Shangela is Shook (2020)

=== HRFF29 ===
Aug 9–19, 2018

- Best Narrative Feature - The Poet and the Boy (2017) directed by Yang-hee Kim
- Best Documentary Feature - She is the Ocean (2018) directed by Inna Blockhina
- Best Short Film - Lily (2016) directed by Graham Cantwell
- Jack Law Award - Madeleine Olnek; Director of Wild Nights with Emily (2018)
- Phred Love Award - Jessika Lawrence; Director of Nuclear (2018)

=== HRFF28 ===
Aug 10–19, 2017

- Best Narrative Feature - God's Own Country (2017) directed by Francis Lee
- Adam Baran Award - Tom Daley
- Jack Law Award - Dustin Lance Black

=== HRFF25 ===
June 10–15, 2014

- Best Narrative Feature - Tom at the Farm (2013) directed by Xavier Dolan
- Best Documentary Feature - The Case Against 8 (2014) directed by Ben Cotner and Ryan White
- Best Short Film - Grind (2014) directed by Zachary Halley
- Rainbow Award - Boy Meets Girl (2014) directed by Eric Schaeffer
- Rainbow Award - Out in the Line-Up (2014) directed by Ian W. Thomson
- Adam Baran Award - Alec Mapa; Director of Baby Daddy (2014)
- Jack Law Award - Daniel Ribeiro; Director of The Way He Looks (2014)
- Phred Love Award - Dean Hamer and Joe Wilson; Directors of Kumu Hina (2014)
- Rising Star Award - Kim Ho, Star of The Language of Love (2013)
- Rising Star Award - Michelle Hendley; Star of Boy Meets Girl (2014)

=== HRFF24 ===
June 4–9, 2013

- Best Narrative Feature - Any Day Now (2012) directed by Travis Fine
- Best Documentary Feature - I Am Divine (2013) directed by Jeffrey Schwarz
- Best Short Film - Holden (2012) directed by Juan Arcones and Roque Madrid
- Rainbow Award - Geography Club (2013) directed by Gary Entin
- Adam Baran Award - Xavier Dolan; Director of Laurence Anyways (2012)
- Jack Law Award - David W. Ross; Writer of I Do (2012)
- Phred Love Award - Branden Blinn; Director of Toeing the Line (2013) and A la Carte (2013)

=== HRFF23 ===
May 31-June 3, 2012

- Best Narrative Feature - Men to Kiss (2012) directed by Robert Hasfogel
- Best Documentary Feature - No Look Pass (2011) directed by Melissa Johnson
- Best Short Film - The Man That Got Away (2012) directed by Trevor Anderson
- Rainbow Award - Birds of a Feather (2011) directed by Anthony Meindl
- Adam Baran Award - Patrik-Ian Polk; Director of The Skinny (2012)
- Jack Law Award - Gina Caruso
- Phred Love Award - Keo Woolford; Director of Lunchtime (2010)

=== HRFF22 ===
May 12–15, 2011

- Best Narrative Feature - Romeos (2011) directed by Sabine Bernardi
- Best Narrative Feature - Codependent Lesbian Space Alien Seeks Same (2011) directed by Madeleine Olnek
- Best Documentary Feature - The Advocate for Fagdom (2011) directed by Angelique Bosio
- Best Short Film - I Was a Teenage Werebear (2011) directed by Tim Sullivan
- Rainbow Award - Three Veils (2011) directed by Rolla Selbak
- Adam Baran Award - Dan Jinks
- Jack Law Award - J.C. Calciano; Director of eCupid (2011)
- Phred Love Award - Beasty Training! v.8

=== HRFF21 ===
May 27–30, 2010

- Best Narrative Feature - Children of God (2009) directed by Kareem Mortimer
- Best Documentary Feature - City of Borders (2009) directed by Yun Suh
- Best Short Film - George & Brad in Bed (2009) directed by Jessica Sanders
- Rainbow Award - Is It Just Me? (2010) directed by J.C. Calciano
- Rainbow Award - The People I've Slept With (2010) directed by Quentin Lee
- Jack Law Award - Casper Andreas; Director of Violet Tendencies (2010)
- Phred Love Award - Arlei Patterson; Director of The Time of Our Lives (2009)

=== HRFF20 ===
May 21–24, 2009

- Best Narrative Feature - Clapham Junction (2007) directed by Adrian Shergold
- Best Documentary Feature - Ferron: Girl on a Road (2009) directed by Gerry Rogers
- Best Short Film - Weak Species (2009) directed by Dan Faltz
- Phred Love Award - Kevyn K.M. Fong; Director of Beauty Brawl (2009)

=== HRFF19 ===
May 22–25, 2008

- Best Narrative Feature - Tru Loved (2008) directed by Stewart Wade
- Best Documentary Feature - Pageant (2008) directed by Ron Davis
- Best Short Film - Thirteen or so Minutes (2008) directed by William Branden Blinn
- Adam Baran Award - Were the World Mine (2008) directed by Tom Gustafson
- Best Emerging Filmmaker - Katie Kelly; Director of Just Browsing (2008)
- Phred Love Award - Brent Anbe; Director of Get Me Bodied (2008)

=== HRFF17 ===
May 25–28, 2006

- Best Narrative Feature - Boy Culture (2006) directed by Q. Allan Brocka
- Best Narrative Documentary - Pursuit of Equality (2005) directed by Geoff Callan and Mike Shaw
- Best Short Film - Taco Chick and Salsa Girl (2005) directed by Kurt Koehler

=== HRFF16 ===
May 26–29, 2005

- Phred Love Award - Marc Moody; Director of Almost Normal (2005)

=== HRFF15 ===
May 27–30, 2004

- Adam Baran Award - Q. Allan Brocka; Director of Eating Out (2004)
- Phred Love Award - Brent Anbe; Director of One Night in Bangkok (2004)
- Best Short - The Visitor (2002) directed by Dan Castle

=== HRFF13 ===
May 30-June 2, 2002

- Best Short Film - Sinalele (2001), Directed by Dan Taulapapa McMullin

== See also ==
- Film festivals in North and Central America
- List of film festivals
- List of LGBT film festivals
