= List of Bahamian films =

The following is a list of Bahamian films or films made in the Bahamas.

== List of films ==
Title	Year	Director	Cast	Genre	Notes
Bahama Mama	2001	Phil Turner		Action short	Won Jury Prize at the Raindance Film Festival
Co-Incidence	2002	Cristian YoungMiller	Cristian YoungMiller, Stephanie Mello, Beverly Sotelo, Mark Weiler, Alisa Schulz, Patrick Thomas O'Brien, Zale Morris	Fantasy	
Conservation Through Education	2006	Kareem Mortimas		Short 11 minute documentary	Shot in San Salvador, Bahamas
Dolphins and Whales 3D: Tribes of the Ocean	2008	Jean-Michel Cousteau	Daryl Hannah	IMAX 3D documentary	footage of cetaceans (and manatees) from the Bahamas and various other locations on the planet
Eleutheran Adventure	2006	Kareem Mortimer		Short documentary	
Float	2007	Kareem Mortimer	Stephen Tyrone Williams, Rukenka Demeritte, Christopher Herrod	Romantic short	
King Lear	1987	Jean-Luc Godard	Woody Allen, Freddy Buache, Leos Carax, Julie Delpy, Jean-Luc Godard	Sci-Fi drama	With the United States and France
Jefford Curré Paradise Intrigue	1994	Jefford Curré	Jefford Curré Paradise Intrigue is the historical flagship film that kick-started the Bahamas Film Industry. The leading movie project of the Paradise Island based Megavision Pictures.		
Rain	2008	Maria Govan	Renel Brown, Nicki Micheaux, C. C. H. Pounder, Calvin Lockhart	Drama	
Rob and Amber Get Married	2005	Glenn Weiss	Amber Brkich, Colin Cowie, Rob Mariano (as themselves)	120 minutes Documentary	Rob Mariano, and Amber Brkich of Survivor All-Stars fame have just four weeks to plan their dream wedding in the Bahamas.
Sharks 3D	2004	Jean-Jacques Mantello		42 minute documentary	
Sirens of the Caribbean	2007	Stewart Raffill	AnnaLynne McCord, James Brolin, Antonio Sabato Jr., Mario Macaluso, Stacy Ann Rose, Marnee McClellan, Emmanuel Delcour	Sci-Fi Mystery	Working title: Sirens of Eleuthra
Jessica's Wish	2012	Nathaniel P. Lewis	Mahya Ornit James, Jethro Dixon, Dawn Role, Rene Hall, Donovan Bowe, Luck Timothy, Ana-Alicia Carroll	Drama	Provocative drama portraying a powerful story about love, sex and relationships.

== See also ==
- List of films shot in the Bahamas
