= Discreet =

Discreet may refer to:

- Discreet Logic, a subsidiary of Autodesk Media and Entertainment
- DiscReet Records
- Discreet (film), a 2017 film
