= I Want Your Love =

I Want Your Love may refer to:

- I Want Your Love (film), a 2010 drama short film and 2012 feature-length film
- I Want Your Love (album), an album by Brenda K. Starr
- "I Want Your Love" (Atomic Kitten song)
- "I Want Your Love" (Chic song)
- "I Want Your Love" (Eduard Romanyuta song)
- "I Want Your Love" (Transvision Vamp song)
- "I Want Your Love", a song by Toadies from No Deliverance
- "I Want Your Love", a song by David Bowie released on The Shel Talmy Recordings.
