= Café au lait (disambiguation) =

Café au lait is coffee with hot milk added.

Café au lait may also refer to:

== Films ==
- Métisse, a French film that is also titled Café au lait.
- You, Me and Him, a Brazilian short film that is also titled Café com Leite.

== Other ==
- Café au Lait (color)
- Café au lait spot, a type of birthmark
- Café com leite politics, Brazilian politics under the Old Republic
