= Da Sweet Blood of Jesus =

2014 film directed by Spike Lee

- Theatrical release poster
- Directed by: Spike Lee
- Written by: Spike Lee; Bill Gunn
- Based on: Ganja and Hess by Bill Gunn
- Produced by: Spike Lee; Chiz Schultz
- Starring: Zaraah Abrahams; Stephen Tyrone Williams; Rami Malek; Elvis Nolasco
- Cinematography: Daniel Patterson
- Edited by: Randy Wilkins
- Music by: Bruce Hornsby
- Production company: 40 Acres and a Mule Filmworks
- Distributed by: Gravitas Ventures
- Release dates: June 22, 2014 (American Black Film Festival); February 14, 2015 (United States)
- Running time: 123 minutes
- Country: United States
- Language: English
- Budget: $1.4 million

Da Sweet Blood of Jesus is a 2014 American horror film directed by Spike Lee. The plot is about a wealthy anthropologist who is stabbed by an ancient African dagger and turned into a vampire. Lee has said the film is about "[h]uman beings who are addicted to blood" and called it "[a] new kind of love story." The film is a remake of the 1973 film Ganja & Hess (with original writer Bill Gunn receiving a credit as co-writer, along with Lee). It was the first of Lee's films to be funded through Kickstarter. The film was released on June 22, 2014, at the American Black Film Festival as the closing film, and was released in theaters and on VOD on February 14, 2015, by Gravitas Ventures.

== Plot ==
The film opens with an unnamed dancer dancing in various locations around Brooklyn during the credit sequence.

From there, the plot follows Dr. Hess Green, a wealthy African-American anthropologist and art collector who acquires a dagger originating in the ancient Ashanti Empire, a highly advanced civilization that, Green claims, became addicted to blood transfusions. That night, Lafayette Hightower, an emotionally unstable colleague from the museum which acquired the dagger, visits Green's impressive, African-art covered Martha's Vineyard mansion. The two cordially discuss history and philosophy, but once Green has retired for the evening, Hightower becomes drunk and climbs a tree with a noose, claiming he wants to commit suicide. Green successfully talks him down, but later that night Hightower attacks and stabs Green with the Ashanti ceremonial dagger, killing him. Sometime later, Green is shocked to awaken—unscathed. He hears a gunshot and, upon discovering that Hightower has killed himself, he instinctively drinks Hightower's blood. He discovers that he is invulnerable to physical harm, can no longer tolerate normal food and drink, and has an insatiable need for more blood. Though he steals several bags of blood from a doctor's office, he quickly finds that he needs fresh victims. The first is a prostitute Lucky Mays who, shockingly, reawakens—only after he has discovered that her blood is HIV-positive. After a period of tension, it is determined that he has not contracted the virus.

Soon, Hightower's estranged ex-wife, Ganja Hightower, arrives at Green's house searching for her ex-husband, who owes her money. Green and Ganja quickly become lovers, and she moves into Green's expansive mansion. He departs "on business" and kills Sahara Paysinger, a young woman with a baby whom he meets in a public park in Brooklyn. While Green is away, Ganja unwittingly discovers her ex-husband's corpse—frozen in his wine cellar—she is initially angry, but after Green explains what happened and tells her that he loves her, she agrees to marry him. On the honeymoon night, he stabs her with the Ashanti dagger so that she will share immortality with him. Ganja is initially horrified by her new existence, but Green teaches her how to survive. He brings home an old female acquaintance Tangier Chancellor, for Ganja's first kill. Ganja seduces and then strangles Tangier. Ganja and Hess bury Tangier's body, even though, like Lucky from before, her "corpse" reawakens.

Green tells Ganja he is tired of this life and eventually visits a Red Hook church where he is moved by an energetic musical performance and approaches the altar to have the pastor lay hands on him. Meanwhile, back at home, Ganja murders Green's loyal domestic servant Seneschal Higginbottom. When she searches for Green to confess, she finds him in the shadow of a cross, dying. Green dies in her arms, glad to be at peace. Ganja, though saddened by his death, lives on, presumably continuing her vampire-esque lifestyle. At the movie's closing, we see her walk out to the beach and gaze out into the water. Tangier appears, still naked, approaches her then turns and they stand side by side facing the horizon.

== Cast ==
- Zaraah Abrahams as Ganja Hightower
- Stephen Tyrone Williams as Dr. Hess Greene
- Rami Malek as Seneschal Higginbottom
- Elvis Nolasco as Lafayette Hightower
- Felicia Pearson as Lucky Mays
- Jeni Perillo as Sahara Paysinger
- Naté Bova as Tangier Chancellor
- Katherine Borowitz as Ms. Staples
- Charles "Lil Buck" Riley as Jookin' Dancer

== Production ==
Lee explained that he originally turned to Kickstarter to fund the film, "...because I wanted to make this film but I knew no studio was going to make this film. It wasn't going to happen. I'm not saying that's a bad thing, but I'm just a realist and I wasn't going to spend a year knocking on doors and stuff like that." He claims he did not know anything about crowdfunding projects prior to the development of the film. The project's original goal was to raise $1,250,000; ultimately it raised $1.4 million. Lee confirmed that director Steven Soderbergh contributed $10,000 to get the film launched into production.

Because of the film's low budget, it was completed in only 16 days. It was filmed in Martha's Vineyard and in New York City.

For the soundtrack, Lee solicited music from unsigned, unknown artists via social media. Over 800 songs were submitted; Lee listened to all of them in a single weekend and eventually settled on 12 tracks by different unsigned artists (including singer-songwriter Siedah Garrett, best known for her career as a songwriter and backup singer for major acts including Michael Jackson, Madonna and Donna Summer). "I Don't Feel God" was recorded by NJ artist The IZM., aka Anthony L. Peterson. For the Dana Hilliard song "All Night," Lee and the producers added a horn section and Vernon Reid (of Living Colour) on guest guitar, but generally the songs were added to the movie unchanged. Two songs by Brazilian musician Milton Nascimento are also used. In addition to the soundtrack, Bruce Hornsby contributed an original score for the film which consists mainly of piano jazz.

As a remake, the film remains extremely close to the original plot of Ganja and Hess, "at times scene for scene and shot for shot," according to writer Scott Foundas of Variety. It uses so much of the original dialogue that original writer Bill Gunn (who died in 1989) is credited as a co-writer, along with Lee.

The opening credits note that the film is "An Official Spike Lee Joint," a possible reference to the studio interference Lee experienced on his previous film—his remake of the South Korean revenge thriller Oldboy—which led to the credits of that film describing it as "A Spike Lee Film" instead of his customary "A Spike Lee Joint."

== Release ==
A month prior to its theatrical release, the film was released through Vimeo, an online video-streaming service. This unusual measure was partly inspired by Vimeo's comparatively low cut of the profits from online rentals and sales (10%, as opposed to other web services which can take up to 45%) and partially a strategy to generate interest in the film. The film was released theatrically and on VOD on February 13, 2015, by Gravitas Ventures.

== Reception ==
Da Sweet Blood of Jesus received mixed reviews from critics. On Rotten Tomatoes, the film has an approval rating of 49% based on 43 reviews, with an average rating of 5.29/10. The site's critical consensus reads: "Da Sweet Blood of Jesus has no shortage of style, but it isn't enough to make this horror-tinged Spike Lee joint one of his best — or worth recommending." On Metacritic, the film has a rating of 52 out of 100 based on 19 critics, indicating "mixed or average" reviews.

Critic Matt Zoller Seitz gave the film three-out-of-four stars, and commented: "Lee's most persistent problem, an inability to unify his messages and make them cohere, doesn't really hurt him in Da Sweet Blood of Jesus because the film is a hypnotically nightmarish mood piece more than anything else... This will prove either maddening or refreshing, depending on whether your willingness to go where Lee takes you overwhelms your desire for something more conventionally neat and clearheaded." Scott Foundas of Variety was more reserved in his praise, calling the film a "gory yet oddly bloodless affair that's been made with a lot of craft and energy but ultimately little sense of purpose." The New York Times critic A.O. Scott also offered faint praise, writing: "This is, all in all, one of Mr. Lee's cooler joints, meaning both that it is suavely stylish and feels detached from its own emotions and motivations. It's not especially horrifying, or even very thought-provoking. It is touching, however, because it represents one frequently misunderstood, intermittently great filmmaker's tribute to another."

== See also ==
- List of black films of the 2010s
