= Fábio Audi =

Brazilian actor and producer

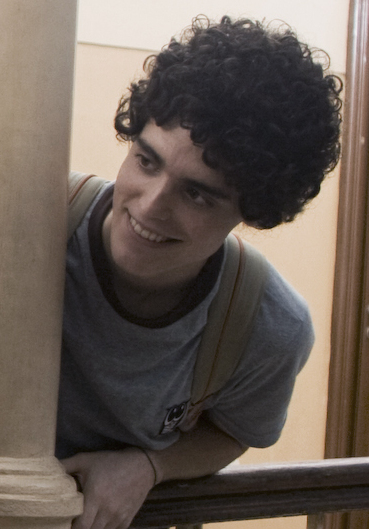
- Audi in 2014
- Born: December 9, 1987 (age 37); Itapira, São Paulo, Brazil
- Occupation(s): Actor, Photographer
- Years active: 2010–present

Fábio Audi (born December 9, 1987) is a Brazilian actor and producer.

== Career ==
He graduated in theater from the Superior School of Arts Célia Helena, and in cinema by the Armando Álvares Penteado Foundation (FAAP), both from São Paulo. He obtained a projection for his performance as Gabriel in the 2010 short film I Don't Want to Go Back Alone, directed by Daniel Ribeiro, playing the character Gabriel. He returned to represent the same role in the film's feature version The Way He Looks, also directed by Ribeiro, released in 2014.

In 2014, he made his television debut in the telenovela Alto Astral by Daniel Ortiz on Rede Globo, playing Heitor.

== Filmography ==
Film
Year	Title	Role	Notes
2010	I Don't Want to Go Back Alone	Gabriel	Short film
2014	The Way He Looks	Gabriel	
2016	Love Snaps	Fábio	Short film
2017	Febre	Marcos	Short film

Television
Year	Title	Role	Notes
2014	Alto Astral	Heitor Santana Peixoto	
2017	Under Pressure	Cadú Gerchman	Episode: "November 19, 2017"

== Awards and nominations ==
Year	Award	Category	Work	Results	Reference
2014	Prêmio for Rainbow	Best Actor	The Way He Looks	Won	
2014	Prêmio Guarani de Cinema Brasileiro	Revelation of the Year	The Way He Looks	Nominated	
2015	Prêmio Contigo! de TV	Revelation of TV	Alto Astral	Nominated	
