= Rain (2008 film) =

- Directed by: Maria Govan
- Written by: Maria Govan
- Produced by: Maria Govan; Nate Kohn; Pamela Kohn; Francis J. Kuzler; Molly M. Mayeux
- Starring: CCH Pounder; Nicki Micheaux; Renel Brown; Irma P. Hall
- Edited by: Maria Cataldo
- Music by: Gerald Brunskill
- Production companies: Rain Films; Dahlia Street Films; DedPro
- Distributed by: Image Entertainment
- Release dates: September 2008 (Toronto International Film Festival); July 27, 2010 (U.S. DVD)
- Running time: 93 minutes
- Country: Bahamas
- Language: English
- Budget: US$1 million

Rain is a 2008 Bahamian drama film directed by Maria Govan. This was among the first feature productions to be shot entirely by citizens of the Bahamas. Rain is among the final films of actor Calvin Lockhart.

== Plot ==
A young Bahamian girl, Rain, boards a local mail boat from Ragged Island and sets sail for Nassau. The death of her grandmother has forced her to get out and explore the world on her own. When she arrives in Nassau, the sights of the big city overwhelm her, and soon she finds her idealistic illusions shattered when she finds how destructive her mother's lifestyle has truly become. Stranded in an unfamiliar environment that fills her with dread and confronted by a mother she has never known, Rain searches desperately to find her own place in the world.

== Cast ==
- Renel Brown as Rain
- Nicki Micheaux as Glory
- CCH Pounder as Ms. Adams
- Irma P. Hall as Rosalie

== Production ==
Rain was the first film to be directed by Maria Govan, who raised the US$1 million budget through Bahamian investors. It was also one of the first features to be produced entirely in the Bahamas (the first being "Filthy Rich Gangster"), which had long been a filming location for the James Bond films among other efforts. Govan's film was shot during four weeks on three different islands of the Bahamas, including New Providence and Eleuthera; filming also took place in New York City.

== Release ==
In early September 2008, Rain received its world premiere at the Toronto International Film Festival. On December 4, 2008, it became the opening selection of the 2008 Bahamas International Film Festival.

Rain was released on DVD in the U.S. on July 27, 2010.

== Reception ==
When the film was shown at the Toronto Film Festival, Alissa Simon of Variety said: "Displaying an eye for composition, helmer Govan (who spent two years observing a crack house for docu Where I’m From: HIV and AIDS in the Bahamas), knows her milieu — essentially the antithesis of Bahamian tourist-board images. Martina Radwan’s gritty lensing and Denise Hudson’s detailed production design provide ample support." She, however, commented on "the script's melodramatic cliches and some weak supporting [performances]".

== See also ==
- List of Bahamian films
- List of LGBT-related films directed by women
