= Krewe of Yuga =

New Orleans Mardi Gras krewe

The Krewe of Yuga was the first gay Carnival krewe in New Orleans, founded in 1958 by members of the gay community. Costumed parties to view the Krewe of Carrollton parade in Uptown were transformed into a krewe with a Queen reigning over the festivities, a ball captain, and sometimes a King. Emulating the format established by traditional Carnival krewes and their courts, such as the Krewe of Proteus and the Mystick Krewe of Comus, the Krewe of Yuga also declared itself a royal krewe with its Yuga Regina. The queen was always a gay man in drag and these celebrations mark a significant point in the history of the city. The Krewe is referenced in the 2010 documentary The Sons of Tennessee Williams.

Homosexuality was against the law at the time, so the tableau balls of the Krewe of Yuga were always clandestine, hidden away, and known only to those invited to participate in the festivities. Due to a police raid in 1962, the krewe dissolved. However, the template for other gay krewes had been set in place, and the Krewe of Petronius, along with the Krewe of Amon-Ra, the Krewe of Ganymede, and the Krewe of Armeinius, boldly continued to declare themselves, albeit always behind closed doors, as a royal krewe.
