= Krewe of Armeinius =

Social organization

The Krewe of Armeinius is one of the private groups, krewes, that celebrate the annual Mardi Gras festival in New Orleans.

== History and activity ==
Carnival in New Orleans is an important facet of its history and has become an integral part of the city's love of celebration. Private groups who celebrate Carnival, or Mardi Gras, are called krewes and date back to the mid-19th century, often secretive and exclusive. By the late 1950s, gay groups began to form their own krewes, but because of societal stigma and even laws making homosexuality illegal, these krewes celebrated in the shadows and were hidden for the most part from the overt celebrations of Carnival. However, by the 1980s before the AIDS pandemic, gay Carnival had exploded and enjoyed a Golden Age of creativity and visibility. Important early gay krewes were the Krewe of Yuga and the Krewe of Petronius. One of these early krewes was the Krewe of Armeinius.

The Krewe of Armeinius was formed in 1968 and is one of the oldest active gay krewes in New Orleans. Wendell Stipelcovich, who was a member of the short-lived Krewe of Ganymede, channelled his artistic and creative talents into the creation of a new krewe, along with Tracy Hendrix, formerly of the Krewe of Yuga, Jerry Loner, Don Stratton, and Scott Morvant. Combining the legends of the Teutonic hero who defeated Roman generals in battle and the mythical lover of Narcissus, the name Armeinius remains true to the mysterious nature of Carnival itself. Stipelcovich served as the krewe's first captain and set the tone for some of the most opulent and camp balls in New Orleans Carnival history. The first ball in 1969 showcased various historical queens entitled The Year of the Queen. Other artists in the krewe were Albert Carey, who orchestrated the fantastical Atlantis Redivivus ball in 1971 in which the lost city of Atlantis and its inhabitants were transformed into sea creatures on stage, and Jon Lee Poché, who wrote a gay fairy-tale for the 1985 ball The Boy Who Would Be Queen.

Tim Wolff, in his 2010 documentary entitled The Sons of Tennessee Williams, focused primarily on the Krewe of Armeinius and its importance to the city of New Orleans' Carnival celebrations. Williams used high-definition cameras to record their tableau presentations, which exhibited a milestone in costume design and choreography as well as stage production. "Wolff cuts back and forth from reminiscences of the tradition's early days to preparations for a 2008 ball celebrating 40 years of the Armeinius Krewe, which has survived AIDS, Katrina and the graying of its ranks," summed up John DeFore of the Hollywood Reporter.

To help celebrate the 300th anniversary of New Orleans, Armeinius presented its 50th ball in 2018 and rewrote this long history, all with gay characters, such as Jean Lafitte and Sieur Iberville. The title was Fifty Years of Fabulous coordinated by the krewe's captains: Fred Arocho, Chad Brickley, Barrett DeLong-Church, and Freddie Guess. For its 2019 ball, the krewe took the theme Shhh, It's a Secret, where everyone in attendance was commanded to dress beautifully. The krewe continues to prosper and its ranks now include many young men along with seasoned veterans.
