= Three (2010 film) =

2010 film

- Film poster
- Directed by: Tom Tykwer
- Written by: Tom Tykwer
- Produced by: Stefan Arndt
- Starring: Sophie Rois; Sebastian Schipper; Devid Striesow
- Cinematography: Frank Griebe
- Edited by: Mathilde Bonnefoy
- Music by: Reinhold Heil; Johnny Klimek; Gabriel Isaac Mounsey; Tom Tykwer
- Production company: X Filme Creative Pool
- Distributed by: X Verleih AG (through Warner Bros.)
- Release dates: 10 September 2010 (Venice); 23 December 2010 (Germany)
- Running time: 120 minutes
- Country: Germany
- Language: German

Three (German: Drei) is a 2010 German drama film written, co-scored and directed by Tom Tykwer. The film was nominated for the Golden Lion at the 67th Venice International Film Festival.

== Plot ==
Hanna and Simon have been a couple for twenty years, and their relationship, though loving, has grown a bit habitual and sexually unexciting. Soon after Simon's mother dies by suicide after being diagnosed with advanced pancreatic cancer, he discovers that he has testicular cancer and must undergo surgery and chemotherapy. The night of his surgery, Hanna has a sexual encounter with a man called Adam, and Simon learns that he had fathered a child seventeen years earlier, although the woman opted for an abortion. Simon, who had assumed that either he or Hanna was infertile, is assured that he should still be able to have children after his surgery. After he is discharged from the hospital, Simon and Hanna decide to finally wed. Shortly beforehand, Simon encounters Adam at the pool and begins an affair with him as well.

Hanna and Simon's separate affairs with Adam lead to greater happiness and sexual desire felt for one another. Adam, unaware that his two lovers are involved, develops feelings for them both. The affairs are divulged soon after Hanna discovers that she is pregnant (because she was sleeping with both Adam and Simon at the time of conception, she does not know the identity of the father) and arrives at Adam's apartment to deliver the news when Simon is already there.

Now separated, neither Hanna nor Simon contact Adam. Hanna goes to stay with a friend in England, where she discovers that she is pregnant with twins. After she receives an invitation to an art gallery exhibition in Germany from Simon, she reconnects with him and tells him, that she's expecting twins. The two admit that they have missed each other, but that they also miss Adam, and both are surprised to see Adam at the gallery as part of a choir performing there. The film ends with the couple arriving at Adam's flat, who looks surprised but happy, and they coalesce into a happy spooning threesome.

== Cast ==
- Sophie Rois as Hanna
- Sebastian Schipper as Simon
- Devid Striesow as Adam
- Angela Winkler as Simon's mother Hildegard
- Annedore Kleist as Lotte
- Alexander Hörbe as Dirk
- Winnie Böwe as Petra
- Hans-Uwe Bauer as Dr Wissmer

== Reception ==
On review aggregator website Rotten Tomatoes, the film holds an approval rating of 47% based on 32 reviews, with an average rating of 5.8/10.

== See also ==
- List of lesbian, gay, bisexual or transgender-related films of 2010
