= Cristian YoungMiller =

- Born: Cristian Miller; November 19, 1972; Nassau, Bahamas
- Website: www.rateabull.com/Cristian

Cristian YoungMiller (born November 19, 1972) is an author and director (credited as one of the first Bahamians to direct a full-length movie).

== Early years ==
Born Cristian Andrew Miller, he is the son of Sandra Young (Miller-Byles), the first Miss Universe contestant from the Bahamas.

== Career ==
Working under multiple pen names, YoungMiller is an international best selling author of over 100 novels, short stories and audiobooks that have been translated into 6 languages. He is most known for his adult romances which have hit #1 in both French and Portuguese.

In 2001, YoungMiller directed 'Co-Incidence' (2002) (see List of Bahamian films). Credited as one of the first Bahamians after Sidney Poitier to direct a full-length feature, his movie became the first SAG experimental film to ever get theatrical distribution when it was distributed at Galleria Cinemas in the Bahamas. In 2006, he co-founded the website RememberTheBahamas.com, which became the largest retail website in the world specializing in merchandise from the Bahamas. In 2008, he founded RateABull.com, an online community where members ask other members for advice on relationships and personal topics. In 2013, he became the lead software designer for My Publishing Assistant, a suite of software designed to make self-publishing easier.

Under then name Cristian YoungMiller, he has published the novels "Run From The Reaper", "Fixing Cupid" (#1 downloaded humor book on Amazon on Black Friday 2011), "The First Day After Life", and "Happiness Thru the Art of... Penis Enlargement: A 'Novel Guide' to Jelqing, The G-spot, How to Last Longer in Bed and Other Sexual Secrets" for which he was featured in the documentary 'Unhung Hero' (2013) as an expert. He is the author the children's/humor books "Everybody Masturbates", "Everybody Masturbates for Girls", "Everybody Has Those Thoughts So It Doesn't Mean You're Gay" and "Everybody vs. The Ferret".

== Notable accomplishments ==
At 19, YoungMiller was asked by the noted sculpture Eugene A. Horvath to be a model for what would become the artist's last work. The life-sized bronze statue now stands at 400 W. State Street in Rockford, Ill, USA. YoungMiller kneels in the front row holding a rifle and giving a peace sign.

In 2013, YoungMiller was a member of the U.S. Nationals Touch Rugby Champions, the L.A. Royals.
