= Divaldo: O Mensageiro da Paz =

- Directed by: Clovis Mello
- Written by: Clovis Mello; Luciane Toffoli
- Starring: Bruno Garcia; Ghilherme Lobo; Regiane Alves; Marcos Veras
- Music by: Hilton Raw
- Distributed by: 20th Century Fox
- Release date: 2019
- Running time: 119 minutes
- Country: Brazil
- Language: Portuguese

Divaldo: O Mensageiro da Paz (English: Divaldo: A Messenger of Peace) is a Brazilian biographical film directed by Clovis Mello based on the book Divaldo Franco by Ana Landin, who it addresses the life of the renowned Brazilian spiritist Divaldo Franco.

The film tells the story of Divaldo Franco in three distinct stages between the 1920s and 1950s: childhood, youth, and adulthood. During this journey, Divaldo delves into the world of spiritism and is guided by Jeanne des Anges, who claims to be his "spiritual mentor."

== Cast ==
- Bruno Garcia as Divaldo Franco
  - João Bravo as Divaldo (child)
  - Ghilherme Lobo as Divaldo (young)
- Osvaldo Mil as Nilson
  - Bruno Suzano as Nilson (young)
- Regiane Alves as Jeanne des Anges
- Álamo Facó as Chico Xavier
- Marcos Veras as Espíritu Obsesor
- Laila Garin as Ana (Divaldo's mother)
- Ana Cecília Costa as Laura
- Nelson Baskerville as Father Carmelho
