= Pursuit of Equality =

- Directed by: Geoff Callan; Mike Shaw
- Produced by: Geoff Callan
- Starring: Gavin Newsom; George W. Bush; Rosie O'Donnell
- Cinematography: Geoff Callan; Mike Shaw
- Edited by: Mike Shaw
- Music by: John DeBorde
- Release date: April 24, 2005 (San Francisco International Film Festival)
- Running time: 81 minutes
- Country: United States
- Language: English

Pursuit of Equality is a 2005 American documentary film directed by Geoff Callan and Mike Shaw, about the struggle of same-sex couples for marriage equality in the United States. Its focus is mostly on the same-sex marriages performed in San Francisco from February 12 to March 11, 2004.

A major fundraising event for Equality California was also inspired by, and named after, the film. Callan, along with San Francisco mayor Gavin Newsom and philanthropists Christopher Bently and Wilkes Bashford, hosted a wedding celebration titled The Pursuit of Equality in order to increase public awareness of this issue before the November 4th vote on California Proposition 8.

== Synopsis ==
By issuing same-sex marriage licenses, San Francisco Mayor Gavin Newsom uproots the status quo, attempts to change the way the nation looks at life, love, and marriage.

From the first frame of the film, even before the press is aware, this film crew is with Mayor Gavin Newsom's senior staff as the nation's first same-sex couple exchange their vows and ignite a controversial civil rights topic.

The story continues on the streets, in the courtrooms, and on the steps of City Hall, where same-sex couples clash with church groups who declare that their sexual and romantic desires are sinful.

The film focuses on the compelling, human rights struggles surrounding same-sex marriage and captures the elation and despair of couples and families who are fighting for equal rights.

This film made the independent film festival circuit, winning multiple awards, and is scheduled for a wider release in the United States in 2008.

== Awards ==
- 2005: San Francisco International Film Festival, Audience Award for Best Documentary
- 2006: San Luis Obispo Film Festival, Audience Award for Best Documentary
- 2006: Melbourne Queer Film Festival, Audience Award for Best Documentary
- 2006: Sonoma Valley Film Festival, Audience Award for Best Documentary
- 2006: Honolulu Rainbow Film Festival, Audience Award for Best Documentary
- 2006: Palm Springs International Film Festival, Best of the Fest
- 2009: GLAAD Media Awards, Special Recognition for Directors Geoff Callan and Mike Shaw

== See also ==
Geoff Callan and Grant Korgan co-directed the 2018 film, The Push, a sports documentary being a biographical film following the comeback of Grant Korgan to be the first athlete with a spinal cord injury "to push" himself to the South Pole.
