= Johnny Ferro =

American actor

Johnny Ferro is an American actor. He won the Best Actor Award at the 23rd Out on Film festival for his performance in Children of God (2010).

== Filmography ==
=== As film actor ===
| Year | Title | Role | Notes |
|---|---|---|---|
| 2008 | I Think I Thought | Unknown | Short film |
| 2009 | The Video Guys | Chuck | |
| 2010 | Children of God | Johnny Roberts | |
| 2013 | Cowardly | Charlie | Short film |
| 2016 | Nearsighted | Unknown | Short film |
| 2017 | VW | Unknown | Short film |
| 2018 | Follow the River | Tommy Rooney | Short film |
| 2020 | Zero F**ks | Daniel | |
| 2023 | Ingress | Toby | |

=== As television actor ===
| Year | Title | Role | Notes |
|---|---|---|---|
| 2016 | Travel Boobs | Billy | 1 episode |
| 2016 | Casual | Daveed | 1 episode |
| 2014-2017 | Hand of God | PJ Harris (Pernell Jr.) | 19 episodes |
| 2017 | There's... Johnny! | Buddy Klavin | 3 episodes |
| 2018 | Chicago P.D. | Alex | 1 episode |
| 2020 | Crescendo | Sam | TV movie |
| 2020 | Solve | Officer Thompson | 1 episode |
