= Thirteen or So Minutes =

- Release poster
- Directed by: William Branden Blinn
- Screenplay by: William Branden Blinn
- Produced by: Jorge Ameer; Austin Anderson
- Starring: Nick Soper; Carlos F. Salas
- Cinematography: Jonathan Benjamin
- Edited by: Austin Anderson
- Music by: Nicola Quilter
- Release date: May 22, 2008 (Honolulu Rainbow Film Festival)
- Running time: 14 minutes
- Country: United States
- Language: English

Thirteen or So Minutes is an independent, short film directed by William Branden Blinn. It covers social and sexuality issues and has won prizes at the Honolulu Rainbow Film Festival and NYIIFVF.

== Premise ==
The plot centers on Lawrence and Hugh, who have just met and had sex spontaneously, even though neither of them has been attracted to men before. They talk about what has happened and why they each felt a strong desire to be so intimate with the other.
