= 16 to Life =

- Film poster
- Directed by: Becky Smith
- Written by: Becky Smith
- Produced by: Terry Trimpe
- Starring: Hallee Hirsh; Shiloh Fernandez; Mandy Musgrave; Theresa Russell
- Cinematography: Quyen Tran
- Edited by: Eleanor Infante
- Music by: H. Scott Salinas
- Production company: Waterdog Films
- Distributed by: Waterdog Films
- Release date: August 29, 2009 (Landlocked Film Festival)
- Running time: 90 minutes
- Country: United States
- Language: English

16 to Life is a 2009 American comedy film written and directed by Becky Smith. It stars Hallee Hirsh as Kate, a bookish teen about to turn 16 who plays match-maker for her friends. Shiloh Fernandez, Mandy Musgrave, Theresa Russell, Carson Kressley and Nicholas Downs also star. The film was originally titled Duck Farm No. 13, but the title was changed to appeal to younger audiences; it was filmed primarily in McGregor, Iowa and premiered August 29, 2009 at the Landlocked Film Festival.

== Premise ==
An omniscient narrator begins the film only to have the main character, Kate, interrupt him to add her point of view. This introduction sets the scene as we watch Kate arrive at the riverside malt shoppe, Float-on-Inn. She arrives early to read a book about the cultural revolution in China. Not your typical 16-year-old.

Kate helps her co-workers navigate their dreams, horoscopes, and moral dilemmas. At the same time, she has her own moral dilemma to navigate. Today is Kate's birthday. She's 16 and never been kissed.
