= The Sons of Tennessee Williams =

2010 American historical documentary film

- Film poster
- Directed by: Tim Wolff
- Based on: Actual events
- Produced by: Tim Wolff
- Cinematography: Eric Adkins
- Edited by: Matt Bucy; Tim Wolff
- Music by: Ratty Scurvics
- Production company: Wolffhouse
- Distributed by: First Run Features
- Release date: June 26, 2010
- Running time: 75 minutes
- Country: United States
- Language: English
- Box office: $3,242

The Sons of Tennessee Williams is a 2009 American historical documentary film produced and directed by Tim Wolff. The film spans five decades documenting the gay carnival balls in New Orleans, and the efforts of the gay community to celebrate Mardi Gras, without being discriminated against and without fear of police intervention. It stars Charles Maddox, Tommy Dietsch, George Roth, Don Stratton, Jimmy Keyes, Mike Moreau, John Henry Bogie, Albert Carey, Bianca Del Rio and additional krewe club members that share their memories through interviews and archival footage.

The film had its world premiere at Frameline Film Festival on June 26, 2010. It was released to theaters on October 7, 2011. Wolff said the title of the film came about as a twist on The Daughters of the American Revolution; he considers Williams a hero and inspiration, and said he was "the most famous out American at the time, telling the story of gay men to a much larger audience".

== Synopsis ==
The film uses archival footage and interviews with several older gay men to show the progression of the New Orleans gay krewe clubs over five decades, and their fight to be treated equally. It concludes by documenting the preparations for the 40th annual Krewe of Armeinius carnival ball.

== Cast ==
Appearing as themselves

- Charles Maddox
- Tommy Dietsch
- George Roth
- Don Stratton
- Jimmy Keyes
- Mike Moreau
- John Henry Bogie
- Albert Carey
- Tracy Hendrix
- Steve Labranche
- Freddie Guess
- Bill Woolley
- Wendell Stipelcovich
- George Patterson
- Charles Turberville
- Bill McLemore
- Adam Matthews
- Abram Bowie
- Gary De Leaumont
- Bianca Del Rio

== Film background and history ==
By the end of the 1950s, public assembly by homosexuals was against the law in all 50 states. In New Orleans, there were laws that specifically targeted the LGBT population.

In 1992, Wolff was fresh out of film school, and moved to New Orleans. Some friends invited him to a gay ball, and thinking he was well versed in gay culture, was surprised at the organization and the years of tradition that went into this thing. He knew then that he wanted to create a documentary, his first, and it ended up being an 18-year project for him. When he first started investigating the history of these secret cabals of gay men reveling in the Mardi Gras festivities in the early 1940s and into the 1950s, he realized there was also a story to be told about the civil rights significance of how these men established the first gay civil rights in America. Wolff was quoted in The Times-Picayne saying: "Public assembly is one of the primary civil rights that Americans are guaranteed, and this was not something that gay people had".

Wolff found that the first openly gay krewe club, The Krewe Of Yuga, was started in January 1959, which was inspired in part by the acquittal of three college students who had beat a homosexual man to death the year before. Albert Carey, who was interviewed in the film, was a closeted gay freshman at the time at Tulane University. He tells the story, along with Wolff using archival footage, about how Fernando Rios, a 26 year old Mexican tour guide, was murdered after being lured out of a gay bar on Bourbon street. He was beaten to death by three Tulane students who later admitted that their intentions that night were to go out and "roll some queers". At the trial, their defense attorneys argued, based on the coroners report, that Rios had an "eggshell skull", an insufficient cranial thickness, and therefore it was the victim's fault for not having the ability to withstand the beating. The lawyers referred to Rios as a "medical freak", and the three were eventually acquitted based on the theory it was his own fault. Spectators in the packed courtroom stood and applauded and cheered after the not guilty verdict was read.

The Krewe Of Yuga lasted for a couple of years before a police raid on one of their carnival balls resulted in the arrest of dozens of gay men. They were charged with disturbing the peace, and plead guilty. The Times-Picayune published all their names, which the newspaper frequently did for homosexuals who were arrested in sting operations specifically targeted at the gay community. It was after that arrest, several of the men in the film told how they decided enough was enough, and they needed to do something to prevent this from happening in the future. They learned how a carnival ball was structured and how to make it a legitimate activity. The straight krewe clubs were getting a charter that formally recognized them as an authorized organization in the state. The men had some lawyers amongst them, so they went to city hall and got a charter for their own carnival club, officially establishing the Krewe Of Petronius in 1961. Wolff told The Times-Picayne that these men "risked everything 50 years ago" to become "pioneers of gay civil rights in the U.S."

In the 1980s, the krewes had to deal with the AIDS crisis, which saw their membership numbers drop, and then Hurricane Katrina, which affected all of New Orleans. After the hurricane, the gay krewes started to band together and share their resources. The film picks up in 2008, where the remaining and newly recruited members, prepare for the 40th annual Krewe of Armeinius carnival ball, hosted and emceed by Bianca Del Rio.

== Release ==
The film had its world premiere at the Frameline Film Festival in San Francisco on June 26, 2010. It also had additional screenings at the Palm Springs International Film Festival, the Connecticut Gay & Lesbian Film Festival and at Inside Out Film and Video Festival in Toronto. The movie had a limited theatrical release on October 7, 2011, with an opening weekend gross of $1,492, and a total gross of $3,242. It was released to DVD on February 14, 2012.

== Reviews ==
Paul Brunick of The New York Times wrote "as the film cuts back and forth between the present day and a historical survey of gay culture, its tone wavers between dutifully somber and irrepressibly funny". The Hollywood Reporter said the documentary "combines extravagance of Mardi Gras drag with an underexposed story of early gay-rights achievements". Noel Murray said the movie is one "long coming-out anecdote", which is split amongst multiple people interviewed in the film. He further stated the significance of those anecdotes showed a "message of unity to the way Mardi Gras" inspired them to finally be able to express their true selves, and that "can’t be overstated, either for its impact on human rights or its power to move". Terrence Butcher of PopMatters objected to the "near complete absence of African-Americans in the film", and complained the "exclusion of African-Americans is a glaring and curious omission". In response to the lack of black voices in the film, Wolff told Xtra Magazine that he "made a movie that occurs in a segregated American city, like every other city in America, and you notice".

Diego Semerene of Slant Magazine was dissatisfied with the film saying it "fixates on the sort of obnoxiously conventional documentary concerns that turns the subjects of history into character-less spokesmen delivering today’s lesson plan". He rated the film. Dennis Harvey wrote in his review for Variety that the film "makes for a pleasant sit but doesn't really have the substance to deliver the aimed-for tenor of inspirational struggle...in the end, the pic simply peters out, never finding a strong narrative thread or editorial strategy to lift it beyond being a glorified scrapbook". Kevin Thomas of the Los Angeles Times said the film is a "consciousness-raising revelation of the evolution of gay rights in New Orleans... and how the gay krewes become not just a focal point for the local gay community but a political force as well".

== See also ==
- Krewe of Yuga
- Mardi Gras in New Orleans
- Mistick Krewe of Comus
- List of LGBT-related films of 2010

== Sources ==
- Wolff, Tim (2010). The Sons of Tennessee Williams (video). Wolffhouse.
