= Jack Law =

Jack Law is a businessman and LGBT activist based in Waikiki, Hawaii, United States. As a businessman he helped establish and operate two nightclubs and bars in Waikiki: The Wave Waikiki and Hula's Bar & Lei Stand, while as an advocate for LGBT rights and culture he founded the Life Foundation and the Honolulu Rainbow Film Festival, which publicized LGBT culture in Hawaii. He was appointed by Governors John Waihee and Ben Cayetano to the State of Hawaii Civil Rights Commission, where he served for eight years.

== Early years ==
Born in Philadelphia, Pennsylvania, Law spent his early years in Detroit, Michigan. When he was aged 7 his military family moved temporarily to Florida, before returning to Detroit.

Law worked at a record company in downtown Detroit as a young man, during the heyday of Motown Records, before moving with two friends to Honolulu, Hawaii. One of the trio returned to Michigan after one year, but Law and his friend John Dobovan made Hawaii their home. "I can't imagine what my life would have been like if I hadn't come to Hawaii," said Law. "I strongly feel that we have a choice and there's a dichotomy of being predestined for certain things. I really feel like I was predestined to come to Hawaii".

== East West Productions ==
While assisting Bob Magoon on a musical production, Law started a record company called East West Productions. He and Magoon formed a band, The Potted Palm. Jack produced their record and subsequently began managing the group, as well as other artists and bands.

== Venue owner ==
Law later entered the real estate business with Bob Magoon. In 1974, on a property made available by the Magoon Estate, they established a bar on the corner of Kuhio Avenue and Kalaimoku Street in Waikiki, under a banyan tree, named Hula's Bar and Lei Stand. The bar became a landmark for the local LGBT community, and something of an anchor tenant in what became known as the "Kuhio District" (named after San Francisco's Castro District), an area popular with the LGBT community.

In 1979, Law acquired another vacant building, which opened as The Wave Waikiki in November 1980. The Wave became a venue for live rock and roll music, before closing in 2006.

In 1996 the Magoon Estate sold their development rights to the property where Hula's Bar and Lei Stand was located, and in 1998 the bar had to move to a new location on the second floor of the Waikiki Grand Hotel, named View Hula's.

== Civic activism ==
Law was appointed by Governors Waihee and Cayetano to the State of Hawaii Civil Rights Commission, where he served for 8 years. He was also asked by Dr. David McEwen to become a founding board member of the Life Foundation; the first board meeting was held at Law's home.

Law founded the Honolulu Adam Baran Gay Film Festival, in honor of his close friend, a video editor who died during the HIV/AIDS epidemic. The festival has grown to become the Honolulu Rainbow Film Festival in Honor of Adam Baran and the Gay and Lesbian Cultural Foundation. In 2009, Law stepped down as president.
