= List of films shot in the Bahamas =

This is a list of commercial films which were shot at least partly in the Bahamas.

== Films ==
- Desperate Journey (1942)
- 20,000 Leagues Under the Sea (1954)
- Flipper's New Adventure (1964)
- Help! (1965)
- Thunderball (1965)
- Around the World Under the Sea (1966)
- You Only Live Twice (1967)
- The Day of the Dolphin (1973)
- The Next Man (1976)
- The Spy Who Loved Me (1977)
- Moonraker (1979)
- The Island (1980)
- For Your Eyes Only (1981)
- Never Say Never Again (1983)
- Splash (1984)
- Wet Gold (1984)
- Cocoon (1985)
- Jaws: The Revenge (1987)
- Cocoon: The Return (1988)
- Shoot to Kill (1988)
- The Silence of the Lambs (1991)
- Jefford Curre' Paradise Intrigue (1994)
- My Father the Hero (1994)
- Flipper (1996)
- Zeus and Roxanne (1997)
- The Insider (1999)
- Holiday in the Sun (2001)
- After the Sunset (2004)
- Into the Blue (2005)
- Casino Royale (2006)
- Pirates of the Caribbean: Dead Man's Chest (2006)
- Pirates of the Caribbean: At World's End (2007)
- Miracle at St. Anna (2008)
- Fool's Gold (2008)
- Blue (2009)
- Beneath the Blue (2010)

== See also ==
- List of Bahamian films
