= Brenden Shucart =

American actor

- Born: Brenden Gregory Shucart; April 13, 1981 (age 45)
- Occupations: Writer, actor, HIV and gay rights activist, editor-at-large for Positive Frontiers, Frontiers LA

Brenden Shucart (aka Brenden Gregory) is an American HIV/AIDS and LGBT rights activist, actor, and writer. His work has been featured in The Advocate, The Huffington Post and Frontiers LA. Currently living in Los Angeles, California, he sits on the board of Project Inform, a non-profit aimed at reducing the spread of HIV through awareness and education. He is also co-founder of the Bright Young Gentleman's Adventuring Society, which helps to raise money for other HIV-related organizations.

== HIV news and opinion ==
Appearing in The Advocate and The Huffington Post, and as editor-at-large for Positive Frontiers (a department of Frontiers), Shucart's writing about HIV-related health issues and stigma has been described as "humanizing and heartbreaking" and "beautiful, honest, and important". On PrEP and its effects on the HIV+ community:

Either way it is a question of comfort and quality of life, not morality. In a very real way the existence of PrEP forces all gay men to face a similar choice. Many will choose to continue using condoms, and some might not. But rather than slut-shaming them and calling them whores we should be educating them and empowering them to have healthy and rewarding sex lives.

For many of us living with HIV, that's what the FDA's approval of Truvada for use as PrEP means—hope. Hope that one day we can let our guard down, be less than perfectly vigilant and love without fear.

On HIV transmission:

My greatest fear is that I am going to give you HIV. In fact, I am just as afraid of passing along my virus as you are of contracting it. And that is true for most of the HIV-positive guys I know.

== Acting career ==
In the short film Bug Chaser, Shucart played the role of a gay man who finds himself with an unexplainable infection after a one-night stand. "What I think the movie does beautifully is capture the fear and anxiety that comes with hooking up that every gay man can relate to." Under the name Brenden Gregory, he appeared in Interior. Leather Bar., a docufiction film directed by James Franco and Travis Mathews. He also appeared in Mathews' 2010 short film I Want Your Love, but not in its 2012 feature film adaptation.
