= Divaldo Franco =

Brazilian spiritualist (1927–2025)

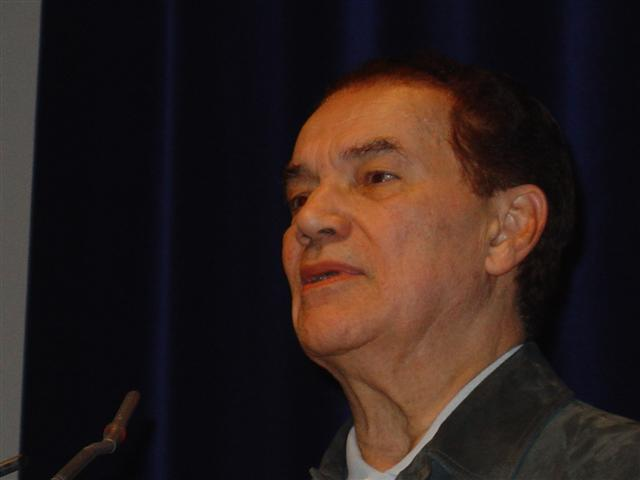
- Born: Divaldo Pereira Franco; May 5, 1927; Feira de Santana, Bahia, Brazil
- Died: May 13, 2025 (aged 98); Salvador, Bahia, Brazil
- Occupation: Medium

Divaldo Pereira Franco (May 5, 1927 – May 13, 2025) was a Brazilian spiritist speaker and medium. In 1952, he founded the charity Mansão do Caminho in Salvador, Bahia, which serves and shelters thousands of people, hundreds of whom are registered as children of the medium. The copyrights of his psychographed books were donated to this and other philanthropic institutions. He was nicknamed the "Paul of Tarsus of spiritism" for his work in spreading the spiritist doctrine.

== Biography ==
Divaldo Pereira Franco was born in Feira de Santana, Bahia on May 5, 1927. Since he was a child, he already showed signs of mediumship, being reprimanded by his father and older brothers, who considered it to be something demonic. He managed to convince his mother when he reported that he saw the spirit of his deceased grandmother to his aunt. His sister Nair committed suicide in 1939, and he saw his sister's spirit begging for help. Her spirit reincarnated as the daughter of a poor woman who came to the Mansão do Caminho, in fragile health, was taken in by her brother and died as a child.

Divaldo Franco was introduced to the Spiritist doctrine when he was supposedly cured of paralysis by a medium. The medium identified his strong mediumship and, under her influence, moved to Salvador in 1945. In this city he founded the Centro Espírita Caminho da Redenção, which would become the Mansão do Caminho ("Mansion of the Way") in 1952.

A large part of her psychographed works are attributed to a spirit called Joanna de Ângelis, who, according to Divaldo, lived as Joanna, wife of Chusa, Clare of Assisi, Juana Inés de la Cruz and Joana Angélica. In 1964, Joanna de Ângelis selected several of her messages and compiled them into a book, which received the suggestive title Messe de Amor ("Harvest of Love"). It was the first book that Divaldo Franco published. In his more than 250 published books, 211 alleged spiritual authors are presented, in addition to Joanna de Ângelis, among them, Victor Hugo, Rabindranath Tagore, and Bezerra de Menezes. The books encompass a wide variety of literary studies in prose, novels and narratives, covering philosophical, doctrinal, historical, children's, psychological and psychiatric themes.

He was awarded the Order of Rio Branco in 2022 and was criticized by part of the spiritist movement for his approach to Jair Bolsonaro and his criticism of gender ideology, calling it a "social hallucination created by cultural Marxism to enslave society". However, he was defended by spiritist leaders and scholars, who stated that the medium has the right to express himself as he wishes, without this characterizing the exclusive vision of the doctrine of the spirits.

He was portrayed by Bruno Garcia and Ghilherme Lobo in the 2019 Brazilian biographical film Divaldo: O Mensageiro da Paz.

Franco died from multiple organ failure in Salvador, on May 13, 2025, at the age of 98. He had been battling bladder cancer from November 2024.

== Books about Divaldo Franco ==
- "Divaldo, médium ou gênio?" – by journalist Fernando Pinto, 1976, 160 pages;
- "Moldando o Terceiro Milênio – Life and work of Divaldo Pereira Franco" – By journalist Fernando Worm;
- "O Semeador de Estrelas" – By Suely Caldas Schubert – Stories about Divaldo's life;
- "Viagens e entrevistas" – By Yvon Luz – Different interviews with Divaldo.

== Books by Divaldo Franco translated to English ==
- Child of God (1986; ISBN 9781953672827, OL 49786298M)
- Recipes for Peace (1996)
- Self-Discovery: An Inner Search (2005)
- Living and Loving (Audio CD – 2005)
- The Dynamics of Our Sixth Sense (2006)
- Obsession (1979)
- I Love Myself, I Am Addiction-free: Spiritual Tools to Fight Addiction (2005)
- The New Generation: The Spiritist View on Indigo and Crystal Children with Vanessa Anseloni (2007)
- Open Your Heart and Find Happiness (2006)
- Therapeutic Visualizations (Audio CD – 2005)
- Understanding Spiritual and Mental Health (2005)
