= Discreet (film) =

2017 film

- Film poster
- Directed by: Travis Mathews
- Written by: Travis Mathews
- Starring: Jonny Mars
- Release date: February 11, 2017 (Berlin)
- Running time: 80 minutes
- Country: United States
- Language: English

Discreet is a 2017 American drama film directed by Travis Mathews and starring Jonny Mars. It was screened in the Panorama section at the 67th Berlin International Film Festival.

== Plot ==
Mandy seeks vibrational peace through making online videos. Alex lives in a van and follows her online, making his own videos. On a visit to his mother he learns that John, the man who abused him as a child, is still alive.

Alex finds the now feeble and mute John and begins to care for him. He has a phone relationship with Mandy but she soon puts an end to it. His lover with whom he acts as a sex slave rejects him.

After spending the night with John in his arms, Alex leads him to the river - the site of his molestation - and kills him.

== Cast ==
- Jonny Mars as Alex
- Atsuko Okatsuka as Mandy
- Joy Cunningham as Sharon
- Jordan Elsass as Zach
- João Federici as Miguel
- Ed Hattaway as Lyel
