= I Want Your Love (film) =

I Want Your Love (2010)
- 2010 short film (Chinese promotional poster)
- Directed by: Travis Mathews
- Written by: Travis Mathews
- Produced by: Jack J. Shamama; Michael Keith; Christopher Nana
- Starring: Jesse Metzger; Brenden Gregory
- Cinematography: Michael Keith; Travis Mathews
- Edited by: Travis Mathews
- Music by: Eddie Foronda
- Release date: April 12, 2010 (short)
- Running time: 14 minutes (short)
- Country: United States
- Language: English

I Want Your Love (2012)
- Theatrical release poster
- Directed by: Travis Mathews
- Written by: Travis Mathews
- Produced by: Jack J. Shamama; Michael Keith; Christopher Nana
- Starring: Jesse Metzger; Brontez Purnell; Ben Jasper; Keith McDonald; Jorge Rodolfo; Ferrin Solano
- Cinematography: Michael Keith; Travis Mathews
- Edited by: Travis Mathews
- Music by: Eddie Foronda
- Release dates: April 12, 2012 (Fringe Film Festival); May 13, 2013 (United States)
- Running time: 71 minutes
- Country: United States
- Language: English
- Budget: $80,000

I Want Your Love is the title of both a 2010 short film and a 2012 feature-length film. Both films were directed and written by Travis Mathews. The drama films both revolve around the friends and ex-lovers of Jesse Metzger, a gay man in his mid-30s who is forced to move back to his hometown from San Francisco due to financial reasons.

The actors' own names, along with much of their real-life stories, were used for their characters in both films, which features graphic sexual scenes. The production of both films was aided by the gay pornographic studio NakedSword. This led to the full-length film being refused exemption from classification, which would have allowed it to screen at the Melbourne Queer Film Festival, a decision to which actor James Franco (who invited Mathews to collaborate on Franco's film Interior. Leather Bar.) reacted negatively.

== 2010 short film ==
=== Cast ===
- Jesse Metzger as Jesse
- Brenden Gregory as Brenden

=== Plot ===
Jesse and Brenden playfully negotiate their way toward having sex together for the first time on Metzger's last night in San Francisco before he returns to the Midwest.

== 2012 film ==
=== Cast ===
- Jesse Metzger as Jesse: a performance-arts director and the main character, who's forced to move back to his hometown
- Brontez Purnell as Brontez: a friend of Jesse, who works at a clothing shop
- Ben Jasper as Ben: Jesse's ex-boyfriend, who works in advertising and stops by to say goodbye
- Keith McDonald as Keith: Jesse's friend and roommate
- Wayne Bumb as Wayne
- Ferrin Solano as Ferrin: Wayne's boyfriend, who moves in with Wayne
- Jorge Rodolfo as Jorge: Wayne's friend, of whom Ferrin is initially jealous, but who eventually joins Wayne and Ferrin for a threesome
- Peter Knegt as Peter: Jesse's one-night stand

;Others

- Shannon O'Malley as Shannon
- Courtney Trouble as Courtney
- Bob Mathews as Jesse's Dad (voice)
- Justin Time as Boy Outside of Aunt Charlie's
- Mike Ojeda as Boy Outside of Aunt Charlie's
- Ginno Castro as Party Person
- Ryan Crowder as Party Person

=== Plot ===
Jesse Metzger, a gay man in his mid-30s who works in the domain of performance arts, finds himself forced to move back to his hometown because he can no longer afford living in San Francisco. As he plans his move, his best friend Wayne is having his boyfriend Ferrin move in. The two have trouble acclimating through the movie, and Ferrin is worried about Wayne's increasing interest in Jorge, a friend of Wayne.

Jesse discusses his fears about moving with his other roommate, Keith, who seems to always help Jesse by saying the right things. Meanwhile, Jesse is having trouble with his job, which involves creativity, a quality he is losing under all the pressure. He contacts his ex-boyfriend Ben to say goodbye. Ben is excited, and goes shopping to impress Jesse, where he meets with friend Brontez. The two chat and agree to meet in a goodbye party for Jesse, which Wayne had planned for later that night. Jesse, despite having reminisced his love-making with Ben, and Ben feel good about meeting each other, but upon meeting, they both realize their feelings are gone. Later that day, Ben calls Brontez to confirm seeing him later at night in Jesse's party.

At the party, Jesse does not show up and stays downstairs with Keith, who is leaving for the weekend. The guests arrive. Ferrin suggests a threesome with Wayne and Jorge, to which they both agree. During the sex, Jorge leaves the two lovers. Meanwhile, Ben and Brontez flirt and eventually have sex. Downstairs, Jesse wears Keith's clothes and lays down listening to music. Keith shows up, surprising Jesse. The two chat until their sexual tension reaches the point where they have sex, which is interrupted by Jesse, who tells Keith that this "isn't what he wants."

In the morning, Ben picks up Jesse. On their way to the airport, Jesse laughs loudly, claiming he is, despite his fears, strangely excited.

== Production ==
I Want Your Love is about gay relationships among a group of San Francisco friends. The short film was released in April 2010, with the cooperation of NakedSword, a gay porn studio, and proceeded to be shown at a number of LGBT film festivals around the world. The full-length film was shown at a number of LGBT film festivals in 2012.

== Restriction in Australia ==
The Australian Classification Board denied I Want Your Love festival exemption for the Sydney Mardi Gras Film Festival. The move has been controversial, with critics highlighting the fact that Donkey Love, a documentary about zoophilia in Colombia, was permitted to screen at the Sydney Underground Film Festival. In 2013, actor James Franco spoke out in defense of the film, stating that the refusal to grant a festival exemption to the film was "hypocritical" and "an embarrassment".
