= Tess Amorim =

Brazilian actress (born 1994)

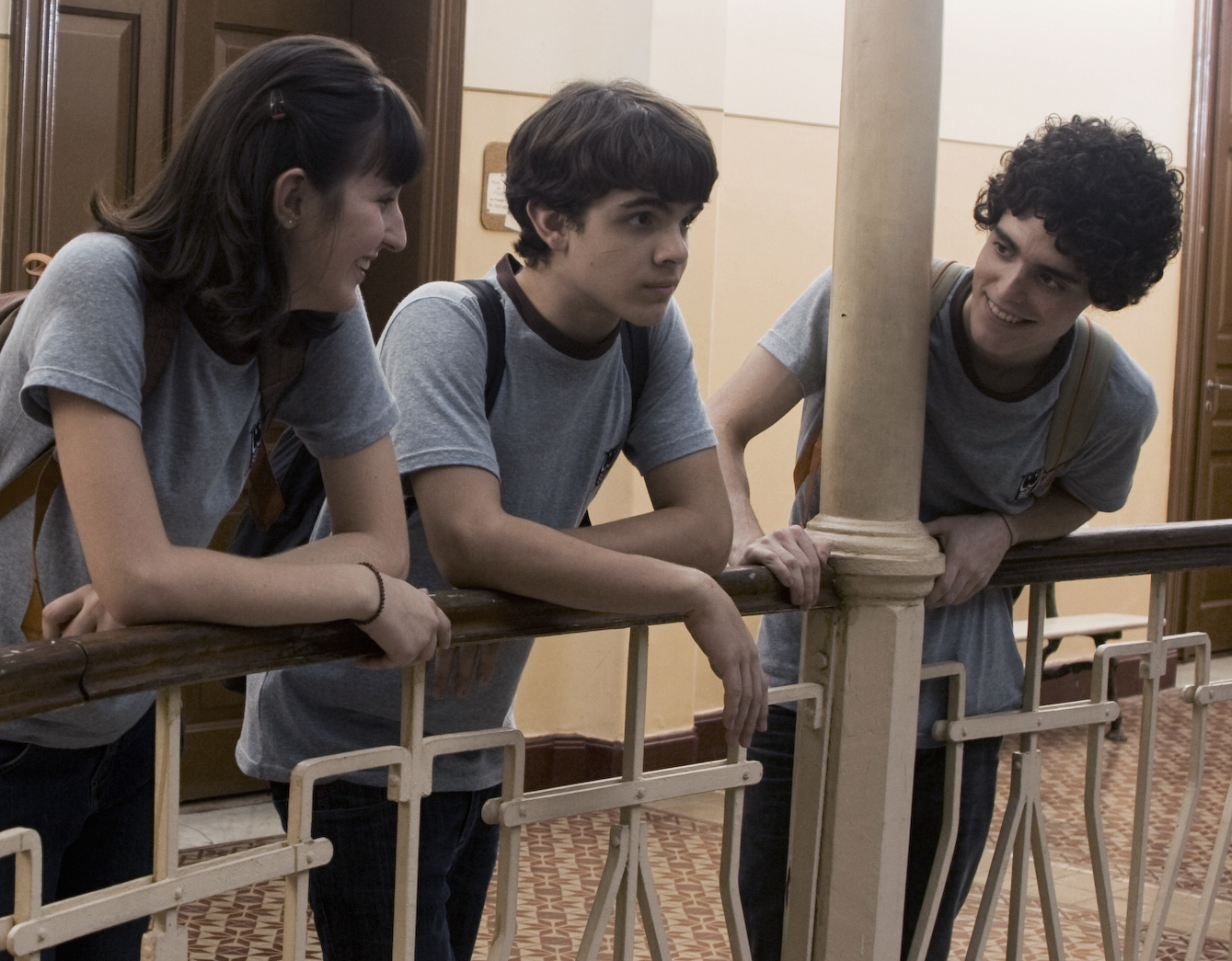
- from Eu Não Quero Voltar Sozinho
- Born: Tess Amorim Coelho; September 15, 1994 (age 31); São Paulo, Brazil
- Occupation: Actress
- Years active: 2007–present

Tess Amorim Coelho (born September 15, 1994) is a Brazilian actress. She is best known for the short film Eu Não Quero Voltar Sozinho and the film Hoje Eu Quero Voltar Sozinho, in which she played Giovana.

== Filmography ==
Film
Year	Title	Role	Notes
2007	Espalhadas Pelo Ar		Short film
2010	Eu Não Quero Voltar Sozinho	Giovana	Short film
2014	Hoje Eu Quero Voltar Sozinho	Giovana	

Television
Year	Title	Role	Notes
2015–2019	SOS Fada Manu	Valquíria	Voice
2016-2018	Sou Luna	Yamila "Yam" Sánchez	Second voice

Video-Games
Year	Title	Role	Notes
2018	Detroit Become Human	Grace	Voice

== Awards and nominations ==
Year	Award	Category	Work	Results	References
2010	National Film Festival of Sexual Diversity	Best Actress	Eu Não Quero Voltar Sozinho	Won	
2010	Atibaia International Audiovisual Festival (Sapuari Trophy)	Best Actress	Eu Não Quero Voltar Sozinho	Won	
