= Interior. Leather Bar. =

- Film poster
- Directed by: James Franco; Travis Mathews
- Screenplay by: Travis Mathews
- Produced by: James Franco; Vince Jolivette; Michael Lannan; Travis Mathews; Iris Torres
- Starring: James Franco; Travis Mathews; Val Lauren; Christian Patrick; Brenden Gregory; Brad Roberge; Colin Chavez; A.J. Goodrich
- Cinematography: Samantha Barrows; Seana Carroll; James Franco; Travis Mathews; Keith Wilson
- Edited by: Travis Mathews
- Music by: Santiago Latorre
- Distributed by: Strand Releasing; Peccadillo Pictures
- Release dates: January 19, 2013 (Sundance Film Festival); January 2, 2014 (United States)
- Running time: 60 minutes
- Country: United States
- Language: English
- Box office: $11,142

Interior. Leather Bar. is a 2013 American docufiction film, which premiered at the 2013 Sundance Film Festival. Directed by James Franco and Travis Mathews, the film stars Franco and Mathews as themselves working on a film project which reimagines and attempts to recreate the 40 minutes of deleted and lost sexually explicit footage from the controversial 1980 film Cruising. The film's cast also includes Val Lauren, Christian Patrick, Brenden Gregory, Brad Roberge, Colin Chavez, Michael Lannan and A.J. Goodrich.

== Background ==
Despite early media reports when the project was first announced, the film is not itself a recreation of the deleted footage, featuring only brief scenes that actually do so literally. Instead, it uses the idea of recreating the footage as a plot point to explore the creative and ethical questions arising from the process of trying to make such a film. It depicts issues such as the actors' level of comfort or discomfort with the material, the conflict between creative freedom and censorship, and the ways in which the cinematic representation of LGBT issues and people has evolved since Cruising was originally released in 1980. One of the main narrative threads of the film is the confusion of several participants over why James Franco would want to be involved in such a project in the first place.

Mathews has stated in interviews that one aspect of the original film's production that interested him was the contrast between analyses which suggest that the deleted footage constituted homophobic propaganda, and those which suggest that it was more documentary in nature.

== Reception ==
Interior. Leather Bar has an approval rating of 59% on review aggregator website Rotten Tomatoes, based on 37 reviews. Metacritic assigned the film a weighted average score of 47 out of 100, based on 15 critics, indicating "mixed or average" reviews.

== See also ==
- List of docufiction films
