= Nicholas Downs =

American actor

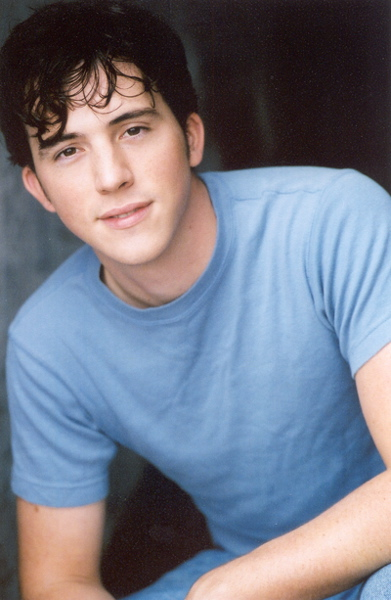
- Born: March 19, 1976 (age 49); Des Moines, Iowa
- Occupation: Actor
- Years active: 1996–present
- Website: www.nicholasdowns.com

Nicholas William Downs is an American actor. Downs has played supporting roles in several films, including Constantine (2005), The Girl Next Door (2004), and Pearl Harbor (2001). He played the main character in "Is It Just Me?" (2010). He also appeared in 16 to Life (2009) and Anderson's Cross (2007). On television, Downs has appeared in episodes of Cold Case (2007) and Boston Public (2002).

== Personal life ==
Downs is gay.

== Filmography ==
Genre	Year	Title	Role	Episodes	Notes
TV film	1996	Harvest of Fire	Son of Zook		uncredited
Film	2001	Circuit	Overdosing Circuit Boy		
TV series	2001	The Guardian	Wall Guy	"The Men from the Boys"	
Film	2001	Pearl Harbor	Terrified Sailor		
TV series	2002	Boston Public	Mike Hoover	"Chapter Thirty-Five"	
Short film	2002	The Shield	Jonathan		12 minutes
Film	2003	Going Down	Michael		
Short film	2003	Gravity	Timothy		
Film	2004	The Girl Next Door	Bob in 70's Sex-Ed Film		
Film	2005	Constantine	Church Attendant		
Film	2006	The Holiday	Peter		uncredited
Film	2006	Nibbles & Byts	Jared		
Short film	2007	Orion Slave Girls Must Die!!!	Jules		24 minutes
TV series	2007	Cold Case	Dylan Noakes '94	"Thrill Kill"	
Film	2008	Real Fear	Jared		
Film	2008	The Awakening of Spring	Eugene		
TV film	2009	The Venice Beach Hostel	Road Weary Teen		30 minutes
Film	2009	16 to Life	Bobby		
Film	2010	Anderson's Cross	Kevin Daniels		
Film	2010	Is It Just Me?	Blaine		
TV series	2010	The Young and the Restless	Theater Employee	"Episode #1.9341"	
Film	2011	The Apocalypse According to Doris	Mike		
TV series	2011	Make It or Break It	Denver 18 Rep	"The New Normal"	
TV series	2012	Castle	Marcus O'Neill	"Once Upon a Crime"	
Short film	2012	Homecoming	Ollie		14 minutes
Short film	2012	Elevator Pitch	Holiday Killer		3 minutes
Film	2012	Popcorn Ceiling	Neville		
TV series	2012–2014	Sloppy Tacos	Nicky		10 episodes
TV film	2013	2cool 4school	Mickey		
TV series	2013	NCIS: Los Angeles	Bellman	"Raven & the Swans"	1 episode
TV film	2015	Beautiful & Twisted	Bank Teller		
TV series	2015	Coffee House Chronicles	Dan	"Jail Bait"	1 episode
TV series	2016	A Cappella	Gustavo		3 episodes
Film	2017	Actors Anonymous	Thomas		
Short film	2017	The Contest	Christopher Whitman		
Film	2017	Vikes	Newsman		
Film	2017	Rio	Thomas		
Film	2018	Bonds of Redemption	Bobby		
Short film	2019	The Handyman	Walter Middleton	Actor/Writer	
Short film	2020	Zach King's Day Off	Abe Froman		
Film	2020	Night in the Garden of Eve	Zac		
