= Ghilherme Lobo =

Brazilian actor (born 1995)

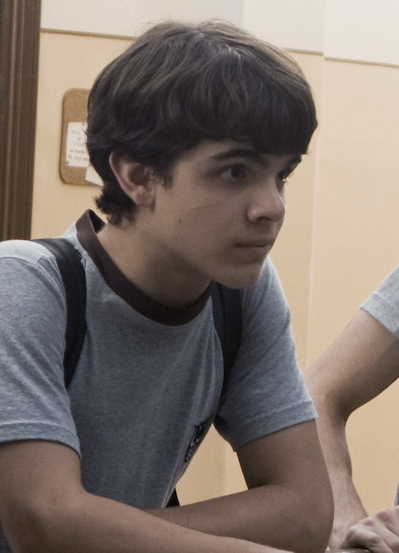
- Lobo in the film I Don't Want to Go Back Alone in 2010
- Born: Ghilherme Lobo Putini; 8 February 1995 (age 30); São Paulo, Brazil
- Occupation: Actor
- Years active: 2010–present
- Spouse: Arianna Contini (m. 2020)

Ghilherme Lobo Putini (born 8 February 1995) is a Brazilian actor. He is best known for the short film I Don't Want to Go Back Alone and the film The Way He Looks, in which he played Leo, a blind, gay teenage boy.

== Biography ==
Ghilherme has six siblings and comes from an artistic family: his father is a musician and his mother is a singer. His artistic training comes from dance. He began dancing at age eight with Ballet Stagium in São Paulo. He moved to the Cisne Negro Companhia de Dança, where he remained until age 13.

== Filmography ==
Film
| Year | Title | Role | Notes |
|---|---|---|---|
| 2010 | I Don't Want to Go Back Alone | Leonardo | Short film |
| 2013 | O Perfil de Jonas Aquino | Pedro | Short film |
| 2014 | The Way He Looks | Leonardo | |
| 2018 | Bia (2.0) | Palhaço Abraço | Filming |
| 2019 | Divaldo: O Mensageiro da Paz | Divaldo Franco (young) | |

Television
| Year | Title | Role | Notes |
|---|---|---|---|
| 2015 | Felizes para Sempre? | Dionísio Drummond (young) | Special guest |
| 2015 | Sete Vidas | Bernardo Figueira Meira | Lead role |
| 2016 | Ligações Perigosas | Augusto de Valmont (young) | Lead role |
| 2018-19 | Malhação: Vidas Brasileiras | Luís | |
