= I Don't Want to Go Back Alone =

2010 short film directed by Daniel Ribeiro

- Directed by: Daniel Ribeiro
- Written by: Daniel Ribeiro
- Produced by: Diana Almeida; Daniel Ribeiro
- Cinematography: Pierre de Kerchove
- Edited by: Cristian Chinen
- Music by: Juliano Polimeno; Tatá Aeroplano
- Production company: Lacuna Films
- Release date: July 18, 2010 (Paulínia Film Festival)
- Running time: 17 minutes
- Country: Brazil
- Language: Portuguese
- Budget: BRL 80,000

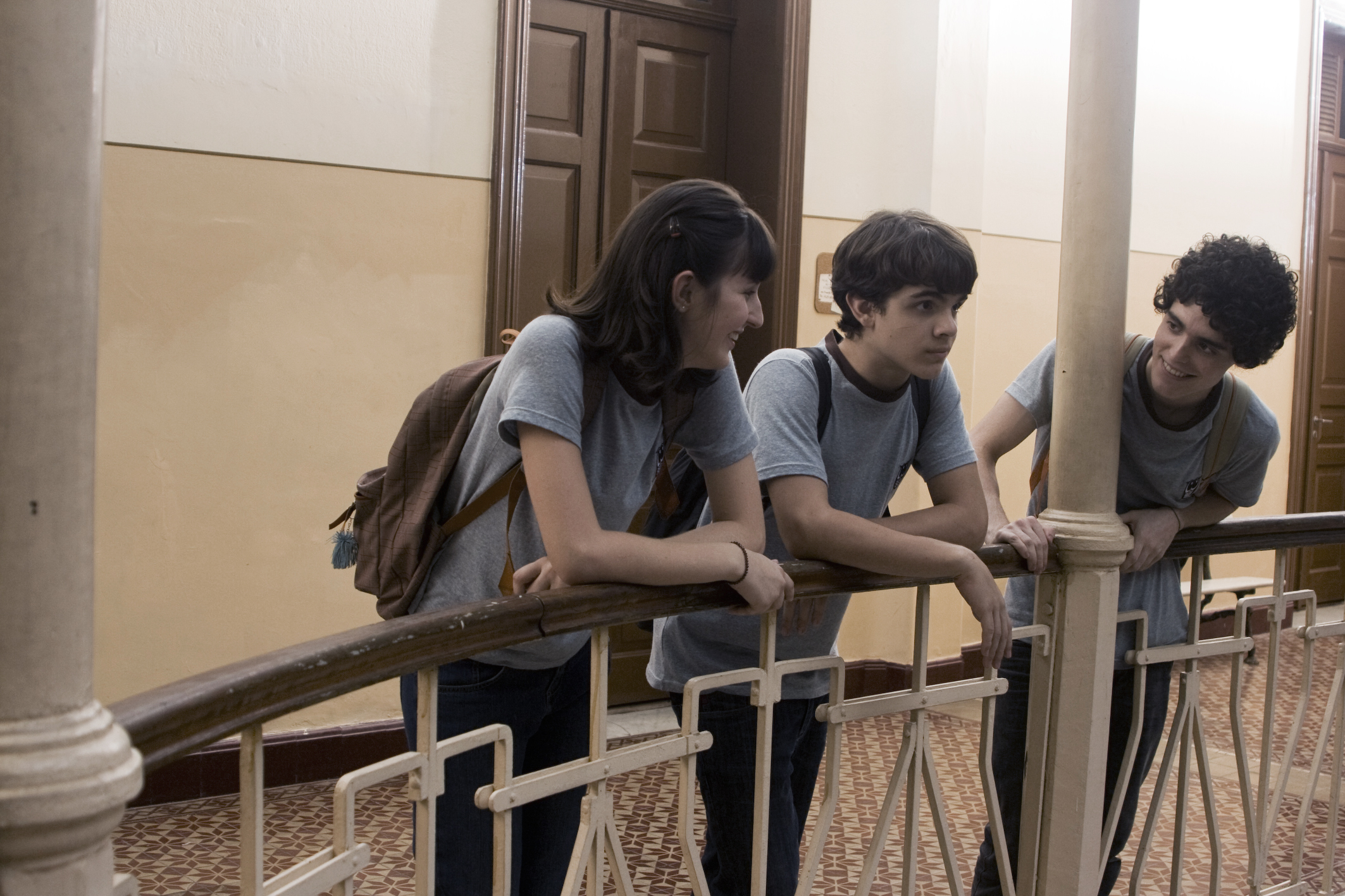
Giovana, Leonardo and Gabriel in Eu Não Quero Voltar Sozinho

I Don't Want to Go Back Alone (Portuguese: Eu Não Quero Voltar Sozinho) is a 2010 Brazilian short film directed by Daniel Ribeiro. The short won the 2011 Iris Prize.

It was later expanded into Ribeiro's 2014 feature film The Way He Looks.

== Plot ==
Leonardo "Leo" is a 15-year-old blind high school student with his one friend in class, Giovana, sitting next to him. Seated behind Leonardo is the new student Gabriel. After class, Giovana invites Gabriel to walk home with herself and Leonardo; she customarily links arms with him for support even though his house is farther from the school than hers. Later, Giovana teases Leonardo about never confiding in her about romance and suggests he receive math tutoring from Gabriel.

Over time the three grow closer, walking home and playing games together. Leonardo becomes more self-conscious about appearance, asking questions about what he and Gabriel look like. Gabriel volunteers to take over escorting Leonardo so Giovana does not have to backtrack, though she possessively says that is not necessary. However, Leo happily agrees. A school project requires same-sex pairs, leading Leonardo to work with Gabriel instead of Giovana. During a more serious conversation about his blindness, Gabriel points out Giovana's attraction to Leonardo, but Leonardo says he does not reciprocate. After school one day, Leo links arms with Gabriel rather than Giovana, much to Gabriel's surprise and Giovana's chagrin.

When they arrive at his house, Leonardo changes shirts in front of Gabriel, who is stunned before removing his own sweatshirt. Gabriel asks Leonardo where the bathroom is to brush his teeth, but Gabriel is standing in the doorway and sees Leonardo smelling his sweatshirt. However, he does not mention this to Leo. The next day in class, Gabriel tells Leonardo he left his sweatshirt at Leonardo's house but must leave school early for a dentist's appointment, and so will collect it the next day. After the other students have left, Leonardo admits to Giovana he is in love with Gabriel.

Doubtful about the homosexual romance—and hurt because she has feelings for Leo as Gabriel suspected—Giovana does not provide a positive response before a sudden phone call summons her to her grandmother's birthday, leaving Leonardo to walk home alone with a white cane. At home, when he hears someone come into his room, he chastises Giovana for leaving him and expresses his doubts about confessing his love for Gabriel. However, the visitor is actually Gabriel himself, who smiles to himself at this unintended confession before silently kissing him on the lips, leaving with his sweatshirt. Later, Giovana arrives while apologizing for taking so long. Leonardo is left confused and, after feeling around his room, discovers the sweatshirt is gone. He smiles at the realization that Gabriel was the one who kissed him.

== Cast ==
- Ghilherme Lobo as Leonardo
- Fabio Audi as Gabriel
- Tess Amorim as Giovana

== Awards and accolades ==
Film Festival	Category	Year	Outcome
Outfest	Outstanding Dramatic Short Film	2011	Won
Iris Prize Festival	Iris Prize	2011	Won
Cork Film Festival	OutLook Award for Best LGBT Short Film	2011	Won
Reel Affirmations	Best Male Short	2011	Won

== Feature film ==
In December 2012, the film's official Twitter announced that a feature film based on the short film, titled Todas as Coisas mais Simples, which translates to "All of the Simplest Things", was in production, after over two years of fundraising and preparation of the script. Filming began and completed in early 2013. The film premiered in 2014.

In September 2013, director Daniel Ribeiro announced the final title would be Hoje Eu Quero Voltar Sozinho, which translates to "Today I Want to Go Back Alone". Ribeiro reported, "Throughout the development of the movie a new plot element arose: Leonardo's independence. It's a naturally common theme in any teen's life, but specially in Leonardo's as, being blind, he's often overprotected by those around him, and he wants to do some things on his own, without depending on others. Therefore, the original title was no longer valid, after all "going back alone" became one of the main character's objectives."

The official English title of the film is The Way He Looks.
