= Is It Just Me? (film) =

- Film poster
- Directed by: J.C Calciano
- Written by: J.C Calciano
- Produced by: Michael Amato
- Starring: Nicholas Downs; David Loren; Adam Huss
- Edited by: Cynthia Ludwig
- Music by: Christopher Farrell
- Production companies: Whitestone Acquisitions; Cinema 175
- Distributed by: TLA Releasing
- Release dates: January 2010 (Palm Springs); October 1, 2010 (New York)
- Running time: 93 minutes
- Country: United States
- Language: English

Is It Just Me? is an American gay-themed film, written and directed by J.C Calciano and released in 2010, in which a socially shunned columnist makes a romantic match online. In doing so, he accidentally messages under the wrong account that forwards his roommate's photo, rather than his own, creating an identity mix-up.

== Plot ==
Is It Just Me? is a gay-themed film written and directed by J.C Calcino. The story focuses on the life of a young man, Blaine (Nicholas Downs), as he searches for true love. Fortune befalls him when Xander, (David Loren), a soft-spoken Texan musician who he meets online, shows interest in him. However, Blaine soon realizes that this is not the perfect situation that he thought it was when it is revealed that he had accidentally used his more athletic roommate's online account to talk to Xander. Cameron (Adam Huss), his roommate and a go-go dancer, agrees to pose as Blaine on a date with Xander. Their friendship is pushed to its limits by Blaine as he asks many absurd favors from his friend in order to keep up the lie. The effects of a low self-esteem are apparent in Blaine's life as he is unsure of himself, to the extent of meeting dates through online profiles, but is forced to face them in the end.

== Cast ==
- Nicholas Downs as Blaine
- David Loren as Xander
- Adam Huss as Cameron
- Michelle Laurent as Michelle
- Michael Donahue as Antonio
- Bob Rumnock as Bob
- Bruce Gray as Ernie
- Christopher King as Frontier Model
- Keith Roenke as Barista
- Christopher Tisa as Coffee Patron (billed as Chris Tisa)
- Brian Schulze as Cameron's Friend
- Bryce Blais as Drew
- Jed Bernard as Pool Shark
- Brody Kramer as Man in bed
- Michael Hennessy as Bartender #1
- Alisa Berhorst as Bartender #2 (billed as Alisa J. Campbell)
- Jeremiah Dupre as Bartender #3
- Sam Wickham as Jogger
- Gabriel Coble as Neighbor #1
- Derek Soldenski as Neighbor #2
- Beau Nelson as Club Kid
- Paul A. Becker as GoGo Dancer #1
- Michael Elepterakis as GoGo Dancer #2
- Oskar Rodriguez as GoGo Dancer #3
- Brandon David Wright as GoGo Dancer #4 (billed as Brandon Wright)
- Bijoux as Donatella

== Production ==
Is It Just Me? is the first film by writer/director JC Calciano, whose film credits include a 1996 associate producer credit for Impossible. Calciano also served as the former head of production for Tom Cruise's Cruise/Wagner Productions at [Paramount Pictures], as well as running the new media division of Melanie Griffith's One World Networks.

With "Is It Just Me," Calciano intended the story to follow the formula of a 21st-century romantic comedy that would be entertaining to all viewers, regardless of the main character's sexual orientation. It was also based on the desire to pull from his own 11-plus year committed relationship to his partner, that would highlight some of the lessons learned that he felt were worth sharing, by expressing insights into the connections between that affect each other's lives, while focusing on the positive aspects of gay relationships.

== Awards ==
"Is It Just Me?" was the recipient of the 2010 Rainbow Award, in the Narrative Feature Film category, for the 2010 Honolulu Rainbow Film Festival .
