= Travis Mathews =

American director and screenwriter (born 1975)

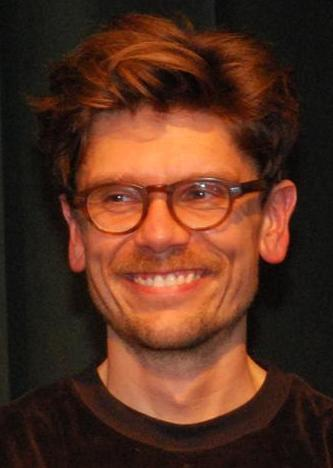
Mathews in 2013

Travis Mathews (born 1975) is an American director and screenwriter. Primarily working within the documentary genre, his credits include the films I Want Your Love, Interior. Leather Bar. and Discreet, and the web series In Their Room.

Mathews lives and works in San Francisco.

== Selected filmography ==
- Discreet (2017)
