= You, Me and Him (2007 film) =

2007 film directed by Daniel Ribeiro

- Theatrical release poster
- Directed by: Daniel Ribeiro
- Written by: Daniel Ribeiro
- Produced by: Diana Almeida
- Starring: Daniel Tavares; Diego Torraca; Eduardo Melo
- Cinematography: Pierre de Kerchove
- Edited by: Rafael Gomes
- Music by: Thiago Chasseraux
- Distributed by: Lacuna Filmes
- Release date: November 22, 2007 (Festival de Cinema de Brasília)
- Running time: 18 minutes
- Country: Brazil
- Language: Portuguese

You, Me and Him (Portuguese: Café com Leite; tr. Coffee with Milk) is a 2007 Brazilian short film written and directed by Brazilian director Daniel Ribeiro. The film has won many awards including the Crystal Bear for best short film at the 2008 Berlin International Film Festival.

== Plot ==
Danilo (Daniel Tavares) is about to move out of his parents' house to go live with his boyfriend, Marcos (Diego Torraca), when his parents die unexpectedly in an accident. His plans for the future change and he becomes responsible for his 10‑year-old brother, Lucas (Eduardo Melo).

New bonds are created between these three young men. While brothers Danilo and Lucas need to learn everything they did not know about each other, Marcos tries to find out if there is a place for him in his boyfriend's new family arrangement. In between video games, glasses of milk, pain and disappointment, they all need to learn how to live together.

== Cast ==
- Daniel Tavares as "Danilo"
- Diego Torraca as "Marcos"
- Eduardo Melo as "Lucas"

== Festivals and accolades ==
=== Brazil ===
- 40º Festival de Brasília do Cinema Brasileiro
- 5º Festival de Cinema de Campo Grande
- 11ª Mostra de Cinema de Tiradentes
- Cine PE 2008–Festival do Audiovisual
- 15º Festival de Cinema e Vídeo de Cuiabá
  - Award: Best Director
- 5º Festival de Cinema de Maringá
- CINEME-SE 2008–Festival da Experiência do Cinema
- 12º Florianópolis Audiovisual Mercosul - FAM 2008
  - Award: VIVO Audiovisual - Melhor Curta Metragem
- 31º Festival Guarnicê de Cinema
- 1º Festival Paulínia de Cinema
  - Award: Best Director
  - Award: Best Actor - Eduardo Melo
- Festival de Cinema Agulhas Negras 2008
- 19° Festival Internacional de Curtas-Metragens de São Paulo
  - TOP 10 - Escolha do Público
  - Award: Moviemobz
- Comunicurtas 2008 - Festival de Cinema de Campina Grande
  - Award: Best Short Film
  - Award: Best Short Ficcion
  - Award: Best Director
  - Award: Best Screenplay
  - Award: Best Actor - Daniel Tavares
- II For Rainbow
  - Award: Actor - Eduardo Melo
- 6º Curta Santos
  - Award: Best Director
- Festival do Rio 2008
- 9º Festival de Penedo
- 8ª Goiânia Mostra Curtas

=== International ===
- 58th Berlin International Film Festival– Germany
  - Winner: Crystal Bear for Best Short Film (Generation 14plus)
- 48º Festival Internacional de Cine y TV de Cartagena–Colombia
  - Special mention
- 22º Festival Internacional de Cinema em Guadalajara–Mexico
- 26º Festival Cinematográfico Internacional del Uruguay
- 20º Rencontres Cinémas d'Amérique Latine de Toulouse - France
- 15º Festival Internacional de Jóvenes Realizadores de Granada - Spain
- 21ª Semana de Cine de Medina del Campo - Spain
- 23rd Torino GLBT Film Festival–Italy
  - Winner: Best Short Film- Audience award
- 24th Schwulen Filmwoche - Germany
- 11th Pink Apple– Switzerland
- Inside Out Film and Video Festival–Canada
- 12th Brazilian Film Festival of Miami– United States
  - Winner: Best Short Film
- NewFest 2008: New York Lesbian, Gay, Bisexual, & Transgender Film Festival– United States
- 32nd Frameline Film Festival: The San Francisco Int’l LGBT Film Festival– United States
- International Film Festival TOFIFEST - Poland
- Philadelphia Int'l Gay and Lesbian Film Festival - United States
- 4th InDPanda International Short Film Festival - Hong Kong
- 7th Q! Film Festival - Indonesia
- ANONIMUL Int’l Film Festival - Romania
- 2008 Palm Springs Int'l Festival of Short Films - United States
- ShortShorts Mexico
- 17ème Festival de Biarritz Cinémas et Cultures de l'Amerique Latine - France
- Cardiff's International - Iris Prize Festival 2008 - United Kingdom
- Festival de Cinema de Quito - Cero Latitud - Ecuador
- 53rd Corona Cork Film Festival - Ireland
- 27th Uppsala International Short Film Festival - Sweden
- 38th Molodist - Kyiv International Film Festival - Ukraine
- LesGaiCineMad - Spain
- DIVERSA Film Festival - Argentina
