= The Way He Looks =

2014 film by Daniel Ribeiro

- Theatrical release poster
- Portuguese: Hoje Eu Quero Voltar Sozinho
- Directed by: Daniel Ribeiro
- Screenplay by: Daniel Ribeiro
- Based on: I Don't Want to Go Back Alone by Daniel Ribeiro
- Produced by: Daniel Ribeiro; Diana Almeida
- Starring: Ghilherme Lobo; Fábio Audi; Tess Amorim; Lúcia Romano; Eucir de Souza; Selma Egrei
- Cinematography: Pierre de Kerchove
- Edited by: Cristian Chinen
- Production company: Lacuna Filmes
- Distributed by: Vitrine Films
- Release dates: 10 February 2014 (Berlin); 10 April 2014 (Brazil)
- Running time: 96 minutes
- Country: Brazil
- Language: Portuguese
- Budget: R$2.7 million
- Box office: $1.2 million

The Way He Looks (Portuguese: Hoje Eu Quero Voltar Sozinho, lit. 'Today I Want to Go Back Alone') is a 2014 Brazilian coming-of-age romantic drama film written and directed by Daniel Ribeiro, based on his 2010 short film I Don't Want to Go Back Alone (Eu Não Quero Voltar Sozinho). The film stars Ghilherme Lobo, Fábio Audi, and Tess Amorim, reprising their roles from the short.

The Way He Looks premiered in the Panorama section of the 64th Berlin International Film Festival in February 2014. It was released theatrically in Brazil on 10 April 2014. The film was met with positive reviews from critics and audiences; both groups praised Lobo, Audi, and Amorim's performances, Kerchove's cinematography, the soundtrack, and Ribeiro's direction. It ranked as the 5th most viewed film in the country on its first day of release.

The film won two awards at the 64th Berlin International Film Festival; the FIPRESCI Prize for best feature film in the Panorama section and the Teddy Award for best LGBT-themed feature. It was selected as the Brazilian entry for the Best Foreign Language Film at the 87th Academy Awards, but was not nominated.

== Plot ==
Leonardo, a blind high school student struggling with independence, and his best friend, Giovana, are discussing how they have yet to kiss anyone. Leonardo is especially distressed because he does not believe anyone wants to kiss him. Giovana regularly walks Leonardo home despite living in the opposite direction. At home, Leonardo's mother worries over leaving him home alone. Leonardo insists he will be fine, and his mother agrees under certain terms.

At school, a classmate, Fabio, bullies Leonardo for the sound of his typewriter. A new student, named Gabriel, arrives and takes the empty seat behind Leonardo. Giovana expresses romantic interest in Gabriel, but classmate Karina begins to pursue him. Leonardo and Giovana become friendlier with Gabriel and he joins the pair on their walks home. One day, Leonardo walks home from school alone and Fabio and his friends taunt Leo, causing him to trip and fall. When he arrives home late to his worried parents, he expresses his annoyance over their overprotective nature.

Later on, Leonardo expresses to Giovana his interest in studying abroad as a way to leave his overbearing home life, but admits that he has not told his parents about his plans.

At school, Leonardo and Gabriel pair up for a project. The two go for lunch and then a movie. Working on the project a few days later, Leonardo attempts to teach Gabriel braille, but he finds it impossible; Leonardo remarks that for him, riding a bike is impossible. The boys sneak out one night to watch a lunar eclipse. On the way home, Gabriel realizes he left his sweatshirt at Leonardo's house and asks him to bring it the next day. Later that night, Leonardo goes to bed with Gabriel's sweatshirt on and masturbates.

The exchange agency calls Leonardo about an American agency that specializes in blind students. The project results in Gabriel replacing Giovana as Leonardo's guide home, and she gets angry when they walk home without her one day. They wait for her the following day, but she ignores them.

Leonardo finally confides his interest in going abroad to his parents and they outright disapprove. His father later addresses it privately with Leonardo, understanding Leonardo's interest, but is still not comfortable with it.

The three friends go to a house party hosted by Karina. Giovana avoids Leo, still angry at him, and gets drunk with Gabriel, confessing that she feels he has replaced her in Leo's life and Leo would not miss her if he went abroad. Giovana kisses him, but Gabriel does not reciprocate. While this is happening, Leo reluctantly joins a game of Spin the Bottle. When it lands on Leo, Fabio grabs Karina's dog for Leo to kiss. Giovana drags Leo out before anything happens, but does not tell him what Fabio was going to do. Leo is annoyed at her for what he believes is her interfering, furthering Giovana's anger at him before she leaves. Gabriel comes out after this, insisting that he take Leo home, but Leo expresses his anger at everyone controlling him and not even letting him kiss anyone. Gabriel then kisses him and leaves quickly.

The school goes on a camping trip and Leo sits alone on the bus, with Gabriel next to Karina. Gabriel approaches Leo at the campsite and claims that he was so drunk that he does not remember anything from Karina's party, including the kiss, which Leo does not discuss. Later on, while the class goes swimming at a pool, Gabriel helps Leo apply sunscreen, which Fabio teases them about.

Afterwards, Leo makes Gabriel wait with him at the pool while everybody gets cleaned up in the public showers, thinking that showering with other people is embarrassing. As they shower, Gabriel gazes at Leo's naked body and becomes aroused. He quickly retreats to cover his erection with a towel and sits feeling embarrassed.

That night, Giovana and Leo make up and get drunk together, with Leo eventually admitting that he is in love with Gabriel. Giovana is skeptical at first, but gives her support when they arrive home from the trip, urging Gabriel to go see Leo. Gabriel visits Leo at his house and when Leo asks if he hooked up with Karina, Gabriel admits she attempted to, but he turned her down. Gabriel also confesses that it is Leo he is interested in and does remember their kiss after Karina's party. However, he has doubts about Leo reciprocating these feelings. Leo responds by kissing Gabriel.

Some time later, the two present their project and walk home with Giovana, Leo on Gabriel's arm. Fabio and friends poke fun at the homosexual nature of Leo and Gabriel's relationship, not knowing the truth. Leo changes positions so he is holding hands with Gabriel, much to the shock and chagrin of Fabio's friends. The final scene of the film is Leo riding a bike with Gabriel perched on the back wheel, assisting him.

== Cast ==
- Ghilherme Lobo as Leonardo
- Fábio Audi as Gabriel
- Tess Amorim as Giovana
- Eucir de Souza as Carlos
- Isabela Guasco as Karina
- Selma Egrei as Maria
- Júlio Machado as Professor
- Naruna Costa as Professora
- Lúcia Romano as Laura
- Victor Filgueiras as Guilherme
- Pablo Carvalho as Fabio

== Production ==
The script was selected for the Berlinale Talent Campus - Script Station 2010 and was one of the three projects selected for the Rencontres Jeunes Réalisateurs of the Festival Biarritz Amérique Latine - Cinémas et Cultures (2009).

The film was shot entirely in São Paulo, Brazil.

== Music ==
- Belle & Sebastian: "There's Too Much Love"
- Cícero: "Vagalumes Cegos"
- Arvo Pärt: "Spiegel im Spiegel"
- Franz Schubert: Piano Trio No. 2 in E-flat, D. 929, Op. 100: II. Andante con moto (The Gryphon Trio - Great Piano Trios)
- Marvin Gaye: "Let's Get It On"
- David Bowie: "Modern Love"
- The National: "Start a War"
- Homemade Blockbuster: "Dance Moves"
- Dom La Nena: "Start a War" (The National Cover)
- Tatá Aeroplano and Juliano Polimeno: "Beijo Roubado em Segredo"
- Marcelo Camelo and Mallu Magalhães: "Janta"

== Release ==
The Way He Looks had its world premiere at the Panorama section of the 64th Berlin International Film Festival on 10 February 2014. It was released in Brazil on 10 April 2014.

Peccadillo Pictures acquired the rights to The Way He Looks and released the film theatrically in the UK in November 2014.

== Reception ==
=== Box office ===
In its first week of release in Brazil, the film debuted in 33 screens, and was the fifth most watched film of the week, with an audience of 30,209 people. Overall, the film grossed R$415,000 between Thursday and Sunday in competition with the release of Captain America: The Winter Soldier, which was released in 1,107 screens. Along with the limited premiere sessions that happened in the previous week to the national release, the film was watched by a total of 31,209 people.

=== Critical response ===
The Way He Looks received acclaim from film critics. Review aggregator Rotten Tomatoes reported that 93% of critics have given the film a positive review based on reviews from 43 critics, with an average rating of 7.2/10. The site's critics consensus states: "Compassionate, emotionally detailed, and populated with resonant characters, The Way He Looks leaves a warmth that lingers." Metacritic gave the film a score of 71 out of 100 based on reviews from 16 critics, indicating "generally favorable reviews".

Boyd van Hoeij of The Hollywood Reporter gave the film a positive review, saying that "Ribeiro has impressively fleshed out the material into a full narrative, with not only added conflict and a convincing gallery of supporting characters but also an entirely new focus on the quest for independence of the blind lead." Jay Weissber of the Variety remarked "Daniel Ribeiro's gay coming-of-age debut has an undeniable appeal... this is a gay story, done with tenderness and capturing the hesitancy of expressing affection when rejection can have ugly consequences."

Roger Walker-Dack writing for Queertiques.com, wrote "There is nothing at all extraordinary in the plot-lines of this wee movie, but somehow it has the most endearing quality that makes it so immensely enjoyable. There is a remarkable innocence to this group of young people who all seem never to have even been kissed, and even the inclusion of Leo's taunting by the bullies in his class has no hint of any real hatred. There are some really nice touches of humor and tenderness, none more so than when Gabriel insists that Leo learns how to dance. What does make it all so compelling is the captivating performances of the three young lead actors, particularly Ghilherme Lobo who was so pitch perfect as the blind boy."

The film also received generally positive reviews from the Brazilian press. Raisa Rossi of Almanaque Virtual gave the film a positive review, saying "Hard not to be moved by such a light and true story, which nullifies any kind of prejudice. The compelling interpretations, especially Ghilherme Lobo as a blind kid, nice and smooth picture soundtrack and right round the merits of the film."

On the Brazilian site Cineclick, reviewer Roberto Guerra cited the film as "Flawless and sensitive under various aspects.... Few films, national or international, treat sexual manifestation of a teenager with much refining and subtlety is in the whole and not only in the construction of the dramatic character arc. Soundtrack, cinematography, editing and supporting cast work in subtle harmony, but always vibrant."

=== Accolades ===
Upon its premiere at the 64th Berlin International Film Festival, The Way He Looks won the FIPRESCI Prize for best feature film in the Panorama section and the Teddy Award for best LGBT-themed feature. It also won the 2nd place award in the Panorama section.

== See also ==
- List of submissions to the 87th Academy Awards for Best Foreign Language Film
- List of Brazilian submissions for the Academy Award for Best Foreign Language Film
