= Stephen Tyrone Williams =

American actor (born 1982)

Stephen Tyrone Williams (born 1982) is an American actor best known for such films and television series as The Knick, Da Sweet Blood of Jesus, Elementary and Phil Spector.

Williams is also a stage actor known for such plays as Athol Fugard's My Children! My Africa! and his Broadway debut, Lucky Guy.

== Filmography ==
=== Film ===
Year	Title	Role	Notes
2009	Crush	Cameron	
2010	Children of God	Romeo Fernander	
2011	Restless City	Kareem	
2012	Greetings from Tim Buckley	Carter	
2014	Da Sweet Blood of Jesus	Dr. Hess Greene	

=== Television ===
Year	Title	Role	Notes
2012	Unforgettable	David Jacobs	Episode: "Blind Alleys"
2013	Phil Spector	Producer	Television film
2013	Conversations w/My Ex	Josh	2 episodes
2013	Person of Interest	Joseph Kent	Episode: "Razgovor"
2013, 2014	Elementary	Randy	2 episodes
2014	The Knick	Dr. Moses Williams	Episode: "Get the Rope"
