= Children of God (2010 film) =

- Directed by: Kareem Mortimer
- Written by: Kareem Mortimer
- Produced by: Trevite Willis; Richard LeMay
- Starring: Johnny Ferro; Margaret Laurena Kemp; Stephen Tyrone Williams; Van Brown; Mark Richard Ford; Craig Pinder
- Cinematography: Ian Bloom
- Edited by: Maria Cataldo
- Music by: Nathan Matthew David
- Release date: March 13, 2010 (Miami Film Festival)
- Running time: 104 minutes
- Country: Bahamas
- Language: English

Children of God is a 2010 Bahamian romantic drama film by director and screenwriter Kareem Mortimer.

It tells the story of two young Bahamian men who fall in love with each other, and it portrays the homophobia of the Bahamian society. The film also deals with themes of homosexual, as a romantic drama film.

It is one of the first feature narratives from the Caribbean to address homosexuality. It was the opening night film of the Bahamas International Film Festival. The Bahamas had banned the film Brokeback Mountain in 2006. The film made its International Premiere at the Miami International Film Festival and has premiered at over 100 film festivals around the world, winning 17 awards. Children of God was named one of the top ten films of 2010 on BET.com.

== Plot ==
White Bahamian painting student Jonny (Johnny Ferro), an awkward obsessive-compulsive, is faced with losing his scholarship at a Nassau university if he does not live up to the potential his professors believe he has. His instructor "banishes" him to the remote island of Eleuthera, to focus on his work and find his artistic voice. But first he finds Romeo (Stephen Tyrone Williams), a handsome, self-confident guy who shows Jonny the scenic spots, and a bit more. Romeo's got a girlfriend, however, as well as a blustery mother who willfully ignores any clue or hint he drops to set her straight.

Lena Mackey (Margaret Laurena Kemp) is an extremely conservative forty-year-old, anti-gay activist who finds out that her pastor husband is not who he represents himself to be. She believes that the only way to fix problems in her life is to limit the rights of homosexuals. She heads to Eleuthera to contemplate her future and to galvanize the community to oppose gay rights. Tired of her husband spouting high-and-mighty, anti-gay rhetoric at rallies while refusing to own up to the cruelty and contradictions in his private life, Lena has a decision to make.

When Jonny arrives, his and Romeo’s paths cross, and together these two embark on a series of physical and emotional adventures that not only inspire Jonny to paint, but also give him a new zest for life. Here he decides to paint his 'masterpiece' and then gets killed by a closeted homosexual when Jonny was en route to meet Romeo. It could have had a happy ending. However, in this film, life does not have happy endings for many gays and lesbians.

The phrase "Children of God" is the religious expression used by Christians to refer to human divinity as being all God's Children. Four Bahamian individuals set out on a journey from the frenetic energy of Nassau to the slower-paced and open Eleuthera. The year is 2004, when the Caribbean world is rocked by the emergence of Rosie O'Donnell's gay family cruise ship. Actual documentary footage details the mass hysteria that divides the Caribbean, as some fundamentalists lead widespread rallies.

== Cast ==
- Johnny Ferro as Jonny Roberts
- Margaret Laurena Kemp as Lena Mackey
- Stephen Tyrone Williams as Romeo Fernander
- Van Brown as Reverend Clyde Ritchie
- Mark Richard Ford as Ralph Mackey
- Craig Pinder as Mike Roberts
- Sylvia Adams as Grammy Rose
- Aijalon Coley as Omar Mackey
- Jay Lance Gotlieb as Angry Driver
- Jason Elwood Hanna as Purple
- Christopher Herrod as Dr. Mark Wells
- Juanita Kelly as Lonnette Adderley
- Adela Osterloh as Romeo's Mother
- Leslie Vanderpool as Rhoda Ritchie
- Christine Wilson as Anna Ross
- Conrad Knowles, Romeo's true friend

== Release ==
Children of God made its International Premiere at the Miami International Film Festival in March 2010. It had a limited theatrical release in May 2011 in New York and Miami. Children of God went on to premiere on the Showtime television network on June 2, 2010, and the DVD was released on June 7 through TLA Releasing.

Johnny Ferro won Best Actor at the Out on Film festival in Atlanta, Georgia, against runner-up James Franco (for Howl).

== Reception ==
New York Times critic Jeannette Catsoulis found the film mediocre, with the characters standing for overly simplistic representatives of the films' ideas. BET.com reviewer Clay Cane gave it a strongly positive review, praising the acting (especially Margaret Laurena Kemp as Lena) and the photography and technical excellence despite its low budget. Variety reviewer Boyd van Hoeij similarly praised its cinematography and the lead actors while also noting its "formulaic elements".

== See also ==
- LGBT rights in the Bahamas
