= Daniel Ribeiro (director) =

Brazilian film director

Daniel Ribeiro (born May 20, 1982) is a Brazilian film director known for his works You, Me and Him (Portuguese: Cafe com Leite, 2007) and I Don't Want To Go Back Alone (Portuguese: Eu Não Quero Voltar Sozinho, 2010), was later made into the full-length feature The Way He Looks (Portuguese: Hoje Eu Quero Voltar Sozinho) in 2014.

In 2007 Ribeiro won an award for You, Me and Him, while the film itself has received many awards including the Crystal Bear for best short film at the 2008 Berlin International Film Festival. The film is about a man named Danilo who is getting ready to move in with his boyfriend Marcos when his parents die unexpectedly and he suddenly gains custody of his 10-year-old brother Lucas.

I Don't Want To Go Back Alone is about a blind boy, Leonardo, and his best friend Giovana who helps guide him home. When a third friend, Gabriel, comes into the picture, Leonardo begins to realize his feelings for him. The full-length version The Way He Looks contains more detail and changes the plot slightly, but features the same concepts as the short. In 2011 I Don't Want To Go Back Alone won the Iris Prize. The Way He Looks won two awards at the 64th Berlin International Film Festival, the FIPRESCI Prize for best feature film in the Panorama section, and the Teddy Award for best LGBT-themed feature.

== Filmography ==
- 2007 – You, Me and Him (Cafe com Leite)
- 2010 – I Don't Want To Go Back Alone (Eu Não Quero Voltar Sozinho)
- 2014 – The Way He Looks (Hoje Eu Quero Voltar Sozinho)
- 2014 – Perfect Endings (13 Sentimentos)
- 2019 – 30/30 Vision: 3 Decades of Strand Releasing (segment "Daniel Ribeiro")

== Awards and nominations ==
(All awards in 2008 for You, Me and Him)

- Winner: 2008 Crystal Bear for Best Short Film at 58th Berlin International Film Festival (Berlinale) – Germany
- Winner of Best Short Film (fiction) at the Grande Prêmio do Cinema Brasileiro
- Winner of "Lente de Cristal" for Best Short Film at the 12th Brazilian Film Festival of Miami – United States
- Winner: "Coxiponé Trophy" for Best Director of Shorts at the 15th Festival de Cinema e Vídeo de Cuiabá – Brazil
- Winner "Menina de Ouro Trophy" for Best Director of Short Films at the First Festival Paulínia de Cinema
- Winner of five awards at the Festival de Cinema de Campina Grande for:
  - Best Short Film
  - Award: Best Short Fiction
  - Award: Best Director
  - Award: Best Screenplay
  - Award: Best Actor (for main lead Daniel Tavares)
- Winner of Best Director – Short Films at the 6th Curta Santos
- Winner of 2011 Iris Prize for Eu Não Quero Voltar Sozinho
- Winner of 2014 Jury's choice at Carrousel international du film de Rimouski for The Way He Looks

Other awards as a screenwriter:

- Winner: Best Script for ENTRE TODOS at the Second Festival of Short Films of Human Rights (2008).
