= Kareem Mortimer =

Bahamian filmmaker (born 1980)

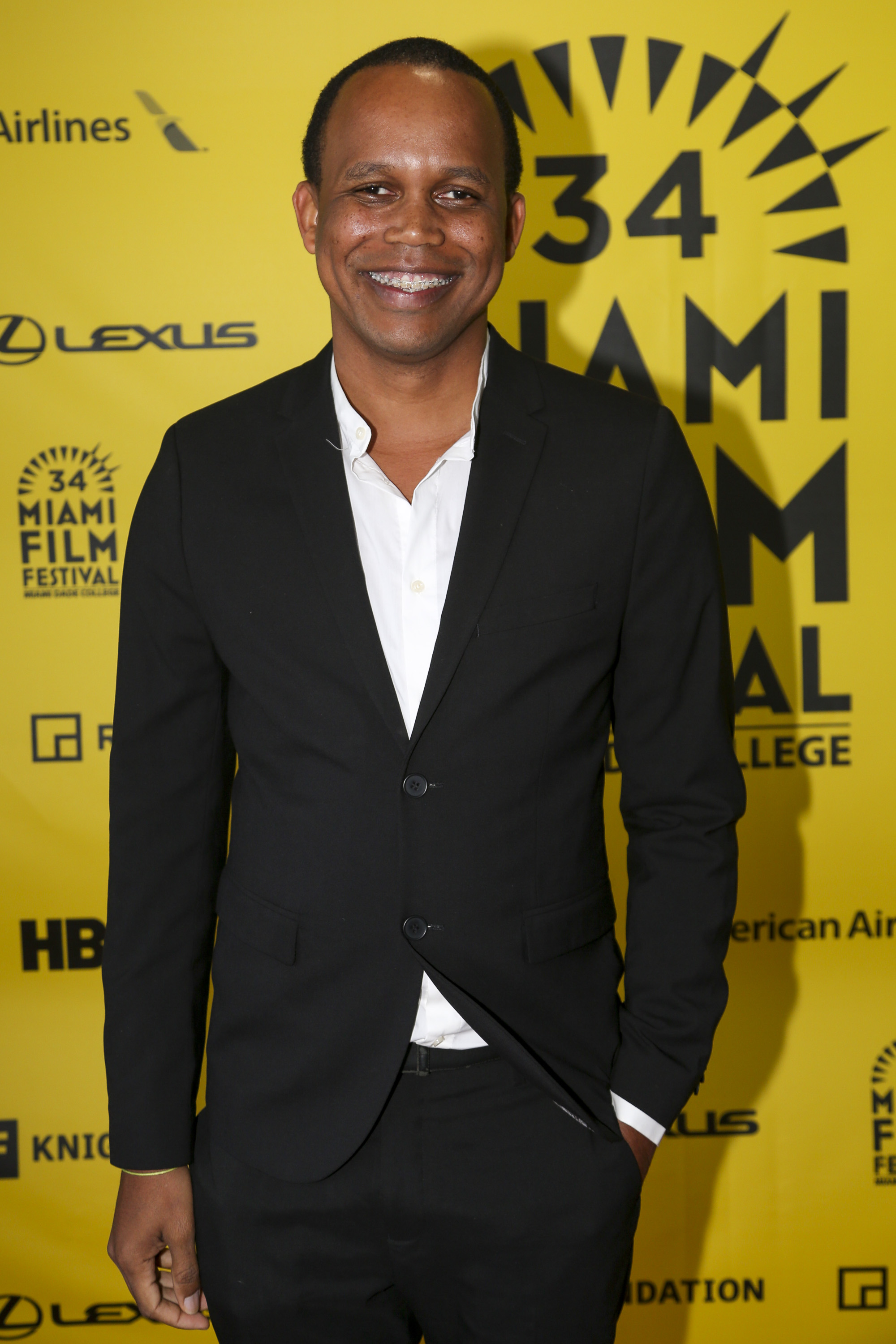
- Mortimer at the 2017 Miami International Film Festival showing of Cargo
- Born: October 17, 1980 (age 45); Nassau, Bahamas
- Occupations: Film director, screenwriter

Kareem Mortimer (born October 17, 1980, in Nassau, Bahamas) is a Bahamian filmmaker who is known for such films as Chance (2005), The Eleutheran Adventure (2006), Float (2007), I Am Not A Dummy (2009), Children of God (2010), Wind Jammers (2010) and Passage (2013).

His debut feature, Children of God (2010), is the first narrative feature from the Caribbean with LGBT themes. Another project, Wind Jammers (2010), which he co-directed with Richard von Maur, is a children's film that deals with racism. Children of God was shown on the television channel Showtime as well as distributed in over twenty-four countries around the world. In 2014, Passage was awarded an African Movie Academy Award for Best Short Film from the Diaspora.
