= Pornographic film =

Films that present sexually explicit subject matter

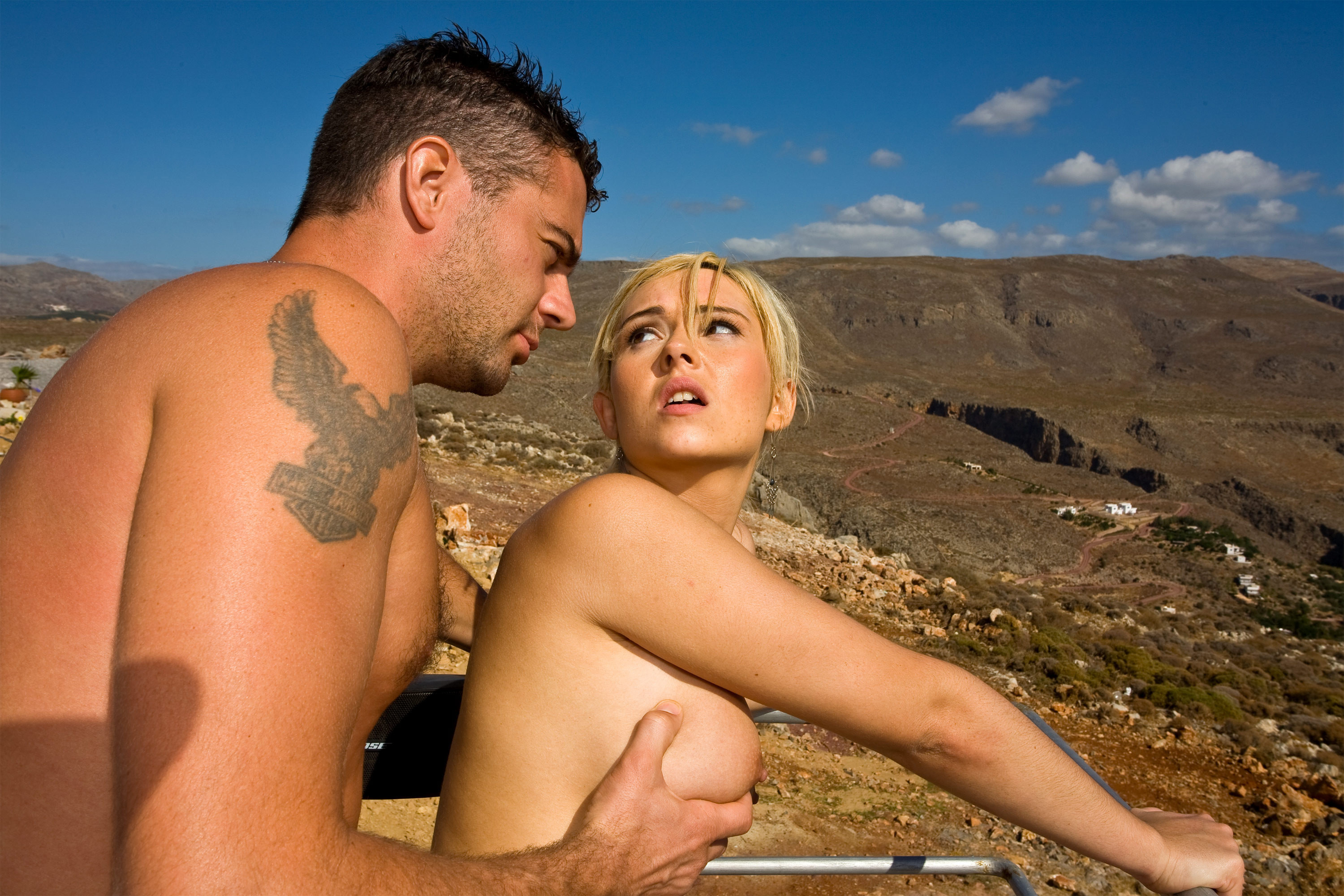
Scene from the pornographic film Montre-moi du rose! (Show Me Some Pink!) (2009)

Pornographic films (colloquially porn films, pornos, porn), sex films, erotic films, adult films, blue films, sexually explicit films, or 18+ films are films that represent sexually explicit subject matter in order to arouse, fascinate, or satisfy the viewer. Pornographic films represent sexual fantasies and usually include erotically stimulating material such as nudity or fetishes (softcore) and sexual intercourse (hardcore). A distinction is sometimes made between "erotic" and "pornographic" films on the basis that the latter category contains more explicit sexuality, and focuses more on arousal than storytelling; the distinction is highly subjective.

Pornographic films are produced and distributed on a variety of media, depending on the demand and technology available, including traditional film stock footage in various formats, home video, DVDs, mobile devices, Internet pornography, Internet download, or cable TV, in addition to other media. Pornography is often sold or rented on DVD; shown through Internet streaming, specialty channels and pay-per-view on cable and satellite; and viewed in rapidly disappearing adult movie theater. Often due to broadcast or print censorship commissions, general public opinion, public decency laws, or religious pressure groups, overly sexualized content is generally not permitted in mainstream media or on free-to-air television.

Films with risqué content have been produced since the invention of motion pictures in the 1880s. Production of such films was profitable, and a number of producers specialized in their production. Various groups within society considered such depictions immoral, labeled them "pornographic", and attempted to have them suppressed under other obscenity laws, with varying degrees of success. Such films continued to be produced, and could initially only be distributed by underground channels. Because the viewing of such films carried a social stigma, they were viewed at brothels, adult movie theaters, bachelor parties, home, private clubs, and night cinemas.

In the 1970s, during the Golden Age of Porn, pornographic films were semi-legitimized, to the point where actors not known for appearances in such productions would be cast members (though rarely participating in the explicit scenes); by the 1980s, pornography on home video achieved wider distribution. The rise of the Internet in the late 1990s and early 2000s changed the way pornographic films were distributed, complicating censorship regimes around the world and legal prosecutions of "obscenity".

== Classification ==
Pornographic films are typically categorized as either softcore or hardcore pornography. In general, softcore pornography is pornography that does not depict explicit sexual activity, sexual penetration or extreme fetishism. It generally contains nudity or partial nudity in sexually suggestive situations. Hardcore pornography is pornography that depicts penetration or extreme fetish acts, or both. It contains graphic sexual activity and visible penetration. A pornographic work is characterized as hardcore if it has any hardcore content.

Pornographic films are generally classified into subgenres which describe the underlying theme or sexual fantasy which the film and actors attempt to create. Subgenres can also be classified into the characteristics of the performers or the type of sexual activity on which it concentrates and not necessarily on the market to which each subgenre appeals. The subgenres usually conform to certain conventions, and each may appeal to a particular audience.

== History ==
=== Early years: before 1920 ===
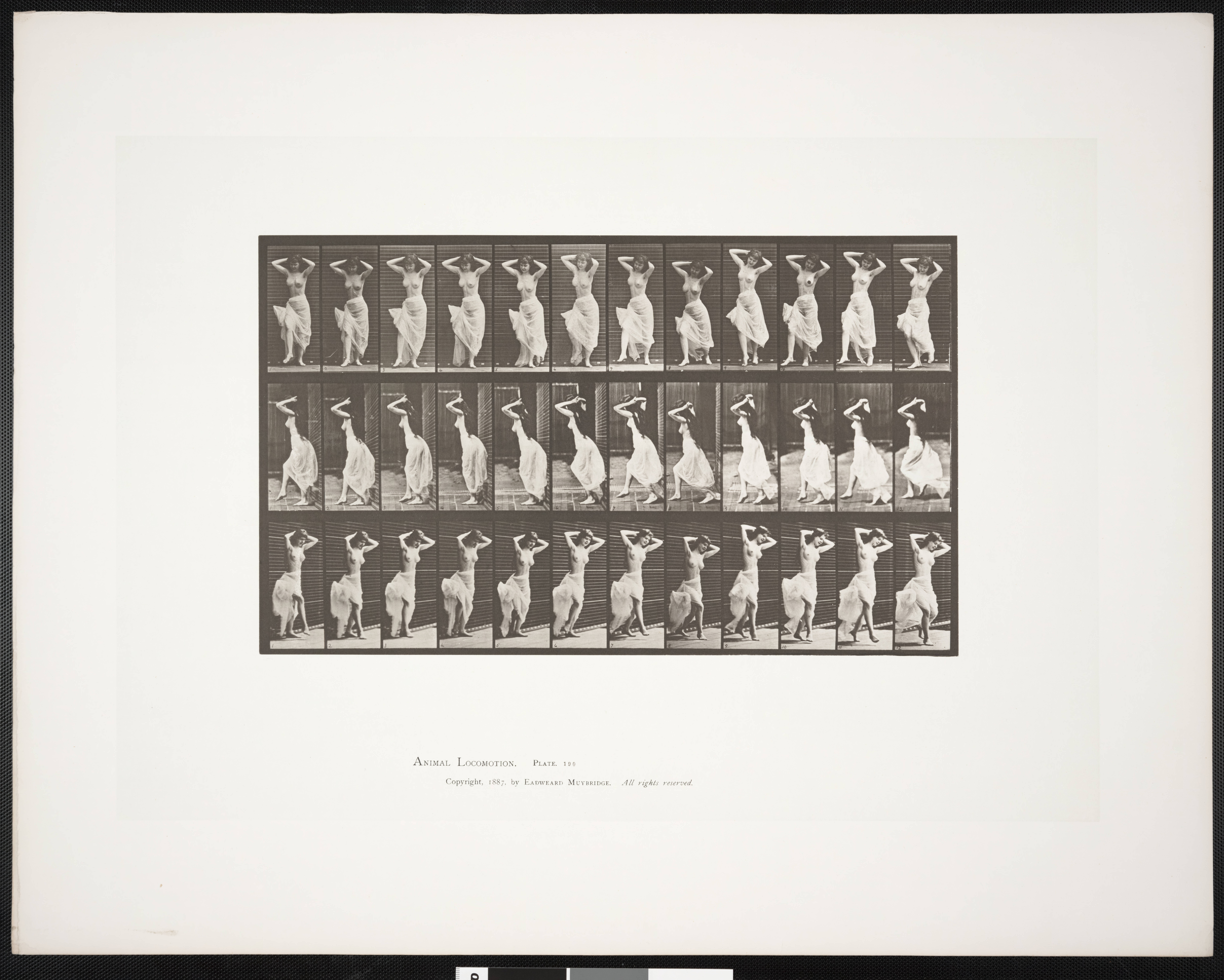
Nude woman with skirt dancing, 1887

Production of erotic films commenced almost immediately after the invention of the motion picture. Two of the earliest pioneers were Frenchmen Eugène Pirou and Albert Kirchner. Kirchner, under the name "Léar", directed the earliest surviving risqué film for Pirou. The 3-minute 1896 film Le Coucher de la Mariée had Louise Willy performing a bedroom striptease. Other French filmmakers also considered that profits could be made from this type of risqué films, showing women disrobing.

In the year 1896, The May Irwin Kiss contained the first kiss on film. It was a 47-second film loop, with a close-up of a nuzzling couple followed by a short peck on the lips ("the mysteries of the kiss revealed"). The kissing scene was denounced as shocking and obscene to early moviegoers and caused the Roman Catholic Church to call for censorship and moral reform, because kissing in public at the time could lead to prosecution. Perhaps in defiance and "to spice up a film", this was followed by many kiss imitators, including The Kiss in the Tunnel (1899) and The Kiss (1900). A tableau vivant style was used in short film Birth of The Pearl (1901) featuring an unnamed long-haired young model wearing a flesh-colored body stocking in a direct frontal pose that provides a provocative view of the female body. The pose is in the style of Botticelli's The Birth of Venus.

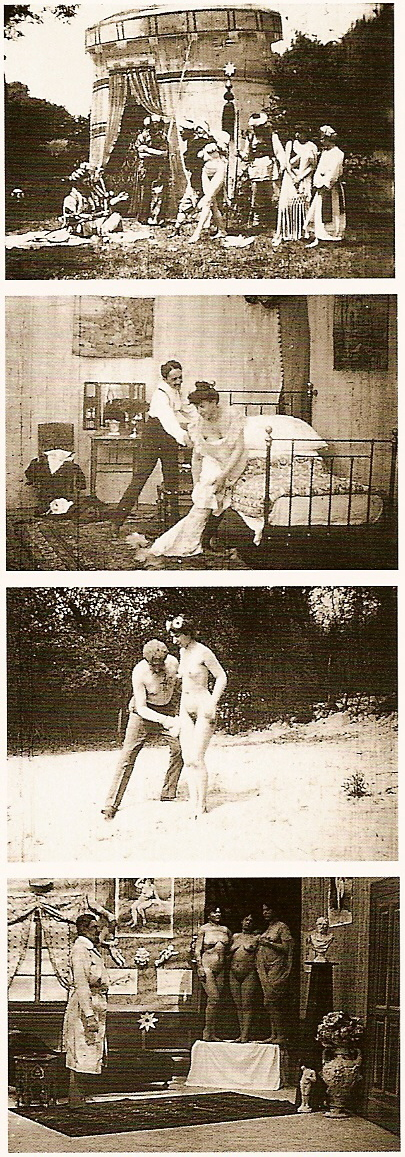
Images from early Austrian erotic movies (about 1906, first image showing Am Sklavenmarkt) by photographer Johann Schwarzer and his Saturn Film company

In Austria, cinemas organised men-only nights (called Herrenabende) at which adult films were shown. Johann Schwarzer formed his Saturn-Film production company which between 1906 and 1911 produced 52 erotic productions, each of which contained young local women fully nude, to be shown at those screenings. Before Schwarzer's productions, erotic films were provided by the Pathé brothers from French produced sources. In 1911, Saturn was dissolved by the censorship authorities, which destroyed all the films they could find, though some have since resurfaced from private collections. There were a number of American films in the 1910s which featured female nudity.

At the beginning of the 20th century, Argentina may have been the first center of pornographic film production in the world. It is considered that the porn film was born in France practically at the same time as the cinematographic medium, but it was in Buenos Aires where the clandestine production of these films, known as stag films or smokers, was capitalized. Around 1905, Pathé and Gaumont moved the production of porn to Argentina to avoid censorship by the French government. These films were not intended for local or popular consumption, but were "sophisticated entertainment for the enjoyment of the well-to-do class of [Europe]." Writing about the origins of underground cinema, Arthur Knight and Hollis Alpert explain that hardcore films were shipped by boat from Argentina to private buyers, mostly in France and England, but also in more distant places such as Russia and the Balkans. In Black and White and Blue (2008), one of the most scholarly attempts to document the origins of the clandestine 'stag film' trade, Dave Thompson recounts ample evidence that such an industry first had sprung up in the brothels of Buenos Aires and other South American cities by the turn of the 20th century, and then quickly spread through Central Europe over the following few years. In his biography of Eugene O'Neill, Louis Sheaffer recounts that the playwright traveled to Buenos Aires in the 1900s and was a frequent visitor to the pornographic cinemas in the Barracas neighborhood. The Argentine film El Sartorio (also known as El Satario) is perhaps the oldest known pornographic film, a theory held by several authors. Filmed between 1907 and 1912 on the riverside of Quilmes or Rosario, the film depicts six nude nymphs who are surprised by a satyr or faun, who captures one of them and then has sex in a variety of positions, including the 69. El Sartorio is held currently in the Kinsey Institute's film archive, the largest collection of stag films in the world.

Because Pirou is nearly unknown as a pornographic filmmaker, credit is often given to other films for being the first. According to Patrick Robertson's Film Facts, "the earliest pornographic motion picture which can definitely be dated is A L'Ecu d'Or ou la bonne auberge" made in France in 1908. The plot depicts a weary soldier who has a tryst with a servant girl at an inn. He also notes that "the oldest surviving pornographic films are contained in America's Kinsey Collection. One film demonstrates how early pornographic conventions were established. The German film Am Abend (1910) is a ten-minute film which begins with a woman masturbating alone in her bedroom, and progresses to scenes of her with a man in the missionary position, fellatio, and penile anal penetration."

=== 1920s–1940s suppression ===
Two stag films depicting women performing striptease

Pornographic movies were widespread in the silent movie era of the 1920s, and were often shown in brothels. Soon illegal, stag films, or blue films, as they were called, were produced underground by amateurs for many years starting in the 1940s. Processing the film took considerable time and resources, with people using their bathtubs to wash the film when processing facilities (often tied to organized crime) were unavailable. The films were then circulated privately or by traveling salesmen, but anyone caught viewing or possessing them risked a prison sentence.

=== 1950s: home movies ===
The post-war era saw technological developments that further stimulated the growth of a mass market and amateur film-making, particularly the introduction of the 8 mm and super-8 film gauges, popular for the home movie market.

Entrepreneurs emerged to meet the demand. In Britain, in the 1950s, Harrison Marks produced films which were considered risqué, and which today would be described as "soft core". In 1958, as an offshoot of his magazines, Marks began making short films for the 8mm market of his models undressing and posing topless, popularly known as "glamour home movies". To Marks, the term "glamour" was a euphemism for nude modeling/photography.

=== 1960s: Europe and United States ===
Starting in 1961, Lasse Braun was a pioneer in quality colour productions that were, in the early days, distributed by making use of his father's diplomatic privileges. Braun was able to accumulate funds for his lavish productions from the profit gained with so-called loops, ten-minute hardcore movies which he sold to Reuben Sturman, who distributed them to 60,000 American peep show booths. Braun was always on the move, and made his hardcore movies in a number of countries, including Spain, France, Sweden, Denmark and the Netherlands.

In December 1960, American female director Doris Wishman began producing a series of eight pornographic films, or nudist films without sex scenes, including Hideout in the Sun (1960), Nude on the Moon (1961) and Diary of a Nudist (1961). She also produced a series of sexploitation films.

In the 1960s, social and judicial attitudes towards the explicit depiction of sexuality began to change. For example, Swedish film I Am Curious (Yellow) (1967) included numerous frank nude scenes and simulated sexual intercourse. In one particularly controversial scene, Lena kisses her lover's flaccid penis. The film was exhibited in mainstream cinemas, but in 1969 it was banned in Massachusetts allegedly for being pornographic. The ban was challenged in the courts, with the Supreme Court of the United States ultimately declaring that the film was not obscene, paving the way for other sexually explicit films. Another Swedish film Language of Love (1969) was also sexually explicit, but was framed as a quasi-documentary sex educational film, which made its legal status uncertain though controversial.

In 1969, Denmark became the first country to abolish all censorship laws, enabling pornography, including hardcore pornography. The example was followed by toleration in the Netherlands, also in 1969. There was an explosion of pornography commercially produced in those countries, including, at the very beginning, child pornography and bestiality porn. Now that being a pornographer was legal, there was no shortage of businessmen who invested in plant and equipment capable of turning out a mass-produced, cheap, but quality product. Vast amounts of this new pornography, both magazines and films, needed to be smuggled into other parts of Europe, where it was sold "under the counter" or (sometimes) shown in "members only" cinema clubs.

In the United States, producers of pornographic films formed the Adult Film Association of America in 1969, following the release of Blue Movie by Andy Warhol, to fight against censorship and to defend the industry against obscenity charges. Shortly after the release of Blue Movie, Warhol rented the Fortune Theater in Manhattan's East Village and screened gay pornography films from June 25 to August 5, 1969. The theater was called "Andy Warhol's Theater: Boys to Adore Galore" and run by Warhol's associate, Gerard Malanga. When the police shut down another similar theater nearby, they decided to close theirs to avoid getting busted.

=== 1970s: adult theaters and movie booths in the United States ===
In the 1970s, there was a more tolerant judicial attitude to non-mainstream films. Mainstream theatres did not usually screen even softcore films, leading to a rise of adult theaters in the United States and many other countries. There was also a proliferation of coin-operated "movie booths" in sex shops that displayed pornographic 8 mm film "loops" (a continuous loop like an endless tape cartridge for audio).

Denmark started producing comparatively big-budget theatrical feature film sex comedies such as Bordellet (1972), the Bedside-films (1970–1976) and the Zodiac-films (1973–1978), starring mainstream actors (a few of whom even performed their own sex scenes) and usually not thought of as "porno films" though all except the early Bedside-films included hardcore pornographic scenes. Several of these films still rank among the most seen films in Danish film history and all remain favourites on home video.

In 1969, Blue Movie by Andy Warhol was the first adult erotic film depicting explicit sex to receive wide theatrical release in the United States. The film was a seminal film in the Golden Age of Porn and, according to Warhol, a major influence in the making of Last Tango in Paris, an internationally controversial erotic drama film, starring Marlon Brando, and released a few years after Blue Movie was made.

The first explicitly pornographic film with a plot that received a general theatrical release in the U.S. is generally considered to be Mona the Virgin Nymph (also known as Mona), a 59-minute 1970 feature by Bill Osco, who created the relatively high-budget hardcore/softcore (depending on the release) 1974 cult film Flesh Gordon and later, in 1976, the X-rated musical-comedy film Alice in Wonderland.

The 1971 film Boys in the Sand represented a number of pornographic firsts. As the first generally available gay pornographic film, the film was the first to include on-screen credits for its cast and crew (albeit largely under pseudonyms), to parody the title of a mainstream film (in this case, The Boys in the Band), and, after the 1969 film Blue Movie, one of the first to be reviewed by The New York Times. Other notable American hardcore feature films of the 1970s include Deep Throat (1972), Behind the Green Door (1972), The Devil in Miss Jones (1973), Radley Metzger's The Opening of Misty Beethoven (1976) and Debbie Does Dallas (1978). These were shot on film and screened in mainstream movie theaters. In Britain, Deep Throat was not approved in its uncut form until 2000 and not shown publicly until June 2005.

In the U.S. Miller v. California was an important court case in 1973. The case established that obscenity was not legally protected, but the case also established the Miller test, a three-pronged test to determine obscenity (which is not legal) as opposed to indecency (which may or may not be legal).

=== 1980s: new technology and new legal cases ===
With the arrival of the home video cassette recorder in the late 1970s and early 1980s, the pornographic movie industry experienced massive growth and spawned adult stars like Traci Lords, Seka, Christy Canyon, Ginger Lynn, Nina Hartley, and directors such as Gregory Dark. By 1982, most pornographic films were being shot on the cheaper and more convenient medium of videotape. Many film directors resisted this shift at first because videotape produced a different image quality. Those who did change soon were collecting most of the industry's profits, since consumers overwhelmingly preferred the new format. The technology change happened quickly and completely when directors realized that continuing to shoot on film was no longer a profitable option. This change moved the films out of the theaters and into people's homes. This marked the end of the age of big-budget productions, and the beginning of the mainstreaming of pornography. It soon went back to its earthy roots and expanded to cover nearly every fetish possible, since the production of pornography was now inexpensive. Instead of hundreds of pornographic films being made each year, thousands were being made, including compilations of just the sex scenes from various videos. One could now not only watch pornography in the comfort and privacy of one's own home, but also find more choices available to satisfy specific fantasies and fetishes.

Similarly, the camcorder spurred changes in pornography in the 1980s, when people could make their own amateur sex movies, whether for private use, or for wider distribution.

The de facto result of the 1987 legal case People v. Freeman effectively legalized hardcore pornography in the U.S. The prosecution of Harold Freeman was initially planned as the first in a series of legal cases to effectively outlaw the production of such movies.

=== 1990s: DVD and the Internet age ===
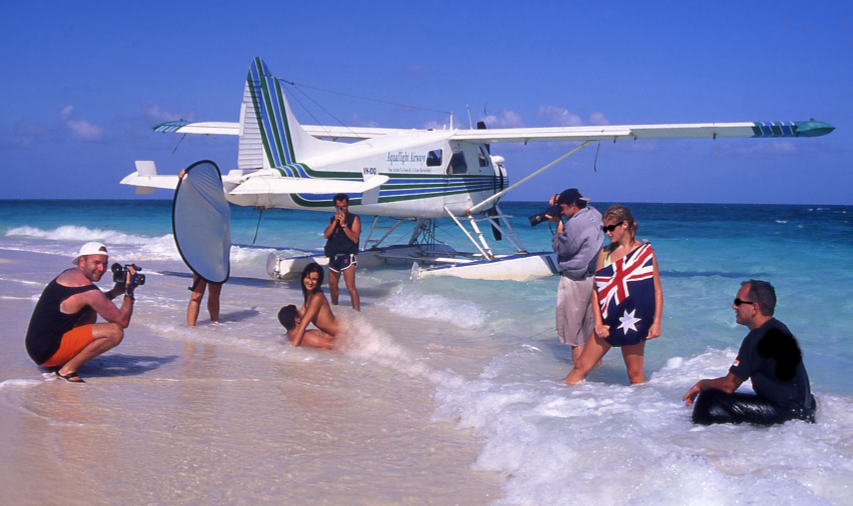
Production crew of Pierre Woodman shooting pornographic film "The Fugitive", with actors Jeanette Marton and Philippe Soine performing on a location in Australia in 1997

In the late 1990s, pornographic films were distributed on DVD. These offered better quality picture and sound than the previous video format (videotape) and allowed innovations such as "interactive" videos that let users choose such variables as multiple camera angles, multiple endings and computer-only DVD content.

The introduction and widespread availability of the Internet further changed the way pornography was distributed. Previously, videos were ordered from an adult bookstore or through mail-order; with the Internet, people could watch pornographic movies on their computers, and instead of waiting weeks for an order to arrive, a movie could be downloaded within minutes (or, later, within a few seconds).

Pornography can be distributed over the Internet in a number of ways, including paysites, video hosting services and peer-to-peer file sharing. While pornography had been traded electronically since the 1980s, the invention of the World Wide Web in 1991, as well as the opening of the Internet to the general public around the same time, led to an explosion in online pornography.

Viv Thomas, Paul Thomas, Andrew Blake, Antonio Adamo, and Rocco Siffredi were prominent directors of pornographic films in the 1990s. In 1998, the Danish, Oscar-nominated film production company Zentropa became the world's first mainstream film company to openly produce hardcore pornographic films, starting with Constance (1998). That same year, Zentropa also produced Idioterne (1998), directed by Lars von Trier, which won many international awards and was nominated for a Golden Palm in Cannes. The film includes a shower sequence with a male erection and an orgy scene with close-up penetration footage (the camera viewpoint is from the ankles of the participants, and the close-ups leave no doubt as to what is taking place). Idioterne started a wave of international mainstream arthouse films featuring explicit sexual images, such as Catherine Breillat's Romance, which starred porn star Rocco Siffredi.

In 1999, the Danish TV channel Kanal København started broadcasting hardcore films at night, uncoded and freely available to any viewer in the Copenhagen area (as of 2009, this is still the case, courtesy of Innocent Pictures, a company started by Zentropa).

Once people could watch adult movies in the privacy of their own homes, a new adult market developed that far exceeded the scope of its theater-centric predecessor. The Internet served as catalyst for creating a still-larger market for porn, a market that is even less traditionally theatrical.

By the 2000s, there were hundreds of adult film companies, releasing tens of thousands of productions, recorded directly on video, with minimal sets. The market was further expanded by webcams and webcam recordings, in which thousands of pornographic actors work in front of the camera to satisfy pornography consumers' demand.

=== 2000s to present: competition and contraction ===
By the 2000s, the fortunes of the pornography industry had changed. With reliably profitable DVD sales being largely supplanted by streaming media delivery over the Internet, competition from bootleg, amateur and low-cost professional content on the Internet had made the industry substantially less profitable, leading to it shrinking in size. At the same time this gave rise to video sharing platforms such as Pornhub, XVideos and xHamster.

As of 2001 the earnings of the pornographic industry were estimated at 520 million dollars. As of 1999, pornographic websites had about 30% to 40% profit magin. Pay-per-view porn used to be very profitable for TV cable companies, but that changed in the 2010s.

"Free porn" websites have shrunk profit margins; as of 2020 Aylo (MindGeek) has about 25% profit margin. As of 2026 OnlyFans has 37% net margin; in earnings per employee, it surpasses nVidia and Apple.

== Pornographic film industry ==
=== Economics ===
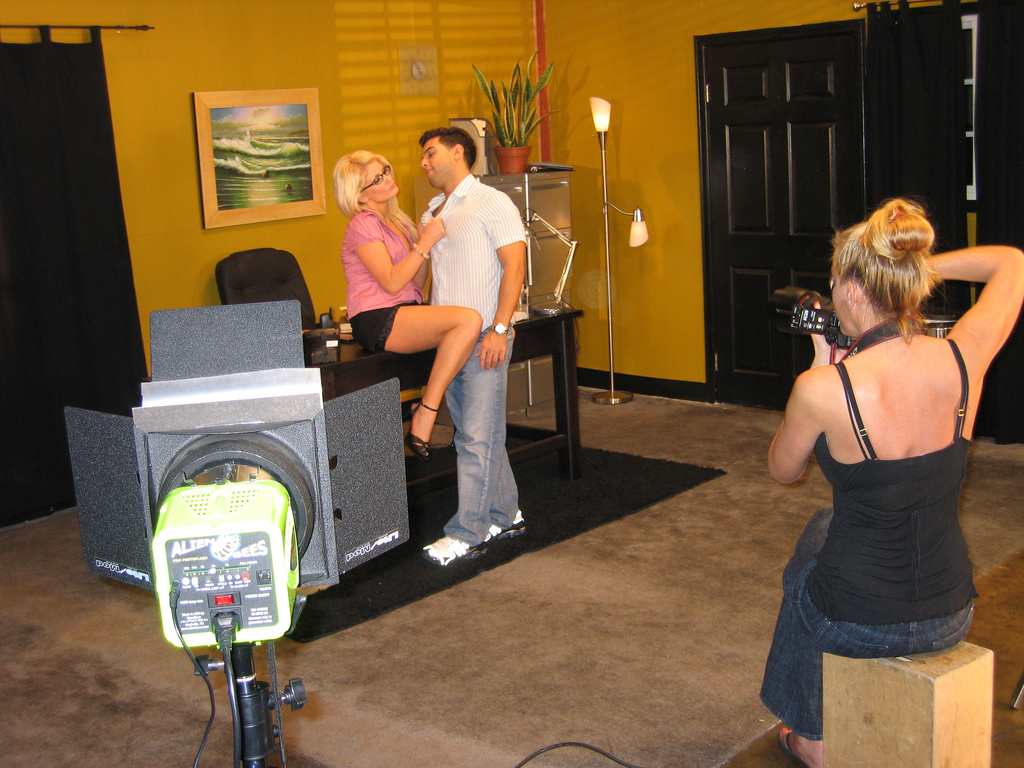
Actress Cali Chase seducing actor Mikey Butders on a Naughty America film set before performing sexual intercourse in December 2007

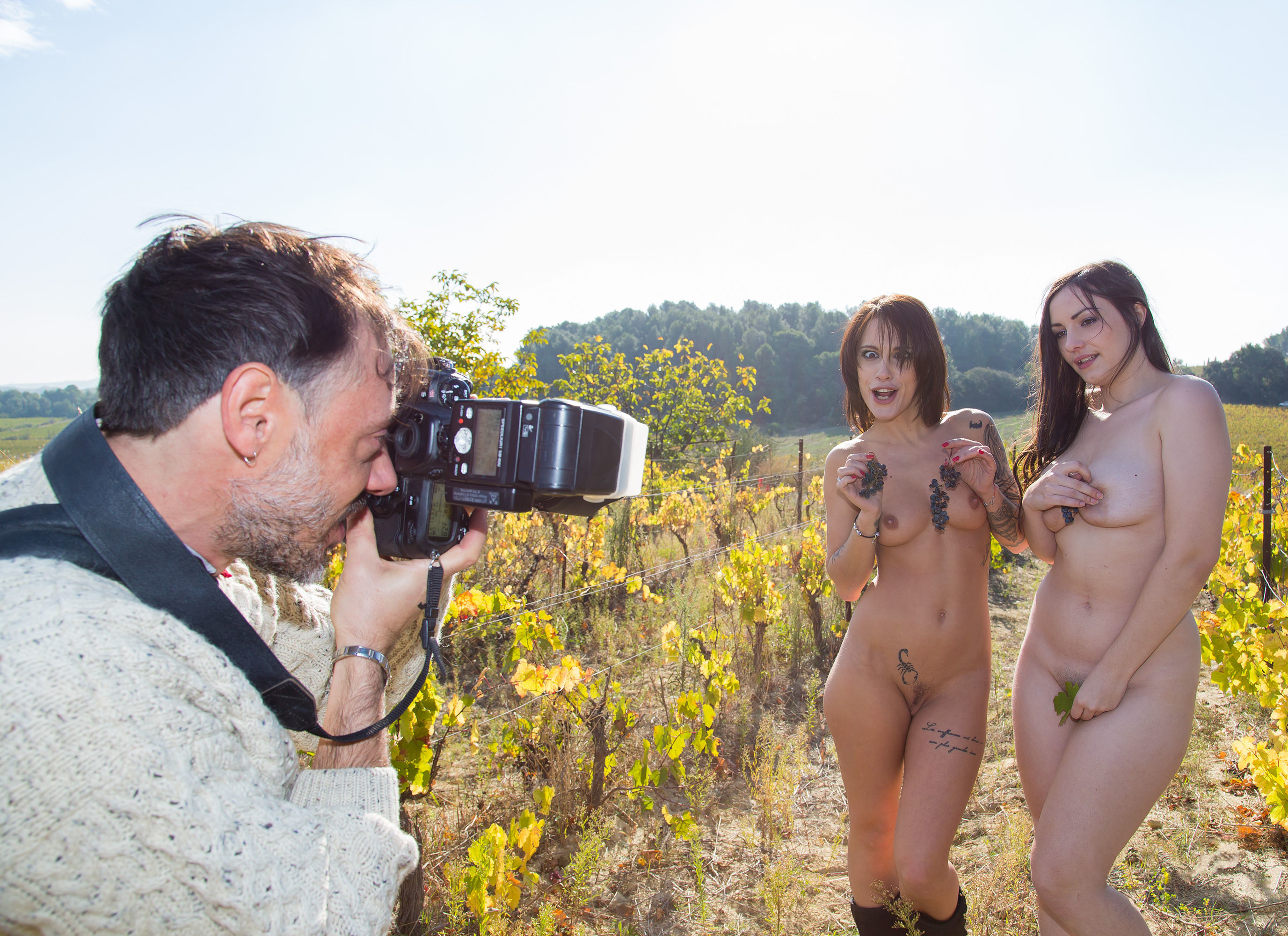
Porn actresses Nikita Bellucci and Alice Leroy being photographed by porn actor Francesco Malcom on the set of the film "EquinoXe" in 2015

Globally, pornography is a large-scale business with revenues of nearly $100 billion, which includes the production of various media and associated products and services. The industry employs thousands of performers along with support and production staff. It is also followed by dedicated industry publications and trade groups as well as the mainstream press, private organizations (watchdog groups), government agencies, and political organizations. According to a 2005 Reuters article, "The multi-billion-dollar industry releases about 11,000 titles on DVD each year." Pornographic films can be sold or rented out on DVD, shown through the Internet and special channels and pay-per-view on cable and satellite, and screened in adult theaters. However, by 2012, widespread availability of illegally copied content and other low-cost competition on the Internet had shrunk the pornographic film industry and reduced profitability.

The global pornographic film industry is dominated by the United States, with the San Fernando Valley area of Los Angeles being the heart of the industry.

In 1975, the total retail value of all the hardcore pornography in the United States was estimated at $5–$10 million. The 1979 Revision of the Federal Criminal Code stated that "in Los Angeles alone, the porno business does $100 million a year in gross retain volume." According to the 1986 Attorney General's Commission on Pornography, American adult entertainment industry has grown considerably over the past thirty years by continually changing and expanding to appeal to new markets, though the production is considered to be low-profile and clandestine.

As of 2013 the total current income of the country's adult entertainment is often estimated at $10–$13 billion, of which $4–$6 billion are legal. The figure is often credited to a study by Forrester Research and was lowered in 1998. In 2007 The Observer newspaper also gave a figure of $13 billion. Other sources, quoted by Forbes (Adams Media Research, Veronis Suhler Communications Industry Report, and IVD), even taking into consideration all possible means (video networks and pay-per-view movies on cable and satellite, websites, in-room hotel movies, phone sex, sex toys, and magazines) mention the $2.6–$3.9 billion figure (without the cellphone component). USA Today claimed in 2003 that websites such as Danni's Hard Drive and Cybererotica.com generated $2 billion in revenue in that year, which was allegedly about 10% of the overall domestic porn market at the time. The adult movies income (from sale and rent) was once estimated by AVN Publications at $4.3 billion but the figure obtaining is unclear. According to the 2001 Forbes data, the annual income distribution is the following:

| Adult video | $500 million to $1.8 billion |
| Internet | $1 billion |
| Magazines | $1 billion |
| Pay-per-view | $128 million |
| Mobile | $30 million |

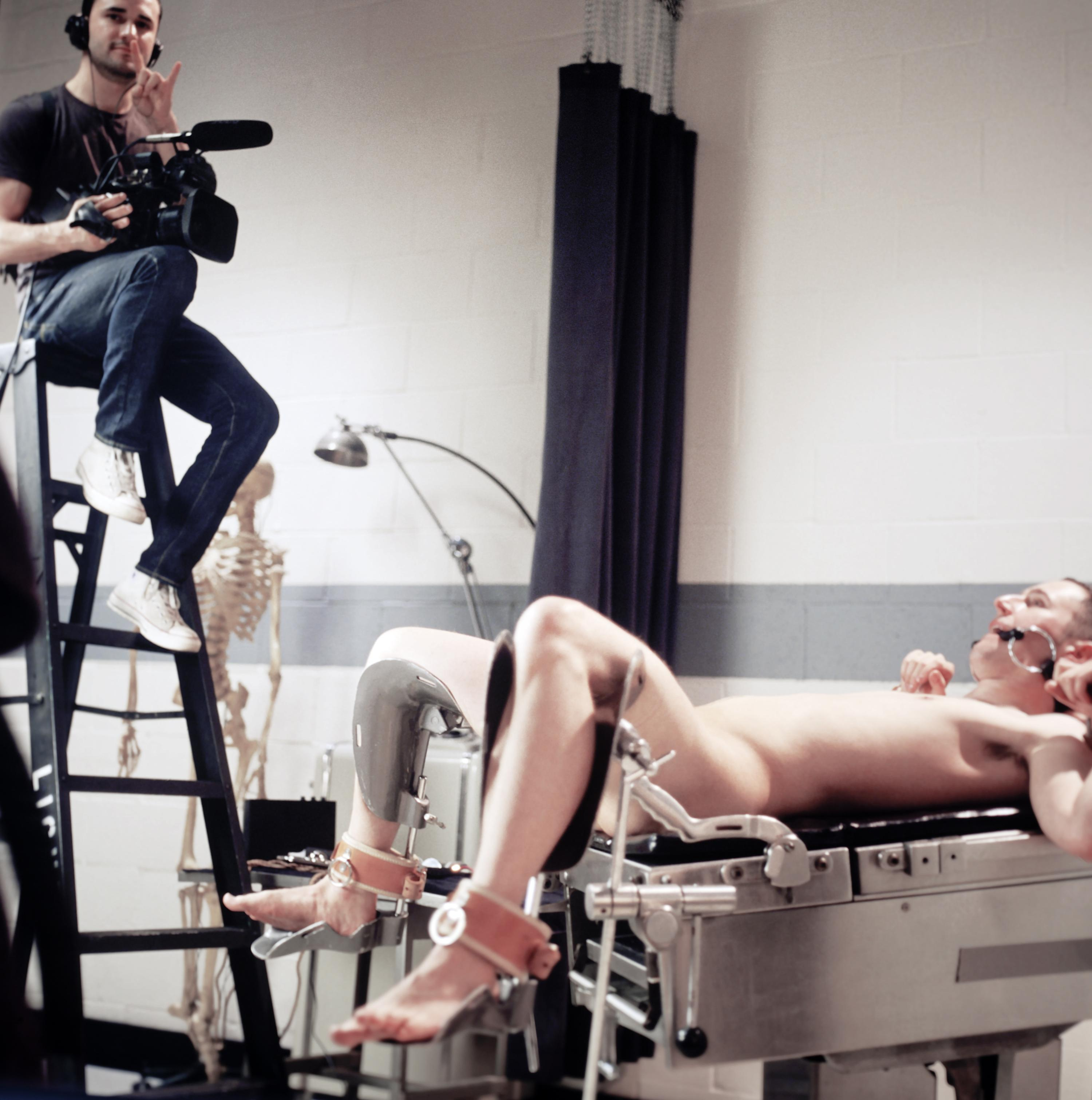
The film set for a medical fetishism scene

The Online Journalism Review, published by the Annenberg School of Communication at the University of Southern California, weighed in with an analysis that favored Forbes' number. The financial extent of adult films, distributed in hotels, is hard to estimate—hotels keep statistics to themselves or do not keep them at all.

The world's largest adult movie studio Vivid Entertainment generates an estimated $100 million a year in revenue, distributing 60 films annually, and selling them in video stores, hotel rooms, on cable systems, and on the Internet. The Spanish-based studio Private Media Group was listed on the NASDAQ until November 2011. Video rentals soared from just under 80 million in 1985 to a half-billion by 1993. Some subsidiaries of major corporations are the largest pornography sellers, like News Corporation's DirecTV. Comcast, the nation's largest cable company, once pulled in $50 million from adult programming. Revenues of companies such as Playboy and Hustler were small by comparison.

=== Sexual Behaviours and Violence in Pornographic films ===
Video-based pornography depicts a wide range of sexual behaviors, themes, and relationships. The most common practices are those considered normative in Western culture: fellatio and vaginal intercourse in heterosexual pornography, and fellatio, kissing, cunnilingus, and anal sex in gay pornography, although not consistently in heterosexual depictions. Heterosexual anal intercourse is relatively common, appearing in 15–32% of web videos and up to half of DVD scenes. It has increased since the 1980s/90s, but not necessarily since the 2000s or in the internet age. Paraphilias are very rare, but incest is more common than others, appearing in three-quarters of the studies which examined it. Bestiality and depictions involving children were not observed, indicating that they are very rare. Condoms are almost completely absent in heterosexual pornography, but appear more frequently in gay pornography. Aggression and violence are more common in older formats than on the internet, although the understanding of “consent” is unclear. Explicit violence such as rape is rare in mainstream internet pornography; punching, kicking, torture, or murder have only been observed a handful of times. Other forms of aggression are reasonably common but vary greatly. Spanking is found in most DVDs and in up to a third of internet content, suggesting normalization. Violence is predominantly directed by men against women. In heterosexual pornography, male ejaculation is regularly shown, while female orgasms are rare even if they appear to be faked. Cunnilingus is less common than fellatio. Men usually appear dominant, women submissive. Practices considered degrading or demeaning, such as facial or oral ejaculation, are regularly seen. “Ass to mouth” appears in about one-third of the DVDs examined. It is unclear whether content has changed significantly over time due to few and methodologically inconsistent studies. Heterosexual anal intercourse is more common in DVD and internet pornography than in VHS. Aggressive behavior (verbal abuse, spanking, hair pulling, choking, slapping) occurs more frequently in DVDs than in internet or VHS material, while rape was more prevalent in VHS pornography than in newer media.

Distribution of sexual behaviours and violence in Pornographic films.

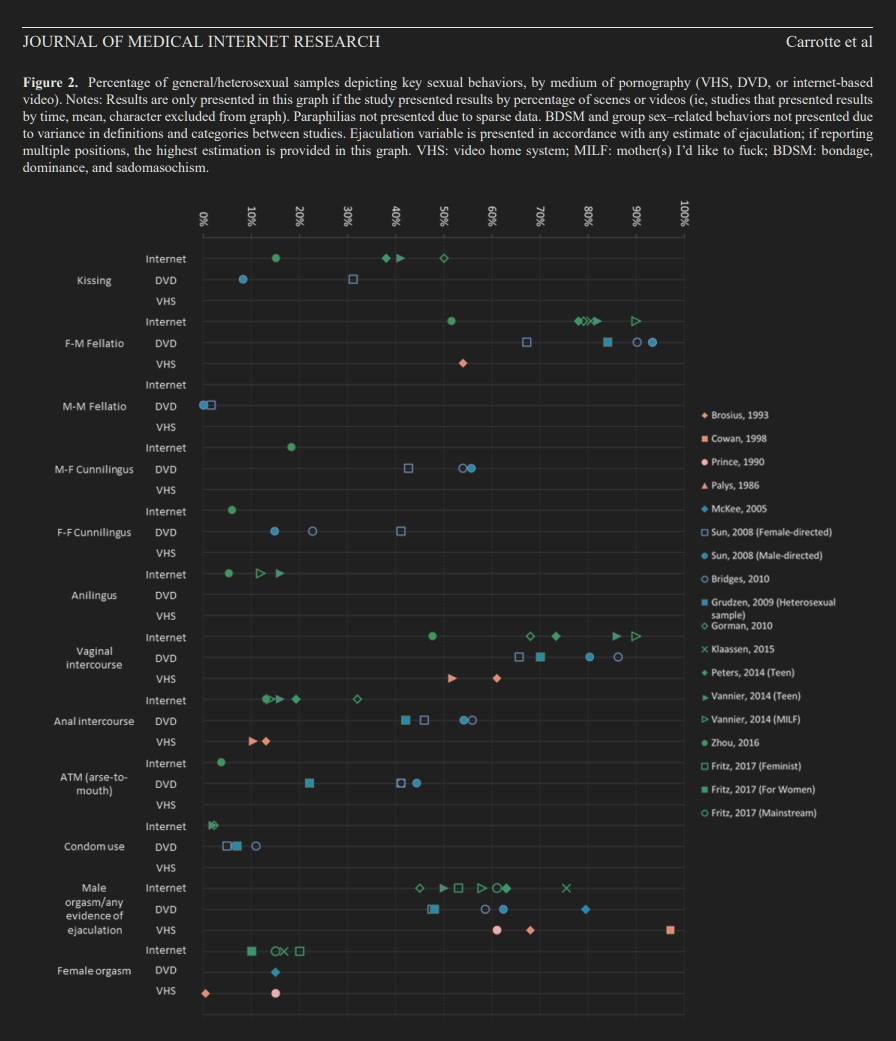

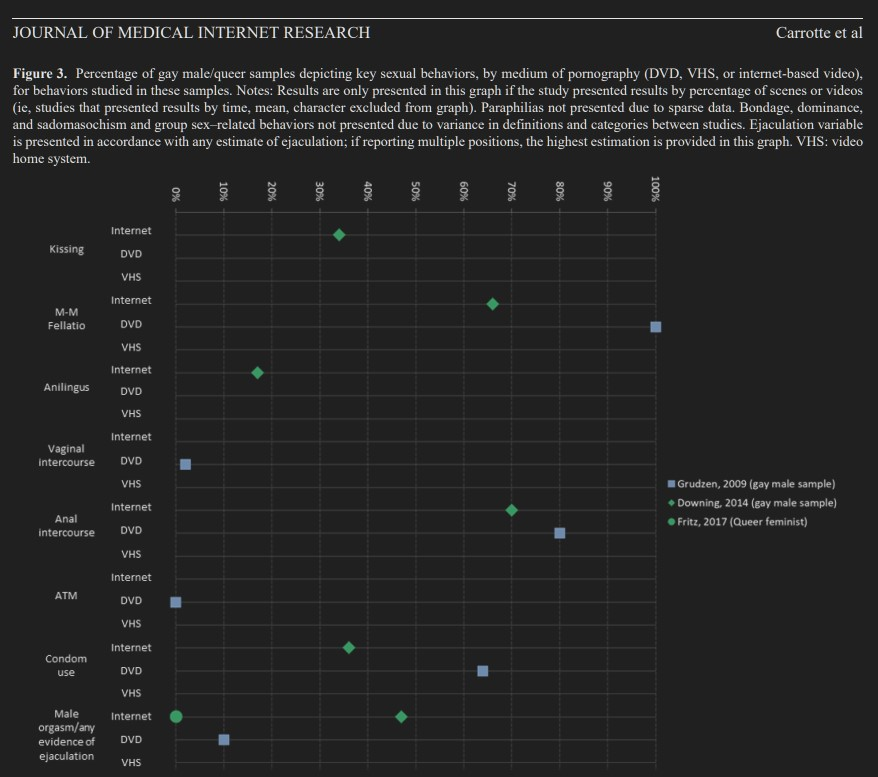

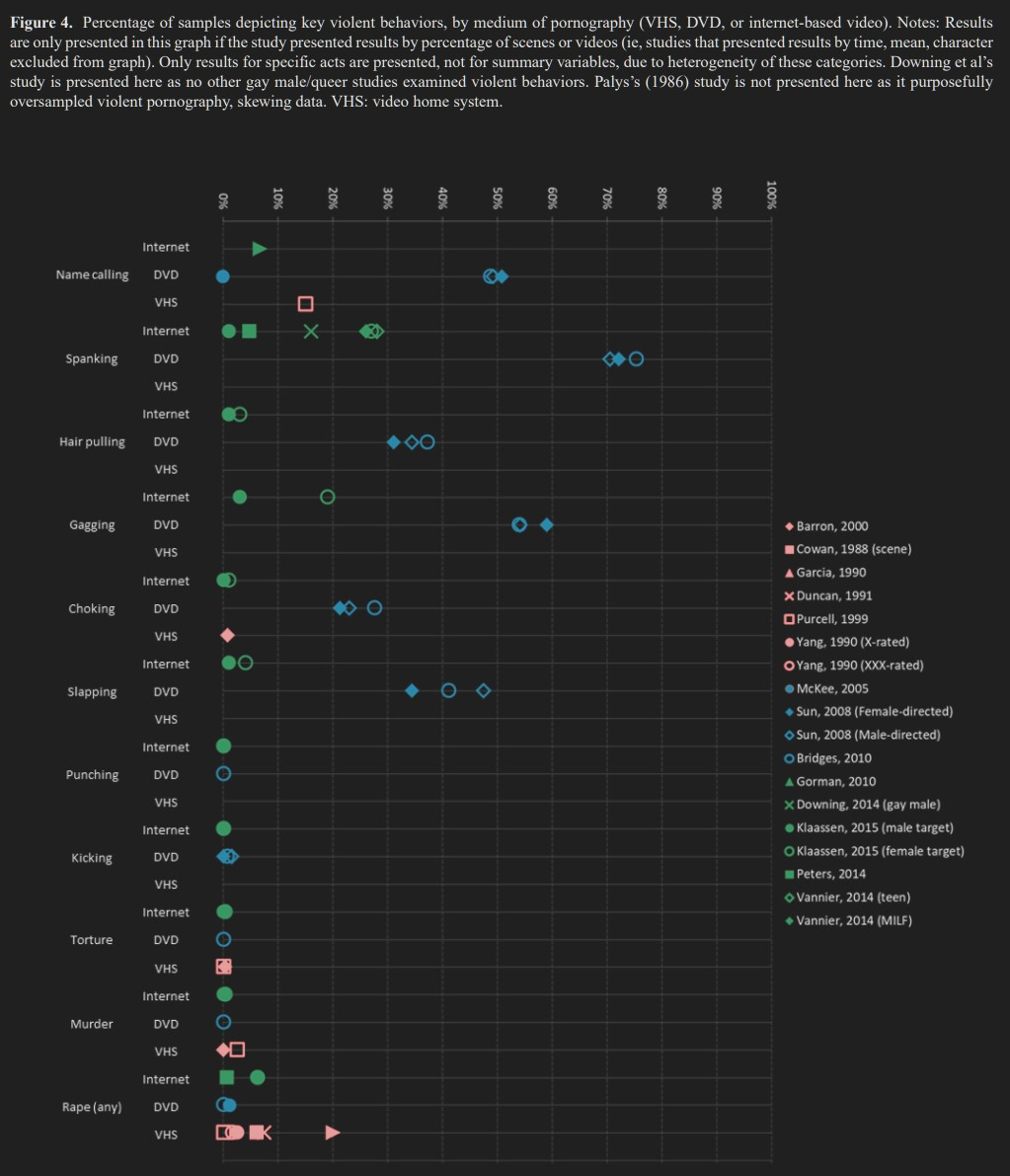

=== Legal status ===
In the United States, the Supreme Court held in 1969 that state laws making mere private possession of obscene material a crime are invalid. Further attempts were made in the 1970s in the United States to close down the pornography industry, this time by prosecuting those in the industry on prostitution charges. The prosecution started in the courts in California in the case of People v. Freeman. The California Supreme Court acquitted Freeman and distinguished between someone who takes part in a sexual relationship for money (prostitution) versus someone whose role is merely portraying a sexual relationship on-screen as part of their acting performance. The State did not appeal to the United States Supreme Court making the decision binding in California, where most pornographic films are made today.

At present, no other state in the United States has either implemented or accepted this legal distinction between commercial pornography performers versus prostitutes as shown in the Florida case where sex film maker Clinton Raymond McCowen, a.k.a. "Ray Guhn", was indicted on charges of "soliciting and engaging in prostitution" for his creation of pornography films which included "McCowen and his associates recruited up to 100 local men and women to participate in group sex scenes, the affidavit says." The distinction that California has in its legal determination in the Freeman decision is usually denied in most states' local prostitution laws, which do not specifically exclude performers from such inclusion.

In some cases, some states have ratified their local state laws for inclusion to prevent California's Freeman decision to be applied to actors who are paid a fee for sexual actions within their state borders. One example is the state of Texas whose prostitution law specifically states:

An offense is established under Subsection (a)(1) whether the actor is to receive or pay a fee. An offense is established under Subsection (a)(2) whether the actor solicits a person to hire him or offers to hire the person solicited.

In the United States, federal law prohibits the sale, distribution or dissemination of obscene materials through the mail, over the broadcast airwaves, on cable or satellite TV, on the Internet, over the telephone or by any other means that cross state lines. Most states also have specific laws banning the sale or distribution of obscene pornography within state borders. The only protection for obscene material recognized by the Supreme Court of the United States is personal possession in the home (Stanley v. Georgia).

The Supreme Court of the United States affirmed in Miller v. California that obscenity was not protected speech. Further, the court ruled that each community is responsible for setting its own standards about what is considered to be obscene material. If pornographic material is prosecuted and brought to trial, a jury can deem it obscene based on:

1. whether "the average person, applying contemporary community standards" would find that the work, taken as a whole, appeals to the prurient interest
2. whether the work depicts or describes, in a patently offensive way, sexual conduct specifically defined by applicable state law and
3. whether the work, taken as a whole, lacks serious literary, artistic, political or scientific value.

In many countries pornography is legal to distribute and to produce, but there are some restrictions. Pornography is also banned in some countries, in particular in the Muslim world and China, but can be accessed through the Internet in some of these nations.

=== Health issues ===
Sex acts in pornographic films have traditionally been performed without the use of condoms, with an accompanying risk of sexually transmitted disease among performers. In 1986, there was an outbreak of HIV infection which led to the deaths through AIDS of several actors and actresses. This led to the creation in 1998 of the Adult Industry Medical Health Care Foundation (AIM), which helped set up a monitoring system in the U.S. pornographic film industry, which required pornographic film actors to be tested for HIV every 30 days. As of 2013, HIV infection of performers in the U.S. pornography industry has been rare, with only a few outbreaks being recorded over the subsequent three decades. The AIM closed its doors in May 2011 and filed for bankruptcy as a result of a court case arising from an inadvertent leak by it of confidential information on clients, including names and STD results.

== See also ==
- List of pornographic film awards
- Cartoon pornography
- Cum shot
- Hentai
- List of pornographic film studios
- Pornography addiction
- Porn groove
- Porn parody
- Pornography by region
- Sex industry
- STDs in the porn industry
- Unsimulated sex
