= The Surprise of a Knight =

1929 film

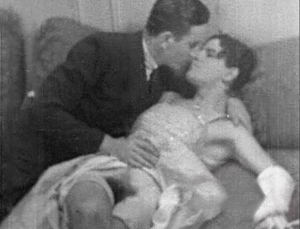
- Still from the film
- Written by: "Oscar Wild" (pseudonym; the writer's real name is unknown)
- Starring: Two uncredited male sexual performers, and one female non-sexual performer
- Release date: 1929
- Running time: 10 minutes
- Country: United States
- Language: Silent (English intertitles)

The Surprise of a Knight is a gay pornographic hardcore film from the United States. Most likely released in 1929, it is notable for being the earliest known American pornographic film to depict exclusively homosexual intercourse.

== Background ==
The first known motion pictures depicting nude men were made by Eadweard Muybridge in the 1880s and 1890s as part of his studies of human locomotion.

Hardcore pornographic films (later called "stag films") first appeared in Europe in 1908. Most historians consider the first genuine American stag film to be A Free Ride, produced and released in 1915. By 1920, the first hardcore homosexual sex acts were depicted in the film Le ménage moderne du Madame Butterfly. However, like most of the films which came after it, Le ménage moderne du Madame Butterfly only shows male-male sex acts as deviant, firmly establishes the heterosexuality of the characters, and usually depicts gay sex acts as essentially bisexual (e.g., male-male sexual contact occurs while the men are also having heterosexual intercourse).

The illegality of hardcore pornographic films in the United States in the 1920s and 1930s means that no producer, performer or other credits for The Surprise of a Knight are identifiable. However, researchers have dated the film to at least 1929 (although earlier estimates placed its production in 1930). This makes The Surprise of a Knight the first known hardcore gay pornographic film in American cinematic history.

== Plot ==
The film opens with an elegantly attired "woman" with short hair as she finishes dressing for a visitor. As the "lady" completes her boudoir, she lifts her skirts to reveal a thick patch of pubic hair. At this point, an intertitle reveals that the screenwriter is "Oscar Wild" (clearly a pseudonym).

The "lady" goes into the drawing room and offers her well-attired gentleman caller (her "knight") a drink. He refuses it, and she drinks the cocktail. They talk briefly, and then engage in passionate kissing. Whenever the gentleman caller puts his hands on the "lady's" breasts or genitals, "she" pushes his hand away. Finally, she slaps him coyly. The "lady" then apologizes for her aggressiveness by fellating her partner.

The "lady" then lies face-down on the sofa with her buttocks in the air. The gentleman caller then copulates the "lady" anally (although no penetration is actually shown). After a minute or so, the gentleman withdraws and sits back on the sofa. The "lady" gyrates her buttocks in the air. This induces him to mount her anally again. Both individuals reach orgasm, and the gentleman caller walks off camera.

The "lady" stands and raises her skirts to reveal that "she" is really a he. The film's second and final intertitle announces "Surprise." His penis is exposed. The man in drag then dances about briefly, making sure that his penis bobs up and down in the air. The gentleman caller re-enters the camera's view, and helps the other man remove his skirt and most of his other clothing. The gentleman caller (now completely clothed again) dances briefly with the nude young man. After a jump cut, the "lady"—now dressed completely in business attire—walks back on screen, winks at the audience, and walks off screen.

== Assessment ==
The Surprise of a Knight ushered in a brief period of homosexual hardcore pornography in the stag film era. About a year later, in A Stiff Game, an African-American male would engage in fellatio on a Caucasian man without the need for drag. The appearance of gay sexual contact on film would soon end, however, and not reappear until the advent of legal gay hardcore pornography after 1970.

Thomas Waugh and Linda Williams have argued The Surprise of a Knight is a film fraught with interpretational difficulties. Williams notes the lead character (the "lady") is in costume, yet costumes are the antithesis of the hardcore pornographic film (in which nudity and the display of genitalia and penetration during intercourse are key). "The costume spectacle either steals the show..." as film historian Thomas Waugh put it, "...or becomes a grotesque distraction..." The revelation of the "lady's" penis is not real surprise, Waugh concludes, as audiences knew what sort of film they were getting (i.e., homosexual porn).

The use of drag in The Surprise of a Knight also distances the audience from the performers on screen, Waugh argues. The main character of the film is a drag queen, and yet nearly all the audience members could say they were not drag queens. Waugh sees the film not depicting gay men on screen, but reaffirming heteronormativity and negative stereotypes of gay men and gay sex. John Robert Burger writes it is unclear from the film whether the visitor knows of the drag queen's gender before the encounter, and hiding the gender of the drag queen makes it "faux homosexuality". Burger also writes, The Surprise of a Knight is an exception to the norm of stag films, in which the receptive partner in same-sex anal sex is typically perceived to be victimized or punished.
