= A Free Ride =

Stag film (c. 1915)

- The full public domain film
- Directed by: "A Wise Guy"
- Produced by: Gay Paree Picture Co.
- Cinematography: "Will B. Hard"
- Release date: 1915
- Running time: 9 minutes
- Country: United States
- Languages: Silent film, English intertitles

A Free Ride, also known as A Grass Sandwich, is a stag film of the silent era, considered the earliest extant American hardcore pornographic movie. It depicts a motorist who picks up two women from the roadside and later engages in several sex acts with them. Although most scholars consider A Free Ride a 1915 film, some sources claim that it was produced later. The film's director used a pseudonym and the cast remained anonymous. The filming location is not known, although it may have been produced in New Jersey. Two contradictory theories have emerged regarding the identities of the cast: some sources suggest they were people with low social status, but others assert the opposite. The Kinsey Institute has a print of the film in its collection. A Free Ride was screened at the inauguration of the Museum of Sex. In 2004, Lisa Oppenheim, a New York–based artist, remade the film.

== Plot ==
A Free Ride's opening intertitle denotes the film's setting as "in the wide open spaces, where men are men and girls will be girls, the hills are full of romance and adventure". The film shows two women walking home together alongside a rural road. A wealthy male motorist in a right-hand-drive c.1921 Stutz Motor Car Company Model M Bulldog touring car arrives and offers them a lift. After some hesitation, the women accept his promise to behave properly, and sit beside him in the front seat. However, the man immediately kisses and fondles them, before they get underway.

Some time later, the man stops the car and steps out of sight into the trees to urinate, but the women follow and voyeuristically watch him, returning to the car as he finishes to conceal that they have done so. After his return, the women go the same spot themselves to urinate. He secretly follows, watches them, and becomes sexually aroused, also returning to the car before he is discovered. The women return to the car, and accept the man's offer of liquor.

The man asks one of the women to accompany him into the woods, and they masturbate each other while standing. The other woman becomes curious and follows them into the woods. Upon seeing them, she becomes sexually aroused and stimulates herself. Meanwhile, the man and the first woman have sex in the missionary position. Soon after, the second woman joins them and the man has sex with her doggy style. Later, they have a threesome, and one of the women subsequently performs fellatio on him. After finishing the sexual acts, they return to the car and drive away.

== Production ==
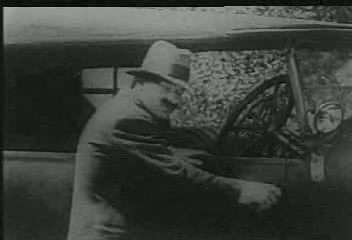
The actor wears a large fake mustache and a hat which led author Dave Thompson to conclude that the crew strove to make the cast unidentifiable.

British author Dave Thompson, in his book Black and White and Blue: Adult Cinema from the Victorian Age to the VCR, notes that D. W. Griffith is credited by one source as director on A Free Ride. But this claim is rejected by film historian Kevin Brownlow and Thompson himself. The identities of the cast are not disclosed in the credits (the title card says "starring the Jazz Girls"). Thompson asserts that the cast do not resemble identifiable contemporary silent film stars. He claims the crew strove to make the cast unidentifiable, noting that the actor wears a large fake mustache and a hat. When the actor's mustache became detached before the end of the film, he hid his face until the mustache was reattached. Thompson notes that some historical accounts, which he describes as "casual histories", have suggested that the cast of early pornographic films were drawn from among people with low social status such as the homeless, drug addicts, the mentally ill, prostitutes, and petty criminals. Thompson argues that there is almost no documentary evidence for this claim, and suggests that the actors likely had higher social status.

A Free Ride was shot outdoors. According to cultural historian Joseph W. Slade, there is a legend that it was shot in New Jersey. Most scholars, including Al Di Lauro, Gerald Rabkin and Jonathon Ross, believe that the film was produced in 1915 and is the earliest surviving American hardcore pornographic film. Los Angeles Times columnist Jay Jones notes A Free Ride is believed to be the first pornographic film made for commercial purposes. The 1915 production date is disputed by some sources. According to the Kinsey Institute for Research in Sex, Gender, and Reproduction, the film was made between 1917 and 1919. Film scholar Linda Williams also writes that the assertion that A Free Ride is the earliest surviving American stag film is "doubtful". Kevin Brownlow writes in his book Behind the Mask of Innocence that, "judging by the fashions, the film was actually made around 1923". Thompson says that the evidence presented to support the later production date is shoddy, but notes that some other experts agree with Brownlow's assertion. Evidence cited in support of a 1923 production date includes the similarity of one of the women's hairstyle to that of Mary Pickford, an actress who dominated American film industry during the 1920s. Proponents of the later date claim that the woman wore a Pickford-style wig. However, Thompson indicates that the curly Pickford-style hair became popular in the 1910s, citing a 1914 interview in Photoplay magazine in which Pickford said that she felt exhausted by incoming letters that inquired about her hair. Thompson further disputes the claim that the woman in the film was actually wearing a wig.

== Release ==
A Free Ride was reportedly first shown to its target audience in 1915. At that time, it was not possible to screen stag films in public theaters due to the Victorian moral views of contemporary society. Like other pornographic films of that era, A Free Ride was released and circulated underground to avoid censorship. It was likely shown in brothels, gentlemen's clubs, illegal gatherings of men in public places, stag parties, and other all-male venues: the film was kept hidden from society at large and the government.

== Critical analysis ==
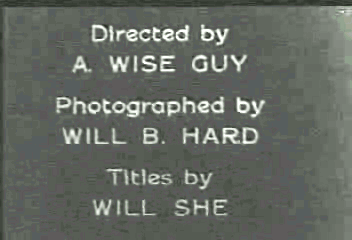
A Free Ride uses humor in its opening credits through false cast and crew names.

According to Williams, A Free Ride is a typological representative of a genre of early pornographic movies that included voyeurism. The film also shows sexual intercourse, fellatio, urolagnia, and urination from both sexes. Like the Argentinian film El Satario (c. 1907–1915) and the German film Am Abend (c. 1910), A Free Ride begins with simple narrative frames, then shows signs of more conventional cinema for a short period, and finally shows hardcore scenes in a fragmented manner. Author Laurence O'Toole has described early stag films such as A Free Ride as "a muddle of jerky camerawork and slipshod editing". Like other stag films from the 1910s, however, this film's quality is superior to the non-commercial pornography which preceded it.

Journalist Luke Ford writes that sex is given emphasis over story in A Free Ride. The film uses humor in its opening credits through false cast and crew names, such as A. Wise Guy as director, Will B. Hard as photographer, and Will She as the title writer. Williams describes this as "crude humor" and asserts it was common in American stag films produced from this time. Professor Frank A. Hoffman of University at Buffalo writes that the film's production standard indicates that there had been previous experimentation with stag films. O'Toole writes that despite the elementary nature of movies like A Free Ride, stag films became "rigidified into a restricted visual experience" in a short period of time.

Hoffman notes that A Free Ride contains many fundamental constituents which are the characteristics of an archetypal pornographic film. He identifies these basic constituents as a carefully planned but not complicated state of affairs to provide introductory motivation, visual stimuli to sexually excite the women, a theme that is generally rare in reality, a straightforward and very quick seduction, and the sex acts as the film's central theme.

== Reception and legacy ==
A Free Ride was a well-known stag film of the 1910s and, according to Williams, is regarded as a classic pornographic film. It is one of the three earliest pornographic films, along with El Satario and Am Abend, in the collection of the Kinsey Institute. The 1970 documentary film A History of the Blue Movie includes scenes from this film. The Museum of Sex in New York City showed A Free Ride at its 2002 inaugural exhibition. Lisa Oppenheim, a New York–based film director, remade the film in 2004 using no actors; instead the events of the film were represented by "the landscape and trees".

The film is featured in the 2022 horror film Pearl.

== See also ==
- History of erotic movies
