= Stag film =

Silent pornographic film genre

Stag films depicting actresses Doris Gohlke (left) and Ann Peters (right) performing striptease

A stag film (also blue movie or smoker) was a type of pornographic film produced secretively from the early 1900s to the late 1960s, when major Hollywood productions of adult films became mainstream. They were typically brief in duration (about 12 minutes at most), were silent, depicted softcore or hardcore pornography and were produced clandestinely due to censorship laws. Stag films were screened for all-male audiences in fraternities or similar locations; observers offered a raucous collective response to the film, exchanging sexual banter and achieving sexual arousal. Stag films were often screened in brothels.

Film historians describe stag films as a primitive form of cinema because they were produced by anonymous and amateur artists. Today, many of these films have been archived by the Kinsey Institute; however, most stag films are in a state of decay and have no copyright, credits, or acknowledged authorship. The stag film era ended due to the beginnings of the sexual revolution in the 1960s in combination with the new home movie technologies of the post-World War II decades, such as 16 mm, 8 mm, and Super 8 film. Scholars at the Kinsey Institute believe there were approximately 2,000 films produced between 1915 and 1968.

American stag cinema in general has received scholarly attention first in the mid-seventies by mainstream scholars, such as in Di Lauro and Gerald Rabkin's Dirty Movies (1976), and more recently by feminist and gay cultural historians, such as in Linda Williams' Hard Core: Power Pleasure, and the "Frenzy of the Visible" (1999) and Thomas Waugh's Homosociality in the Classical American Stag Film: Off-Screen, On-screen (2001).

== History ==
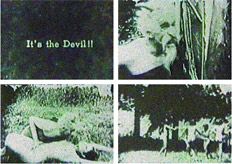
Some historians consider the Argentine film El Satario, filmed sometime between 1907 and 1912, to be the oldest surviving pornographic film.

Before the abolition of film censorship in the United States and a general acceptance of the production of pornography, porn was an underground phenomenon. Public presentation of such films were itinerant and were via secret exhibitions in brothels or smoker houses; or the films might be rented for private usage. Stag films were an entirely clandestine phenomenon; not until the "porn chic" era of the 1970s would sexually explicit cinema gain any recognition or discussion in mainstream society. Unlike today, the on-screen display of satisfaction, such as male or female orgasm, was not a convention of stag cinema. Instead there was what Linda Williams called the "meat shot", which was a closeup, hardcore depiction of genital intercourse. As there are no direct quotes or oral histories by participants in this underground cinema, film scholars understand what they know of these stag films mainly through written accounts. Stag films persisted for such a great length of time, as Williams argues, simply because they were cut off from more public scrutiny of sexual behavior.

The German film Am Abend, the Argentinian film El Satario and the American film A Free Ride (or A Grass Sandwich), produced between 1907 and 1915, are three of the earliest hardcore pornographic films that have been collected at the Kinsey Institute for Research in Sex, Gender, and Reproduction.

In the 1920s, France, Germany and the U.S. were some of the leading producing countries of stag films. By the 1930s, the U.S. became the largest stag film producer, with the UK and Denmark briefly taking the top position in the early 1950s and 1960s respectively.

== Study and analysis ==
=== Feminist critiques ===
==== Voyeurism ====
Voyeurism is an obvious theme and main fixture in the codes and conventions of stag cinema. Williams argues that many stag films, including Am Abend and A Free Ride, "incorporate voyeurism into their narratives as strategies both for arousing their characters and for matching the character's "look" with that of the spectator in their beginning sequences." She describes this as a way for the spectator to identify with the male who looks at the female's body within the unfolding narrative. Williams' theory on the discourse of the stag film is that "it oscillates between the impossible direct relation between a spectator and the exhibitionist object he watches in close-up and the ideal voyeurism of a spectator who observes a sexual event in which a surrogate male acts for him."

=== Queer theory ===
==== Homosociality ====
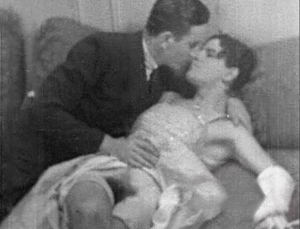
Screen shot from The Surprise of a Knight, a gay film that is part of the historical stag collection of the Kinsey Institute film archive

Professor Thomas Waugh wrote about stag films in the context of homosociality (i.e., same-sex relationships that are not sexual or romantic). He argues that this phenomenon ultimately succeeds in illuminating masculinity through the "symbolic phallus". In his essay, Waugh argues that "the stag films, both on-screen and off-screen, are tenaciously engaged with the homosocial core of masculinity as constructed within American society." Waugh points to the fact that in most cases, these anonymous male artists during the heyday of the stag film avoid showing male organs on-screen, yet off-screen is an all-male audiences with only male organs. In their history of the stag film, Di Lauro and Rabkin (1976) nostalgically speak of the stag film as a platform for social bonding and camaraderie between males. Both Williams and Waugh agree that there is a pressing need for the viewer to identify with the other men in the audience, to prove his masculinity through bonding with other male viewers, in order to escape the homosexual undertone of enjoying watching other men's penises. Waugh would argue that this mentality and this corpus of underground erotic film "exposes the spectrum of male sociality, the experience of having a penis, and being white during the first two-thirds of the 20th century." According to Waugh, stag culture was an arena in which homosocial behaviour reinforced masculinity in men's sexual desires in American pop culture. Waugh also contends that there are a few subversions in this dynamic, describing one film, the cartoon Buried Treasure (c. 1928), as an "overt interrogation of masculinity." Waugh also suggests that this behaviour is shaped by not only by censorship, but also through shame and disavowal.

== Filmography ==
- Le Coucher de la Mariée (Bedtime for the Bride or The Bridegroom's Dilemma), France, 1896
- Am Abend, Germany, 1910
- El Satario, Argentina, 1907–1915
- A Free Ride, US, 1915
- Le ménage moderne du Madame Butterfly, France, 1920
- The Casting Couch, US, 1924
- The Virgin with the Hot Pants, US, 1924
- Forbidden Daughters, US, 1927
- Le pompier des Folies Bergères, France, 1928
- "Buried Treasure" Featuring Eveready Harton, US, 1928–29
- The Surprise of a Knight, US, c. 1930

== See also ==
- Pornographic film
- Adult movie theater
- Amateur pornography
- List of pornographic film studios
- Music in pornography
- Pornographic parody film
- Pornography laws by region
- Sexually transmitted infections in the pornography industry
- Unsimulated sex
- X rating
