= Am Abend =

1910 film

- Release date: 1910
- Running time: 10 minutes
- Country: Germany
- Language: Silent film

Am Abend ([am ˈaːbənt], "In the Evening") is an early 20th-century German stag film which was made in 1910. Along with the Argentinian film El Satario (c. 1907–1915) and the American film A Free Ride or A Grass Sandwich (c. 1915–1917), it is one of the earliest hardcore pornographic films, produced between the years 1907 and 1915, that have been collected at the Kinsey Institute for Research in Sex, Gender, and Reproduction.

== Description ==
Like the other two films, Am Abend begins with a primitive narrative frame sequence, then it shows signs of a more conventional cinema for a short period of time, and it finally shows hard-core scenes in a fragmented manner. Film studies scholar Linda Williams suggested that early pornographic films, such as Am Abend, like modern-day pornographic videos, showed close ups of genitals and medium shots of sex. Thus, there were structural similarities between early stag films and modern-day pornographic videos.

The duration of Am Abend is 10 minutes. The film starts with an act of voyeurism, depicting a man peeping through a keyway into a woman's bedroom. In the room, the woman lies alone on a bed and masturbates for some minutes. Then, the man enters the woman's bedroom, undresses himself, the woman gives him a bath and the two partners engage in different sexual activities in multiple sex positions. The sexual activities includes the man penetrating from top, fellatio, further masturbation by the woman, and sex in the doggy style position. The sex, however, is stopped prematurely when the man suffers from erectile dysfunction. The hard-core scene in this film is shown in a master shot of the man and woman in their bed with inserted close-ups of the genitals, penetration, etc.
