= Am Sklavenmarkt =

1907 Austro-Hungarian pornographic film

- The film
- Directed by: Johann Schwarzer
- Produced by: Saturn-Film
- Release date: 1907
- Country: Austria-Hungary
- Language: Silent film

Am Sklavenmarkt (German: "at the slave market") is a 1907 short Austro-Hungarian pornographic film directed by Johann Schwarzer (1880–1914) at his studio Saturn-Film company. The film is 50 metres (160 ft) long.

The first image is taken from Am Sklavenmarkt.

== Story ==
A pasha sits on a mat on the grass in front of a round tent, smoking from his water-pipe, ready to buy some new slave girls. His servant calls the seller and his two henchmen, who bring forth four girls in patterned burnooses. The first is totally undressed and sent into the tent; the next girl gets topless and is also sent into the tent; the third is forced to undress by the henchmen and also sent inside. The fourth, apparently a younger girl, is dismissed by the Arab after showing her small, firm breasts, and she goes back with the henchmen. After a customary argument over the price, the slave master goes away happy.
