= The Bridegroom's Dilemma =

- Directed by: Georges Méliès
- Starring: Georges Méliès; Mlle. Barral
- Production company: Star Film Company
- Release date: 1899
- Country: France
- Language: Silent

The Bridegroom's Dilemma (French: Le Coucher de la mariée ou Triste nuit de noces) is an 1899 French short silent comedy film by Georges Méliès. It was sold by Méliès's Star Film Company and is numbered 177–178 in its catalogues, where it is advertised as a scène comique.

A surviving production photograph shows Méliès as the elderly beau in the film. Historian Georges Sadoul, from available evidence, believed the young woman to be Mademoiselle Barral, who starred as Cinderella in Méliès's film of the same name later that year. The film is a coucher (bedroom farce) in a popular style; several early filmmakers made similar farces, notably one from Eugène Pirou (Le Coucher de la Mariée, 1896) and at least three from Pathé (1901, 1904, and 1907).

The complete film is currently presumed lost. However, a flipbook published by Léon Beaulieu in the late 1890s, showing one woman helping another undress for bed before a gentleman in evening dress enters the bedroom, was rediscovered in the 2010s and has been tentatively identified as a fragment of the film.
