= El Satario =

Stag film (ca. 1907)

El Sartorio
- The full film
- Directed by: Anonymous
- Production company: Pathi
- Running time: 8 minutes
- Language: Silent

El Satario (Spanish: The Satyr), also known as El Sartorio or The Devil, is the name of one of the earliest surviving pornographic films. Based on the fashions and technology depicted, it was likely produced in Argentina around 1907, and includes possibly the first use of extreme close-ups of genitalia. One author has suggested that it may instead date to 1930s Cuba. It has also been suggested that the film is intended as a parody of Vaslav Nijinsky's ballet Afternoon of a Faun.

== Plot ==
While a group of nude young women are frolicking in the countryside, a satyr appears (called a devil in a titlecard), causing the women to flee. One of the women faints and is sexually assaulted by him, first in 69 position and then in various penile–vaginal positions, until he ejaculates in her vagina. The other women then return and start beating him, chasing him away.

== Release ==
The Kinsey Institute dates the film between 1907 and 1912. Journalist Kurt Tucholsky described in a 1913 article his experience viewing several stag films in Berlin, one of which has a similar description to El Satario.

== See also ==
- Le Coucher de la Mariée
- Am Abend
- A Free Ride
