= Albert Kirchner =

French photographer and filmmaker

- Born: 8 September 1860; Hamburg, German Confederation
- Died: 11 May 1902 (aged 41); Paris, France
- Occupations: Photographer, director, inventor
- Notable work: Le Coucher de la Mariée (1896)

Albert Kirchner (1860–1902), better known under the pseudonym Léar, was a French photographer, manufacturer, exhibitor, and filmmaker who is noted for producing several religious and erotic films. He was employed by Eugène Pirou, a French filmmaker and photographer. Kirchner directed the first known erotic film, 1896 Le Coucher de la Mariée (or Bedtime for the Bride), that featured actress Louise Willy.

== Film career ==
He also registered three patents for the film camera "Biographe Français Léar" in 1897–1898. He manufactured the camera by a company he himself founded along with two of his college-colleagues – Anthelme and Pacon. Kirchner produced and marketed two variants of "Biographe" — one for 35 mm film and the other for 60 mm film. In 1897, he arranged screenings at multiple locations that included the Oller Museum and the café Frontin in French capital Paris.

In partnership with Michel Coissac, who later became a well-known film historian, Kirchner directed the film Passion du Christ (The Passion of Christ) in twelve scenes in 1897. Shot in Paris, it was the first film made based on the story in the Bible. The film, 5 minutes long, was shown in a large number of regions. This film created influence among contemporary film directors and many of them adopted its theme. However some people were angry over the depiction of Christ. Passion du Christ made Kirchner the first filmmaker to direct a film about the life of Christ. Kirchner made Passion du Christ on behalf of a Roman Catholic publishing company, La Bonne Presse.

Researcher Stephen Bottomore in Who's Who of Victorian Cinema: A Worldwide Survey suggested Albert Kirchner may be the person behind Lear and Co., a company in Egypt's capital Cairo, which faced prosecution for exporting pornographic pictures to Europe in the year 1901. Assuming Léar is Kirchner, in 1898 in the basement of the Olympia Theatre, he created a cinema. That same year, Gaumont, a French film production company, bought all of his negatives. The cinema closed shortly after this and he died.
