= Otto Wegener =

Swedish photographer (1849–1924)

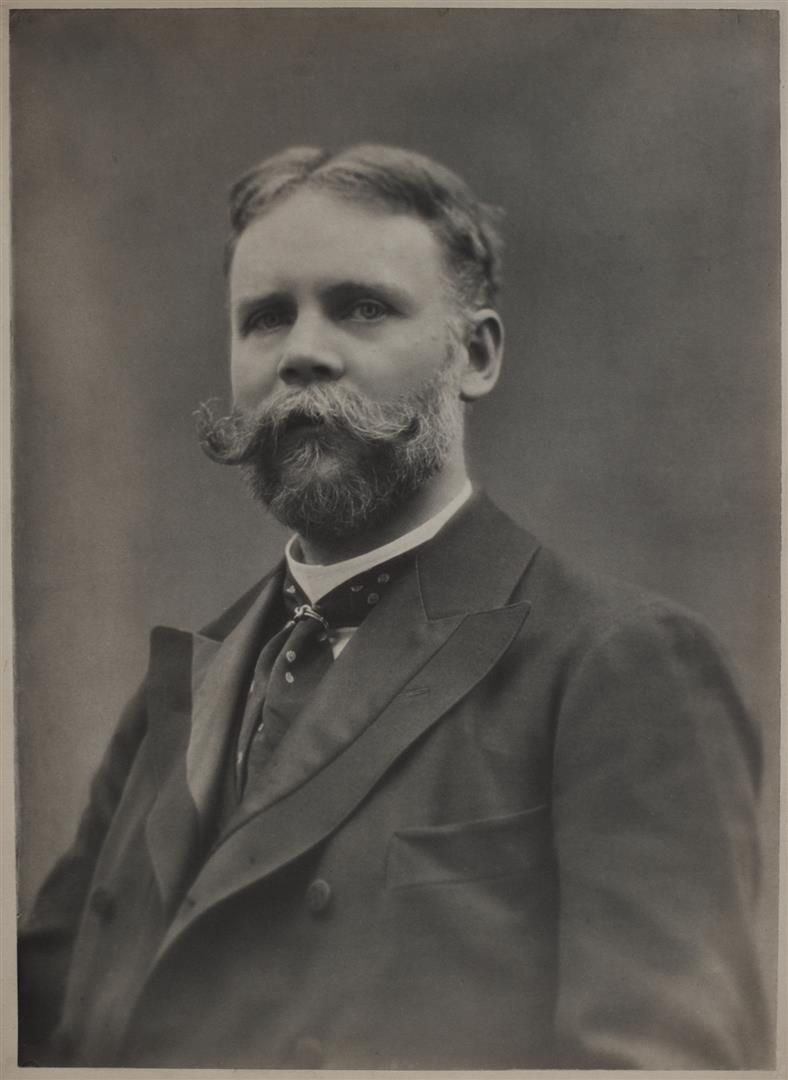
Self-portrait photograph (c. 1880)

Otto Wegener (20 January 1849 – 4 February 1924) was a Swedish-born French portrait photographer.

== Biography ==
Wegener was born in Helsingborg, Sweden and moved to Paris to open a photographic studio when he was eighteen. Where and how he learned photography is unknown. He quickly gained a reputation as a professional; specializing in photographs of cultural and entertainment personalities. He signed his works with "OTTO", in gold letters, to match the sign above the door of his studio. He eventually came to occupy four floors of the building.

He taught photography to Prince Eugen, Duke of Närke of Sweden and Edward Steichen was one of his assistants. He is most famous for his portraits of Isadora Duncan and Marcel Proust, who was also a friend, and Paul Verlaine, who posed in 1893 as part of his preparation to become a candidate for membership in the Académie Française.

He participated in numerous exhibitions; in France and abroad. A fire at his studio in 1916 caused significant damage. Although he knew the photographer Eugène Pirou, he was never professionally associated with him, as is often mistakenly assumed. The error came about after the brothers, Georges and Oscar Mascré, began using Pirou's name without his permission, and later advertised themselves as "Otto-Pirou", in an obvious reference to Wegener.

Although he was awarded two gold medals, he never mentioned them in his promotional materials. Most of his works were in "cabinet" format (14.5 x 10 cm) or larger. Very few are in the popular "Carte de visite" format.

He had three sons, including Maurice Otto Wegener, an aspiring artist who reportedly died in Paris, of physical and mental exhaustion, resulting from the war.

== Selected works ==
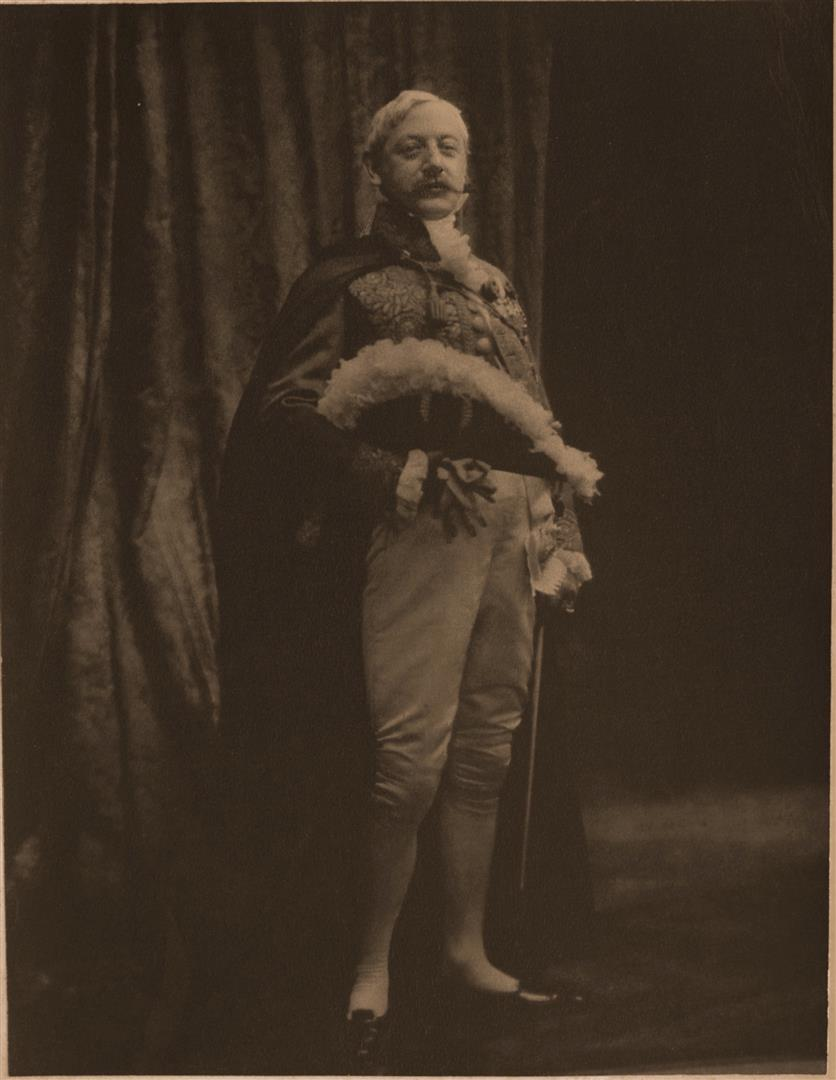
Boni de Castellane

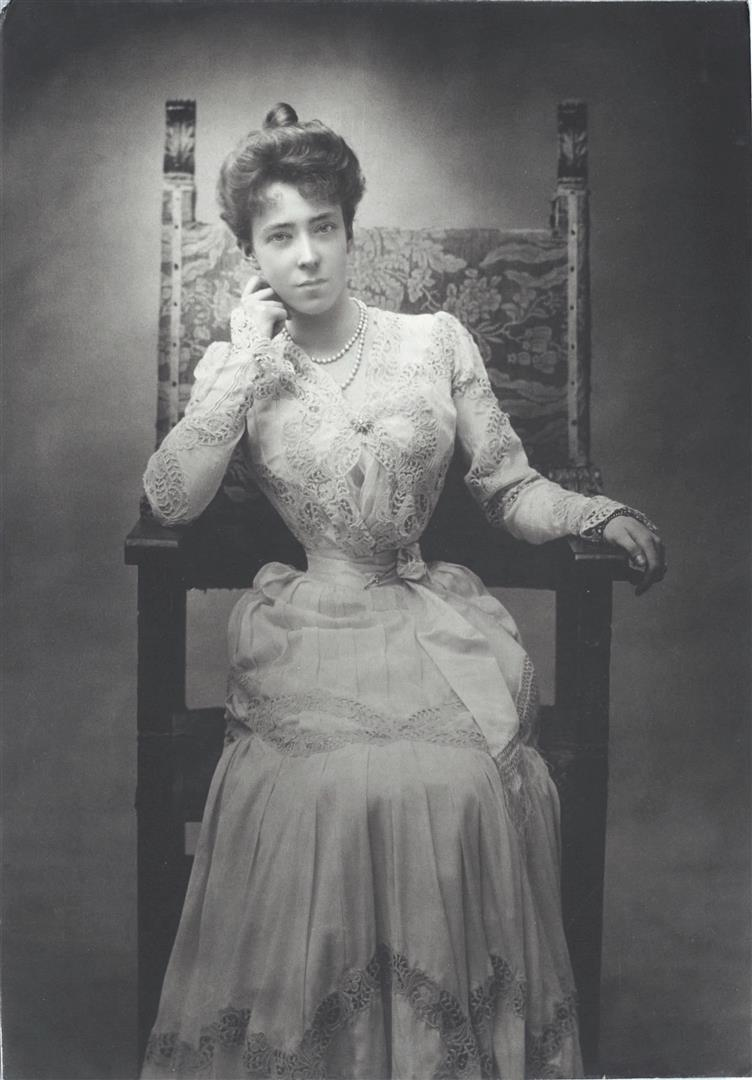
Elisabeth of Bavaria

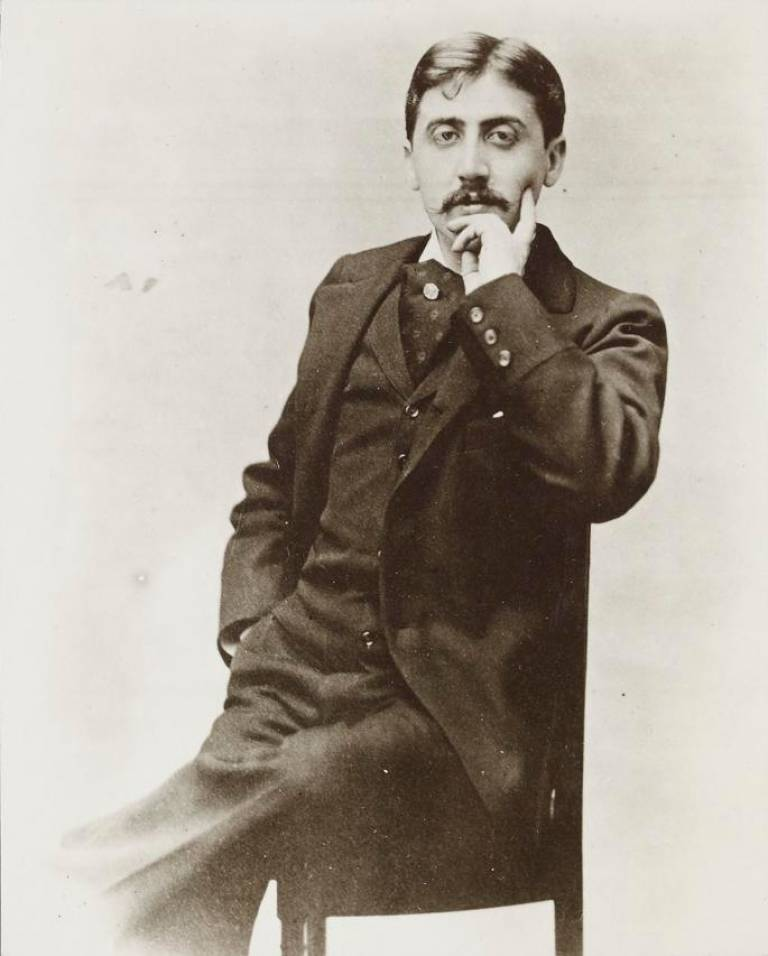
Marcel Proust

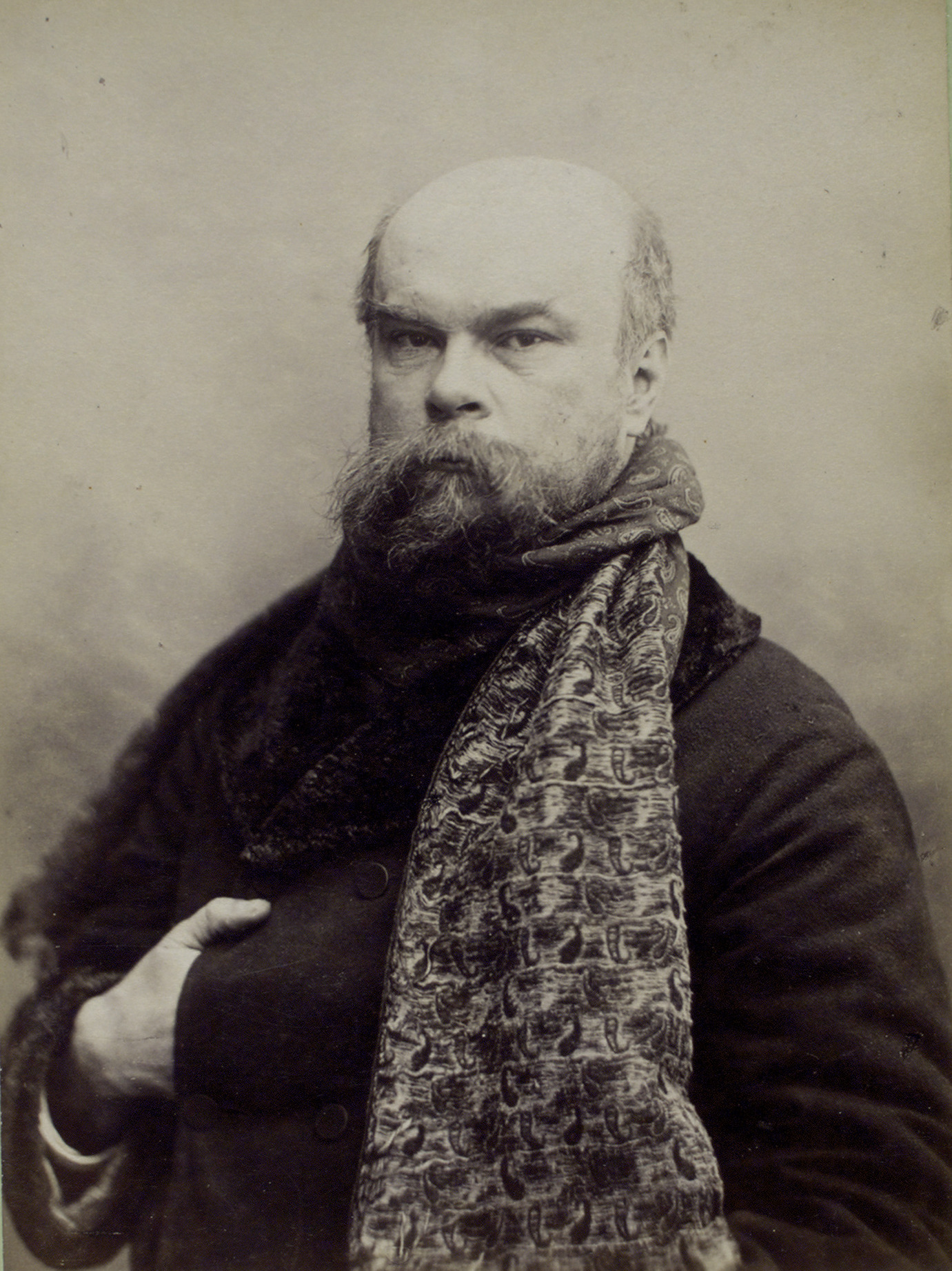
Paul Verlaine

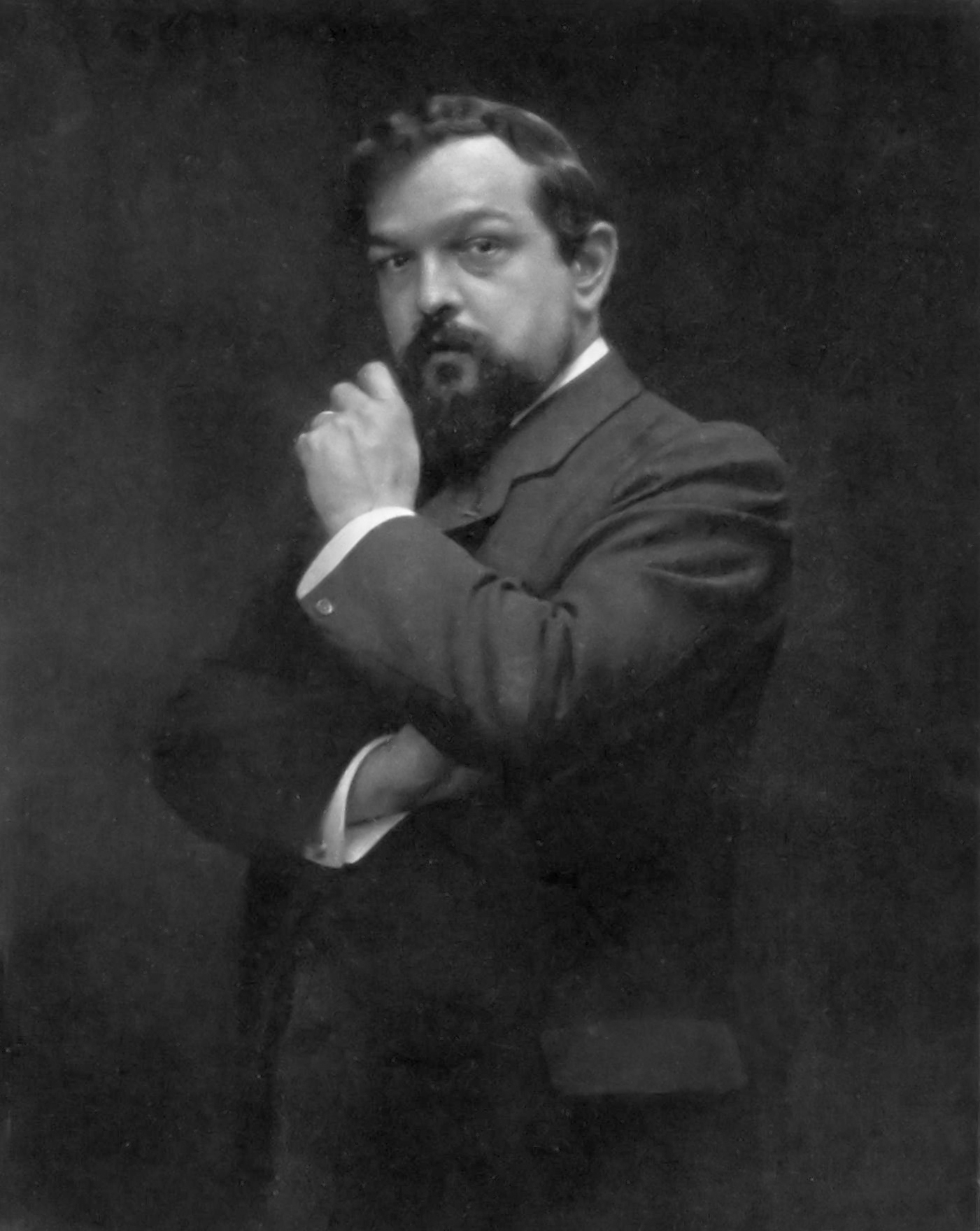
Claude Debussy

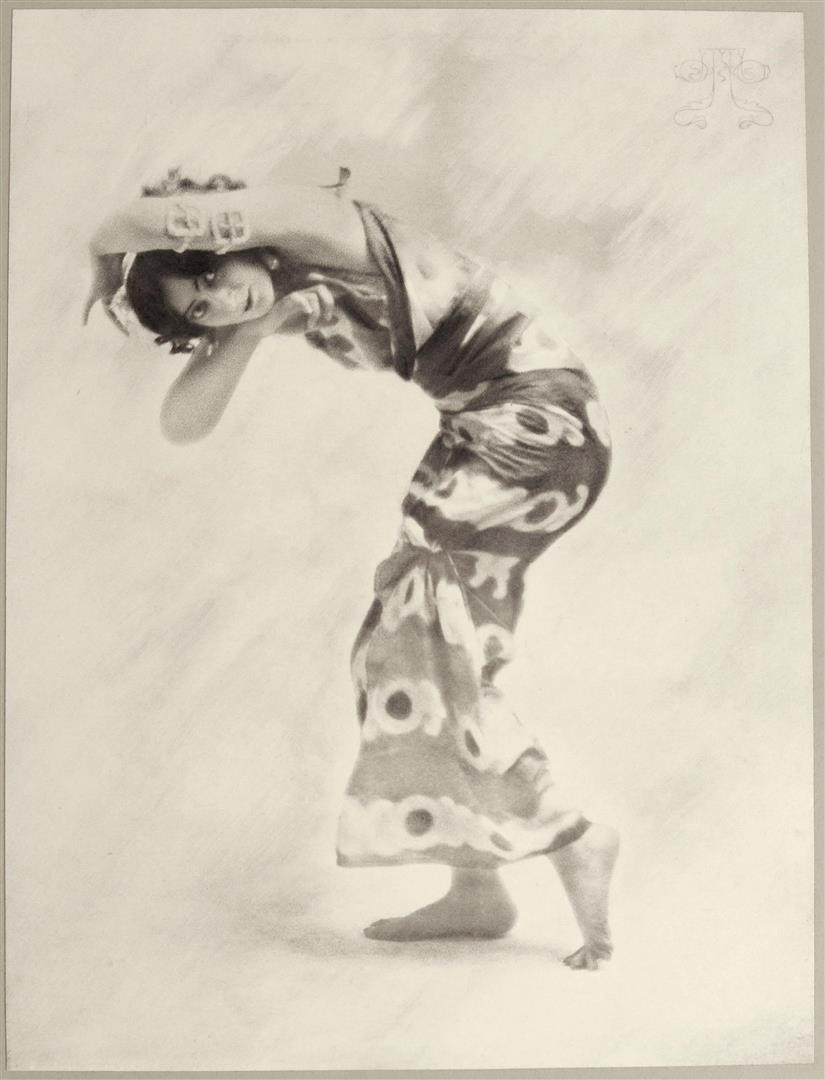
Ida Rubinstein
