= Dave Thompson (author) =

English writer (born 1960)

- Born: David Thompson; January 4, 1960 (age 66); Bideford, Devon, England
- Writing career
- Pen name: Dave Thomas
- Language: English
- Years active: 1980s–present
- Genres: Non-fiction, history, biography
- Subjects: Pop music, film, television
- Website: davethompsonbooks.wordpress.com

David Thompson (also Dave Thomas; born 4 January 1960) is an English writer who is the author of more than 100 books, largely dealing with rock and pop music, but also covering film, sports, philately, numismatics and erotica. He wrote regularly for Melody Maker and Record Collector in the 1980s, and has since contributed to magazines such as Mojo, Q, Rolling Stone and Goldmine.

== Biography ==
Thompson was born in Bideford in Devon, England. In the late 1970s, he wrote and published a punk rock fanzine. In the 1980s, he was employed by Richard Desmond's Northern & Shell in the London Docklands. He moved to the United States in 1989. Among many other music publications for which he has written are Alternative Press and Shindig!, as well as for the AllMusic website.

His first published book, U2: Stories for Boys (Plexus, 1985, under the pen name Dave Thomas), was the first biography of the band U2. His other book subjects include Depeche Mode, the Red Hot Chili Peppers, Phish, T. V. Smith and the Adverts, ZZ Top, Joan Jett, Perry Farrell, Patti Smith, Kurt Cobain, Deep Purple, Genesis, The Velvet Underground and Simple Minds.

Thompson has also written extensively on David Bowie, including the biographies Moonage Daydream (1987) and Hallo Spaceboy (2006), as well as the semi-fictional To Major Tom (2000). In 2004, Helter Skelter published his book The Psychedelic Furs: Beautiful Chaos. Thompson's book Black and White and Blue: Adult Cinema from the Victorian Age to the VCR was published in 2007 by ECW Press. In March 2018, he published the book The Incomplete Angler - Ten Years of Fruits de Mer, which chronicles the first ten years of British psychedelic folk record label Fruits de Mer Records, along with an extensive discography of the company's output.
