= Le ménage moderne du Madame Butterfly =

1920 film

Le Ménage moderne de Madame Butterfly
- Directed by: Bernard Natan (disputed)
- Starring: Bernard Natan
- Distributed by: Rapid Film
- Release date: 1920
- Running time: 6 minutes
- Country: France
- Language: Silent film

Le Ménage moderne de Madame Butterfly (Note: The "du" in the title is a clear spelling error. Another version of the title is Le Songe de Butterfly.) is a 1920 black-and-white bisexual, hardcore pornographic film from France. It is notable for being the earliest known adult film to incorporate bisexual and homosexual intercourse.

== Plot ==
The film is based on the opera Madama Butterfly by Giacomo Puccini.

Lt. Pinkerton is a strapping American sailor in Japan. He marries Madame Butterfly and ravishes her while Butterfly's maid, Soosooky (or Soussaki) watches and masturbates. Pinkerton leaves. A new character, Pink-hop "the coolie boy" (played by Natan), spies on Butterfly and Soosooky as they engage in lesbian sex. He masturbates while watching them.

Pinkerton returns, and is angered by Pink-hop's delay in opening the door. As punishment, he engages in oral and anal homosexual intercourse with the male servant. The violent intent of the punishment is mixed with humor (such as Pinkerton wiggling his buttocks at the camera). Pinkerton then engages in oral, anal, and vaginal sex with Soosooky. A new male character, Mr. Sharpless, meets with Butterfly and performs various sex acts with her before telling her that Pinkerton is a bigamist. Pinkerton, Soosooky, and Pink-hop return. Butterfly is angry, but soon succumbs to her lust for Pinkerton. All five individuals have sexual intercourse. Pink-hop engages in receptive anal intercourse with Pinkerton and Sharpless (Note: Waugh characterizes this as "enthusiastic".) while performing cunnilingus on the women. While having vaginal and anal sex with the women, Pink-hop also performs fellatio on Pinkerton and Sharpless. The film ends with Pinkerton waving at the audience.

There are two extant sets of intertitles, in French and English. The French intertitles are generally witty and humorous, poking fun at racism and American arrogance while making a number of double entendres. The English intertitles are far more crude and racist in tone.

== Background ==
Bernard Natan was a Romanian Jew who is claimed to have produced, directed and acted in at least one hardcore heterosexual pornographic film prior to 1920. In that year, at the end of World War I, Natan emigrated to France. Between 1920 and 1927, a group of at least 20 porn films appeared, sometimes attributed to Natan due to their internal coherence (a prolific number of films, considering the period and technology). Several of these films included homosexual and bisexual oral and anal intercourse, and Natan himself engaged in homosexual and bisexual sex on film.

Le Ménage moderne de Madame Butterfly is one of the earliest pornographic films attributed to Natan, and the first of these works to depict homosexuality and bisexuality. Although the release date is uncertain, scholars believe the film was distributed as early as 1920.

The production values on the film are notably high, even for a mainstream feature film of the day. It includes location shots of an Asian street full of rickshaws and a sailing ship on the Pacific Ocean. (Note: Slade characterizes this as "tourist footage".) The costumes and sets are almost lavish. The film has a lengthy and complex plot, and includes intertitles.

== Notability ==
Le Ménage moderne du Madame Butterfly is the oldest known motion picture to depict hardcore homosexual sex acts on film.

The first known motion pictures depicting nude men were made by Eadweard Muybridge in the 1880s and 1890s as part of his studies of human locomotion.

The first known pornographic film of any kind appears to have been made in 1908. Between 1908 and the advent of public theatrical screenings in the United States in 1970, about 2,000 hardcore pornographic films were made (with roughly 500 of these made prior to 1960). The best estimate is that about 10 percent of all hardcore "stag films" made prior to 1970 contain some sort of homosexual activity. This ranges from an innocuous hand on a shoulder, thigh or hip to hardcore anal and oral sex (and much more). Nevertheless, nearly all the extant works depict homosexual sex in the context of a heterosexual hegemony. Most depict homosexual sex occurring during heterosexual intercourse (essentially making the sex act bisexual in nature).

Le Ménage moderne du Madame Butterfly is unusual in that it not only depicts homosexual sex acts, but that it does so very early in the history of pornographic film. However, like most of the films which came after it, Le Ménage moderne du Madame Butterfly only shows male–male sex acts as deviant, firmly establishes the heterosexuality of the characters, and often depicts the sex acts as essentially bisexual (e.g., male–male sexual contact occurs while the men are also having heterosexual intercourse).

The film is also thought notable for being one of the first adult films to be produced or directed by Bernard Natan. Scholars have expressed surprise that a beginning filmmaker would produce a work which contained sex acts which might anger or offend the target audience (straight men). That Bernard would do so is a testament, film historians have said, to his willingness to take risks and his subtle understanding of the role homoeroticism and homosexuality play in French male sexual identity.

Within nine years of the release of Le Ménage moderne du Madame Butterfly, Bernard Natan would be the owner of the largest mainstream film studio in France—Pathé.

== Bibliography ==
- Burger, John R. (1995). One-Handed Histories: The Eroto-Politics of Gay Male Video Pornography. New York: Harrington Park Press. ISBN 9781560248606.
- Crisp, C.G. (1993). The Classic French Cinema, 1930-1960. Bloomington, Ind.: Indiana University Press. ISBN 9780253315502.
- Oscherwitz, Dayna; Higgins, Mary Ellen (2009). The A to Z of French Cinema. Lanham, Md.: Scarecrow Press. ISBN 9780810868755.
- Shimizu, Celine Parreñas (2007). The Hypersexuality of Race: Performing Asian/American Women On Screen and Scene. Durham, N.C.: Duke University Press. ISBN 9780822340126.
- Slade, Joseph (Summer–Fall 1993). "Bernard Natan: France's Legendary Pornographer". Journal of Film and Video: 72–90.
- Tarrant, Shira (2016). The Pornography Industry: What Everyone Needs to Know. New York: Oxford University Press. ISBN 9780190205119.
- Waugh, Thomas (1996). Hard To Imagine: Gay Male Eroticism in Photography and Film From Their Beginnings to Stonewall. New York: Columbia University Press. ISBN 9780231099981.
- Williams, Linda (1999). Hard Core: Power, Pleasure, and the 'Frenzy of the Visible'. Berkeley, Calif.: University of California Press. ISBN 9780520066526.
