= Le Coucher de la Mariée =

Le coucher de la mariée
- The film
- Directed by: Léar (Albert Kirchner)
- Produced by: Eugène Pirou
- Starring: Louise Willy
- Release date: November 1896
- Running time: 7 minutes (only 3 minutes survive)
- Country: France
- Language: Silent

Le Coucher de la Mariée (Bedtime for the Bride or The Bridegroom's Dilemma) is a French erotic short film considered to be one of the first erotic films ever made. The film was first screened in Paris in November 1896, within a year of the first public screening of a projected motion picture. The film was produced by Eugène Pirou and directed by Albert Kirchner (under the pseudonym "Léar"). It features a risqué striptease, but does not end in nudity.

== Content ==
Le Coucher De La Mariée (1896)

A newlywed couple is in front of their wedding-bed after their wedding. The husband goes into raptures in front of his new wife, who simpers. She then asks him to withdraw while she undresses and he puts a folding screen between them. She removes one by one the many layers of clothes she wears — a jacket, a dress, underskirts, sub-underskirts, and a blouse. The husband does not stay in place, sometimes mopping his brow, sometimes reading a newspaper, sometimes having lecherous looks above the folding screen. The actors send numerous glances towards the camera.

== History of the movie ==
The original film has been estimated to be around seven minutes long, but it had degraded to a poor condition in the French Film Archives until it was found in 1996. Only 3:46 minutes of the film have survived, which includes the undressing sequence.

The film was shot in a theater set, and featured actress Louise Willy who performs the striptease. It is the direct adaptation of a theater show with the same name and the same cast. The show was very popular at the time, at Olympia Theater (Paris). It was a pantomime, quite risqué, but still not explicit as the actress was not nude. However, because only less than four minutes have survived from the original seven minutes, it is impossible to see more than the striptease.

== Legacy ==
Le Coucher De La Mariée (1904)

Le Coucher De La Mariée (1907)

There were several imitators that followed, such as Le Coucher de la mariée ou Triste nuit de noces (1899).

Pathé produced at least 4 different versions of the film between 1897 to 1907, including two also with Louise Willy.

Despite its tame content, the film has in modern times been described (perhaps facetiously) as a "blue movie", "porn", a "stag film", and Pirou as the inventor thereof.

== See also ==
- El Satario
- List of incomplete or partially lost films
