= Eugène Pirou =

French photographer and filmmaker

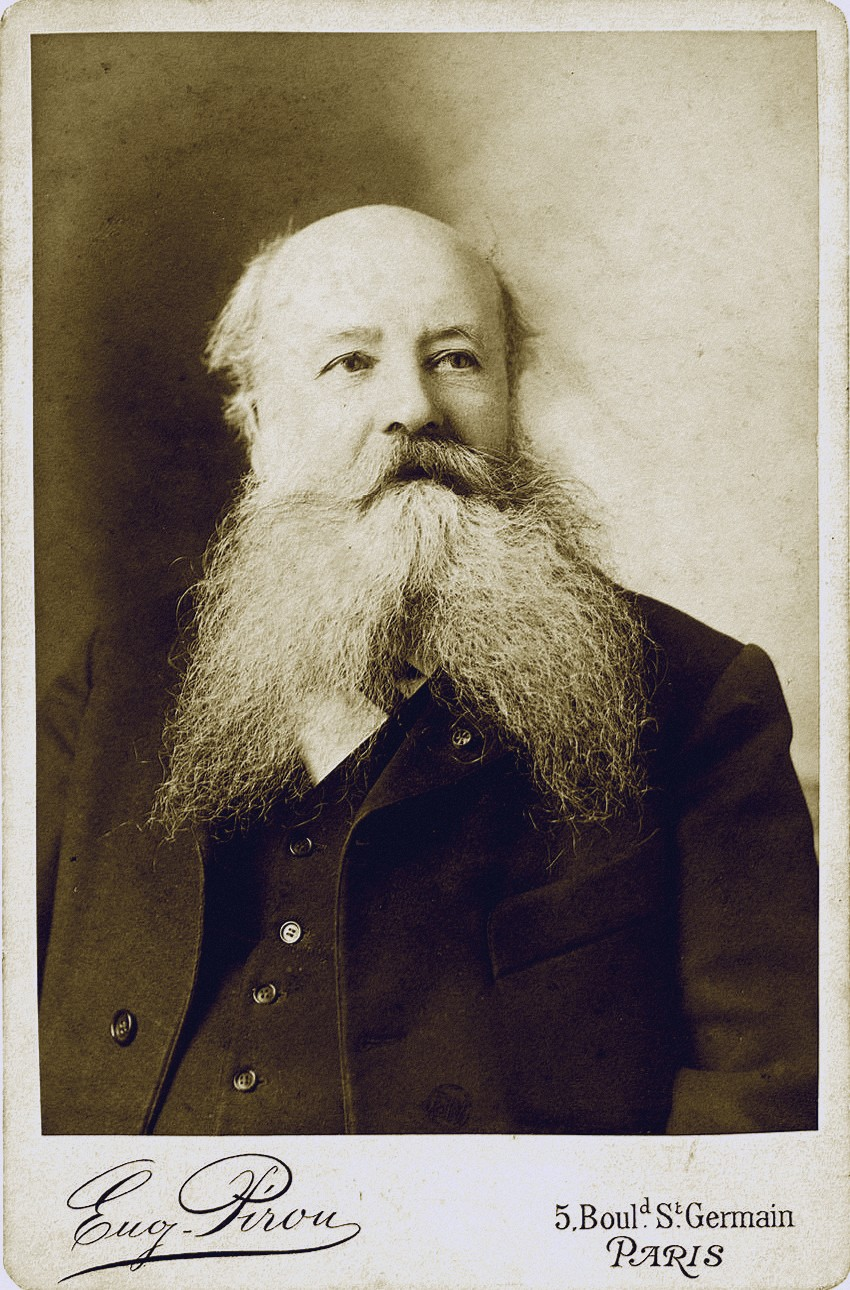
- Eugène Pirou Circa 1906
- Born: Louis Eugène Pirou; 26 September 1841; Saint-Michel-Tubœuf, France
- Died: 30 September 1909 (aged 68); Chaville, France
- Occupations: Photographer, filmmaker

Louis Eugène Pirou (26 September 1841 – 30 September 1909) was a French photographer and filmmaker, known primarily for his portraits of celebrities and scenes from the Paris Commune. He was awarded a gold medal at the Exposition Universelle of 1889.

== Life and work ==
He owned numerous studios in Paris, mostly on the Boulevard Saint-Germain, but he also operated one at an old evangelical mission on the Rue Royale. That one was sold to a photographer named Arthur Herbert, in 1889, with permission to use Pirou's name. In 1898, Herbert sold the studio to the brothers Georges and Oscar Mascré (1865-1943), who continued to use Pirou's name without his permission. Pirou lost a complicated lawsuit against the brothers, who compounded the fraud by referring to the studio as "Otto-Pirou", in reference to Otto Wegener, a Swedish-born photographer who was also not associated with them.

During the Exposition of 1889, he saw a presentation of chronophotography, given by its inventor, Étienne-Jules Marey. Not long after, he decided to pursue the new art of cinematography. He bought the necessary equipment in the summer of 1896 and, together with his employee, Albert Kirchner, who would later become a noted filmmaker in his own right, he filmed scenes of assorted events in Paris and showed them at the "Cinématographe Eugène Pirou" in the basement of the Café de la Paix at the Place de l'Opéra, with a projector designed by Henri Joly.

He and Kirchner later produced one of the first known erotic films, Le Coucher de la Mariée (generally called Bedtime for the Bride in English), starring an actress who went by the name Louise Willy. It was mostly a striptease. He also produced a short film about the Parisian visit of Tsar Nicolas II in 1896.

He was married twice. His first wife died in 1881 and his second in 1899.

Composers and writers photographed by Pirou
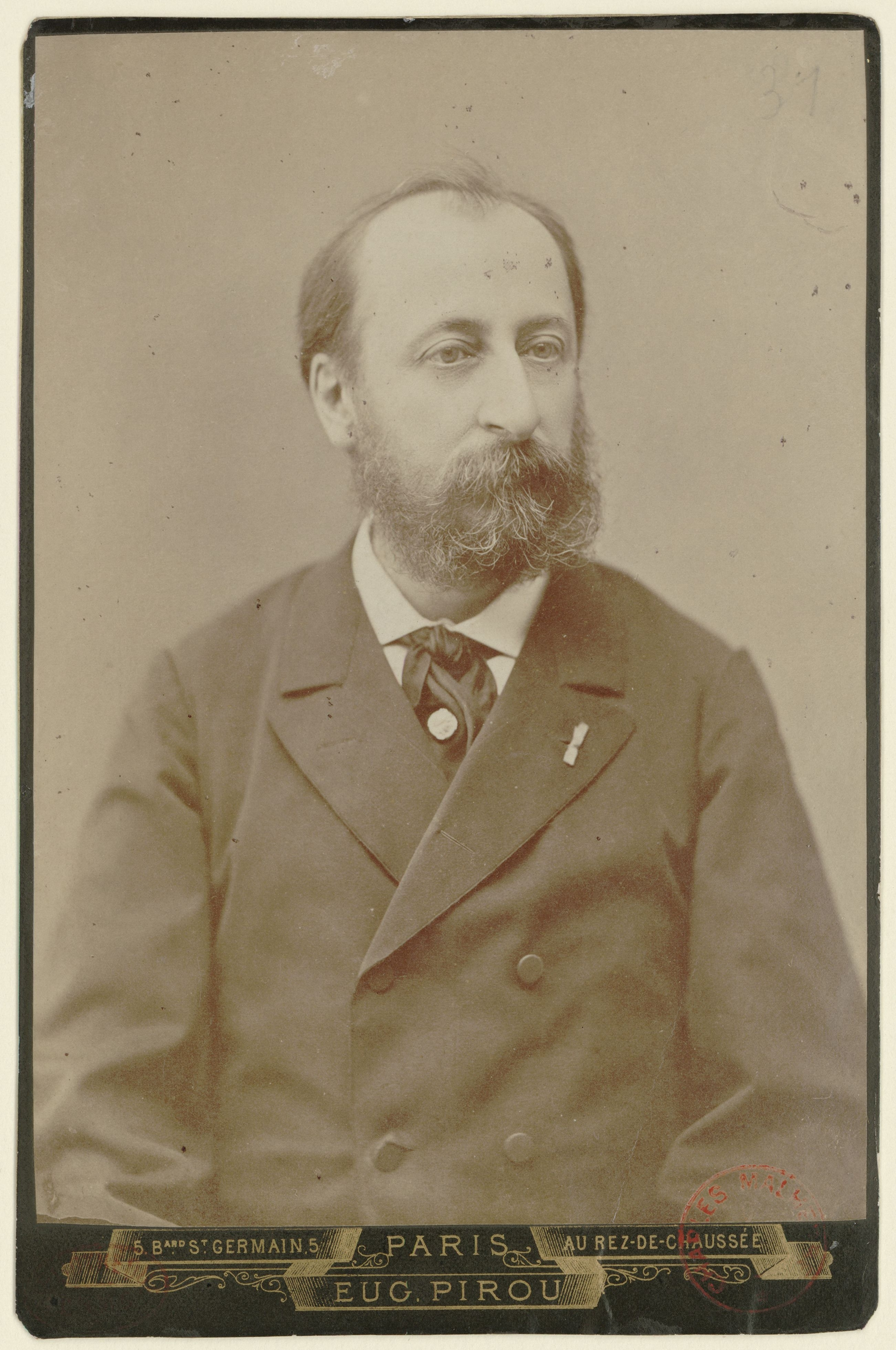
Camille Saint-Saëns

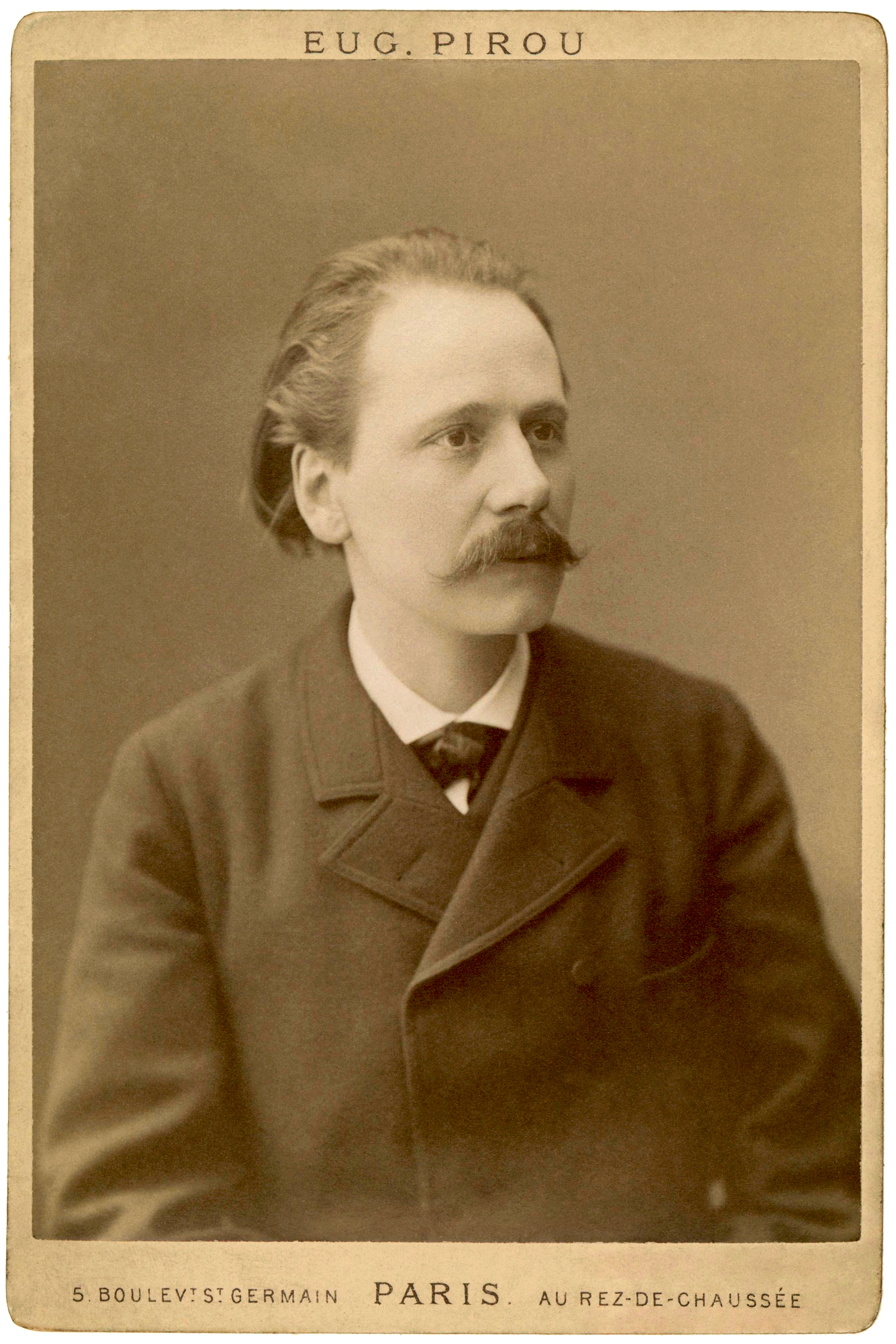
Jules Massenet

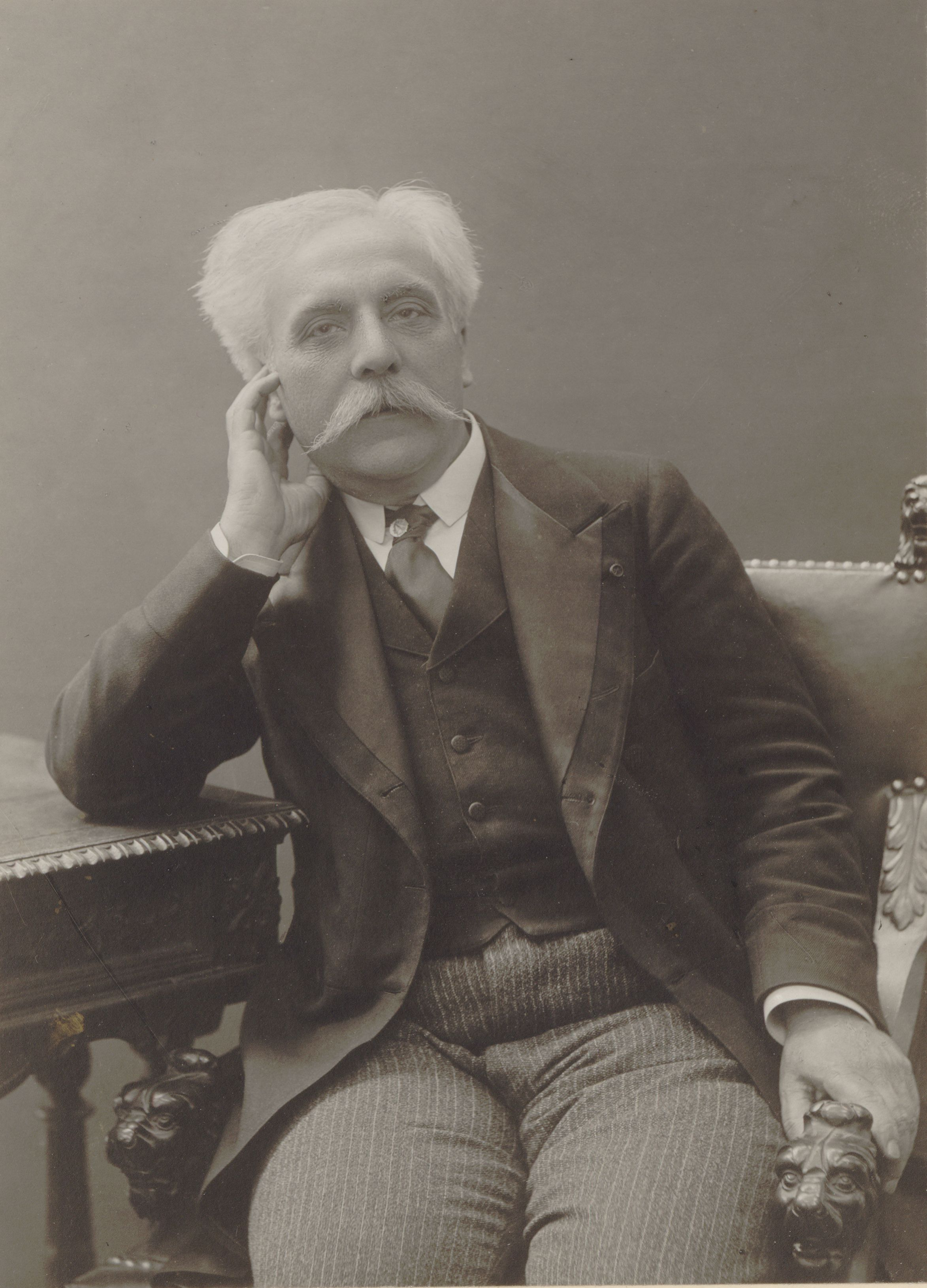
Gabriel Fauré

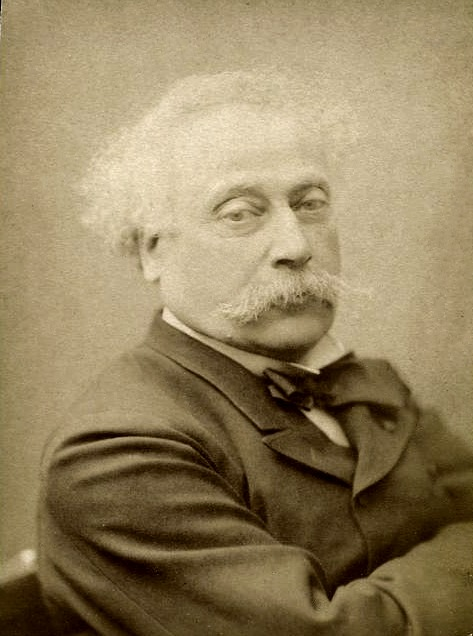
Alexandre Dumas
