= Louise Willy =

French cabaret artist and actress (1871–1931)

- The actress in c.1895
- Born: January 14, 1871
- Died: December 11, 1931 (aged 60)
- Occupations: Cabaret artist, actress

Louise Willy (born January 14, 1871) was a French comedian actor best known for her part in the film The Bride's Bed. She died on December 11, 1931, in the 10th arrondissement of Paris.

== Carrer ==
Student of the mime Charles Aubert, Alida Mercier made her debut under the name Louise Willy, at the Théâtre des Nouveautés in 1892 in a small role in La Bonne de chez Duval by Antony Mars. She also played in Hippolyte Raymond, and again at the Théâtre Moderne in Tous à la scène by Victor de Cottens and Paul Gavault.

She joined the Folies Bergère in 1894, in Fleur de Lotus, a pantomime by Armand Silvestre and Hugues Delorme. She was then signed with the Olympia and toured Cabourg and in Lyon, where she replaced Blanche Cavelli at the Théâtre de l'Eldorado. She acted in a scene taken from the play Le Coucher d'Yvette, also called Le Coucher de la mariée, a lyrical pantomime by Francisque Verdellet, with music by Eugène Arnaud. She was engaged at the Jardin de Paris where she performed Le Suicide de Pierrot. She then preformed the role of the Fairy in The Doll Fairy, Viennese ballet-pantomime by Josef Hassreiter and Franz Gaul premiered at the Olympia in October 1894.

In 1895, she appeared in the revue Les Turlutaines de l'année and in the pantomime Mauvais Rêve by Max Maurey, music by Rodolphe Berger, and triumphed at the Olympia in The Bride's Sunset, a pantomime by Gaston Pollonnais and Oscar de Lagoanére, where one sees his clothes fall one by one, and in the Parisian Bath.

Louise during a film in 1895 while preforming The Bride's Sunset

In 1896, she appeared in the erotic film The Bride's Bed, based on the play of the same name, a film used by Eugène Pirou.

In 1897, she created the role of Églantine in the ballet-pantomime Le Chevalier aux fleurs by Armand Silvestre, with music by André Messager and Raoul Pugno, at the Marigny Theatre.

Back at the Olympia in 1898, she acted in a revival of The Bride's Sunset; in Pierrot the Burglar; in Vision !, ballet-pantomime by Léon Roger-Millès set to music by Edmond Missa; in Crazy Loves; in Nero with Emilian of Alençon ; the role of Pierrette in Maurice de Marsan's The Seven Deadly Sins set to music by Henri Hirschman · as well as in the fairy-tale ballet Les Mille et Une Nuits by Max Maurey and A. Thierry in 1899.

She moved to the Parisiana in 1900 in a revival of Mauvais Rêve; at the Olympia in La Belle aux cheveux d'or, ballet-pantomime by Jean Lorrain, set to music by Edmond Diet, on May 2. She created the role of Julie in Moins cinq! a play by Paul Gavault and Georges Berr, at the Palais-Royal on November 22. In April 1901, she created the role of Gabrielle Vernis in the comedy Sacré Léonce ! by Pierre Wolff.

She left the theater to return to the music hall with roles in Paris-Cascades, a ballet by Auguste Germain set to music by Louis Varney at the Olympia in September 1901, and in Cendrillon, a fairy-ballet by Alphonse Lemonnier and Gardel Hervé set to music by Victor Rogeren in 1902.

At La Scala, she performed Burglary by Jacques Lemaire and Paul Fauchey in October 1902.

In 1903, she was hired at the Théâtre des Mathurins. There, she performed La Mumie, a pantomime by Henry Ferrare and Louis Aubert; the role of Laurida in Cœur jaloux, a pantomime by Henri Reine, music by Chantrier. In 1904, she played Prince Aurore in Victor de Cottens' revue des Folies Bergère, Praxiteles in Phrygnae with Cleo of Merode at the Olympia. In 1905, she performed in Caught in the Trap, a play by Théo, music by H. Rosès at the Capucines theater. In 1906, Josiane Eymard, play by Jean Lorrain at the Nouvelle-Comédie. René Debrenne hired her for the provincial tour to play the role of Cléo de Garches in Amour et Cie by Louis Forest. In 1907, she created the role of Delphine in La Lime, a mimodrama by Henry Ferrare (Note: Alice Montigny, in literature Henry Ferrare, daughter of Caroline Montigny-Rémaury, pianist, and niece of Ambroise Thomas.) on April 23, music by André Fijan, at the Moulin Rouge on April 23 which she revived at the Palais des Beaux-Arts in Monte-Carlo in 1909.

== Later life and death ==
After the release of her last film The Naked Man in 1913, her career was interrupted. After the war, probably considered too old to return to the stage, Louise Willy definitively left the spotlight and had to continue living by becoming a cleaning lady. However, she was not completely forgotten by her contemporaries since during the 1926 Paris population census, the census agent registered her under the name Mercier known as Willy at 22, rue Beaurepaire. In the 10th arrondissement.

Died unmarried at Lariboisière Hospital at the age of 60, Louise Willy left behind two brothers, Louis and Aramis, and a sister, Aline (1868–1955), who had also become a dramatic artist at the same time. (Note: Stage name unknown. There did indeed exist in the 1910s an actress named Marcelle Willy, but nothing allows linking her to Louise Willy's family.)
