= Johann Schwarzer =

Austrian photographer (1880–1914)

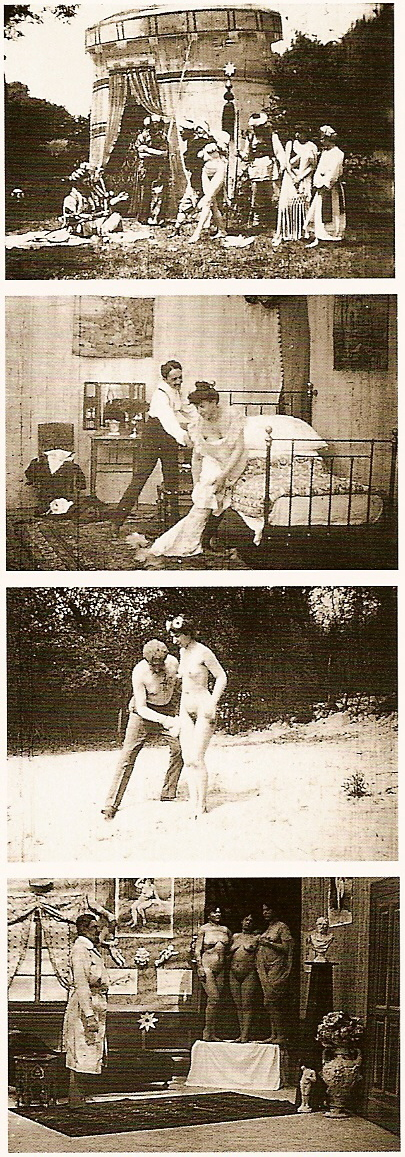
Johann Schwarzer movies

Johann Schwarzer (30 August 1880 – 10 October 1914) was an Austrian photographer and pioneer producer of adult films through his Saturn-Film (de) company.

Schwarzer was born in Javornik, then part of the Austro-Hungarian Empire and now located in the Czech Republic.

== Career ==
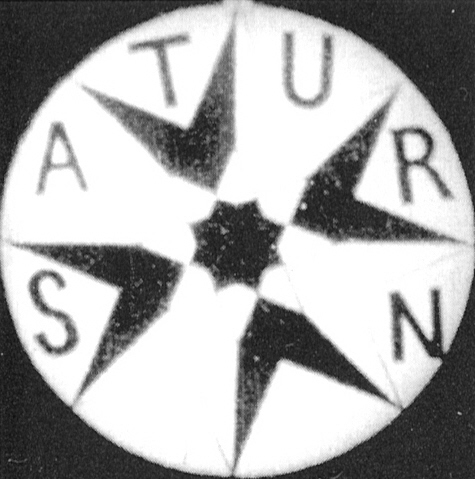
Saturn-Film logo, 1908

In the early 1900s, Schwarzer resettled in Vienna and became a portrait and family photographer and chemist. To supplement his income, Schwarzer began making erotic photos which were used on naughty postcards common to the era.

In 1906, he became interested in the men's-only theatre nights organized in Austrian cinemas that showed adult films, so-called Herrenabende ("night shows for men"). Seeing that money could be made from these types of films, Schwarzer organized the Saturn-Film company in 1906 to produce such films, in his Viennese roof-top studio, in competition to the French product then being exclusively shown. Before Schwarzer's productions, erotic films in Austria were supplied by the French Pathé brothers. Saturn-Film was the first native film production company based in Austria. Schwarzer produced and directed these erotic feature films, with basic plots (artist and model, bath scene) which allowed for voyeurism and female nudity but not, he insisted, pornography. Each film contained young local women fully nude.

Unlike his predecessors, Schwarzer conducted his business as a public company, advertising in local newspapers, motion picture trade journals and adding a logo to his films like any other European producer. Saturn-Film also published a regular film catalog within its first couple years of existence. Despite this effort, Saturn-Films often appeared shorn of their logos and rendered anonymous, like other, similar subjects once they got further afield of Vienna, possibly due to piracy, as the Saturn-Film logo appears as part of the film set, in all frames of some extent films.

In 1911, Saturn-Film was raided and closed down by the police as a part of a crackdown on erotic materials in Vienna. The authorities destroyed the main film vault which at that time consisted of 52 productions.

Censorship prevented Saturn from rising again. Johann Schwarzer tried to get a fresh start in film distribution, but without the ‘spicy’ films he had become famous for. After three months, he abandoned the effort and left Vienna for Africa. He resurfaced in April 1914, when he married the young Olga Emilie Jarosh-Stehlik. Schwarzer was an army reservist who was called up with the outbreak of World War I on 28 July 1914. He was made a second lieutenant by the time he perished in battle at Wirballen, Poland on 10 October of that year.

== Legacy ==
Saturn-Film consciously chose to advertise its films as being erotic, rather than pornographic. A quote from its 1907 catalog, probably written by Schwarzer, states "our films are of a purely artistic tendency, and we avoid tasteless subjects in favor of beauty." Schwarzer's adult films were more professional in quality then their French and Argentine counterparts and were the most widely distributed and popular adult films made in the first decade of the 20th century.

Despite the destruction of the main film vault in 1911 about a half of the 52 films produced by the company still exist in archives throughout Europe. Filmarchiv Austria has included four of Schwarzer's works in the Europa Film Treasures site; Das Sandbad (1906), Baden Verboten (1906), Das Eitle Stubenmädchen (1908), and Beim Fotografen (1908). Internet Archive has included over twenty of Schwarzer's works on their site.

== Works ==
This list is incomplete

- Aufregende Lektüre
- Baden verboten
- Beim Fotografen
- Das eitle Stubenmädchen
- Das Sandbad
- Der Angler
- Der Hausarzt
- Der Traum der Bildhauers
- Diana im Bade
- Die Macht der Hypnose
- Die Zaubereien des Mandarins
- Eine aufregende Jagd
- Eine lustige Geschichte am Fenster
- Eine modern Ehe
- Im Bade
- Jugendspiele
- Lebender Marmor
- Schleiertanz
- Sklavenmarkt
- Sklavenraub
- Vorbreitung auf das Rendez-vous
- Weibliche Assentierung
