= Black and White and Blue =

2007 book by Dave Thompson

Black and White and Blue: Adult Cinema from the Victorian Age to the VCR
- Author: Dave Thompson
- Language: English
- Subject: Erotic films
- Published: 2007
- Publisher: ECW Press
- Publication place: United States
- Media type: Print (Paperback)
- Pages: 301
- ISBN: 978-1550227918

Black and White and Blue: Adult Cinema from the Victorian Age to the VCR is a 2007 book about the history of erotic films by Dave Thompson. It was published by ECW Press.

== Reception ==
The book received favorable reviews and was described as a "highly readable account" by Tucson Citizen.
