= Linda Williams (film scholar) =

American film scholar (1946–2025)

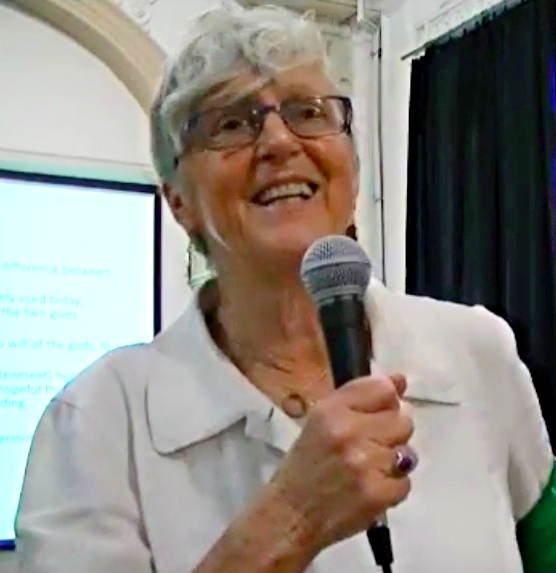
- Williams speaking in 2018
- Born: December 18, 1946; San Francisco, California, U.S.
- Died: March 12, 2025 (aged 78); Lafayette, California, U.S.

Academic background
- Education: University of California, Berkeley; University of Colorado Boulder
- Thesis: Figures of desire: an analysis of surrealist film (1977)

Academic work
- Institutions: University of Illinois Chicago; University of California, Irvine; University of California, Berkeley
- Main interests: Film studies
- Notable works: Hard Core: Power, Pleasure and the Frenzy of the Visible
- Website: filmmedia.berkeley.edu/faculty-profile/linda-williams

Linda Lorelle Williams (December 18, 1946 – March 12, 2025) was an American professor of film studies in the departments of Film Studies and Rhetoric at University of California, Berkeley.

== Life and career ==
Born in San Francisco in 1946, Linda Lorelle Williams graduated from University of California, Berkeley with a B.A in Comparative Literature in 1969, and then earned a PhD at the University of Colorado for her dissertation subsequently published as Figures of Desire: A Theory and Analysis of Surrealist Film. She taught at the University of California, Irvine, the University of Illinois Chicago, and finally, at Berkeley. Her main academic areas of interest were film history, film genre, melodrama, pornography, feminist theory and visual culture; all with an emphasis on women, gender, race, and sexuality.

With respect to film genres, she argues that horror, melodrama, and pornography all fall into the category of "body genres", since they are each designed to elicit physical reactions on the part of viewers. Horror is designed to elicit spine-chilling, white-knuckled, eye-bulging terror (often through images of blood); melodramas are designed to elicit sympathy (often through images of tears); and pornography is designed to elicit sexual arousal (often through images of "money shots"). Williams believes that much pornographic expression, and the form that expression takes, is due to the distance between the audience and the actual performers, and so, she concludes, much of what pornography becomes is a type of compensation for the distance between viewer and viewed.

Williams and her husband, Paul Fitzgerald, lived in Lafayette, California, and had one son. Williams died at home from complications of a stroke on March 12, 2025, at the age of 78.

== Professional experience ==
- Assistant Professor of English, University of Illinois, Chicago. 1977-83
- Associate Professor of English, University of Illinois, Chicago. 1984-89
- Professor, Film Studies, University of California, Irvine. 1989-97

Acting Director, Winter 1993
Director, Summer 1994 and Spring 1996

- Professor of Film Studies and Rhetoric, University of California, Berkeley. 1997–20??

Director of Program in Film Studies, July 1999-20??

== Selected honors and awards ==
- 1989 Katherine Singer Kovács Prize in Film, TV, and Video Studies for essay Fetishism and the Visual Pleasure of Hard Core: Marx, Freud and the 'Money Shot'; and finalist for the best book in Cinema Studies: both the Jay Leyda Prize and the Kovacks Prize (for Hard Core)
- 2004 Distinguished Teaching Award, UC Berkeley
- 2004-2005 Humanities Research Fellowship, UC Berkeley
- 2011 Faculties Research Lecture, UC Berkeley
- 2012 Katherine Singer Kovács Prize for "'Cluster Fuck': The Forcible Frame in Errol Morris' Standard Operating Procedure."
- 2013 Society for Cinema and Media Studies Career Achievement Award
- 2014 Carol D. Soc Distinguished Graduate Student Mentoring Award, UC Berkeley
- Class of 1940, Second Chair: UC Berkeley.

== Writings ==
=== Author ===
- Figures of Desire: A Theory and Analysis of Surrealist Film, University of Illinois Press, 1981. Paperback edition: University of California Press, 1992, ISBN 0-520-07896-9
- Hard Core: Power, Pleasure and the Frenzy of the Visible (University of California Press, 1989). Expanded Paperback Edition: University of California Press, 1999, ISBN 0-520-21943-0
- Playing the Race Card: Melodramas of Black & White from Uncle Tom to O.J.Simpson, Princeton University Press, Paperback edition, 2002, ISBN 0-691-10283-X
- Screening Sex, Duke University Press, 2008, ISBN 978-0-8223-4285-4
- On The Wire, Duke University Press, 2014, ISBN 978-0822357179

=== Editor ===
- Revision: Essays in Feminist Film Criticism. Coedited with Mary Anne Doane and Patricia Mellencamp, American Film Institute Monograph Series Frederick Maryland: University Publications of America, 1984. ISBN 0890935866
- Viewing Positions: Ways of Seeing Film. Edited. New Brunswick: Rutgers University Press, 1994. ISBN 0-8135-2133-5
- Reinventing Film Studies. Co-edited anthology with Christine Gledhill. London: Edward Arnold. New York: Oxford University Press, 2000. ISBN 0-340-67723-6
- Porn Studies. Durham: Duke University Press, 2004. ISBN 0-8223-3312-0

=== Journal articles ===
- Williams, Linda. "Film Bodies: Gender, Genre, and Excess." Film Quarterly 44, no. 4 (1991): 2-13. doi:10.2307/1212758.
- Williams, Linda (Winter 1993). "A provoking agent: the pornography and performance art of Annie Sprinkle". Social Text. 37 (37): 117–133. doi:10.2307/466263. JSTOR 466263.
- Williams, Linda (Autumn 2004). "Why I did not want to write this essay". Signs: Journal of Women in Culture and Society. 30 (1): 1264–1271. doi:10.1086/422234. S2CID 144733994.
- Williams, Linda (Fall 2005). "'White Slavery' versus the Ethnography of 'Sexworkers': Women in Stag Films at the Kinsey Archive". The Moving Image. 5 (2): 107–134. doi:10.1353/mov.2005.0039.
- Williams, Linda (January 2014). "Pornography, porno, porn: thoughts on a weedy field". Porn Studies. 1 (1–2): 24–40. doi:10.1080/23268743.2013.863662.
