= Titra Studios =

American dubbing studio

- Type: Private
- Industry: Dubbing
- Founded: 1960s, Paris
- Defunct: 1980s
- Headquarters: Manhattan
- Area served: International

Titra Studios (also referred to as Titra Sound Corporation and later known as Titan Productions) was an American dubbing studio. The studio was responsible for dubbing numerous foreign films, including Mothra vs. Godzilla (1964) as well as the Speed Racer anime series and the original Ultraman TV series. Among the many actors who worked for the studio were Peter Fernandez and the future Barney Miller star Hal Linden.

Titra was founded as a subtitling company in Paris. It had offices in Manhattan where it re-recorded films for companies ranging from minor distributors to major studios. It was used by film distributors that included American International Pictures and Walter Reade Organization, favored as the dubbing company for the Godzilla franchise for release in the United States.

In 1965, it was considered the largest dubbing company in the United States. Titra changed its name to Titan Productions in the late 1960s or early 1970s and stopped dubbing films altogether around 1980.

== Filmography ==
Year	Title	Notes	Ref
1958	The Idiot	Dubbed in 1960. Leading woman voiced by Joyce Gordon	
1961	Alakazam the Great		
1961	Black Sunday		
1964	A Fistful of Dollars	Voiced by Peter Fernandez	
1964	Black Sabbath	Also involved in pre-production as film was planned release in multiple languages.	
1964	Behind the Nudist Curtain		
1965	The Prince and the Nature Girl		
1966	Godzilla vs The Sea Monster		
1968	War and Peace (film series)		
