= Barlen =

Barlen may refer to:

- Bob Barlen (born 1980), Canadian screenwriter and producer
- Barlen Pyamootoo (born 1960), Mauritian filmmaker and writer
- Barlen Vyapoory (born 1945), Mauritian politician and diplomat who served as the fifth Vice President of Mauritius
- Arthur, Ann, and Det. Bill Barlen, characters in 1970 American sexploitation film The Amazing Transplant
