= A Hypnotist at Work =

- Directed by: Georges Méliès
- Production company: Star Film Company
- Release date: 1897
- Country: France
- Language: Silent

Le Magnétiseur, sold in the United States as A Hypnotist at Work and in Britain as While Under a Hypnotist's Influence, is an 1897 French silent trick film by Georges Méliès. It was sold by Méliès's Star Film Company and is numbered 129 in its catalogues.

The film is one of a small group of risqué "mature subjects" (i.e. stag films) Méliès made around this time; others included Peeping Tom at the Seaside, A Private Dinner, and After the Ball. A Hypnotist at Work is currently presumed lost.
