= Peeping Tom at the Seaside =

- Directed by: Georges Méliès
- Production company: Star Film Company
- Release date: 1897
- Country: France
- Language: Silent

Peeping Tom at the Seaside (French: L'Indiscret aux bains de mer) is an 1897 French short silent film by Georges Méliès. It was sold by Méliès's Star Film Company and is numbered 113 in its catalogues.

The film is one of a small group of risqué "mature subjects" (i.e. stag films) Méliès made around this time; others included A Private Dinner, After the Ball, and A Hypnotist at Work. Peeping Tom at the Seaside is currently presumed lost.
