= Satan Was a Lady =

Satan Was a Lady can refer to:

- Satan Was a Lady (1975 film), a pornographic film directed by Doris Wishman
- Satan Was a Lady (2001 film), a drama film directed by Doris Wishman
