= Mary Thorne (disambiguation) =

Mary Thorne (1740s–1810s) was one of the first women to have a leadership role in the Methodist movement in the United States.

Mary Thorne may also refer to:

- Mary Thorne, in the US 1970 sexploitation film The Amazing Transplant, played by Sandy Eden
- Mary Thorne, in the novel Doctor Thorne
