= Zilla and Zoe =

2019 comedy film directed by Jessica Scalise

- Film poster
- Directed by: Jessica Scalise
- Written by: Jessica Scalise
- Produced by: Jessica Scalise
- Starring: Greg James; Aida Valentine; Sam Kamerman; Kurt Conroyd; Mia Allen
- Cinematography: D. Sean Brown
- Music by: James Sizemore
- Production company: Scalise Pictures
- Distributed by: Indican Pictures
- Release date: May 17, 2019
- Running time: 104 minutes
- Country: United States
- Language: English
- Box office: $39,003

Zilla and Zoe is a 2019 American comedy film written, produced, and directed by Jessica Scalise. The film was distributed by Indican Pictures and had a limited theatrical release in the United States on May 17, 2019.

== Plot ==
Zoe, a 10-year-old girl, is obsessed with horror movies and is trying to shoot her own film to enter a contest. When her father forbids her from doing horror movies and forces her to shoot her sister's wedding ceremony, Zoe decides to turn the ceremony itself into a horror movie in order to win the contest.

== Cast ==
- Greg James as Sal
- Aida Valentine as Zoe
- Sam Kamerman as Zilla
- Kurt Conroyd as Oscar
- Mia Allen as Lu

== Release ==
=== Reception ===
Zilla and Zoe won Best Picture and Best Comedy at the Oregon Independent Film Festival. It also won the Audience Choice Award for Best Film at the Seattle Local Sightings Film Festival.

Kimber Myers from the Los Angeles Times wrote: "'Zilla and Zoe' eventually gets to a message of love and acceptance, but you have to slog through some real cruelty from the girls’ father to get to that point....There's something special here, but it's surrounded by drudgery."
