= A Private Dinner =

- Directed by: Georges Méliès
- Production company: Star Film Company
- Release date: 1897
- Country: France
- Language: Silent

A Private Dinner (French: En cabinet particulier) is an 1897 French short silent film by Georges Méliès. It was sold by Méliès's Star Film Company and is numbered 127 in its catalogues.

The film is one of a small group of risqué "mature subjects" (i.e. stag films) Méliès made around this time; others included Peeping Tom at the Seaside, A Hypnotist at Work, and After the Ball. A Private Dinner is currently presumed lost.
