= Each Time I Kill =

- Directed by: Doris Wishman
- Written by: Dawn Whitman
- Produced by: Michael Bowen
- Starring: Tiffany Paralta; Rob Vidal; Linnea Quigley; Lisa Ferber; Jackie Gold
- Cinematography: C. Davis Smith
- Edited by: Michael Hargett; Luigi Manicottale
- Music by: James Sizemore
- Release date: March 30, 2007
- Running time: 82 minutes
- Country: United States
- Language: English

Each Time I Kill is the final film that was written and directed by Doris Wishman. It was shot in 2002 shortly before Wishman's death from lymphoma, and post-production on the teen horror thriller was completed in October 2006. Tiffany Paralta stars as Ellie Saunders, a shy high school senior who finds a magical locket which will allow her to exchange one physical feature with anyone she murders.

The director of photography was longtime Wishman collaborator C. Davis Smith, and cameo appearances were made by The B-52's frontman Fred Schneider and scream queen Linnea Quigley.

Each Time I Kill received its world premiere on March 30, 2007, at the New York Underground Film Festival and was also selected by the Philadelphia International Gay & Lesbian Film Festival.

== Cast ==
- Tiffany Paralta as Ellie Saunders
- Rob Vidal as Don Adams
- Lisa Ferber as Kate Baxter
- Jacqui Holland as Susan Chambers (credited as Jacqueline Goldhagen)
- Melissa Perez as Cindy
- Bill Perlach as Angelo Barretti
- Laudet Torres as Tildi McGuire
- Chrissi Ardito as Mary Chambers
- Neeta Behl as Chela Fernandez
- Howard Elfman as Aaron Chambers
- Ivan Lopez as Steve Kaminski
- Madelin Marchant as Molly Saunders
- Hannah Matzkin as Trudy Statler
- Jessica K. Peterson as Lily Baxter (credited as Jessica Peterson)
- Linnea Quigley as Aunt Belle
- Kwame Riley as Bill Murphy
- Fred Schneider as Tom Saunders
- Biali Badaski as Father Donovan
- Gabriela Banus as Annie "Little Annie" Gerald
- Jose A. Cisneros as Sheriff Purdy
- David Dillon as Corky
- Cynthia Duvall as Beth Meadows
- David Frisch as Simeon Beetle
- Josue Gutierrez as Nick Sommers
- Ernest Heinz as Tim Meadows
- Jim Hollenbaugh as Hiriam Quacker
- Michael Kaufman as Timmy Baxter
- Julio Naranja as Sid Letterman
- Jose Prendes as Bill Sanchez
- Nancy Rogan as Tessie
- Glenn Shelhamer as Chuck Bryant
- Marielva Sieg as Miss Carr
- C. Davis Smith as Serh Turkin
- Mark Whittington as Tony
- Sabrina Wong as Nita Fernandez
