= Hideout in the Sun =

- Theatrical release poster
- Directed by: Lazarus L. Wolk; Doris Wishman (unbilled)
- Written by: Doris Wishman
- Produced by: Doris Wishman, Martin Caplan
- Starring: Greg Conrad; Dolores Carlos; Earl Bauer
- Cinematography: Lazar
- Edited by: Paul Falkenberg (as Victor F. Paul)
- Music by: Song 'Hideout in the Sun' by Judith J. Kushner
- Production companies: Wica Pictures, Inc.
- Release date: February 1960
- Running time: approx. 70 minutes
- Country: United States
- Language: English
- Budget: $10,000

Hideout in the Sun is a 1960 American nudist film directed by Doris Wishman and Larry "Lazarus" Wolk and starring Greg Conrad, Dolores Carlos and Earl Bauer. Produced by Wishman and Martin Caplan, it was the director's debut feature. She would go on to make numerous sexploitation films.

== Plot ==
Brothers Duke and Steve Martin hold up a bank. Their escape plans go awry, however, and they kidnap Dorothy and force her to hide them at her members-only nudist camp. Steve and Dorothy spend the afternoon mingling with the camp's patrons and Steve grows increasingly fond of both Dorothy and of nudism. In order to protect her, Steve convinces Duke to flee the camp with him. After an argument, Duke knocks Steve unconscious and escapes with their ill-gotten gains into the Miami Serpentarium, a roadside attraction. Alerted by a clerk, a policeman arrives to arrest Duke, who is bitten by a king cobra and dies. Meanwhile, Steve returns to the nudist camp, proclaims his love for Dorothy, and awaits his arrest. Dorothy promises to wait for his release.

== Cast ==
- Greg Conrad as Duke Martin
- Dolores Carlos as Dorothy Courtney, who also appeared in Diary of a Nudist (1961)
- Earl Bauer as Steve Martin
- Carol Little as Betty
- Ann Richards as Ann
- Mary Jane Line as Mary
- Pat Reilly as Pat
- Fran Stacey as Fran
- Dick Falcon as Dick
- Richard Schmitz as George
- Olivia Ann Line as Olivia
- John C. Line as John
- Paul C. Line as Paul
- Walter Film as Rodriquez

== Reception ==
The movie was banned from showing in Memphis, Tennessee, due to Lloyd Binfords Memphis Censor Board. The movie was also banned in Kansas.

Bill Gibron of PopMatters wrote "lacking anything remotely randy and giving equal time to both the actual nudists and the professional models hired to play topless, this is early raincoat-crowd fodder at its most tame and blameless." He also noted that "while the movie may seem docile by today's standard, it was positively shocking in 1960."

In his review for DVD Talk, Paul Mavis stated "what could have been in the hands of a half-way competent director either an entertaining B-flick with guns and naked broads, or a sly parody of the genre with plenty of opportunities for farce, is resolutely humdrum in the hands of shaky first-time director Wishman."

In a 1962 review in Vision, the author wrote, "the plot of the film is so ludicrous that had it been intended for a ten minute short it would have been one of the funniest, wildest ever; needless to say, the dramatic urgency comes to a grinding halt once we hit the nudist colony."

== Box office ==
Variety wrote: "Hideout in the Sun grossed nearly $12,000 in opening week at the Variety Theatre, Miami Beach, according to a spokesman for the theatre. This is the biggest single week's take in the 14-year history of the house, he said." During the opening week of the film at the theater, Dolores Carlos and two female co-stars were featured on the stage nightly, and also appeared in newspaper and radio advertising.

== See also ==
- List of American films of 1960
- Nudity in film
