= Nude on the Moon =

1961 film by Doris Wishman

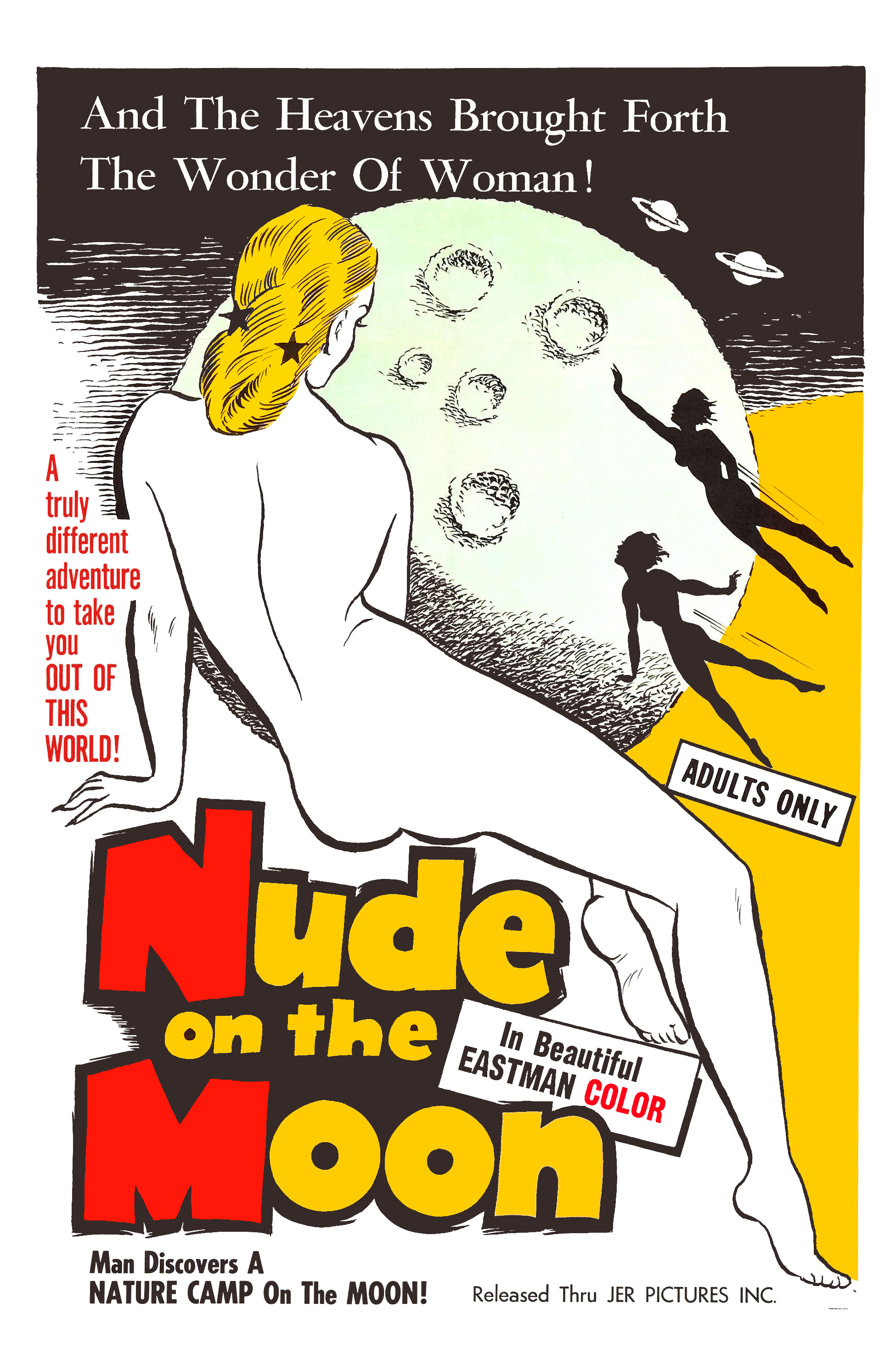
- Directed by: Raymond Phelan; Doris Wishman
- Written by: Raymond Phelan; Doris Wishman
- Produced by: Martin Caplan; Doris Wishman
- Starring: Marietta; William Mayer; Lester Brown; Pat Reilly; Ira Magee
- Cinematography: Raymond Phelan
- Music by: Daniel Hart
- Distributed by: J.E.R. Pictures Inc.
- Release date: 1961
- Running time: 83 minutes
- Country: United States
- Language: English

Nude on the Moon is a 1961 American science-fantasy nudist film co-written and co-directed by Doris Wishman and Raymond Phelan under the shared pseudonyms "O. O. Miller" and "Anthony Brooks".

Nude on the Moon is the second of eight nudist films produced and directed by Wishman. While most nudist films of the time were set within a conventional nudist camp, apparently as a way to "get past" censorship, Wishman decided to set the story in a nudist civilization on the Moon.

== Plot ==
Scientist Dr. Jeff Huntley inherits a fortune of US$3 million (equivalent to $32.32 million in 2025) from his uncle and invests it in the development of a rocket ship, built with the assistance of his mentor, Dr. Nichols.

After landing on the Moon, the pair discover a civilization of topless extraterrestrials led by a Moon Queen with telepathic powers.

Enamored of Dr. Huntley, the Moon Queen allows the men to take photos of the nudists during their everyday activities.

Their oxygen running low, the two are forced to return to Earth, realizing in the process that they have left their camera behind and have no proof of the aliens' existence.

Jeff is dispirited to learn that nobody believes their trip succeeded, but his spirits are lifted when he sees the resemblance between Dr. Nichols's secretary, Cathy, and the Moon Queen.

The movie ends as the two embrace, signaling the beginning of a new romance.

== Cast ==
- Marietta as Cathy / Moon Queen
- William Mayer as Professor Nichols
- Lester Brown as Dr. Jeff Huntley
- Pat Reilly as Moon Girl
- Ira Magee as Moon Girl
- Lacey Kelly as Moon Girl
- Shelby Livingston as Moon Girl
- Robert W. Kyorimee as Moon Man
- Joyce M. Geary as Moon Girl
- Charles Allen as Moon Girl
- Evelyn Burke as Moon Girl
- Joyce Brooks as Moon Girl
- Hugh Brooks as Moon Man
- Mary Lassey as Moon Girl
- Capt. R.C. Lassey as Air Force Captain
- Robert B. Lassey as Moon Child
- Doris Wishman as Lady in Parking Lot

== Soundtrack ==
Nude on the Moon features the original song "I'm Mooning Over You (My Little Moon Doll)" sung by Ralph Young (who also plays a principal role in Wishman's Blaze Starr Goes Nudist (1962) under the pseudonym "Russ Martine"). The lyrics and melody were written by Wishman's niece, Judith J. Kushner. According to Wishman, future Tonight Show bandleader Doc Severinsen arranged the orchestration but is not credited.

== Production ==
The Moon sequences in the film were shot at Coral Castle in Homestead, Florida, acknowledged in the film titles as "With deep appreciation, we wish to thank the management of Coral Castle, Homestead, Florida, for their cooperation in allowing us to use their facilities."

== Critical reception ==
In The New York Times, Dave Kehr called the film "ineffably odd and inadvertently hilarious."

In ReFocus: The Films of Doris Wishman, Karen Kohoutek wrote: "This light-hearted fantasy remains a uniquely imaginative project, diverging from the limits of a specific genre to provide a perhaps surprising depth of commentary about social attitudes and romantic negotiations at the time of its filming, in the historic moment when the United States stood on the verge of conquering space travel. ... Nude on the Moon displays a concern with the emotional life of its primary female character, and it depicts the man’s emotional maturity as both a literal voyage for him and a reward for the woman’s patience, themes that disrupt interpretations of Wishman targeting her work solely at male spectators."

In Space Oddities: Women and Outer Space in Popular Film and Culture, 1960–2000, Marie Lathers wrote: "The film is a good example of the strategic use and non-use of clothing in scenes of relations between human males and alien women; the encounter with the Other turns on the dress/not dressed opposition."

Film critic Glenn Erickson wrote on DVD Talk that the film is "a time capsule of naughty entertainment that will please some viewers and have others hoping their families don't catch them watching it," further describing the film as "a primitive nudist film [with] a rudimentary plot" and "the whole affair resembles a family home movie on LSD."

== Legacy ==
Nude on the Moon is considered a cult film.

References to the film in pop culture include:

- Nude on the Moon: The B-52's Anthology, a two-disc CD anthology of music by The B-52's, was released on Rhino Records. Lead singer Fred Schneider admired the director.
- "Nude on the Moon" (1996), a single by electronica duo Tipsy, also appears on the album Trip Tease. One of the remixes is called the "naked volleyball mix".

== See also ==
- List of American films of 1961
- List of films featuring extraterrestrials
- Nudity in film
