= Uta Erickson =

Norwegian actress

Artemida Irena Aldona Vasiliauskas known professionally as Uta Erickson was a Norwegian actress who appeared in many sexploitation films of the late 1960s.

== Career ==
Erickson starred in several provocatively titled films directed by Michael and Roberta Findlay, including The Kiss of Her Flesh, A Thousand Pleasures, The Curse of Her Flesh and The Ultimate Degenerate. Erickson was also a favorite of directors Doris Wishman (Love Toy) and Barry Mahon (Sex Killer).

== Partial filmography ==
- Unholy Matrimony (1966)
- Electronic Lover (1966)
- Olga's Dance Hall Girls (1966)
- The Sex Killer (1967)
- Love Toy (1968) (as Willa Mist)
- Seeds of Sin (1968)
- The Kiss of Her Flesh (1968)
- The Curse of Her Flesh (1968)
- See How They Come (1968)
- A Thousand Pleasures (1968)
- Beware the Black Widow (1968) (as Mary Macken)
- Passion in Hot Hollows (1969) (as Britt Hansen)
- She Came by Bus, also known as The Sick Ones (1969)
- Mnasidika (1969)
- She's Doing It Again (1969)
- The Ultimate Degenerate (1969)
- Bacchanale (1970)
- Women Women Women Moira (1970)
- Dynamite (1972)
