= Made in Australia (film) =

- Poster
- Directed by: Matthew Victor Pastor
- Produced by: Matthew Victor Pastor
- Music by: Fergus Cronkite (Andrew Tran)
- Release date: 8 September 2013 (Melbourne Underground)
- Running time: 82 minutes
- Country: Australia
- Language: English

Made In Australia is an Australian feature film released in 2013. Filmed in Melbourne, Australia and Hong Kong on a microbudget. It was awarded 'Best Guerrilla Film' at the 14th Melbourne Underground Film Festival One of the film's core themes is the perception of Asian masculinity in the West. The film is one of the only Australian features to show full-frontal Asian male nudity in film, with the title credits "Made In Australia" appearing over Matthew Victor Pastor's genitalia.

== Asian-Australian identity ==
Perhaps in a genre all its own. It is not a glowing feel good "ethnic" themed film as seen in Bend It Like Beckham overseas, or more locally, Strictly Ballroom in Australia. Nor is it a narrative of an intergenerational struggle avoiding poverty and escaping the ghosts and sorrow that can come with migration in the way the excellent The Home Song Stories and Mother Fish films followed. Pastor's film is more surreal, stronger in angst and lust, more brave in depicting the messiness of some human desires, and quite honest in how flawed we can be as humans, lovers, and individuals trying to make sense of our hearts, homes and homelands.

— Indigo Willing, Asian Australian Film Forum Network
