= Leo Wollman =

American physician

Dr. Leo Wollman (1914–1998), was a New York City medical doctor who assisted transgender individuals with their transitions. In 1979 he served on the founding committee of the Harry Benjamin International Gender Dysphoria Association, now the World Professional Association for Transgender Health, which wrote its first Standards of Care.

He had an uncredited appearance in the film Let Me Die a Woman directed by Doris Wishman. He was also a science and medicine advisor.
