= Bad Girls Go to Hell =

1965 American film by Doris Wishman

- Promotional release poster
- Directed by: Doris Wishman
- Written by: Doris Wishman (as Dawn Whitman)
- Produced by: Doris Wishman
- Starring: Gigi Darlene; George La Rocque; Sam Stewart
- Cinematography: C. Davis Smith
- Edited by: Ali Bendi
- Distributed by: Juri Productions Inc. Sam Lake Enterprises
- Release date: 1965
- Running time: 65 minutes
- Country: United States
- Language: English

Bad Girls Go to Hell is a 1965 American sexploitation film written, produced and directed by Doris Wishman. The film stars Gigi Darlene, Sam Stewart, Barnard L. Sackett, and Darlene Bennett.

The film contains soft-core sexual situations and is considered one of the director's first roughies, "a trash-cinema genre that flourished briefly in the years before court cases legalized hardcore porn, and Wishman was one of the important figures in the form."

== Plot ==
Meg is a Boston housewife, who is sexually assaulted by a janitor at her apartment building. She escapes when he hears someone coming, but he leaves a note under her door threatening to tell her husband if she doesn't come to his apartment. She goes and attempts to pay him off, but he attacks her. Killing him, she flees to New York City. Upon arriving in New York, she changes her name to Ellen Green and pretends to be from Chicago.
She meets a seemingly friendly man and accompanies him home. While there, he rebukes her for attempting to hold his hand and later flies into a rage upon discovering that she has set out alcohol for them to drink. Guzzling the whiskey, he attacks her, beating her with a belt. She escapes while he sleeps off his drunkenness. Meeting a strange woman, she accompanies her to her friend Della's place. That night, the two have sex. The next day, "Ellen" decides to leave. Della begs her to stay and says she loves her. "Ellen" says she loves Della as well and that is why she must leave. She then moves into a sleazebag hotel, where the landlord attacks her, so she moves once again, taking a job as a companion to an older lady. It turns out that old woman's son is a detective working on "Ellen's" case. The detective confronts her and she breaks down, only to wake up screaming. It was all a dream.
Consoled by Ted, she goes about her day only to find her dream repeating in real life as the janitor again attacks her.

== Cast ==
- Gigi Darlene as Meg Kelton / Ellen Green
- George La Rocque as the Husband who rapes Meg
- Sam Stewart as Ed Bains
- Gertrude Cross (as Sandee Norman) as Mrs. Thorne
- Alan Feinstein (as Alan Yorke) as Ted Kelton
- Barnard L. Sackett (as Bernard L. Sankett) as Tom
- Darlene Bennett as Tracy / Della
- Marlene Starr as the Wife who rents Meg the room
- Harold Key as the janitor

== Reception ==
In 1990, film critic Joe Bob Briggs listed the movie as one of the "Sleaziest Movies in the History of the World", and at the same time has called Wishman "the greatest female exploitation director in history." The movie is generally acknowledged to be the best of the 30 films she made.

Benjamin Crabtree of Collider said the film "transcends the trappings of B-level filmmaking to create a surprisingly surreal film; both ahead of its time and elusively critical of the period’s sociocultural mores, the film is a bittersweet and beguiling masterpiece that begs to be watched and rewatched."

Adam Nayman wrote in The Ringer that "with its off-center framings and drifting attention span, Wishman’s spare, minimalist style seems amateurish unless you get on its dreamy wavelength, at which point the mix of misanthropy, mystery, and circular, existential melancholy becomes positively Lynchian."

Film critic Bill Gibron wrote the movie "is a masterwork of miscreant behavior and a lost love letter to a social era when insecure men feared the sexual power of women and would do anything to keep it under their control." Adrian Smith wrote in Cinema Retro that "it is a surprisingly good picture for such a low budget grindhouse film; it is a real slice of the greasy underbelly of 1960s American life, and it is often hailed as one of the sleaziest films ever made."

== Home media ==
In 2008, Apprehensive Films released Bad Girls Go to Hell on DVD. The film was also included in the Blu-Ray collection; The Films of Doris Wishman: The Moonlight Years, that was released in 2022. It comes with an audio commentary track featuring film historian Frank Henenlotter and actor Anthony Sneed.

== See also ==
- List of American films of 1965
- List of LGBTQ-related films of 1965
- Nudity in film
