= Nudity clause =

Part of a contact that lists conditions for nude performances

A nudity clause/nudity waiver is a paragraph or a section in a performer's legal contract that stipulates which parts, if any, of a performer's body are to be exposed during a theatrical, television, cinematic, or other type of production. The clause may stipulate that a performer will not be required to perform in the nude, or it may specify that a performer is not allowed to perform in the nude. Nevertheless, a character they play may appear to be nude by the use of a "body double" in place of the performer during a nude scene or the use of a flesh-colored bodystocking or a pubic area-covering merkin. Sometimes a performer will refuse to accept a role which involves nudity.

Most performing contracts stipulate which body parts may be used in the final product. This may, for example, be the back above the waist, include the hands, neck, profile, etc. They may also specify which parts cannot be shown—such as buttocks, breasts, pubic hair, etc. There are strict union guidelines around on-set nudity, which requires actors to be told of any nude scenes well in advance and nudity waivers require directors to itemize exactly what will be shown and how.

At times, exposure of each body part is given a commercial value and open to negotiation. In 2001, Halle Berry appeared in the film Swordfish, which featured her first nude scene. At first, she refused to be filmed topless in a sunbathing scene, but she changed her mind when Warner Bros. raised her fee substantially. The brief flash of her breasts reportedly added $500,000 to her fee. Berry, however, denied this, explaining that after turning down numerous roles that required nudity, she decided to make Swordfish because her husband, Eric Benét, supported her and encouraged her to take risks.

== Purpose ==
Especially when they are launching their careers, many female performers refuse roles that require them to perform nude, either for personal or professional reasons; companies such as Disney often go to great lengths to protect their performers' 'family friendly' image. 'No-nudity' clauses are relatively rare, in that an actress that is approached to perform such a role is usually at a stage in their career where a polite refusal is acceptable, and in most cases, body doubles, bodystockings or other alternatives are available.

== Studio imposition ==
Sometimes it is the studios or production companies that insist that their actresses do not take part in nude scenes or other appearances. For example, to preserve her wholesome image, Annette Funicello, who was under contract with Walt Disney, was not allowed to be seen in a two-piece bathing suit or show her navel in the beach party films of the 1960s for American International Pictures, though the prohibition was not always followed.

== For cartoon characters ==
No-nudity clauses have also forbidden cartoon characters from appearing nude. Pamela Anderson, for example, who appeared nude many times in print and in films, informed Reuters that she insisted on a no-nudity clause for her cartoon alter ego in Stripperella, the adult animated series created by Stan Lee.

== See also ==
- Morals clause
- Intimacy coordinator
