= Love Toy =

- Directed by: Doris Wishman, credited as Louis Silverman
- Written by: J. J. Kindall
- Produced by: Doris Wishman, credited as Louis Silverman
- Starring: Bernard Marcel, Pat Happel, Uta Erickson (billed as Willa Mist) and Larry Hunter (billed as Vic Lester)
- Cinematography: Juan Fernandez
- Edited by: Lou Burdi
- Release date: 1968
- Running time: approx. 76 minutes
- Country: United States
- Language: English

Love Toy is a 1968 soft-core exploitation film, produced and directed by Doris Wishman. It stars Pat Happel, Uta Erickson (billed as Willa Mist) and Larry Hunter (billed as Vic Lester).

== Plot ==
Marcus loses all his belongings to Alex at a game of Gin Rummy. Alex offers to drop all debts in return for one night with Marcus' teenage daughter Chris. Marcus agrees reluctantly but when he tries to intervene, Alex and his wife Mary bind him to a chair. She stays behind to keep an eye on him.

Alex forces Chris to assume the roles of his childhood cat 'Samuel' (she has to lap up milk from a bowl while nude), his mother (she has to nurse him), his wife, his child (he spanks her), his horse, and finally his mistress.

Therewhile, Mary seems to be burning up in her green dress. She performs an erotic dance for Marcus (who seems to do nothing more than moan in agony or pain throughout most of the film), lapses into a memory of her mother having intercourse with a lover while she was a girl, and finally masturbates while watching Alex and Chris pretend they are lovers.

The film closes on a threesome between Alex, Chris and Mary, Marcus choking Chris to death on her own night gown and finally Chris's awakening from the bad dream she just had. As well as one final surprise...

== Cast ==
- Bernard Marcel (Alex)
- Pat Happel (Chris)
- Uta Erickson (Mary, billed as Willa Mist)
- Larry Hunter (Marcus, billed as Vic Lester)

== Reception ==
The film was described as "grimy parade of demented role-playing, wall-to-wall sex, and shocking violence." The film is said to signify "a turn toward a more sexually central theme" in Wishman's career.

== See also ==
- List of American films of 1968
