= Playgirls International =

- Film poster
- Directed by: Doris Wishman
- Written by: Cy Eichman
- Produced by: Doris Wishman
- Narrated by: Leslie Daniel
- Cinematography: Larry Wolk
- Edited by: Cy Eichman
- Music by: Titra Sound
- Release date: October 30, 1963 (US)
- Running time: 70 minutes
- Country: United States
- Language: English

Playgirls International (also known as Nature's Playgirls, International) is a 1963 American nudist film produced and directed by Doris Wishman. She is notable for having directed and produced at least 30 feature films during a career spanning over four decades, most notably in the sexploitation film genre.

== Synopsis ==
The film is a travelog exploring the "good life" in various parts of the world where hedonism is practiced. The first part shows cancan dancers performing in Paris, with similar scenes in Hawaii, Thailand, Japan, Germany, Austria, Mexico, Haiti, West Berlin and Hong Kong. In the United States, the Louis Prima Twist Show and Sam Butera and the Witnesses perform in Las Vegas. The film ends with footage of two Florida nudist camps, Sunny Palms Lodge in Homestead, and Spartans nudist camp in Miami, where members are shown dancing the Twist, the Hula, and an Apache war dance.

== Cast ==
- Leslie Daniel (narrator)
- Betty Andrews
- Eileen Traynor
- Kenneth Andrews
- Betsi Warton
- Lee Sinclair
- Christy Fanshee
- Maria Stinger
- Martha J. Pryor
- Harry W. Stinger
- Janice Coughlin
- Sylvia Bayner
- Louis Prima Twist Show
- Sam Butera and the Witnesses
- French Can-Can
- Roller Stars
- La Marionette de Valdes

== Reception ==
Boxoffice wrote that the "screenplay, deceptively simple in concept and containment, spins off briskly enough, telling of the good life, enjoyment of human pleasures against a colorful backdrop of world's pleasure points; the narration will satisfy the post 21 audiences certain to be attracted to local playdates; he doesn't get over-enthused, nor does he strive for subtleness that may well go hand-in-hand with a lecture platform." They also noted that in some cities, "the more discriminating may find themselves disappointed; this is, basically a super-sophisticated nudity study, far indeed from the provocative aura of international heiresses cavorting on dad's dough in plush pleasure places."

== See also ==
- List of American films of 1963
- Nudity in film
