= Let Me Die a Woman =

1978 film by Doris Wishman

- Directed by: Doris Wishman
- Produced by: Doris Wishman
- Cinematography: João Fernandes; Jack Malick
- Edited by: Louis Burdi
- Music by: Thomas Valentino
- Release date: 1978
- Running time: 79 minutes
- Country: United States
- Language: English

Let Me Die a Woman is a 1978 semidocumentary film concerning the lives of male-to-female transgender individuals, directed and produced by the exploitation film auteur Doris Wishman.

== Plot ==
The film contains interviews with the gender dysphoria pundit and caregiver Dr. Leo Wollman as well as transgender people, including the transgender rights activist Deborah Hartin. Between the interviews, there are staged dramatizations of the interviewees' experiences.

== Cast ==
- Leslie
- Deborah Harten
- Lisa Carmelle
- Frank Pizzo
- Harry Reems
- Carol Sands
- Billy Kelman
- Doug Martin
- Ursula Austin
- Arlana Blue
- Vanessa del Rio
- Michael Gaunt
- Richard Towers
- Leo Wollman

== Reception ==
DVD Talk said of the film, "jaw-droppingly divine, completely original and purposefully obtuse, Let Me Die a Woman has long been the Mount Everest of many a Wishman fan. Who knew finding it and finally climbing it would be so remarkably rewarding." Film critic Eivind Røssaak stated the film "must be one of the oddest, most honest documentaries ever made."

Michael Brooke from Sight and Sound wrote "it was an almost flawless exploitation package, fusing old dark-house atmospherics, rubbish transvestism, genuine sex-change operation footage, hilariously awful dialogue and acting, and a glorious disregard for anything even vaguely resembling good taste." Maitland McDonagh of Film Comment said the "footage of sexual reassignment surgery sent jaded Times Square habitués heading for the exit."

== See also ==
- List of American films of 1978
- List of LGBTQ-related films of 1978
- List of transgender characters in film and television
- List of feature films with transgender characters
