= Dildo Heaven =

2002 film by Doris Wishman

- Directed by: Doris Wishman
- Written by: Doris Wishman
- Produced by: Doris Wishman
- Release date: March 8, 2002 (New York Underground Film Festival)
- Running time: 79 minutes
- Country: United States
- Language: English

Dildo Heaven is a 2002 American softcore sexploitation comedy film by Doris Wishman. Wishman's 29th and penultimate film, it premiered in 2002, just months before her death. Shot on video in the early 1990s, It was restored and re-released in 2025.

== Plot ==
Three roommates each want to seduce their bosses. Lisa, a topless model, cannot get the attention of her boss, a photographer, and neither can Beth, an assistant to a novelist. Tess is already seeing her boss, who is cheating on is wife and promises to leave her for Tess. Billy, a voyeur, spies on them through their apartment door's keyhole.

Lisa watches television, which shows footage of earlier Wishman films. Beth walks by a sex shop, and later has a dream about dildos. She visits the sex shop and, after a worker there explains the difference between a dildo and a vibrator to her, she purchases a dildo, which she says is for a friend. Beth hides the dildo in her bedroom.

Billy, after being rejected by the women, seeks help from Dr. Faust, who sells him a treatment that promises to increase the size of the penis. It does not work. Billy also spies on other neighbors and through shrubs, where he also sees footage from previous Wishman films (including The Immoral Three and A Taste of Flesh).

When Lisa arrives for a shoot dressed in a raincoat, her boss takes a sudden interest in her and they begin a passionate affair. Beth catches Billy spying and punishes him by tying him to a bed and forcing him to wear a leather bondage hood, and he swears never to spy through keyholes again.

Tess's boss reneges on his promises to leave his wife. The photographer tells Lisa that their relationship is distracting him from his work, and he breaks up with her. Beth's boss introduces her to his old partner, Christy, whose return he has been anticipating, and Beth is shocked to learn that Christy is a man and that her boss is gay. Tess's boss tries to get back with Tess, but she rejects his advances.

Beth shows Lisa and Tess the dildo she has been hiding. Billy is tempted to spy through the keyhole, but does not. At their kitchen table, the three roommates commiserate over their shared fate, saying, "Viva la dildo!"

== Production ==
Wishman shot Dildo Heaven on Betamax video around 1993. In that period, she worked at a sex shop in the Coconut Grove neighborhood of Miami, Florida called the Pink Pussycat, which appears in the film.

Wishman incorporated footage she had shot for older films because she needed footage and "didn't have money." In 1998, LA Weekly reported that she was editing the film. She finished the film about three months before its premiere.

== Release ==
The film premiered in March 2002 at the 9th New York Underground Film Festival. Promoting the film in an appearance on Late Night with Conan O'Brien the day before the premiere, Wishman asked the other guest, critic Roger Ebert, why he had not included the film in his annual best of list, to which he replied that he had not seen it. It also screened at the Chicago Underground Film Festival in August of that year, only weeks after Wishman's death.

Muscle Distribution restored the film, re-releasing it in 2025.

== Critical reception ==
In a 2003 review for The Chicago Reader, Fred Camper wrote that, "In terms of conventional narrative, nothing works [...] But the miscues also fascinate, wildly off in a way that reveals the artifice of commercial product."

In 2022, Artforum described the film as "a charmed revisitation of her earlier output."
