= Benares (film) =

2005 Mauritius film

- Bénarès
- Directed by: Barlen Pyamootoo
- Written by: Barlen Pyamootoo
- Based on: Bénarès by Barlen Pyamootoo
- Music by: Ernest Wiehe
- Production company: Artcam International
- Release date: September 5, 2005 (Toronto International Film Festival)
- Running time: 75 minutes
- Countries: Mauritius; France
- Language: Mauritian Creole

Benares is a 2005 Mauritian movie directed and written by Barlen Pyamootoo and produced by French company Artcam International. It was released in May 2006. With the film, Pyamootoo became the first Mauritian filmmaker to use Mauritian Creole in a film. An adaptation of the book of the same name, the film is inspired by the Hollywood film Stranger Than Paradise (1984).

== Plot ==
Two young men who travelled around Mauritius of which they meet two interesting ladies who had them entertained.

== Cast ==
- Barlen Pyamootoo
- Danielle Dalbert
- Sandra Faro
- Davidsen Kamanah as Nad
- Kristeven Mootien as Mayi
- Vanessa Li Lun Yuk

== Release ==
The film was banned by the Mauritian Censor Board for viewers under the age of 18.
