= Deborah Hartin =

American lecturer and activist (1933–2005)

Deborah Marie Hartin (September 15, 1933 – March 15, 2005) was an American lecturer and activist. Her 1970 divorce following a gender transition made national headlines, and she went on to appear on numerous talk shows. Hartin was selected by the second The Book of Lists (1983) as one of ten prominent transexuals (the terms transgender and trans woman not being in wide use during the 1980s) and she was featured in the 1978 documentary Let Me Die a Woman.

== Life and career ==
Prior to transition, Hartin served in the United States Navy starting in 1953. While stationed in Pensacola, Florida, Hartin married, and the couple had a daughter in 1955. The marriage led to a separation in 1957, and after moving to Casablanca in 1966, Hartin transitioned in 1970. Her divorce that year made headlines as one of the first publicized divorces due to transition.

In 1971, Hartin brought suit against the Bureau of Records and Statistics within the New York City Department of Health and Mental Hygiene for refusing to update her sex designation on her birth certificate. Under pressure to accommodate trans citizens, the Bureau had voted unanimously to omit a sex designation from the amended birth certificates of transsexual people. Hartin's suit Deborah Hartin v. Director of the Bureau of Records and Statistics was dismissed in 1973.

Hartin told reporters she planned to convert to Judaism in 1976. Soon after, she stopped making media appearances.
