= Blaze Starr Goes Nudist =

1962 American film by Doris Wishman

- Directed by: Doris Wishman
- Written by: Melvin Stanley
- Produced by: Doris Wishman
- Starring: Blaze Starr; Russ Martine; Gene Berk
- Cinematography: Raymond Pheelan
- Edited by: Martin Samuels
- Music by: Songs by J. J. Kendall
- Production company: Juri Productions
- Distributed by: Doe-Rae Pictures Inc.
- Release date: 1962
- Running time: 75 minutes
- Country: United States
- Language: English

Blaze Starr Goes Nudist (also known as Busting Out and Blaze Starr Goes Back to Nature) is a 1962 American nudist film, directed and produced by Doris Wishman. The film stars burlesque queen Blaze Starr and crooner Ralph Young (as "Russ Martine"). It was written by Melvin Stanley.

== Plot ==
Screen siren Blaze Starr is tired of the rigors of celebrity life. After wandering into a screening of a nudist exploitation film, she travels to Sunny Palms Lodge, a nearby nudist camp, to apply for membership. Blaze enjoys the relaxed atmosphere the camp offers and becomes friends with the camp's director, Andy Simms. Her lack of interest in her professional life quickly becomes apparent to her manager/boyfriend Tony, however, who worries that Blaze will lose her acting contract if the studio finds out she's a nudist. As fate would have it, it turns out the studio head endorses the nudist lifestyle, and Blaze and Andy start a new romance.

== Cast ==
- Blaze Starr as herself
- Ralph Young as Andy Simms (as "Russ Martine")
- Gene Berk as Tony
- William Meyer
- Sandra Sinclair
- Stephen Bloom
- Louise Down (as Bunny Downe)
- James Antonio

== Production ==
The nude scenes were filmed at Sunny Palms Lodge in Homestead, Florida.

== Music ==
The film features the songs "Going Back To Nature" and "The Moon is The Lamp of Love" by J. J. Kendall.

== Release ==
The film premiered in Los Angeles on 1 July 1962.

== Modern appraisal ==
Georgina Guthrie wrote for the British Film Institute: "Frothy escapism is the name of the game in Wishman's fourth feature, an oddly innocent sun-drenched fantasy ... Highlights include its soft lounge jazz soundtrack, a pop-art colour palette and outrageous outfits aplenty."
