= Barlen Pyamootoo =

Mauritian filmmaker

- Born: 27 September 1960 (age 66); Trou d'Eau Douce, Mauritius
- Occupation: Director,
- Years active: 1995–present

Barlen Pyamootoo (born 27 September 1960), is a Mauritian filmmaker and writer. He is notable as the director of critically acclaim film Bénarès.

== Personal life ==
He was born on 27 September 1960 in Trou d'Eau Douce, Mauritius as the third child of a Tamil family with eight siblings. When he was 12-year-old, his mother left home to work in Germany. In 2006, his mother was killed by a bus.

== Career ==
In 1977, Pyamootoo went Strasbourg University with his father and studied French and Linguistics. Then he obtained a Diplôme d'études approfondies (DEA) in linguistics and a DEA in Educational Sciences. He later became the professor of letters in France from 1987 to 1993. In 1995, he returned to Mauritius to devote himself to writing and publishing. He is the founder and director of two publishing houses Alma founded in 2005 and L’Atelier d’écriture founded in 2009.

After return, he wrote his first book Bénarès. At that time he was 39 years of age. Then in 2002, he wrote his second book Le Tour de Babylone. In 2008 he wrote Salogi's a tribute to his mother. He started writing the next book L’île de poissons toxiques in 2002 and then stopped in 2005. He started the work again in 2013 and later published in 2017.

In 2005 he made his maiden film Bénarès as an adaptation of his book with the same name. The film deals with two young men who travelled around Mauritius of which they meet two interesting ladies who had them entertained. With the film, Pyamootoo became the first Mauritian filmmaker to use Mauritian Creole in a film.

=== Author work ===
- Bénarès, 1999
- Le Tour de Babylone, 2002
- Salogi's, 2008
- L’île de poissons toxiques, 2017
- Whitman, 2019

== Filmography ==
Year	Film	Role	Notes
2005	Bénarès	Director, writer	Based on his novel of the same name
