= Diary of a Nudist =

1961 American film directed by Doris Wishman

- Theatrical release poster
- Directed by: Doris Wishman
- Written by: Doris Wishman
- Produced by: Doris Wishman
- Starring: Davee Decker, Norman Casserly
- Cinematography: Raymond Pheelan
- Edited by: Martin Samuels
- Music by: Harry Glass; Song "Sun Lovers Blues" Words and Music by Judith J. Kushner, sung by Rosemary June
- Distributed by: Atlantic Pictures Corp.
- Release date: 27 December 1961 (US)
- Running time: approx. 72 minutes
- Country: United States
- Language: English

Diary of a Nudist, also known as Diary of a Girl Reporter, Diary of a Naturist, Girl Reporter Diary, Nature Camp Confidential, Nature Camp Diary or Nudist Confidential, is an American 1961 nudist film produced and directed by Doris Wishman.

== Plot ==
Arthur Sherwood, editor-in-chief of The Evening Times, stumbles upon a nudist camp and smells a good story. He assigns girl reporter Stacy Taylor to join the camp so she can write an exposé on the nudists' indecent lifestyle. Stacy becomes convinced of the sincerity of the nudist philosophy, however, and refuses to write a negative report. Sherwood joins the camp to complete the project, only to decide for himself that nudism is happy and wholesome.

== Cast ==
- Davee Decker as Stacy Taylor
- Norman Casserly as Arthur Sherwood
- Dolores Carlos as Marie
- Allan Blacker as Frank
- Joan Bamford as Helen
- Maria Stinger as Eleanor
- Harry W. Stinger as John
- Brigitte Bernard
- Allison Louise Downe
- Ronald M. Ziegler
- June Marko as Annette
- Gustave A. Hoek
- Nellie Hoek
- Phyllis Hoek as Phyllis
- Sandra Hoek
- Charles Allen as Tom
- Warrene Gray as Fran
- Una Diehl as Susan
- Gloria Flowers
- Zelda R. Suplee as nudist camp director
- Doris Wishman as Marie/lady waving from porch (uncredited)

== See also ==
- List of American films of 1961
- Nudity in film
