= Albert Arthur Allen =

American figure photographer and film director (1886–1962)

- Born: May 8, 1886; Grafton, Massachusetts, U.S.
- Died: January 25, 1962 (aged 75); Hayward, California, U.S.
- Known for: Nude photography

Albert Arthur Allen (May 8, 1886 – January 25, 1962) was an American figure photographer and film director known for nude portraiture.

== Biography ==
Allen was born to a wealthy New England family in 1886, and was educated in Boston. At the age of twenty-one, he moved to California and spent years traveling and studying art. In 1916, he opened the Allen Art Studios in Oakland, California, where he devoted his efforts to refining photographic techniques. The studio later became known as the Allen Institute of Fine and Applied Art, before it was destroyed by a fire in 1925. The following year, Allen rebuilt the studio and called it the Classic Motion Picture Corporation, a venture that lasted two years before declaring bankruptcy.

A motorcycle accident in 1923 left Allen permanently disabled, but he continued to work. His nude photographs were considered scandalous by American standards during the Roaring Twenties. He was indicted for sending obscene materials through interstate mail, and spent years in litigation.

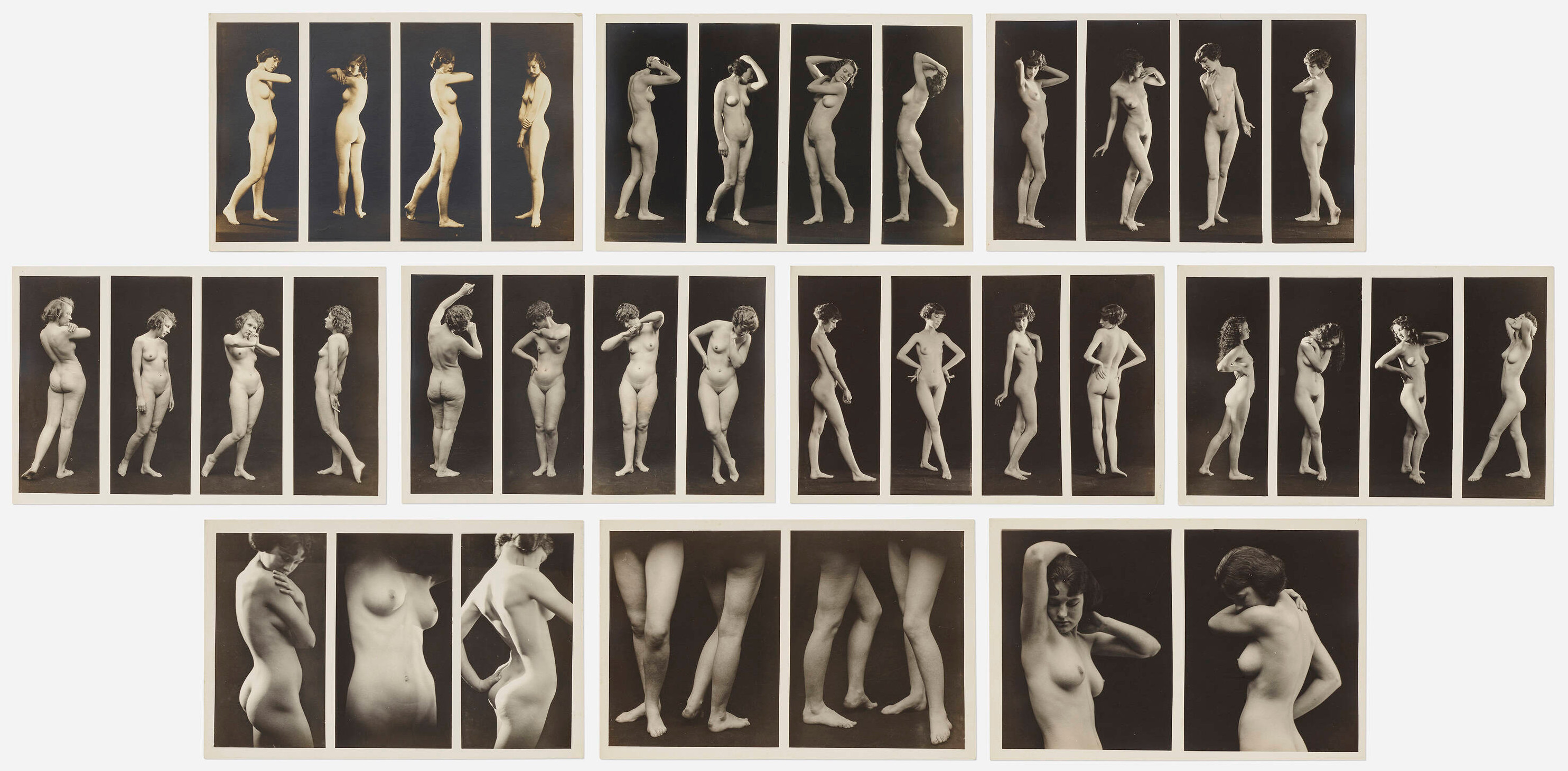
The Female Figure, Series I

Little is known about Allen's later life. His first commercial exhibition did not take place until 1979, seventeen years after his death.

Allen died in Hayward, California, at the age of 75. He was survived by his son, Frederick.

== Filmography ==
- Forbidden Daughters (1927)

== Bibliography ==
- Allen, Albert Arthur (1919). Alo Studies. Allen Art Studios. ASIN B00088DF7E.
- Allen, Albert Arthur; Kaplan, Daile (2001). Premiere Nudes. Twin Palms Publishers. ISBN 978-0944092880.
