= Behind the Nudist Curtain =

1964 American film by Doris Wishman

- Theatrical release poster
- Directed by: Doris Wishman
- Written by: Martin Samuels; Doris Wishman
- Produced by: Doris Wishman
- Starring: Sandra Sinclair
- Narrated by: Bret Morrison
- Cinematography: Raymond Phelan
- Edited by: Al Nahmias
- Music by: Picture Scores
- Color process: Eastmancolor
- Production company: Juri Productions
- Distributed by: Atlantic Pictures
- Release date: 11 September 1964
- Running time: 71 minutes
- Country: United States
- Language: English

Behind the Nudist Curtain (also known as Nature. Girls. Unlimited) is an American 1964 nudist film produced and directed by Doris Wishman and starring Sandra Sinclair. The New York Times lists it as one of the "berserk sexploitation pictures" made by Wishman.

The film is now considered lost.

The film was "built out of scenes from a European travelogue, into which Wishman spliced the requisite nudist footage". It was Wishman’s last nudist film.

== Cast ==
- Lee Abell as Self(as Lee Abel)
- Betty Andrews as Self
- Janice Coughlin as Self
- Christy Foushee as Self(as Christy Fanshee)
- William Mayer as Self
- Martha J. Pryor as Self
- Sandra Sinclair as Self(as Sandy Sinclair)
- Harry W. Stinger as Self
- Maria Stinger as Self
- Betsi Warton as Self

== See also ==
- List of American films of 1964
