= Satan Was a Lady (1975 film) =

1975 American film by Doris Wishman

- Directed by: Doris Wishman (billed as Kenyon Wintel)
- Written by: Bruce Leatoni
- Produced by: Doris Wishman (billed as Kenyon Wintel)
- Starring: Bree Anthony, Tony Richards, Annie Sprinkle, Bobby Astyr
- Cinematography: Charles Lamont
- Edited by: Luigi Galloniti
- Release date: 1975
- Running time: approx. 70 minutes
- Country: United States
- Language: English

Satan Was a Lady is an American 1975 hardcore pornographic film, produced and directed by Doris Wishman, and starring Bree Anthony, Tony Richards, Annie Sprinkle and Bobby Astyr.

The film was rated X in the United States, the first of Wishman's films to be considered "full-fledged pornography". Wishman, however, refused to direct the pornographic scenes herself. She worked on the film under pseudonym. Wishman was also said to have "later disowned" the film. The film remains Wishman's only hardcore pornographic film with Come With Me My Love (1976).

Wishman's 2001 film of the same title is not a remake.

== Synopsis ==
Claudia and Victor are engaged to be married. Claudia's sister, Terry, has affairs with both Victor and Bobby while Victor maintains another relationship on the side (C. J. Laing). Victor dies.

Meanwhile, Ada– Terry's mother and Claudia's stepmother – schemes to cheat Claudia out of her inheritance. In the end, the entire plot is revealed through Victor, who comes back as a ghost.

== Cast ==
- Bree Anthony (Claudia)
- Tony Richards (Victor, billed as Tony Rich)
- Annie Sprinkle (Terry, billed as Anny Sands)
- Bobby Astyr (Bobby, billed as Bobby Astyn)
- C.J. Laing (Victor's mistress, billed as Chris Jackson)
- Sandy Foxx (Ada - Terry's mother, billed as Sandi Foxx)
- Neil Rhodes (Detective)

== See also ==
- List of American films of 1975
