= Doris Wishman =

American filmmaker (1912–2002)

- Wishman on a film set, c. 1960s
- Born: June 1, 1912; New York City, U.S.
- Died: August 10, 2002 (aged 90); Miami, Florida, U.S.
- Education: Hunter College
- Occupations: Director, producer, writer
- Years active: 1959–2002
- Spouse: Jack Abrams (died 1958)

Doris Wishman (June 1, 1912 – August 10, 2002) was an American filmmaker. She is credited with having directed and produced at least 30 feature films during a career spanning over four decades, most notably in the sexploitation film genre.

A native of New York City, Wishman began her film career as a hobby after the death of her husband in 1958. She made her feature debut with Hideout in the Sun (1960), and went on to direct numerous nudist and sexploitation films, such as Gentlemen Prefer Nature Girls (1963), Behind the Nudist Curtain (1963), and Bad Girls Go to Hell (1965). In the 1970s, she made her first foray into directing pornographic films.

In 1979, Wishman filmed her first and only feature horror film, A Night to Dismember, which she spent several years editing after multiple reels were destroyed during post-production. She made a further three films in the early 2000s before dying in 2002, aged 90.

== Life and career ==
=== Early life ===
Doris Wishman was born on June 1, 1912, in New York City, the daughter of Ukrainian-Jewish immigrants. Her father was a hay and grain salesman; her mother died when she was still a child. She was raised in the New York City borough of the Bronx, where she graduated from James Monroe High School. After graduating from high school, Wishman claimed to have taken acting lessons at the Alviene School of Dramatics in New York City in the early 1930s, where she was a classmate of Shelley Winters. She later studied at Hunter College.

She later worked as a film booker for her cousin Max Rosenberg, an independent film distributor who handled both art films and exploitation film fare during the late 1940s and early 1950s. Wishman also worked as an actress in New York City throughout the 1950s, and for some time worked with Joseph Levine. During this same period, she was married briefly to advertising consultant Jack Abrams and resided with him in Florida until his death in 1958 due to a heart attack at age 31, being widowed only five months after their marriage. By her own account, Wishman began her film production career after Abrams' untimely death, as she felt she "needed something to fill my hours with."

=== Beginnings; nudist films ===
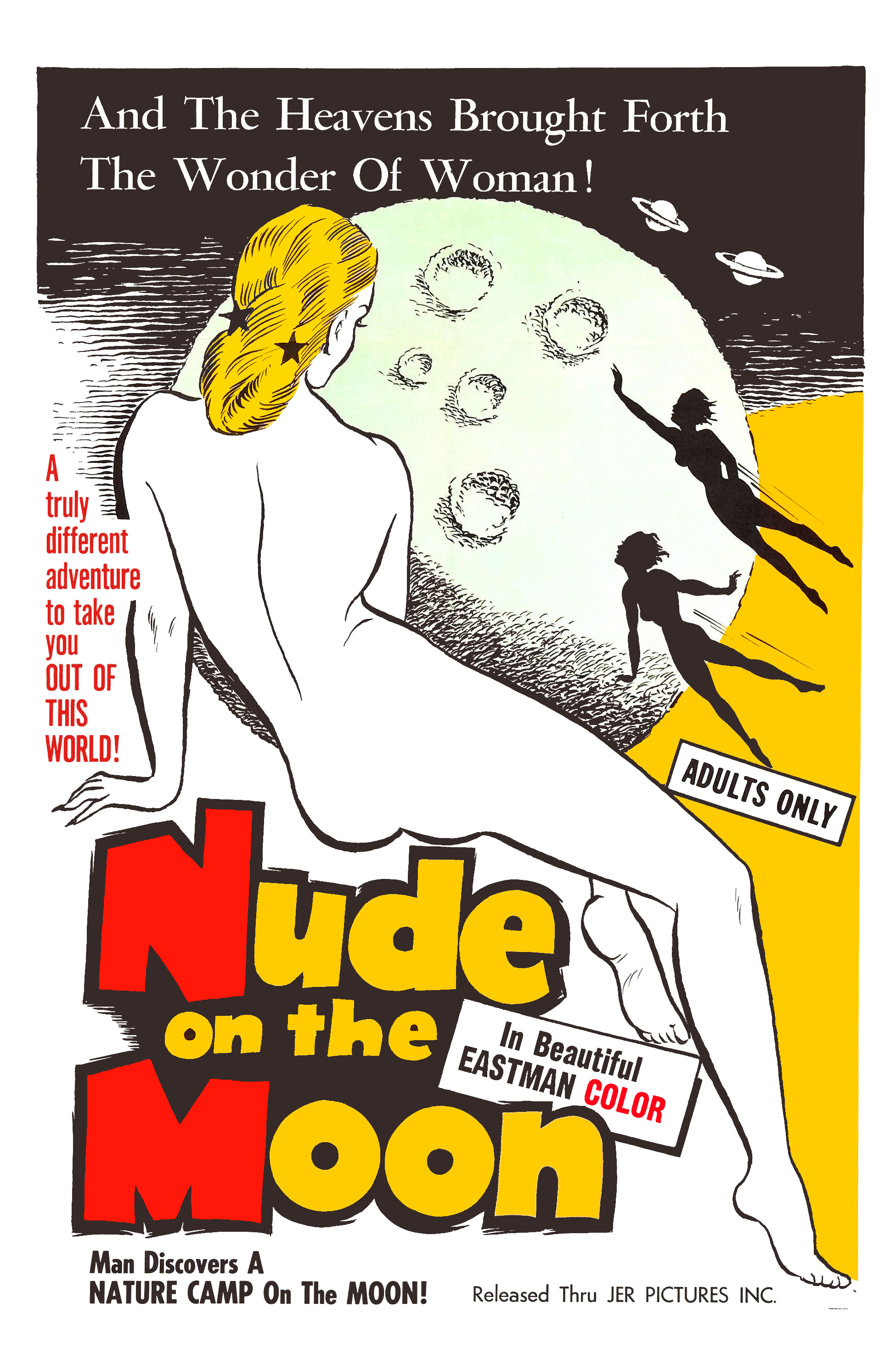
Nude on the Moon poster

Her first films are called nudist camp films or nudist romances. In 1957, a New York Appeals court ruling allowed films depicting nudism to be exhibited in movie theaters in New York State. Wishman was familiar with the appeal and potential of nudist camp movies due to her acquaintances with Walter Bibo, whose film Garden of Eden gained notoriety due its influence of swaying censorship laws for filming nudity. Inspired by this development, Wishman claimed in several interviews to have borrowed $10,000 from her sister to produce her first film, Hideout in the Sun, a nudist film, shot in late 1958 and released in early 1960. Her next film, Nude on the Moon, released in 1961, was a science-fiction nudie. The film was banned in New York after the New York State Censorship Board ruled that films featuring nudity in a nudist colony were legally permissible, but nudity in a fantasy film set in a "nudist colony on the Moon" was not. Her fourth nudist film, Blaze Starr Goes Nudist (1962), starred legendary burlesque performer Blaze Starr. Wishman produced eight nudist films in total between 1958 and 1964. After the popularity of the genre began to wane, she decided to abandon nudist exploitation films and transition into the new sexploitation genre. Doris Wishman had produced, directed, and written more films in the nudist-film genre than anyone else at the time, when she decided to switch direction.

=== Sexploitation films ===
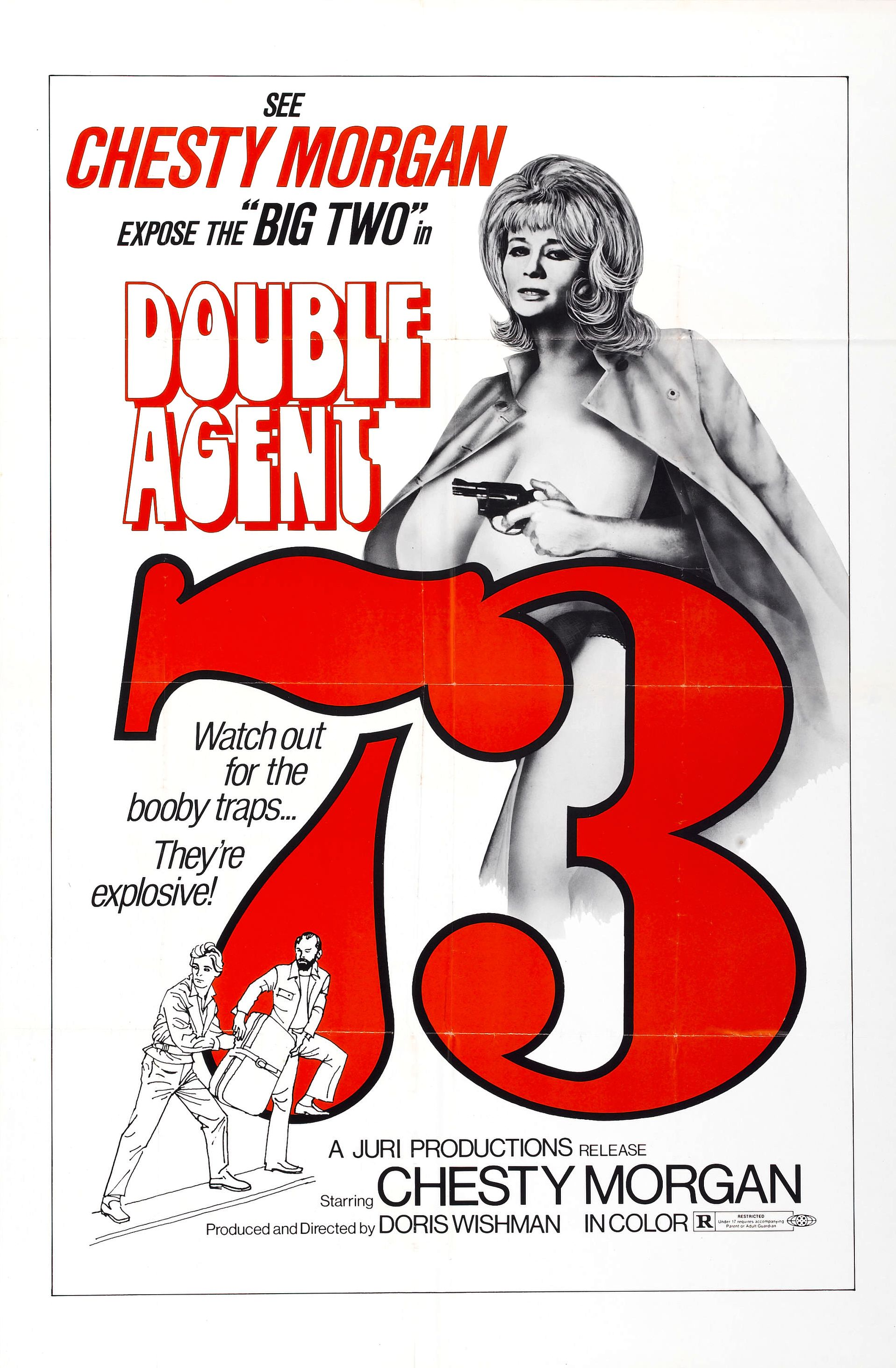
Poster for Double Agent 73

Wishman began to produce and direct sex-exploitation or sexploitation features in 1964, which were often called "roughies". Censorship at the time would allow very little, meaning Wishman and other sexploitation directors used different tactics to portray eroticism and excitement, using melodrama, cutaway, soft-core sex talk, and suggestive nudity that just skirted under the law. This put Wishman at odds with censorship law. In this genre, Wishman also used a different style of filmmaking in which she would cut to objects or scenery not in the scene, similar to Soviet montage. Moya Luckett considers that the cutaway style Wishman used was possibly to disrupt male gaze and incorporate a feminine gaze.

Her second release in this genre was Bad Girls Go to Hell (1965), Wishman's first collaboration with her long-time cinematographer C. Davis Smith. During this period, she frequently worked under the pseudonym "Louis Silverman", the name of her second husband. She also directed The Sex Perils of Paulette (1965), which featured Tony Lo Bianco in his film debut. The Sex Perils of Paulette was heavily censored by the New York Censor Board.

All of Wishman's sexploitation work was shot in black and white until the release of her first soft-core color feature, Love Toy (circa 1970). Shortly thereafter, she produced a sex comedy entitled Keyholes Are for Peeping (1972) (also known as Is There Love After Marriage?) starring comedian Sammy Petrillo. In the mid-1970s, she went on to direct two low-budget thrillers featuring burlesque performer Chesty Morgan: Deadly Weapons and Double Agent 73, the former of which was distributed internationally by Hallmark Releasing Corporation, and made on a budget of $50,000. When producing roughies, Wishman shot them with a handheld camera, a tactic used by experimental filmmakers, and exploitation filmmakers trying to cut down shooting costs. Antiobscenity law at the time greatly limited the circulation of the films of Doris Wishman and other sexploitation directors.

=== Pornographic and later exploitation work ===
Her work in the 1970s-'80s was all in the soft-core genre of exploitation, except that in the mid-1970s, Wishman directed two hardcore pornographic features entitled Satan Was a Lady (1975) and Come With Me, My Love (1976), both of which featured Annie Sprinkle. With the collapse of censorship law, demand for nudity in film rose, impacting Wishman's film direction. Hardcore was now available and explicit sex could be filmed; this, however, Wishman and many sexploitation directors considered distasteful. Wishman was not fond of working on pornographic films and later in her life denied having directed them. In 1968, she released The Hot Month in August and Passion Fever, two already completed Greek films, which Wishman bought and added minimal original material, such as voiceover. Additionally in 1978, she released a semidocumentary feature entitled Let Me Die a Woman, which she had originally begun shooting in 1971. The film featured interviews with several transgender individuals, one of whom was Deborah Hartin, and included dramatic reconstructions of scenes from their lives. It was one of the first films to focus on transsexualism and to star transsexuals. The events in the movie were depictions of real events, according to Dr. Leo Wollman, who was featured in the film. One such dramatization featured porn star Harry Reems before he became internationally renowned for his role in Deep Throat (1972). In light of the expanding slasher film craze that began with Halloween in 1978, Wishman's final feature was a horror film entitled A Night to Dismember. Begun in the late 1970s, it went through various manifestations and was finally completed in 1983. The film stars pornographic actress Samantha Fox. It was never theatrically released. In these later works, the films take a bloody and grotesque turn, and are sometimes referred to as her cinema of somatic portrayal, due to heavy themes of the body betraying itself.

=== Later life and final films ===
After the failure of A Night to Dismember, Wishman moved to Coral Gables, Florida, in the mid-1980s, where she found work in an adult-novelty store. Interest in her work began to slowly increase due to the home video release of many of her films through Something Weird Video. A cult following started to form and Wishman was honored at the New York Underground Film Festival in 1998 and appeared twice on Late Night with Conan O'Brien, one of which she was interviewed with Roger Ebert. When she returned to filmmaking in 2001, she had three new projects. Wishman won Best Comeback Kid at New York Underground Film Festival for the drama film Satan Was a Lady starring Honey Lauren, unrelated to her 1975 pornographic film of the same name. The others included a sex comedy called Dildo Heaven, released in 2002, and Each Time I Kill, which had cameos from John Waters, Linnea Quigley, and Fred Schneider, the singer of the B-52s.

== Death ==
Wishman died on August 10, 2002, in Miami, Florida, shortly after being treated for lymphoma.

== Legacy ==
Wishman made more films than any other female director of the sound era. Filmmaker John Waters featured a clip from Deadly Weapons in his film Serial Mom. Film critic Joe Bob Briggs described Wishman as "The greatest female exploitation film director in history." She was one of the most active women directors in the world during the 1960s and '70s working in the sexploitation genre. Prior to her death, she received a lifetime achievement award from the Chicago Underground Film Festival, and several of her films were selected for a gala celebrating her work at Los Angeles's Nuart Theatre in 1998, titled "Doris Wishman: Queen of Sexploitation." She was one of the interview subjects in the B-movie roadshow documentary Schlock! The Secret History of American Movies. In 2021, she was the subject of a curated retrospective on the art-house streaming service, the Criterion Channel.

== Filmography ==
Year	Title	Notes	Ref.
1960	Hideout in the Sun		
1961	Nude on the Moon		
1961	Diary of a Nudist		
1962	Blaze Starr Goes Nudist		
1963	Gentlemen Prefer Nature Girls		
1963	Playgirls International		
1964	Behind the Nudist Curtain		
1964	The Prince and the Nature Girl		
1965	Bad Girls Go to Hell		
1965	The Sex Perils of Paulette		
1966	Another Day, Another Man		
1966	My Brother's Wife		
1967	A Taste of Flesh		
1967	Indecent Desires		
1968	Too Much Too Often!		
1968	Love Toy		
1970	The Amazing Transplant		
1972	Keyholes Are for Peeping	Also known as: Is There Love After Marriage?	
1973	Deadly Weapons		
1974	Double Agent 73		
1975	The Immoral Three		
1975	Satan Was a Lady		
1976	Come with Me, My Love	Also known as: The Haunted Pussy	
1978	Let Me Die a Woman		
1983	A Night to Dismember	Filmed in 1979	
2001	Satan Was a Lady	Differs from 1975 film, but uses same title	
2002	Dildo Heaven		
2007	Each Time I Kill	Released posthumously	

== See also ==
- Nudity in film

== Works cited ==
- Geltzer, Jeremy (2016). Dirty Words and Filthy Pictures: Film and the First Amendment. Austin, Texas: University of Texas Press. ISBN 978-1-477-30743-4.
- Jancovich, Mark; Reboli, Antonio Lázaro; Stringer, Julian; Willis, Andrew (2003). Defining Cult Movies: The Cultural Politics of Oppositional Tastes. Manchester: Manchester University Press. ISBN 978-0-719-06631-3.
- Kozma, Alicia; Freibert, Finley, eds. (2023). The Films of Doris Wishman. Edinburgh University Press. ISBN 978-1-4744-8236-3. JSTOR 10.3366/j.ctv1vtz83z. "ReFocus: The American Directors Series"
- McKendry, Rebecca (2010). "Fondling Your Eyeballs: Watching Doris Wishman". In Cline, John; Weiner, Robert G. (eds.). From the Arthouse to the Grindhouse: Highbrow and Lowbrow Transgression in Cinema's First Century. Lanham, Maryland: Scarecrow Press. pp. 57–74. ISBN 978-0-810-87655-2.
- Mendik, Xavier; Schneider, Steven Jay (2003). Underground U.S.A.: Filmmaking Beyond the Hollywood Canon. New York: Columbia University Press. ISBN 978-0-231-85002-5.
- Murray, Raymond (1998). Images in the Dark: An Encyclopedia of Gay and Lesbian Film and Video. London: Titan Books. ISBN 978-1-840-23033-8.
- Quarles, Mike (2001). Down and Dirty: Hollywood's Exploitation Filmmakers and Their Movies. Jefferson, North Carolina: McFarland. ISBN 978-0-786-46257-5.
- Shteir, Rachel (2004). Striptease: The Untold History of the Girlie Show. Oxford: Oxford University Press. ISBN 978-0-195-30076-5.
