= Forbidden Daughters =

1927 film

- Directed by: Albert Arthur Allen
- Starring: Clarice Conwell; Gladys DeLores; Kathryn Kay; Ralph O'Brien
- Distributed by: Something Weird Video (2002) (USA) (DVD)
- Release date: 1927
- Running time: 13 minutes
- Country: United States
- Language: Silent (English subtitles)

Forbidden Daughters is a 1927 American silent black & white short erotic-drama film directed by prominent nude photographer Albert Arthur Allen. This is the only known movie directed by Allen who, otherwise, was famous by his work as a photographer of nude female models.

== Plot ==
Alva receives news from her long-lost husband, Russell, and goes to Africa in search of him. There, she finds that her husband is being "held prisoner" by a naked native princess, called Loma. Now, in order to bring Russell back home, Alva must show that she's better than the princess.

== Cast ==
- Clarice Conwell as Alva
- Gladys DeLores as Harem Favorite
- Kathryn Kay as Harem Dancer
- Ralph O'Brien as Russell
