= James Sizemore =

New York based composer and orchestrator

- Born: 4 December 1978 (age 46)
- Genres: Film scores, classical, rock, jazz
- Occupation(s): Composer, music producer
- Years active: 2003–present
- Website: www.jamessizemore.com

James Sizemore is a New York-based composer, music editor, and orchestrator, best known for his work orchestrating films such as The Hobbit: The Desolation of Smaug and The Hobbit: The Battle of the Five Armies, and producing and arranging the scores for Rosewater and Spotlight. He contributed electronics programming to the scores of The Twilight Saga: Eclipse, Cosmopolis, and Maps to the Stars.

He has also worked as an educator, teaching courses on the subject of film scoring at New York University’s Steinhardt School of Music and the Tisch School of the Arts, The Manhattan School of Music, and has served as a guest speaker for Mark of the Unicorn at industry events such as the NAMM Show.

James lives in the Hudson Valley, NY with his wife, chef and cookbook author Nicki Sizemore and his two daughters.
