= The Amazing Transplant =

1970 American film by Doris Wishman

- Theatrical release poster
- Directed by: Doris Wishman (credited as Louis Silverman)
- Written by: Doris Wishman (credited as Dawn Whitman
- Produced by: Doris Wishman (credited as Louis Silverman)
- Starring: Juan Fernandez; Linda Southern; Larry Hunter
- Cinematography: C. Davis Smith
- Edited by: Lou Burdi
- Release date: 1970
- Running time: approx. 71 minutes
- Country: United States
- Language: English

The Amazing Transplant is an American 1970 sexploitation film, written, produced and directed by Doris Wishman. The film stars Juan Fernandez, Linda Southern, and Larry Hunter.

== Plot ==
Arthur visits Mary to profess his love and propose to her. But when he notices her earrings, he begins to rape her and winds up choking her to death. His mother is worried and asks her police detective brother-in-law Bill to help find him. Meanwhile, Mary has been found dead, the police suspect Arthur and the radio informs the public about the apparent murder.

In the course of his investigation, Bill finds several women who tell of Arthur's surprising rapes (since he seems an otherwise pleasant guy) while they are graphically shown in flashbacks. Each one has a different character: One is a violent rape scene, one victim (a highschool acquaintance) turns the rape into lovemaking, another (lesbian) victim is so repelled that she vomits afterwards.

Only the viewer gets to see the connection however, the glistening earrings each victim wears, and which set Arthur off. The story finally is explained to Bill by Dr. Meade who a couple of months ago performed a penis transplant on Arthur which may have also transplanted the former womanizing owner's fondness of golden earrings.

== Cast ==
- Juan Fernandez as Arthur Barlen
- Linda Southern as Ann Barlen, Arthur's mother
- Larry Hunter as Det. Bill Barlen, Arthur's uncle
- Olive Denneccio as Edie Stone
- Sandy Eden as Mary Thorne
- Kim Pope as Ms. Evans
- Bernard Marcel as Dr. Cyril Meade (billed as E.B. Priest)
- Suzzan Landau as Bobbie's lover
- Janet Banzet as Bobbie Revan (billed as Pat Barrett)

== Home media ==
A DVD version was released on June 1, 2001.

== See also ==
- List of American films of 1970
