= After the Ball (1897 film) =

1897 film by Georges Méliès

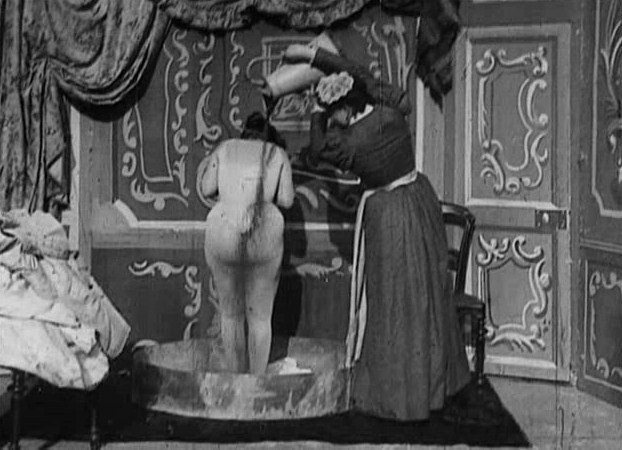
- Scene from the film
- Directed by: Georges Méliès
- Produced by: Star Film Company
- Starring: Jehanne d'Alcy; Jane Brady
- Release date: 1897
- Running time: Short
- Country: France
- Language: Silent film

After the Ball (French: Après le bal) is an 1897 French short silent film made by Georges Méliès. It was sold by Méliès's Star Film Company and numbered 128 in its catalogues.

A surviving print of the film

== Plot ==
A maidservant helps her lady get undressed (with nudity simulated by a bodystocking). The maid helps the woman bathe, pouring water over her, and finally covers and dries her with a robe.

== Production ==
Méliès was not the first filmmaker to include simulated nudity in a film; Eugène Pirou had already made a film along the same lines in late 1896, Le Bain de la Parisienne. (Méliès's film is sometimes also known by this title.) Henri Joly, who made films for Charles Pathé, is believed to have filmed similarly racy subjects as early as 1895. In Méliès's version, Jehanne d'Alcy is the bather, with Jane Brady, a music hall actress, as the chambermaid.

Méliès, d'Alcy, and Brady made After the Ball outdoors, with the backdrop spread on a peach-garden wall (a mur à pêches) on the Méliès family property. Méliès's first glass studio had already been built, but was not quite ready to use as the walls were still being reinforced. According to d'Alcy's recollections, as reported to her granddaughter Madeleine Malthête-Méliès, dark sand stood in for the "water" because d'Alcy was cold in her body stocking.
