= History of erotic depictions =

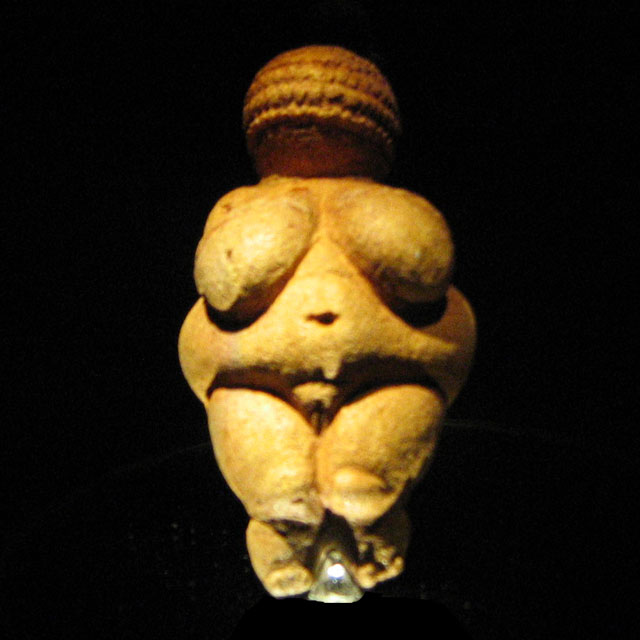
The Venus of Willendorf, a figurine with exaggerated sexual characteristics. Estimated to have been made c. 30,000 years ago

The history of erotic depictions includes paintings, sculpture, photographs, dramatic arts, music and writings that show scenes of a sexual nature throughout time. They have been created by nearly every civilization, ancient and modern. Early cultures often associated the sexual act with supernatural forces and thus their religion is intertwined with such depictions. In Asian countries such as India, Nepal, Sri Lanka, Japan, Korea, and China, representations of sex and erotic art have specific spiritual meanings within native religions. The ancient Greeks and Romans produced much art and decoration of an erotic nature, much of it integrated with their religious beliefs and cultural practices.

In more recent times, as communication technologies evolved, each new technique, such as printing, photography, motion pictures and computers, has been adapted to display and disseminate these depictions.

== Attitudes through history ==
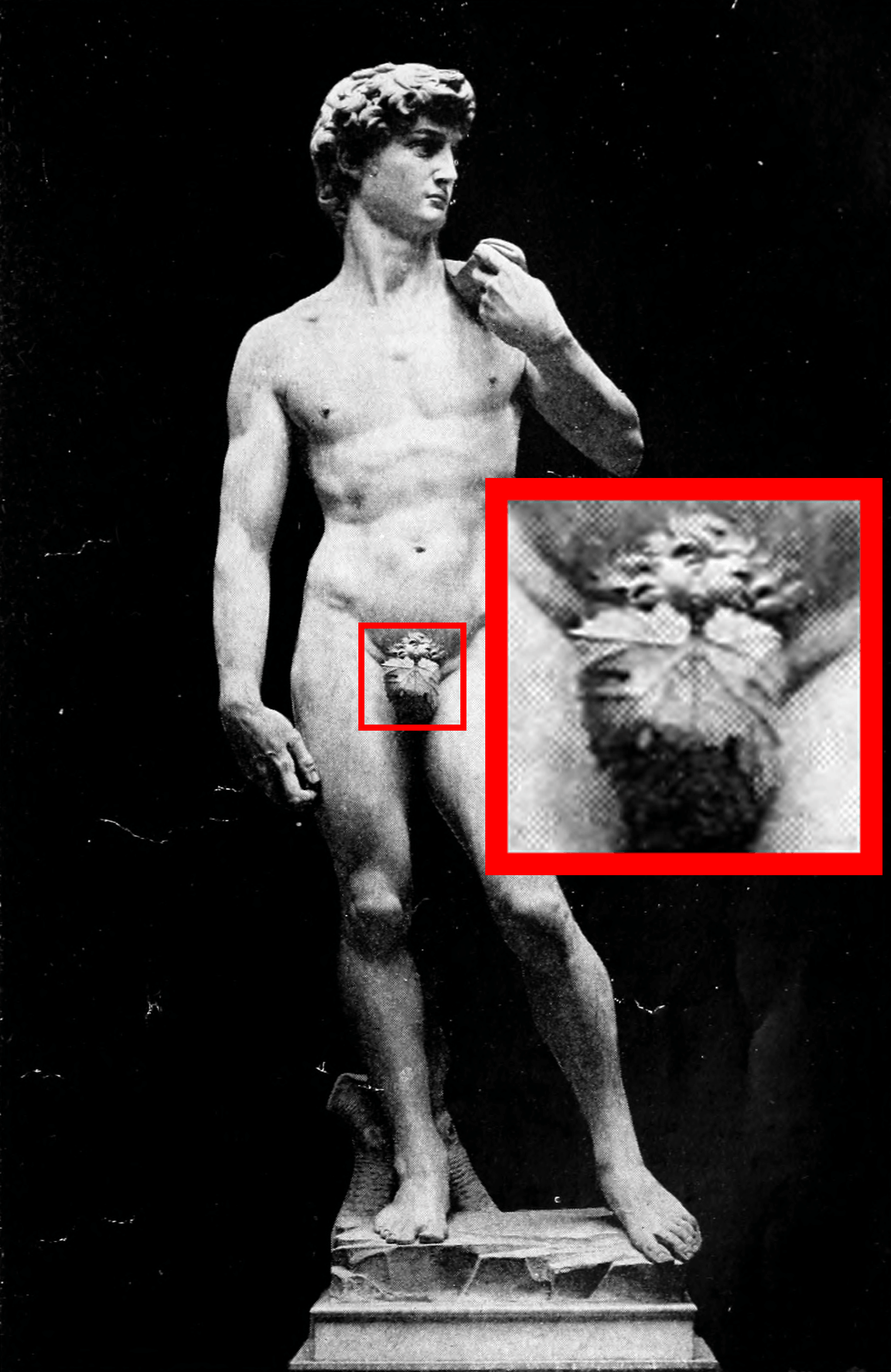
The plaster cast of David at the Victoria and Albert Museum has a detachable plaster fig leaf which is displayed nearby. Legend claims that the fig leaf was created in response to Queen Victoria's shock upon first viewing the statue's nudity and was hung on the figure prior to royal visits, using two strategically placed hooks.

In early times, erotic depictions were often a subset of the indigenous or religious art of cultures and as such were not set aside or treated differently than any other type. The modern concept of pornography did not exist until the Victorian era. Its current definition was added in the 1860s, replacing the older one meaning writings about prostitutes. It first appeared in an English medical dictionary in 1857 defined as "a description of prostitutes or of prostitution, as a matter of public hygiene." By 1864, the first version of the modern definition had appeared in Webster's Dictionary: "licentious painting employed to decorate the walls of rooms sacred to bacchanalian orgies, examples of which exist in Pompeii." This was the beginning of what today refers to explicit pictures in general. Though some specific sex acts were regulated or prohibited by earlier laws, merely looking at objects or images depicting them was not outlawed in any country until 1857. In some cases, the possession of certain books, engravings or image collections was outlawed, but the trend to compose laws that actually restricted viewing sexually explicit things in general was a Victorian construct.

When large-scale excavations of Pompeii were undertaken in the 1860s, much of the erotic art of the Romans came to light, shocking the Victorians who saw themselves as the intellectual heirs of the Roman Empire. They did not know what to do with the frank depictions of sexuality, and endeavored to hide them away from everyone but upper-class scholars. The movable objects were locked away in the Secret Museum in Naples, and what could not be removed was covered and cordoned off so as to not corrupt the sensibilities of women, children and the working class. England's (and the world's) first laws criminalising pornography were enacted with the passage of the Obscene Publications Act 1857. Despite their occasional repression, depictions of erotic themes have been common for millennia.

Pornography has existed throughout recorded history and has adapted to each new medium, including photography, cinema, video, and computers and the internet.

The first instances of modern pornography date back to the sixteenth century when sexually explicit images differentiated itself from traditional sexual representations in European art by combining the traditionally explicit representation of sex and the moral norms of those times.

The first amendment prohibits the U.S. government from restricting speech based on its content. Indecent speech is protected and may be regulated, but not banned. Obscenity is the judicially recognized exception to the first amendment. Historically, this exception was used in an attempt to ban information about sex education, studies on nudism, and sexually explicit literature.

In the case of People v. Freeman, the California Supreme Court ruled to distinguish prostitution as an individual taking part in sexual activities in exchange for money versus an individual who is portraying a sexual act on-screen as part of their acting performance. The case was not appealed to the U.S. Supreme Court, thus it is only binding in the state of California.

== Early depictions ==
=== Prehistoric ===
Among the oldest surviving examples of erotic depictions are Paleolithic cave paintings and carvings. Some of the more common images are of animals, hunting scenes and depictions of human genitalia. Nude human beings with exaggerated sexual characteristics are depicted in some Paleolithic paintings and artifacts (e.g. Venus figurines). Cave art discovered in the early 2000s at Creswell Crags in England, thought to be more than 12,000 years old, includes some symbols that may be stylized versions of female genitalia. As there was no direct evidence of the use of these objects, it was speculated that they may have been used in religious rituals, or for a more directly sexual purpose.

Archaeologists in Germany reported in April 2005 that they had found what they believed to be a 7,200-year-old scene depicting a male figurine bending over a female figurine in a manner suggestive of sexual intercourse. The male figure had been named Adonis von Zschernitz.

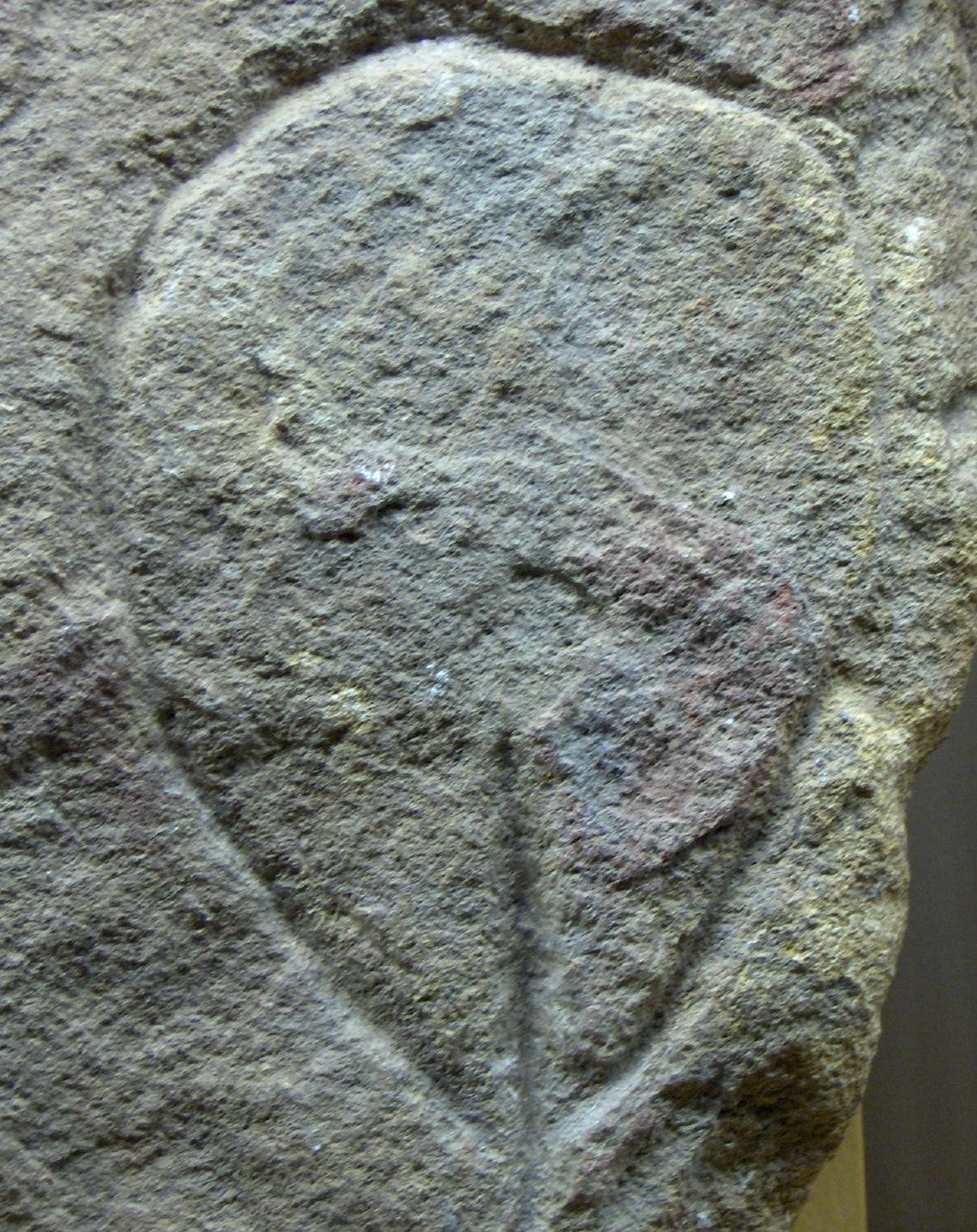
Stone Age petroglyph of a vulva

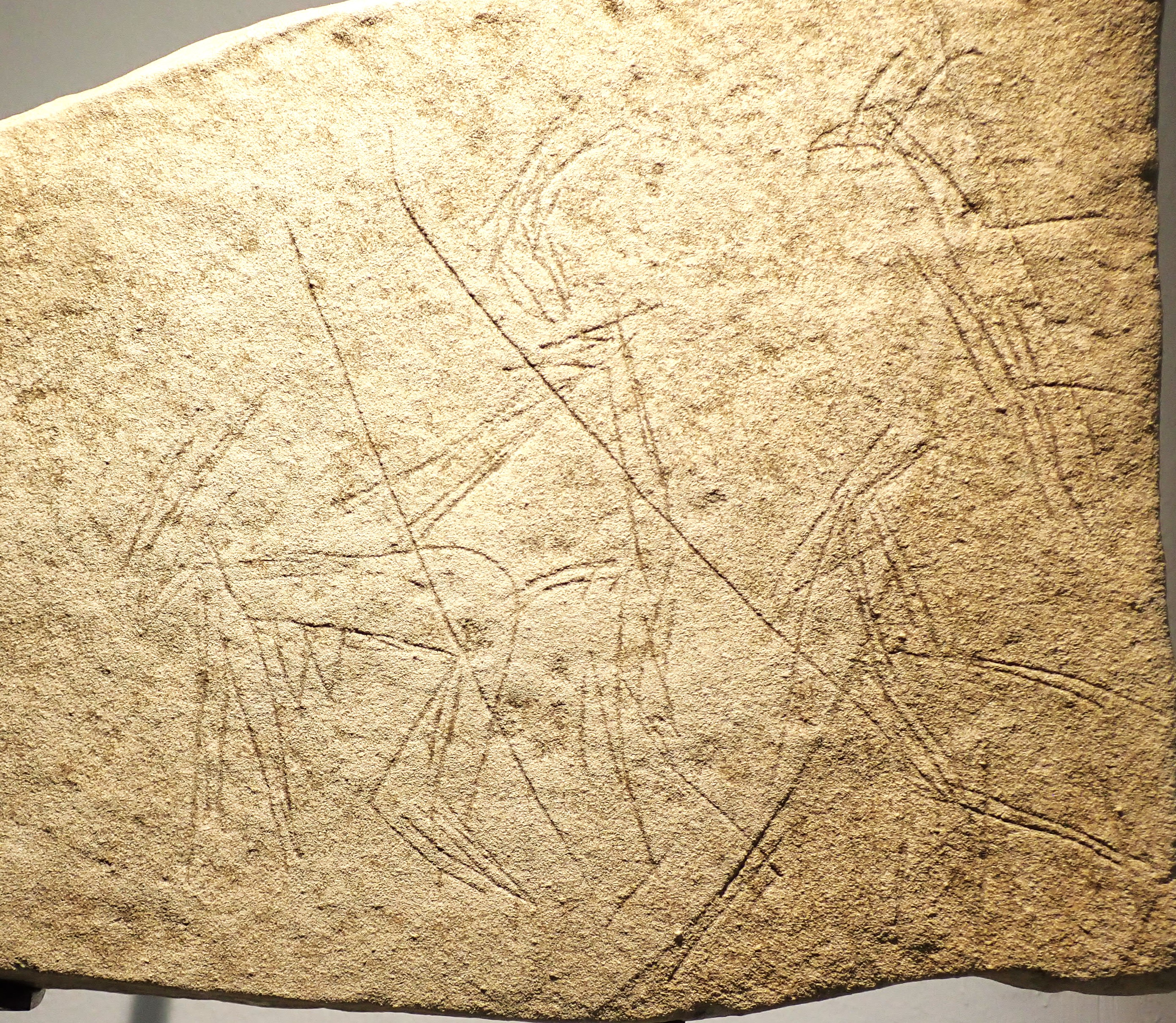
Stone engraving of a sexual act, 3rd-2nd millennium BC, Museum of Sóller (Mallorca)

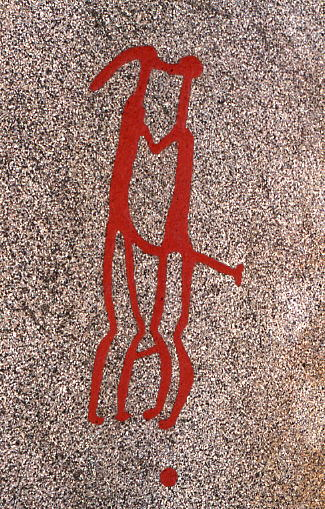
Petroglyph. Vitlycke, Sweden. Bronze-age.

=== Mesopotamia ===
A vast number of artifacts have been discovered from ancient Mesopotamia depicting explicit sexual intercourse. Glyptic art from the Sumerian Early Dynastic Period frequently shows scenes of frontal sex in the missionary position. In Mesopotamian votive plaques from the early second millennium BC, the man is usually shown entering the woman from behind while she bends over, drinking beer through a straw. Middle Assyrian lead votive figurines often represent the man standing and penetrating the woman as she rests on top of an altar. Scholars have traditionally interpreted all these depictions as scenes of ritual sex, but they are more likely to be associated with the cult of Inanna, the goddess of sex and prostitution. Many sexually explicit images were found in the temple of Inanna at Assur, which also contained models of male and female sexual organs, including stone phalli, which may have been worn around the neck as an amulet or used to decorate cult statues, and clay models of the female vulva.

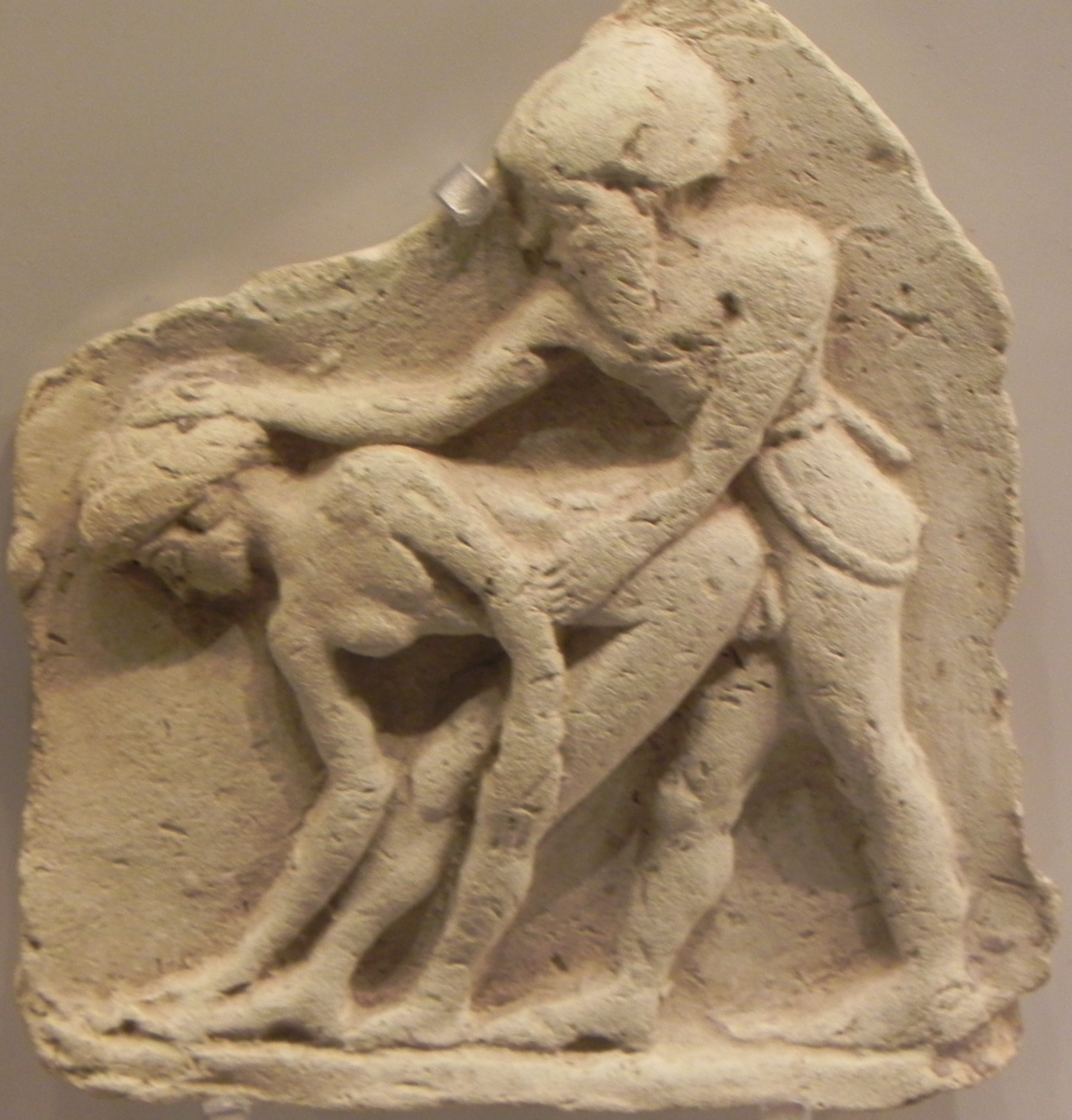
Sex between a female and a male on a clay plaque. Mesopotamia 2000 BCE.

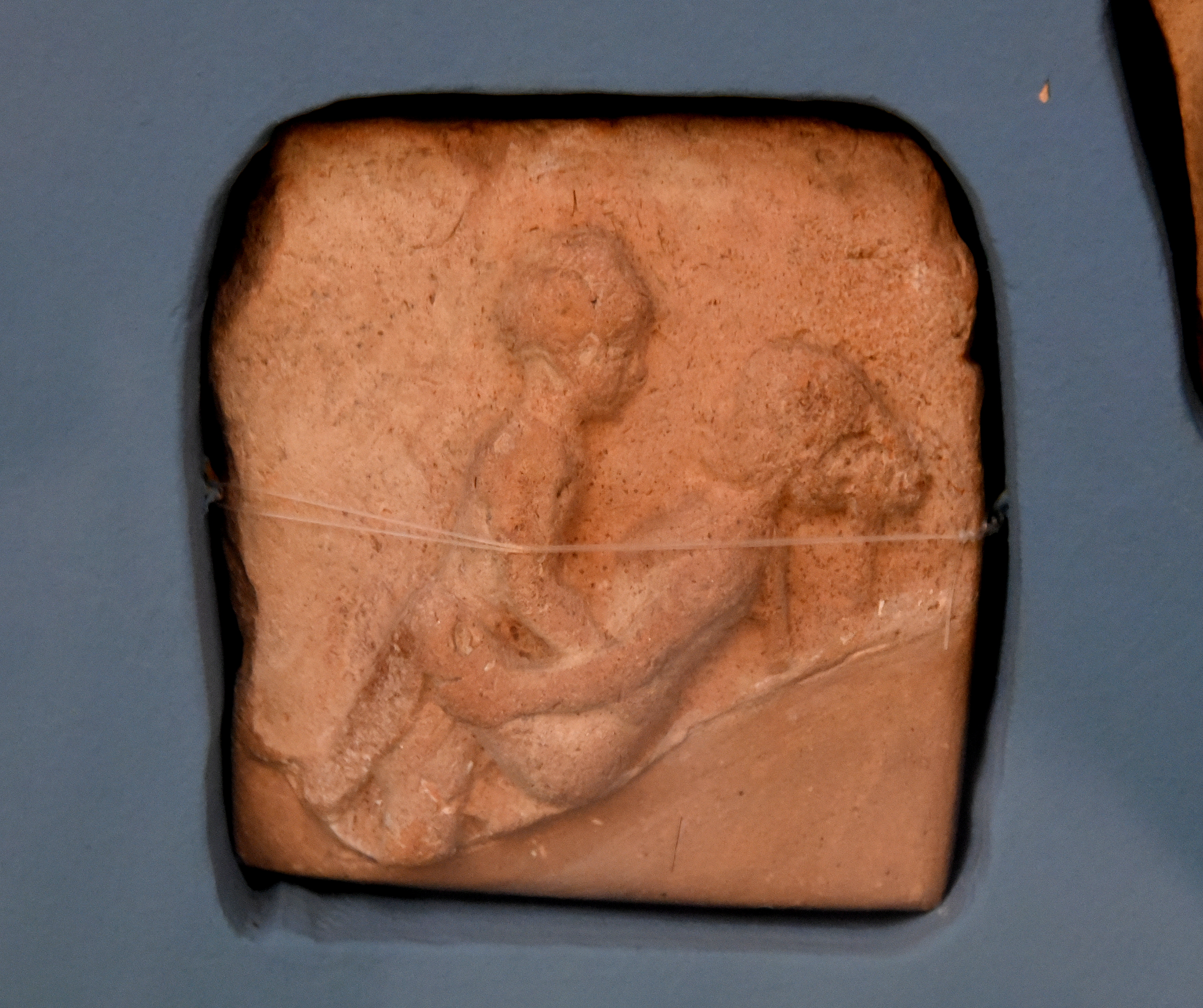
Sex between a female and a male. Terracotta plaque. Old Babylonian Period. Ancient Orient Museum, Istanbul, around 2000–1500 BCE.

=== Egypt ===
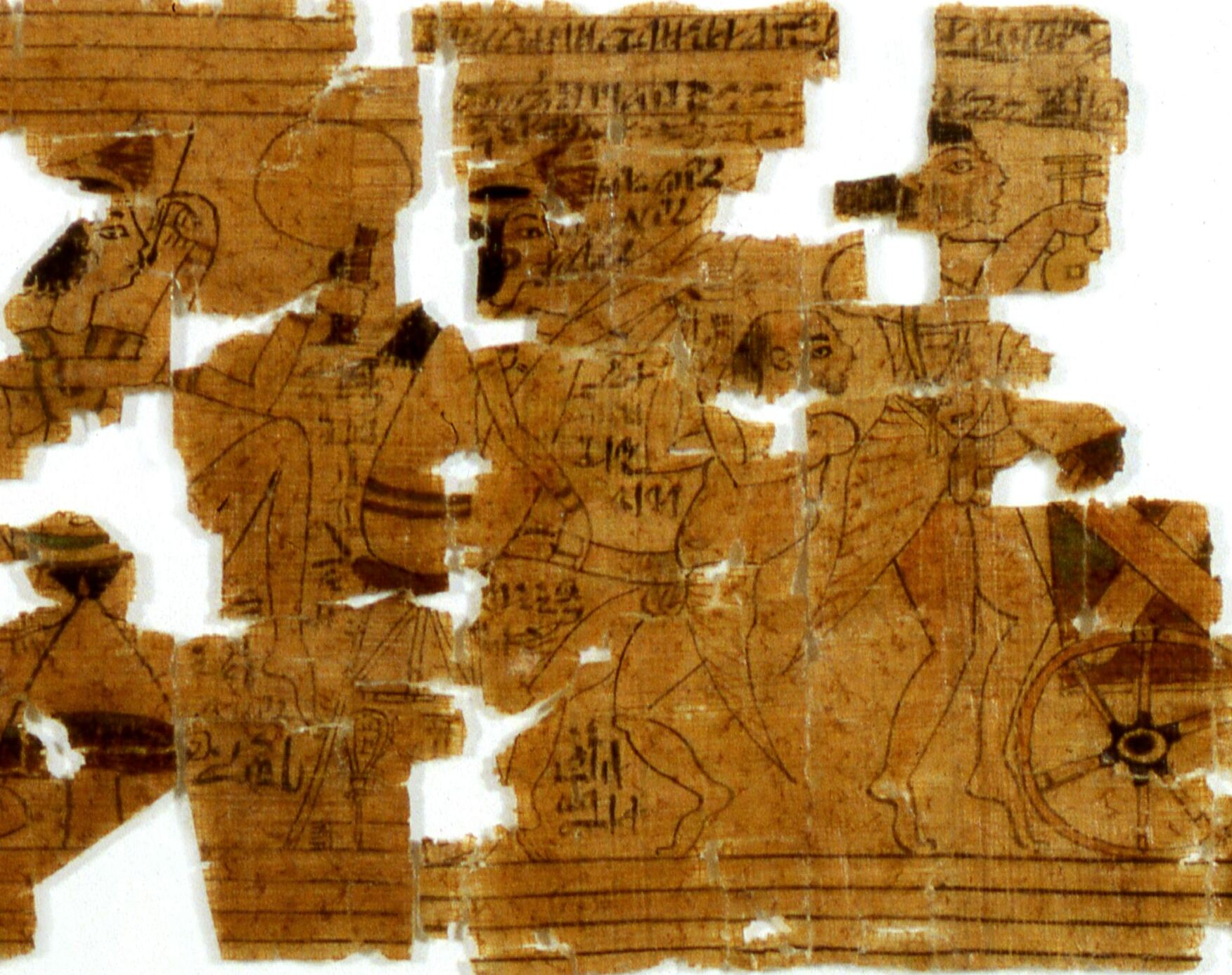
A detail from Turin Erotic Papyrus

Depictions of sexual intercourse were not part of the general repertory of ancient Egyptian formal art, but rudimentary sketches of sexual intercourse have been found on pottery fragments and in graffiti. The Turin Erotic Papyrus (Papyrus 55001) is a 8.5 feet (2.6 m) by 10 inches (25 cm) Egyptian papyrus scroll discovered at Deir el-Medina, the last two-thirds of which consist of a series of twelve vignettes showing men and women in various sexual positions. The men in the illustrations are "scruffy, balding, short, and paunchy" with exaggeratedly large genitalia and do not conform to Egyptian standards of physical attractiveness, but the women are nubile and they are shown with objects from traditional erotic iconography, such as convolvulus leaves and, in some scenes, they are even holding items traditionally associated with Hathor, the goddess of love, such as lotus flowers, monkeys, and sistra. The scroll was probably painted in the Ramesside period (1292–1075 BC) and its high artistic quality indicates that was produced for a wealthy audience. No other similar scrolls have yet been discovered.

=== Greek and Roman ===
The ancient Greeks often painted sexual scenes on their ceramics, many of them famous for being some of the earliest depictions of same-sex relations and pederasty. Greek art often portrays sexual activity, but it is impossible to distinguish between what to them was illegal or immoral since the ancient Greeks did not have a concept of pornography. Their art simply reflects scenes from daily life, some more sexual than others. Carved phalli can be seen in places of worship such as the temple of Dionysus on Delos, while a common household item and protective charm was the herm, a statue consisting of a head on a square plinth with a prominent phallus on the front. The Greek male ideal had a small penis, an aesthetic the Romans later adopted. The Greeks also created the first well-known instance of lesbian eroticism in the West, with Sappho's Hymn to Aphrodite and other homoerotic works.

There are numerous sexually explicit paintings and sculptures from the ruined Roman buildings in Pompeii and Herculaneum but the original purposes of the depictions can vary. On one hand, in the Villa of the Mysteries, there is a ritual flagellation scene that is clearly associated with a religious cult and this image can be seen as having religious significance rather than sexual. On the other hand, graphic paintings in a brothel advertise sexual services in murals above each door. In Pompeii, phalli and testicles engraved in the sidewalks were created to aid visitors in finding their way by pointing to the prostitution and entertainment district as well as general decoration. The Romans considered depictions of sex to be decoration in good taste, and indeed the pictures reflect the sexual mores and practices of their culture, as on the Warren Cup. Sex acts that were considered taboo (such as oral sex) were depicted in baths for comic effect. Large phalli were often used near entryways, for the phallus was a good-luck charm, and the carvings were common in homes. One of the first objects excavated when the complex was discovered was a marble statue showing the god Pan having sex with a goat, a detailed depiction of bestiality considered so obscene that it was not on public display until the year 2000 and remains in the Secret Museum, Naples.

Show large gallery
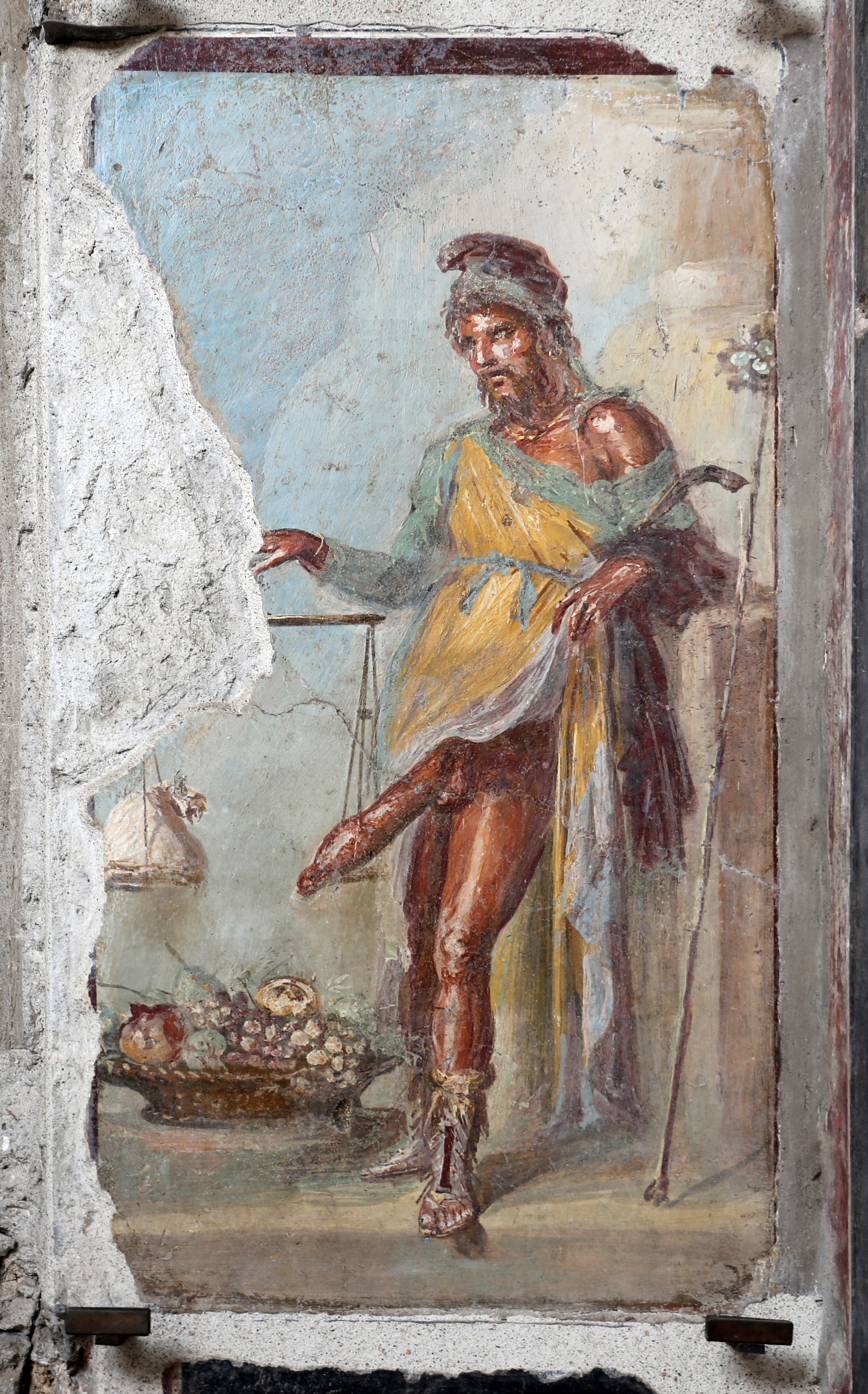
A Priapus figure. Large phalli were considered undesirable for men to possess and often depicted for comic effect in ancient Rome. Wall painting Pompeii.

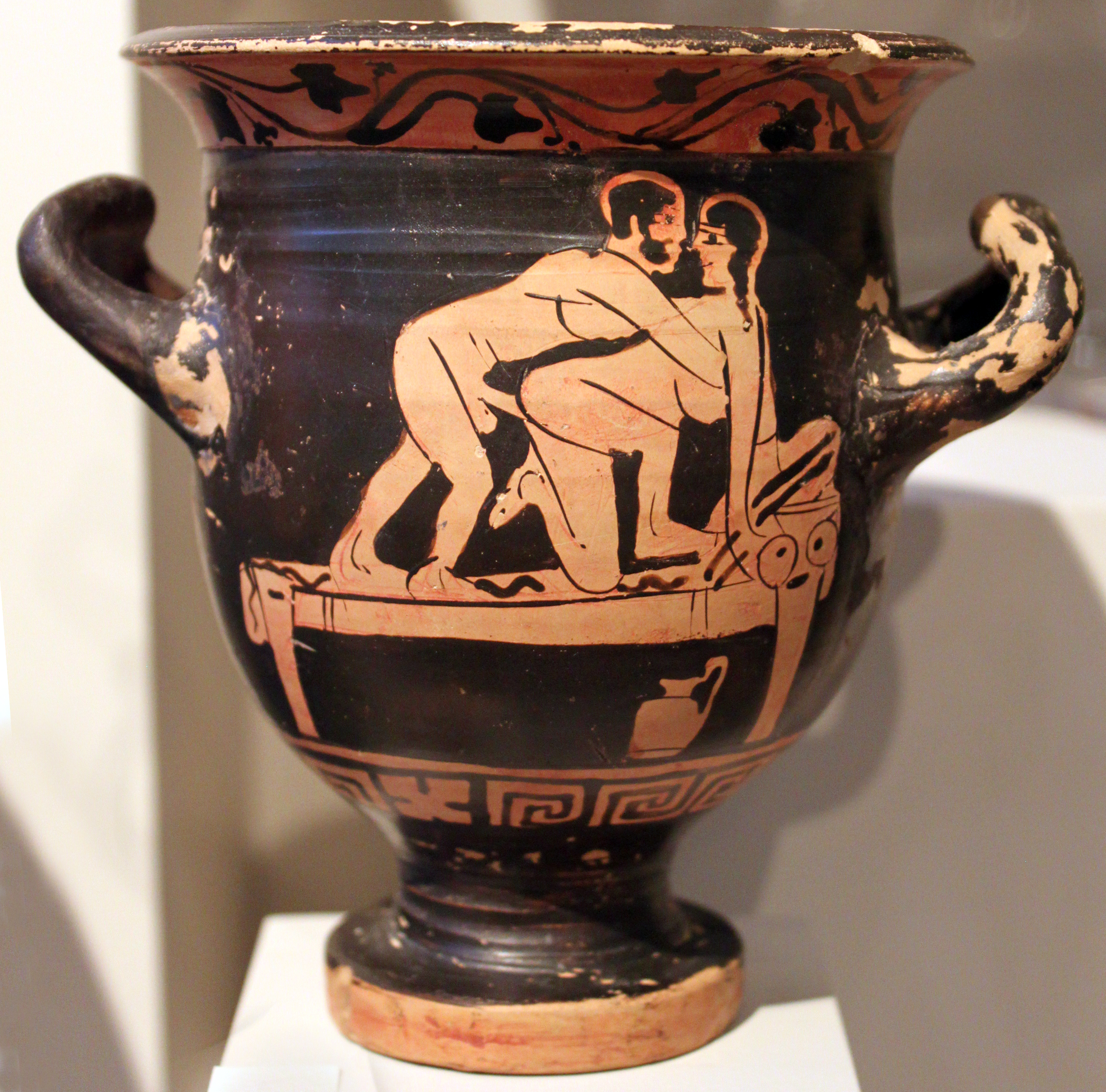
Bell Krater. Ancient Greek. Late 5th to 4th century BCE

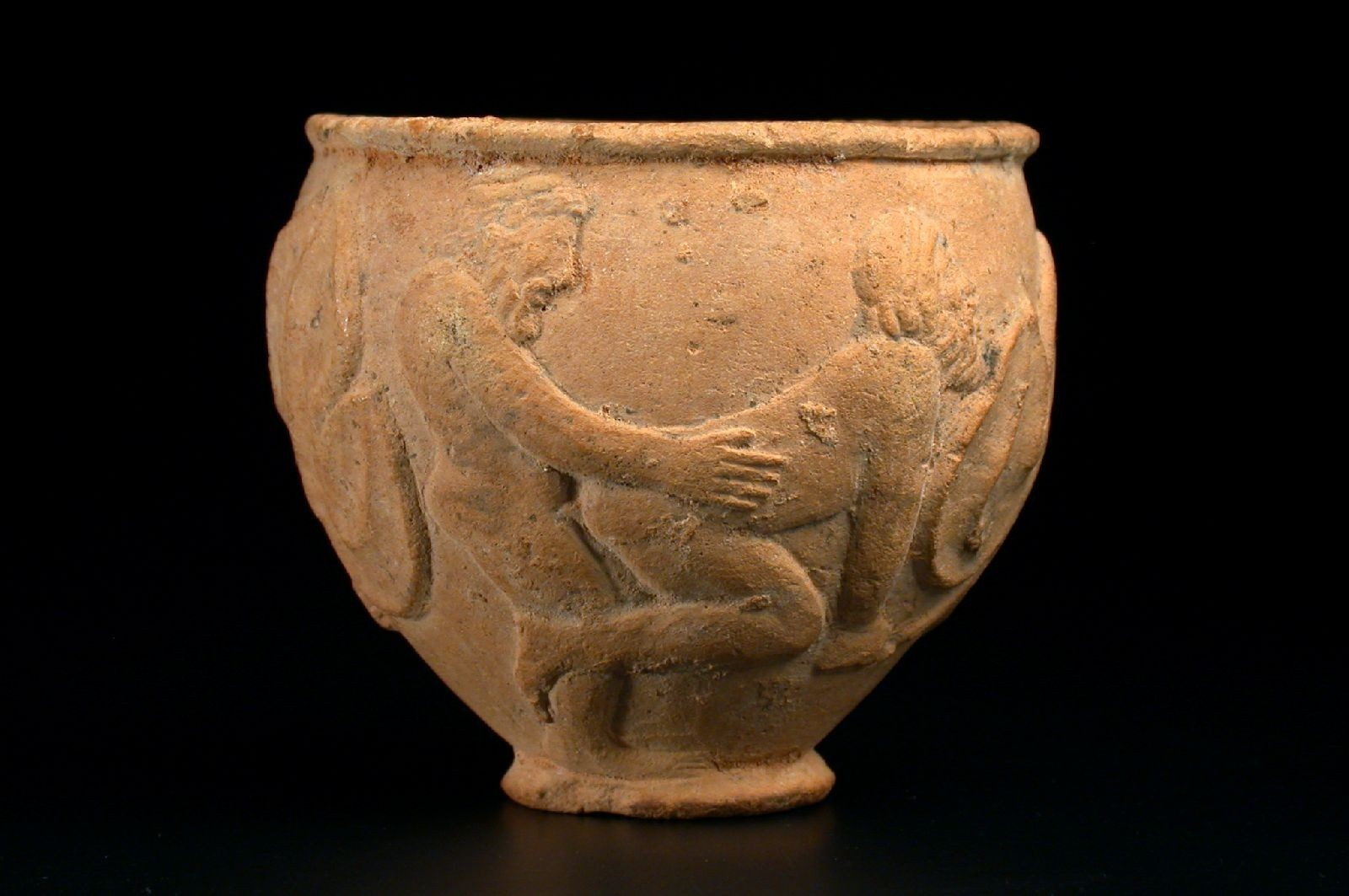
Anal sex between two males. Drinking cup. Greek; archaic period. 550-500 BCE

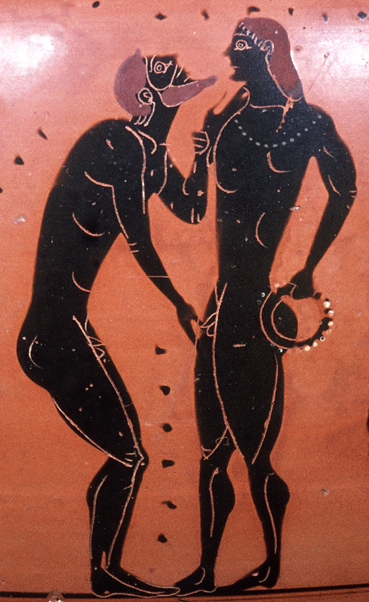
A homosexual courtship scene on an Athenian black-figure amphora (c. 540 BCE)

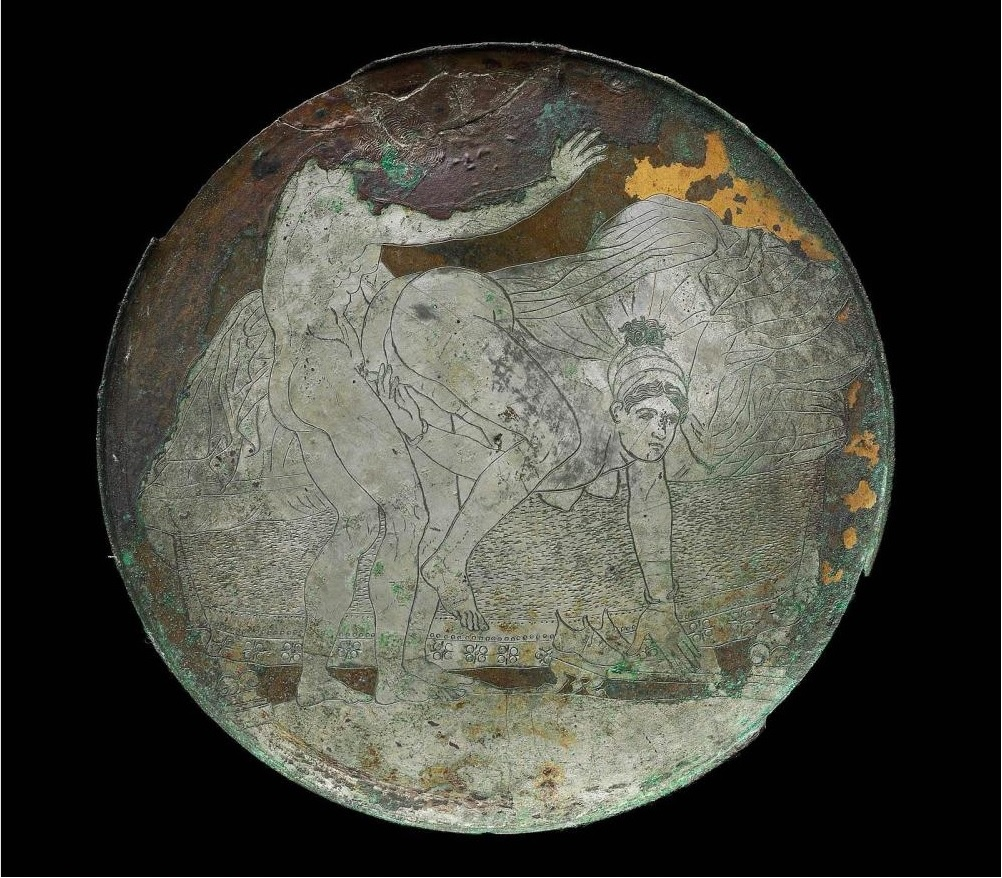
Inner casing of box mirror container with an engraving on a silvered surface. Ancient Greek. Museum of Fine Arts, Boston, around 340–320 BCE

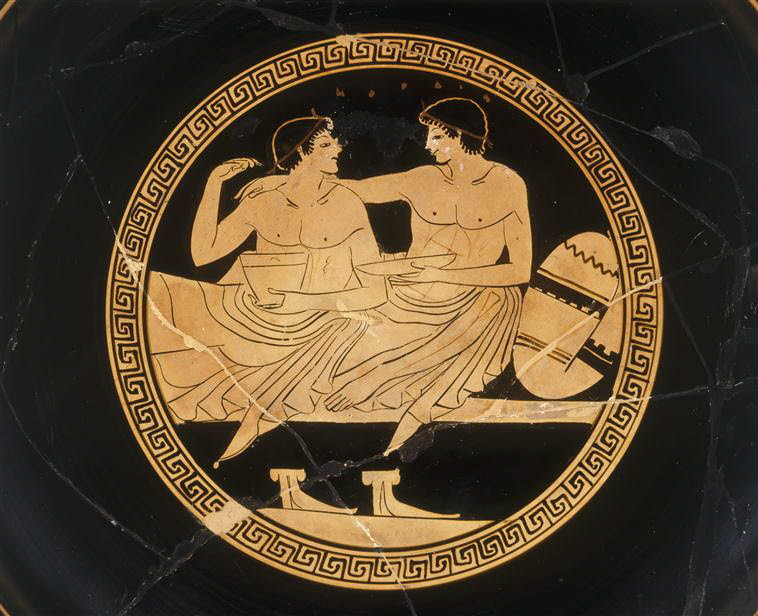
This image has been given the description of a "...courting couple at the symposium." and a "Symposium scene with youths.". Interior of an Attic cup. Artist; Painter from Colmar. Around 500 - 450 BCE. Louvre

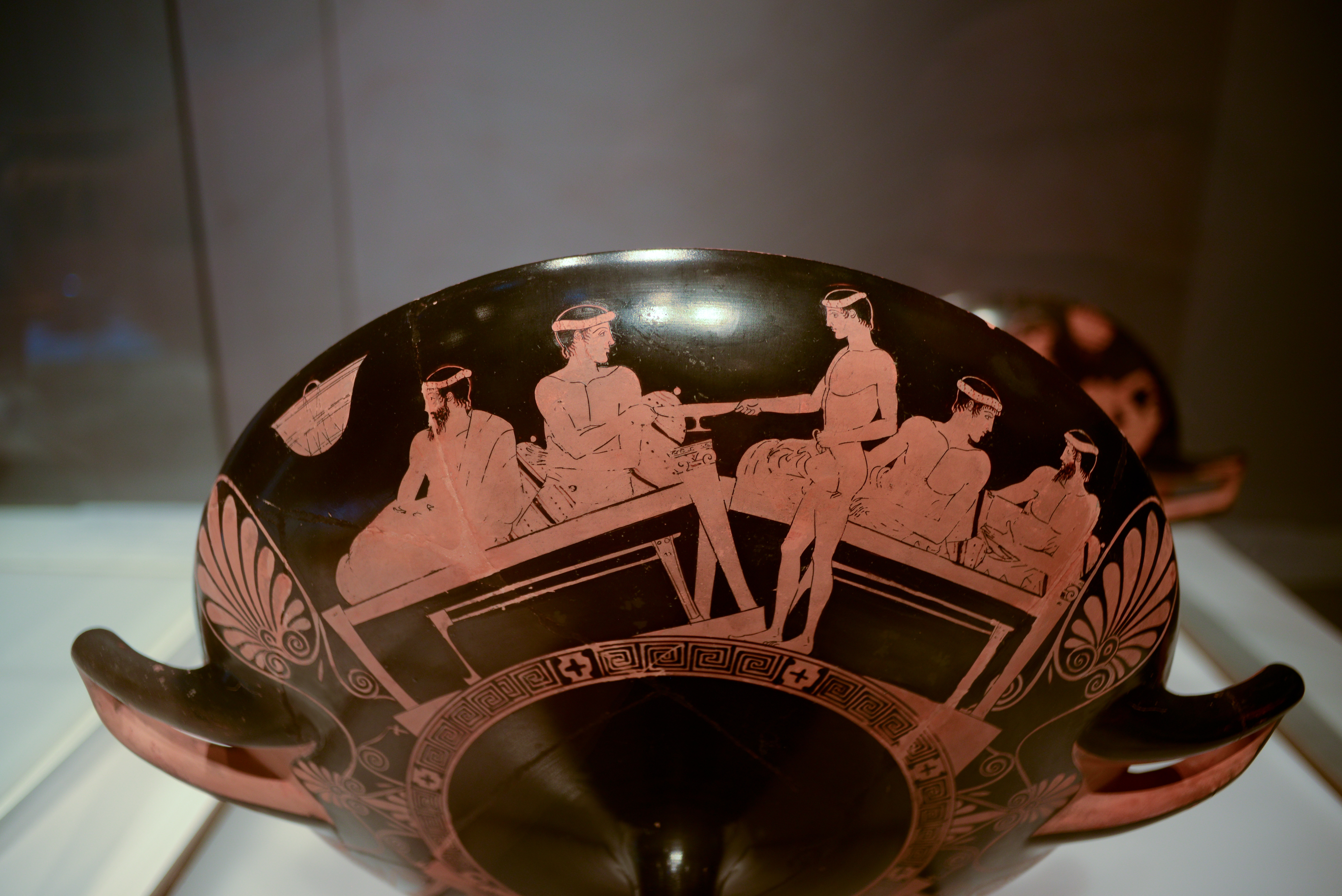
Symposium scene with courting couples. Attic kylix. Around 460-450 BCE. Louvre

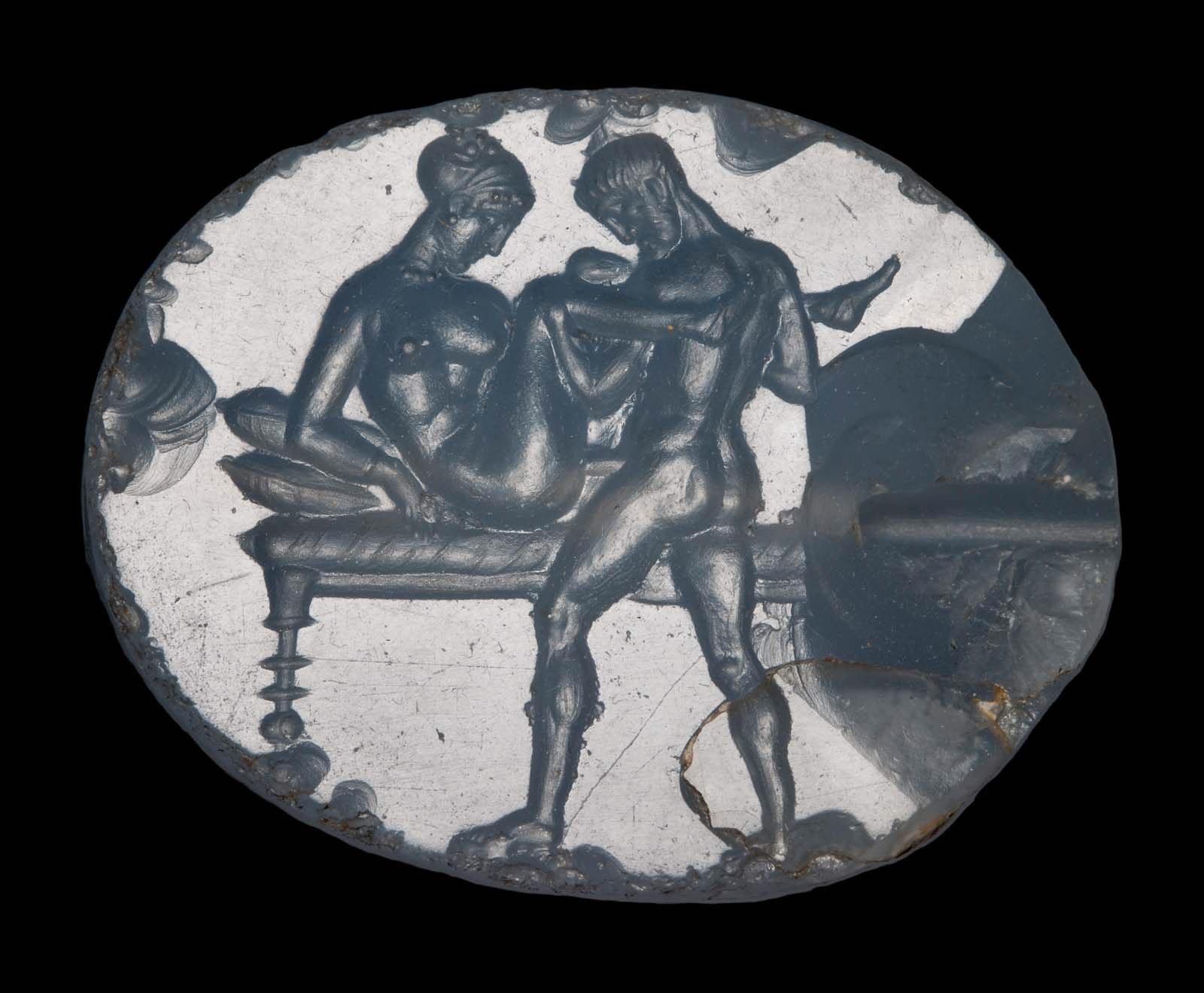
Engraving of a sexual scene on an ancient Greek gem. late 5th to early 4th century BCE

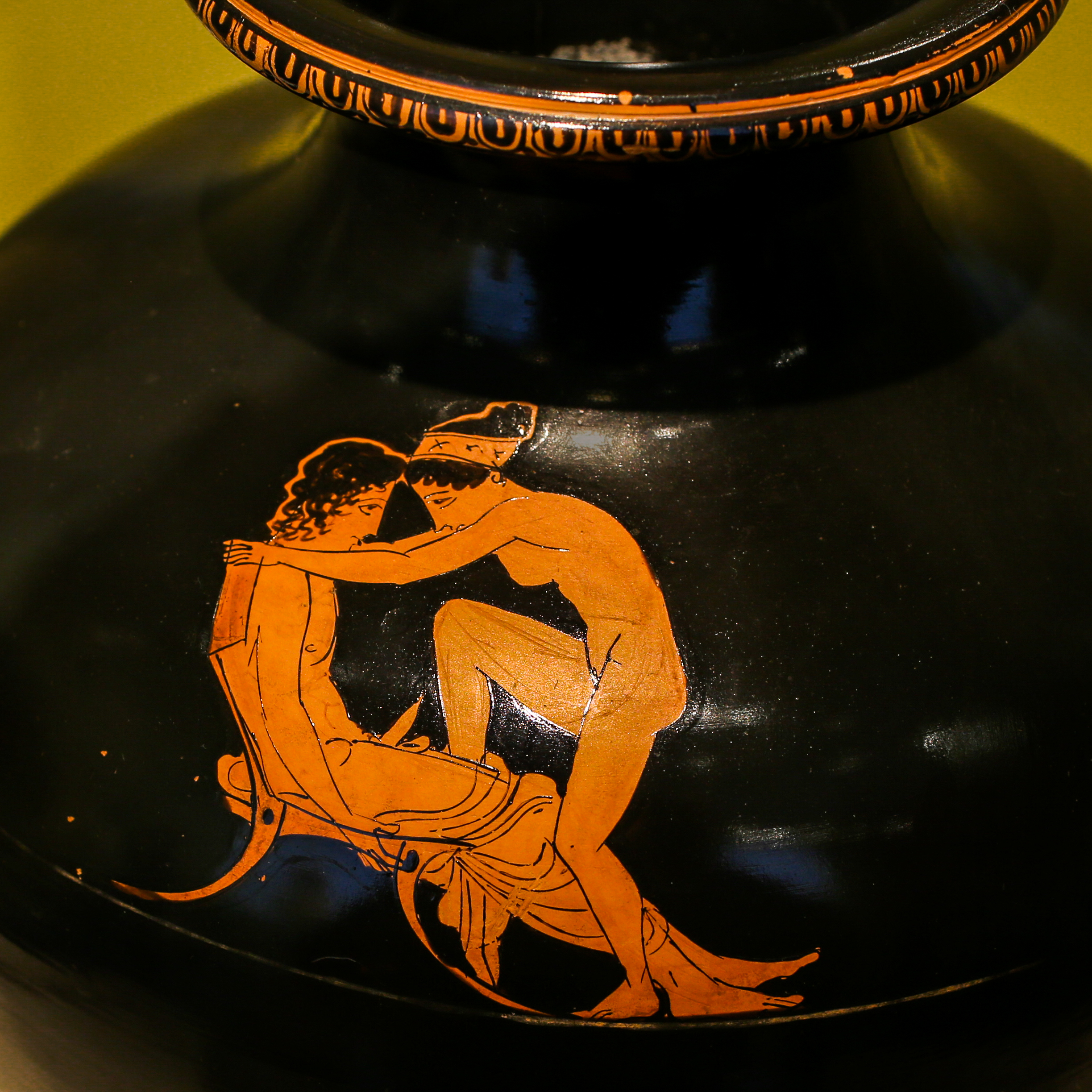
Oinochoe. The Shuvalov Painter. Around 430–420 BCE.

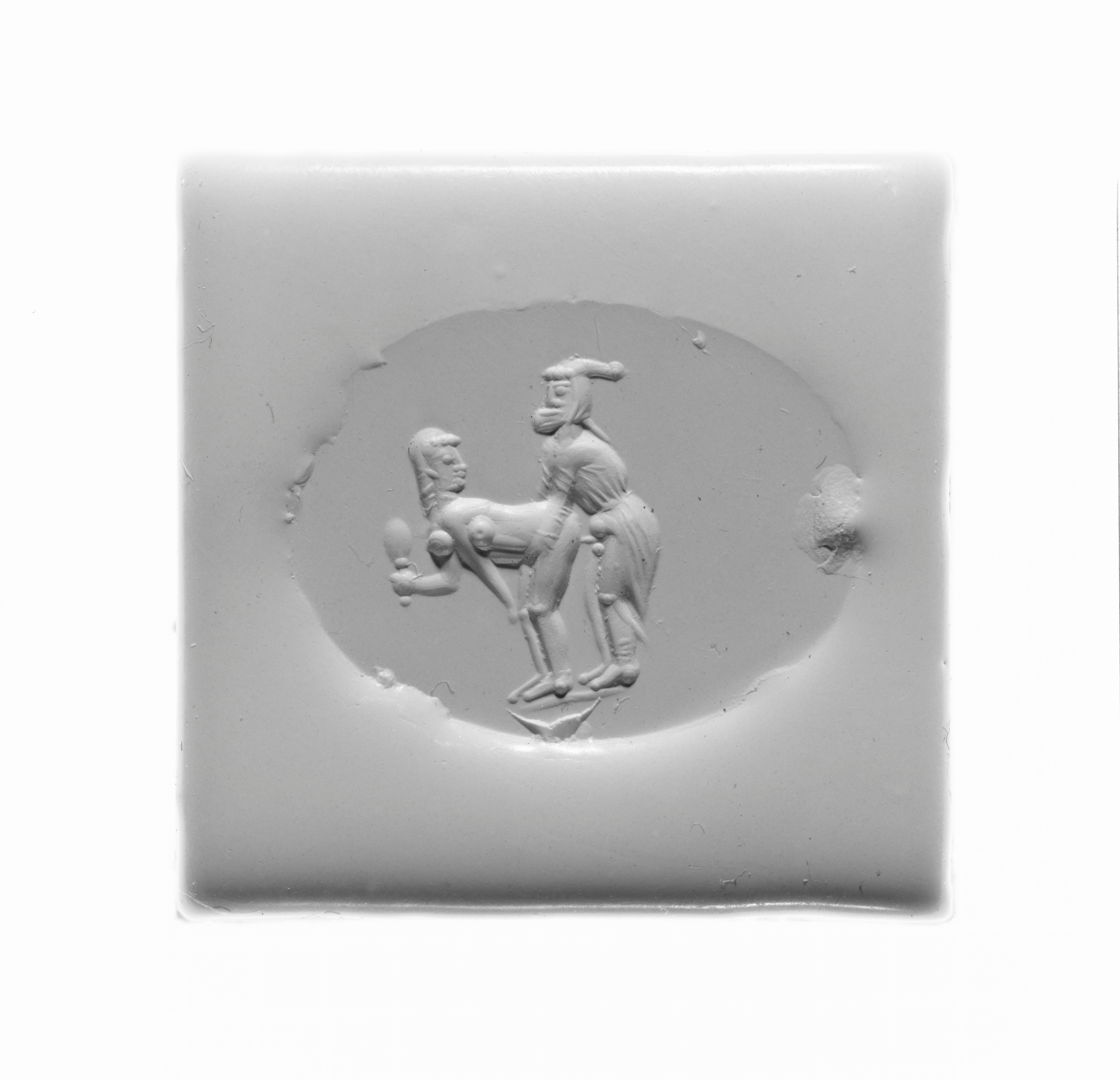
Sex between a female and a male. Engraved scaraboid (gem), White chalcedony. Greco-Persian, 4th century BCE.

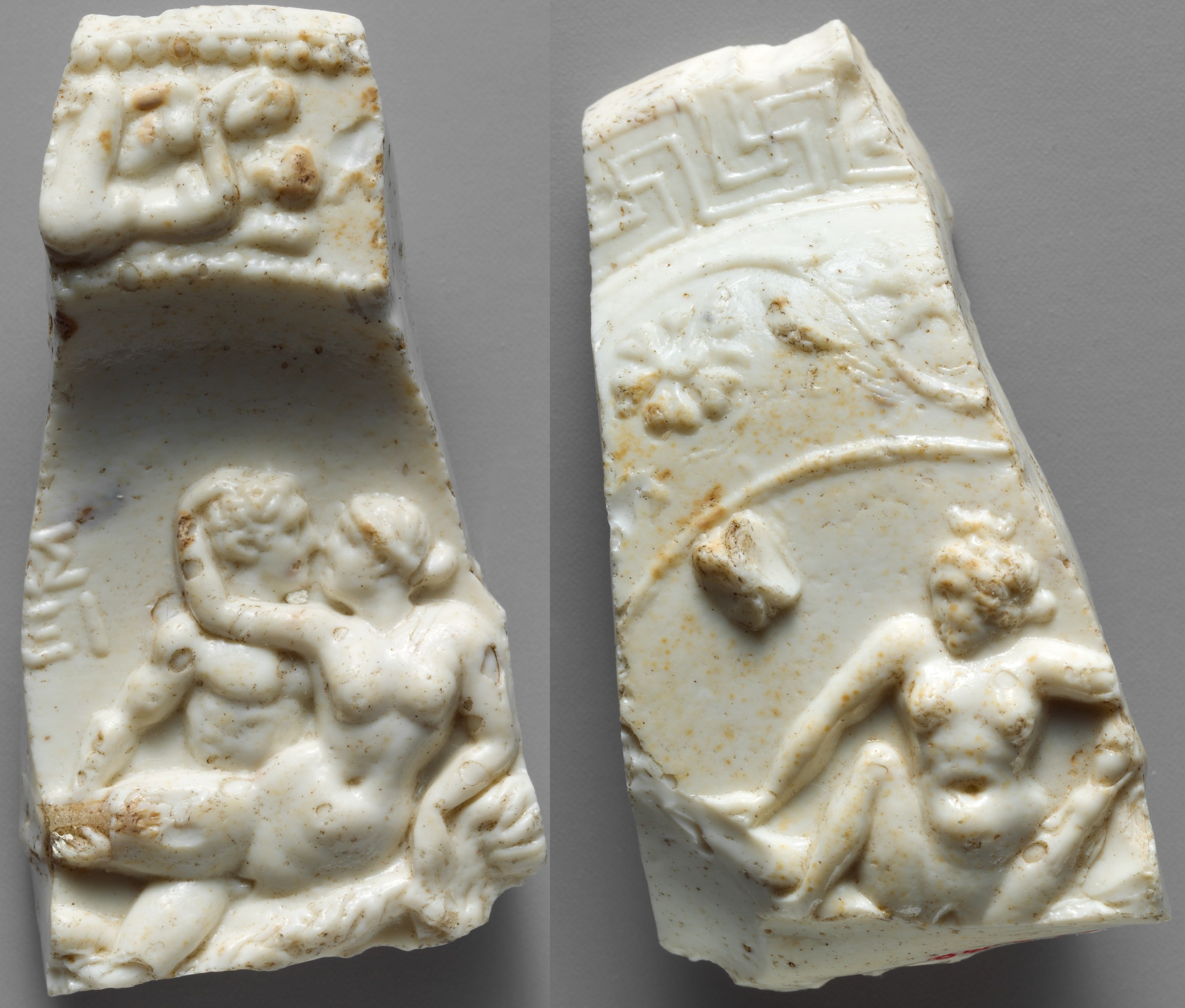
Glass bowl fragment. The bowl had twelve images of sex on its interior and one image of sex on its exterior. Roman. End of 1st century BCE to beginning of 1st century CE

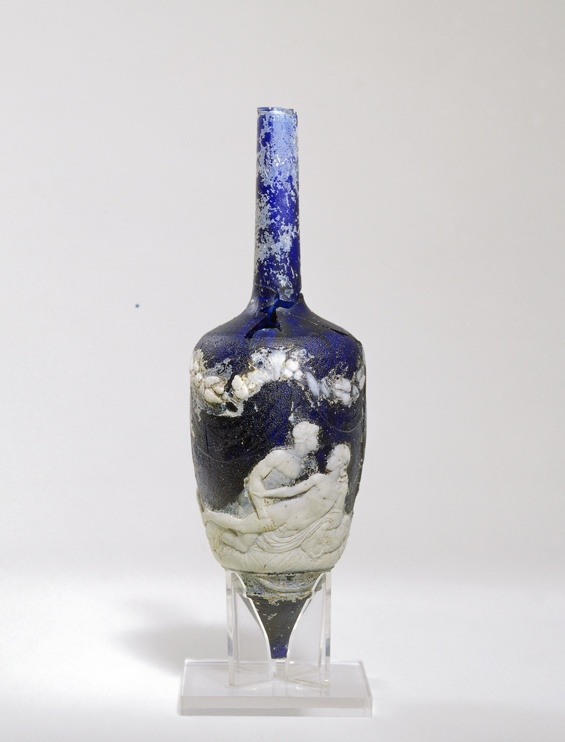
Engraving of two males in an erotic scene on a glass bottle. Ancient Roman. 25 BCE - 14 CE

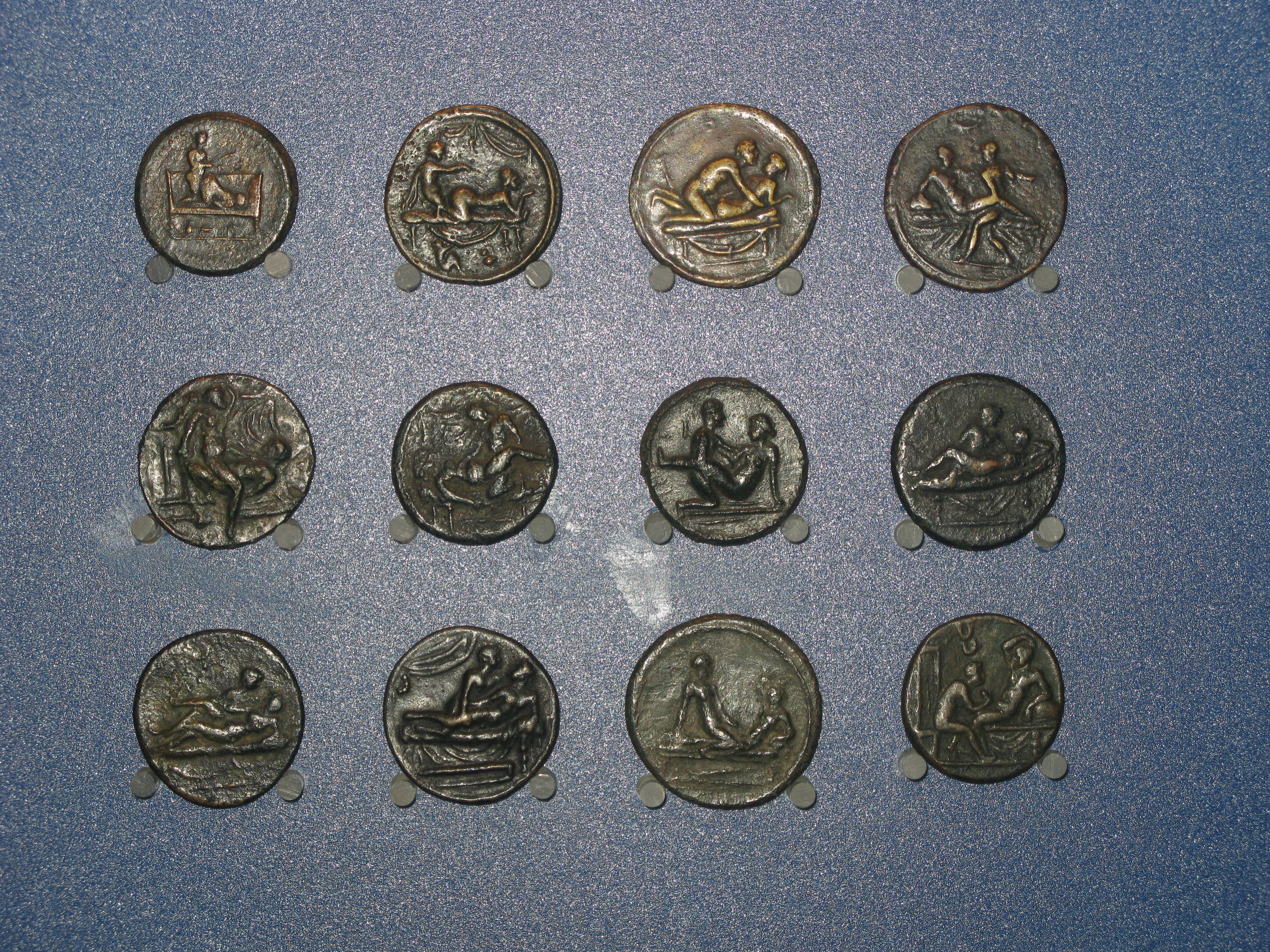
Erotic scenes on Roman Spintria tokens. Hunterian Museum and Art Gallery, Glasgow. Around 22 - 37 CE

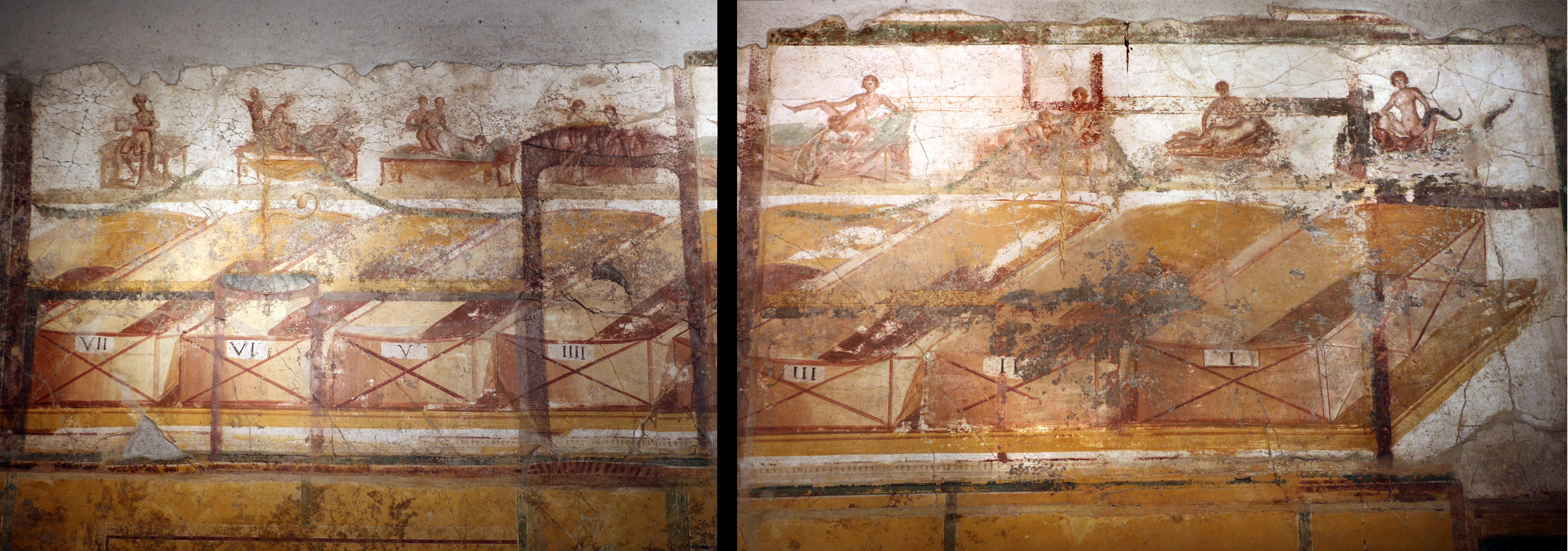
A wall painting in the dressing room of the suburban baths in Pompeii. There are seven sexual scenes in this wall painting. 62 to 79 CE

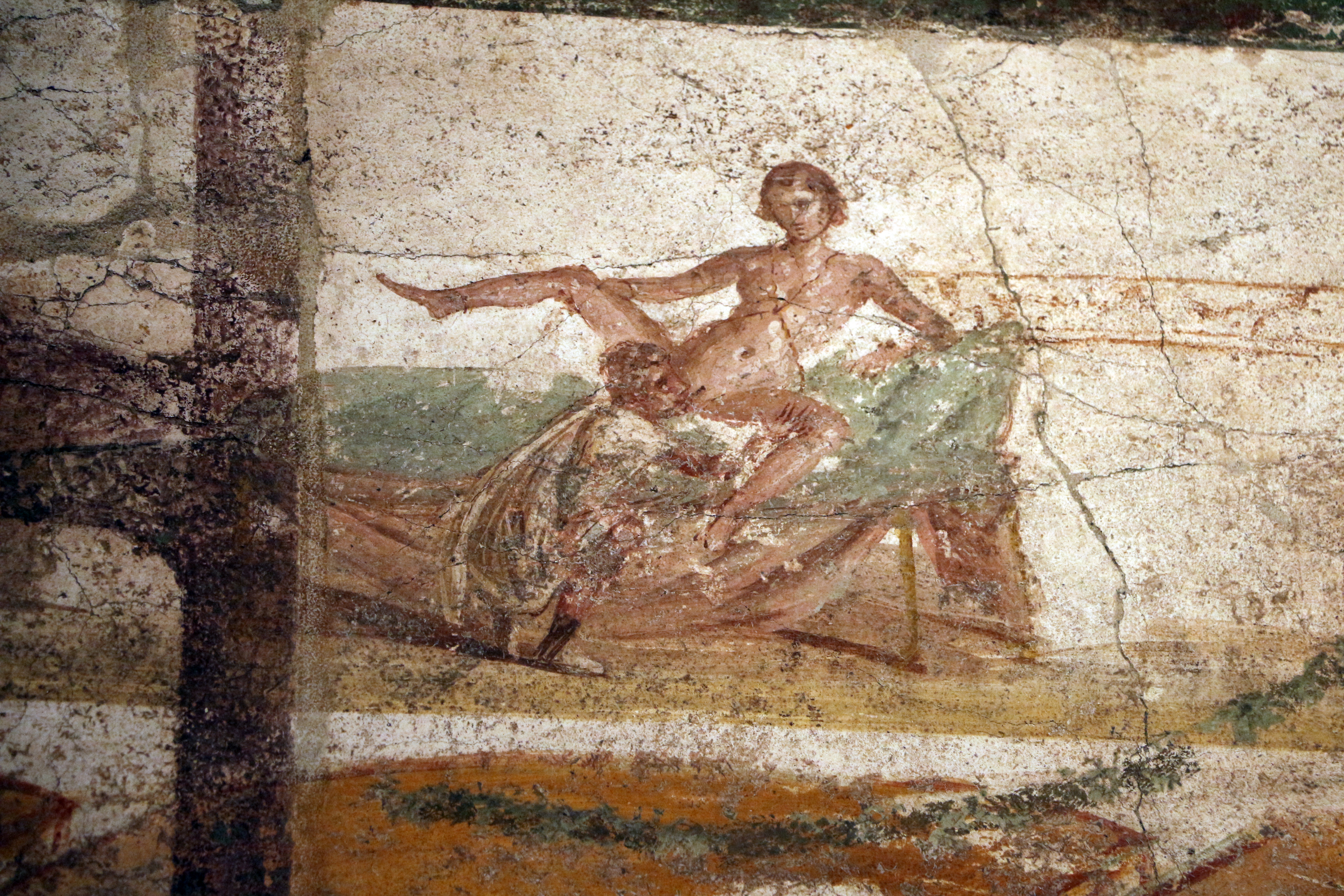
Cunnilingus on a wall painting from the suburban baths. Pompeii. 62 to 79 CE

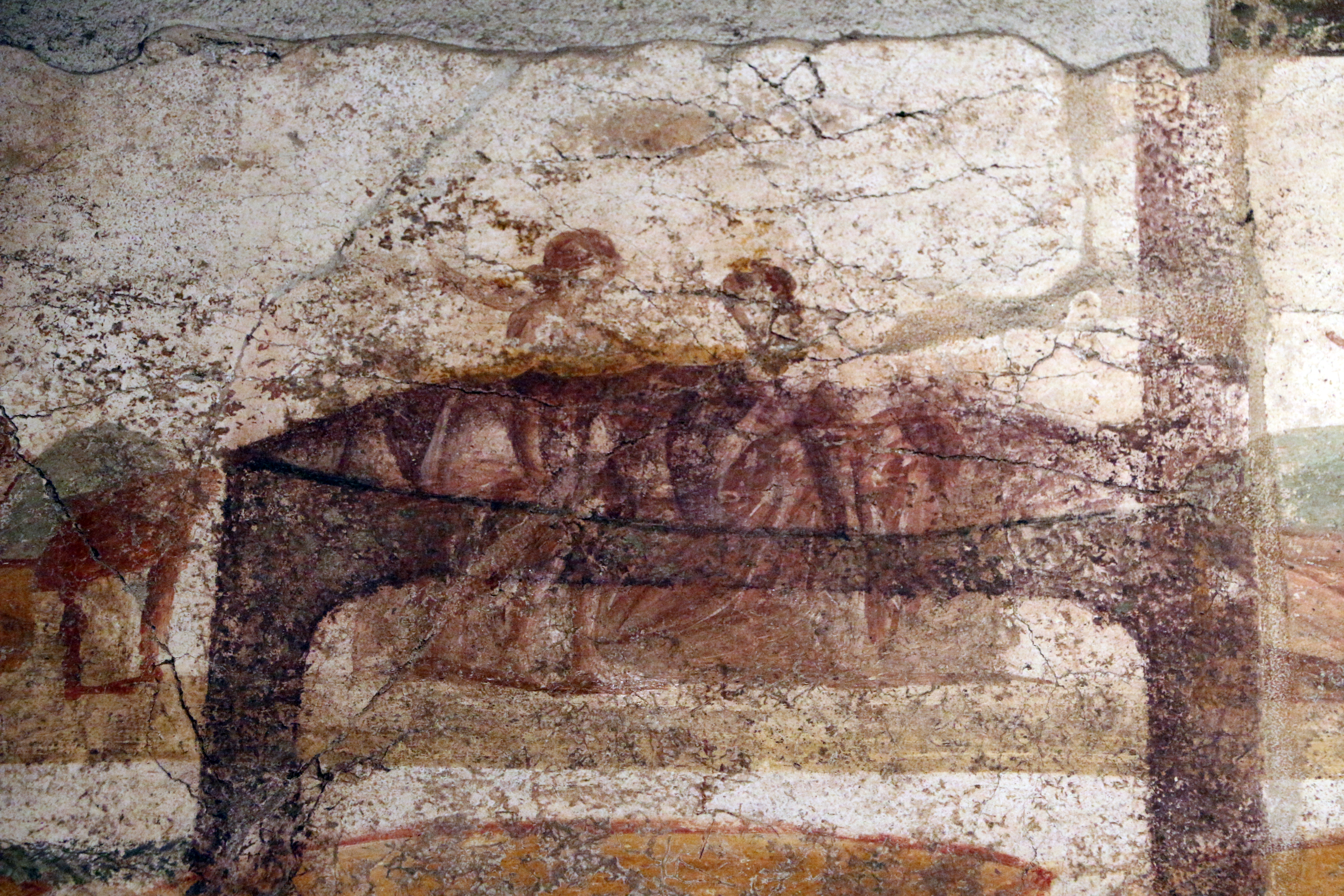
A lesbian sex scene on a wall painting from the suburban baths. Pompeii. 62 to 79 CE

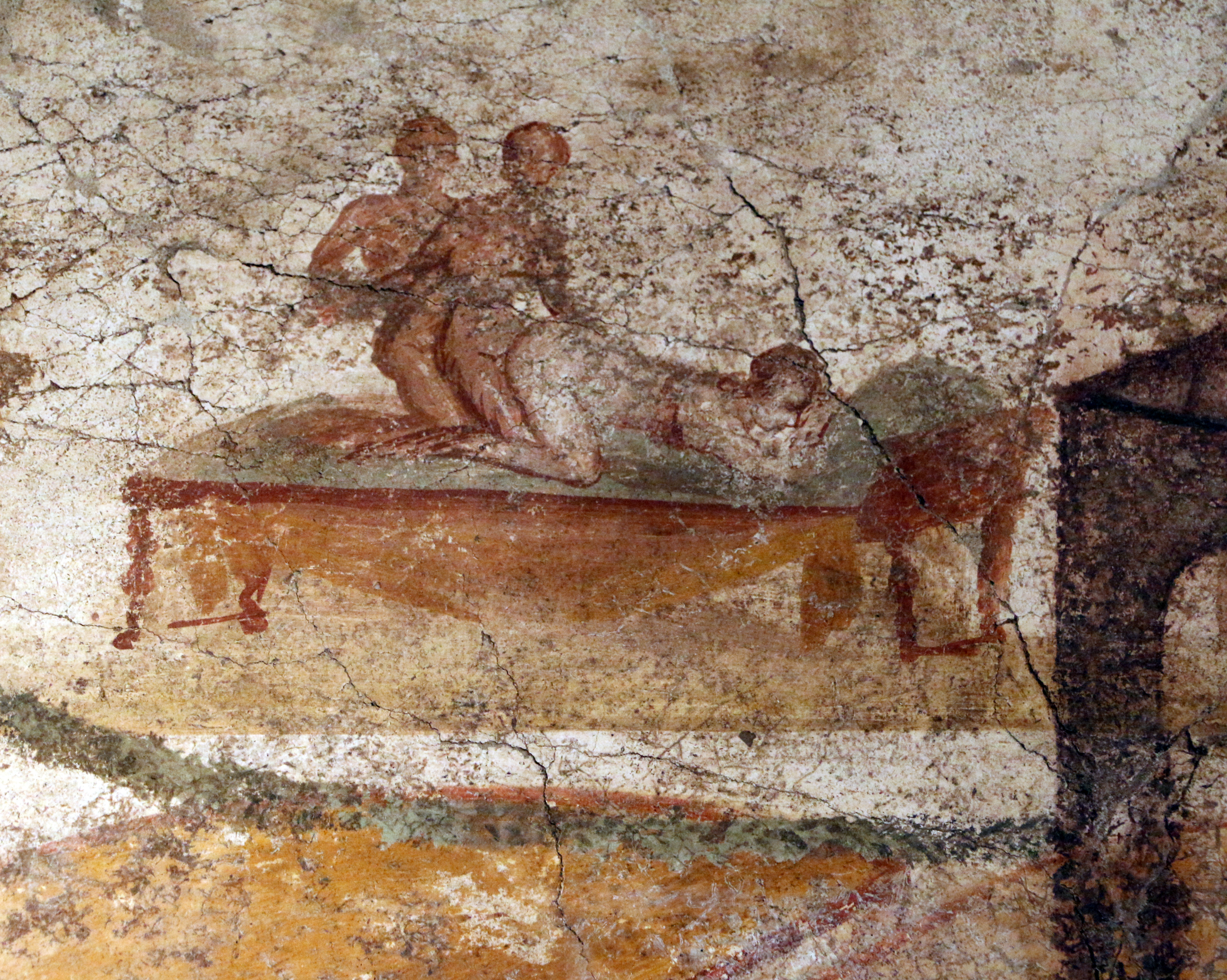
A female and two males on a wall painting from the suburban baths. Pompeii. 62 to 79 CE

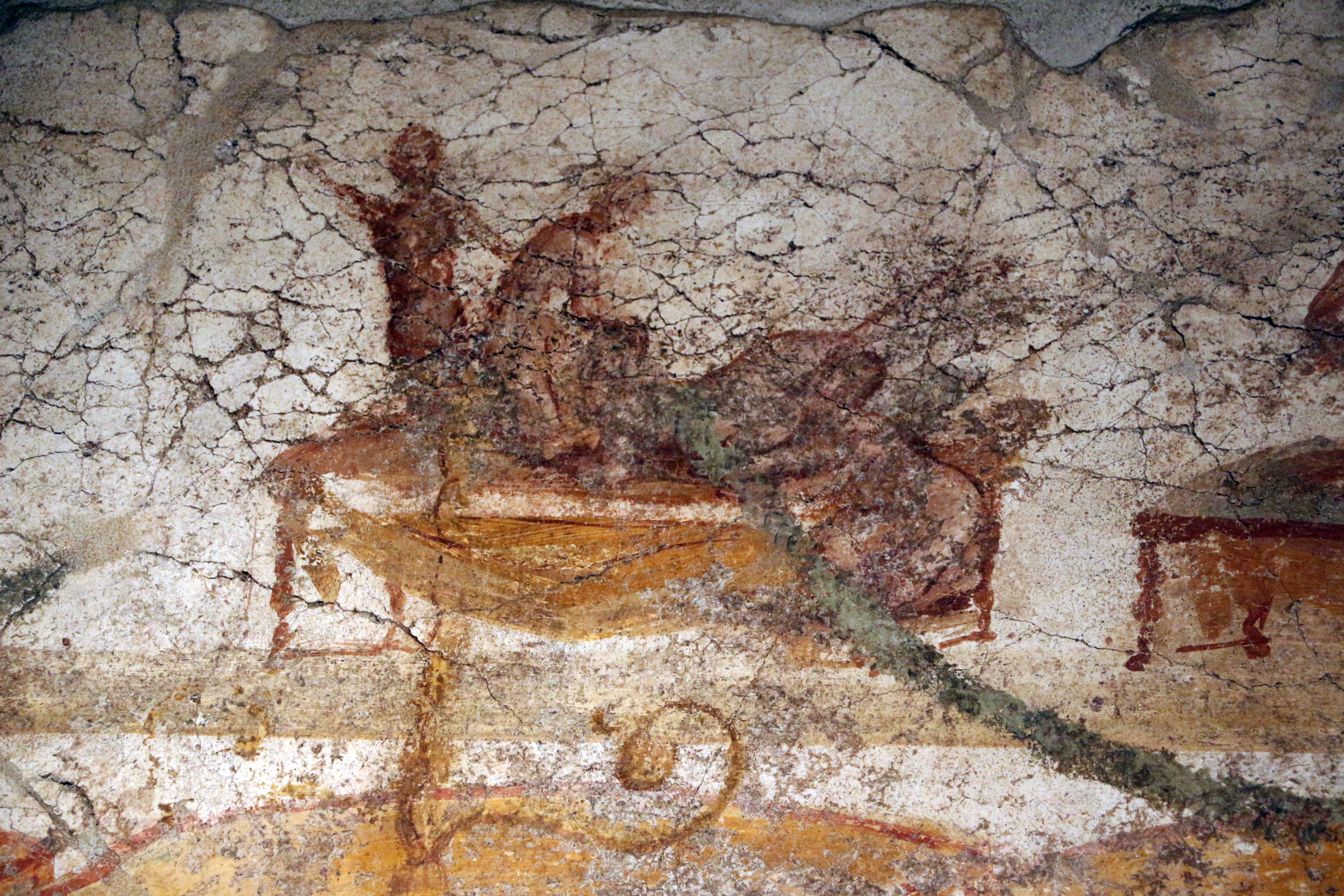
Cunnilingus, fellatio and anal sex between two females and two males. Wall painting. suburban baths, Pompeii. 62 to 79 CE

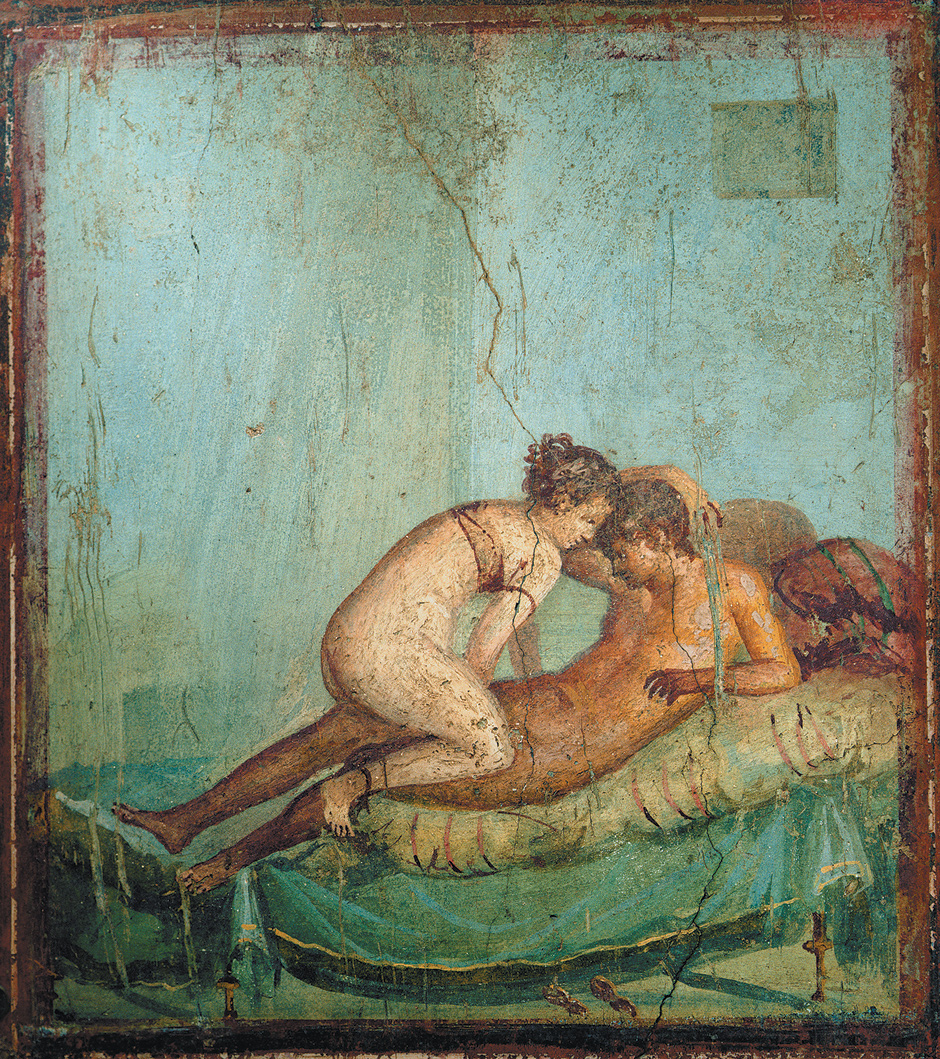
An erotic scene between a female and a male. Wall painting, Pompeii, 1st century.

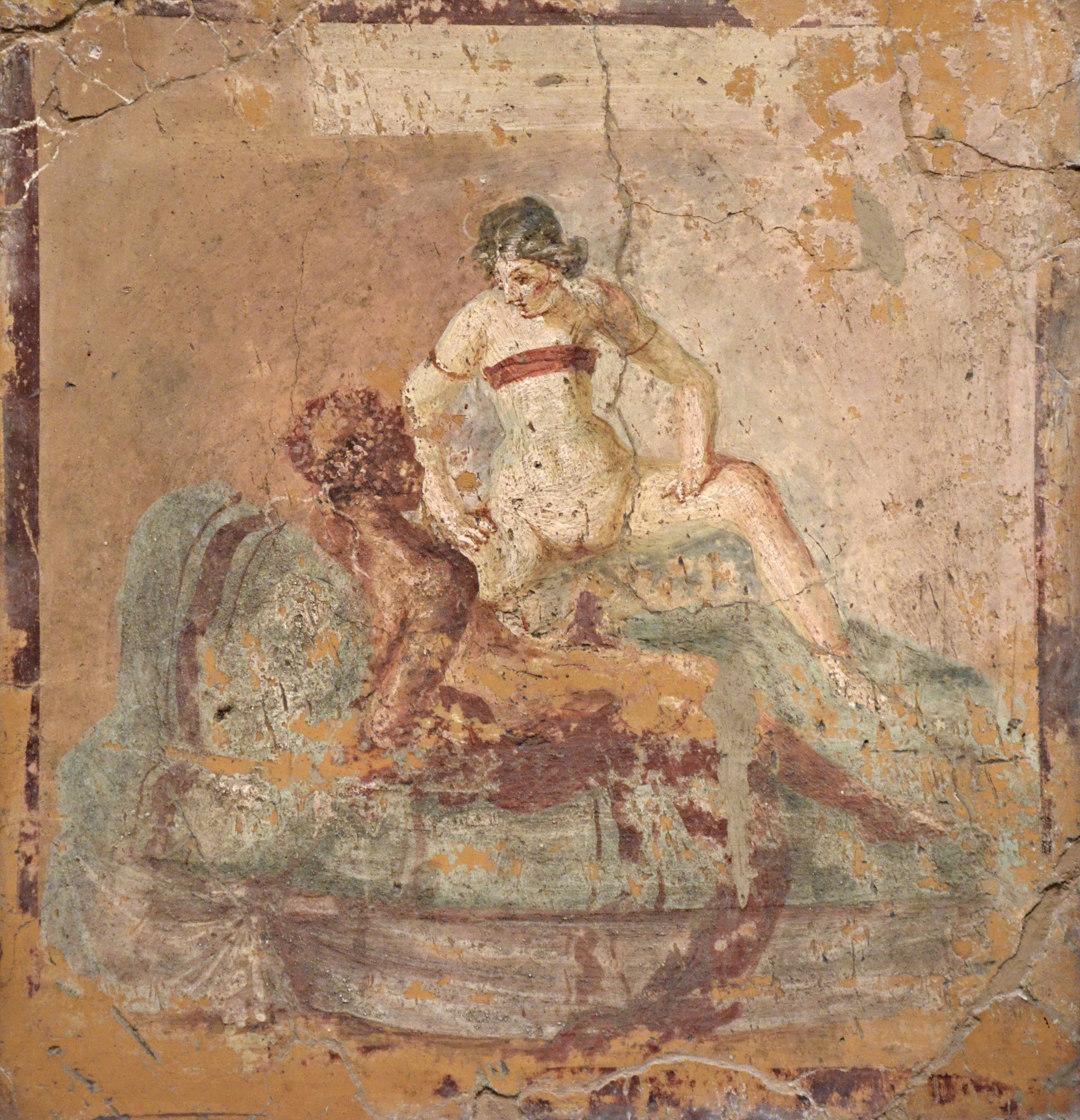
Sex between a female and a male.The figure on the left has a garland of rose petals around their head. The figure to the right is wearing a strophium which is a kind of bra or bikini top. Pompeii. Around 70CE

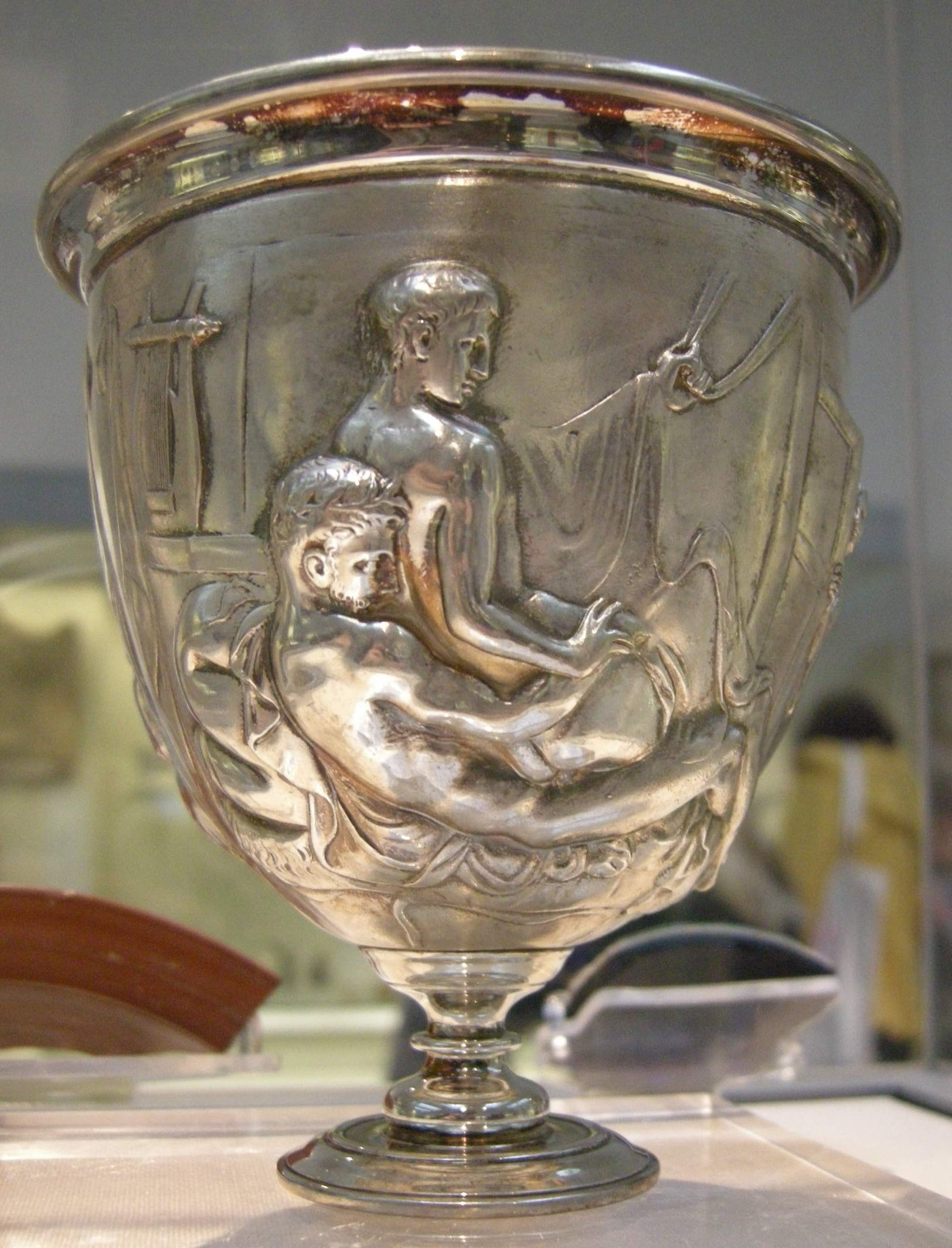
Side A of the Warren Cup

=== Peru ===
The Moche of Peru are another ancient people that sculpted explicit scenes of sex into their pottery. At least 500 Moche ceramics have sexual themes.

Rafael Larco Hoyle speculates that their purpose was very different from that of other early cultures. He states that the Moche believed that the world of the dead was the exact opposite of the world of the living. Therefore, for funeral offerings, they made vessels showing sex acts such as masturbation, fellatio and anal sex that would not result in offspring. The hope was that in the world of the dead, they would take on their opposite meaning and result in fertility. The erotic pottery of the Moche is depicted in Hoyle's book Checan.

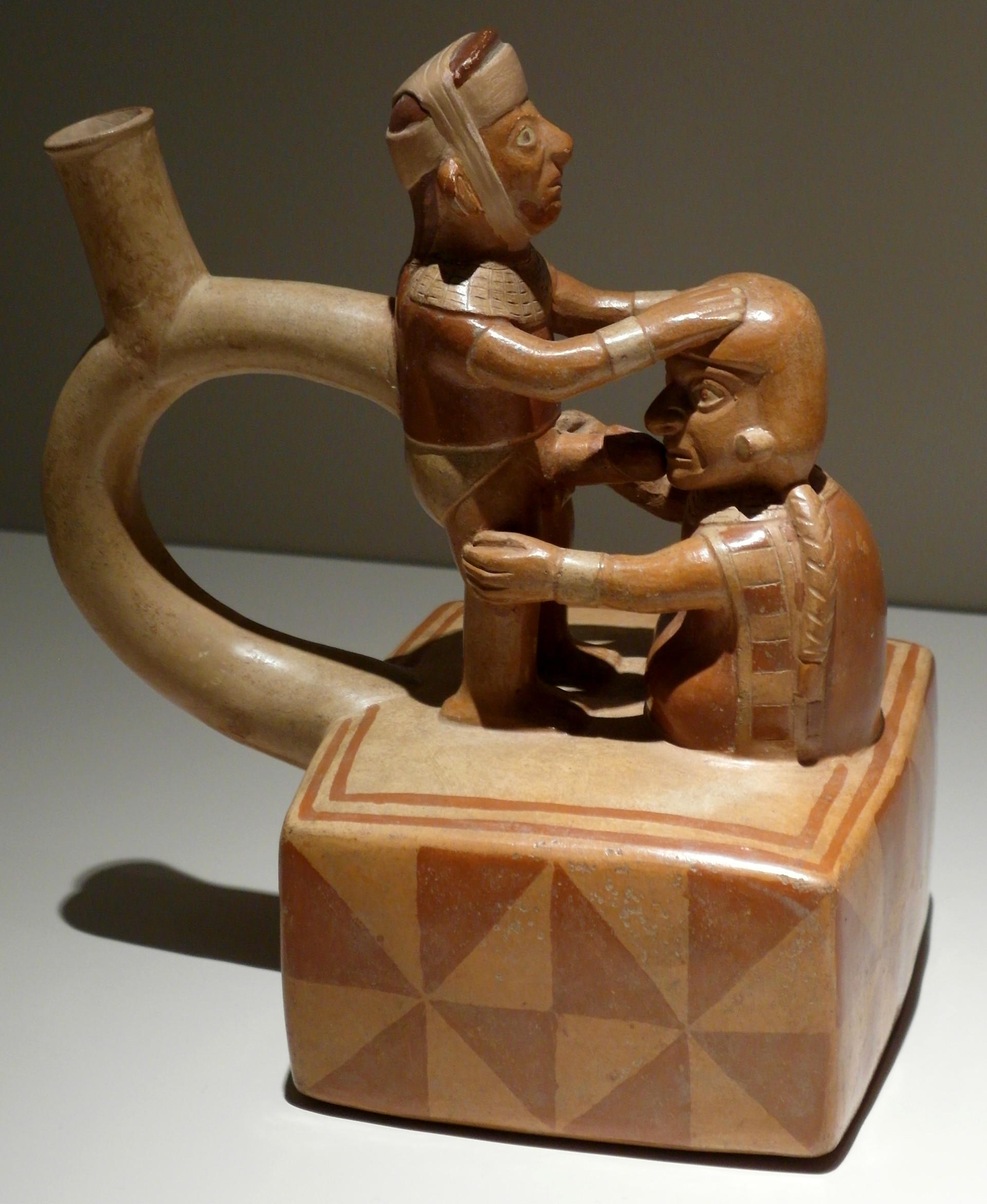
Oral sex between a male and a female. Ceramic vessel. Moche, Peru. Larco Museum, Lima 1 CE – 800 CE.

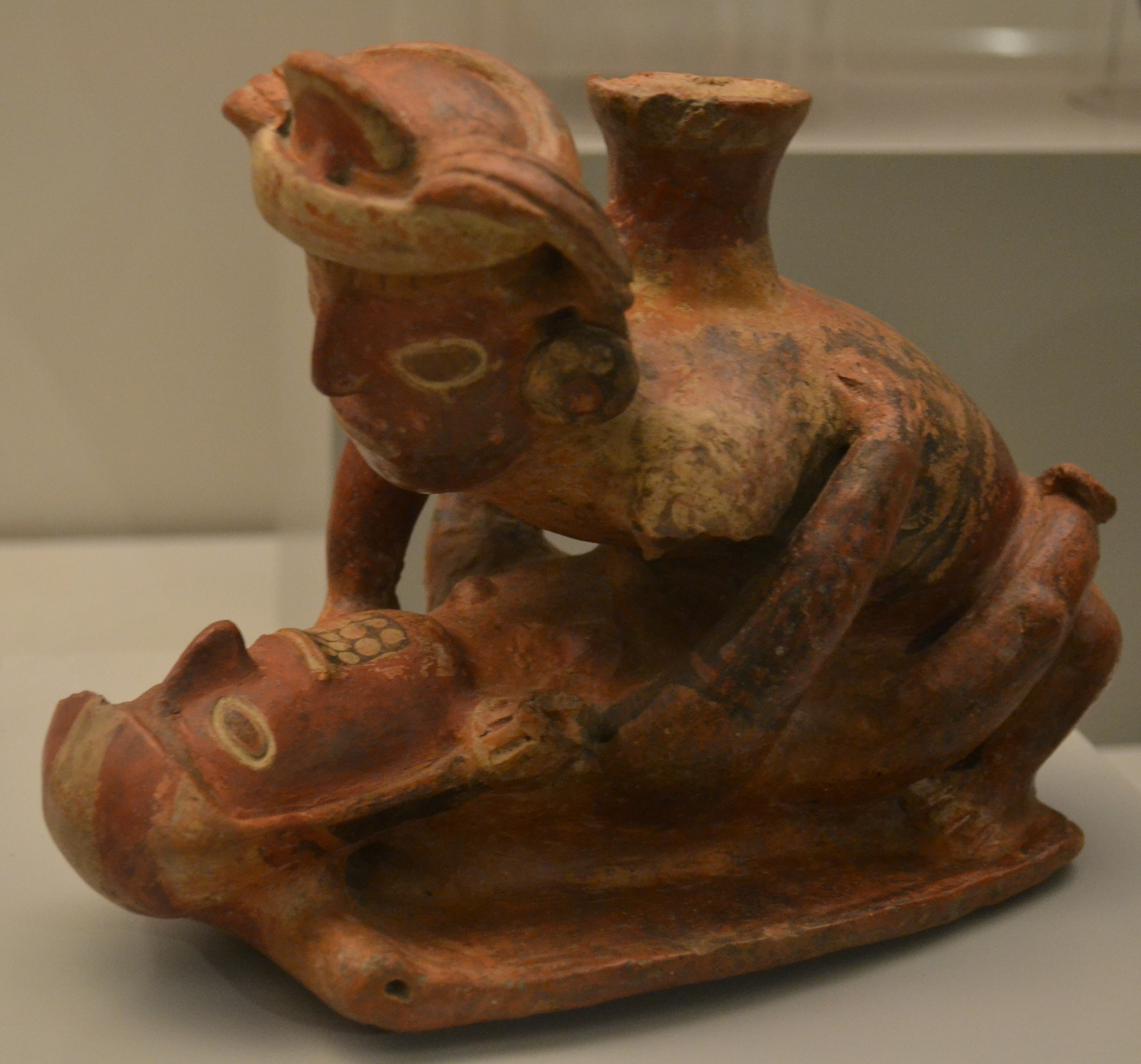
A Recuay painted vessel. Terracotta. Museum of America, Madrid, 400 BCE – 300 CE.

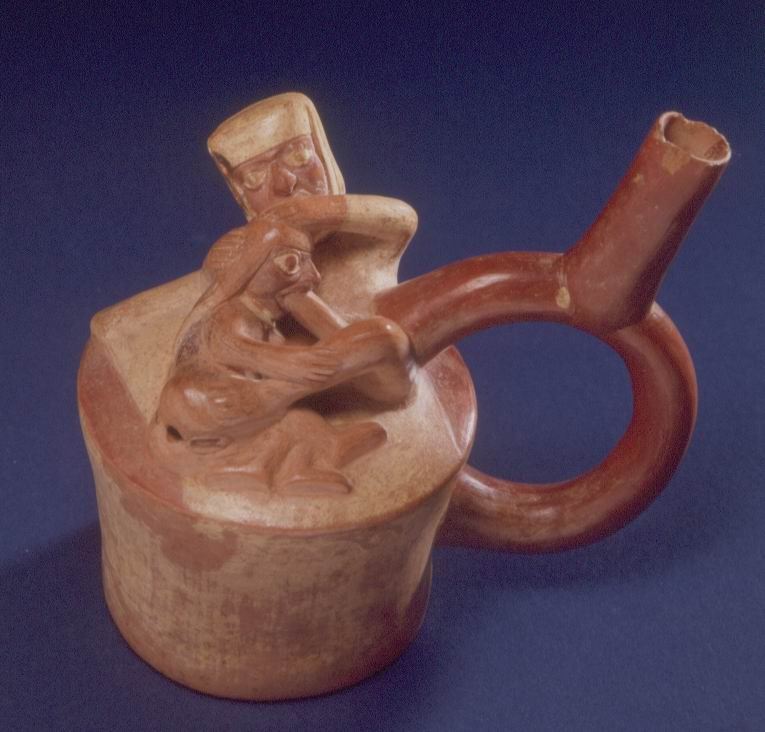
Ceramic vessel. Moche, Peru.
Larco Museum, Lima 300 CE.

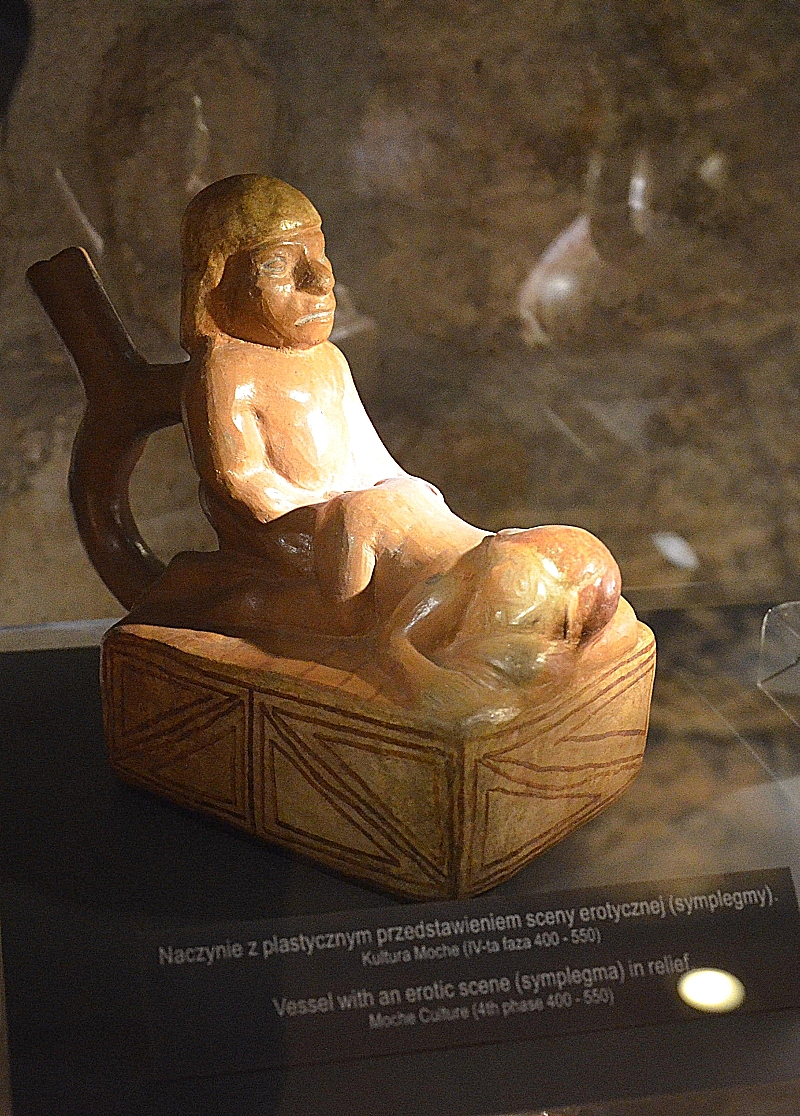
Ceramic vessel. Moche Culture, Peru. Archaeological Museum of Kraków, 400 CE – 550 CE.

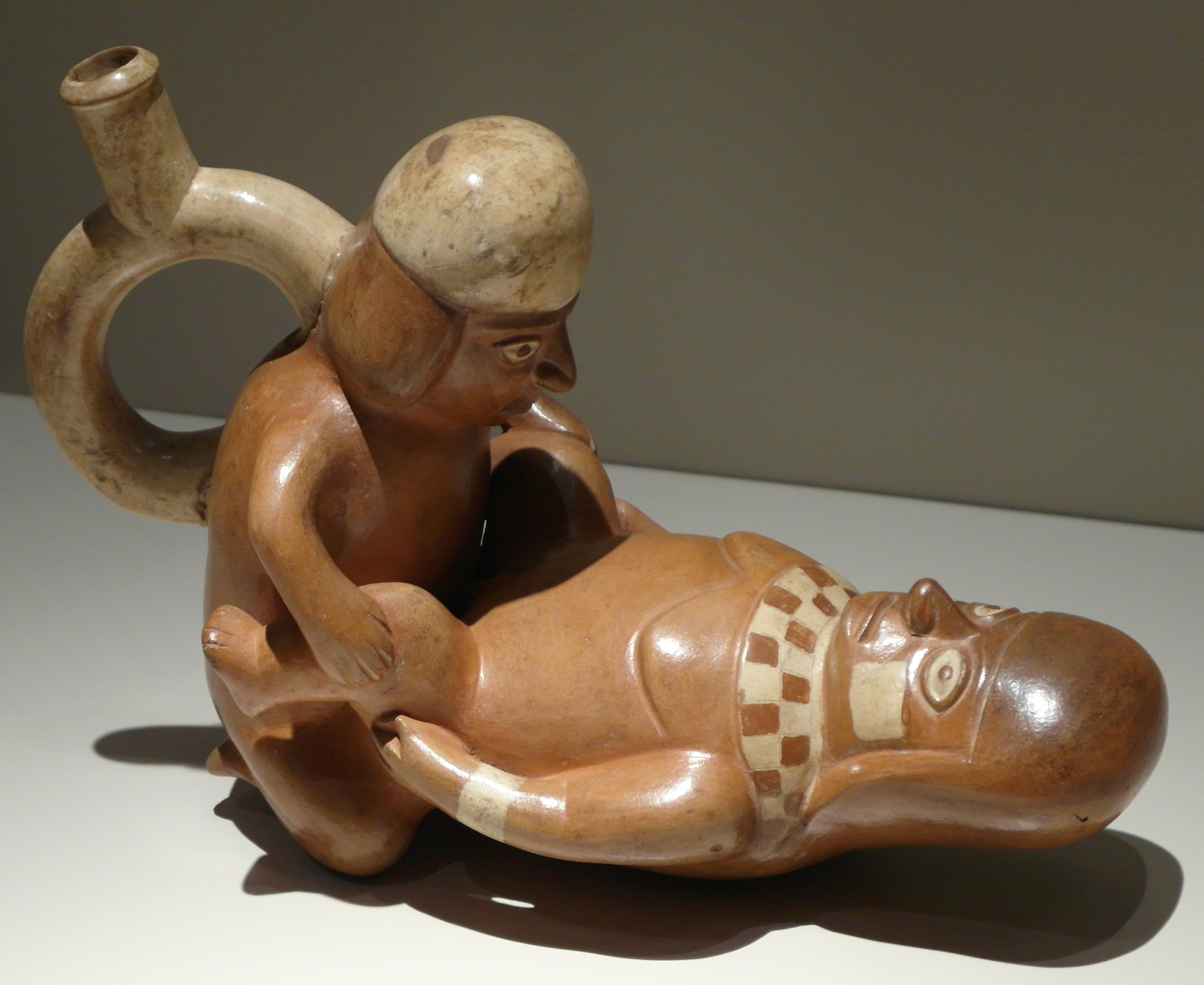
Ceramic vessel. Moche, Peru. Larco Museum, Lima, 1 CE – 800 CE.

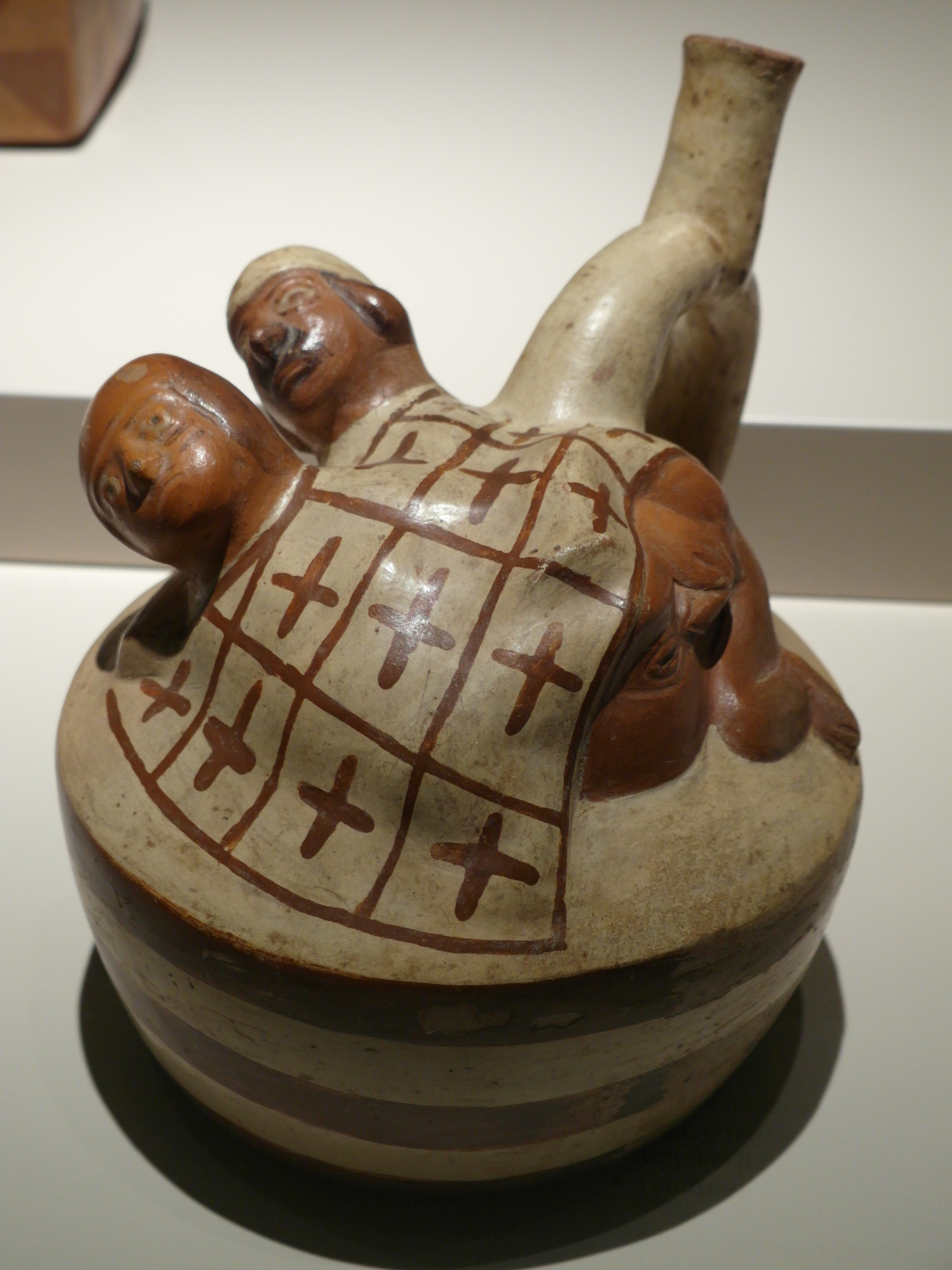
Ceramic vessel. Moche, Peru. Larco Museum, Lima, 1 CE – 800 CE.

=== India ===
India produced copious quantities of art celebrating the human faculty of love. The works depict love between men and women as well as same-sex love. One of the most famous ancient sex manuals was the Kama Sutra, written by Vātsyāyana in India during the first few centuries CE.

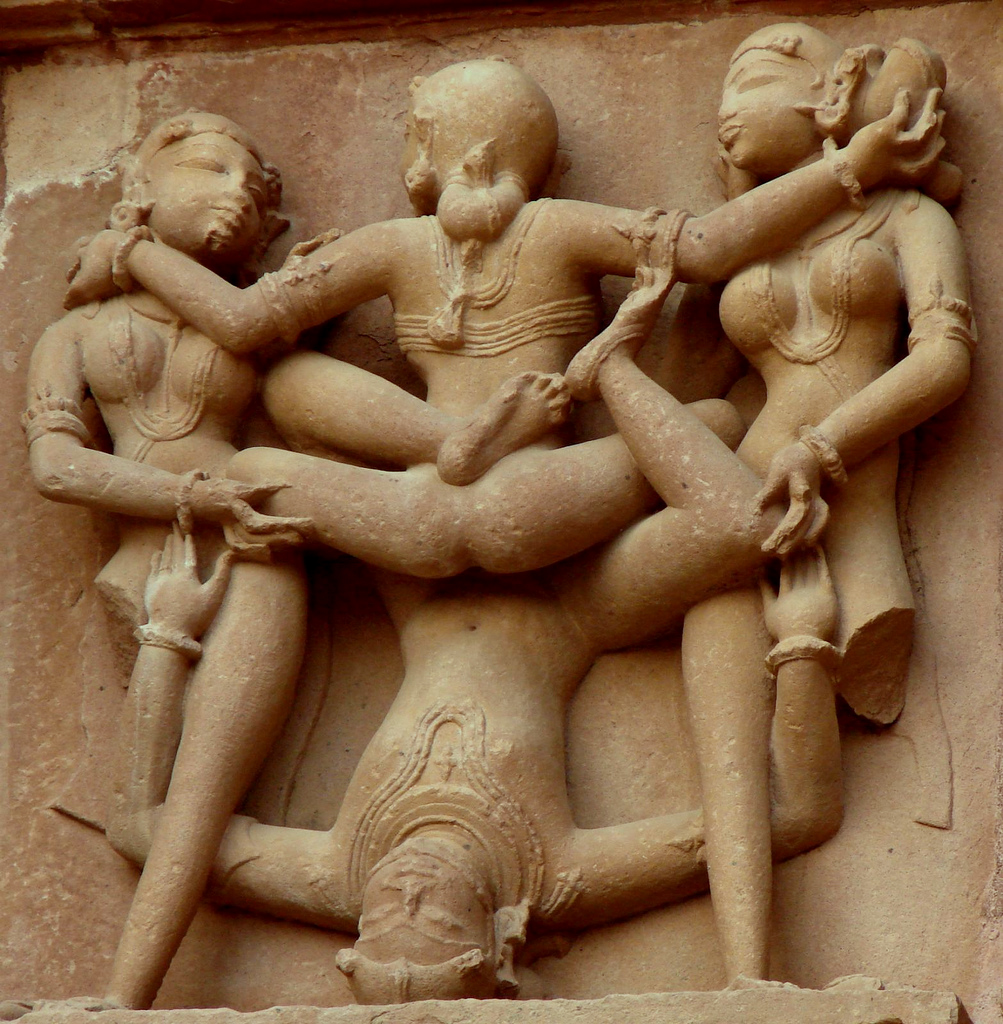
Erotic sculptures in Khajuraho

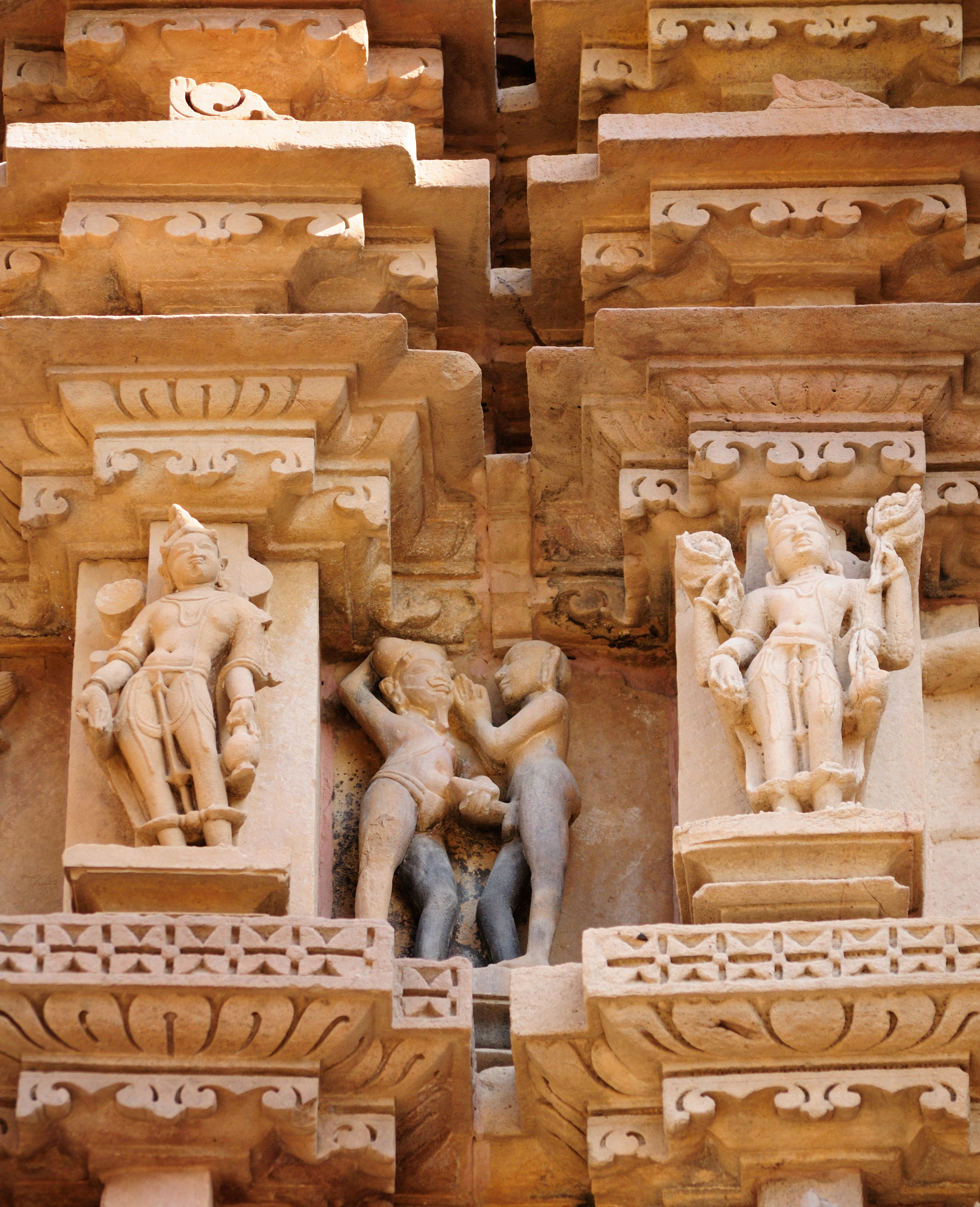
Erotic depiction of two men in Khajuraho

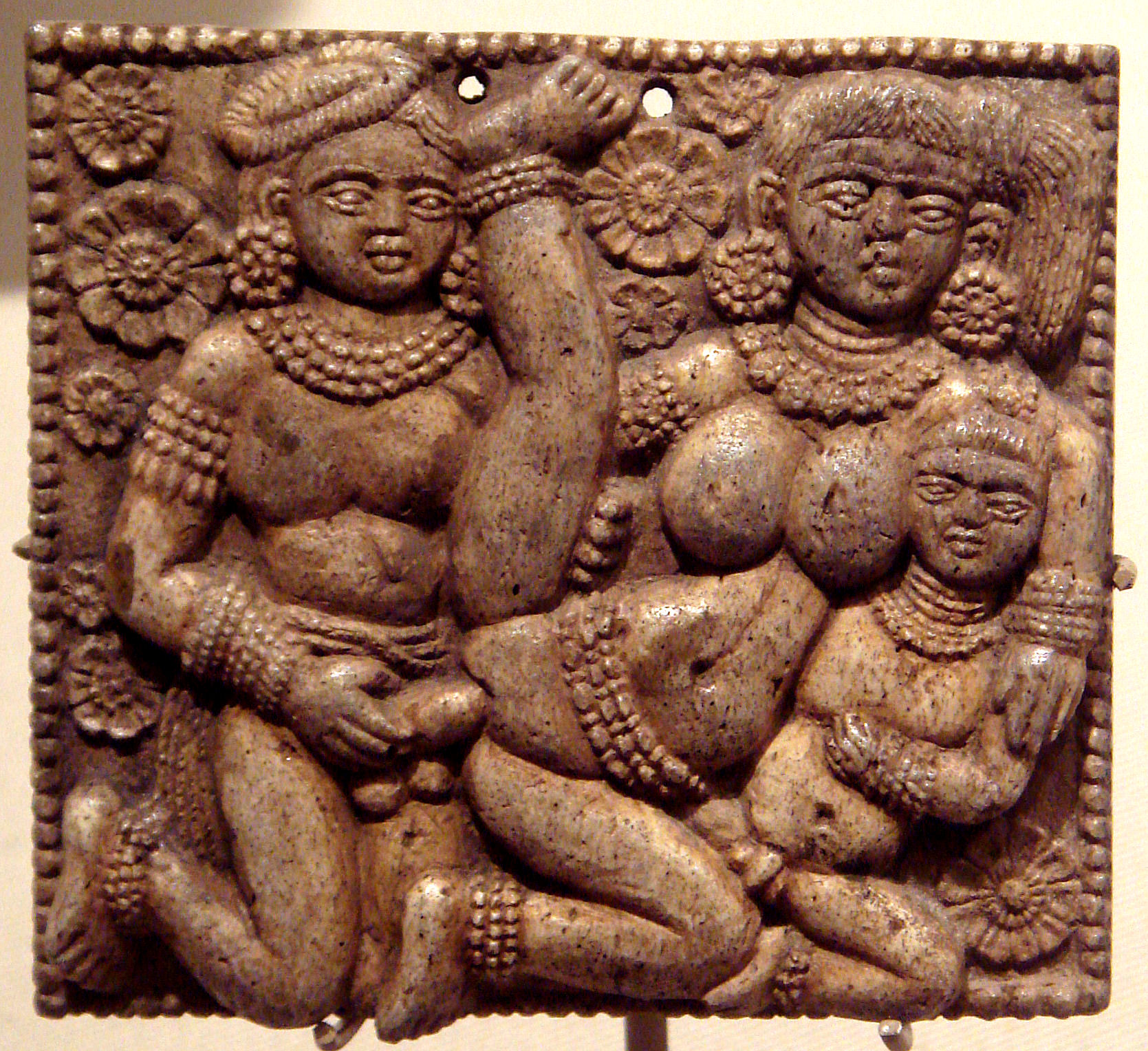
Shunga Empire sculpture (India), 1st century BCE. Metropolitan Museum of Art.

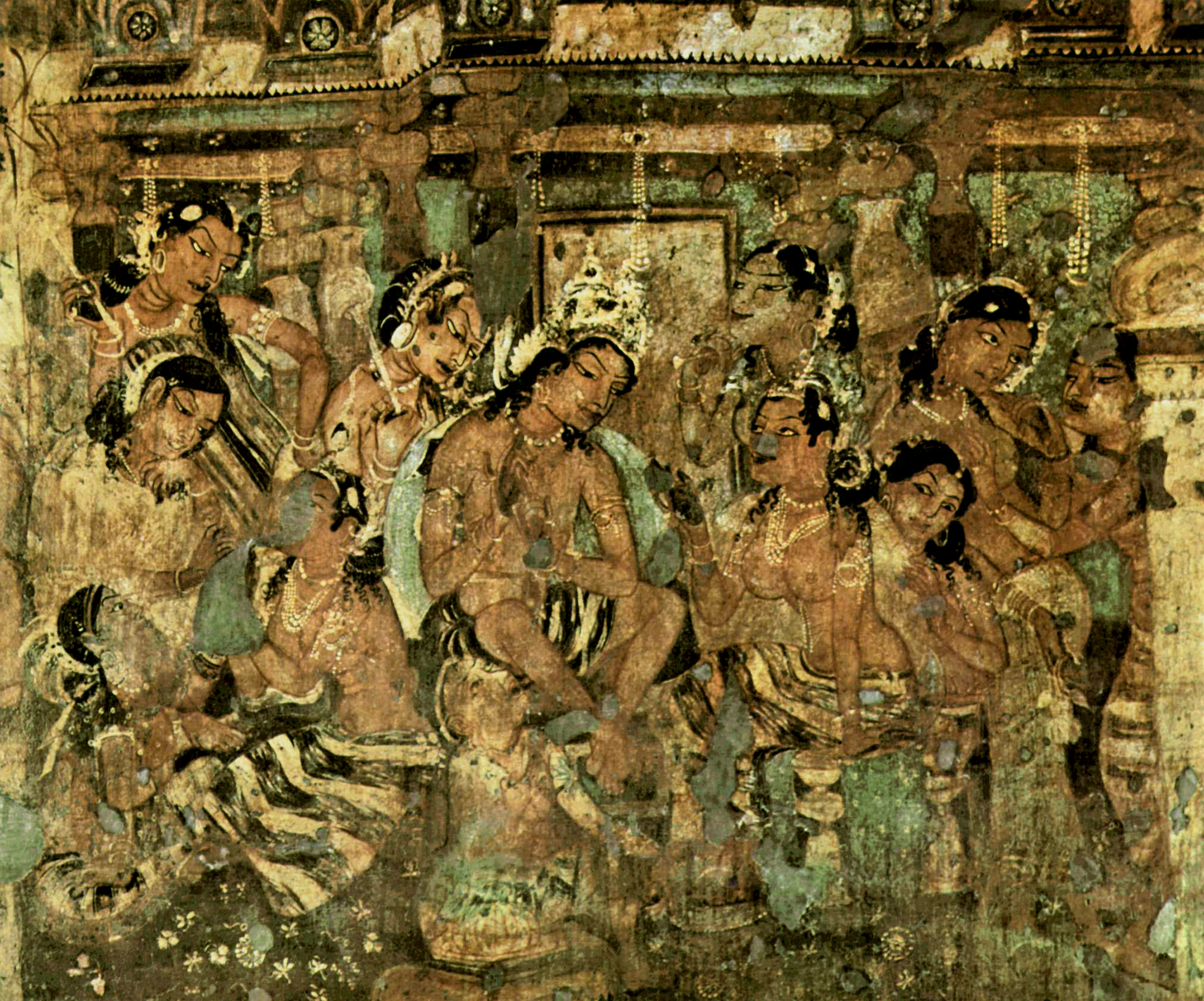
Fresco murals from the Ajanta caves, 6th–7th century CE

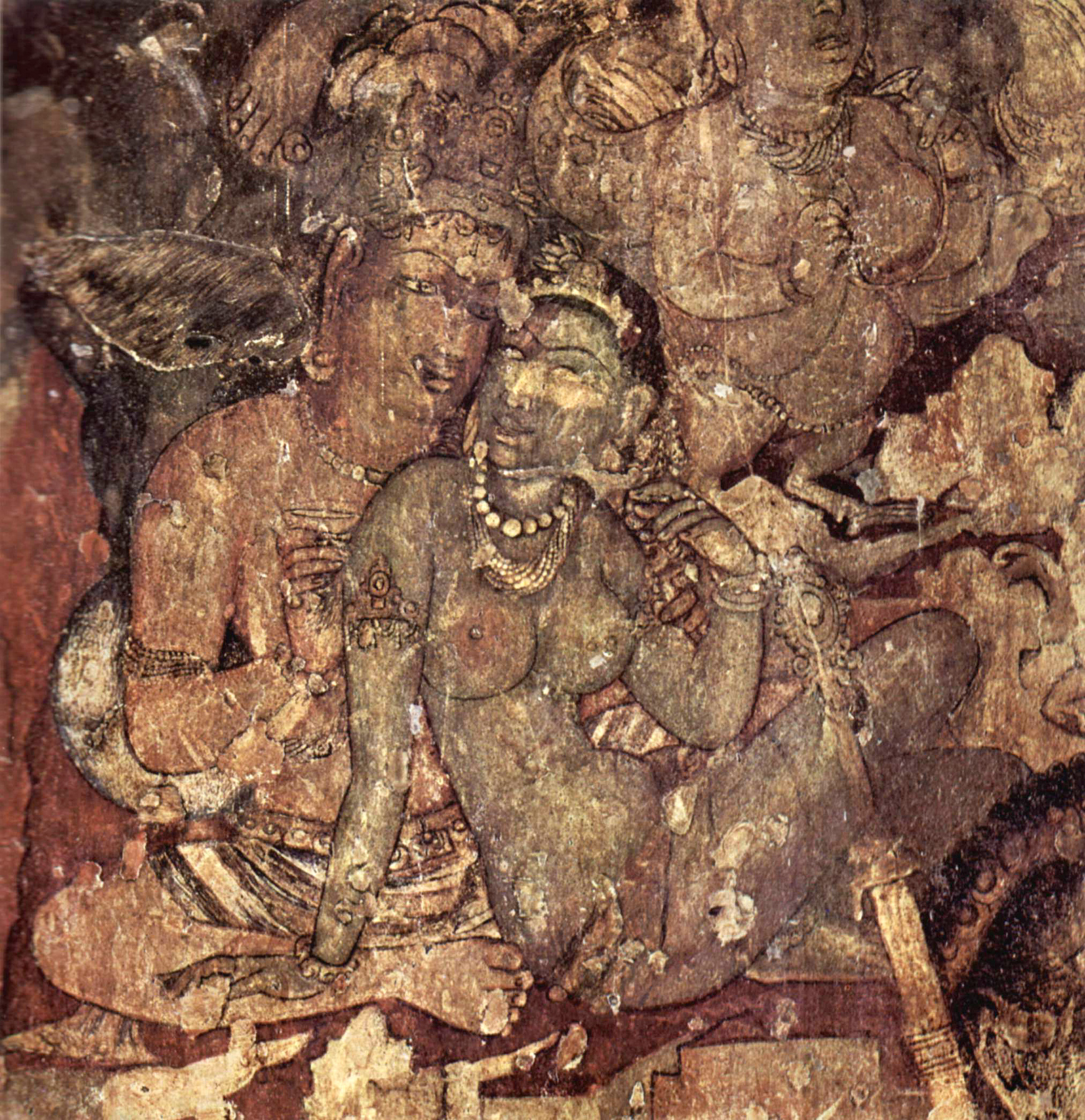
Fresco. Ajanta caves. 6th–7th century CE

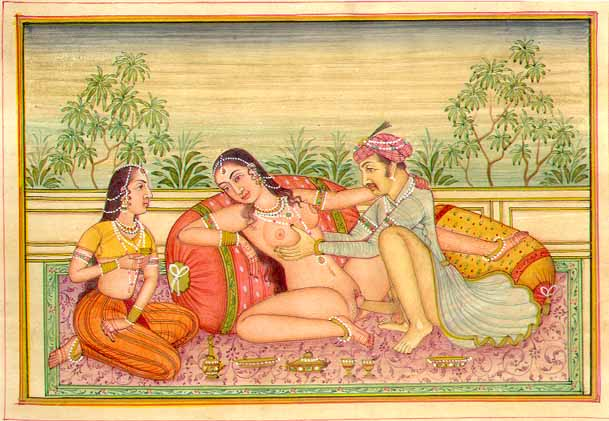
Illustration for the Kama Sutra, circa 19th Century CE

=== Sinosphere ===
In Japan, erotic art found its widest success in the medium of woodblock printing, in the style known as shunga (春画, 'spring pictures'), to which many classical woodblock artists, such as Suzuki Harunobu and Kitagawa Utamaro, contributed a large number of works. Erotic painted hand scrolls were also very popular. Shunga appeared in the 13th century, and continued to grow in popularity, despite occasionally attempts by the authorities to clamp down on their production, the first instance of which being a ban on erotic books known as kōshokubon (好色本) issued by the Tokugawa shogunate in Kyōhō 7 (1722). Shunga only ceased to be produced in the 19th century, following the invention and wider spread of photography, which mainly usurped the medium.

In Korea, chunhwa (Korean: 춘화; Hanja: 春畵) became prevalent during the Joseon era. Although the era was known to be conservative about the relationship between men and women, the introduction and spread of commerce allowed erotic arts to be made by artists.

The Chinese tradition of erotic art was also extensive, with examples dating back as far as the Yuan dynasty (1271–1368). The erotic art of China reached its peak during the latter part of the Ming dynasty (1368–1644).

In both China and Japan, eroticism played a prominent role in the development of the novel. The Tale of Genji, sometimes considered the world's first novel, was produced in the 11th century by Heian period noblewoman Murasaki Shikibu, and featured the depiction of many erotic affairs by its protagonist. The more explicit 16th century Chinese novel The Plum in the Golden Vase, often called one of the Four Great Classical Novels of Chinese literature, was in contrast suppressed as pornography for much of its history, where The Tale of Genji was celebrated from its inception.

Show large gallery
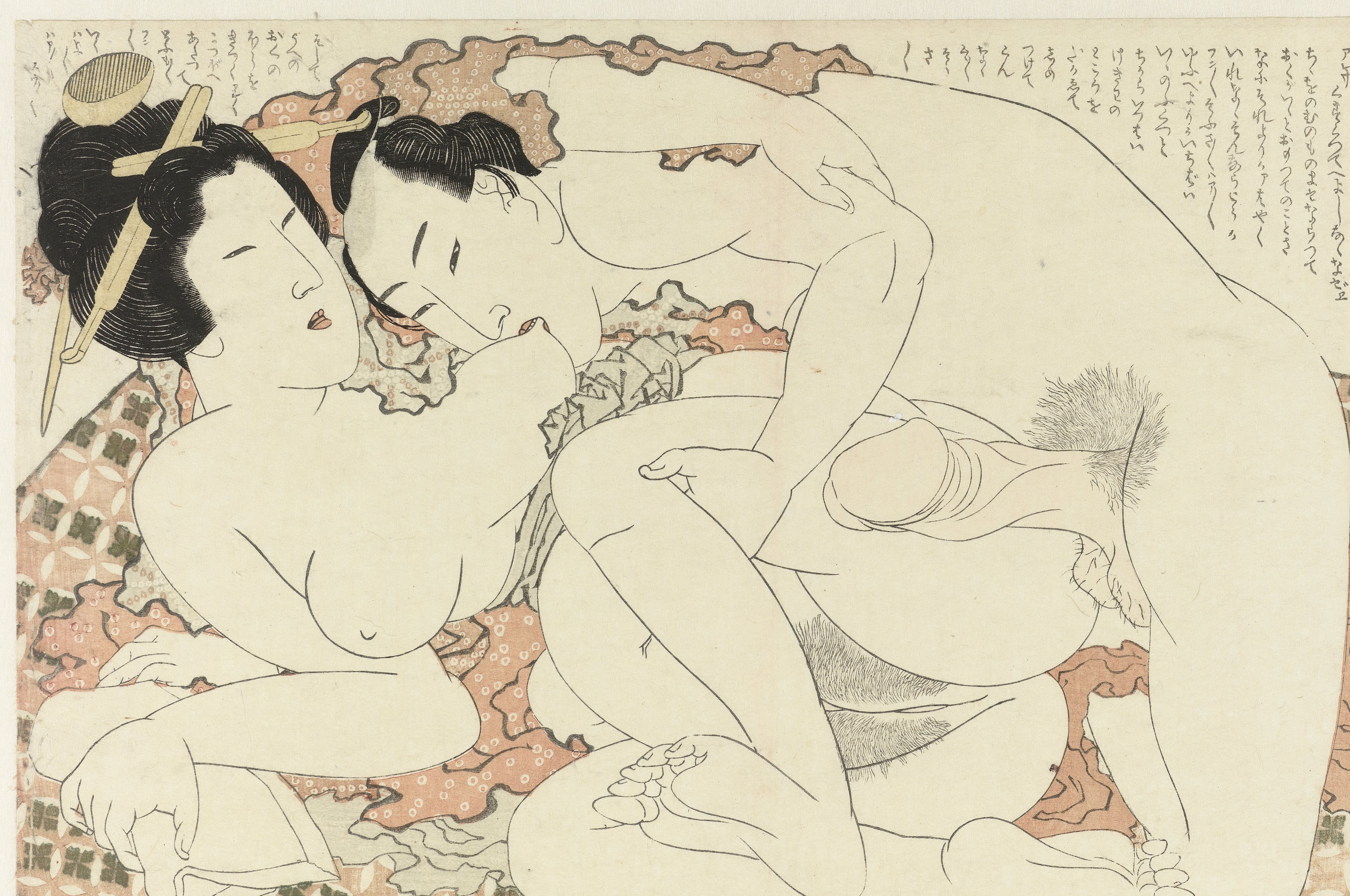
Shunga depicting a man sucking a woman's breasts. Japan 1815–1823.

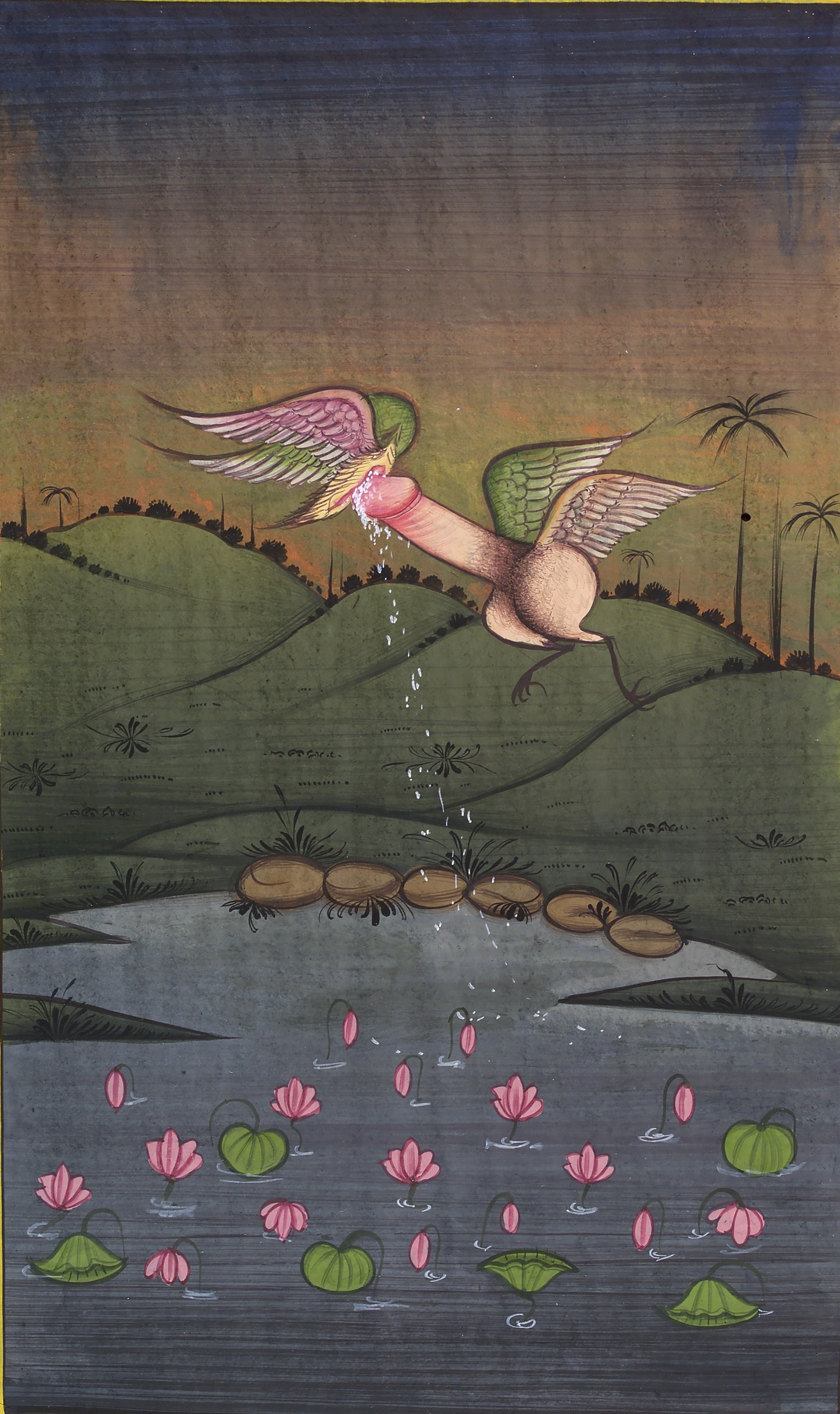
Gouache painting. 1900–1999

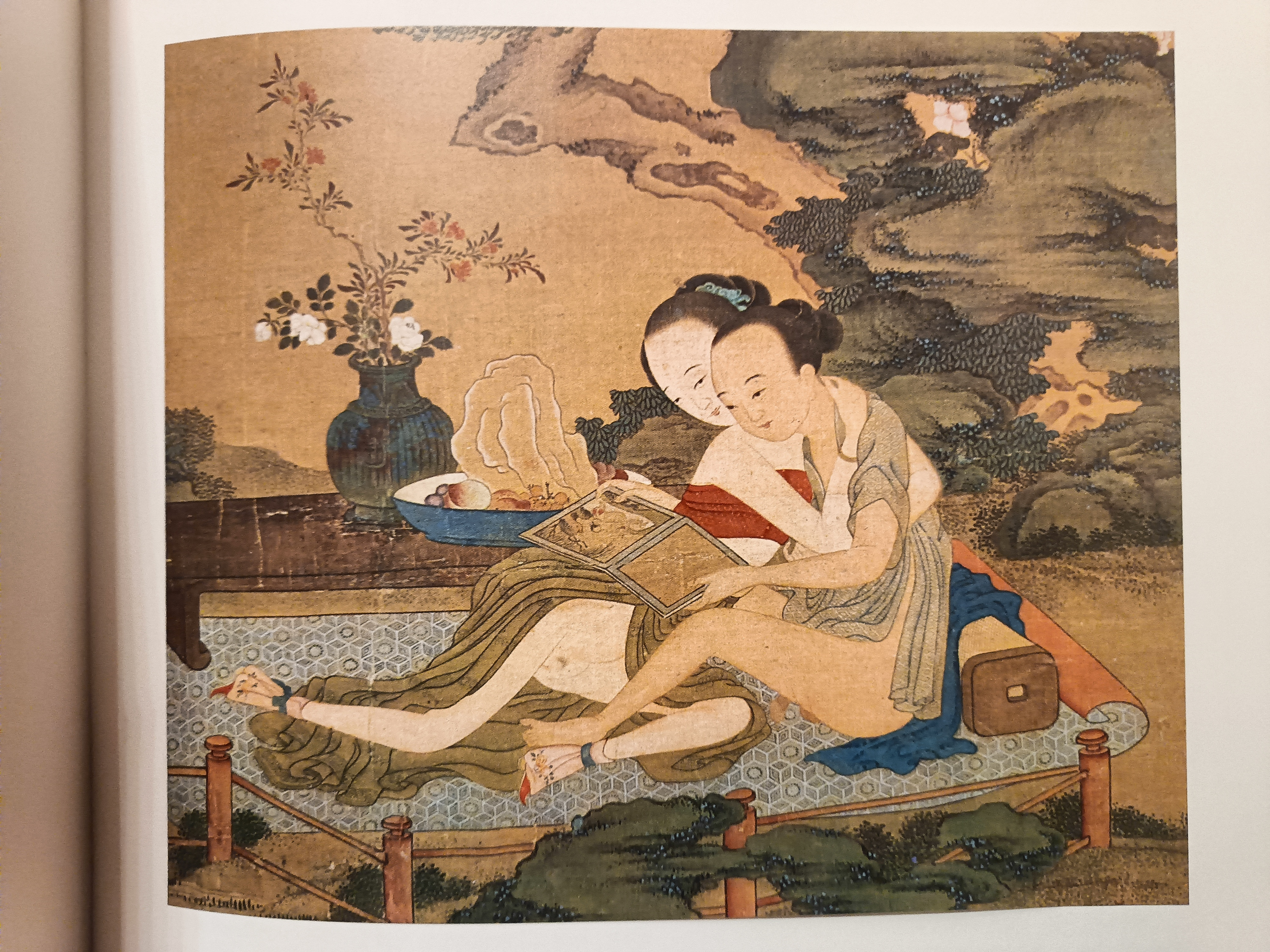
Paintings of sex on an erotic album being viewed. Painting on silk. Thought to be late 17th century.

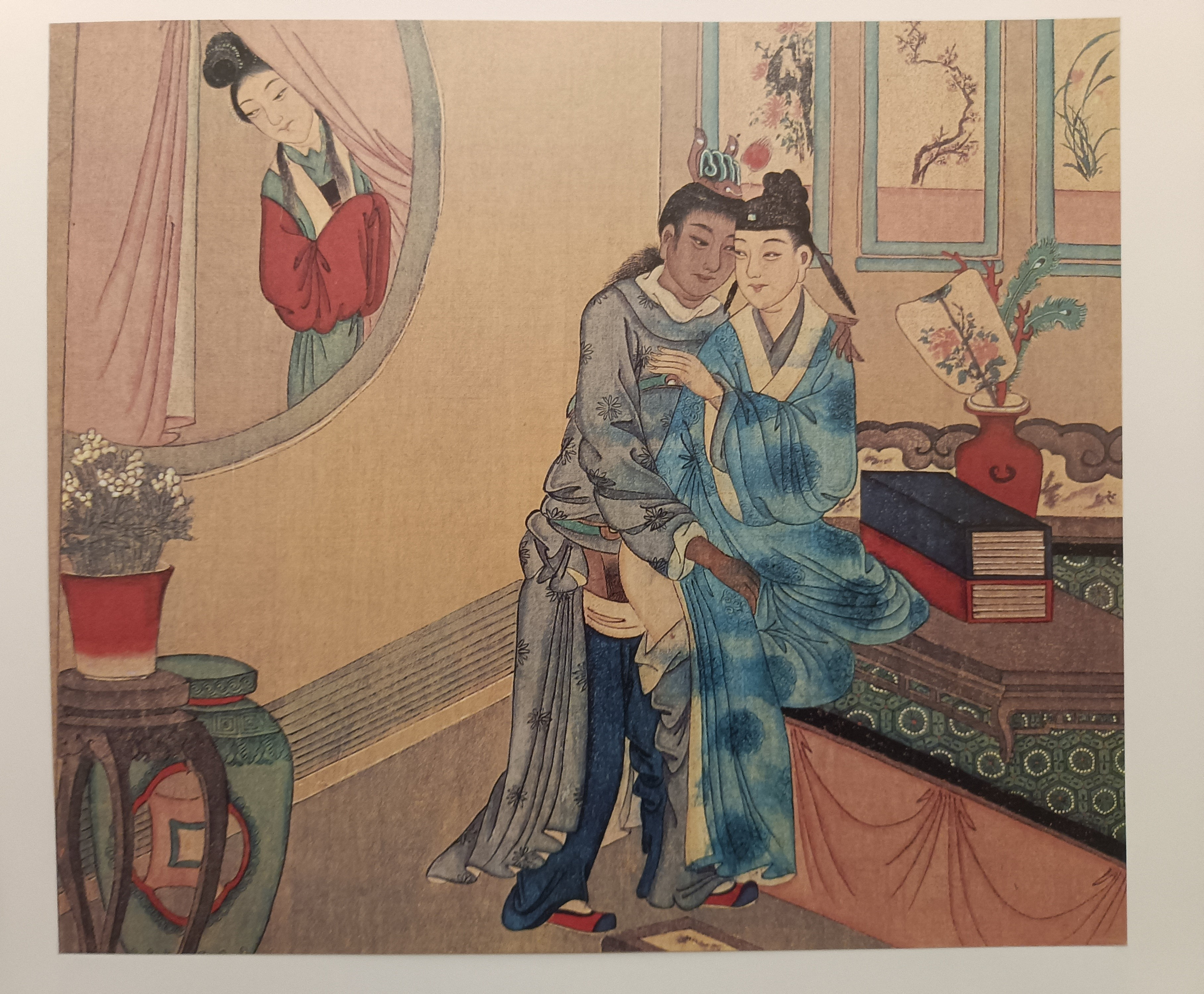
Anal sex between two males being viewed. Painting. Qing-dynasty. 18th Century

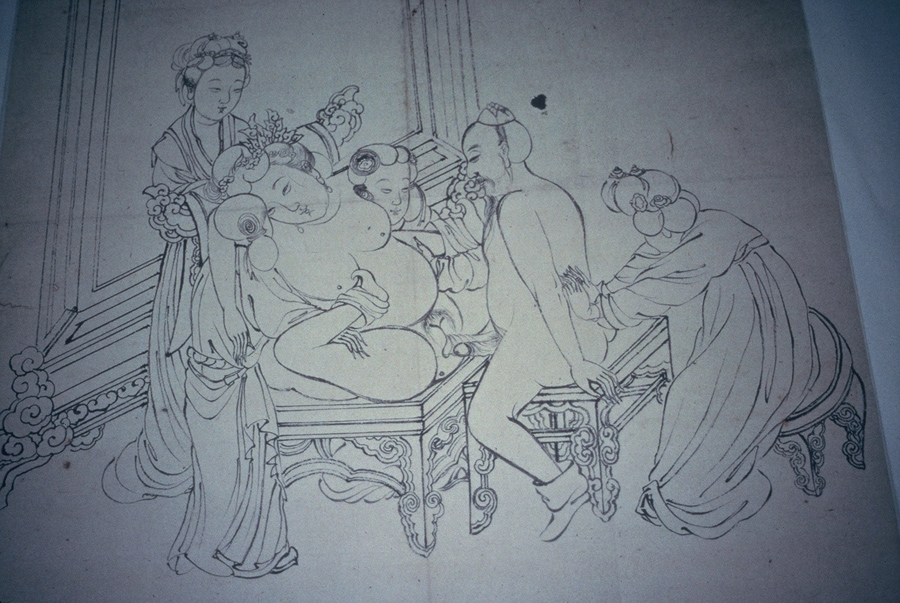
It is thought that this image is a sketch of a painting. The painting is thought to have been created in the pre-Song period. Prior to 960 CE. This sketch thought to have been created in the early to mid 19th century.

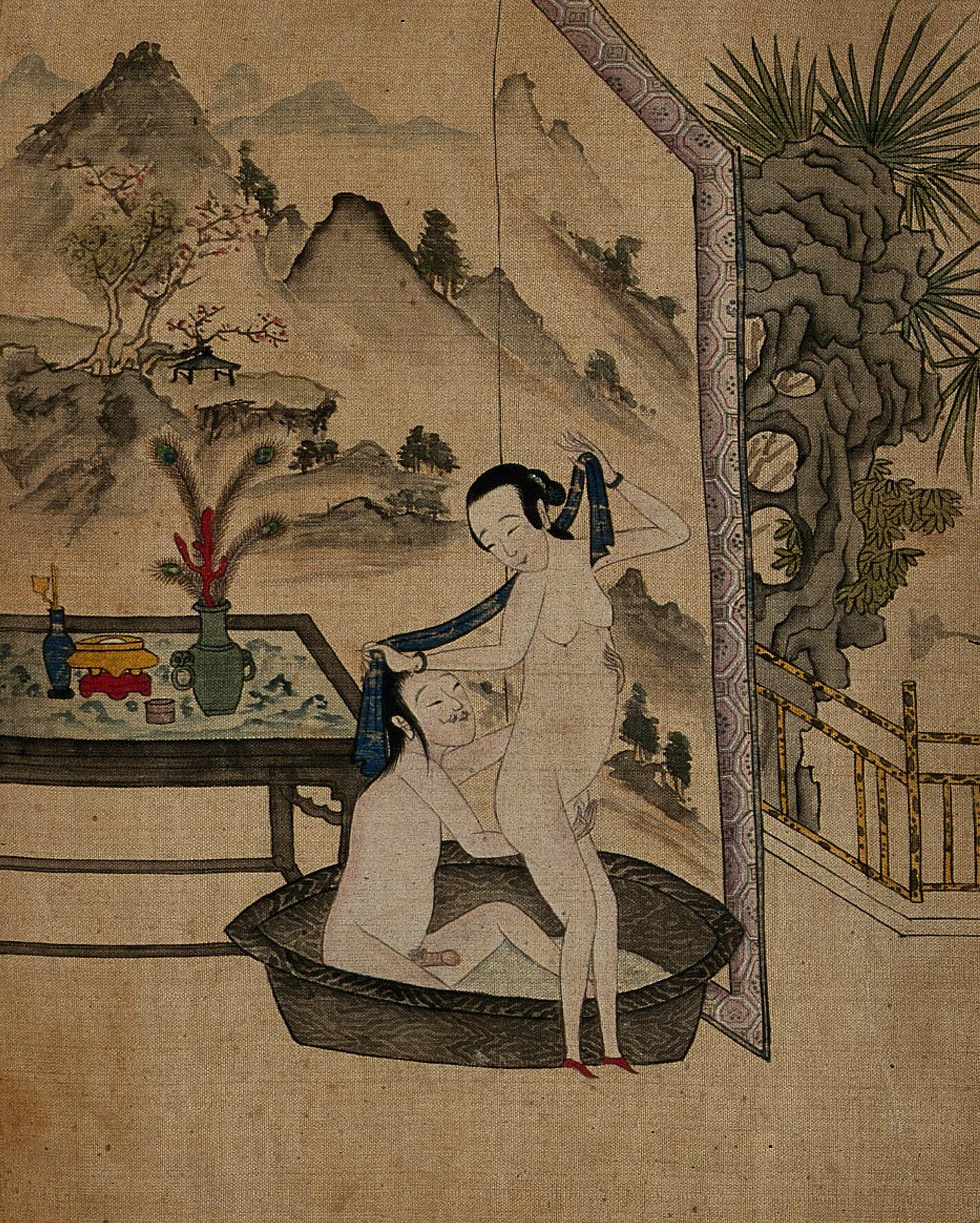
Vaginal fingering. Gouache painting on cloth, between 1800 and 1899.

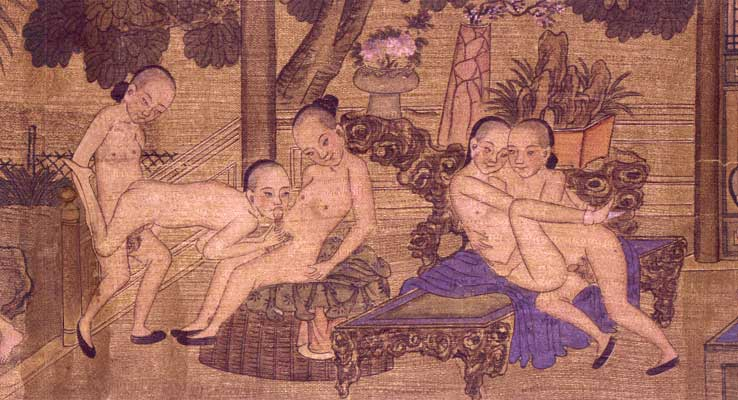
Young males engaged in erotic play. Hand scroll, opaque watercolor on paper. Beijing, Qing dynasty, late 19th century.

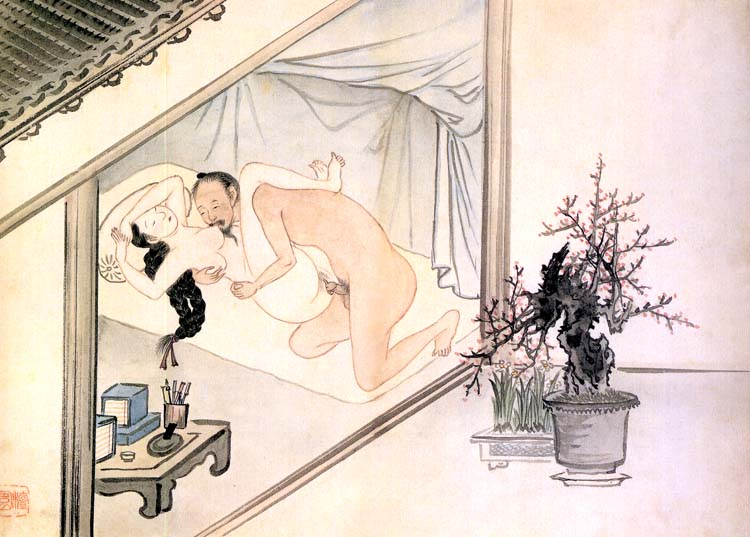
An example of Korean chunwha, painted by Kim Hong-do

=== Middle East ===
The Umayyad caliph Al-Walid II, who ruled the Arab Islamic empire in the 8th century, was a great patron of erotic art. Among the depictions of the Qusayr Amra, which were built by him, is the abundance of naked females and love scenes.

The Perfumed Garden of Sensual Delight (Arabic: الروض العاطر في نزهة الخاطر) is a fifteenth-century Arabic sex manual and work of erotic literature by Muhammad ibn Muhammad al-Nefzawi, also known simply as "Nefzawi". The book presents opinions on what qualities men and women should have to be attractive and gives advice on sexual technique, warnings about sexual health, and recipes to remedy sexual maladies. It gives lists of names for the penis and vulva, and has a section on the interpretation of dreams. Interspersed with these there are a number of stories which are intended to give context and amusement.

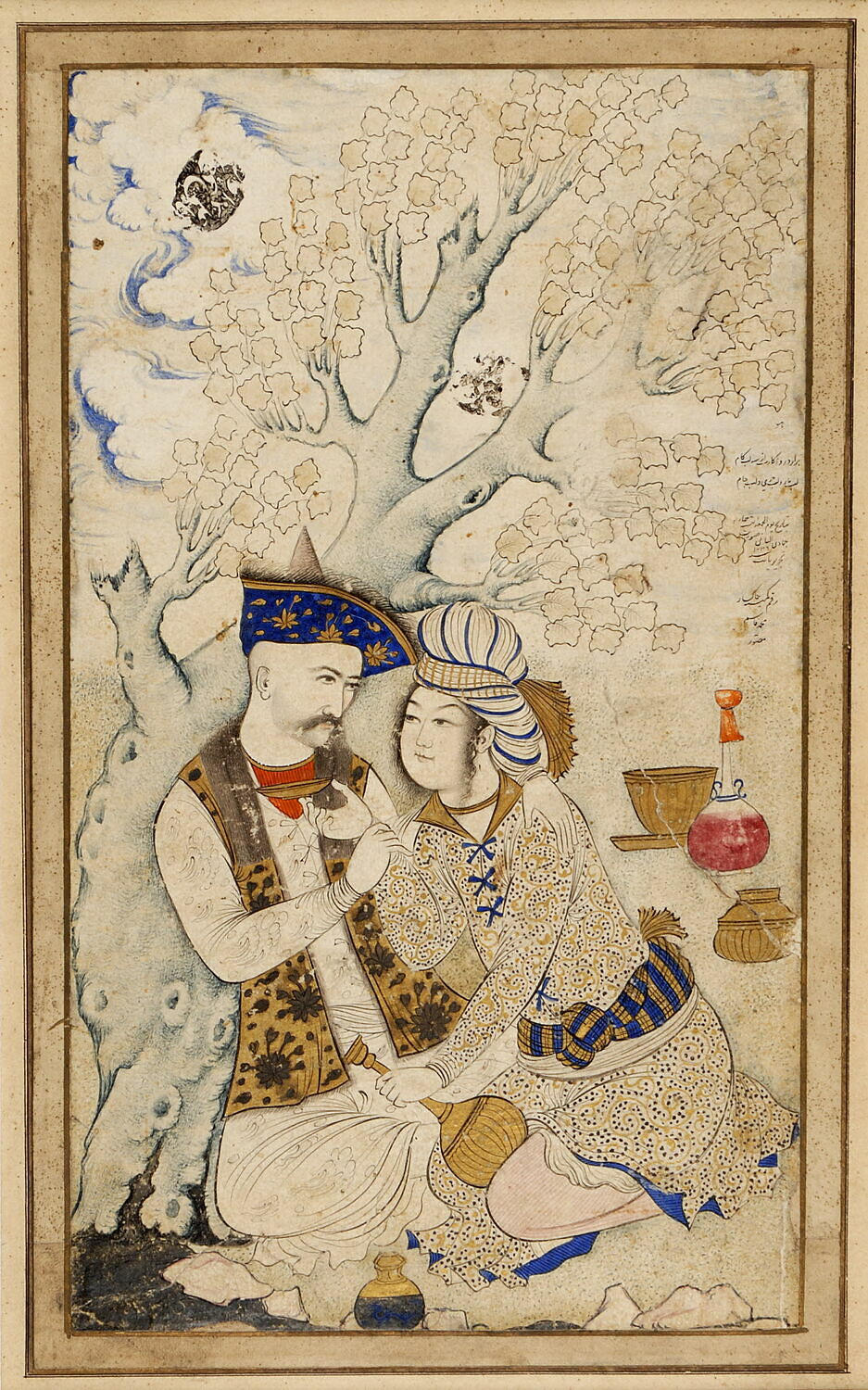
Abbas the Great and a page boy embracing. By Muhammad Qasim, 1627, Safavid Iran. Louvre, Paris.

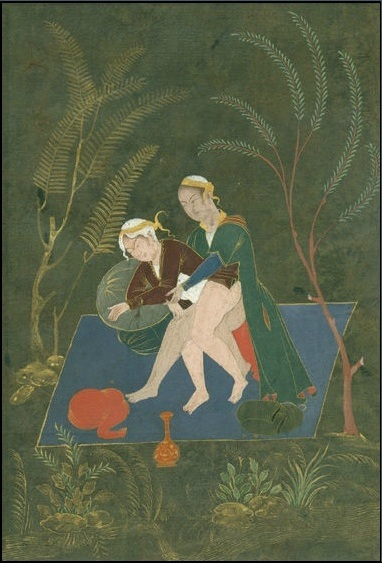
Anal sex between two males. Watercolour on paper. Around 1660 – 1720, Safavid Iran.

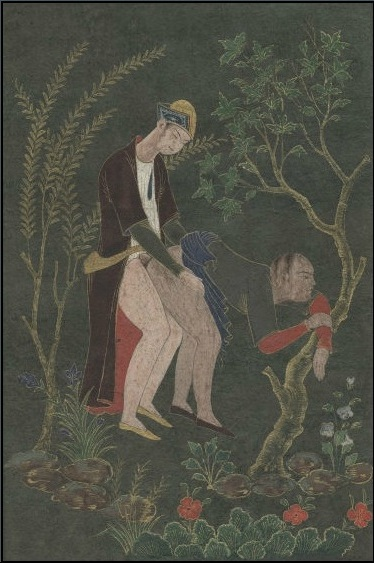
Anal sex between two males. Watercolour on paper. Around 1660 – 1720, Safavid Iran.

=== European ===
Erotic scenes in medieval illuminated manuscripts also appeared, but were seen only by those who could afford the extremely expensive hand-made books. Most of these drawings occur in the margins of books of hours. Many medieval scholars think that the pictures satisfied the medieval cravings for both erotic pictures and religion in one book, especially since it was often the only book someone owned. Other scholars think the drawings in the margins were a kind of moral caution, but the depiction of priests and other ranking officials engaged in sex acts suggests political origins as well.

It was not until the invention of the printing press by Johannes Gutenberg that sexually explicit images entered into any type of mass circulation in the western world. Before that time, erotic images, being hand made and expensive, were limited to upper class males. In Regency England, for example, Thomas Rowlandson produced a body of highly explicit erotica for a private clientele. Even the British Museum had a Secretum filled with a collection of ancient erotica donated by the upper class doctor George Witt in 1865. The remains of the collection, including his scrapbooks, still reside in Cupboard 55, though the majority of it has recently been integrated with the museum's other collections.

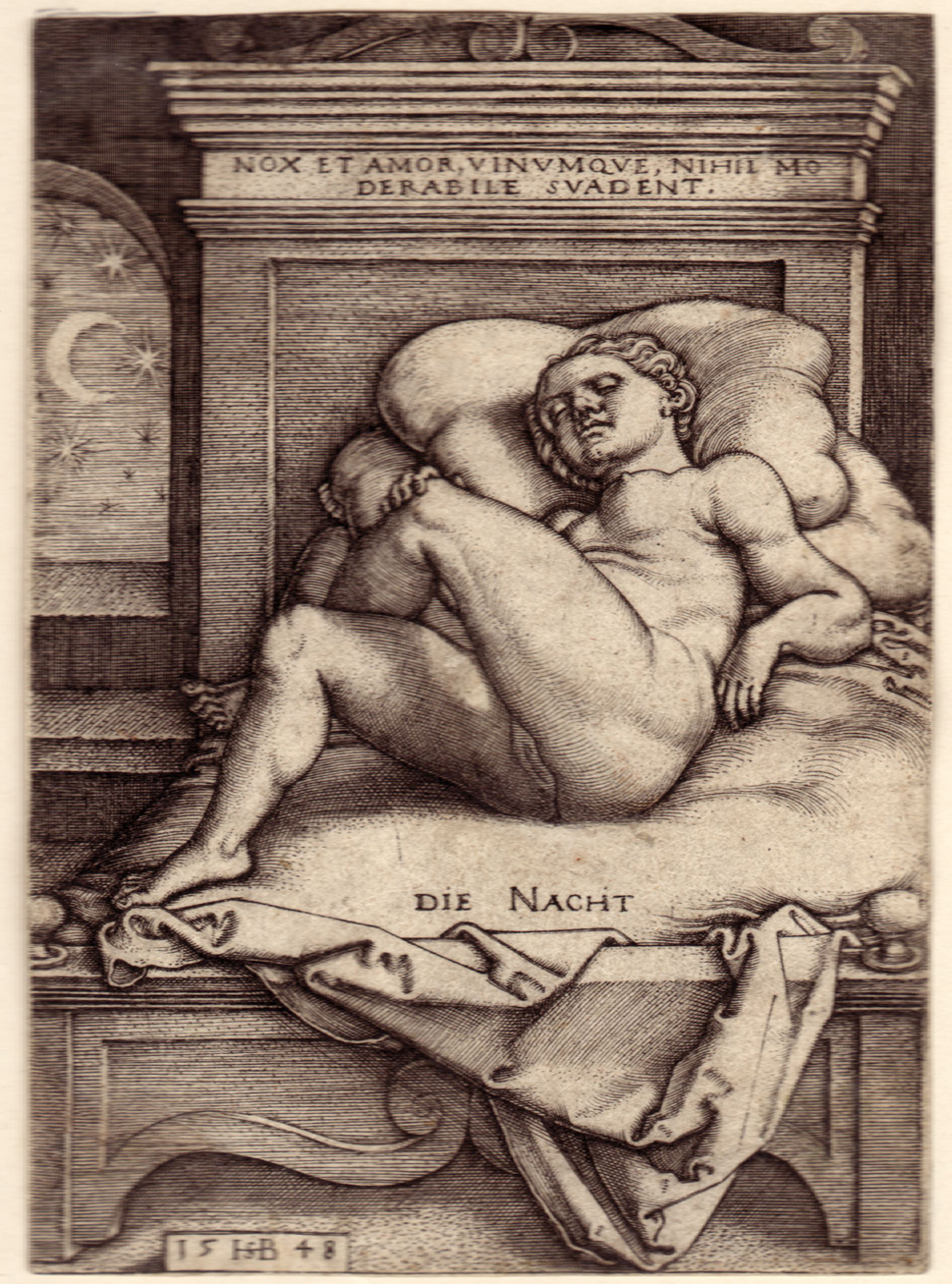
Die Nacht - Night by Sebald Beham. Engraving. (1548), 108 x 78 mm

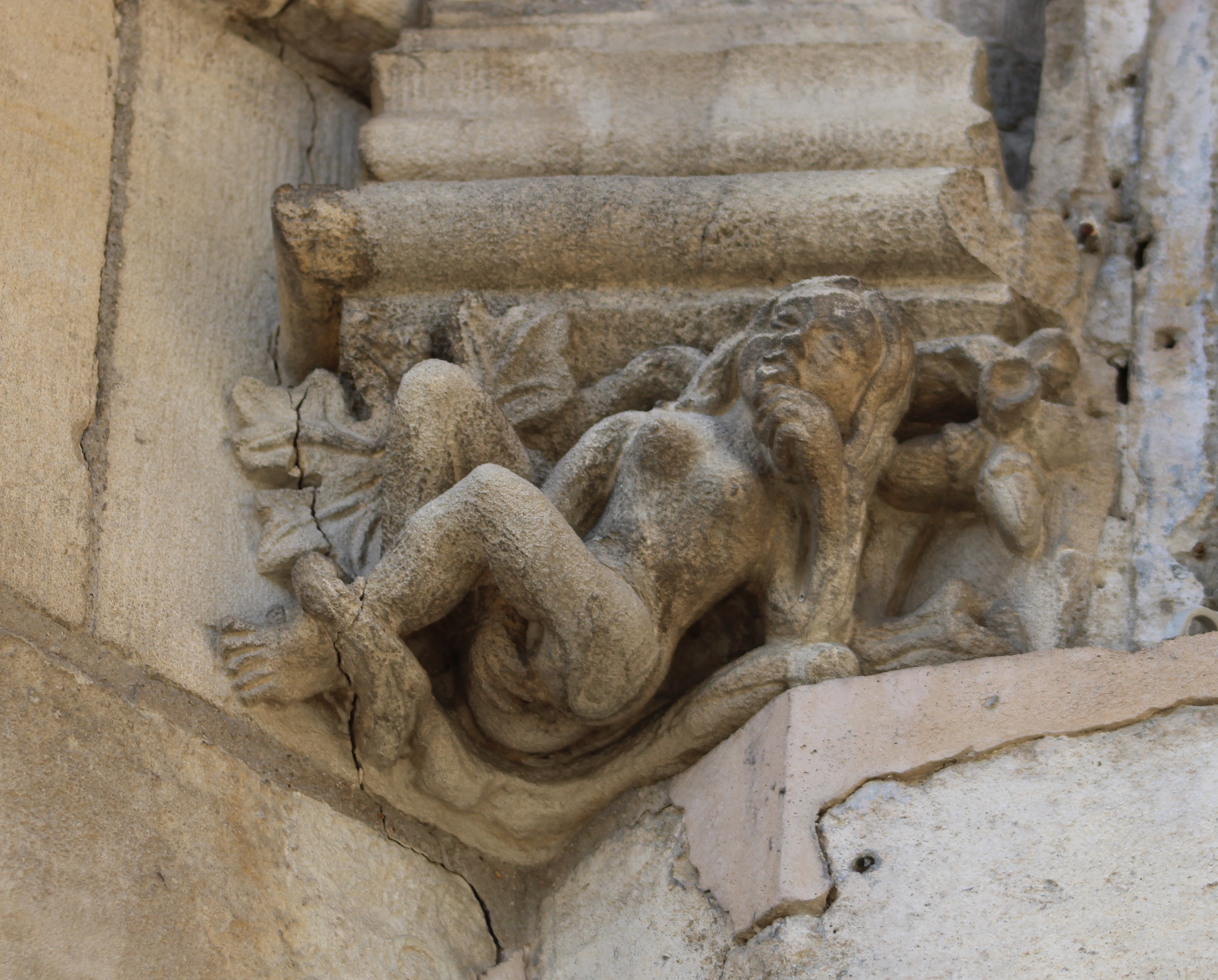
Masturbation. Hôtel-de-Ville de Saint-Quentin. Saint-Quentin, France. Between 1331 and 1509.

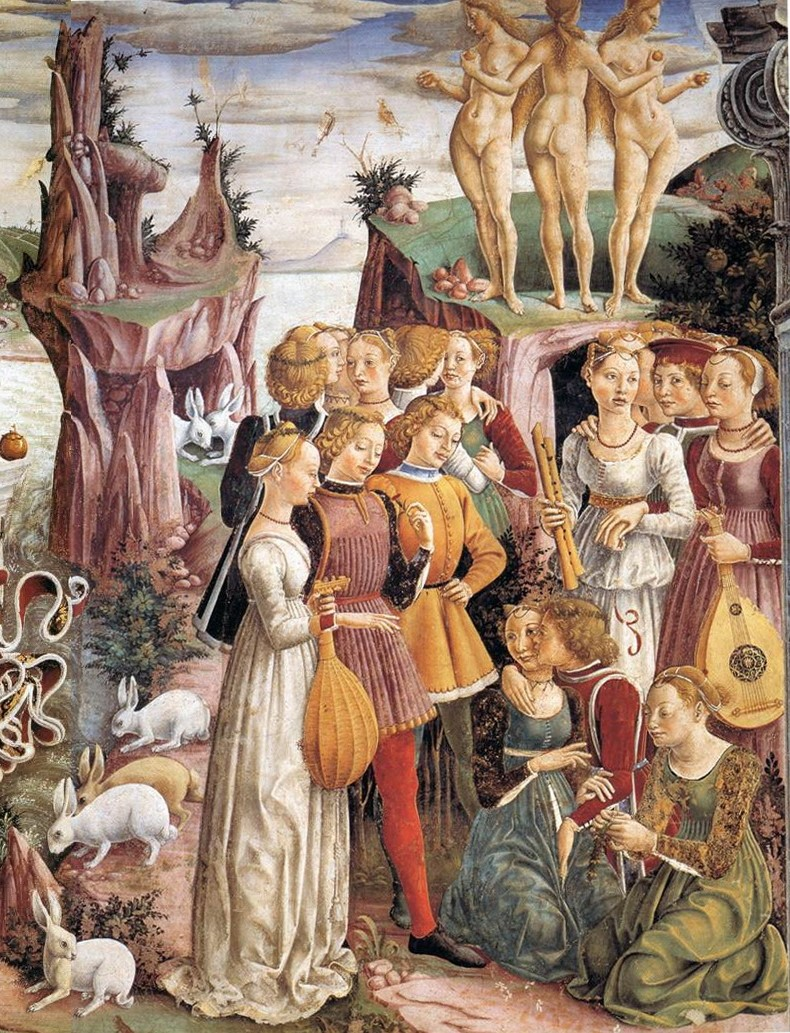
Allegory of April. Francesco del Cossa, Ercole de’ Roberti and Gherardo di Andrea Fiorini. Fresco in the Schifanoia Palace, Ferrara. Around 1469

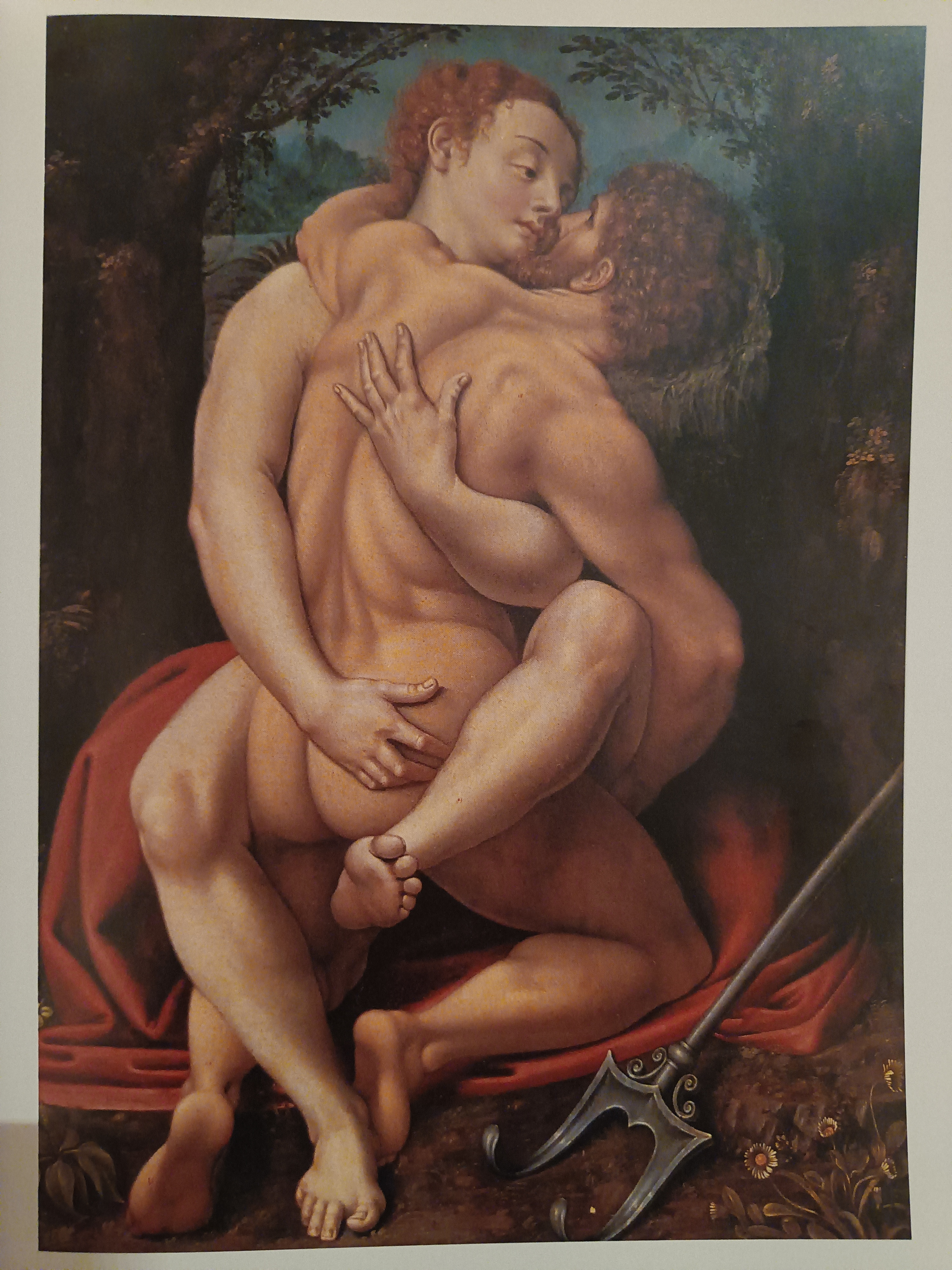
"Neptune and Nymph". Bernard van Orley. Private collection. Date: First third of the 16th century.

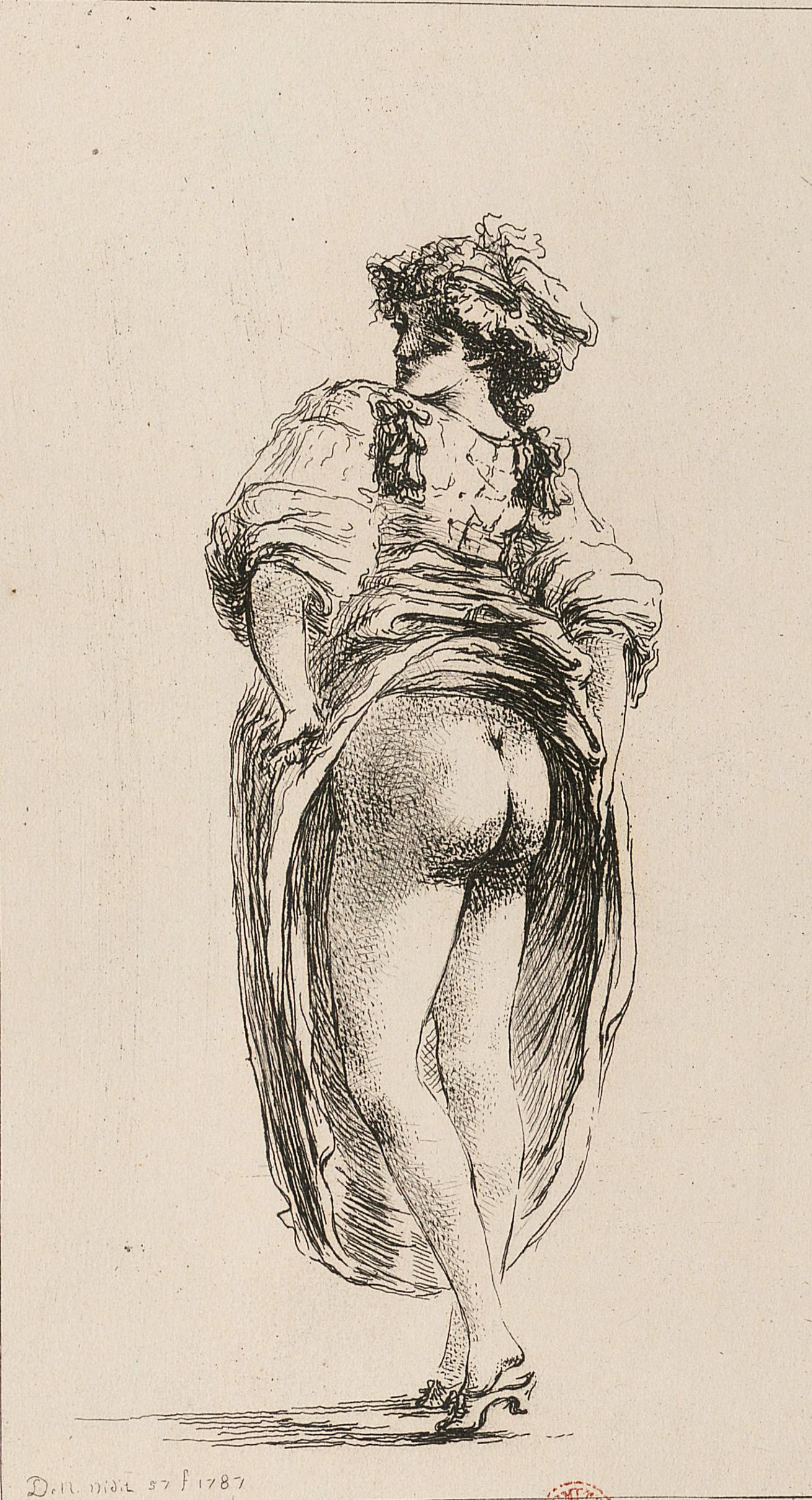
Beautiful Neapolitan woman seen from behind. Engraving from Dominique Vivant Denon's Oeuvre Priapique. 1787

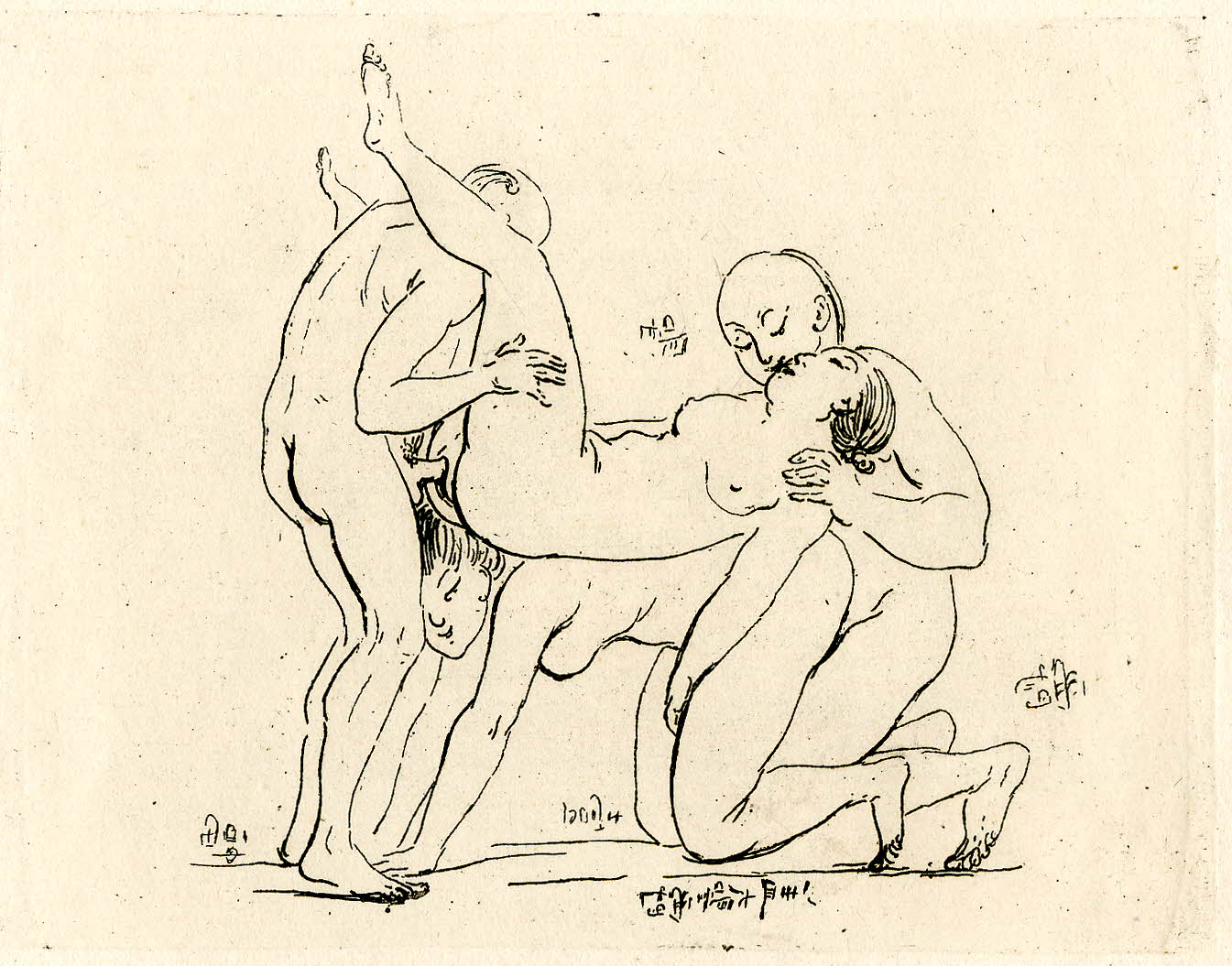
Engraving from Dominique Vivant Denon's Oeuvre Priapique. 1793

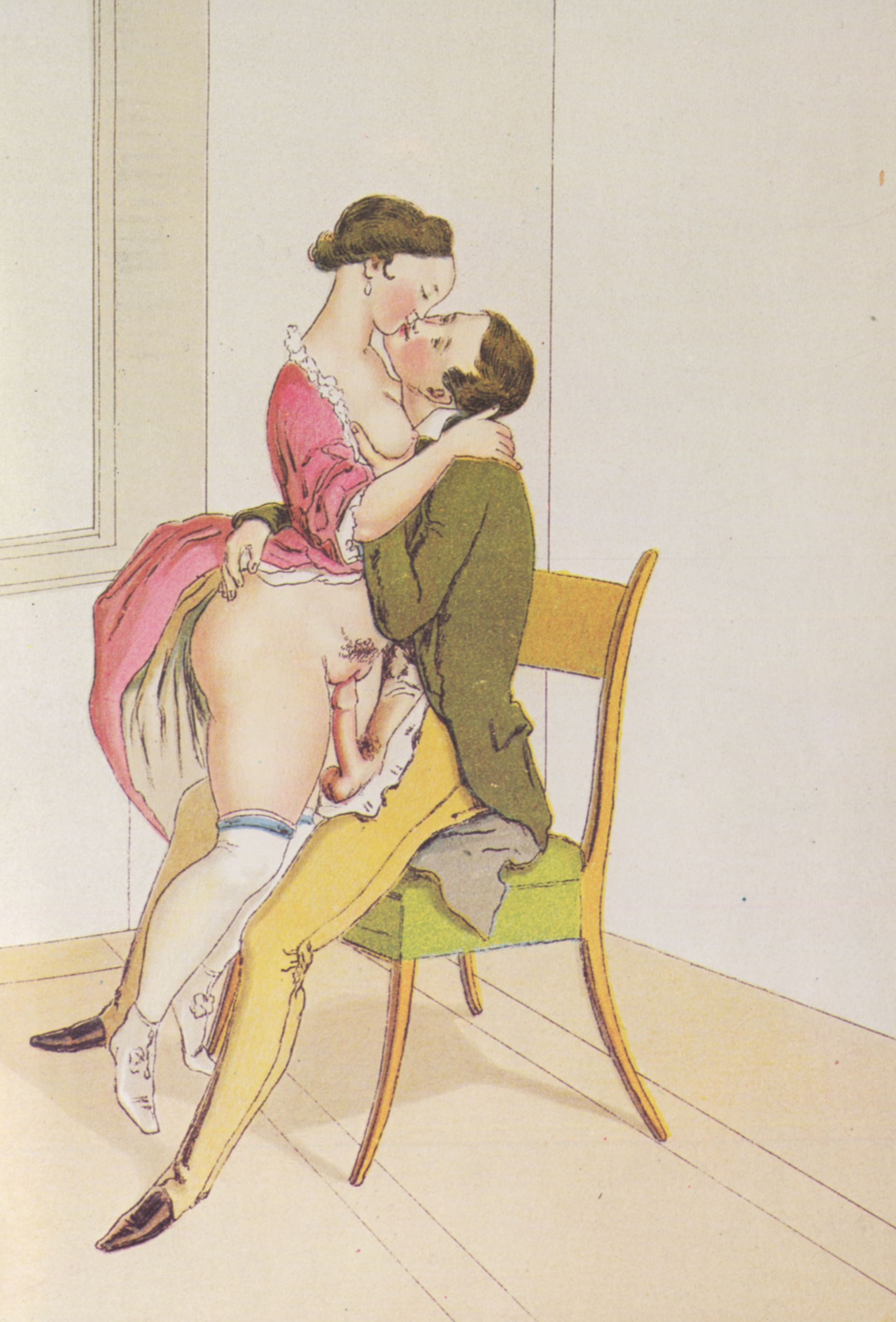
Das Liebespaar (The Lovers), 1910

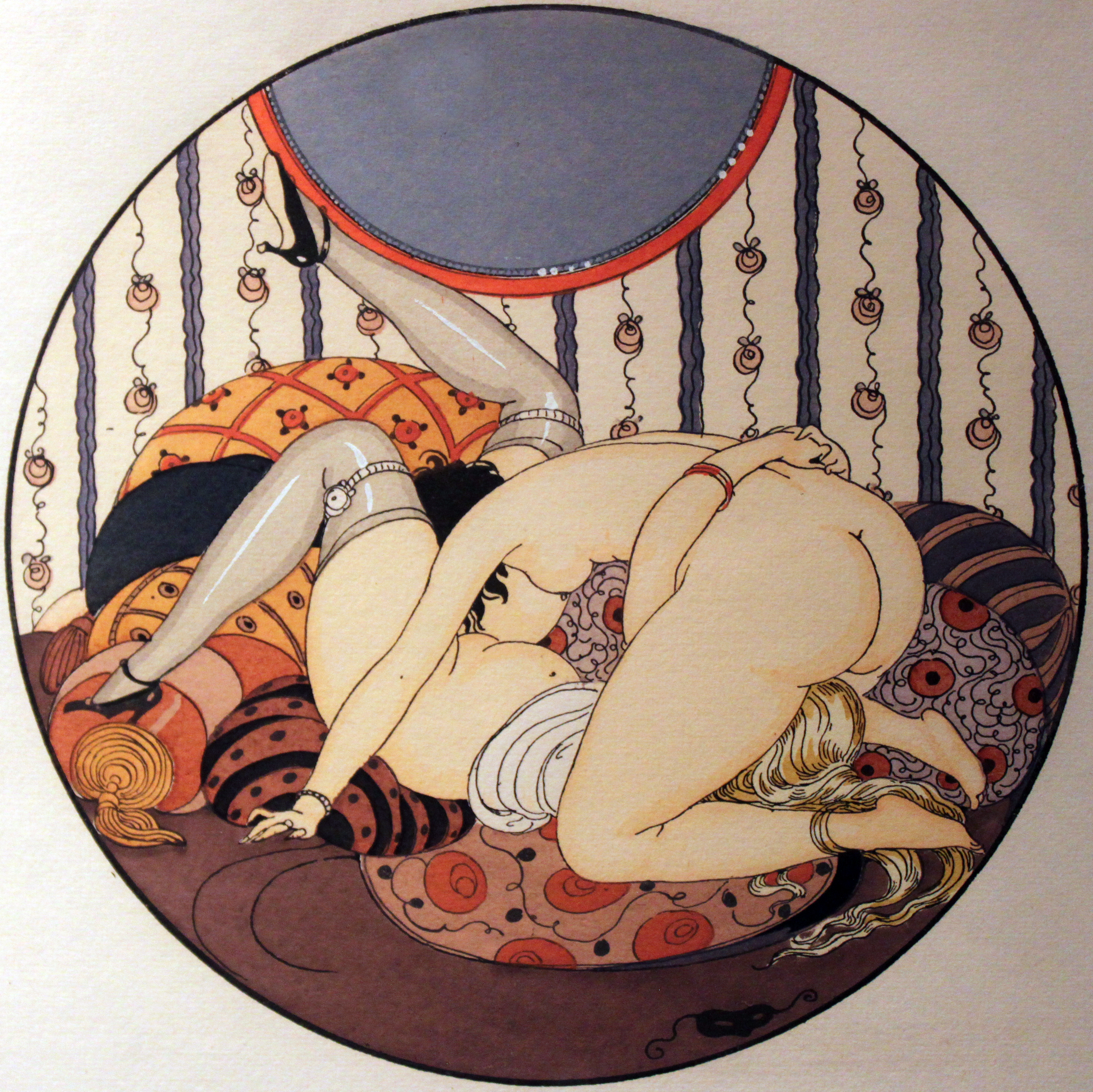
Gerda Wegener. 1925

== Beginnings of mass circulation ==
=== Printing ===
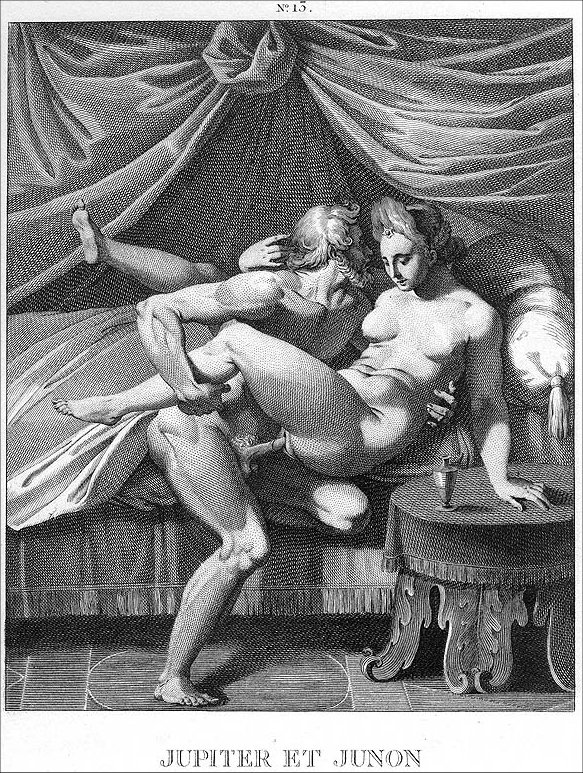
Jupiter and Juno. Jacques Joseph Coiny. Engraving. 1798.

Prints became very popular in Europe from the middle of the fifteenth century, and because of their compact nature, were very suitable for erotic depictions that did not need to be permanently on display. Nudity and the revival of classical subjects were associated from very early on in the history of the print.

Many prints of subjects from mythological subjects were clearly in part an excuse for erotic material; the engravings of Giovanni Battista Palumba in particular. An earthier eroticism is seen in a printing plate of 1475–1500 for an Allegory of Copulation where a young couple are having sex, with the woman's legs high in the air, at one end of a bench, while at the other end a huge penis, with legs and wings and a bell tied around the bottom of the glans, is climbing onto the bench. Although the plate has been used until worn out, then re-engraved and heavily used again, none of the contemporary impressions printed, which probably ran into the hundreds, have survived.

The loves of classical gods, especially those of Jupiter detailed in Ovid provided many subjects where actual sex was the key moment in the story, and its depiction was felt to be justified. In particular, Leda and the Swan, where the god appeared as a swan and seduced the woman, was depicted very explicitly; it seems that this was considered more acceptable because he appeared as a bird. For a period ending in the early 16th century the boundaries of what could be depicted in works for display in the semi-privacy of a Renaissance palace seemed uncertain. Michelangelo's Leda was a fairly large painting showing sex in progress, and one of the hundreds of illustrations to the book the Hypnerotomachia Poliphili of 1499 shows Leda and the Swan having sex on top of a triumphal car watched by a crowd.

In around 1524 – 1527 the artist Marcantonio Raimondi published I Modi. I modi contained engravings of sexual scenes and was created in a collaboration between Marcantonio raimondi and Giulio Romano. One idea is that Raimondi based the engravings on a series of erotic paintings that Giulio Romano was doing as a commission for the Palazzo del Te in Mantua. Pope Clement VII destroyed all copies of the engravings. Romano did not know of the engravings until Pietro Aretino, considered a founder of pornography, came to see the original paintings while Romano was still working on them. Aretino then composed sixteen explicit sonnets ("both in your cunt and your behind, my prick will make me happy, and you happy and blissful") to go with the paintings. I Modi was then published a second time in 1527, with the poems and the pictures, making this the first time erotic text and images were combined, though the papacy once more seized all the copies it could find. There are now no known copies of the first two editions of "I modi" by Marcantonio Raimondi and Giulio Romano. The text in existence is only a copy of a copy that was discovered 400 years later. In around 1530 Agostino Veneziano is thought to have created a replacement set of engravings for those that were in I modi.

In the 17th century, numerous examples of pornographic or erotic literature began to circulate. These included L'Ecole des Filles, a French work printed in 1655 that is considered to be the beginning of pornography in France. It consists of an illustrated dialogue between two women, a 16-year-old and her more worldly cousin, and their explicit discussions about sex. The author remains anonymous to this day, though a few suspected authors served light prison sentences for supposed authorship of the work. In his famous diary, Samuel Pepys records purchasing a copy for solitary reading and then burning it so that it would not be discovered by his wife; "the idle roguish book, L'escholle de filles; which I have bought in plain binding… because I resolve, as soon as I have read it, to burn it."

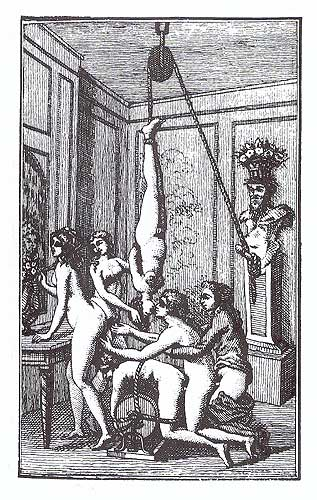
Illustration from Juliette by the Marquis de Sade

During the Enlightenment, many of the French free-thinkers began to exploit pornography as a medium of social criticism and satire. Libertine pornography was a subversive social commentary and often targeted the Catholic Church and general attitudes of sexual repression. The market for the mass-produced, inexpensive pamphlets soon became the bourgeoisie, making the upper class worry, as in England, that the morals of the lower class and weak-minded would be corrupted since women, slaves and the uneducated were seen as especially vulnerable during that time. The stories and illustrations (sold in the galleries of the Palais Royal, along with the services of prostitutes) were often anti-clerical and full of misbehaving priests, monks and nuns, a tradition that in French pornography continued into the 20th century. In the period leading up to the French Revolution, pornography was also used as political commentary; Marie Antoinette was often targeted with fantasies involving orgies, lesbian activities, and the paternity of her children, and rumours circulated about the supposed sexual inadequacies of Louis XVI. During and after the Revolution, the famous works of the Marquis de Sade were printed. They were often accompanied by illustrations and served as political commentary for their author.

The English answer to the French was Memoirs of a Woman of Pleasure (later abridged and renamed Fanny Hill), written in 1748 by John Cleland. While the text satirised the literary conventions and fashionable manners of 18th century England, it was more scandalous for depicting a woman, the narrator, enjoying and even reveling in sexual acts with no dire moral or physical consequences. The text is hardly explicit as Cleland wrote the entire book using euphemisms for sex acts and body parts, employing 50 different ones just for the term penis. Two small earthquakes were credited to the book by the Bishop of London and Cleland was arrested and briefly imprisoned, but Fanny Hill continued to be published and is one of the most reprinted books in the English language. However, it was not legal to own this book in the United States until 1963 and in the United Kingdom until 1970.

=== Photography ===
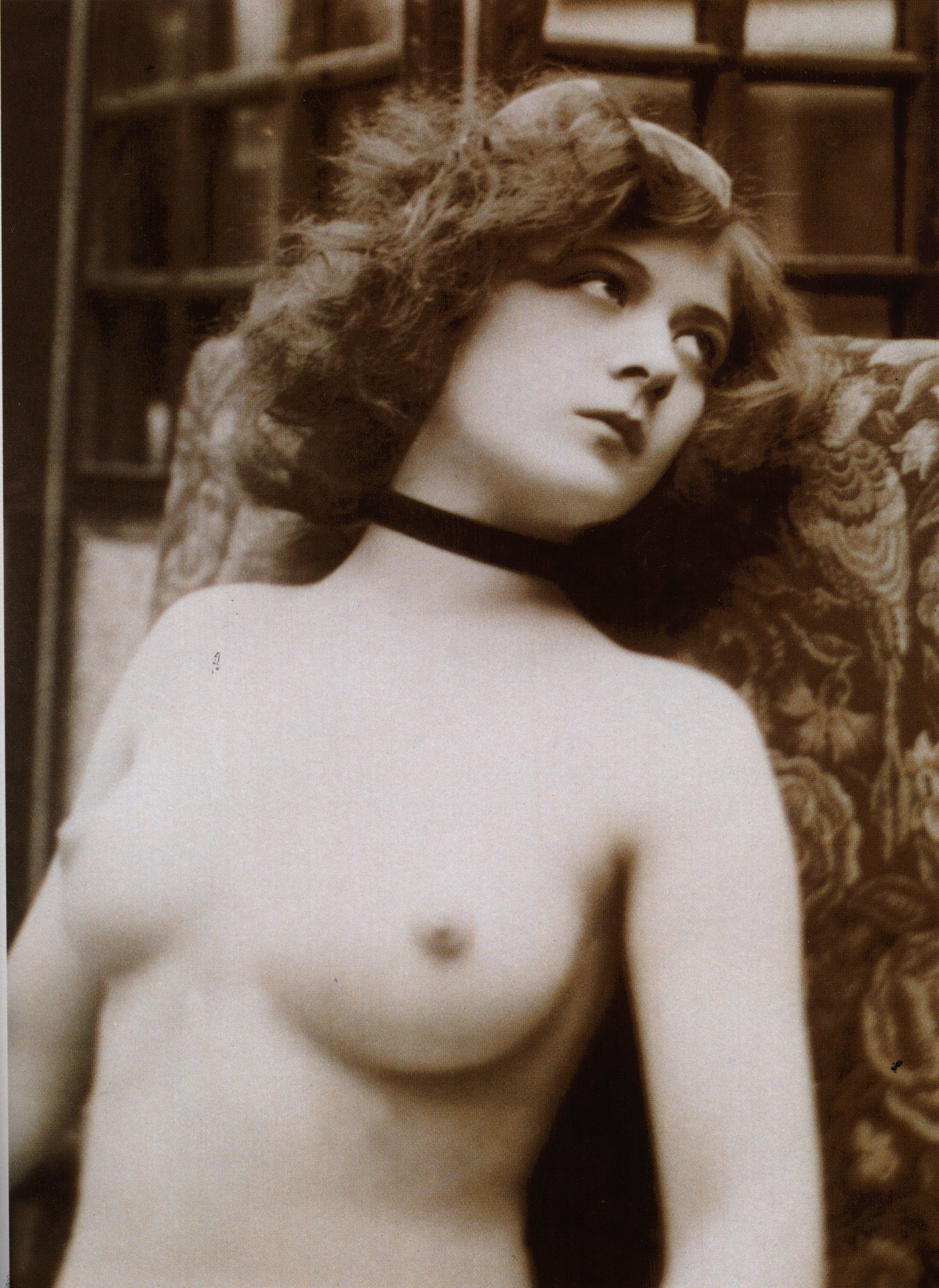
19th-century nude photograph

In 1839, Louis Daguerre presented the first practical process of photography to the French Academy of Sciences. Unlike earlier photographic methods, his daguerreotypes had stunning quality and detail and did not fade with time. Artists adopted the new technology as a new way to depict the nude form, which in practice was the feminine form. In so doing, at least initially, they tried to follow the styles and traditions of the art form. Traditionally, an académie was a nude study done by a painter to master the female (or male) form. Each had to be registered with the French government and approved or they could not be sold. Soon, nude photographs were being registered as académie and marketed as aids to painters. However, the realism of a photograph as opposed to the idealism of a painting made many of these intrinsically erotic.

The daguerreotypes were not without drawbacks, however. The main difficulty was that they could only be reproduced by photographing the original picture since each image was an original and the all-metal process does not use negatives. In addition, the earliest daguerreotypes had exposure times ranging from three to fifteen minutes, making them somewhat impractical for portraiture. Unlike earlier drawings, action could not be shown. The poses that the models struck had to be held very still for a long time. Because of this, the standard pornographic image shifted from one of two or more people engaged in sex acts to a solitary woman exposing her genitals. Since one picture could cost a week's salary, the audience for these nudes mostly consisted of artists and the upper echelon of society. It was cheaper to hire a prostitute and experience the sex acts than it was to own a picture of them in the 1840s. Stereoscopy was invented in 1838 and became extremely popular for daguerreotypes, including the erotic images. This technology produced a type of three dimensional view that suited erotic images quite well. Although thousands of erotic daguerreotypes were created, only around 800 are known to survive; however, their uniqueness and expense meant that they were once the toys of rich men. Due to their rarity, the works can sell for more than 10,000 GBP.

In 1841, William Fox Talbot patented the calotype process, the first negative-positive process, making possible multiple copies. This invention permitted an almost limitless number of prints to be produced from a glass negative. Also, the reduction in exposure time made a true mass market for pornographic pictures possible. The technology was immediately employed to reproduce nude portraits. Paris soon became the centre of this trade. In 1848 only thirteen photography studios existed in Paris; by 1860, there were over 400. Most of them profited by selling illicit pornography to the masses who could now afford it. The pictures were also sold near train stations, by traveling salesmen and women in the streets who hid them under their dresses. They were often produced in sets (of four, eight or twelve), and exported internationally, mainly to England and the United States. Both the models and the photographers were commonly from the working class, and the artistic model excuse was increasingly hard to use. By 1855, no more photographic nudes were being registered as académie, and the business had gone underground to escape prosecution.

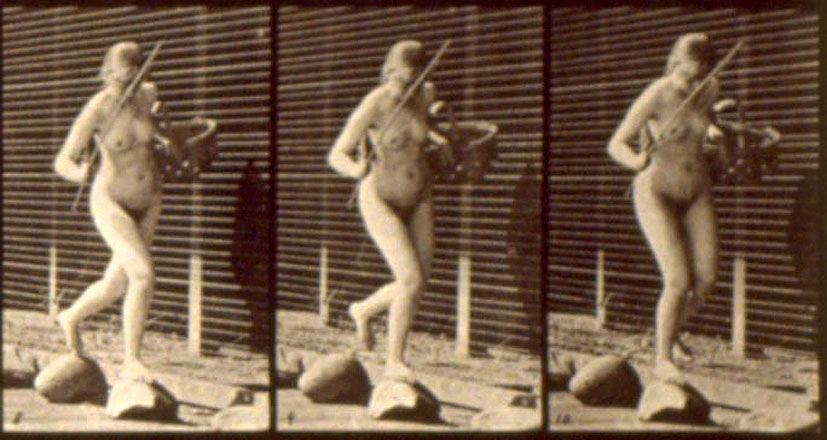
Eadweard Muybridge: Woman walking with fishing pole (detail)

The Victorian pornographic tradition in the UK had three main elements: French photographs, erotic prints (sold in shops in Holywell Street, a long vanished London thoroughfare, swept away by the Aldwych), and printed literature. The ability to reproduce photographs in bulk assisted the rise of a new business individual, the porn dealer. Many of these dealers took advantage of the postal system to send out photographic cards in plain wrappings to their subscribers. Therefore, the development of a reliable international postal system facilitated the beginnings of the pornography trade. Victorian pornography had several defining characteristics. It reflected a very mechanistic view of the human anatomy and its functions. Science, the new obsession, was used to ostensibly study the human body. Consequently, the sexuality of the subject is often depersonalised, and is without any passion or tenderness. At this time, it also became popular to depict nude photographs of women of exotic ethnicities, under the umbrella of science. Studies of this type can be found in the work of Eadweard Muybridge. Although he photographed both men and women, the women were often given props like market baskets and fishing poles, making the images of women thinly disguised erotica. Parallel to the British printing history, photographers and printers in France frequently turned to the medium of postcards, producing great numbers of them. Such cards came to be known in the US as "French postcards".

== Magazines ==
American Beauties (1926-27), an early men's magazine

During the Victorian period, illegal pornographic periodicals such as The Pearl, which ran for eighteen issues between 1879 and 1880, circulated clandestinely among circles of elite urban gentlemen. In 1880, halftone printing was used to reproduce photographs inexpensively for the first time. The invention of halftone printing took pornography and erotica in new directions at the beginning of the 20th century. The new printing processes allowed photographic images to be reproduced easily in black and white, whereas printers were previously limited to engravings, woodcuts and line cuts for illustrations. This was the first format that allowed pornography to become a mass market phenomena, it now being more affordable and more easily acquired than any previous form.

First appearing in France, the new magazines featured nude (often, burlesque actresses were hired as models) and semi-nude photographs on the cover and throughout; while these would now be termed softcore, they were quite shocking for the time. The publications soon either masqueraded as "art magazines" or publications celebrating the new cult of naturism, with titles such as Photo Bits, Body in Art, Figure Photography, Nude Living and Modern Art for Men. Health and Efficiency, started in 1900, was a typical naturist magazine in Britain.

Another early form of pornography were comic books known as Tijuana bibles that began appearing in the U.S. in the 1920s and lasted until the publishing of glossy colour men's magazines commenced. These were crude hand drawn scenes often using popular characters from cartoons and culture.

In the 1940s, the word "pinup" was coined to describe pictures torn from men's magazines and calendars and "pinned up" on the wall by U.S. soldiers in World War II. While the '40s images focused mostly on legs, by the '50s, the emphasis shifted to breasts. Betty Grable and Marilyn Monroe were two of the most popular pinup models. In the second half of the 20th century, pornography evolved into the men's magazines such as Playboy and Modern Man of the 1950s. In fact, the beginning of the modern men's glossy magazine (or girlie magazine) can be traced to the 1953 purchase by Hugh Hefner of a photograph of Marilyn Monroe to use as the centerfold of his new magazine Playboy. Soon, this type of magazine was the primary medium in which pornography was consumed.

In postwar Britain digest magazines such as Beautiful Britons, Spick and Span, with their interest in nylons and underwear and the racier Kamera published by Harrison Marks were incredibly popular. The creative force behind Kamera was Harrison Marks' partner Pamela Green. These magazines featured nude or semi-nude women in extremely coy or flirtatious poses with no hint of pubic hair.

Penthouse, started by Bob Guccione in England in 1965, took a different approach. Women looked indirectly at the camera, as if they were going about their private idylls. This change of emphasis was influential in erotic depictions of women. Penthouse was also the first magazine to publish pictures that included pubic hair and full frontal nudity, both of which were considered beyond the bounds of the erotic and in the realm of pornography at the time. In the late 1960s, magazines began to move into more explicit displays often focusing on the buttocks as standards of what could be legally depicted and what readers wanted to see changed. By the 1970s, they were focusing on the pubic area and eventually, by the 1990s, featured sexual penetration, lesbianism and homosexuality, group sex, masturbation, and fetishes in the more hard-core magazines such as Hustler.

Magazines for every taste and fetish were soon created due to the low cost of producing them. Magazines for the gay community flourished, the most notable and one of the first being Physique Pictorial, started in 1951 by Bob Mizer when his attempt to sell the services of male models; however, Athletic Model Guild photographs of them failed. It was published in black and white, in a very clear yet photographic manner celebrating the male form and was published for nearly 50 years. The magazine was innovative in its use of props and costumes to depict the now standard gay icons like cowboys, gladiators and sailors.

== Moving pictures ==
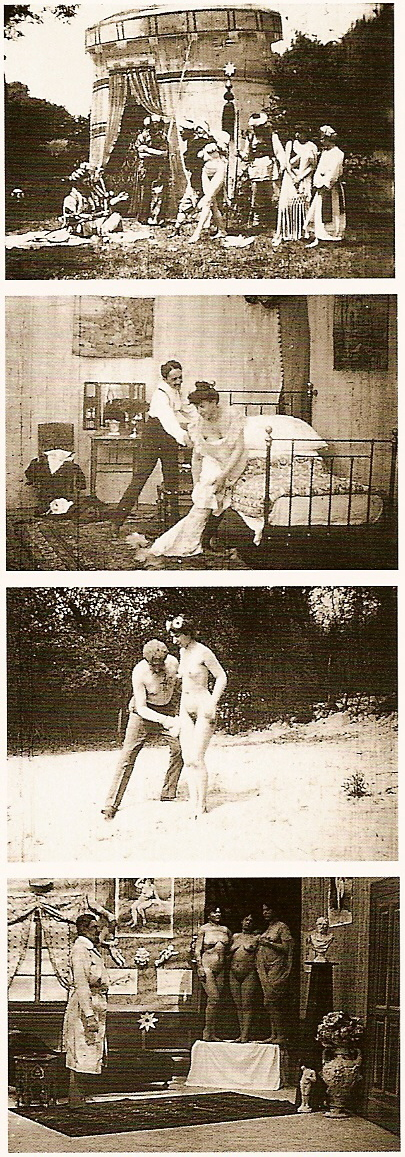
Images from early Austrian erotic films by Johann Schwarzer

Production of erotic films commenced almost immediately after the invention of the motion picture. Two of the earliest pioneers were Frenchmen Eugène Pirou and Albert Kirchner. Kirchner (under the name "Léar") directed the earliest surviving erotic film for Pirou. The 7-minute 1896 film Le Coucher de la Mariee had Louise Willy performing a bathroom striptease. Other French filmmakers also considered that profits could be made from this type of risqué films, showing women disrobing.

Also in 1896, Fatima's Coochie-Coochie dance was released as a short kinetoscope film featuring a gyrating belly dancer named Fatima. Her gyrating and moving pelvis was censored, one of the earliest films to be censored. At the time, there were numerous risqué films that featured exotic dancers. In the same year, The May Irwin Kiss contained the very first kiss on film. It was a 20-second film loop, with a close-up of a nuzzling couple followed by a short peck on the lips ("the mysteries of the kiss revealed"). The kissing scene was denounced as shocking and pornographic to early moviegoers and caused the Roman Catholic Church to call for censorship and moral reform – because kissing in public at the time could lead to prosecution. A tableau vivant style is used in short film The Birth of the Pearl (1901) featuring an unnamed long-haired young model wearing a flesh-colored body stocking in a direct frontal pose that provides a provocative view of the female body. The pose is in the style of Botticelli's The Birth of Venus.

Because Pirou is nearly unknown as a pornographic filmmaker, credit is often given to other films for being the first. In Black and White and Blue (2008), one of the most scholarly attempts to document the origins of the clandestine 'stag film' trade, Dave Thompson recounts ample evidence that such an industry first had sprung up in the brothels of Buenos Aires and other South American cities by around the start of the 20th century, and then quickly spread through Central Europe over the following few years; however, none of these earliest pornographic films is known to survive. According to Patrick Robertson's Film Facts, "the earliest pornographic motion picture which can definitely be dated is A L'Ecu d'Or ou la bonne auberge" made in France in 1908; the plot depicts a weary soldier who has a tryst with a servant girl at an inn. The Argentinian El Satario might be even older; it has been dated to somewhere between 1907 and 1912. He also notes that "the oldest surviving pornographic films are contained in America's Kinsey Collection. One film demonstrates how early pornographic conventions were established. The German film Am Abend (1910) is "a ten-minute film which begins with a woman masturbating alone in her bedroom, and progresses to scenes of her with a man performing straight sex, fellatio and anal penetration."

In Austria, Johann Schwarzer formed his Saturn-Film production company which was able to produce 52 erotic productions between 1906 and 1911, when the company was dissolved by the censorship authorities and the films destroyed.

Soon illegal stag films or blue films, as they were called, were produced underground by amateurs for many years starting in the 1940s. Processing the film took considerable time and resources, with people using their bathtubs to wash the film when processing facilities (often tied to organized crime) were unavailable. The films were then circulated privately or by traveling salesman but being caught viewing or possessing them put one at the risk of prison.

The post-war era saw developments that further stimulated the growth of a mass market. Technological developments, particularly the introduction of the 8mm and super-8 film gauges, resulted in the widespread use of amateur cinematography. Entrepreneurs emerged to supply this market. In the UK, the productions of Harrison Marks were "soft core", but considered risqué in the 1950s. On the continent, such films were more explicit. Lasse Braun was as a pioneer in quality colour productions that were, in the early days, distributed by making use of his father's diplomatic privileges. Pornography was first legalized in Denmark July 1969, soon followed by the Netherlands the same year and Sweden in 1971, and this led to an explosion of commercially produced pornography in those countries, with the Color Climax Corporation quickly becoming the leading pornographic producer for the next couple of decades. Now that being a pornographer was a legitimate occupation, there was no shortage of businessmen to invest in proper plant and equipment capable of turning out a mass-produced, cheap, but quality product. Vast amounts of this new pornography, both magazines and films, were smuggled into other parts of Europe, where it was sold "under the counter" or (sometimes) shown in "members only" cinema clubs.

The first explicitly pornographic film with a plot that received a general theatrical release in the U.S. is generally considered to be Mona the Virgin Nymph (also known as Mona), a 59-minute 1970 feature by Bill Osco and Howard Ziehm, who went on to create the relatively high-budget hardcore/softcore (depending on the release) cult film Flesh Gordon. The 1971 film Boys in the Sand represented a number of pornographic firsts. As the first generally available gay pornographic film, the film was the first to include on-screen credits for its cast and crew (albeit largely under pseudonyms), to parody the title of a mainstream film (in this case, The Boys in the Band), and to be reviewed by The New York Times. In 1972, pornographic films hit their public peak in the United States with both Deep Throat and Behind the Green Door being met with public approval and becoming social phenomena.

The Devil in Miss Jones followed in 1973 and many predicted that frank depictions of sex onscreen would soon become commonplace, with William Rotsler saying in 1973, "Erotic films are here to stay. Eventually they will simply merge into the mainstream of motion pictures and disappear as a labeled sub-division. Nothing can stop this". In practice, a combination of factors put an end to big budget productions and the mainstreaming of pornography, and in many places it never got close – with Deep Throat not approved in its uncut form in the UK until 2000, and not shown publicly until June 2005.

== Video and digital depictions ==
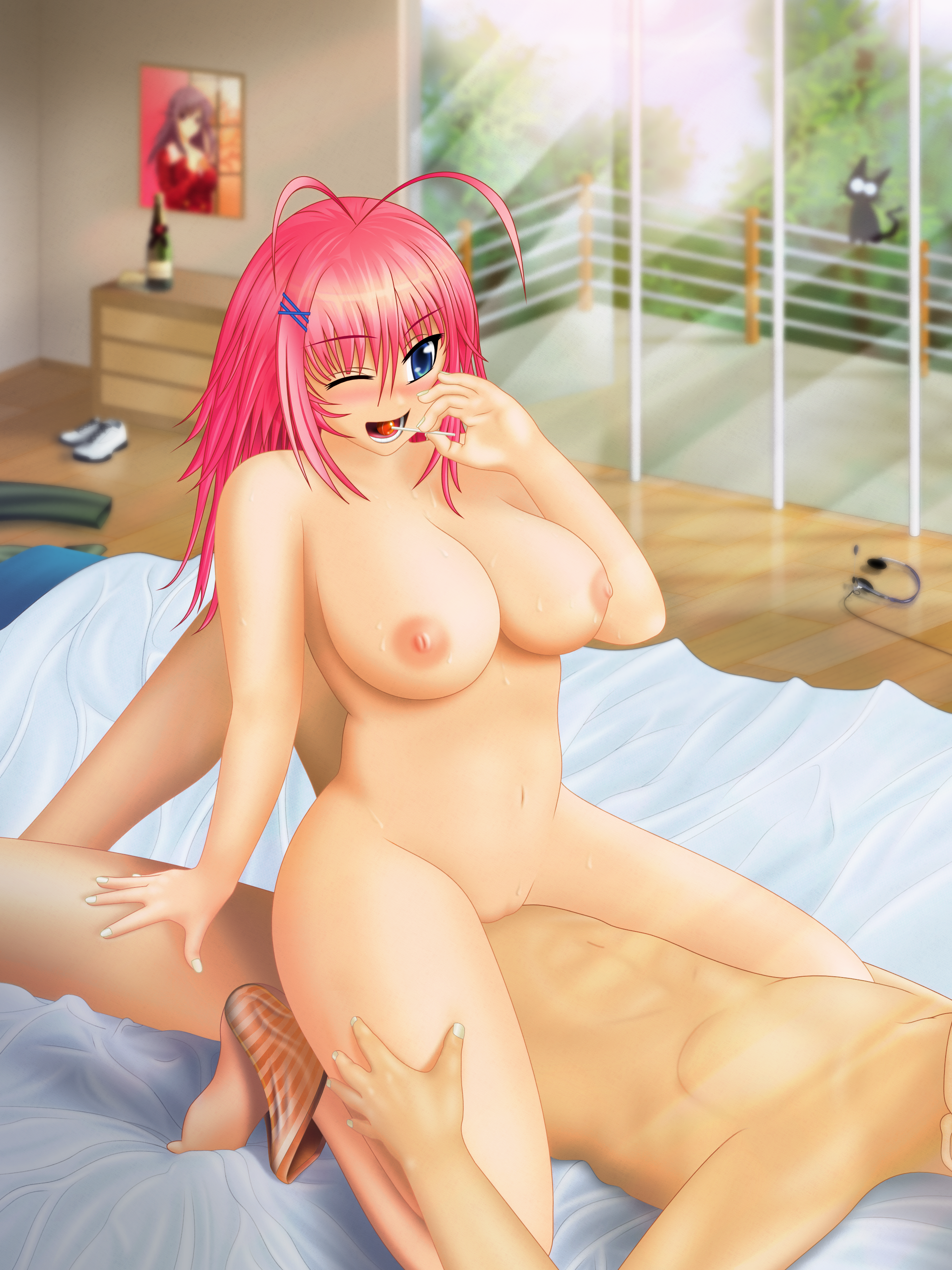
A digital drawing in the style of hentai

By 1982, most pornographic films were being shot on the cheaper and more convenient medium of videotape. Many film directors resisted this shift at first because of the different image quality that video tape produced; however, those who did change soon were collecting most of the industry's profits since consumers overwhelmingly preferred the new format. The technology change happened quickly and completely when directors realised that continuing to shoot on film was no longer a profitable option. This change moved the films out of the theaters and into people's private homes. This was the end of the age of big budget productions and the mainstreaming of pornography. It soon went back to its lower budget roots and expanded to cover more fetishes and niches possible due to the low cost of production. Instead of hundreds of pornographic films being made each year, thousands now were, including compilations of just the sex scenes from various videos.

Erotic CD-ROMs were popular in the late 1980s and early 1990s because they brought an unprecedented element of interactiveness and fantasy. However, their poor quality was a drawback and when the Internet became common in households, their sales declined. Beginning in the 1990s, the Internet became the preferred source of pornography for many people, offering both privacy in viewing and the chance to interact with people. The spread of technology such as digital cameras, both moving and still, blurred the lines between erotic films, photographs and amateur and professional productions. Production became easily achieved by anyone with access to the equipment. Much of the pornography available today is produced by amateurs. Digital media allows photographers and filmmakers to manipulate images in ways previously not possible, heightening the drama or eroticism of a depiction.

High-definition video shows signs of changing the image of pornography as the technology is increasingly used for professional productions. The porn industry was one of the first to adopt the technology and it may have been a deciding factor in the format competition between HD DVD and Blu-ray Disc. Additionally, the clearer sharper images it provides have prompted performers to get cosmetic surgery and professional grooming to hide imperfections that are not visible on other video formats. Other adaptations have been different camera angles and techniques for close-ups and lighting.

== See also ==
- Charles Guyette
- Cultural history of the buttocks
- Eric Stanton
- Erotica
- Erotic art
- Erotic art in Pompeii and Herculaneum
- Gene Bilbrew
- History of human sexuality
- Homosexuality in ancient Greece
- Homosexuality in ancient Rome
- I Modi
- Irving Klaw
- John Willie
- Pederasty in Ancient Greece
- Prostitution in ancient Rome
- Sexuality in ancient Rome
