= Depictions of nudity =

Visual representations of the nude human form

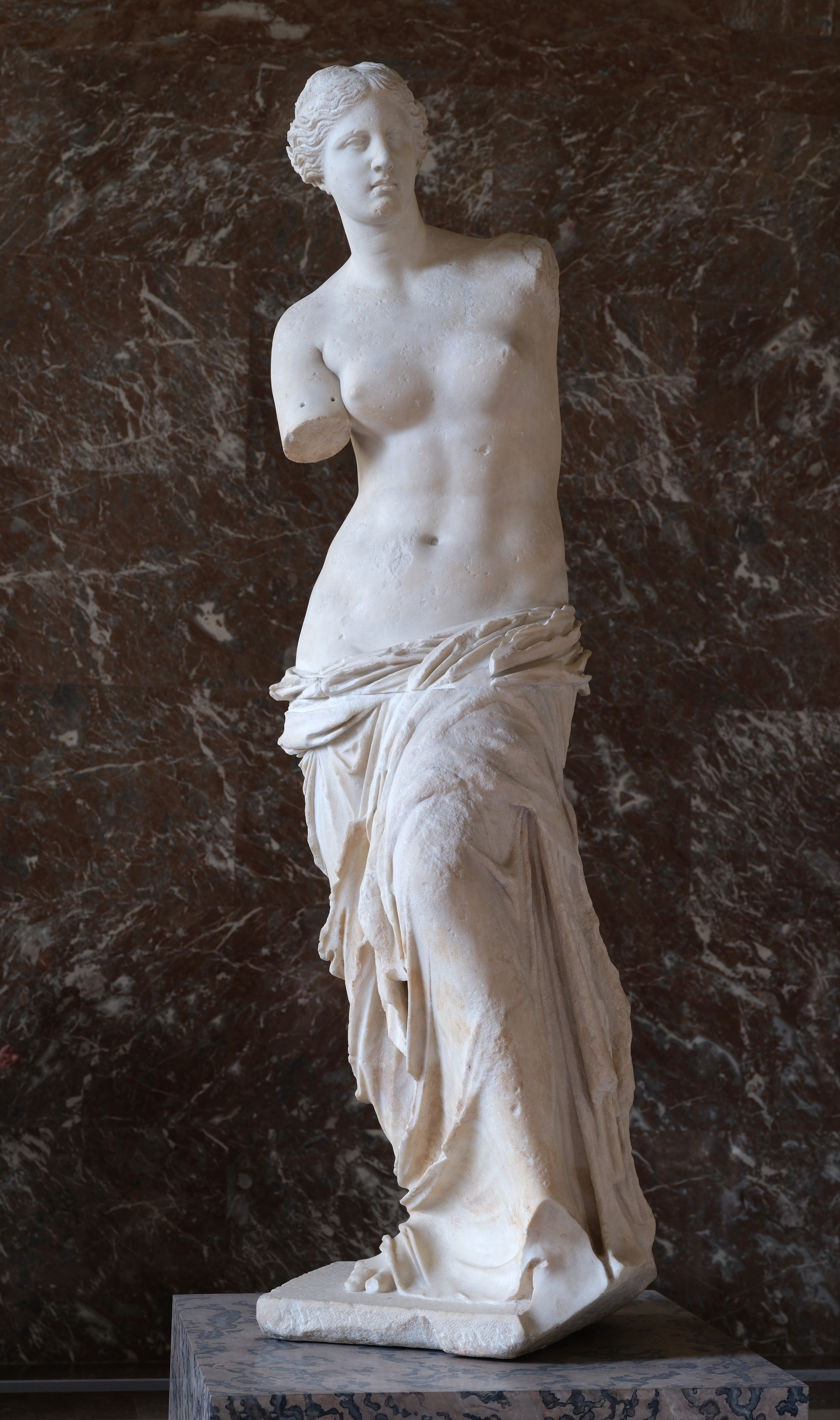
The Venus de Milo (2nd century BC), is one of the most iconic ancient Greek nudes. It was sculpted in the Hellenistic period and remains popular in the modern era.

Depictions of nudity include sculptures, paintings, photographs, and other visual representations or portrayals of the unclothed human body. In the English language, the word nakedness means lacking in clothing, with some embarrassment implied, whereas nudity, at least in an educated context, means a balanced, healthy, and confident body. In a picture-making civilization, pictorial conventions continually reaffirm what is natural in human appearance, which is part of socialization. In Western societies, depictions of nudity may appear in an informational (including both scientific and educational), artistic, or pornographic context. By depicting the nude human form, artists may seek to complete an academic exercise, to demonstrate mastery, to represent human physical beauty, or to explore the human body in its natural state. Any image not easily fitting into one of these three categories may be misinterpreted, leading to disputes. The most contentious disputes are between fine art and erotic images, which define the legal distinction of which images are permitted or prohibited.

A depiction is defined as any lifelike image, ranging from precise representations to verbal descriptions. Portrayal is a synonym of depiction, but includes playing a role on stage as one form of representation.

== Nudity in art ==
Nudity in art—painting, sculpture, and more recently photography—has generally reflected social standards of the time in aesthetics and morality (especially chastity and modesty). In the history of art, the human body has been one of the principal subjects for artists. In fact, it has been depicted in paintings and statues since prehistory. Venus figurines, often with pronounced depictions of female genitals, are well-known examples from this era.

For the ancient Greeks, male nudity was considered heroic and sensually pleasing. This attitude is reflected in their artworks, which portray the human body in idealized form. In addition, it was perfectly acceptable for a man to openly admire the physique of another. Vase paintings and sculptures of nude women were also made, exhibiting the female counterpart to heroic nudity in men. One example of such an artwork is the sculpture Aphrodite of Knidos by Praxiteles of Athens from the fourth century B.C. It was the first life-size stone sculpture of the nude female form in history. Although the original is now lost, it has inspired numerous other artworks, among them, the Capitoline Venus and the Medici Venus.

Bronzino's so-called "allegorical portraits" such as the Portrait of Andrea Doria as Neptune, of Genoese Admiral Andrea Doria, are less typical but possibly even more fascinating due to the peculiarity of placing a publicly recognized personality in the nude as a mythical figure, Neptune or Poseidon, god of the sea and earthquakes. Although naked, Doria is not fragile or frail. He is depicted as a powerful virile man, showing masculine spirit, strength, vigor, and power.

Starting in the nineteenth century, the classical ideals of feminine beauty, such as Aphrodite or the Three Graces, no longer monopolized depictions of the female nude. Artists had turned their attention towards curvaceous, elegant, and feminine but nevertheless ordinary women, without a pretense to allegorical or mythological meaning. La maja desnuda, completed by Francisco Goya in around 1800, is likely the first "profane"—meaning, non-divine—female nude of this kind in Western art to be made public. Before that, paintings of nude females were not unknown, even in Spain, but these were hung in private rooms, like the Rokeby Venus (mid-1600s) by Diego Velázquez.

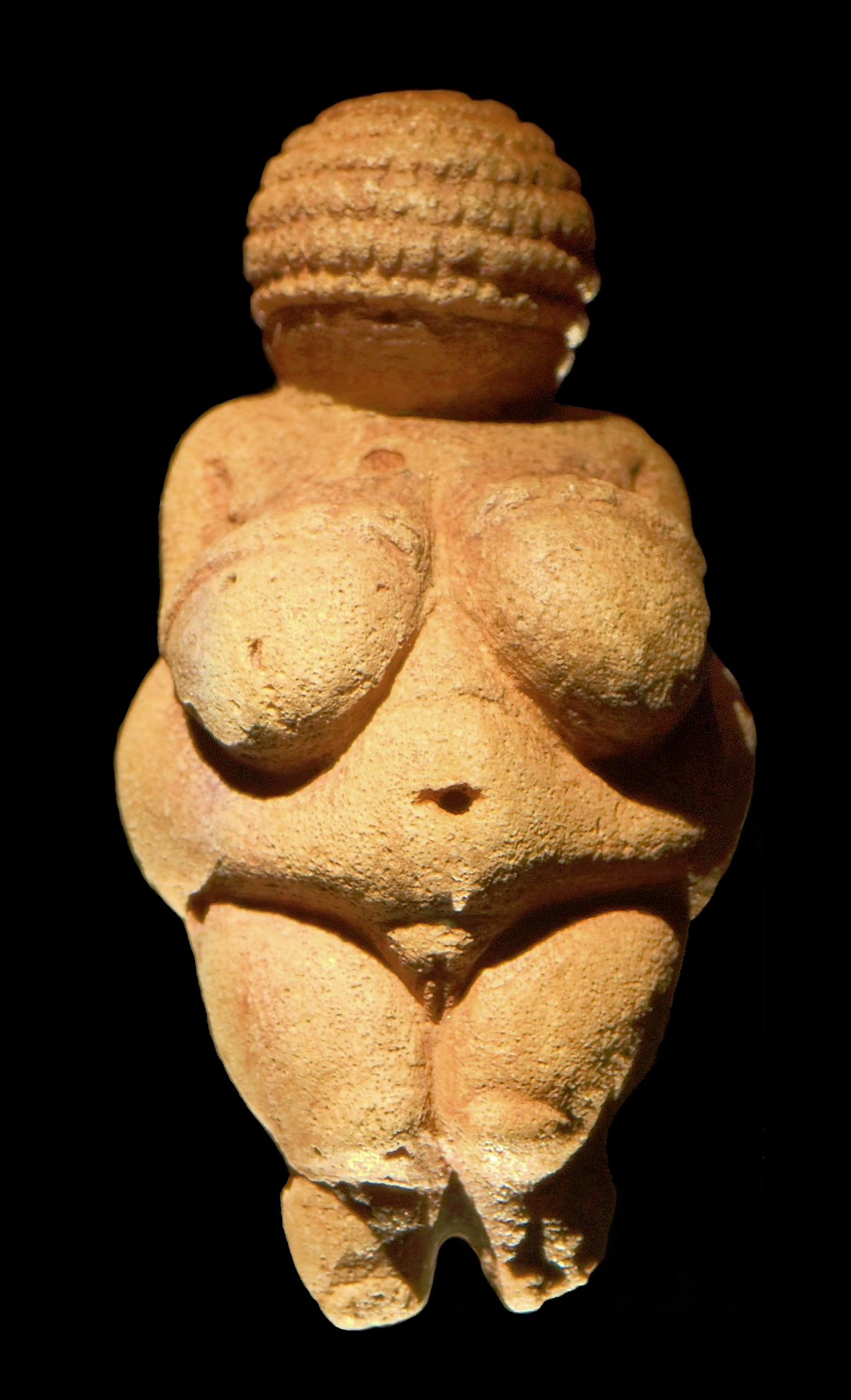
Venus of Willendorf (circa 29,500 years ago)

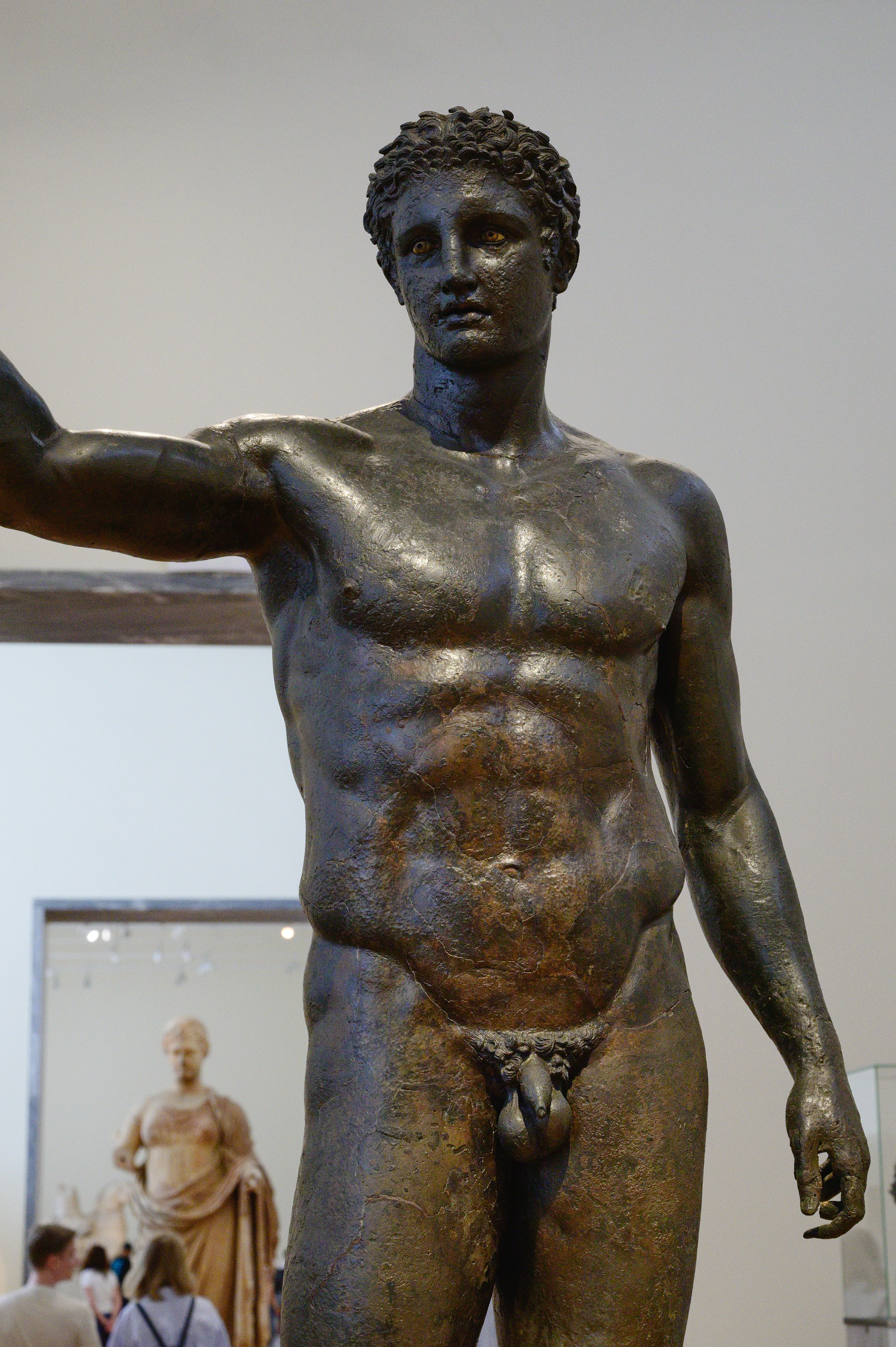
The Antikythera Youth (70-60 BC)

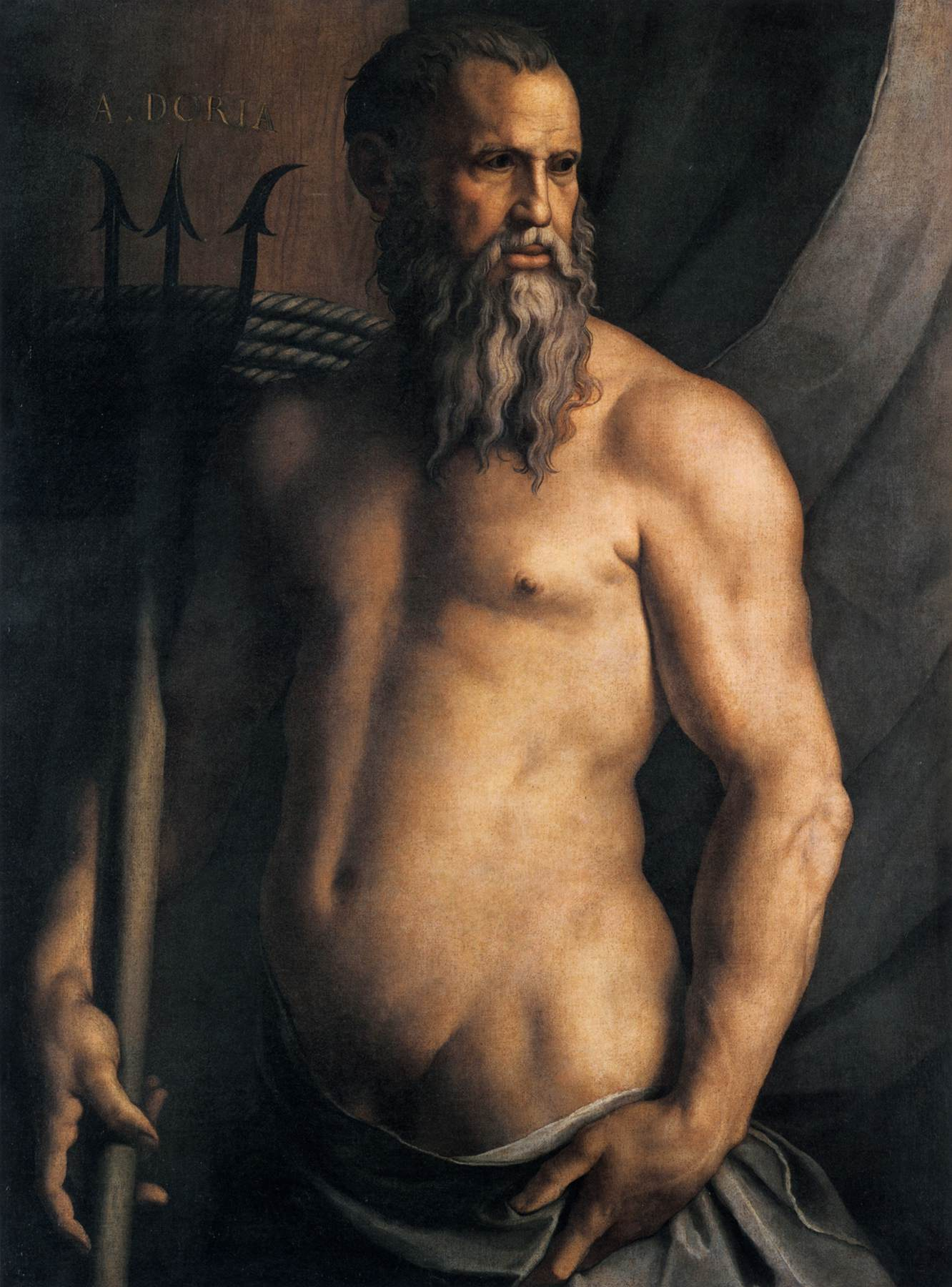
Portrait of Andrea Doria as Neptune (1550 to 1555) by Angelo Bronzino

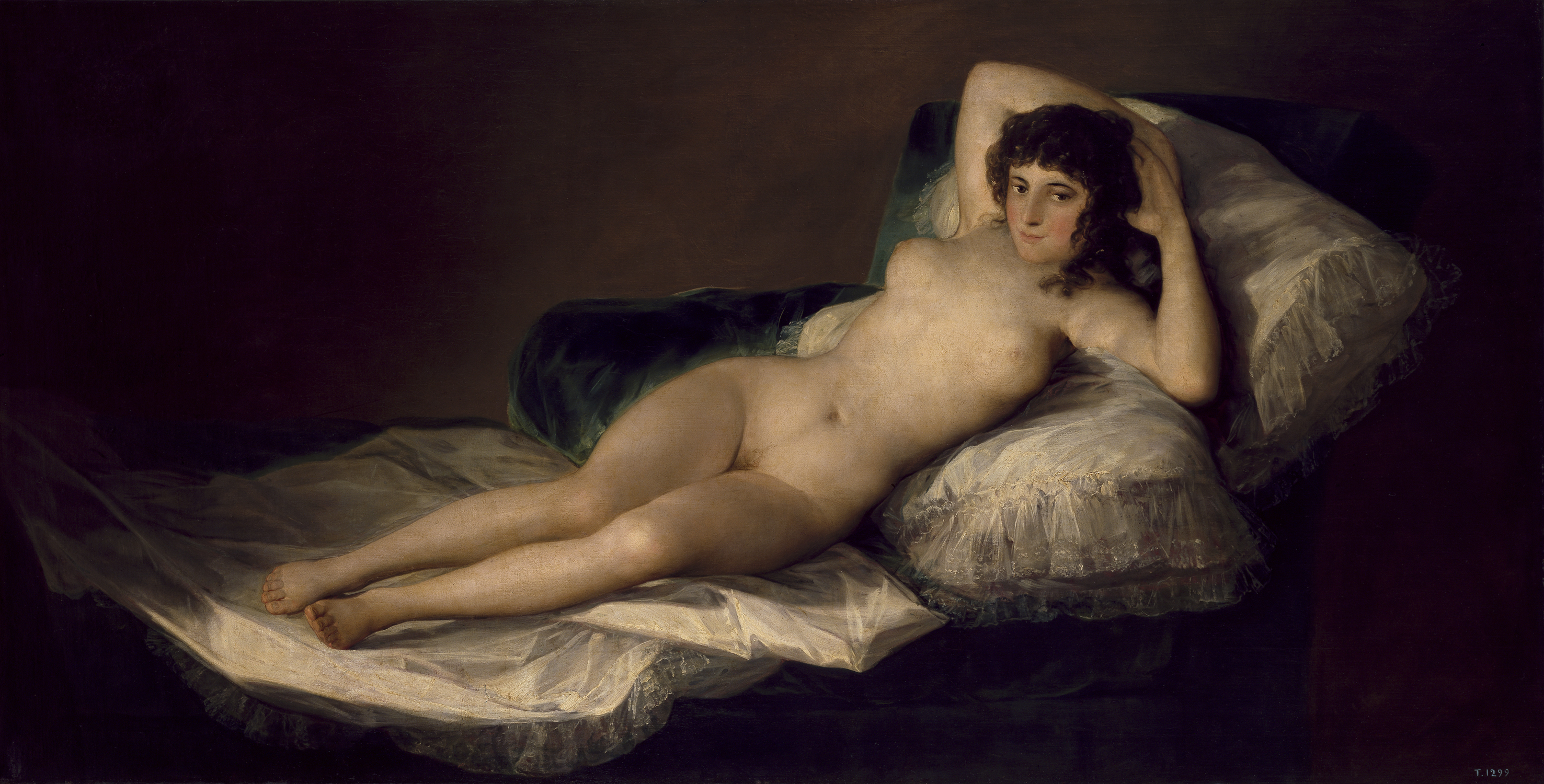
La maja desnuda (c. 1800) by Francisco Goya

=== Decorative or monumental art ===
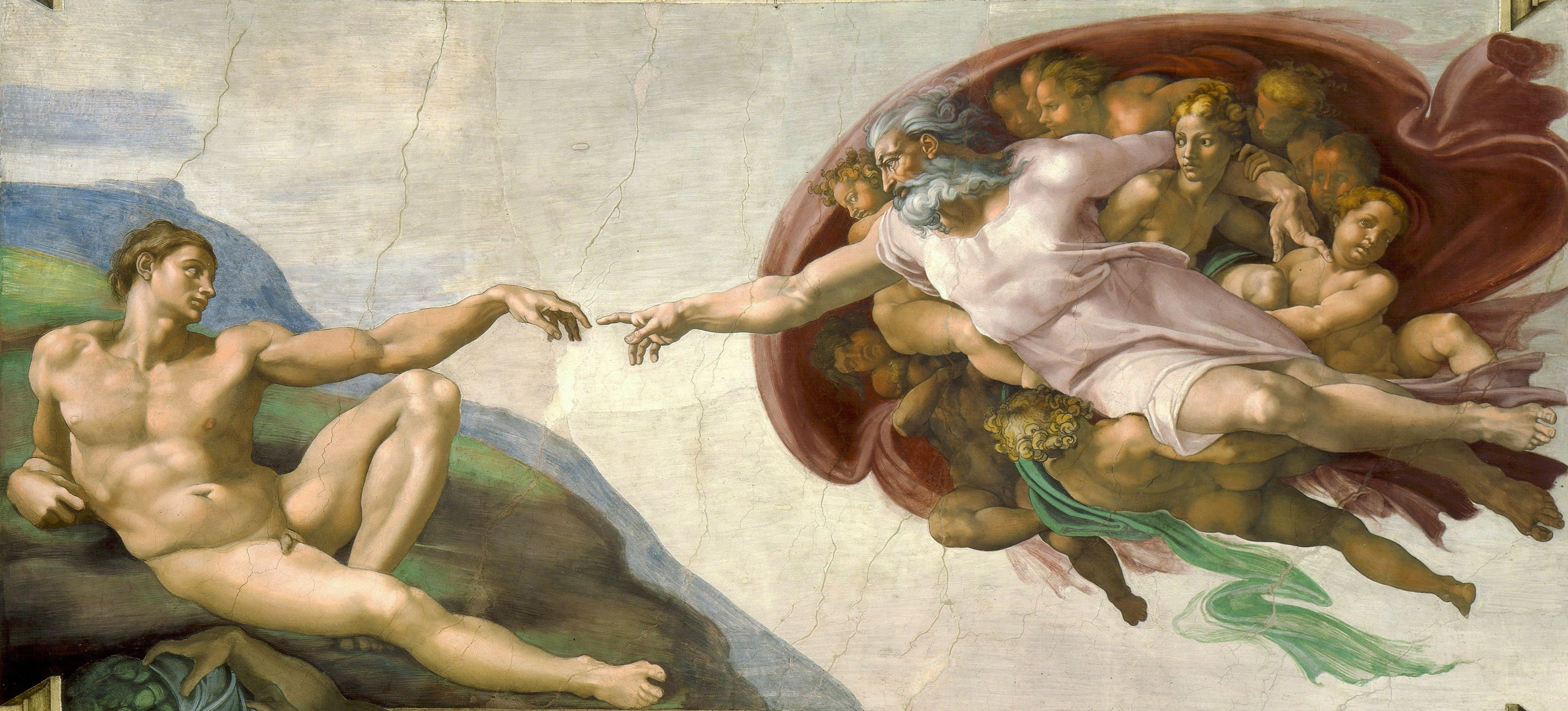
The Creation of Adam (c. 1511) by Michelangelo on the ceiling of the Sistine Chapel, Vatican City

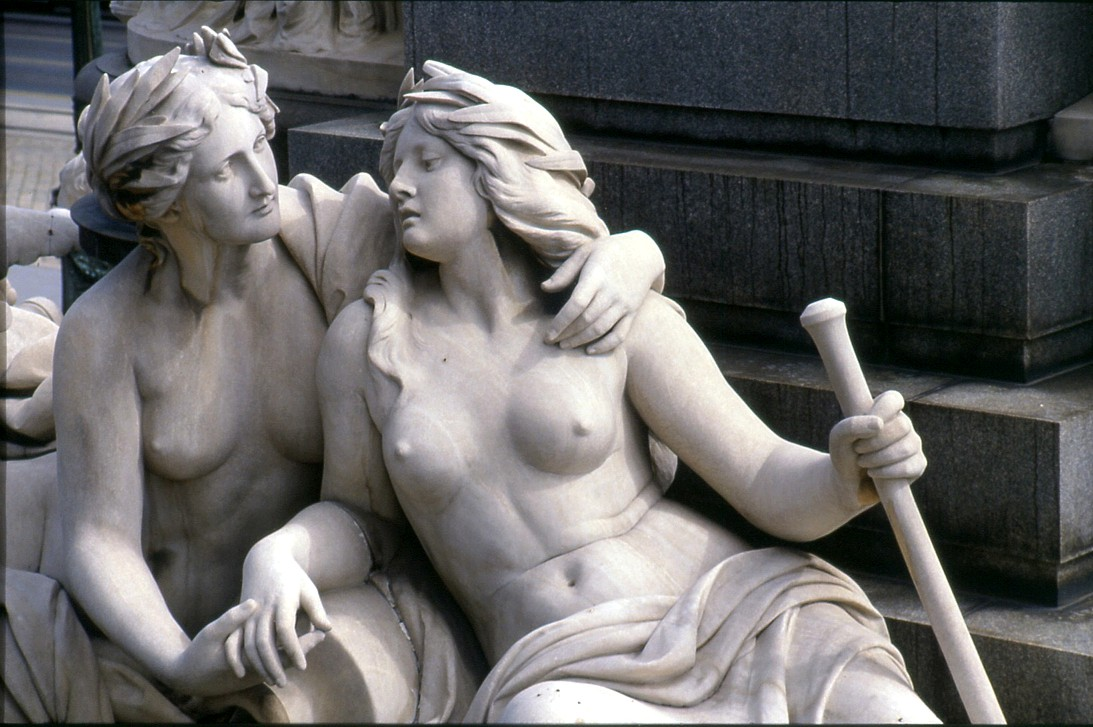
Allegories of the rivers Elbe and Vltava (German: Moldau) at the base of the Pallas Athena Fountain, Parliament Building, Vienna, Austria

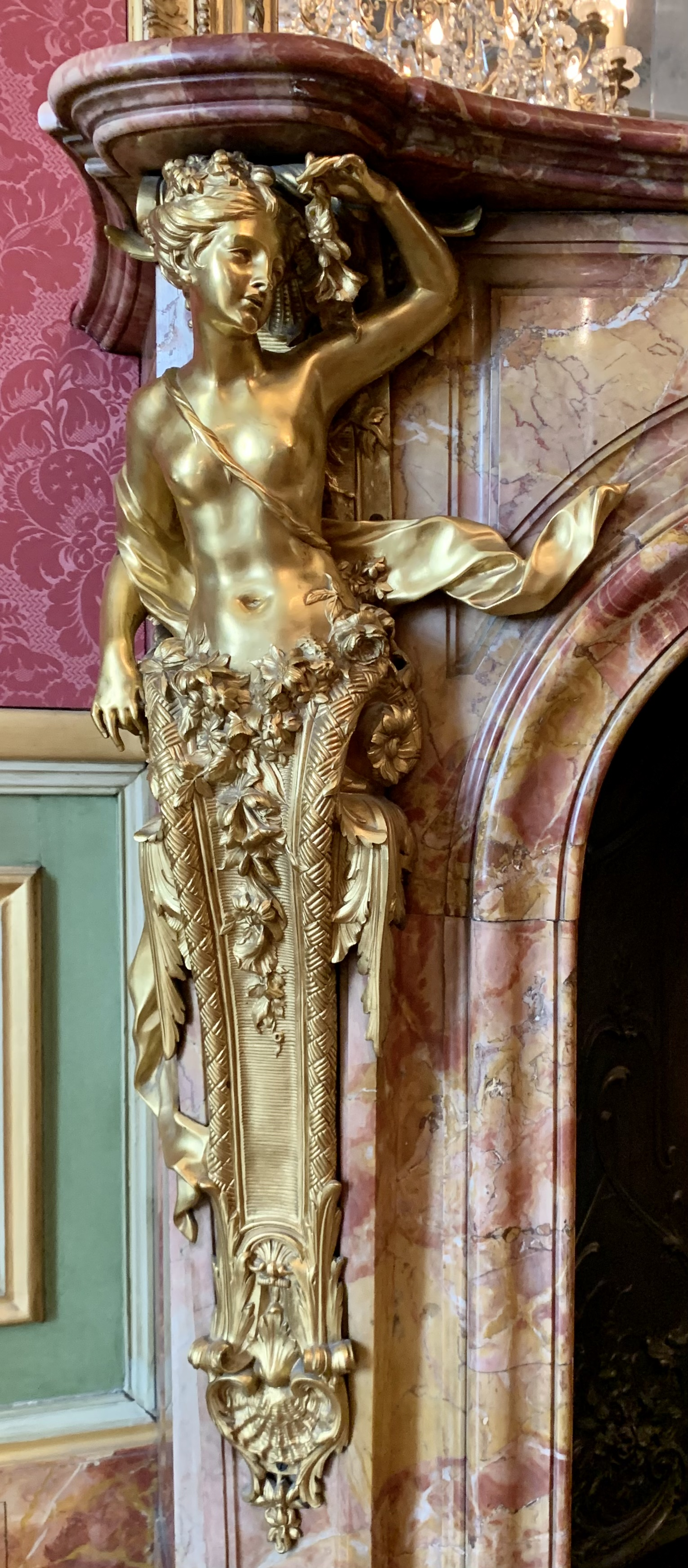
A caryatid in Room 538 of the Louvre, Paris, France

The acroterion atop the Saigon Opera House (1900) in what is now Ho Chi Minh City, Vietnam

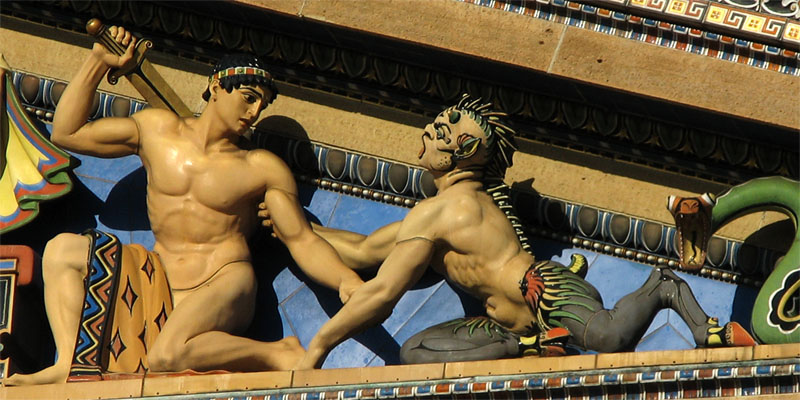
Detail of the 1933 pediment of the Philadelphia Museum of Art in the United States featuring polychrome sculptures of Theseus (left) slaying the Minotaur.

=== Religious and mythological art ===
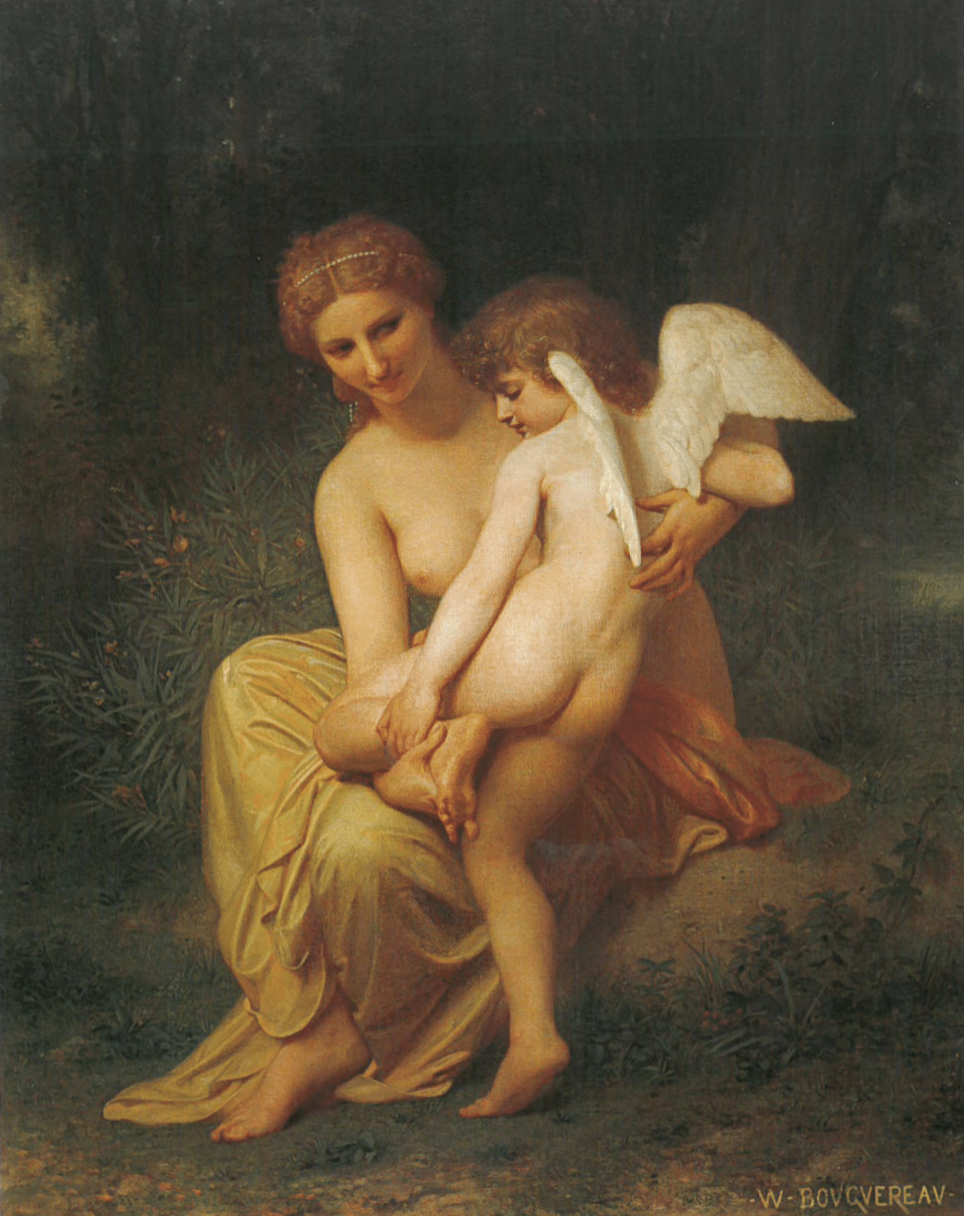
Wounded Cupid (1857) by William-Adolphe Bouguereau. Aphrodite (Venus) and Eros (Cupid), mother and son, are typically portrayed in the nude.

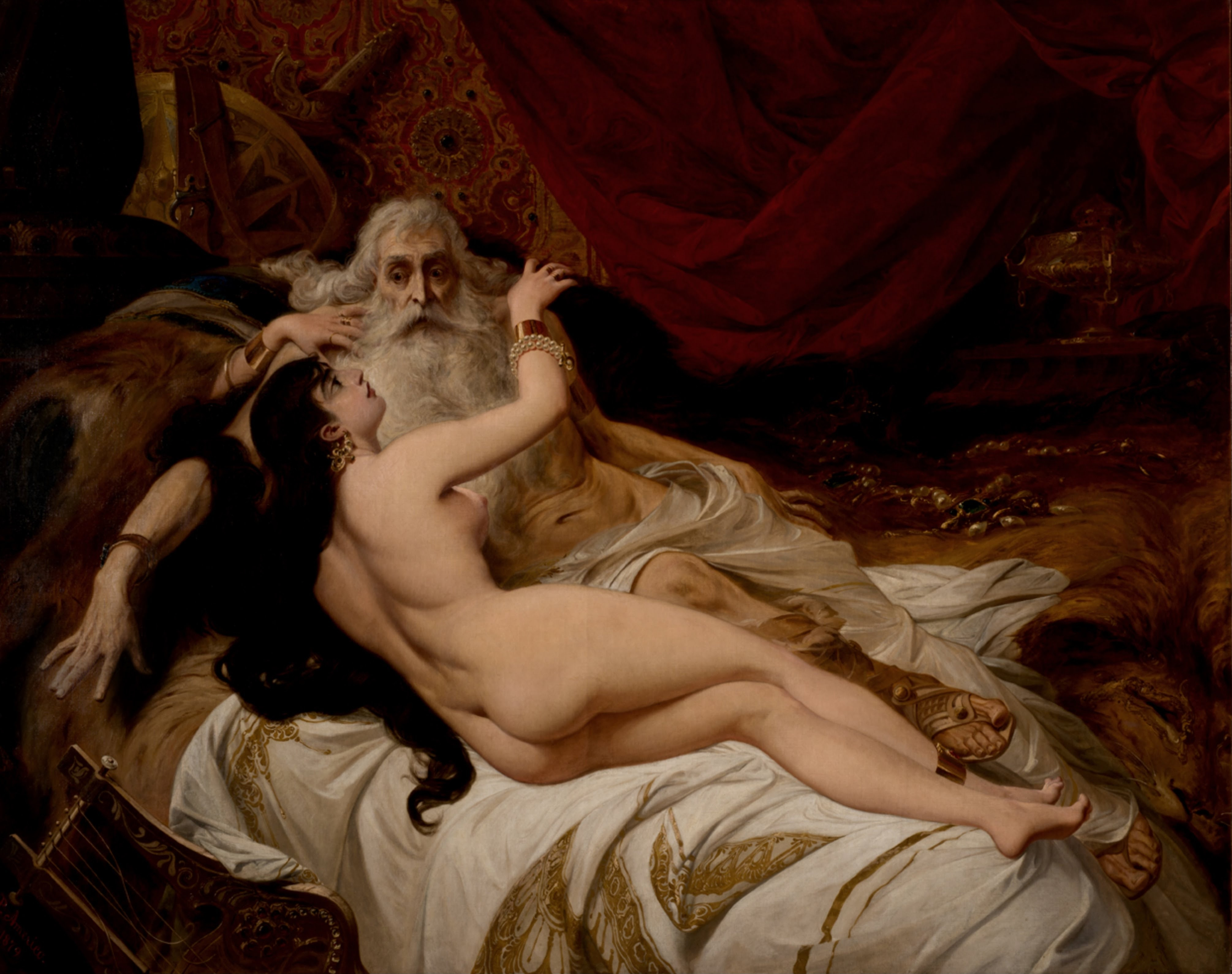
David and Abishag (1879) by Pedro Américo, depicting a story from the Hebrew Bible. Abishag was a servant of King David.

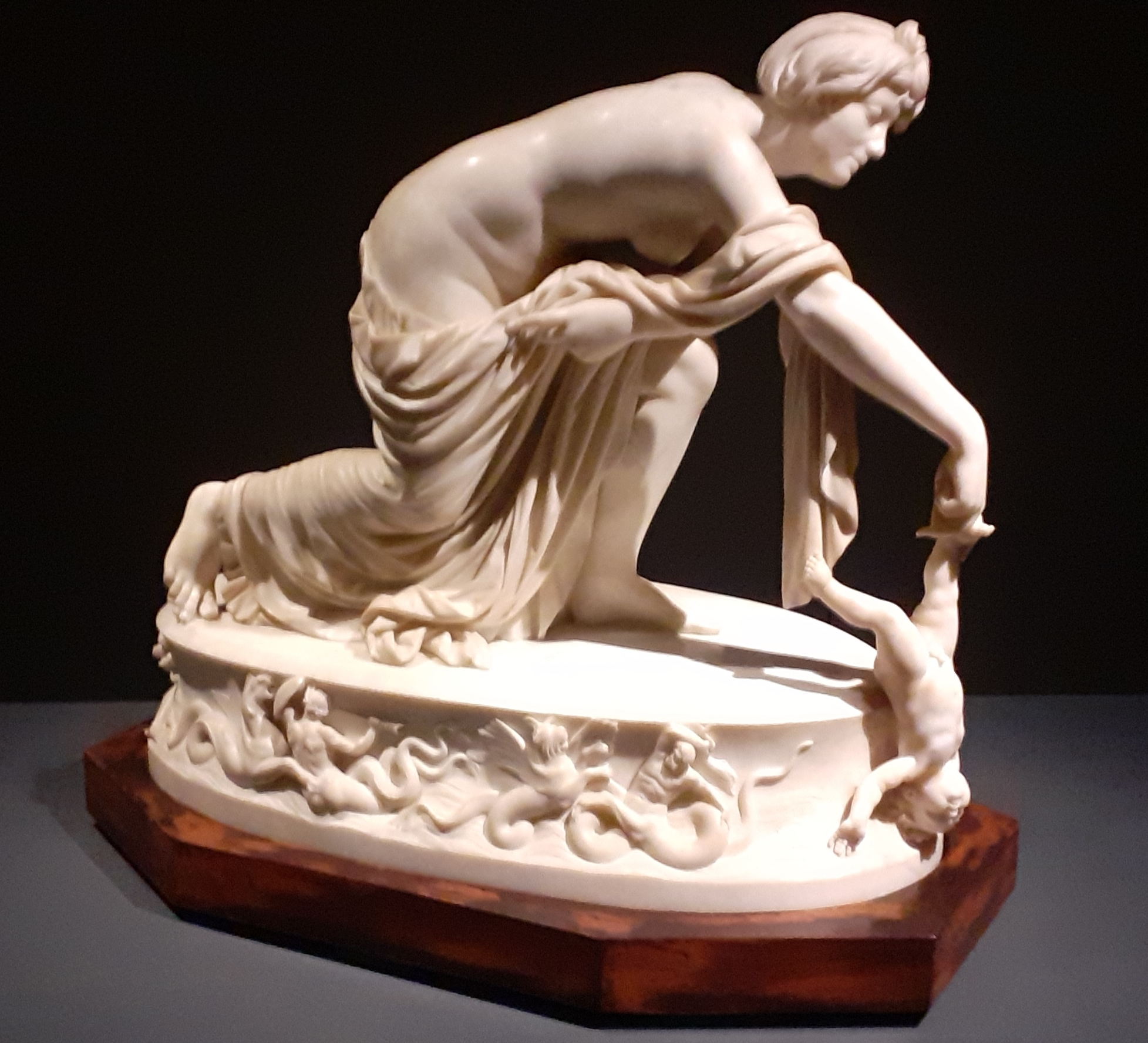
Thetis Dipping Achilles into the River Styx (1789) by Thomas Banks. This marble sculpture depicts a famous scene from Greek mythology.

Where as the ancient Greeks an Romans thought of the human body as a source of pride, a gift from the Olympian gods, medieval European Christians considered it to be a source of shame and viewed it with suspicion and disgust, with the notable exception of Adam and Eve, typically depicted in the nude as flawed beings before Almighty God. Nevertheless, Christianity was unable to completely erase pagan influences in Europe. By the Renaissance, interest in classical civilization was revived, and Greek mythology served as an inspiration for a plethora of artworks, notably, The Birth of Venus by Sandro Botticelli. Moreover, the Judeo-Christian tradition has itself inspired a number of nude sculptures and paintings, featuring humanity as a central creation of God.

=== Depictions of youth ===
For centuries, art has portrayed child nudity as a symbol of youthful innocence, freedom, and vulnerability entirely devoid of its modern pedophilic connotations. This symbolism existed in depictions of daily life along with pagan and Christian iconography depicting Cupid and angels as nude boys. Artists portrayed clothing as a symbol of the burdens of everyday life and viewed undressing as a liberating act that stripped away everyday identities for a brief moment of pure freedom.

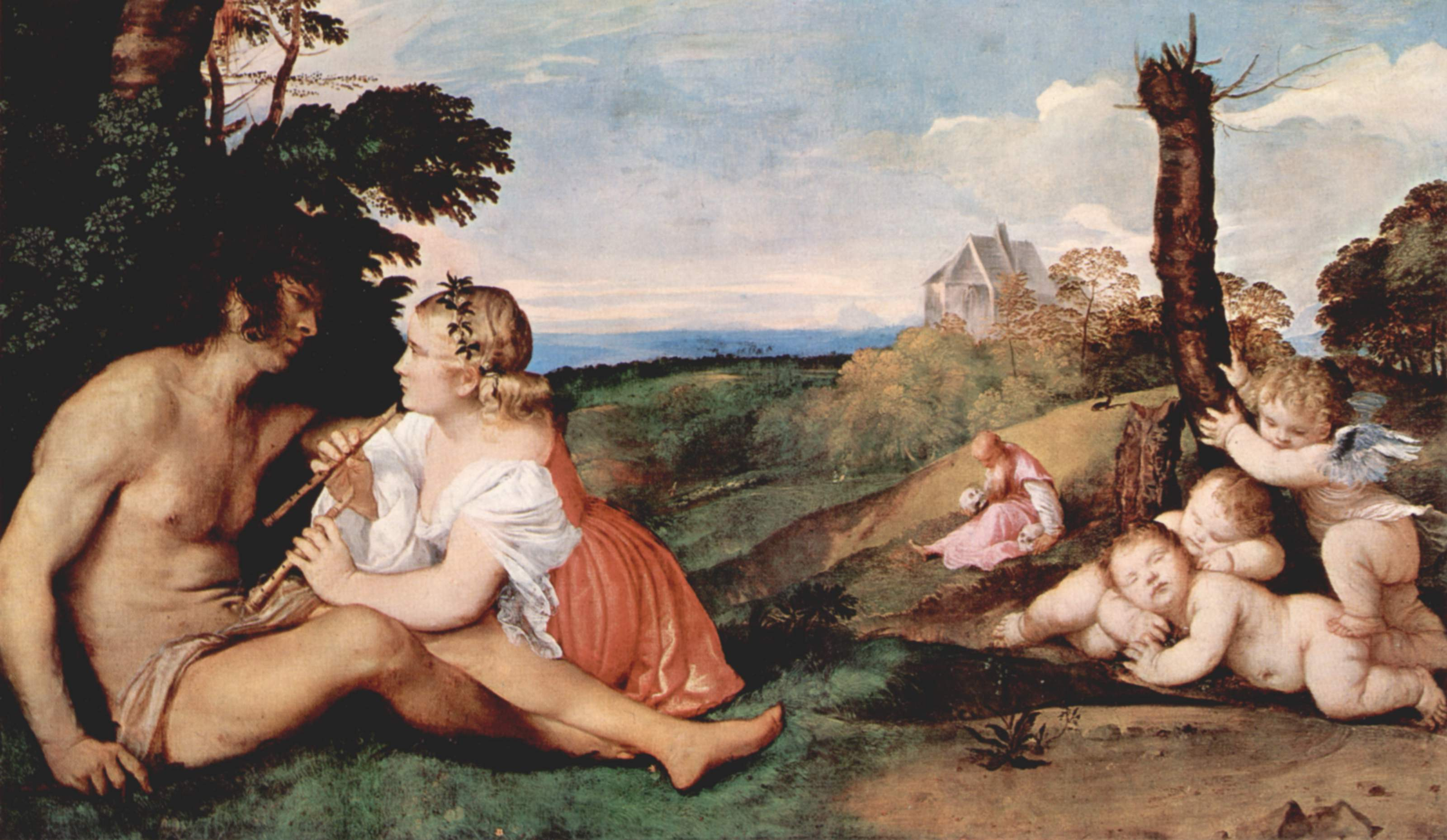
The Three Ages of Man (c. 1512–1514) by Titian

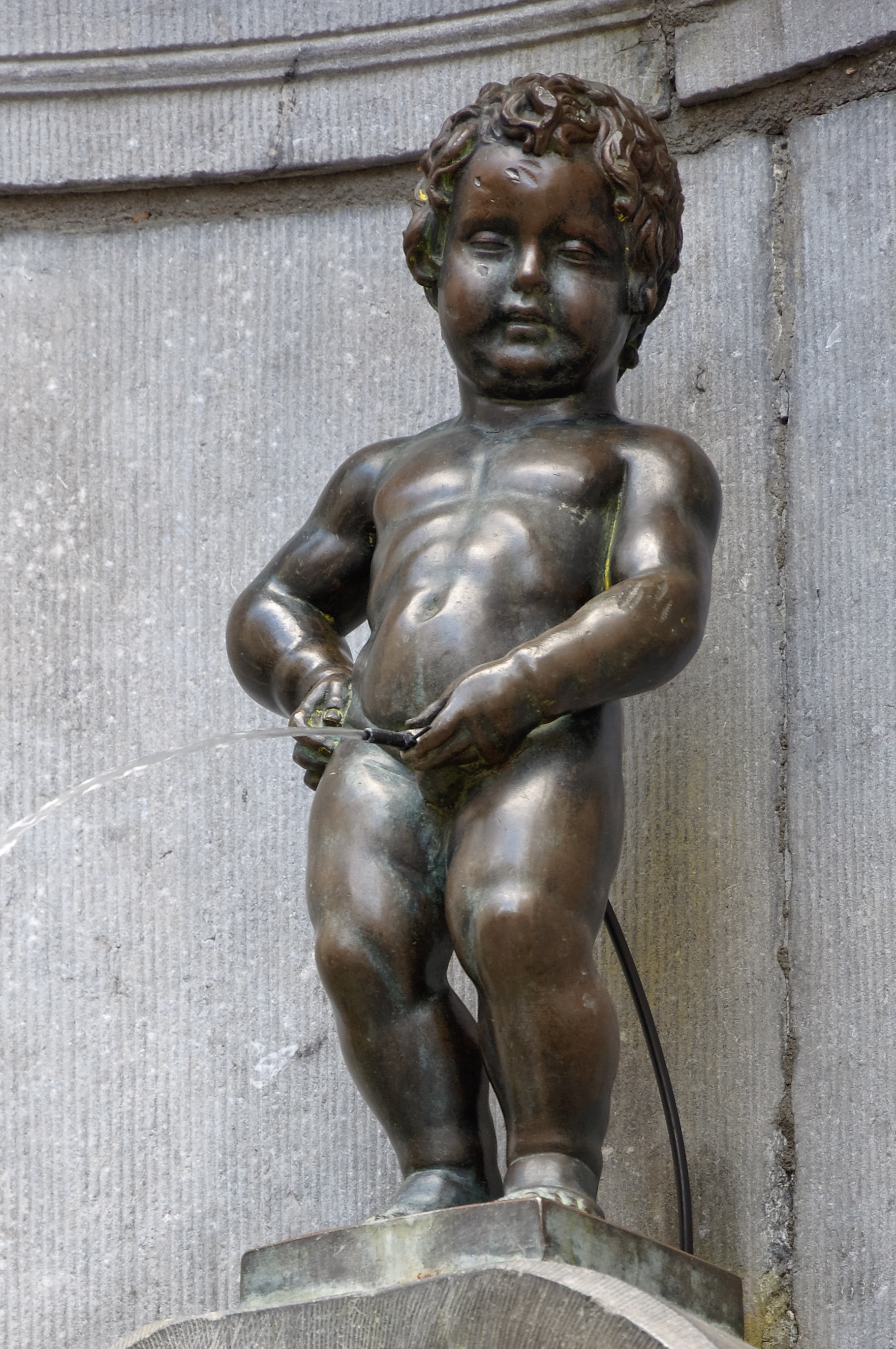
Manneken Pis in Brussels, Belgium.

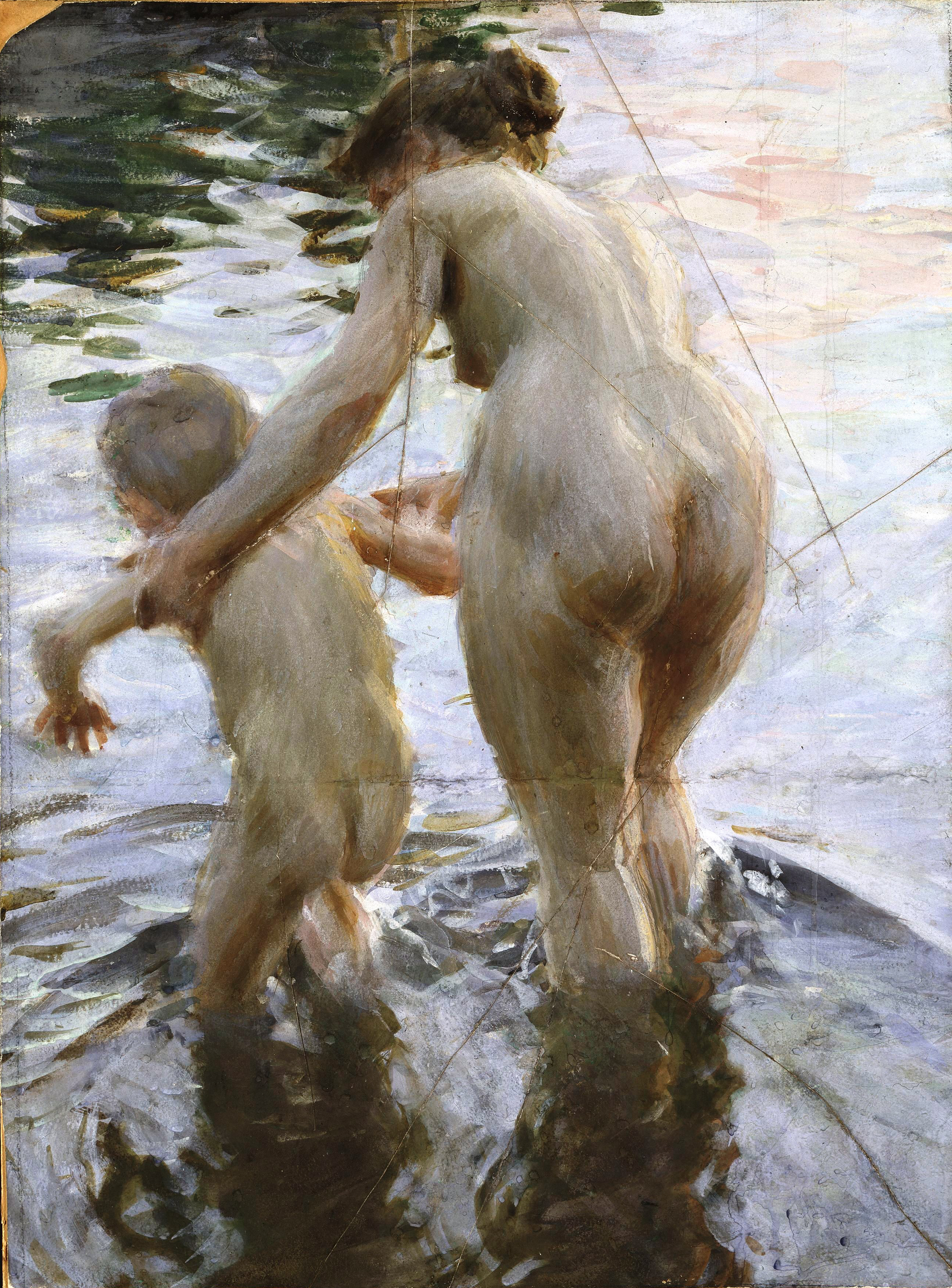
The First Time (1888) by Anders Zorn

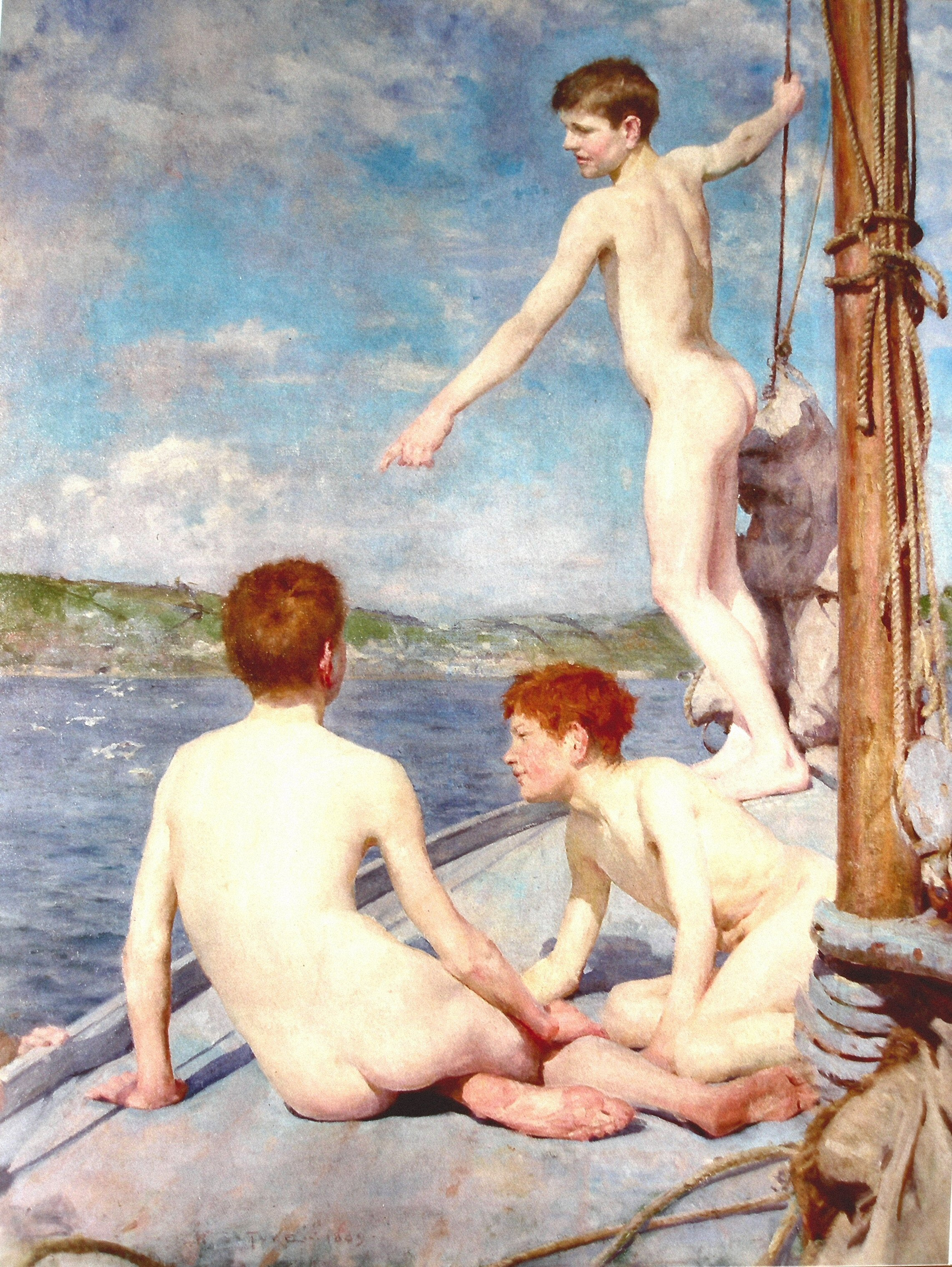
The Bathers (1889) by Henry Scott Tuke

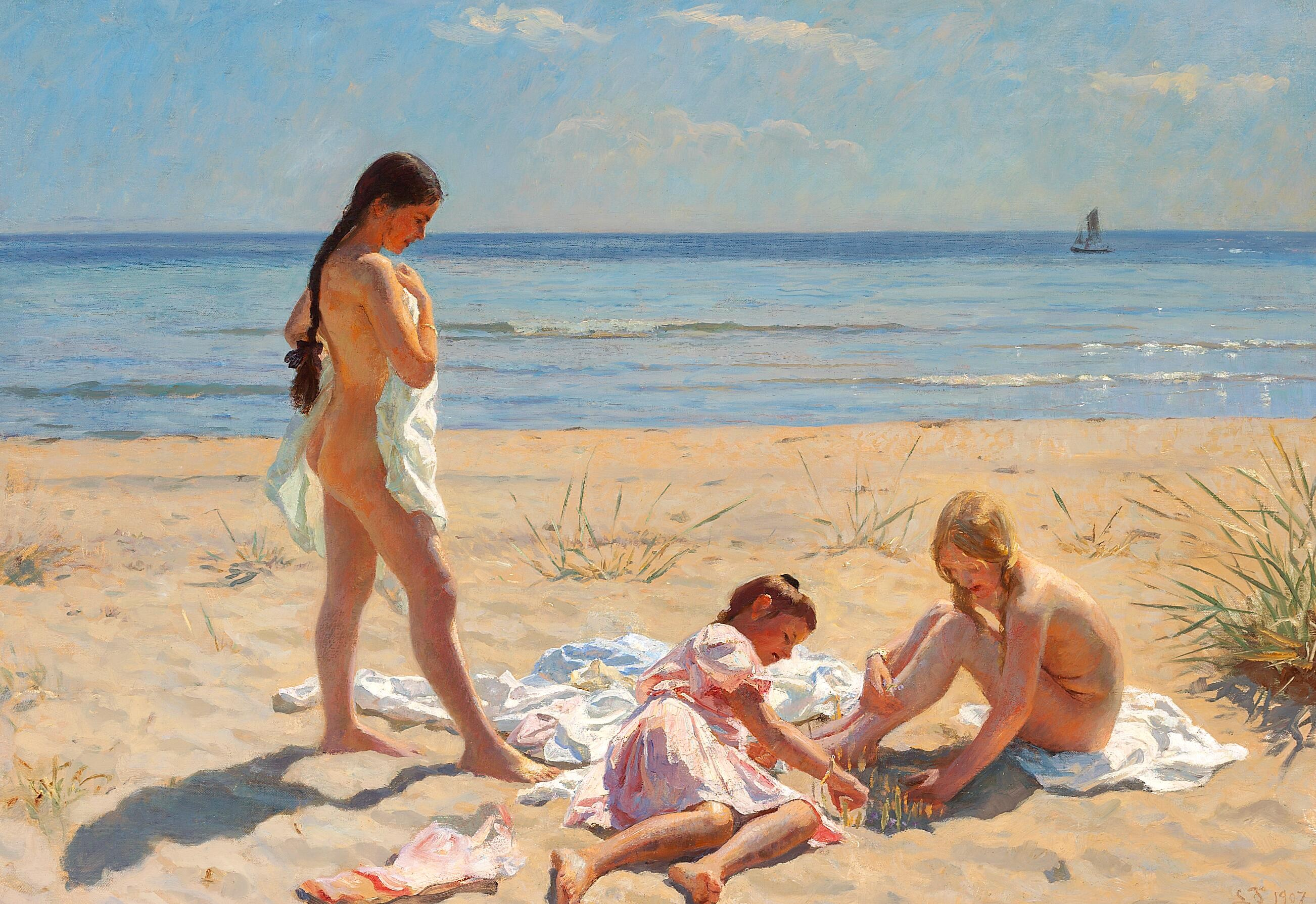
Summer Day at the Beach of Skagen (1907) by Laurits Tuxen

The sculptures Manneken Pis and Jeanneke Pis in Brussels respectively show a nude boy and a nude girl urinating into a fountain below. The original bronze statue was created by Jérôme Duquesnoy the Elder in 1619. Artists such as Mary Cassatt painted mothers bathing and clothing nude children. Until the 20th century, nude swimming existed as a socially acceptable activity for boys in most cultures, leading to frequent artistic representations in photography and paintings. Child nudity remains common in various cultures within the Global South, leading to visitors photographing local children in the nude.

In developed countries, professional photographers such as Will McBride, Jock Sturges, Sally Mann, David Hamilton, and Jacques Bourboulon have photographed children at naturist events and published their work in newspapers, books, magazines, and art galleries. However, these photographs have generated controversy among critics who view such works as a form of child pornography involving subjects who may have experienced psychological harm during or after their creation, regardless of parental consent. Authorities investigated Jock Sturges and David Hamilton following public condemnation of their work by activists such as Randall Terry, but several attempts to prosecute them and booksellers selling their works have been dropped or thrown out of court.

Snapshots taken by parents of their infant or toddler children bathing or otherwise naked have also been destroyed or turned over to law enforcement as child pornography. Lynn Powell describes the prosecution of such cases as a moral panic involving false allegations of child sexual abuse.

=== Colonialism ===
Many precolonial cultures inhabiting tropical and subtropical regions of the world practiced full or partial nudity without any connotation of sexuality. In the nineteenth century, Orientalism sexualized nude women from non-Western cultures through an ethnocentric misinterpretation of their lack of clothing as a form of immodesty. Sexualized depictions of nude women in French postcards and harems escaped legal sanctions as ethnography. Modern activists such as Andrea Smith frequently criticize the sexualization and objectification of Indigenous women as a form of racism and sexism that contributes to ongoing violence against women of color.

== Nude photography ==
Photography has been used to create images of nudity that fit into any category; artistic, educational, commercial, and erotic. In the artistic case, nude photography is a fine art because it is focused aesthetics and creativity; any erotic interest, though often present, is secondary. This distinguishes nude photography from both glamour photography and pornographic photography. The distinction between these is not always clear, and photographers tend to use their own judgment in characterizing their own work, though viewers may disagree. The nude remains a controversial subject in all media, but more so with photography due to its inherent realism. The male nude has been less common than the female, and more rarely exhibited.

Alfred Cheney Johnston (1885–1971) was a professional American photographer who often photographed Ziegfeld Follies showgirls, such as Virginia Biddle. During the First World War, nude images of Fernande by the photographer Jean Agélou were cherished by soldiers on both sides, even though these were illegal and had to be handled with discretion.

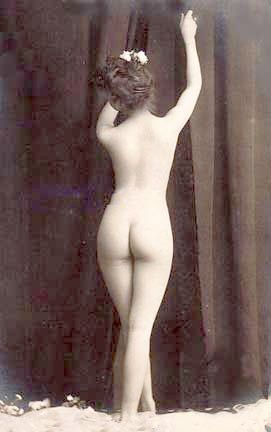
Photograph of the back of a woman with an hourglass figure (c. 1900)

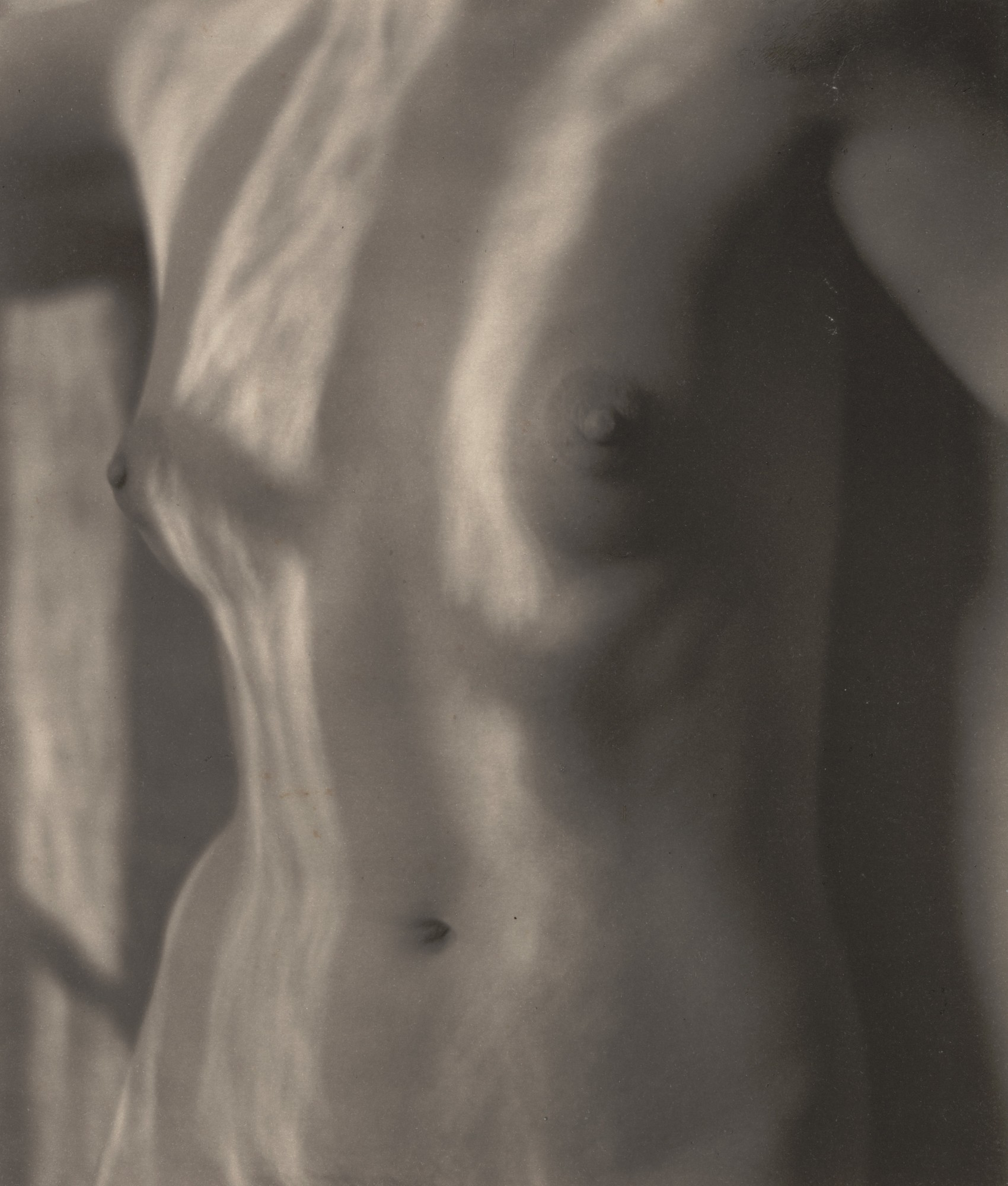
Refracted Sunlight on Torso (1922) by Edward Weston

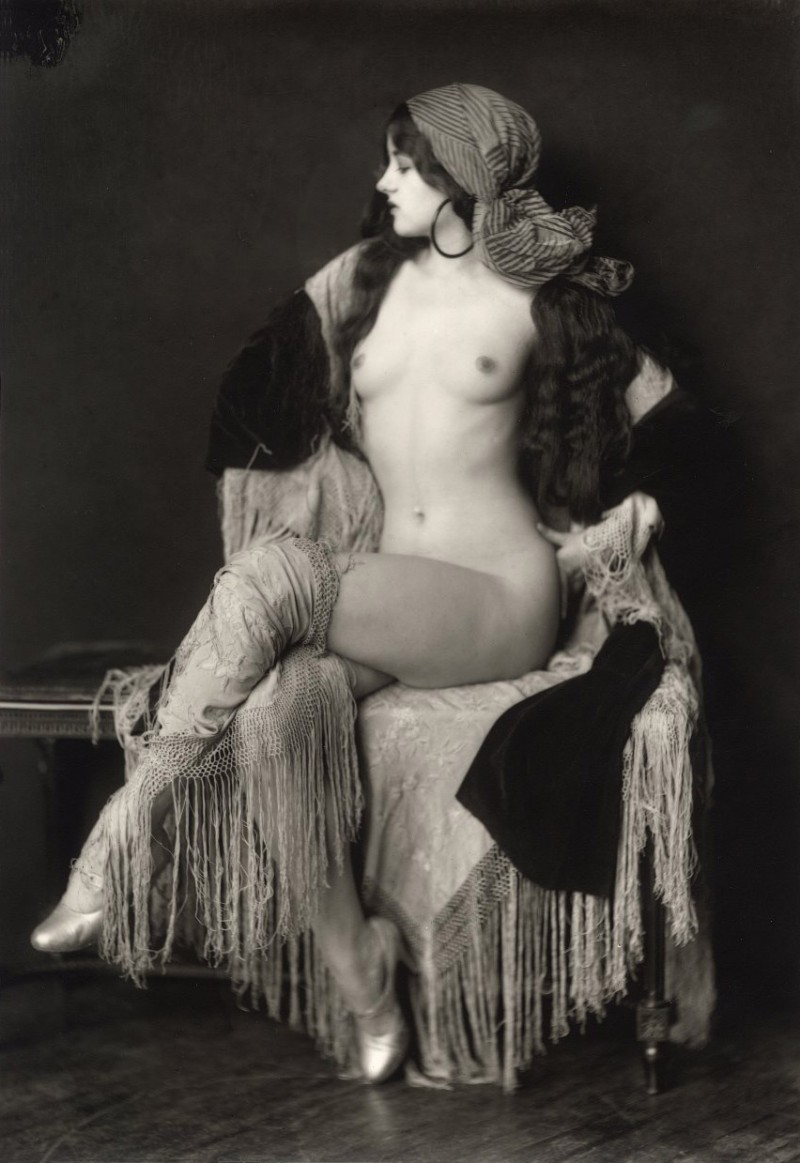
Virginia Biddle (1927) by Alfred Cheney Johnston

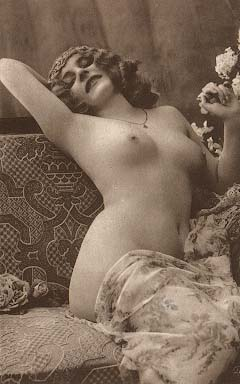
One of the many photographs of Fernande by Jean Agélou (1910s)

Male naked bodies were not pictured as frequently at the time. An exception is the photograph of the early bodybuilder Eugen Sandow modelling the statue The Dying Gaul, illustrating the Grecian Ideal which he introduced to bodybuilding.

== Popular culture ==
=== Classifications and disputes ===
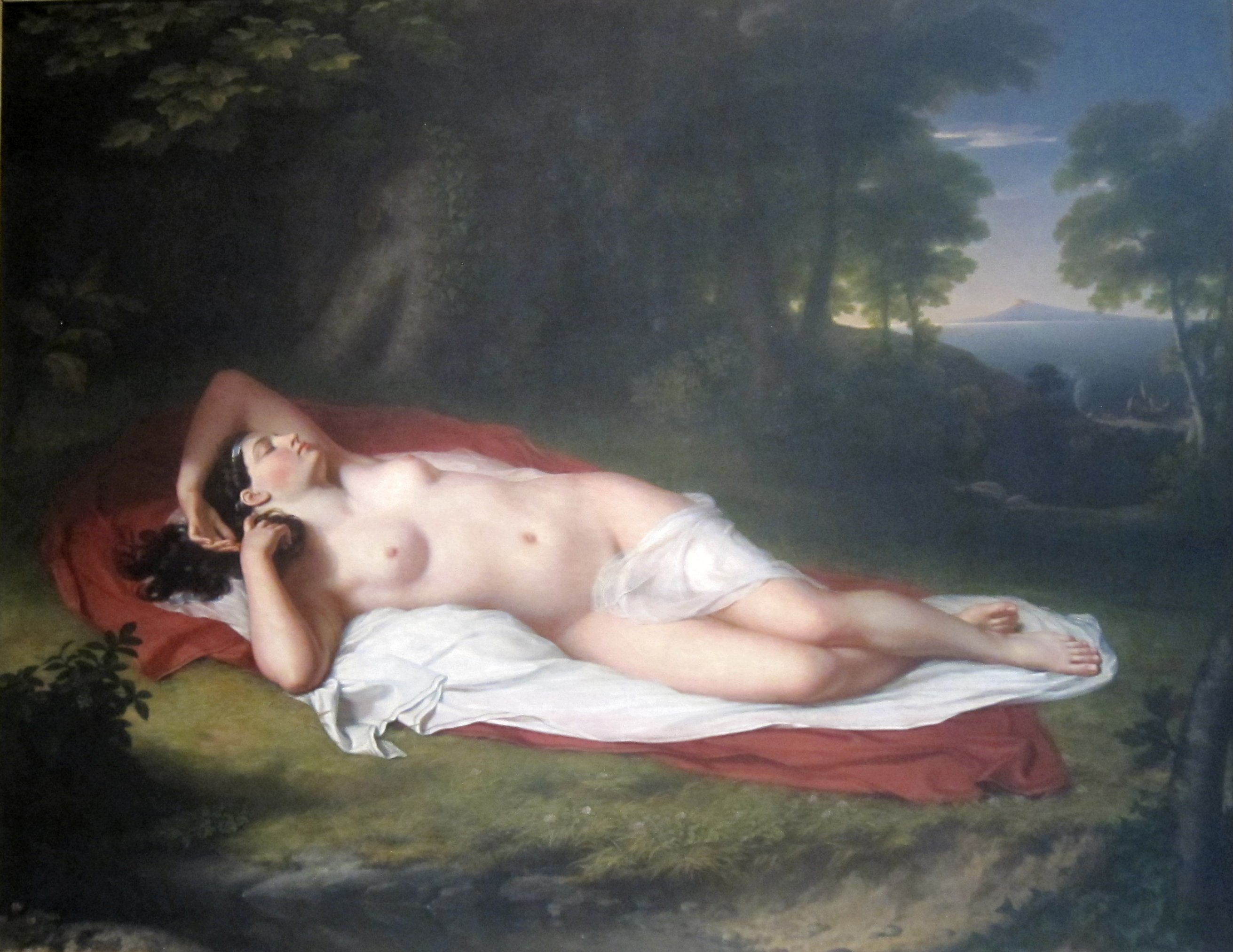
Ariadne Asleep on the Island of Naxos (1808–1812) by John Vanderlyn. The painting was initially considered too sexual for display in the Pennsylvania Academy of the Fine Arts. "Although nudity in art was publicly protested by Americans, Vanderlyn observed that they would pay to see pictures of which they disapproved."

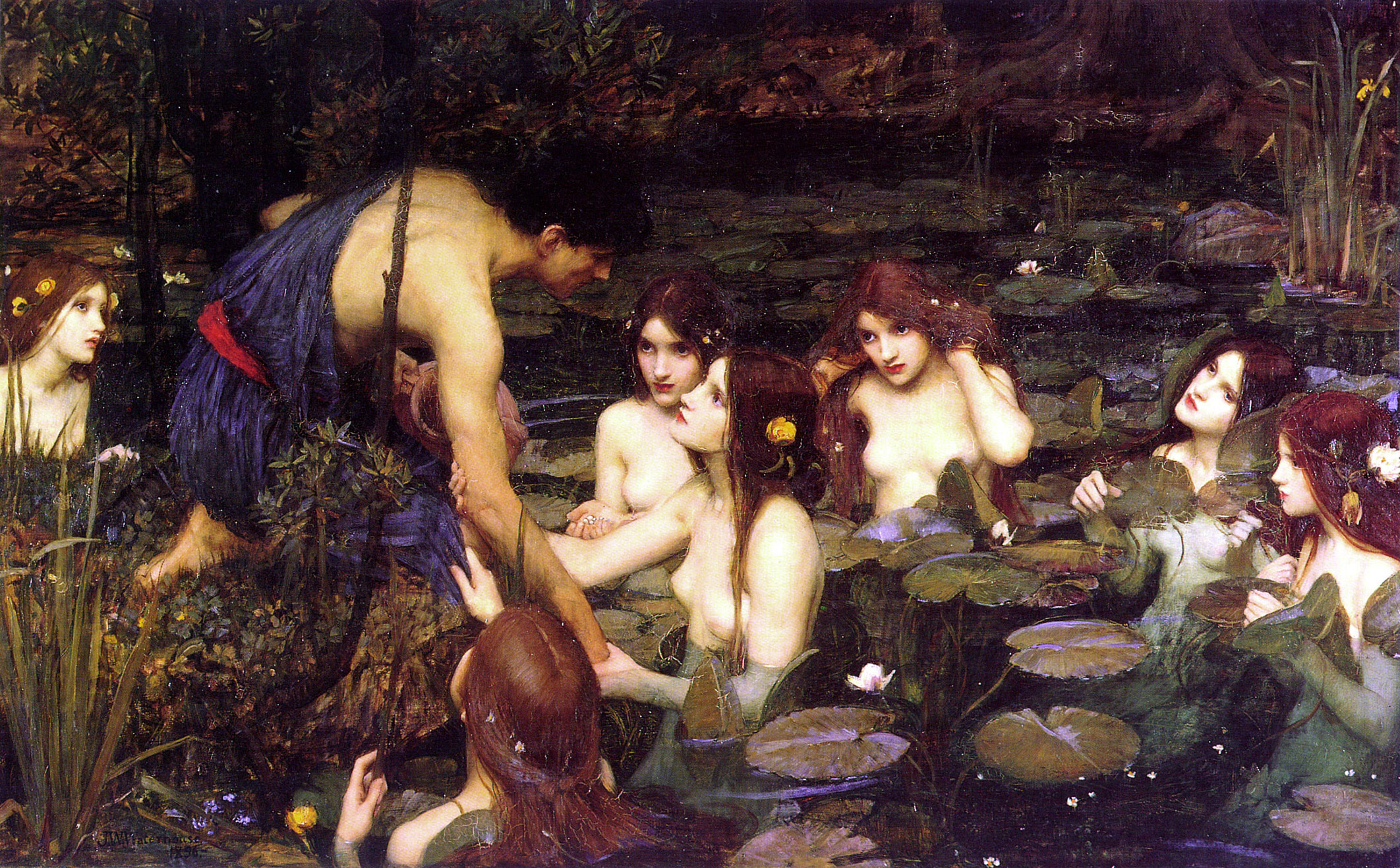
The decision to temporarily remove the painting Hylas and the Nymphs (1896) by John William Waterhouse from public display at the Manchester Art Gallery due concerns over the objectification of women was poorly received by the general public.

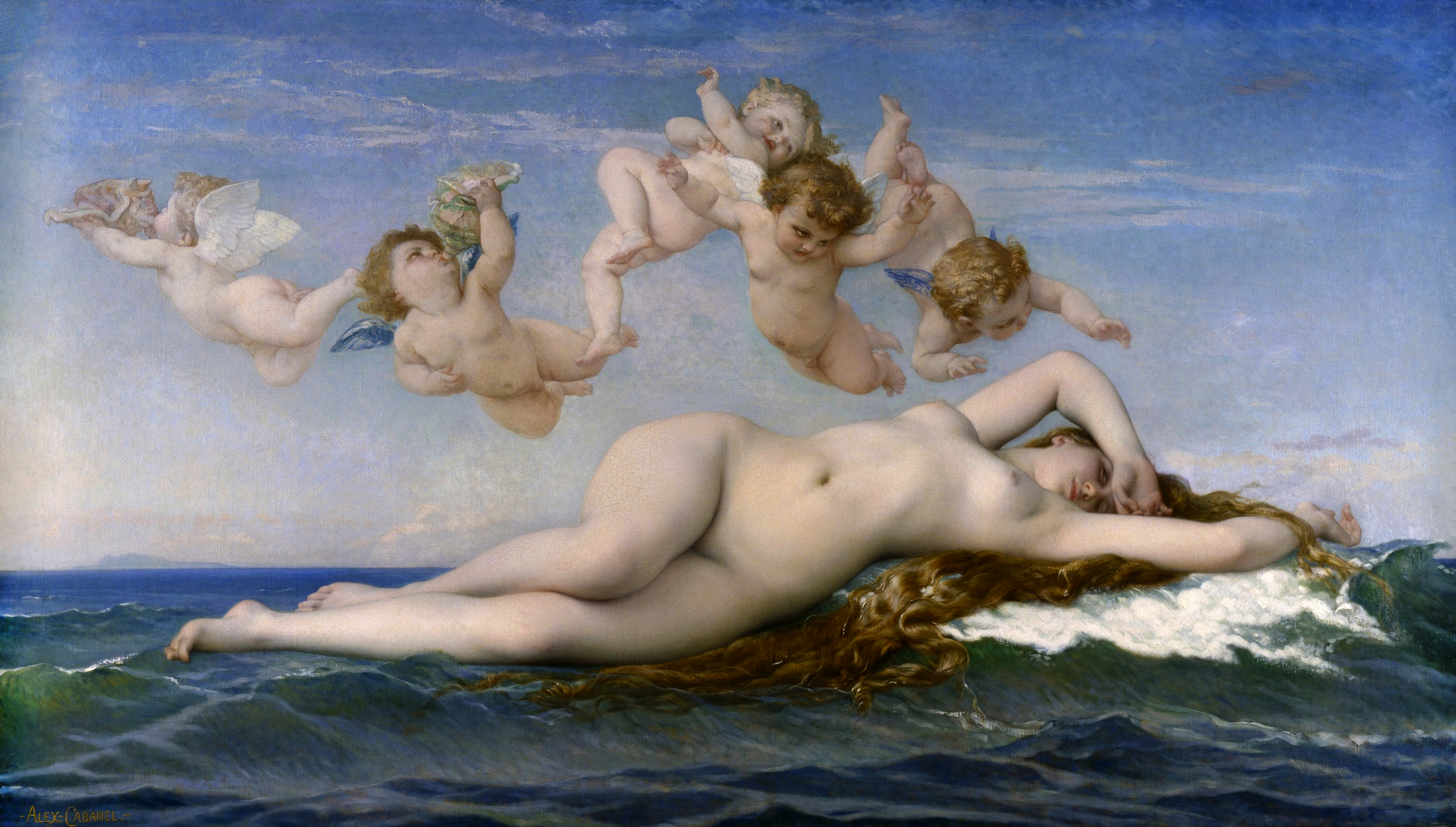
The Birth of Venus (1863) by Alexandre Cabanel. Fine arts in the West have traditionally omitted pubic hair.

With the expansion of the display of nudity in art beyond traditional galleries, some exhibitions experience backlash from individuals who equate all nudity with sexuality, and thus inappropriate for viewing by the general public or schoolchildren in art class. In exceptional cases, even well-known artworks, such as the statue David (of the Biblical David) by Renaissance master Michelangelo, could stir controversy. On the other hand, the removal of a famous nude painting from public display, however temporary, could cause a mostly condemnatory public reaction. Nude depictions of women may be criticized by feminists as inherently voyeuristic due to the male gaze. Although not specifically anti-nudity, the feminist group Guerrilla Girls point out the prevalence of nude women on the walls of museums but the scarcity of female artists. Without the relative freedom of the fine arts, nudity in popular culture often involves making fine distinctions between types of depictions. The most extreme form is full frontal nudity, referring to the fact that the actor or model is presented from the front and with the genitals exposed. Frequently, though, nude images do not go that far. They are instead deliberately composed, and films edited, such that in particular no genitalia are seen, as if the camera by chance failed to see them. This is sometimes called "implied nudity" as opposed to "explicit nudity." It is in popular culture that a particular image may lead to classification disputes.

Displays of nude artworks in museums may sometimes be a subject of controversy. In response, a museum may showcase only relatively tame statues or paintings, leaving more provocative works to commercial galleries. According to art historian Kenneth Clark, a fine work of art may contain significant sexual content but without being obscene. Art historian and critic Frances Borzello observes that twenty-first-century artists have abandoned the ideals and traditions of the past, choosing instead to create more confronting depictions of the unclothed human body. In the performing arts, then, this means presenting actual naked bodies as works of art.

Whether or not pubic hair is acceptable in art has not been consistent among different cultures and over time. In the West, pubic hair has been typically absent from fine art up until the last few centuries or so, but was rather common in pornography. Today, this trend has been reversed.

=== Activism and advertising ===
Liberty Leading the People (1830) by Eugène Delacroix, restored in 2024

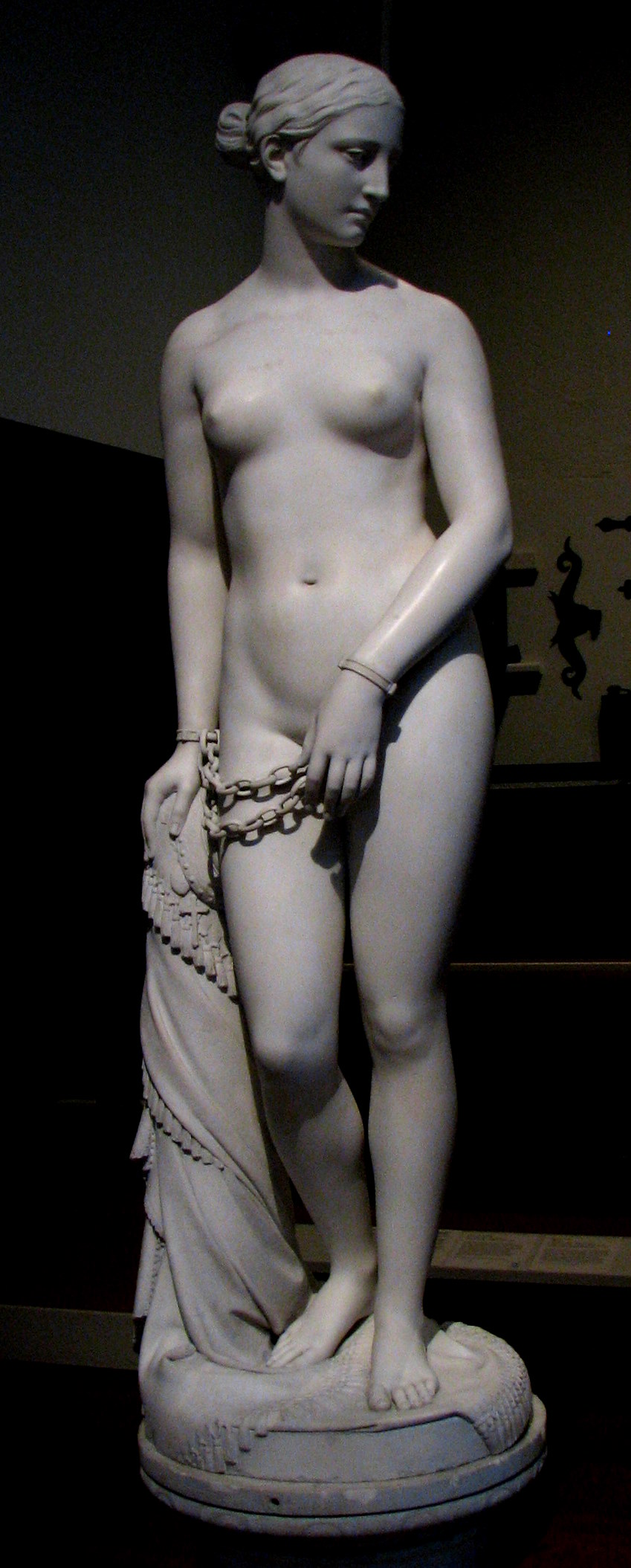
The Greek Slave by Hiram Powers (1851)

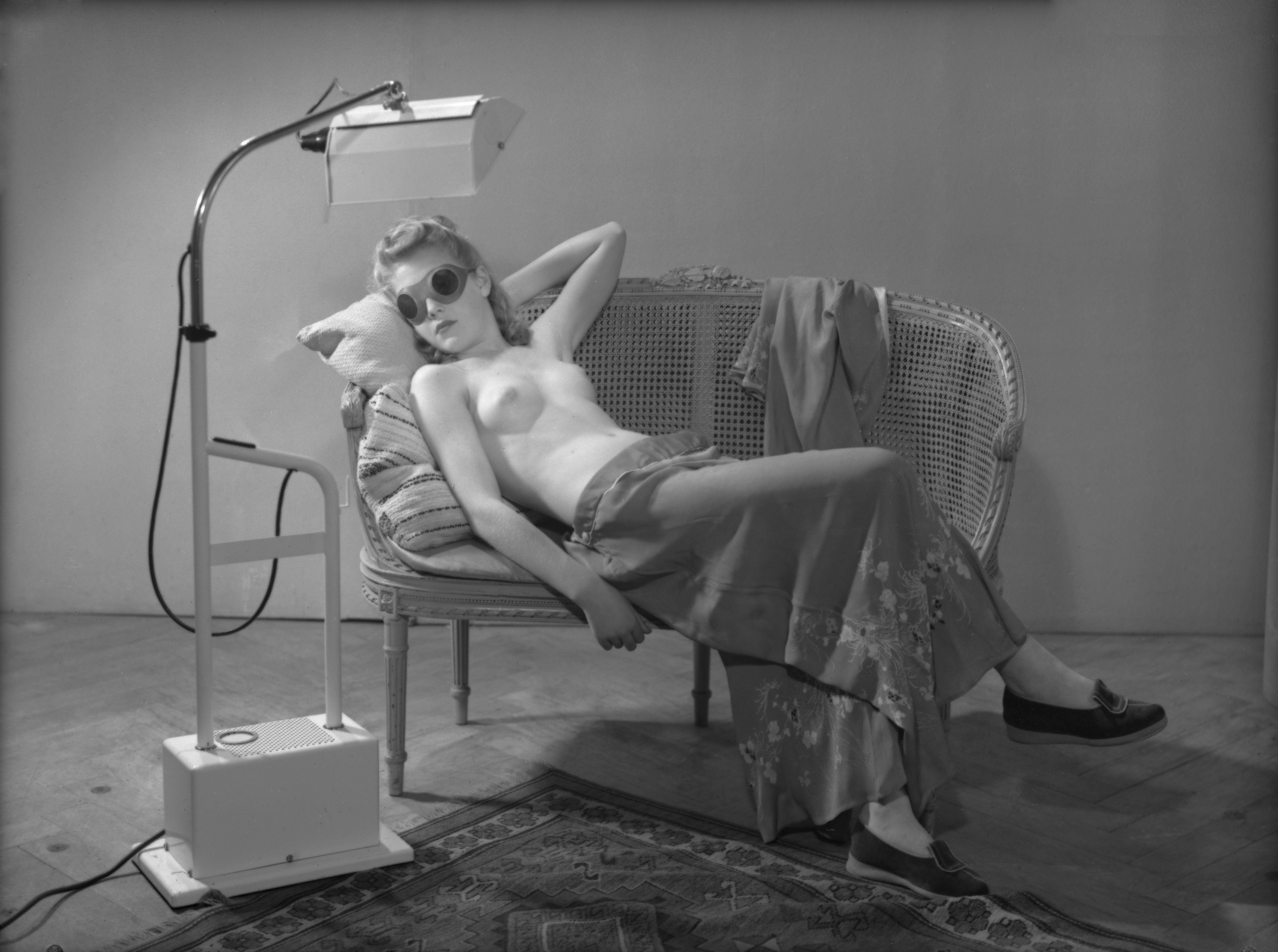
Photograph from an advertisement in the Netherlands for Philips tanning lamps, taken by Maria Antonia Merkelbach (c. 1946)

Liberty Leading the People is an artwork by Romanticist painter Eugène Delacroix commemorating the Revolution of July 1830 in France. It features a partially nude goddess or allegory of liberty, wearing a Phrygian cap that had become the symbol of liberty during the first French Revolution of 1789, holding aloft the French tricolor, and leading citizens from all walks of life to overthrow King Charles X. This painting is sometimes mistakenly believed to portray the French Revolution. It is arguably the best known early depiction Marianne, the personification of the French Republic.

Neoclassical sculptor Hiram Powers earned his fame for The Greek Slave, a statue that not only inspired some poetry, but also the abolitionist and women's rights movements in the United States.

In modern media, images of partial and full nudity are used in advertising to draw attention. In the case of attractive models this attention is due to the visual pleasure the images provide; in other cases it is due to the relative rarity of such images. The use of nudity in advertising tends to be carefully controlled to avoid the impression that a company whose product is being advertised is indecent or unrefined. There are also (self-imposed) limits on what advertising media such as magazines will allow. The success of sexually provocative advertising is used to justify the truism "sex sells"—now commonly accepted and utilized by advertisers. Nevertheless, some cultures (such as France) are more receptive to the use of sexual appeal in advertising than others (such as South Korea). In the United States, responses to nudity has been mixed. Nudity in the advertisements of Calvin Klein, Benetton, and Abercrombie & Fitch, for example, has provoked negative as well as positive responses.

An example of an advertisement featuring male full frontal nudity is one for M7 fragrance. Many magazines refused to place the ad, so there was also a version with a more modest photograph of the same model.

=== Aircraft nose art ===
An air crew may commission or create an artwork located on the fuselage of the aircraft, usually the nose. Nose art may portray largely unclothed or nude women. Examples of nose arts could be dated back to the First World War. But it was not until the Second that this movement truly took off. Nose arts could be found on both Allied and Axis aircraft. Some observers have argued that the Second World War was the golden age for this style of art. However, after the Korean War, a combination of changing public attitudes and military regulations have diminished the number of nose arts. In the United States, for example, the Air Force requires nose arts to be "distinctive, symbolic, gender neutral, intended to enhance unit pride, designed in good taste."

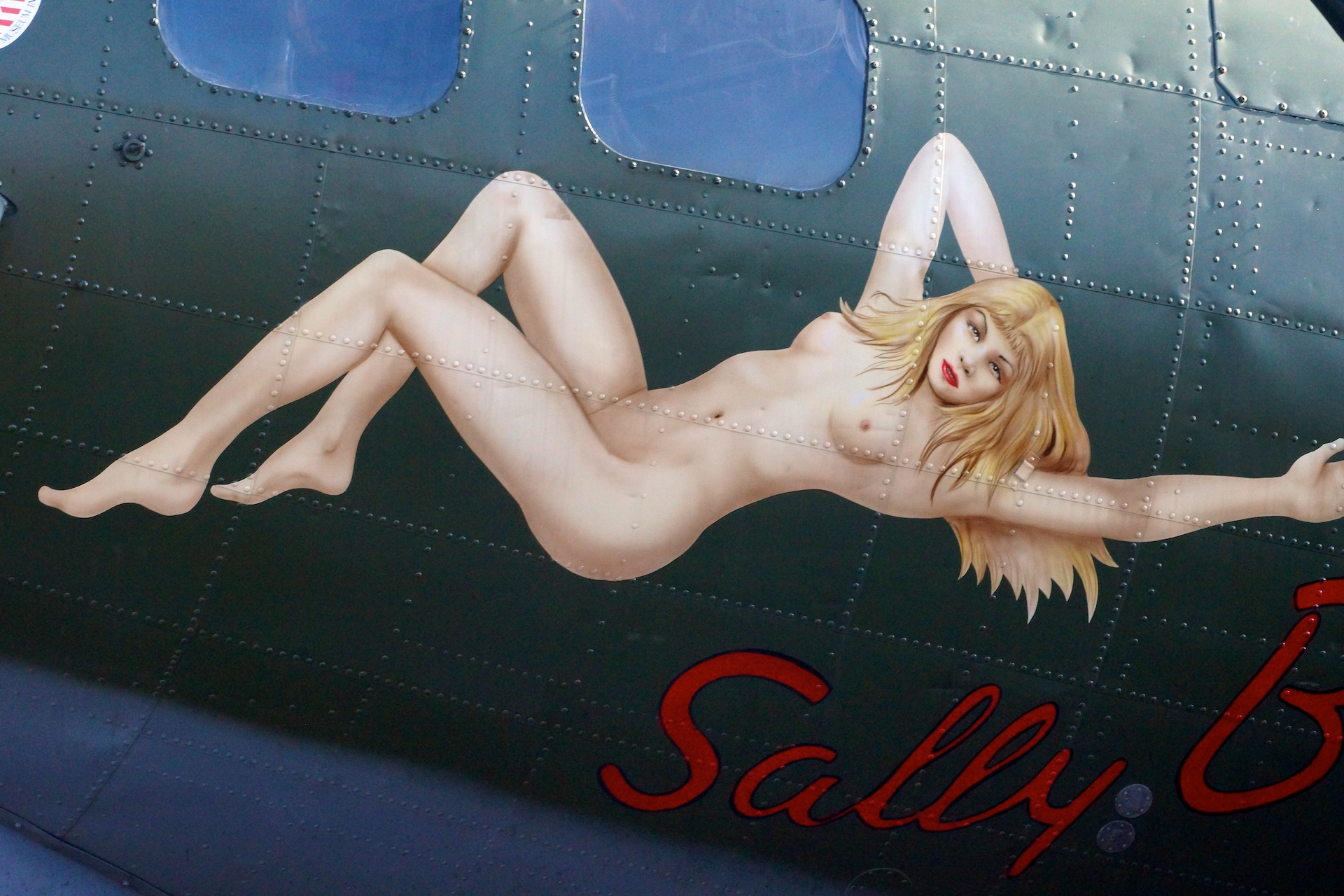
Nose art on a B-17 Flying Fortress of the United States Army Air Forces (USAAF)

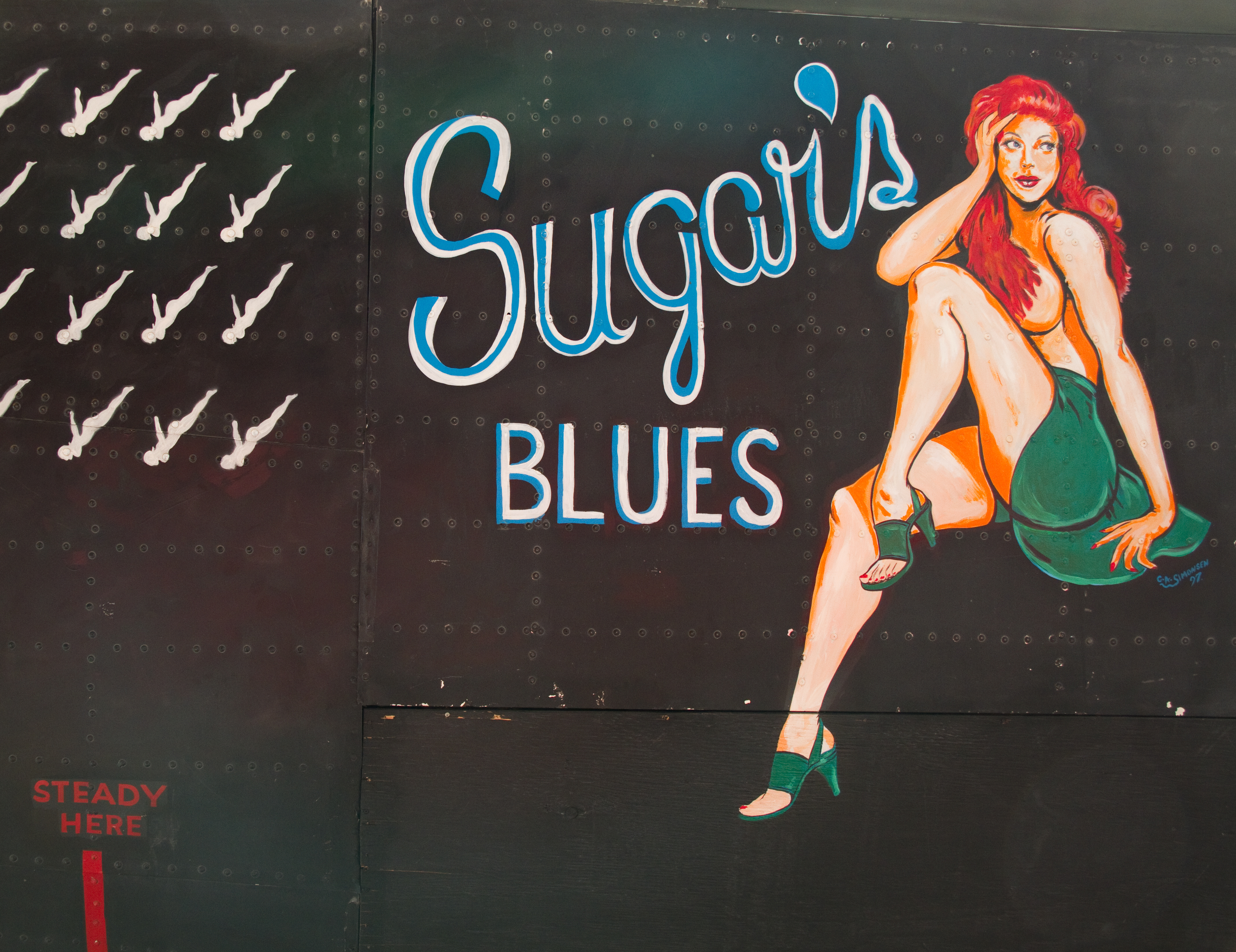
Restored "Sugar's Blues" artwork on an Avro Lancaster of the Royal Canadian Air Force (RCAF)

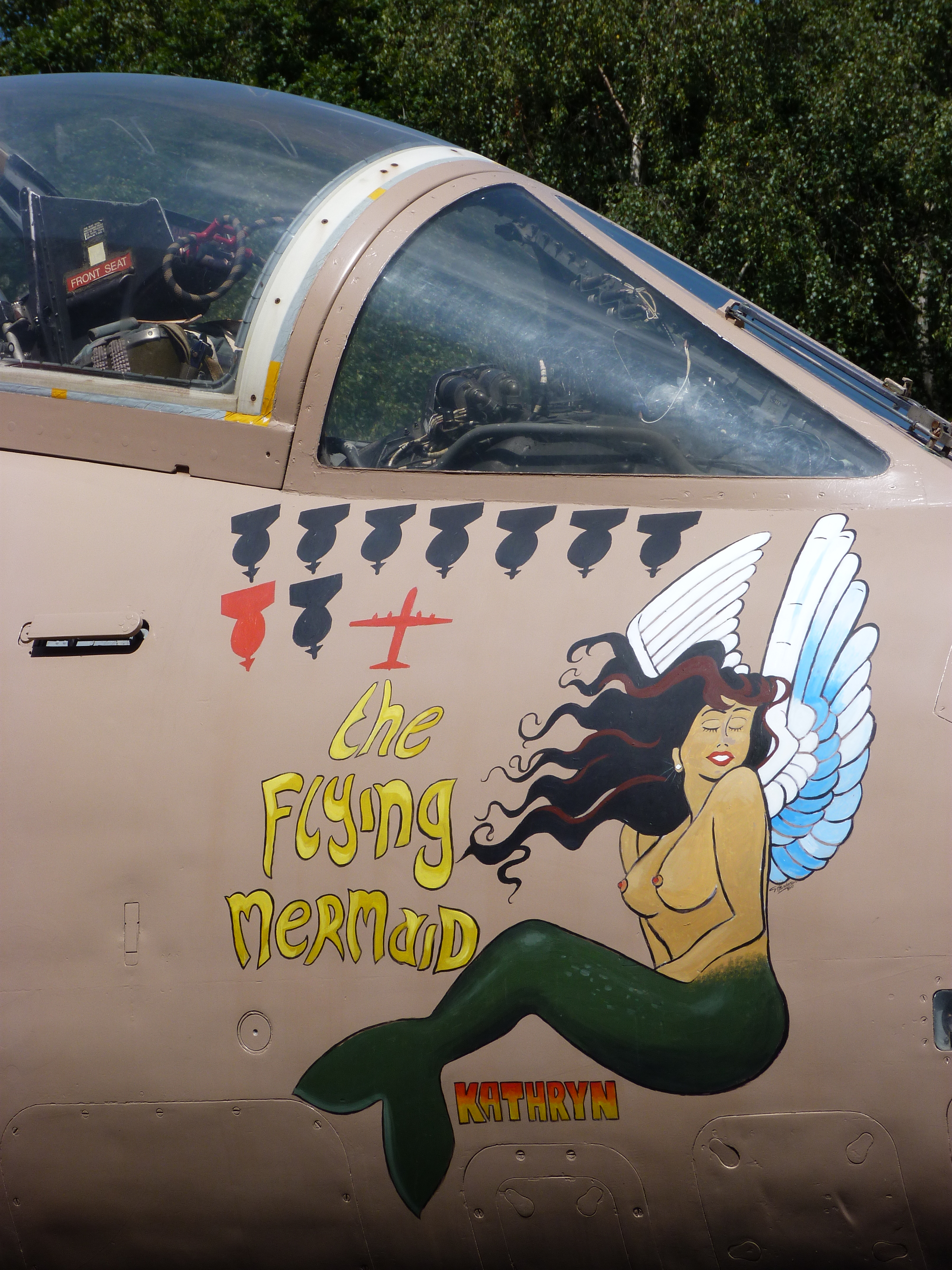
A Blackburn Buccaneer of the Royal Navy (RN) of the United Kingdom with its nose art and victory markings.

=== Calendars and posters ===
In some countries, calendars with nude imagery are available for purchase. In addition, nude calendars might be sold for charity or by an athletic team. In the case of the Orthodox Calendar, the explicit purpose is to combat homophobia. The Pirelli Calendar has historically contained glamour photography, some of which nude. Posters featuring nudity might be commercially available as well.

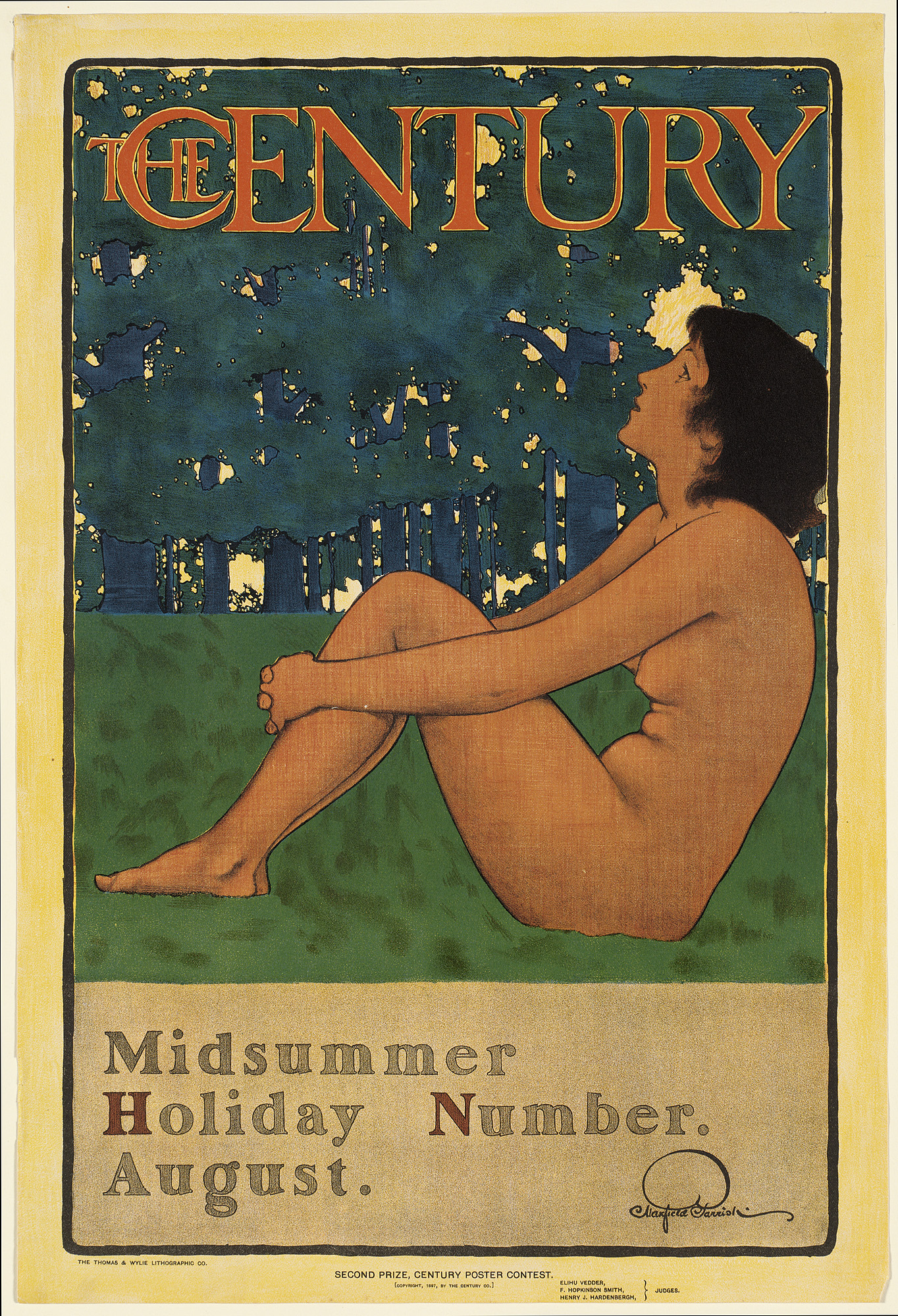
A poster dated 1897 archived by the Boston Public Library

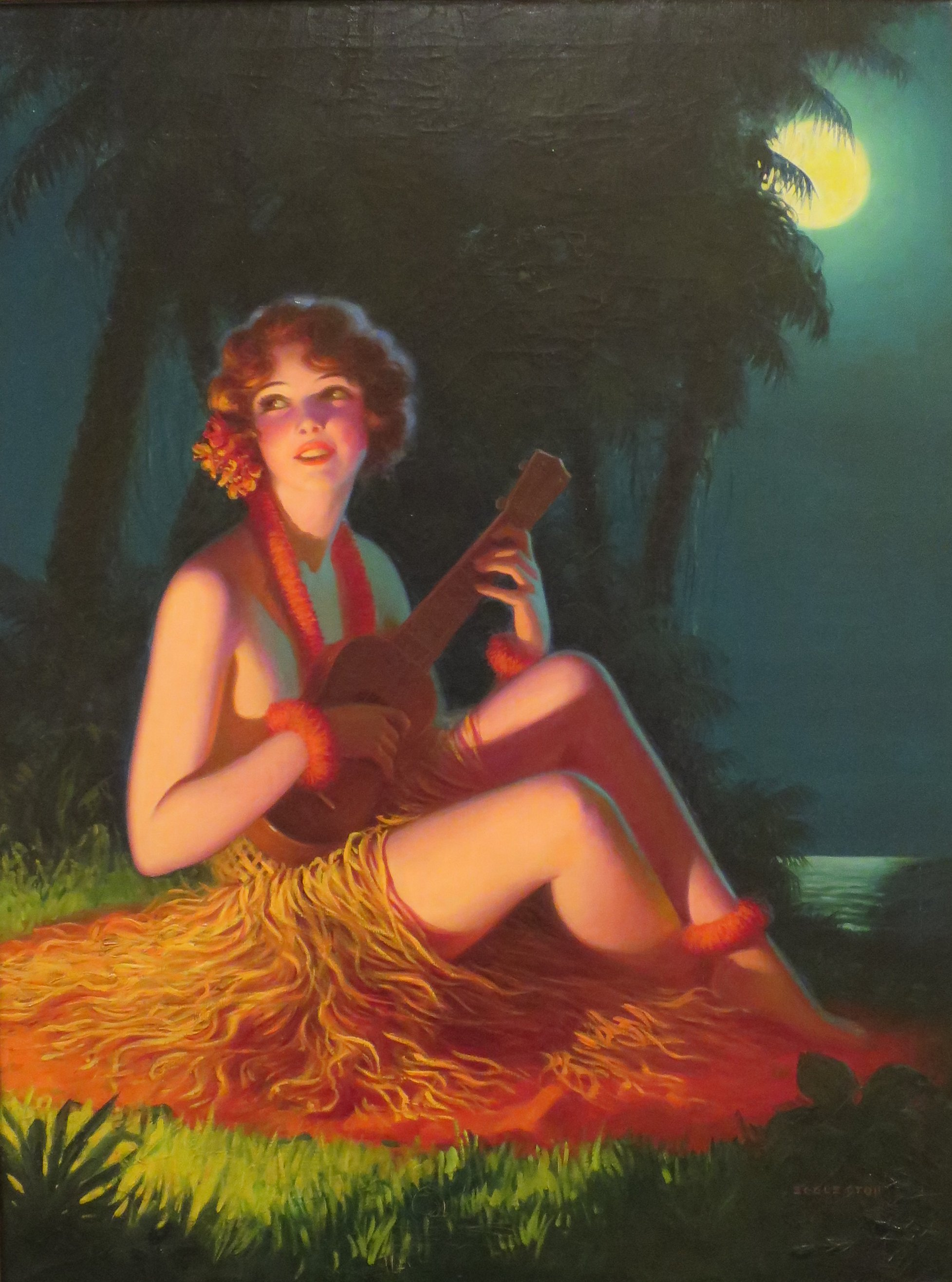
Isle of Dreamy Melodies (1925-30) by Edward Mason Eggleston, published with that name as a calendar print by Brown & Bigelow.

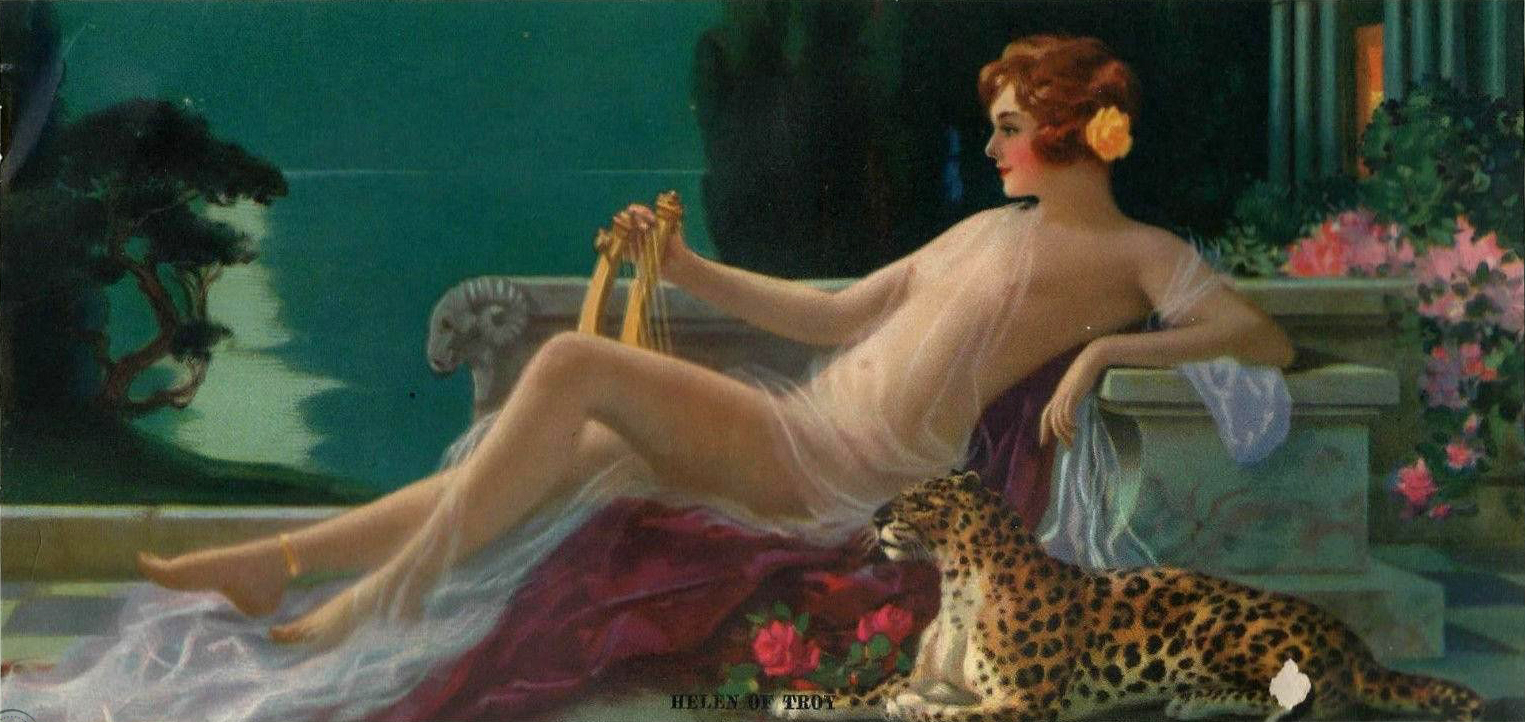
Helen of Troy 1934 calendar print, by Henry Hintermeister

=== Comic books ===
The French graphic novel (bande dessinée) Pyrénée (1998) by Regis Loisel and Philippe Sternis, two French cartoonists, features the titular feral child as a female counterpart to Mowgli in The Jungle Book (1894) by Rudyard Kipling. Le Grand Incident (2023) by Zelba, a German artist, is a work of "rebellion" against the way in which the female human body has traditionally been portrayed in Western art, especially those on display at the Louvre in Paris. It was translated into English by Alice Yang and published with the title Not On Display in 2025.

=== Depictions of public figures ===
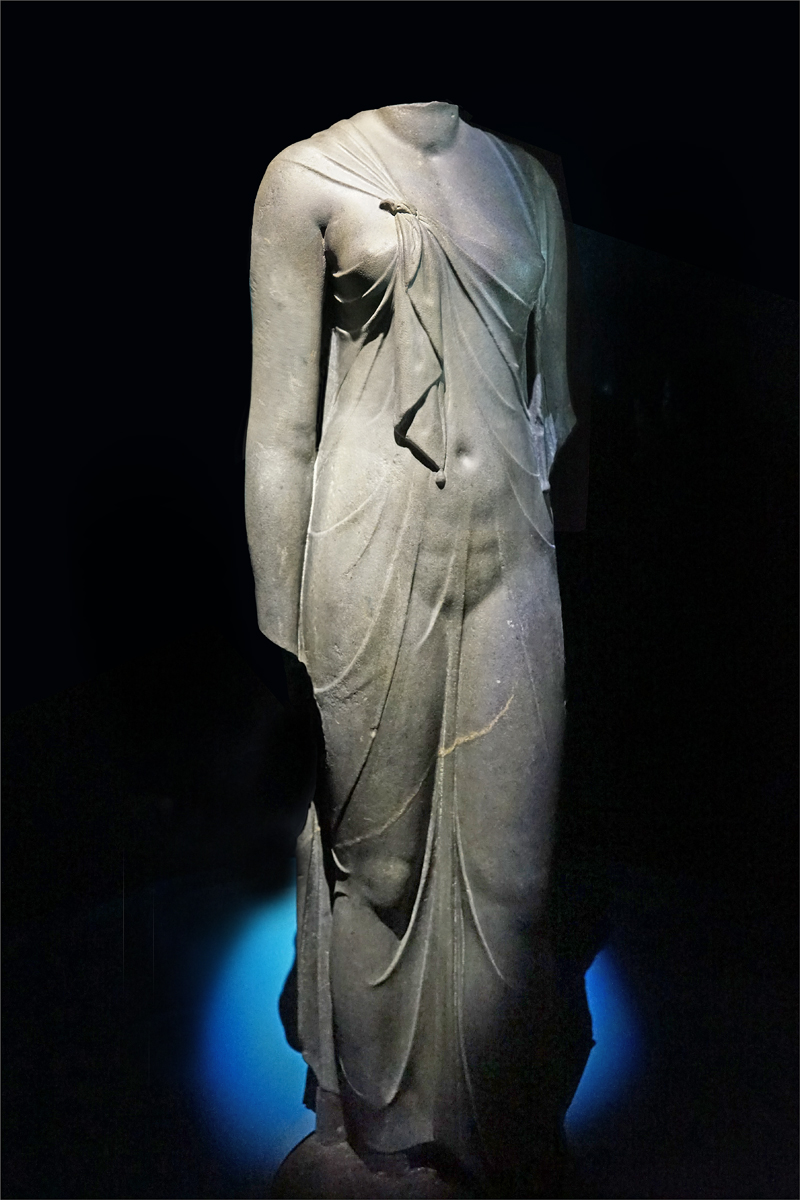
Statue of Queen Arsinoe II of the Ptolemaic Dynasty in Egypt (3rd century B.C.)

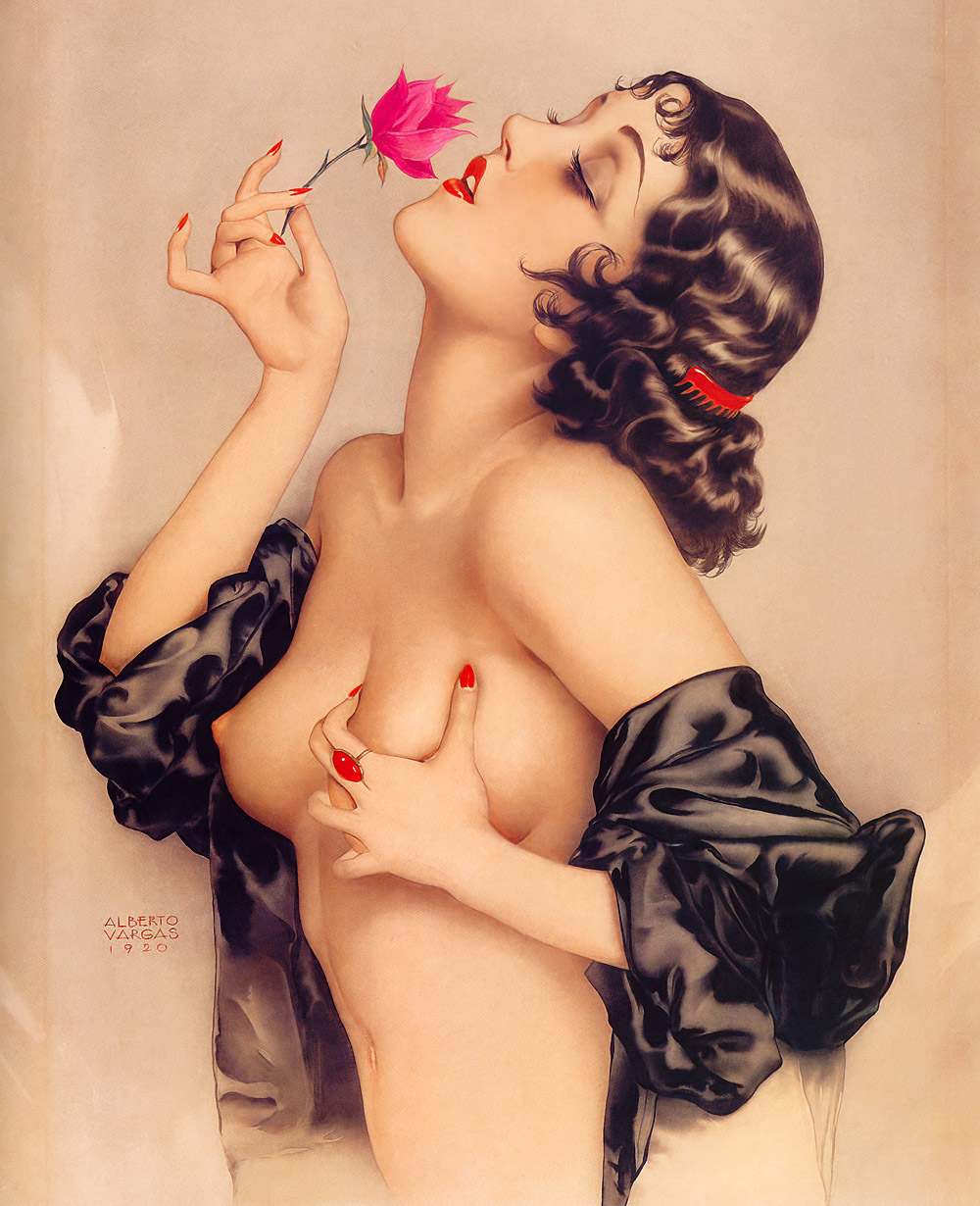
Memory of Olive Thomas or the Lotus Eater by Alberto Vergas (1920)

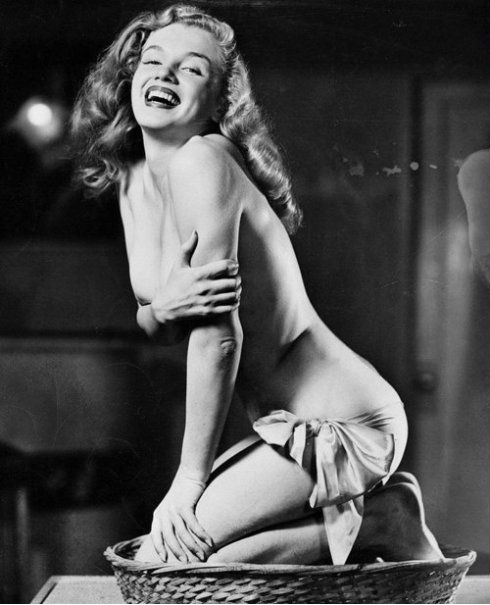
Pin-up photograph of actress and model Marilyn Monroe by Earl Moran (1950)

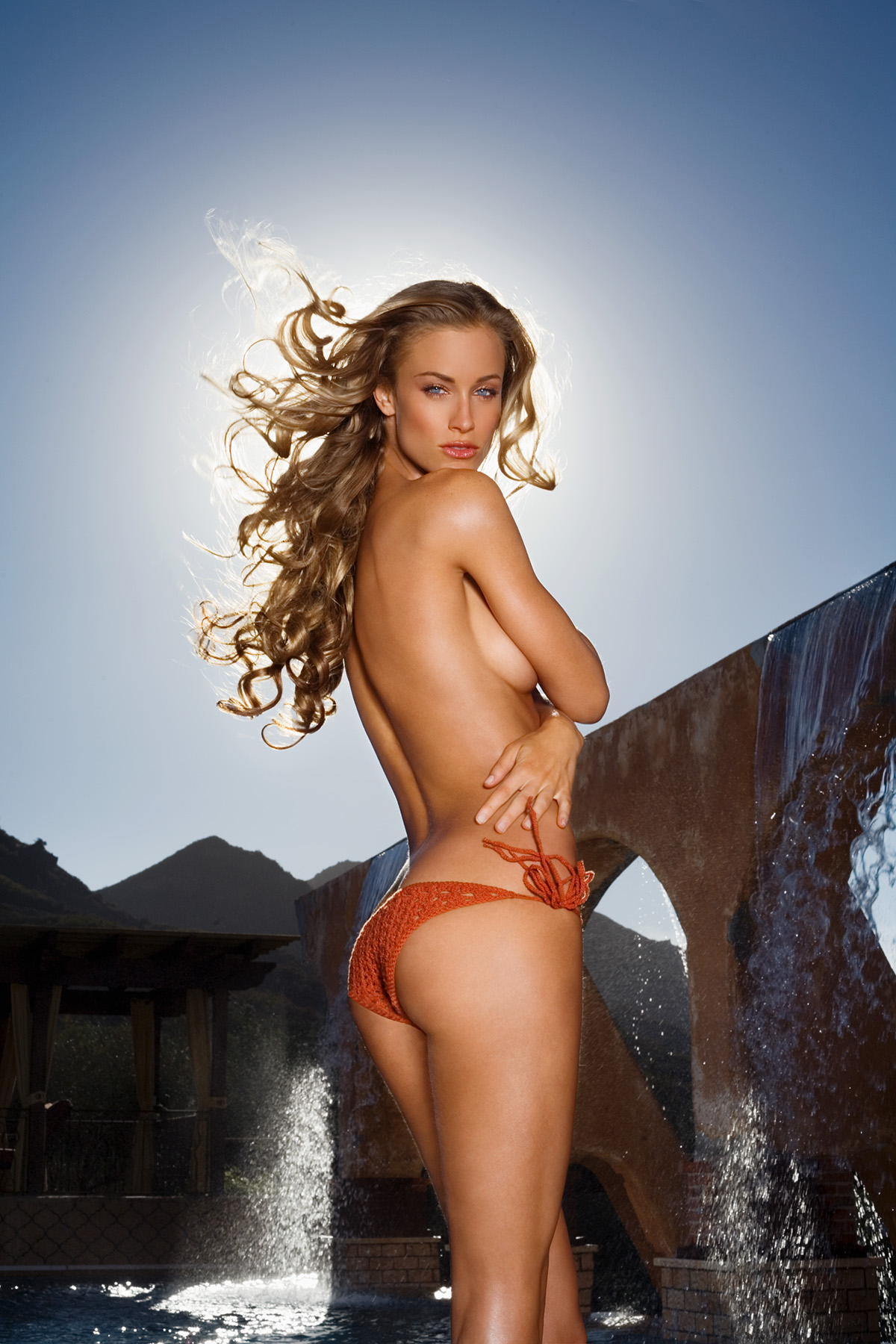
Model and television host Michele Merkin (2006), wearing an armbra

Due to high demand, nude imagery of celebrities a lucrative business exploited by websites and magazines, both on and offline. Such depictions include not just authorized images—such as film stills or screenshots, movie clips, copies of previously published images, like photographs for magazines—but also unauthorized ones, including sex tapes and paparazzi photos capturing celebrities in their private moments, and deceptively manipulated images.

Some actors and models have their photographs portraying them in various glamorous poses, oftentimes with scant or even no clothing, called pin-up art.

Playboy magazine was known for offering celebrities large amounts of money to appear nude in its magazine, and more downmarket pornographic magazines search far and wide for nude pictures of celebrities taken unaware—for example, when they are bathing topless or nude at what the subject thought was a secluded beach, or taken before the individual was well known. Paparazzi-produced photos are in high demand among sensationalist magazines and tabloids.

The Pirelli Calendar has historically contained images of women—many of whom actresses or models—in sexual or erotic poses. However, due to changing times, Pirelli, an Italian tyre manufacturing firm, has moved away from this kind of photography.

In some countries, privacy law and personality rights can lead to civil action against organizations that publish photos of nude celebrities without a model release, and this restricts the availability of such photos through the print media. On the internet, the difficulty of identifying offenders and applying court sanction makes circulation of such photographs much less risky. Such photographs circulate through online photo distribution channels such as usenet and internet forums, and commercial operators, often in countries beyond the reach of courts, also offer such photos for commercial gain. Copyright restrictions are often ignored.

=== Films and television ===
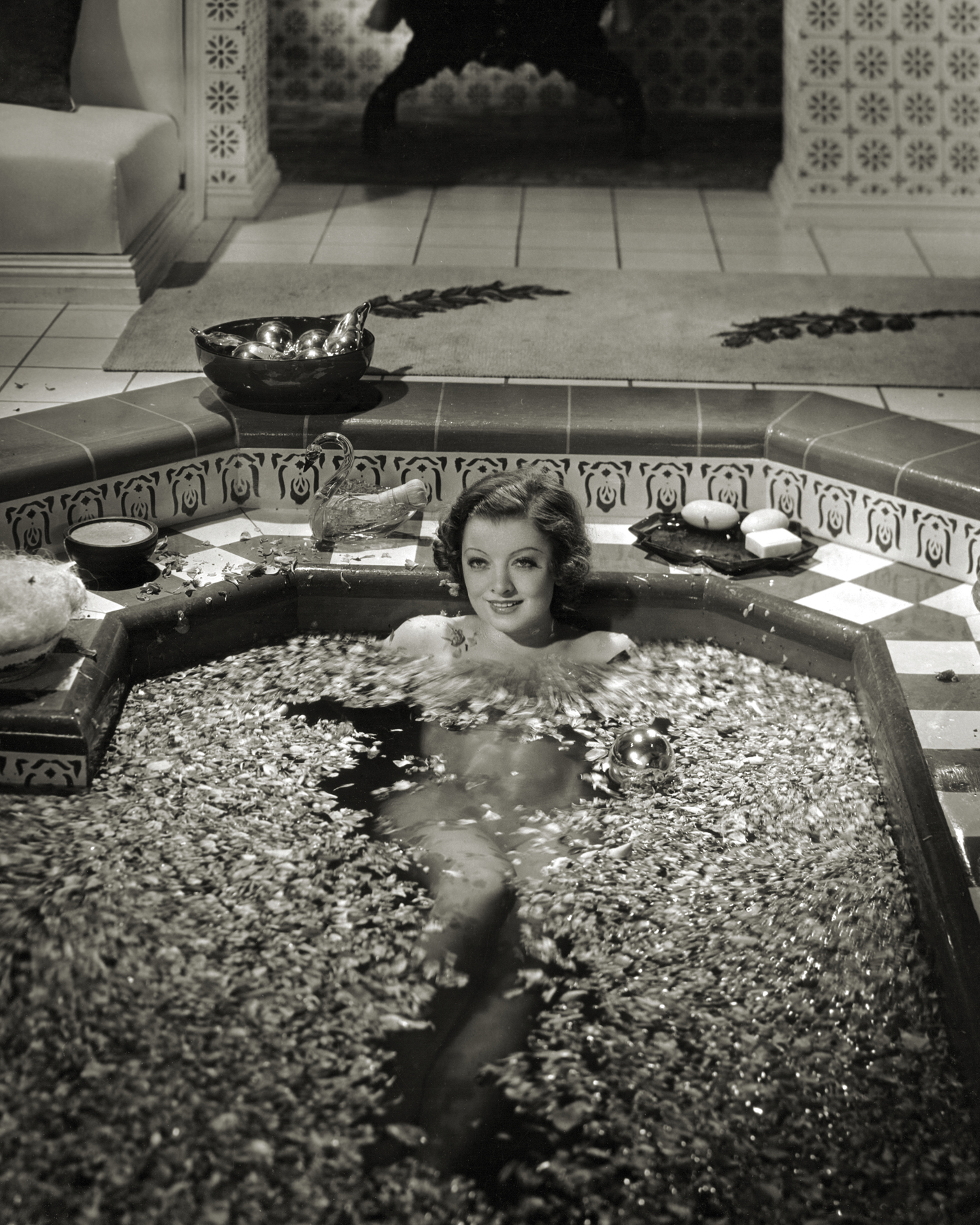
Myrna Loy in The Barbarian (1933), a pre-Code Hollywood production

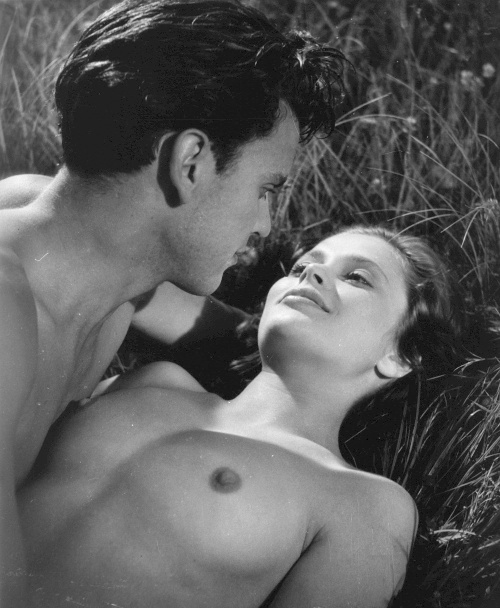
Ulla Jacobsson and Folke Sundquist in the 1951 film Hon dansade en sommar ("One Summer of Happiness")

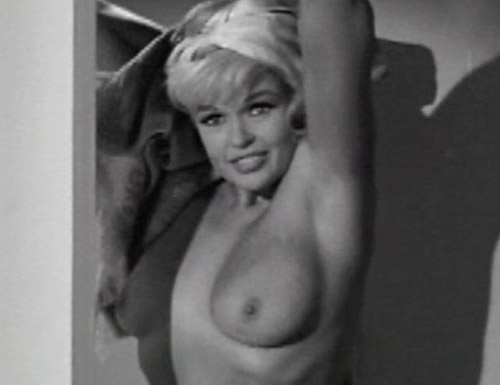
Jayne Mansfield in Promises! Promises! (1963)

In Western countries, nudity in film was historically deemed scandalous. For example, when the Swedish film Hon dansade en sommar ("One Summer of Happiness") was released 1951, it stirred considerable controversy because of a sequence involving nude swimming (or skinny dipping) and a close-up scene of sexual intercourse in which the breasts of Ulla Jacobsson were visible to the audience. (It also portrayed a local priest as the main antagonist.) As a result, in spite of its awards, the film was banned in Spain and several other countries. It was not widely released in the United States until 1955, although it was showing in San Francisco as early as October 1953. The film is the story of a young and innocent farm girl (played by Jacobsson) in love. In the United States, Promises! Promises! (1963) was the first feature film of the sound era in which a mainstream star (Jayne Mansfield) appeared in the nude.

However, today, nudity in film is no longer as controversial and may even be treated as natural. Nudity is frequently shown in scenes considered to require it, such as those that take place in nature, in the restroom, or those that involve intimacy. The Blue Lagoon (1980), a coming-of-age romantic and survival drama, shows the sexual awakening of two adolescent cousins of the opposite sex who find themselves stranded on a tropical island where nudity is a natural part of the environment, unlike the Victorian constraints of their upbringing. The relationship between a painter and his model, who oftentimes poses in the nude, is the context of a number of films. In the 1991 movie La Belle Noiseuse ("The Beautiful Troublemaker") the painter finds his motivation reinvigorated by his model. Similarly, in Titanic (1997) Rose Dewitt Bukater (played by Kate Winslet) poses nude for Jack Dawson (Leonardo DiCaprio). Nudity may also be portrayed in routine and non-sexual contexts. For instance, in Starship Troopers (1997), a mixed-shower scene is intended to demonstrate gender equality in the future.

Nevertheless, whether a nude scene is tasteful or gratuitous could still be a matter of debate. The rules or guidelines in continental Europe are generally more relaxed than those in the United Kingdom or the United States. But in general, women are generally more likely to be shown partially or entirely nude on screen compared to men. The television series Game of Thrones (2011–2019) and The White Lotus (2021–present) are relatively rare examples in which nude male bodies, including (prosthetic) male genitals, are put on display. Depending on the context, though, this is not necessarily for the benefit of the male gaze, especially if the female character in question is shown to have agency or if the actress playing her has a say in how much is shown and how. Moreover, there is a market for adaptations of romance stories told from the female perspective featuring some nudity and sexuality.

In the United States and Canada, nudity clauses are a standard part of the contracts signed by actors. But things were different in, say, France. The 2013 film Blue Is the Warmest Colour proved to be controversial not necessarily because it depicted a lesbian relationship for which it has been praised, but because of the conditions under which the starring actresses were forced to work by the director. In an interview with The Daily Beast, actress Adèle Exarchopoulos stated, "Most people don’t even dare to ask the things that he did, and they’re more respectful." In the aftermath of the MeToo movement in 2017, actresses have become increasingly willing to voice their concern over explicit nudity or sexuality on screen. Many film sets now recruit intimacy coordinators to ascertain the comfort, safety, and consent of all those involved in the shooting of such scenes. Controversy could also ensue if the actors were teenagers at the time of filming. As April Pearson, who was cast as Michelle Richardson in Skins (2007–2013), explained, "There’s a difference between being officially old enough and mentally old enough."

Lust, Caution (2007) is a Chinese-language erotic, historical, romantic, and mystery film based on the 1979 novella of the same name by Eileen Chang. The film is inspired by the real-life Chinese spy Zheng Pingru and her failed attempt to honey-trap and assassinate the Japanese collaborator Ding Mocun during the Second Sino-Japanese War (1937–1945). It was a critical and commercial success not just in Greater China but also internationally. In Taiwan and Hong Kong, it was screened uncut, but in mainland China, some scenes were censored. In South Korea, nudity in films is no longer unusual. In 2012 alone, the movies Eungyo, The Concubine, and The Scent were released with commercial success. However, critics argued that it was not nudity that led to their popularity among viewers but rather compelling plots.

Due to the culture of the United States, MTV, VH1, and other music-related television channels usually censor what they deem offensive or otherwise inappropriate for their viewers. For example, the music video for the song "Justify My Love" (1990) by Madonna contained a number of sexual fetishes and was consequently rejected by MTV. As Rolling Stone contributing editor Anthony Curtis explained, "...there's this kind of adolescent sexuality, with a lot of talking and looking and fantasizing. Through the years, MTV has done a very effective job of dancing up to the line without going over it. And that approach seems to work for them." In the United Kingdom, the Independent Broadcasting Authority, which regulated television and radio programming, banned the music video from being aired before nine o'clock in the evening.

=== Animation ===
Many animated works, from both Japan and western countries, include nudity in various contexts. Those works include:

- Canada: At the start of Bob's Birthday, Bob is wearing a dress shirt and tie, but his genitalia are exposed. In The Dingles, Doris Dingle is shown in the bathtub in one scene.
- France: In Kirikou and the Sorceress, Kirikou and many adult villagers are shown nude, owing to the pre-colonial African setting.
- Japan: Dragon Ball and its sequels have several scenes of humanoid nudity.
- United States: The Simpsons Movie has a scene of Bart skateboarding in the nude.

=== Magazine covers ===
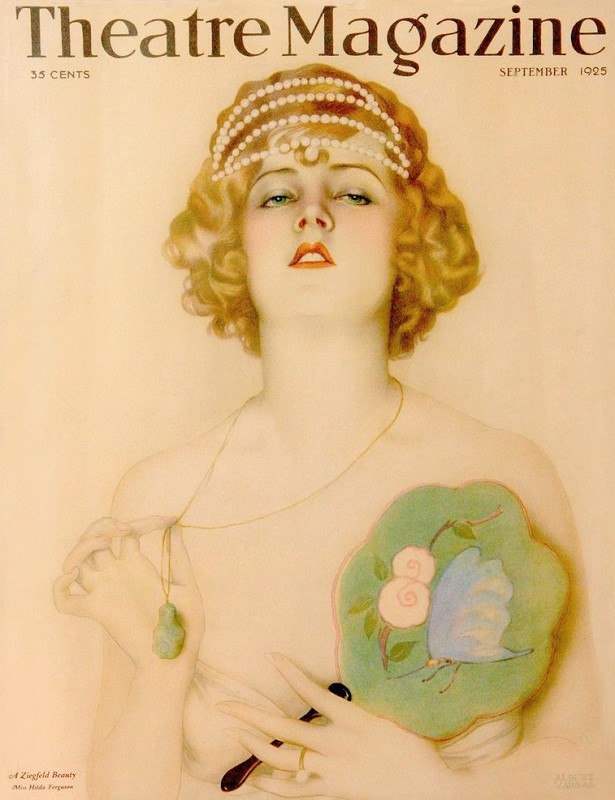
Theatre Magazine cover (1925) featuring Hilda Ferguson of the Ziegfeld Follies

In the early 1990s, Demi Moore posed nude for two covers of Vanity Fair: Demi's Birthday Suit and More Demi Moore. Later examples of implied nudity in mainstream magazine covers have included:

- Janet Jackson (Rolling Stone, 1993)
- Jennifer Aniston (Rolling Stone, 1996 and GQ, January 2009)
- The Dixie Chicks (Entertainment Weekly, May 2003)
- Scarlett Johansson and Keira Knightley (Vanity Fair, March 2006)
- Serena Williams (ESPN The Magazine's Body Issue, 2009)
- Alexander Skarsgård, Anna Paquin and Stephen Moyer; from the cast of True Blood (Rolling Stone, September 2010)
- Kim Kardashian (W, November 2010)
- Lake Bell (New York Magazine, August 2013)
- Miley Cyrus (Rolling Stone, October 2013)

=== Music album covers ===
Nudity is occasionally presented in other media, often with attending controversy. For example, album covers for music by performers such as Jimi Hendrix (Electric Ladyland), John Lennon and Yoko Ono (Unfinished Music No. 1: Two Virgins), Nirvana (Nevermind), Blind Faith, Scorpions (Virgin Killer), Amanda Palmer (There Will Be No Intermission), Jane's Addiction, and Santana have contained nudity. Several rock musicians have performed nude on stage, including members of Jane's Addiction, Rage Against the Machine, Green Day, Stone Temple Pilots, The Jesus Lizard, Blind Melon, Red Hot Chili Peppers, blink-182, Naked Raygun, Queens of the Stone Age and The Bravery.

The provocative photo of a nude prepubescent girl on the original cover of the Virgin Killer album by the Scorpions also brought controversy.

== Erotic depictions ==
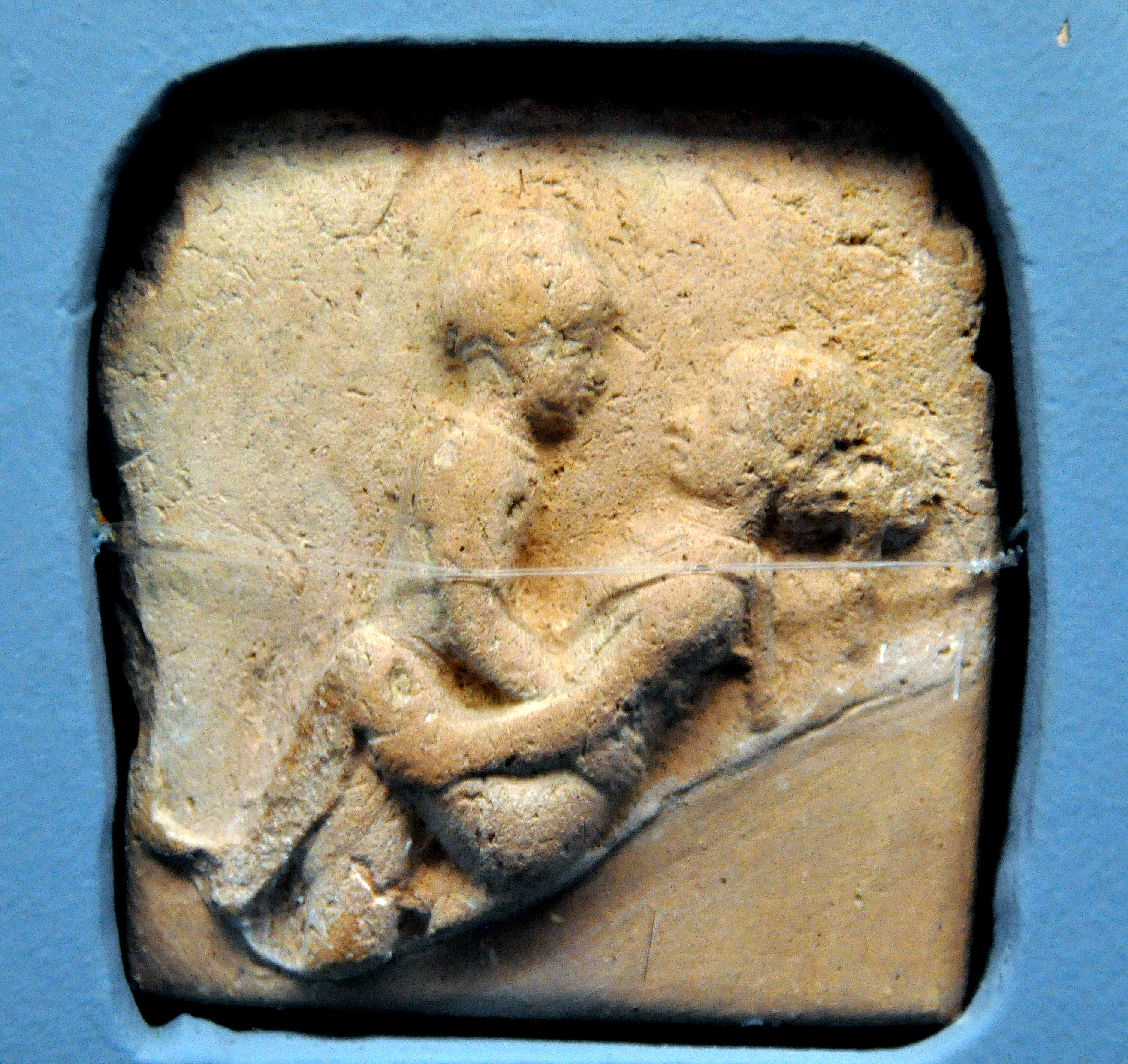
A clay plaque of a couple having sexual intercourse in the missionary position, from Old Babylon (2nd millennium B.C.)

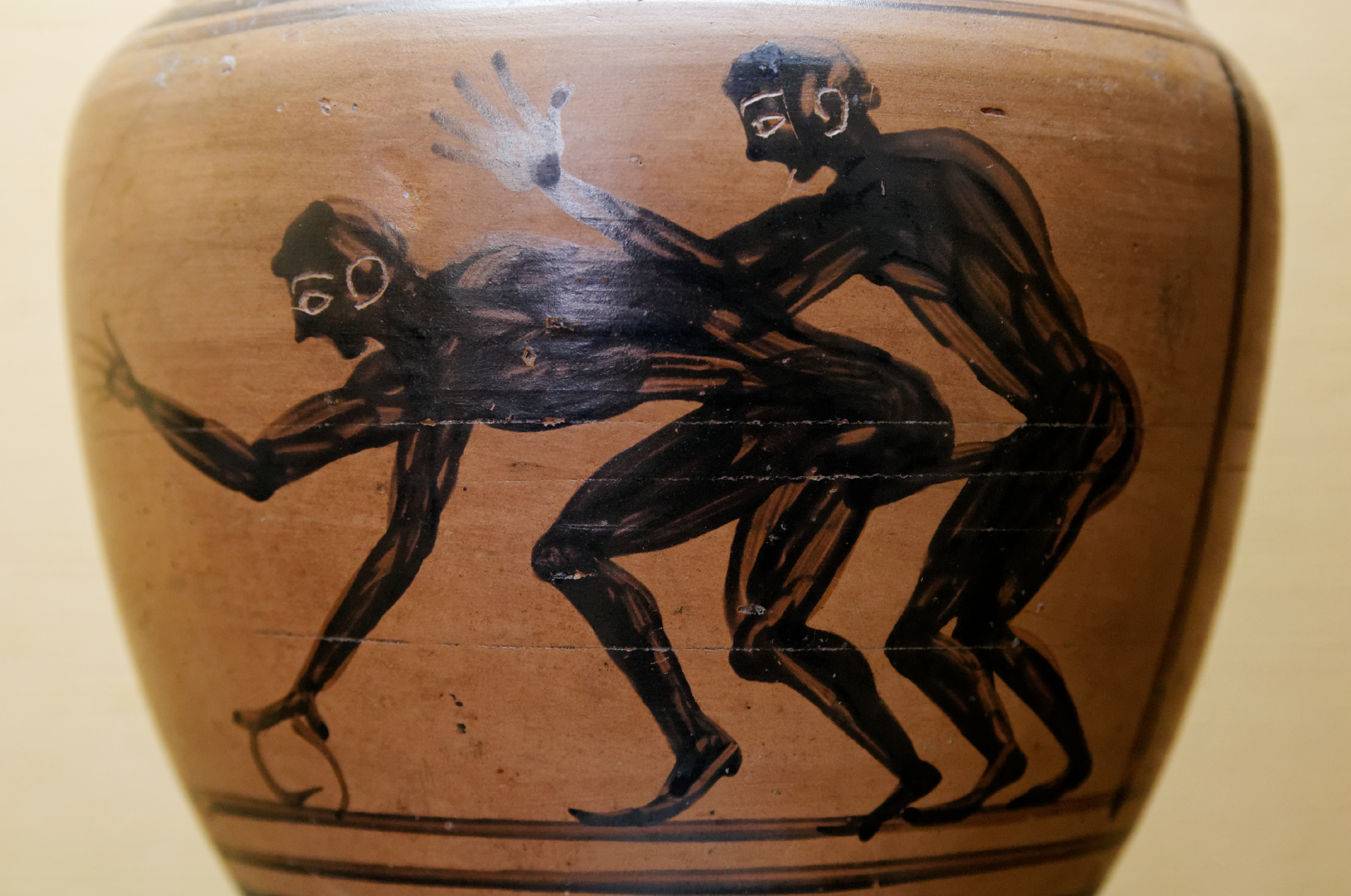
This Etruscan amphora (5th century B.C.) depicts two male youths engaging in anal intercourse.

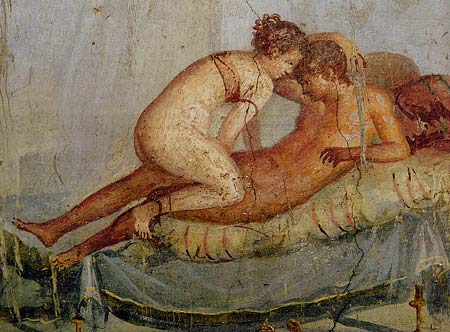
An intimate scene depicted in a wall painting in Pompeii (1st century A.D.) The woman is wearing a strophium, the ancient Roman equivalent of a modern-day brassière or a bikini top.

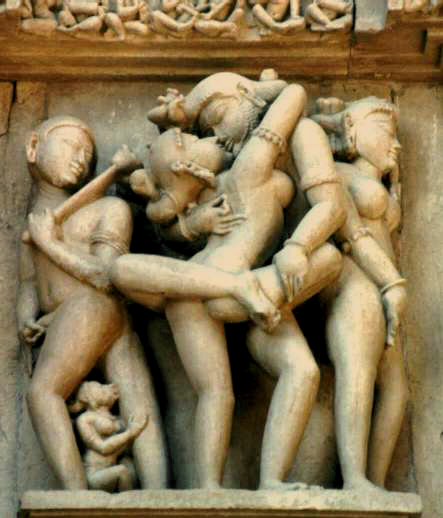
An erotic sculpture from a temple at Khajuraho, India, 10th century A.D.

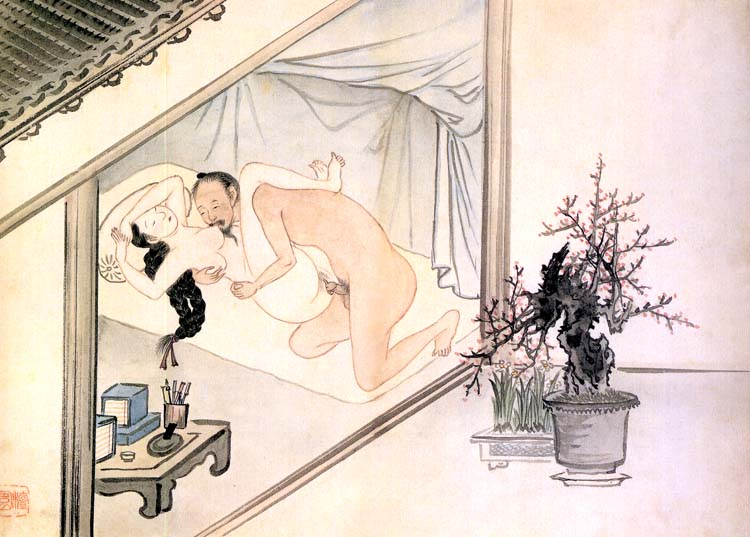
A Korean erotic artwork (chunhwa) painted by Gim Hongdo from the Joseon era.

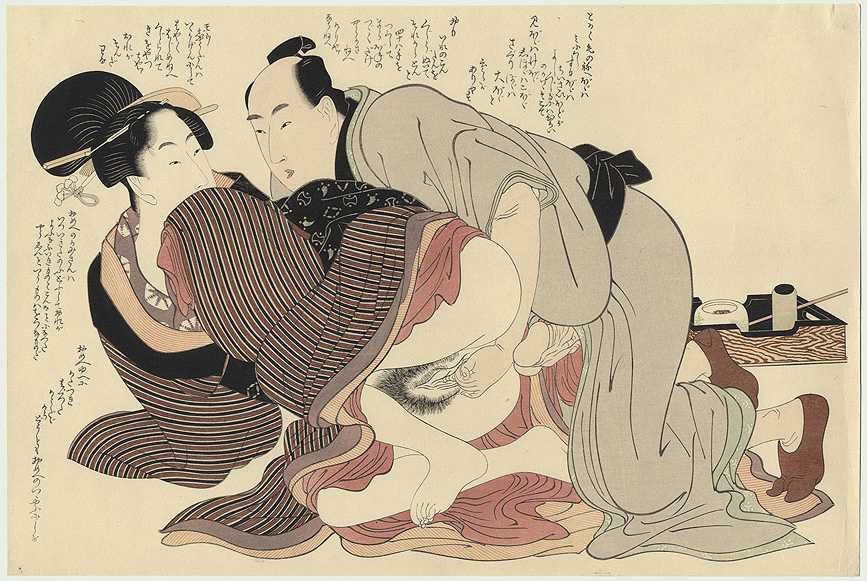
Erotic artworks such as this one (A.D. 1799) served as a guide for newly married couples in Japan.

Sexually explicit images, other than those having a scientific or educational purpose, are generally categorized as either erotic art or pornography, but sometimes can be both.

Early cultures often associated the sexual act with supernatural forces and thus their religion is intertwined with such depictions. In Asian polities such as India, Nepal, Sri Lanka, Japan, Korea, and China, erotic artworks and other representations of human sexuality have specific spiritual meanings within their respective native religions. In Europe, ancient Greece and Rome produced much art and decoration of an erotic nature, much of it integrated with their own religious beliefs and cultural practices.

Japanese painters like Hokusai and Utamaro, in addition to their usual themes also executed erotic depictions. Such paintings were called shunga (literally: "spring" or "picture of spring"). They served as sexual guidance for newly married couples in Japan in general, and the sons and daughters of prosperous families were given elaborate pictures as presents on their wedding days. Most shunga are a type of ukiyo-e, usually executed in woodblock print format. It was traditional to present a bride with ukiyo-e depicting erotic scenes from the Tale of Genji.

Shunga were relished by both men and women of all classes. Superstitions and customs surrounding shunga suggest as much; in the same way that it was considered a lucky charm against death for a samurai to carry shunga, it was considered a protection against fire in merchant warehouses and the home. The samurai, chonin, and housewives all owned shunga. All three of these groups would undergo separation from the opposite sex; the samurai lived in camps for months at a time, and conjugal separation resulted from the sankin-kōtai system and the merchants' need to travel to obtain and sell goods. Records of women obtaining shunga themselves from book-lenders show that they were consumers of it.

The Khajuraho temples contain sexual or erotic art on the external walls of the temple. Some of the sanctuaries have erotic statuettes both on the outside of the inner wall. A small amount of the carvings contain sexual themes and those seemingly do not depict deities but rather sexual activities between human individuals. The rest depict the everyday life. These carvings are possibly tantric sexual practices.

Another perspective of these carvings is presented by James McConnachie in his history of the Kamasutra. McConnachie describes the zesty 10% of the Khajuraho sculptures as "the apogee of erotic art":

Twisting, broad-hipped and high breasted nymphs display their generously contoured and bejewelled bodies on exquisitely worked exterior wall panels. These fleshy apsaras run riot across the surface of the stone, putting on make-up, washing their hair, playing games, dancing, and endlessly knotting and unknotting their girdles....Beside the heavenly nymphs are serried ranks of griffins, guardian deities and, most notoriously, extravagantly interlocked maithunas, or lovemaking couples.

In the modern era, erotic photographs are normally taken for commercial purposes. They include mass-produced items such as decorative calendars and pinups. Many of them may also be found in men's magazines, such as Penthouse and Playboy.

== Informational or educational ==
Two spacecraft Pioneer 10 (launched March 2, 1972) and 11 (launched April 5, 1973) each carried a pioneer plaque metal sheet with a "message of peace" and information about humanity for any potential intelligent extraterrestrial life that might encounter them.

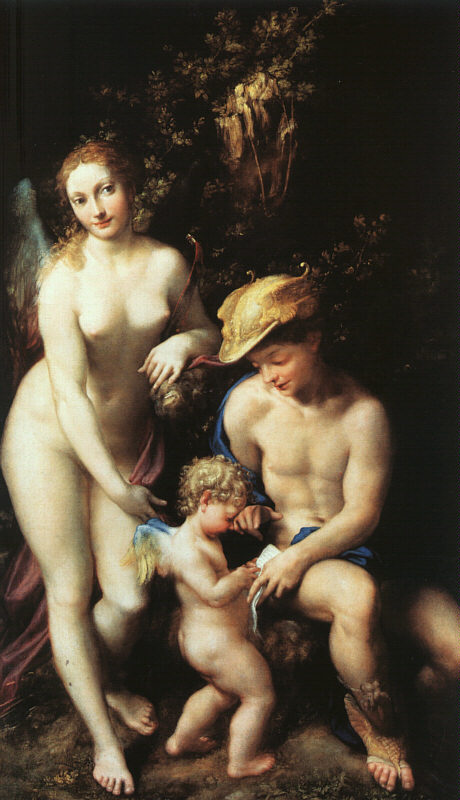
The Education of Cupid (1527) by Antonio da Correggio. This painting does not depict a Greek myth but rather reflects a growing interest in classical scholarship during the Renaissance.

=== Studies of the human body ===
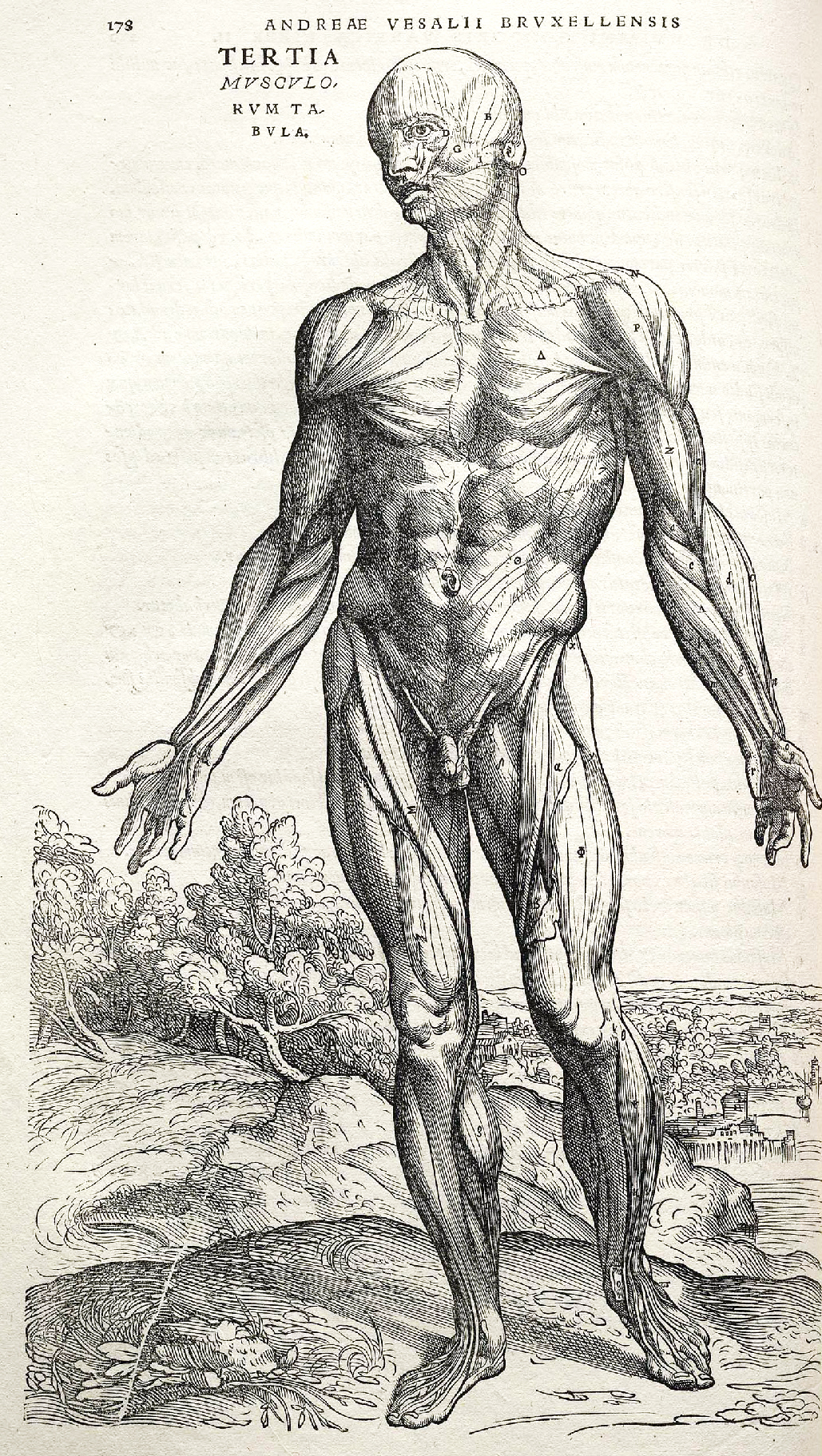
Anatomical study from De humani corporis fabrica (1543) by Andreas Vesalius

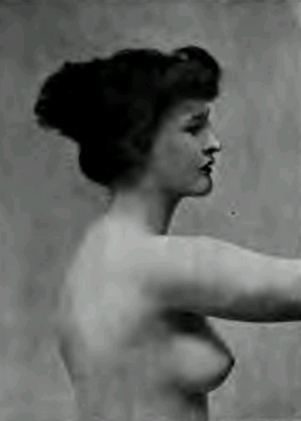
An image from A Handbook of Anatomy for Art Students (1896) by Arthur Thompson for art students

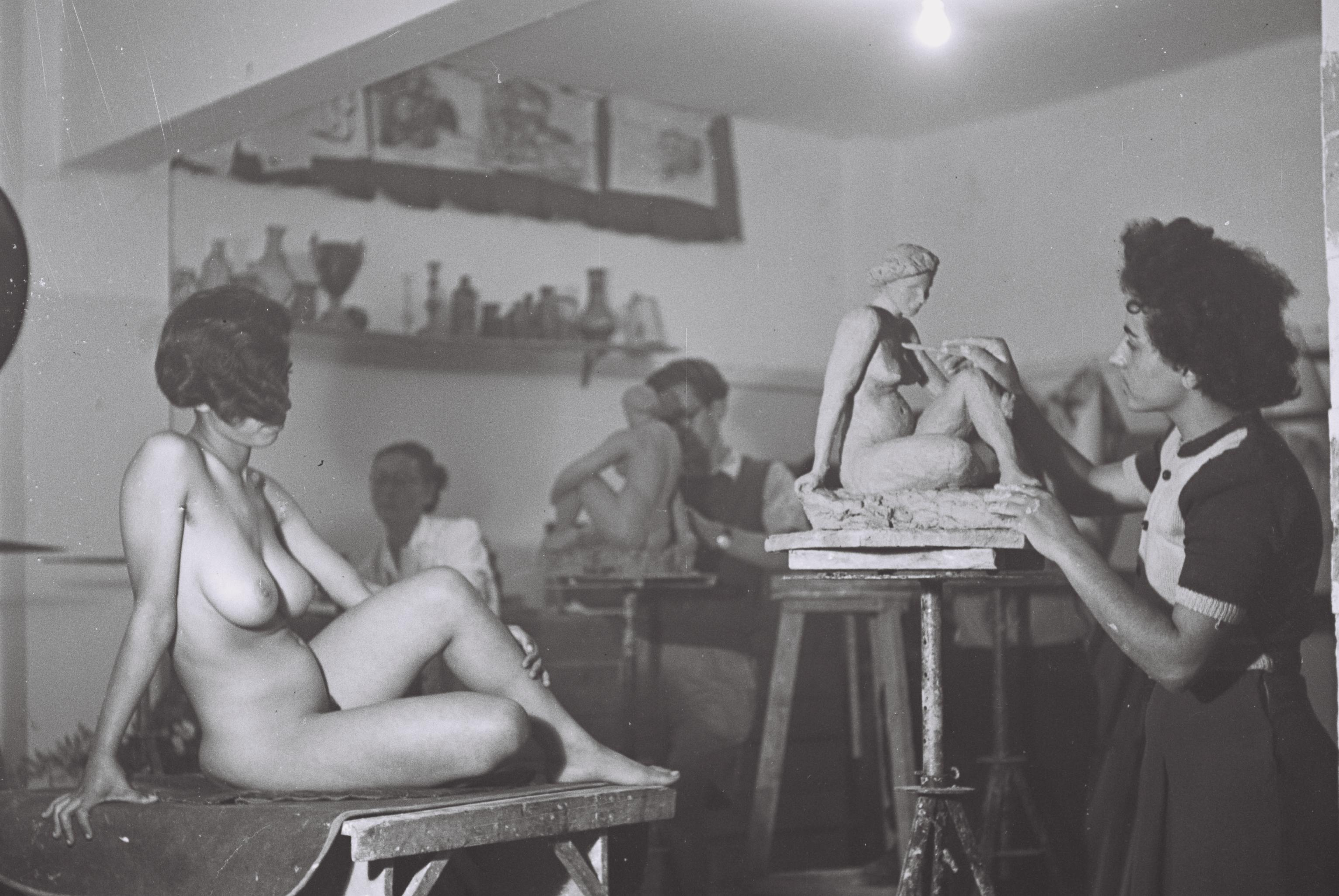
Young artists studying sculpture in Tel Aviv, 1946

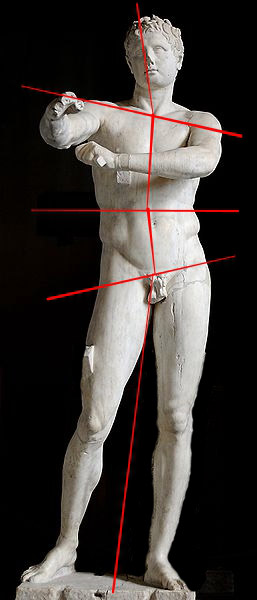
Contrapposto

In art, a study is a drawing, sketch or painting done in preparation for a finished piece, or as visual notes. Painting and drawing studies (life-drawing, sketching and anatomy) were part of the artist's education.

Studies are used by artists to understand the problems involved in execution of the artists subjects and the disposition of the elements of the artist work, such as the human body depicted using light, color, form, perspective and composition. Studies can be traced back as long ago as the Italian Renaissance, for example Leonardo da Vinci's and Michelangelo's studies. Anatomical studies of the human body were also executed by medical doctors. The anatomical studies of physician Andreas Vesalius titled De humani corporis fabrica (On the fabric of the human body), published 1543, was a pioneering work of human anatomy illustrated by Titian's pupil Jan Stephen van Calcar.

The Fabrica emphasized the priority of dissection and what has come to be called the "anatomical" view of the body, seeing human internal functioning as an essentially corporeal structure filled with organs arranged in three-dimensional space. In this work, Vesalius also becomes the first person to describe mechanical ventilation. It is largely this achievement that has resulted in Vesalius being incorporated into the Australian and New Zealand College of Anaesthetists college arms and crest. Sketching is generally a prescribed part of the studies of art students, who need to develop their ability to quickly record impressions through sketching, from a live model. The sketch is a rapidly executed freehand drawing that is not usually intended as a finished work. The sketch may serve a number of purposes: it might record something that the artist sees, it might record or develop an idea for later use or it might be used as a quick way of graphically demonstrating an image, idea or principle. A sketch usually implies a quick and loosely drawn work, while related terms such as study, and "preparatory drawing" usually refer to more finished drawings to be used for a final work. Most visual artists use, to a greater or lesser degree, the sketch as a method of recording or working out ideas. The sketchbooks of some individual artists have become very well known, including those of Leonardo da Vinci, Michelangelo and Edgar Degas which have become art objects in their own right, with many pages showing finished studies as well as sketches.

=== Biology and sexual education ===
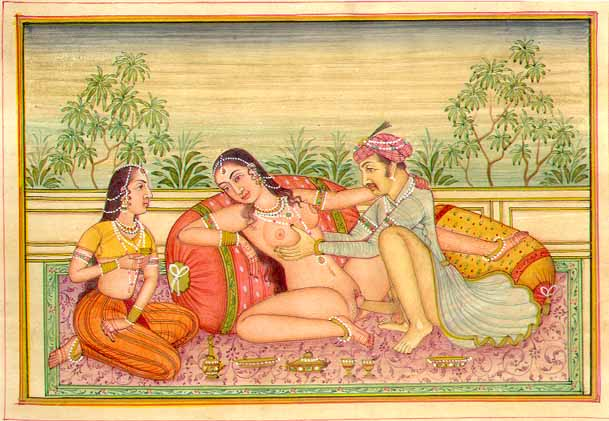
An illustration from the Kama Sutra, a sex manual from India (3rd century A.D.)

Depictions of the human body, some of which explicitly nude, may be found in books in the context of human biology, growth and development (especially during puberty), human sexuality, and sex education, as appropriate for the age of the intended students. Nude photographs and illustrations are also found in sex manuals.

=== Ethnographic photography ===
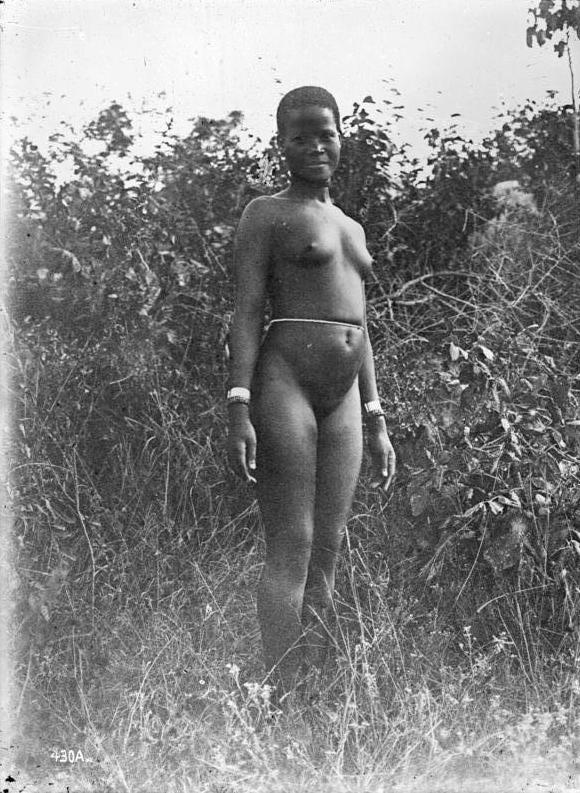
Nude young woman in the African Great Lakes region, between 1906 and 1918

What is generally called "ethnographic" nudity has appeared both in serious research works on ethnography and anthropology, as well as in commercial documentaries and in the National Geographic magazine in the United States.

In some cases, media outlets may show nudity that occurs in a "natural" or spontaneous setting in news programs or documentaries, while blurring out or censoring the nudity in a dramatic work. The ethnographic focus provided an exceptional framework for photographers to depict peoples whose nudity was, or still is, acceptable within the mores, or within certain specific settings, of their traditional culture.

Detractors of ethnographic nudity often dismiss it as merely the colonial gaze preserved in the guise of scientific documentation. In April 2018, National Geographic published a special issue on race in which it acknowledged the racism in both its reporting and photography, ignoring contemporary people of color while picturing natives as exotic and frequently unclothed.

However, the works of some ethnographic painters and photographers including Herb Ritts, David LaChappelle, Bruce Weber, Irving Penn, Casimir Zagourski, Hugo Bernatzik and Leni Riefenstahl, have received worldwide acclaim for preserving a record of the mores of what are perceived as "paradises" threatened by the onslaught of average modernity.

== See also ==
- Figure drawing § Academy figure
- Artistic freedom
- Pubic hair § In art
- Tableau vivant
- Striptease
- Nude (art)
- Breast imaging
