= Erotic photography =

Art photography using erotica, and sexually suggestive appeals

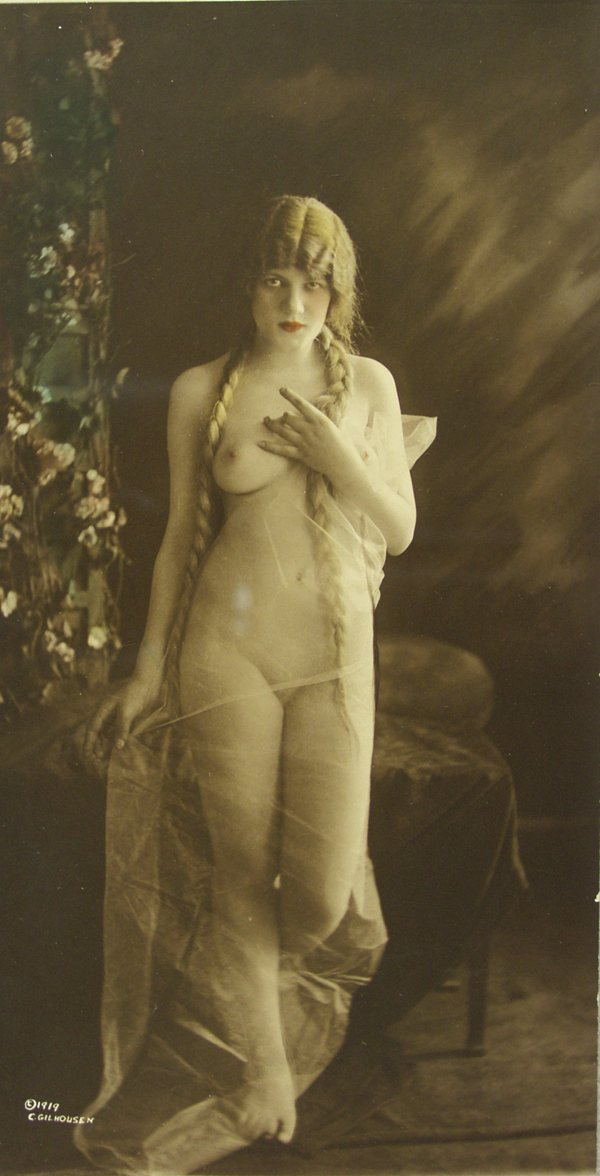
Female nude by Charles Gilhousen, postcard, 1919

Erotic photography is a style of art photography of an erotic, sexually suggestive or sexually provocative nature. It is a type of erotic art.

== Scope and purpose ==
In a spectrum, erotic photography is often distinguished from nude photography, which contains nude subjects not necessarily in erotic situations, and pornographic photography, which is of a sexually detailed nature. Pornographic photography generally moves in the direction of the "obscene", and is judged as lacking in artistic or aesthetic value; however, the line between art and pornography has been both socially and legally debated, and many photographers have created work that intentionally ignores these distinctions.

Erotic photographs are normally intended for commercial use, including mass-produced items such as decorative calendars, pinups and for men's magazines, such as Penthouse and Playboy, but many art photographers have also dabbled in detailed or erotic imagery. Additionally, sometimes erotic photographs are intended to be seen only by a subject's partner. Glamour photography is frequently erotic.

== Models ==
The subjects of erotic photographs include professional models, celebrities and amateurs. Well-known entertainers do not generally pose nude for photographs. The first entertainer to pose nude for photographs was the stage actress Adah Isaacs Menken (1835–1868). However, a number of well-known film stars have posed as pin-up models and been promoted in photography and other media as sex symbols. The majority of erotic photographs are of female subjects, but erotic images of men are also published.

There are no formal qualifications to model, but legal ages are required. The themes used in erotic photoshoots can be diverse, and it is up to the model and photographer to determine what the shoot will entail, so the model has to be aware of their limits.

== Beginnings ==
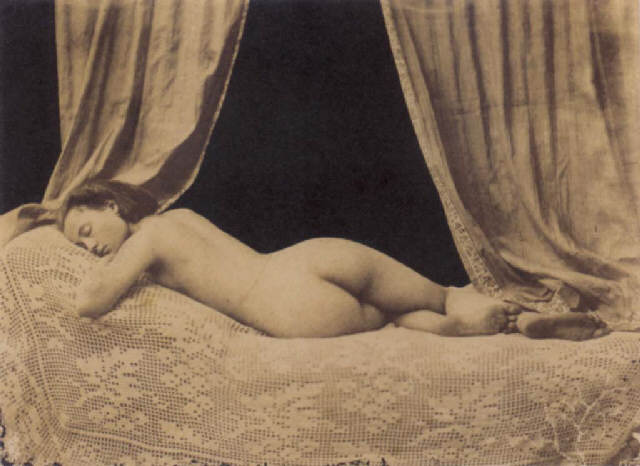
Recumbent female nude, Amélie by Félix-Jacques Moulin, c. 1852–1853

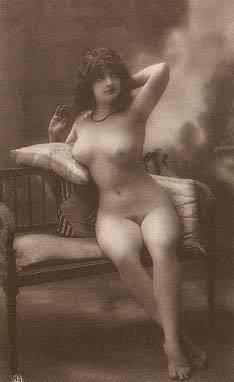
19th-century nude photograph by unknown photographer

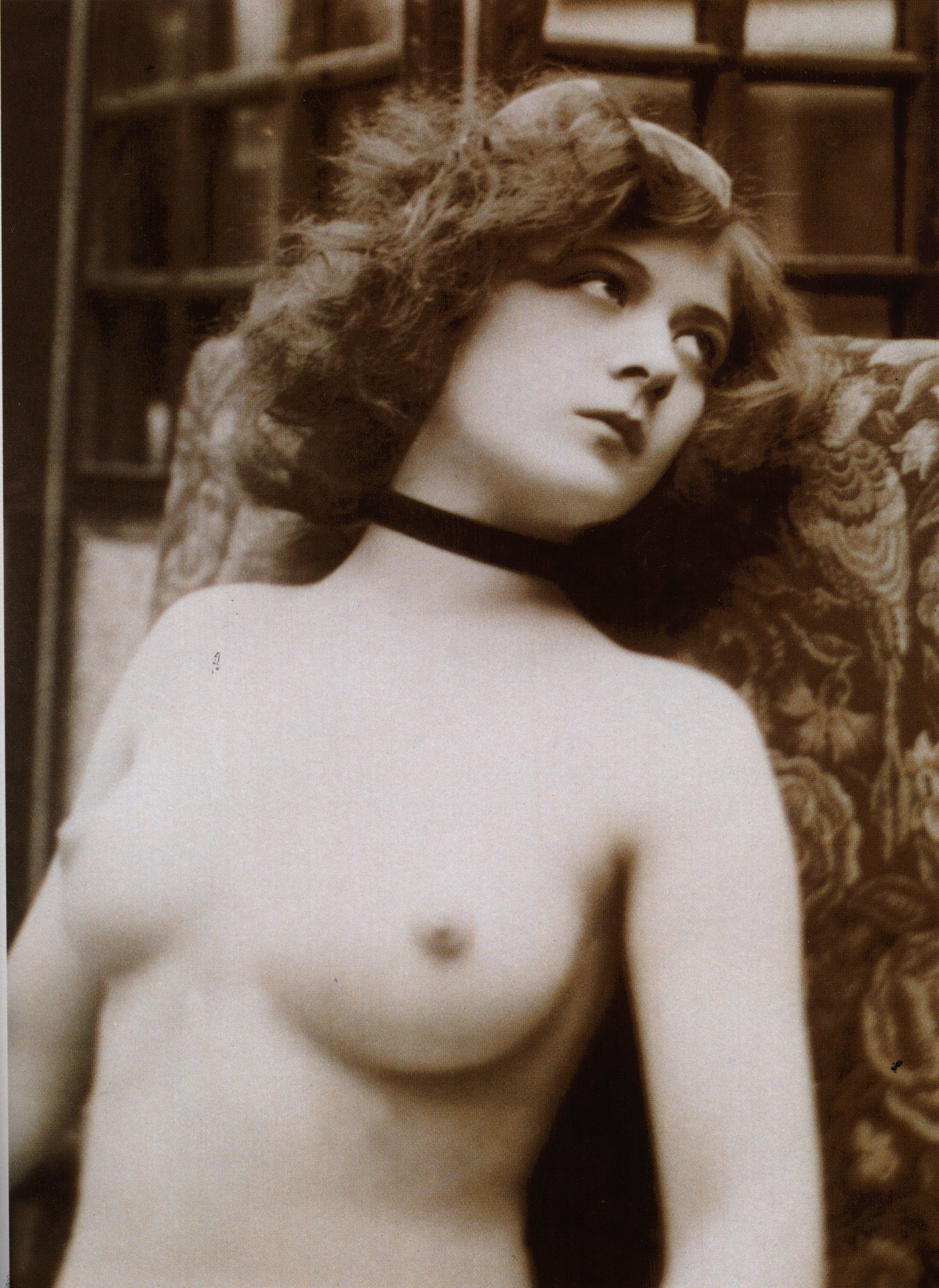
Bust photograph of a young nude lady by unknown photographer, 19th century

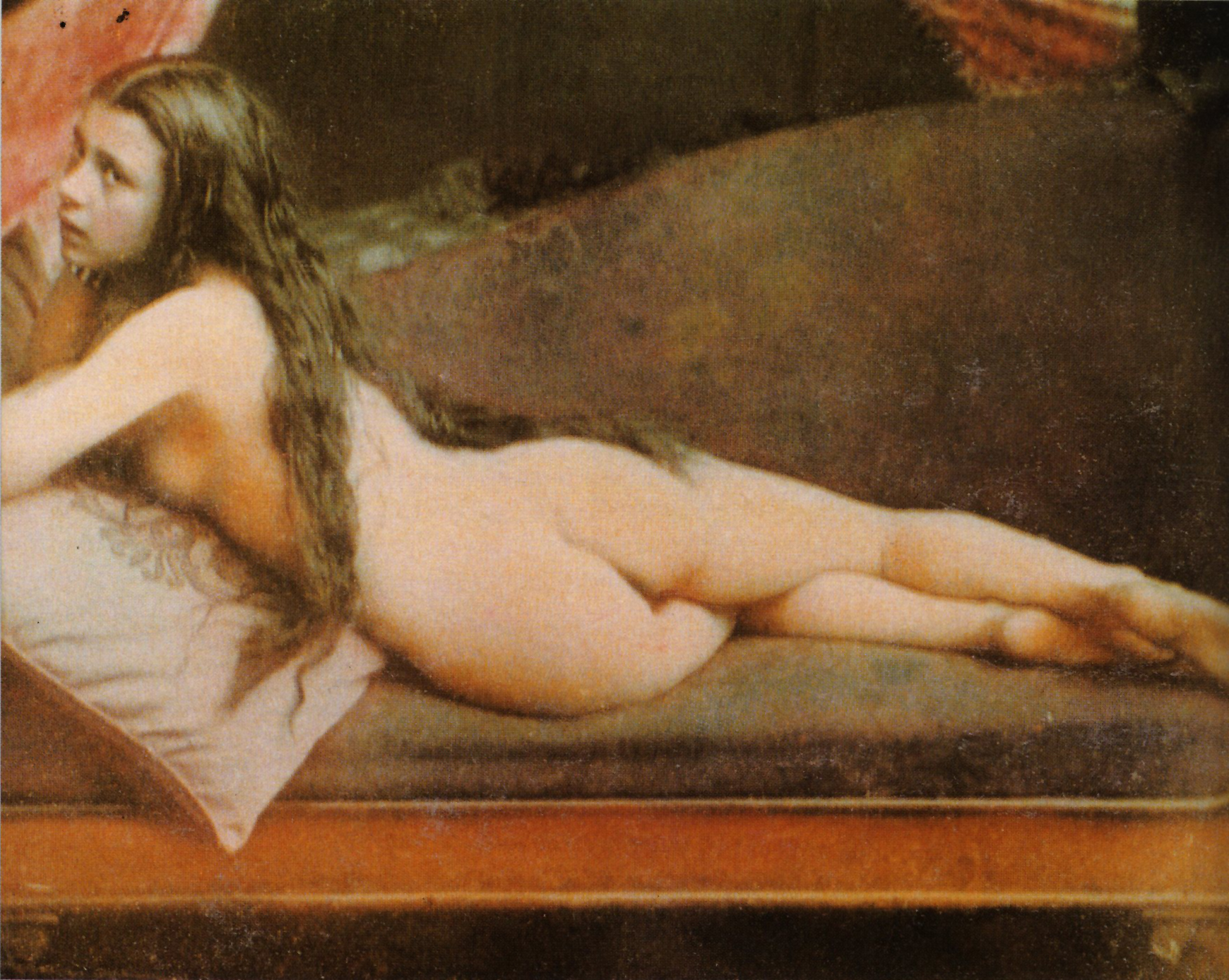
Woman poses naked for the camera, Félix-Jacques Moulin, c. 1851–1854

Before 1839, depictions of nudity and erotica generally consisted of paintings, drawings and engravings. In that year, Louis Daguerre presented the first practical process of photography to the French Academy of Sciences. Unlike earlier photograph methods, his daguerreotypes had stunning quality and did not fade with time. Artists adopted the technology as a new way to depict the nude form, which in practice was the feminine form. In so doing, at least initially, they tried to follow the styles and traditions of the art form. Traditionally, in France, an académie was a nude study done by a painter to master the female (or male) form. Each had to be registered with the French government and approved or they could not be sold. Soon, nude photographs were being registered as académie and marketed as aids to painters. However, the realism of a photograph as opposed to the idealism of a painting made many of these intrinsically erotic.

In Nude Photography, 1840–1920, Peter Marshall notes: "In the prevailing moral climate at the time of the invention of photography, the only officially sanctioned photography of the body was for the production of artist's studies. Many of the surviving examples of daguerreotypes are clearly not in this genre but have a sensuality that clearly implies they were designed as erotic or pornographic images".

The daguerreotypes were not without drawbacks, however. The main difficulty was that they could only be reproduced by photographing the original picture since each image was an original and the all-metal process does not use negatives. In addition, the earliest daguerreotypes had exposure times ranging from three to fifteen minutes, making them somewhat impractical for portraiture. Unlike earlier drawings, action could not be shown. The poses that the models struck had to be held very still for a long time. Another limitation was the monochrome image that the technology could produce. Because of this, the standard pornographic image shifted from one of two or more people engaged in sex acts to a solitary woman exposing her genitals. The cost of the process also limited the spread of the technology. Since one picture could cost a week's salary, the audience for nudes mostly consisted of artists and the upper echelon of society.

Stereoscopy was invented in 1838 and became extremely popular for daguerreotypes, including the erotic images. This technology produced a type of three dimensional view that suited erotic images quite well. Although thousands of erotic daguerreotypes were created, only around 800 are known to survive; however, their uniqueness and expense meant that they were once the toys of rich men. Due to their rarity, the works can sell for more than £GB 10,000.

=== The calotype process ===
In 1841, William Fox Talbot patented the calotype process, the first negative-positive process, making possible multiple copies. This invention permitted an almost limitless number of prints to be produced from a glass negative. The technology also reduced the exposure time and made possible a true mass market for low cost commercial photography. The technology was immediately employed to reproduce nude portraits, classified by the standards of the time as pornographic. Paris soon became the centre of this trade. In 1848 only thirteen photography studios existed in Paris; by 1860, there were over 400. Most of them made income from the sale of illicit nude images to the masses who could now afford it. The pictures were also sold near train stations, by traveling salesmen and women in the streets who hid them under their dresses. They were often produced in sets (of four, eight or twelve), and exported internationally, mainly to England and the United States. Both the models and the photographers were commonly from the working class, and the artistic model excuse was increasingly hard to use. By 1855, no more photographic nudes were being registered as académie, and the business had gone underground to escape prosecution.

=== The Victorian tradition ===
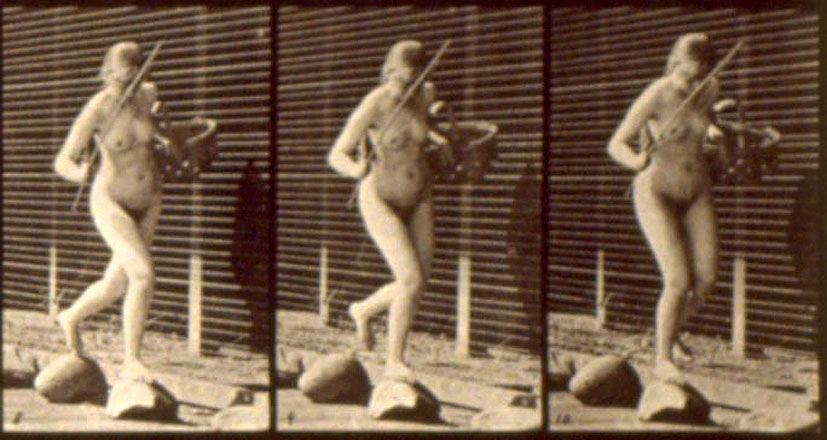
Eadweard Muybridge: Woman walking with fishing pole (detail)

The Victorian pornographic tradition in Britain had three main elements: French photographs, erotic prints (sold in shops in Holywell Street, a long vanished London thoroughfare, swept away by the Aldwych), and printed literature. The ability to reproduce photographs in bulk assisted the rise of a new business individual, the porn dealer. Many of these dealers used the postal system to distribute erotic photography, sending the photographic cards to subscribers in plain wrappings. Victorian pornography had several defining characteristics. It reflected a very mechanistic view of the human anatomy and its functions. Science, the new obsession, was invoked to ostensibly study the nude human body. Consequently, the sexuality of the subject is often depersonalised, and is without any passion or tenderness. At this time, it also became popular to depict nude photographs of women of exotic ethnicities, under the umbrella of science.

Studies of this type can be found in the work of Eadweard Muybridge. Although he photographed both men and women, the women were often given props like market baskets and fishing poles, making the images of women thinly disguised erotica.

Parallel to the British printing history, photographers and printers in France frequently turned to the medium of postcards, producing great numbers of them. Such cards came to be known in the US as "French postcards".

== French influence ==
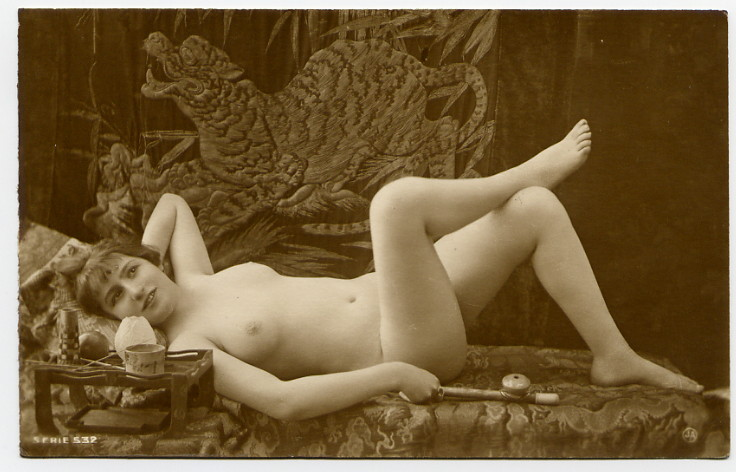
Jean Agélou

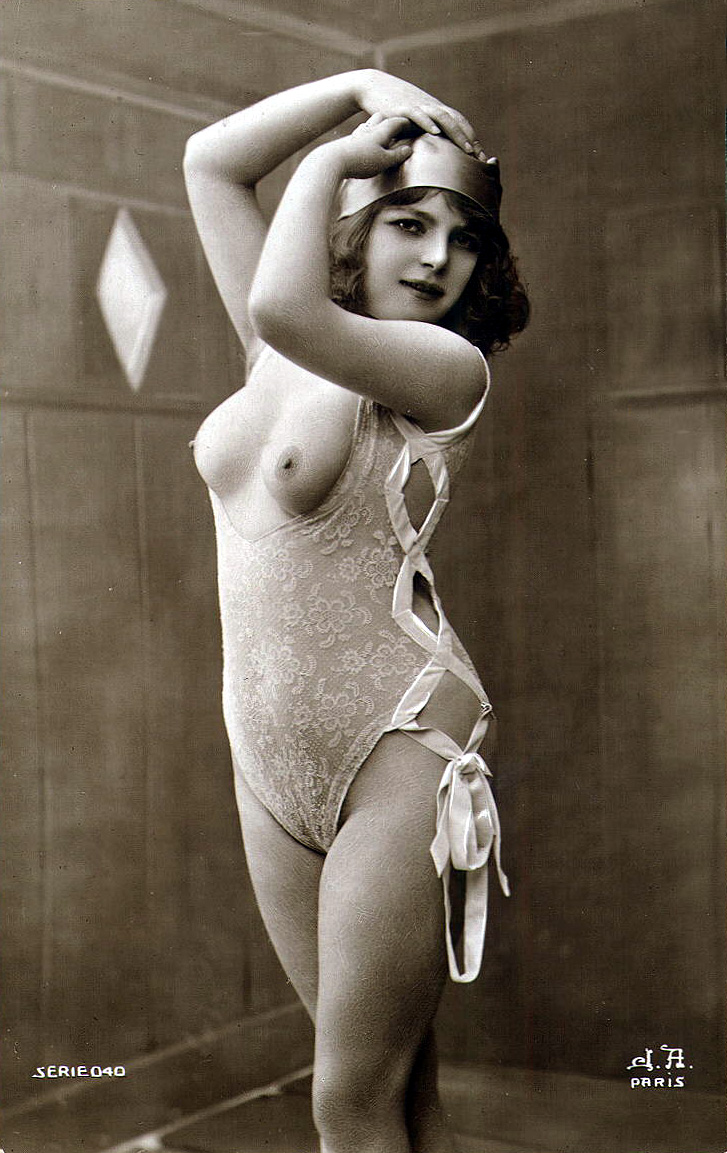
Jean Agélou
Model: Fernande

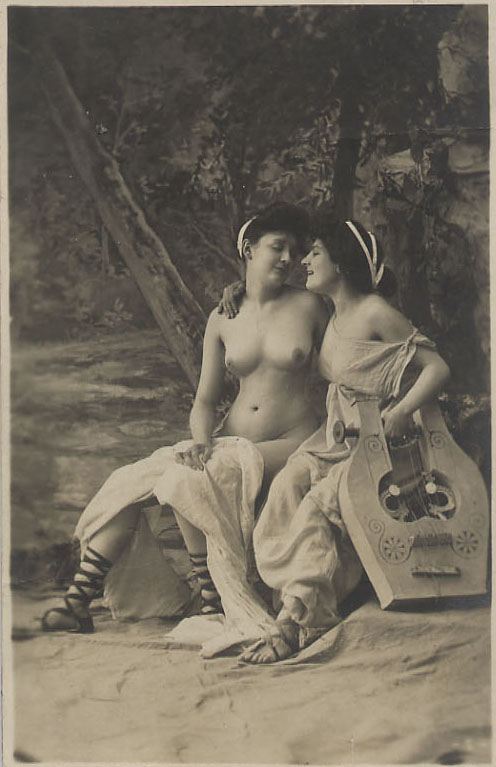
Pseudo-classical scene with kithara

The initial appearance of picture postcards (and the enthusiasm with which the new medium was embraced) raised some legal issues that can be seen as precursors to later controversies over the Internet. Picture postcards allowed and encouraged many individuals to send images across national borders, and the legal availability of a postcard image in one country did not guarantee that the card would be considered "proper" in the destination country, or in the intermediate countries that the card would have to pass through. Some countries refused to handle postcards containing sexual references (such as of seaside scenes) or images of full or partial nudity (including images of classical statuary or paintings). Many French postcards featured naked women in erotic poses. These were described as postcards but whose primary purpose was not for sending by post because they would have been banned from delivery. Street dealers, tobacco shops, and a variety of other vendors bought the photographs for resale to tourists. The sale of erotica was banned, and many of these postcards were sold "under the counter".

Instead, nude and erotic photographs were marketed in a monthly magazine called La Beauté that was ostensibly targeted for artists looking for poses. Each issue contained 75 nude images which could be ordered by mail, in the form of postcards, hand-tinted or sepia toned.

== Early 20th century ==
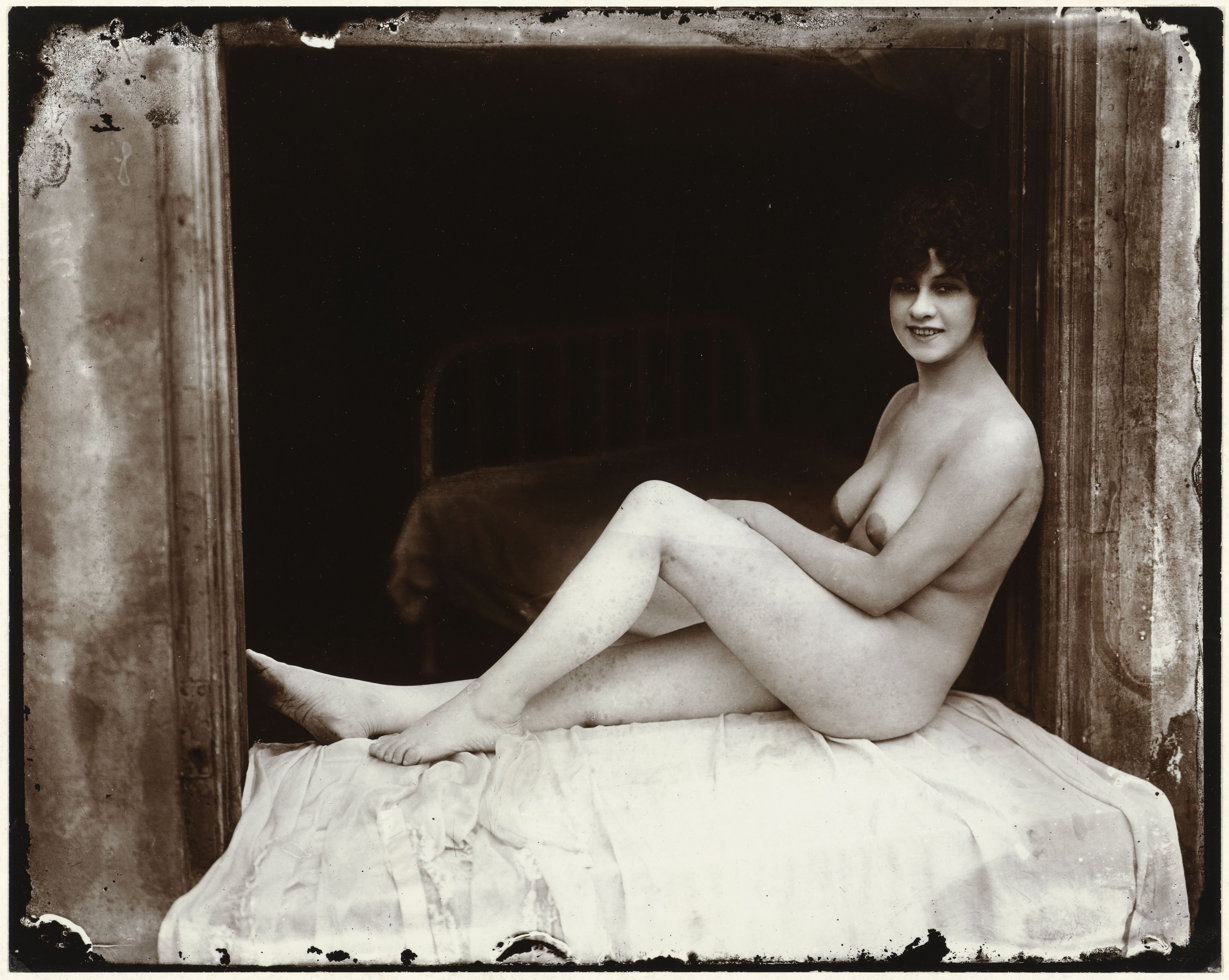
Portrait by Bellocq, c. 1912 (1900–1917)

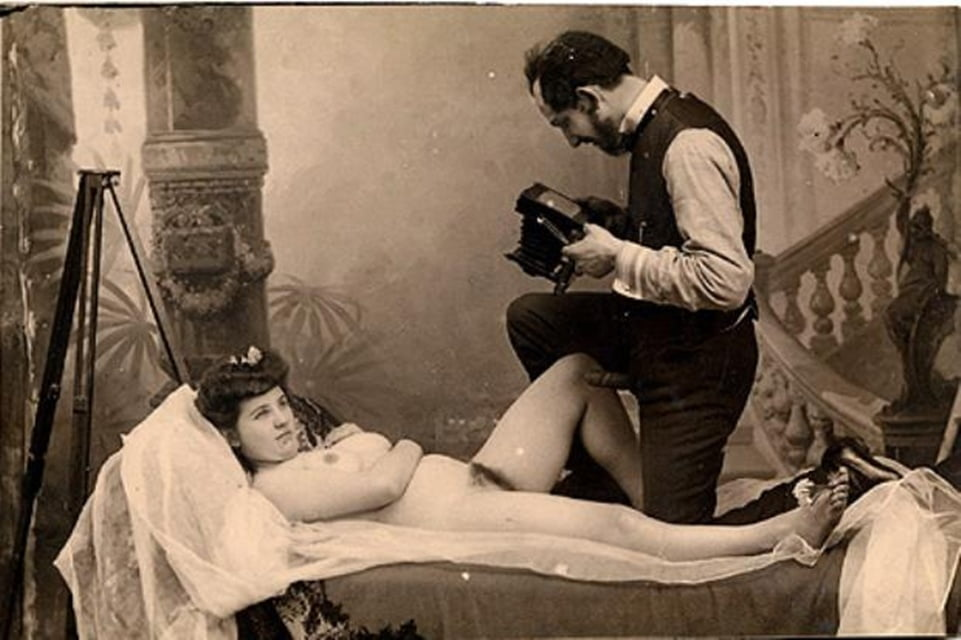
Erotic photography around 1910

The early 1900s saw several important improvements in camera design, including the 1913 invention of the 35 mm or "candid" camera by Oskar Barnack of the Ernst Leitz company. The Ur-Leica was a compact camera based on the idea of reducing the format of negatives and enlarging them later, after they had been exposed. This small, portable device made nude photography in secluded parks and other semi-public places easier, and represented a great advance for amateur erotica. Artists were enamored with their new ability to take impromptu photos without carrying around a clunky apparatus.

Early 20th century artist E. J. Bellocq, who made his best known images with the older style glass plate negatives, is best remembered for his down-to-earth pictures of prostitutes in domestic settings in the Storyville red light district of New Orleans. In contrast to the usual pictures of women awkwardly posed amid drapery, veils, flowers, fruit, classical columns and oriental braziers, Bellocq's sitters appear relaxed and comfortable. David Steinberg speculates that the prostitutes may have felt at ease with Bellocq because he was "so much of a fellow outcast."

Other photographers of nude women of this period include Alexandre-Jacques Chantron, Jean Agélou and Alfred Cheney Johnston. Chantron was already an established painter before experimenting with photography, while Agélou and Johnston made their career in photography.

Julian Mandel (possibly a pseudonym) became known in the 1920s and 1930s for his exceptional photographs of the female form. Participating in the German "new age outdoor movement", Mandel took numerous pictures in natural settings, publishing them through the Paris-based studios of Alfred Noyer and P-C Paris, Les Studios and the Neue Photographische Gesellschaft. The models often are found in highly arranged classical poses, photographed both in-studio and outdoors. The images are composed artfully, with exquisite tones and soft use of lighting—showing a particular texture created by light rather than shadow.

Another noteworthy photographer of the first two decades of the 20th century was the naturist photographer Arundel Holmes Nicholls (1923–2008). His work, featured in the archives of the Kinsey Institute, is artistically composed, often giving an iridescent glow to his figures. Following in Mandel's footsteps, Nicholls favored outdoor shots.

Many photographs from this era were intentionally damaged. Bellocq, for instance, frequently scratched out the faces of his sitters to obscure their identities. Some of his other sitters were photographed wearing masks. Peter Marshall writes, "Even in the relatively bohemian atmosphere of Carmel, California in the 1920s and '30s, Edward Weston had to photograph many of his models without showing their faces, and some 75 years on, many communities are less open about such things than Carmel was then."

In France, the tolerance of nude photography in the early 20th century coincided with the popularity of stereo photography. Stereo photography experienced a revival with the introduction of the compact and affordable Vérascope stereo camera by Jules Richard in 1893. Viewing erotic stereoscopic images through a stereoscope provided an intimate viewing experience.

Jules Richard published more than 7,000 glass stereoviews in the 45 mm × 107 mm (1.8 in × 4.2 in) format, shot in a classic Atrium. Jean Agélou published more than 40 series of paper card stereoviews. During a single posing session with a model, he used a stereo camera for the stereoviews and a normal camera for the French postcards.

== Later 20th century ==
Nude photographers of the mid-20th century include Walter Bird, John Everard, Horace Roye, Harrison Marks and Zoltán Glass. Roye's photograph Tomorrow's Crucifixion, depicting a model wearing a gas mask while on a crucifix caused much controversy when published in the English Press in 1938. The image came to be considered one of the major pre-war photographs of the 20th century.

=== Playboy and Penthouse ===
Playboy magazine, founded in 1953, achieved great popularity and soon established the market for men's and lifestyle magazines. Erotic photography soon became closely associated with it and gained increasing public attention.

Founded in 1965, Penthouse magazine went a step further than Playboy and was the first to clearly display genitals, initially covered with pubic hair. The models looked usually directly into the camera, as if they would enter into relationship with the mostly male viewers.

=== Cleo and male nude ===
In the 1970s, in the mood of feminism, gender equality and light humour, magazines such as Cleo included male nude centrefolds.

Unlike the traditional erotic photographs, which use any attractive female subjects, the male nude photographs are usually of celebrities.

=== Internet ===
The spread of the Internet in the 1990s and increasing social liberalization brought a renewed upsurge of erotic photography. A variety of print and online publications compete against the major magazines (Playboy, Penthouse) and cater for the diverse tastes. There are a large number of online erotic photography sites, some of which describe themselves or are so described by others as pornography.

Modern erotic photography
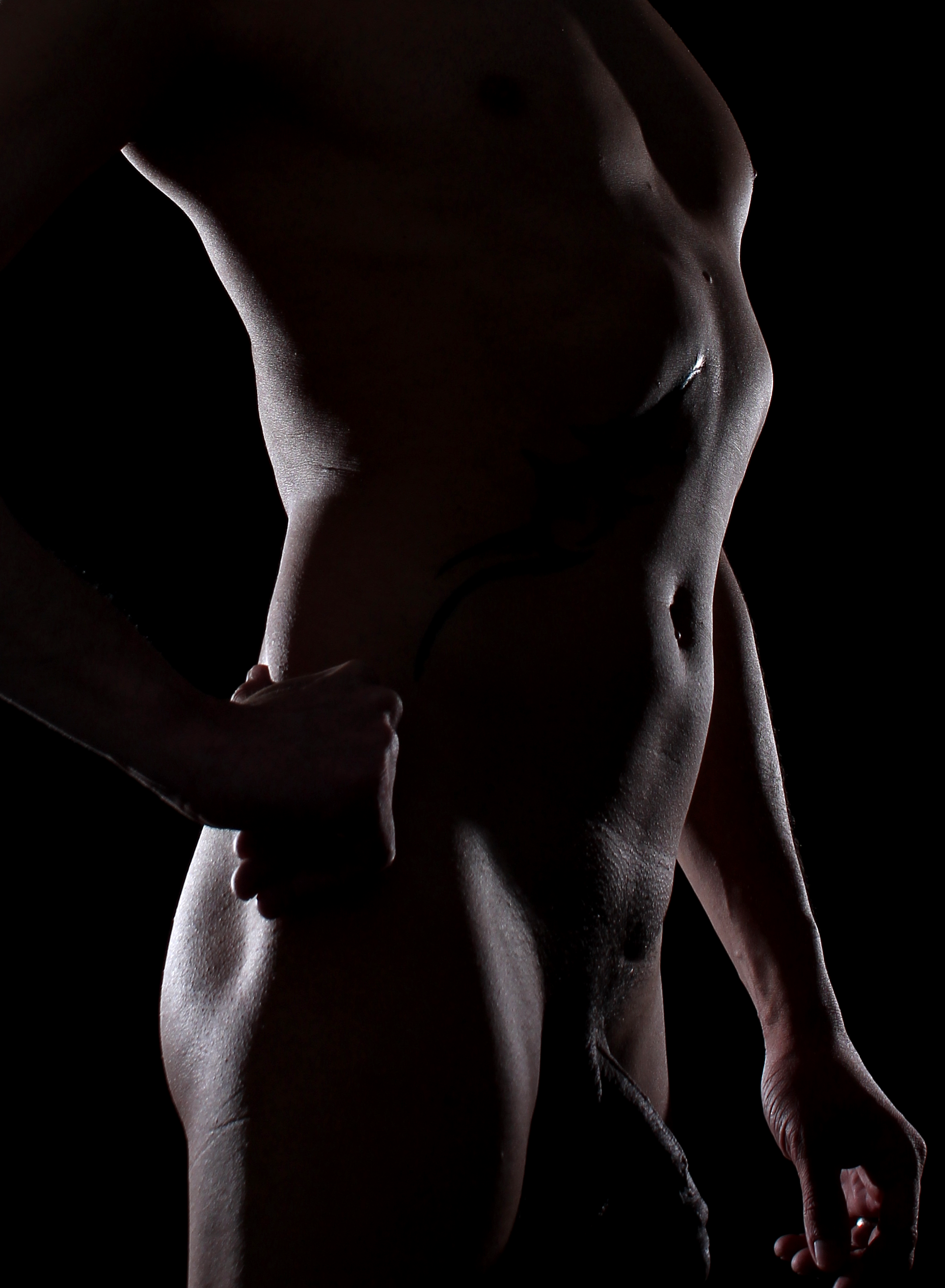
Warrior Male erotic photo by Cosme Madini

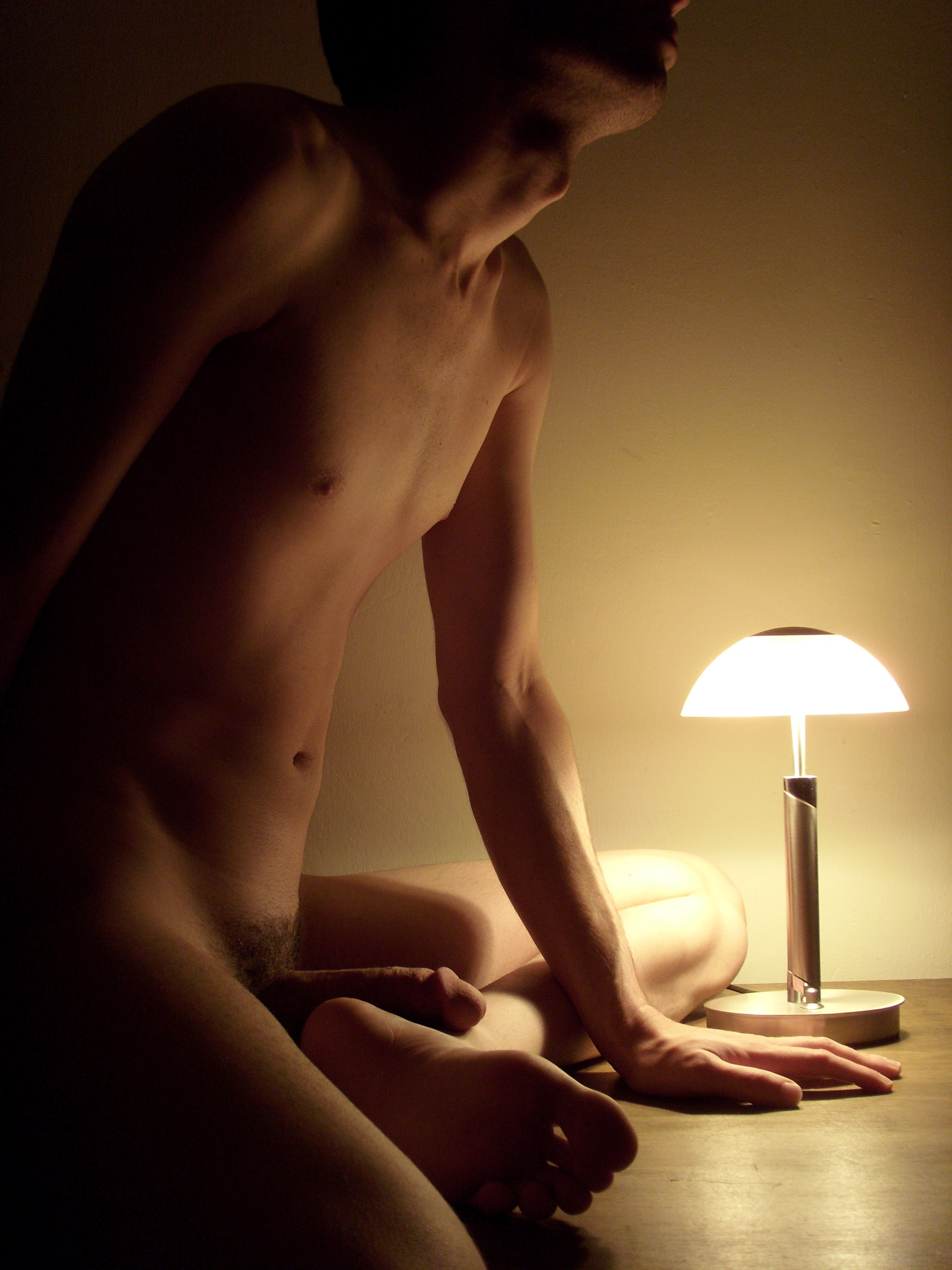
Erotic nude study of a man

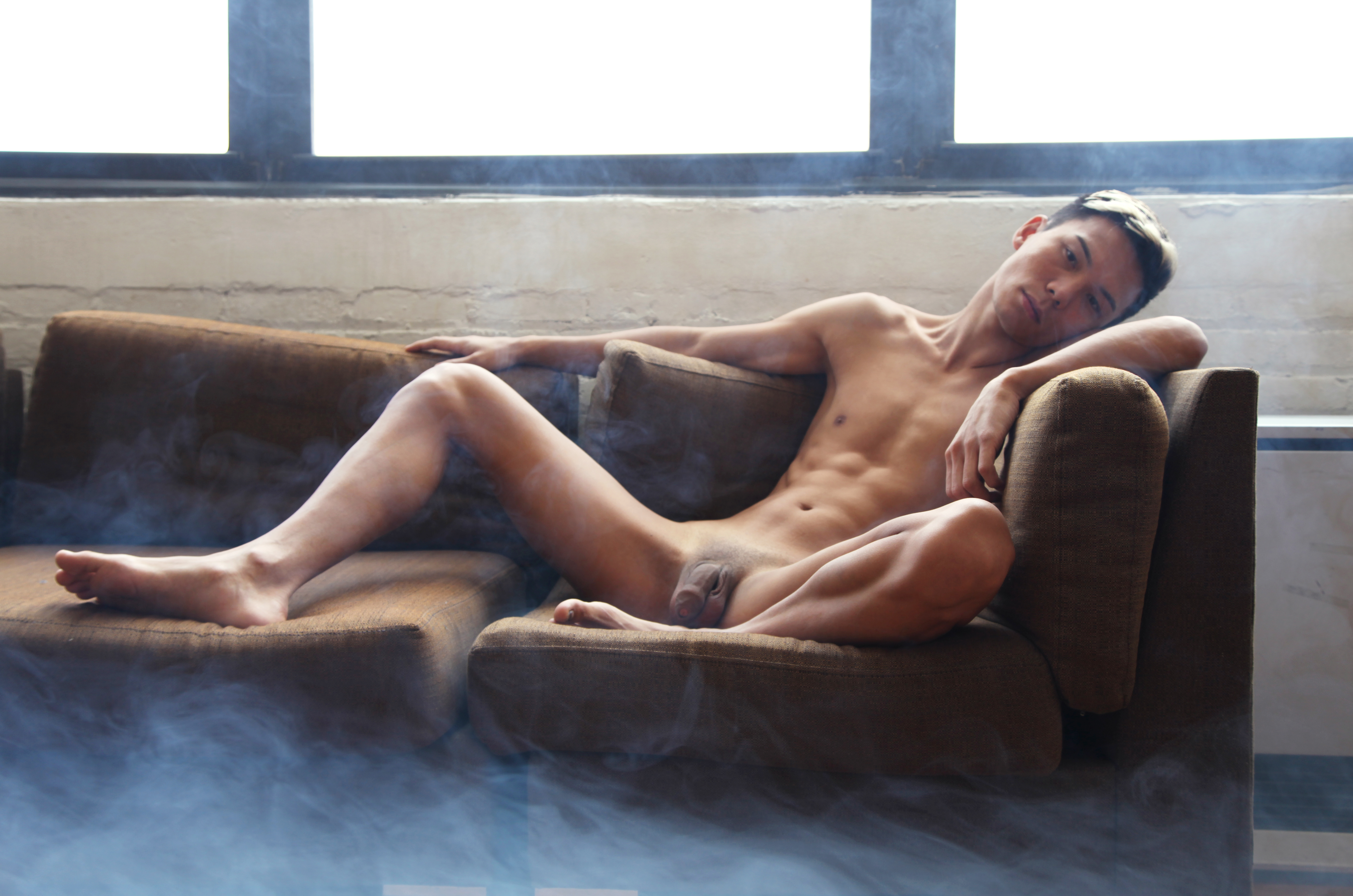
Reclining nude by Alexander Kargaltsev

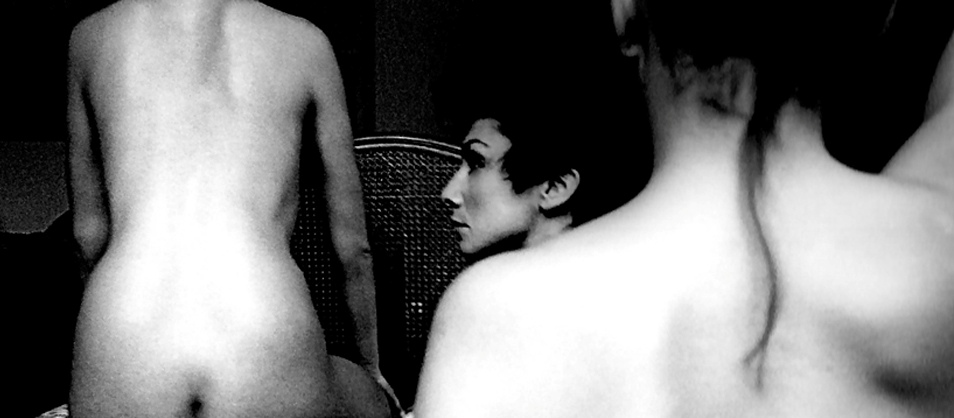
Nude study, 1980 Augusto De Luca

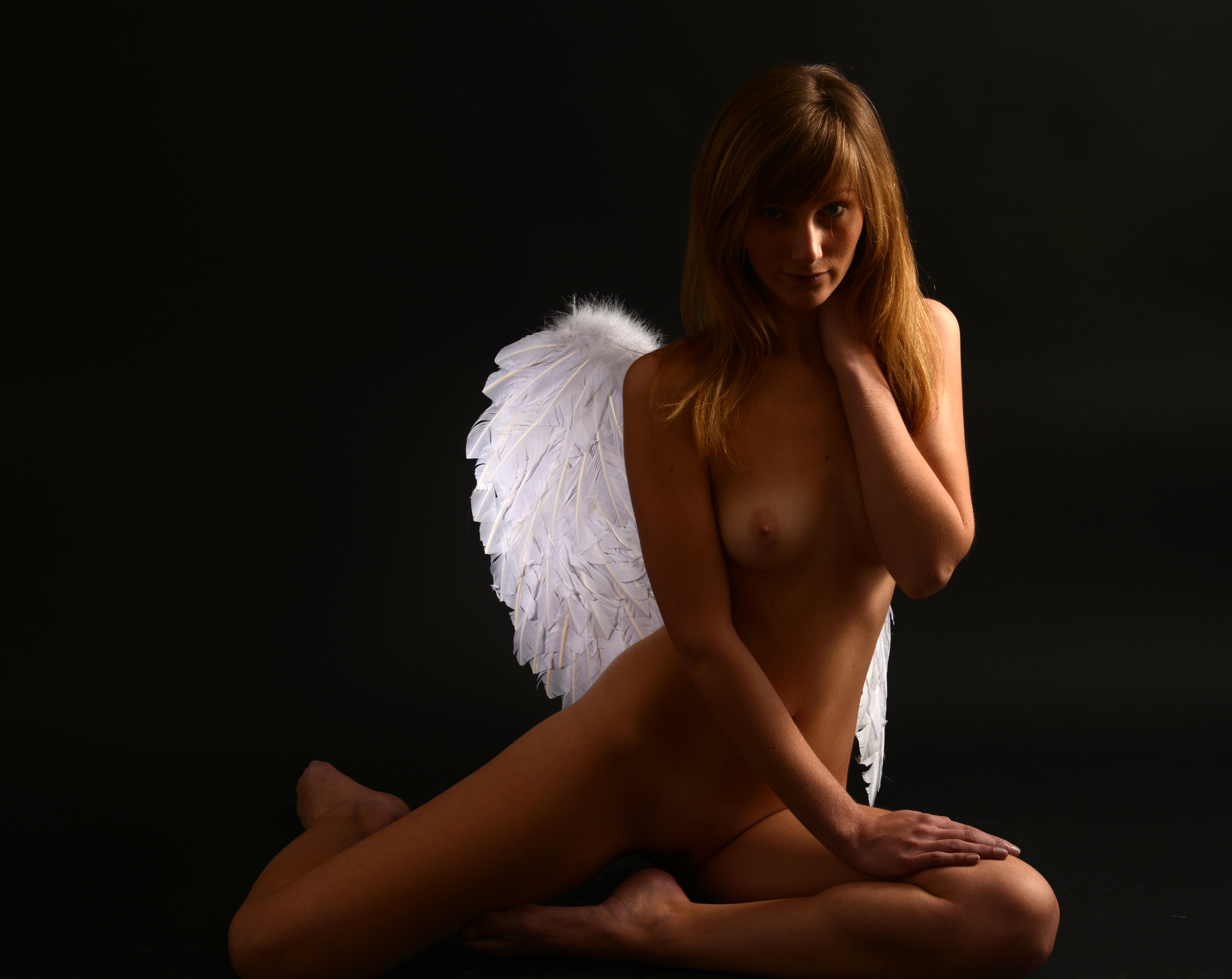
Angel Wings nude photo by Jean-Christophe Destailleur

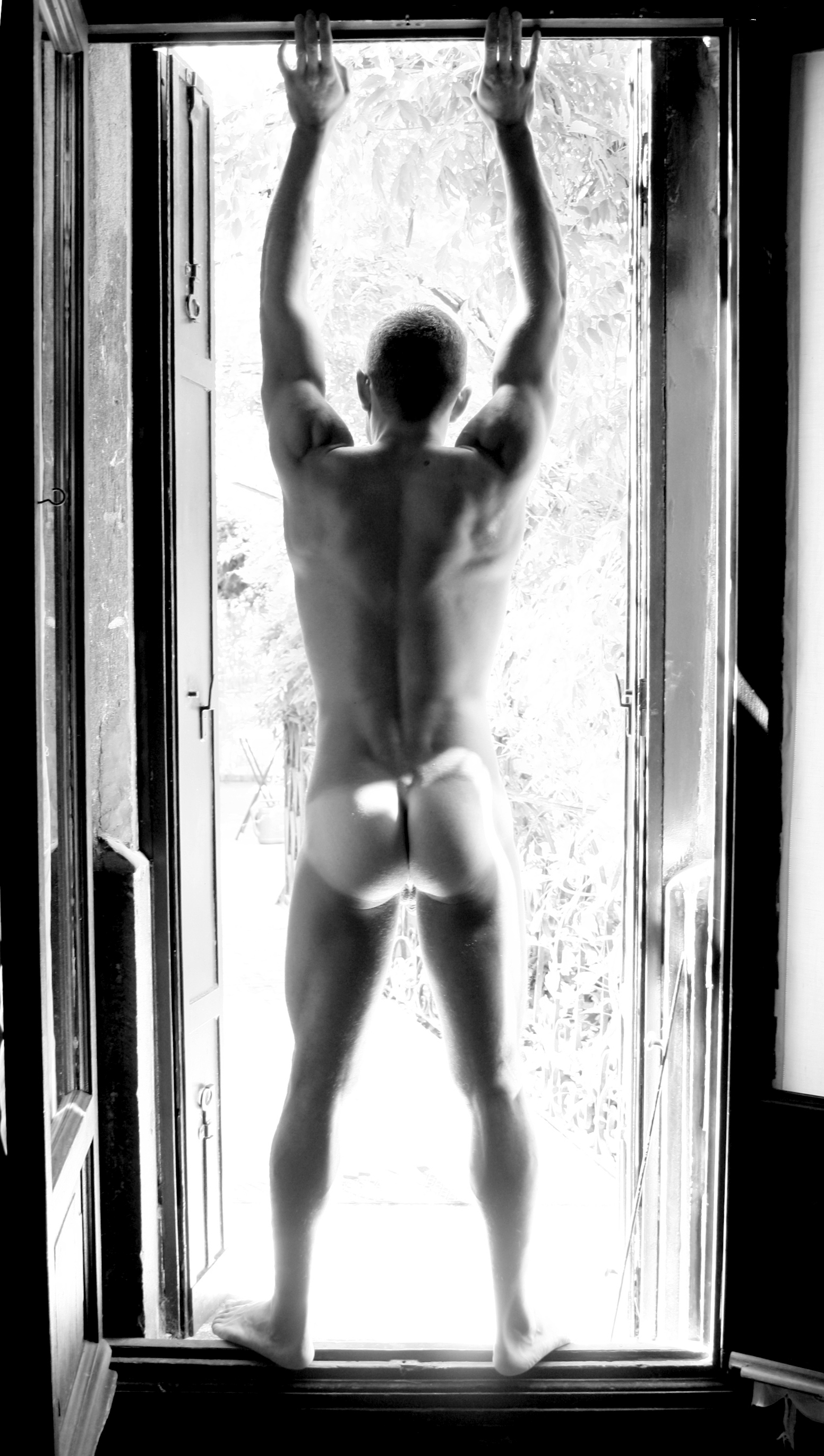
Controluce-5 by Giovanni Dall'Orto

== Examples by decade ==
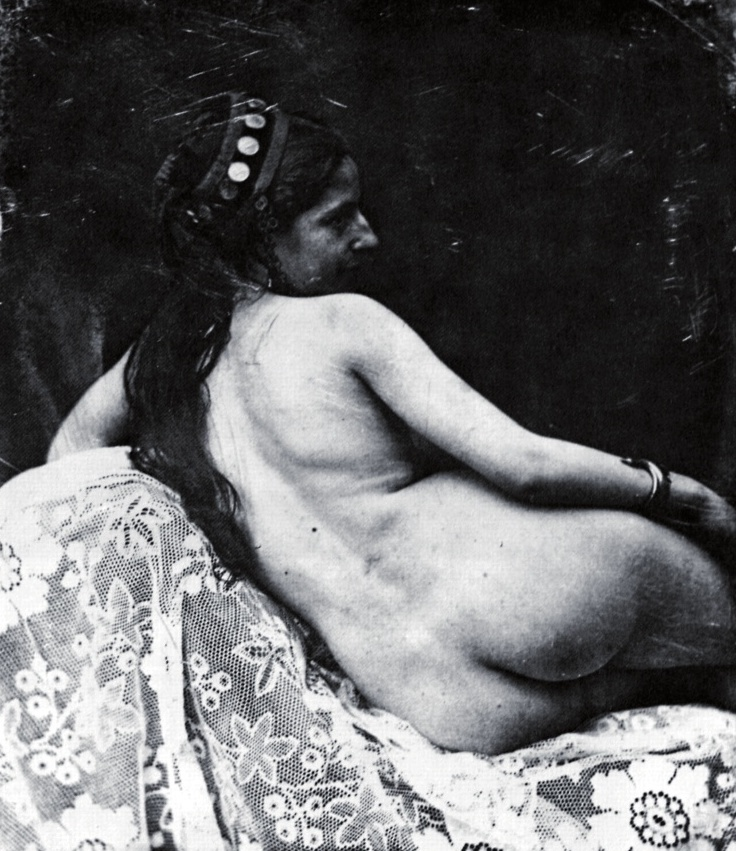
1840s

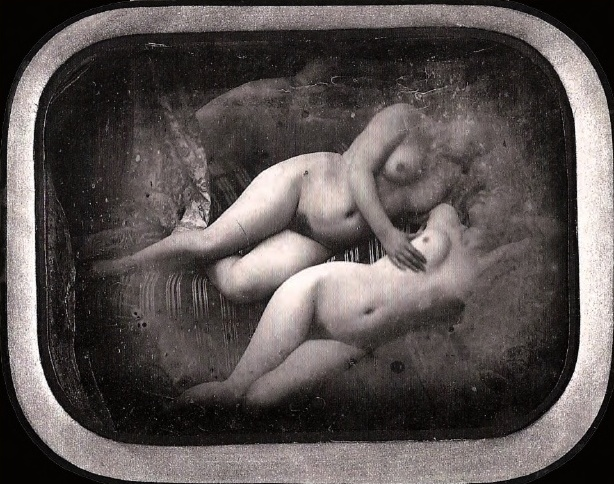
1850s

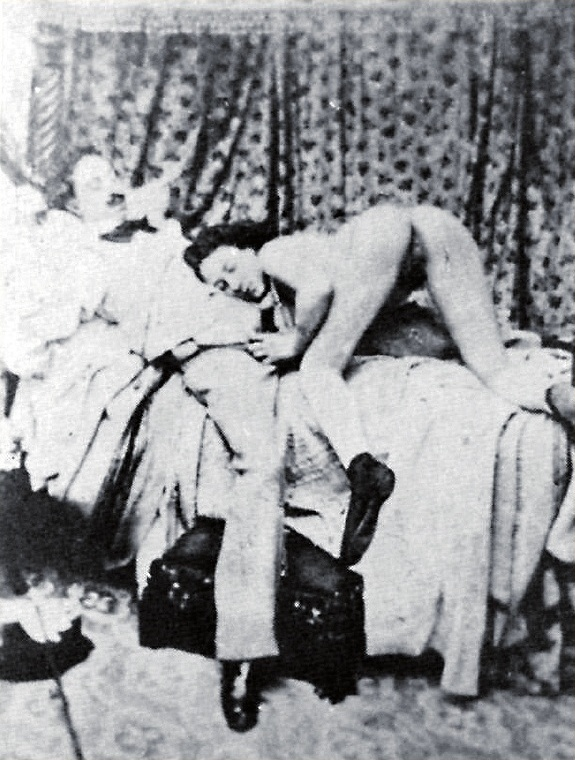
1860s

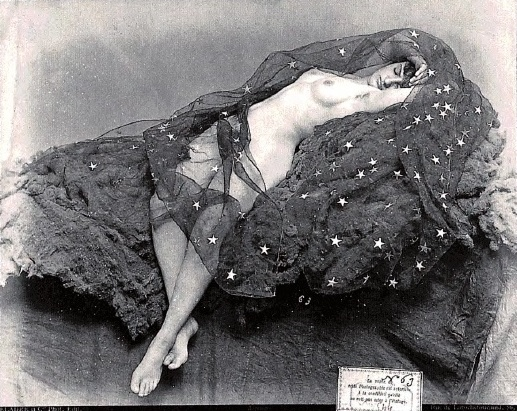
1870s

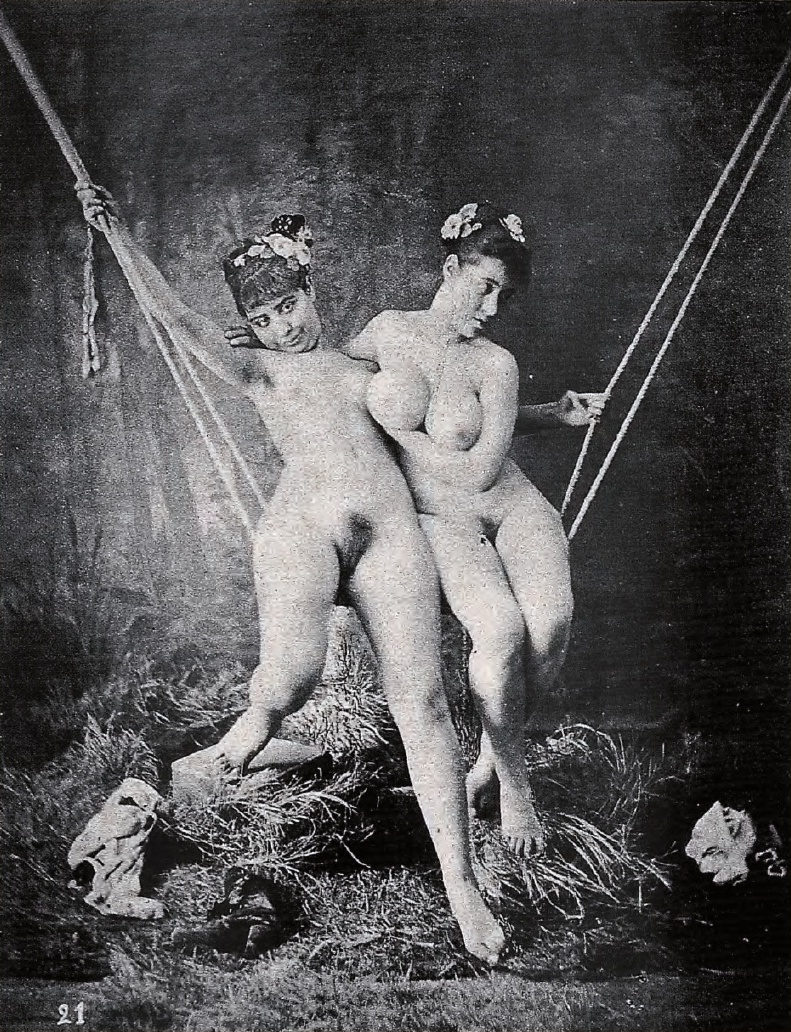
1880s

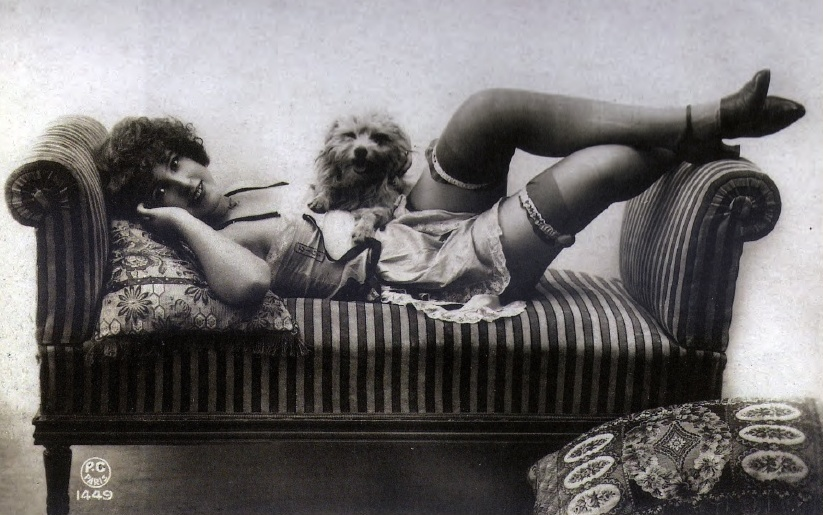
1890s

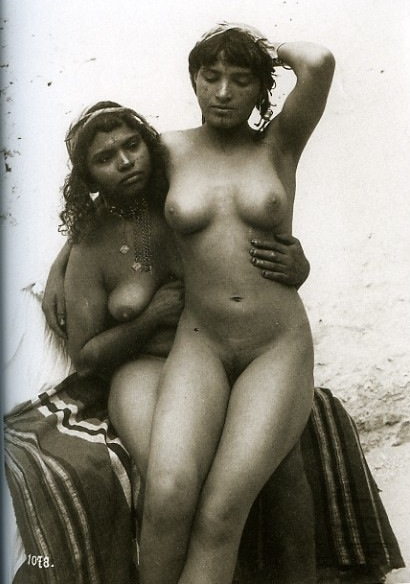
1900s

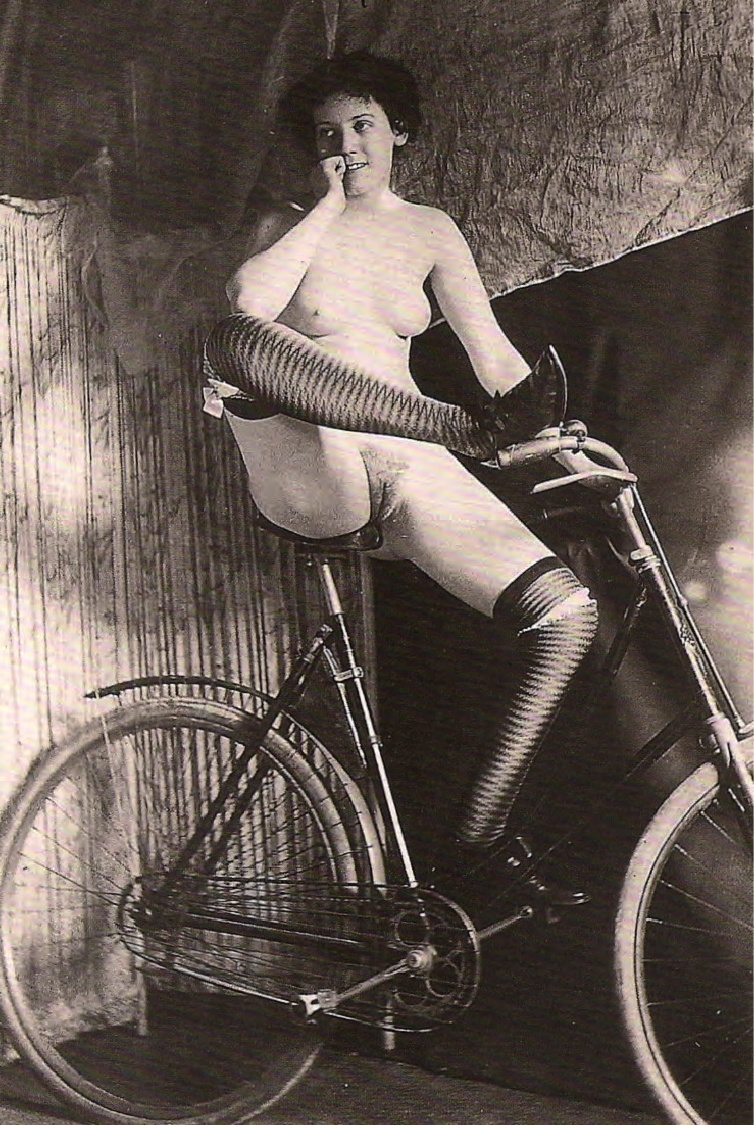
1910s

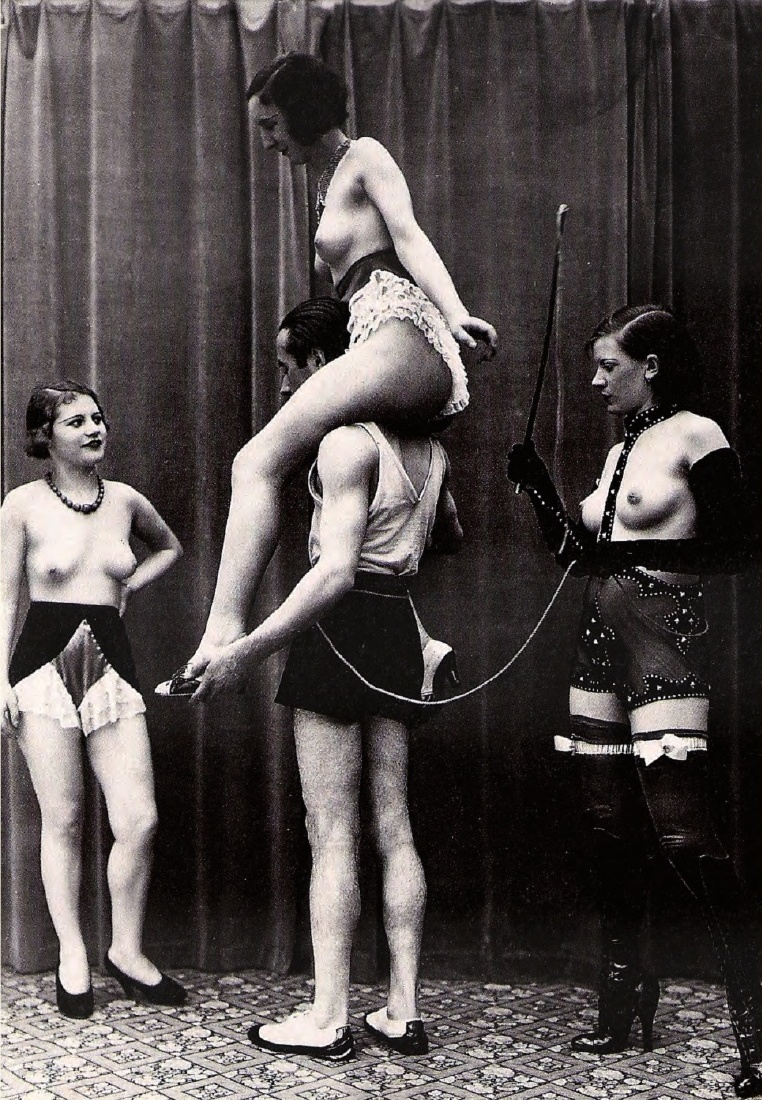
1920s

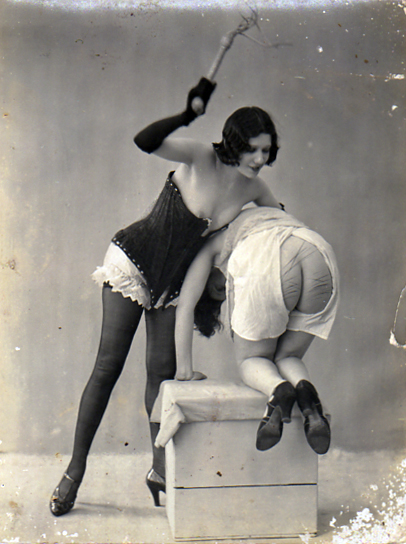
1930s

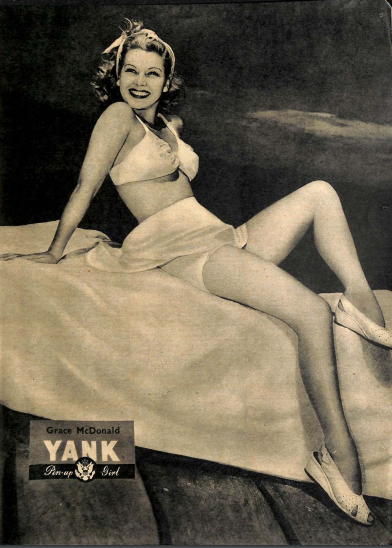
1940s

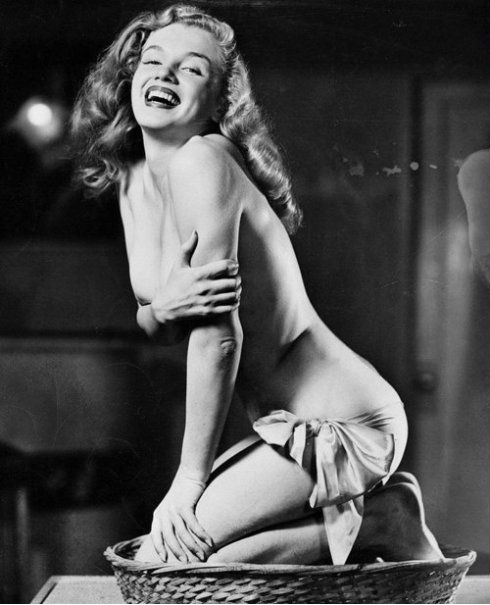
1950s

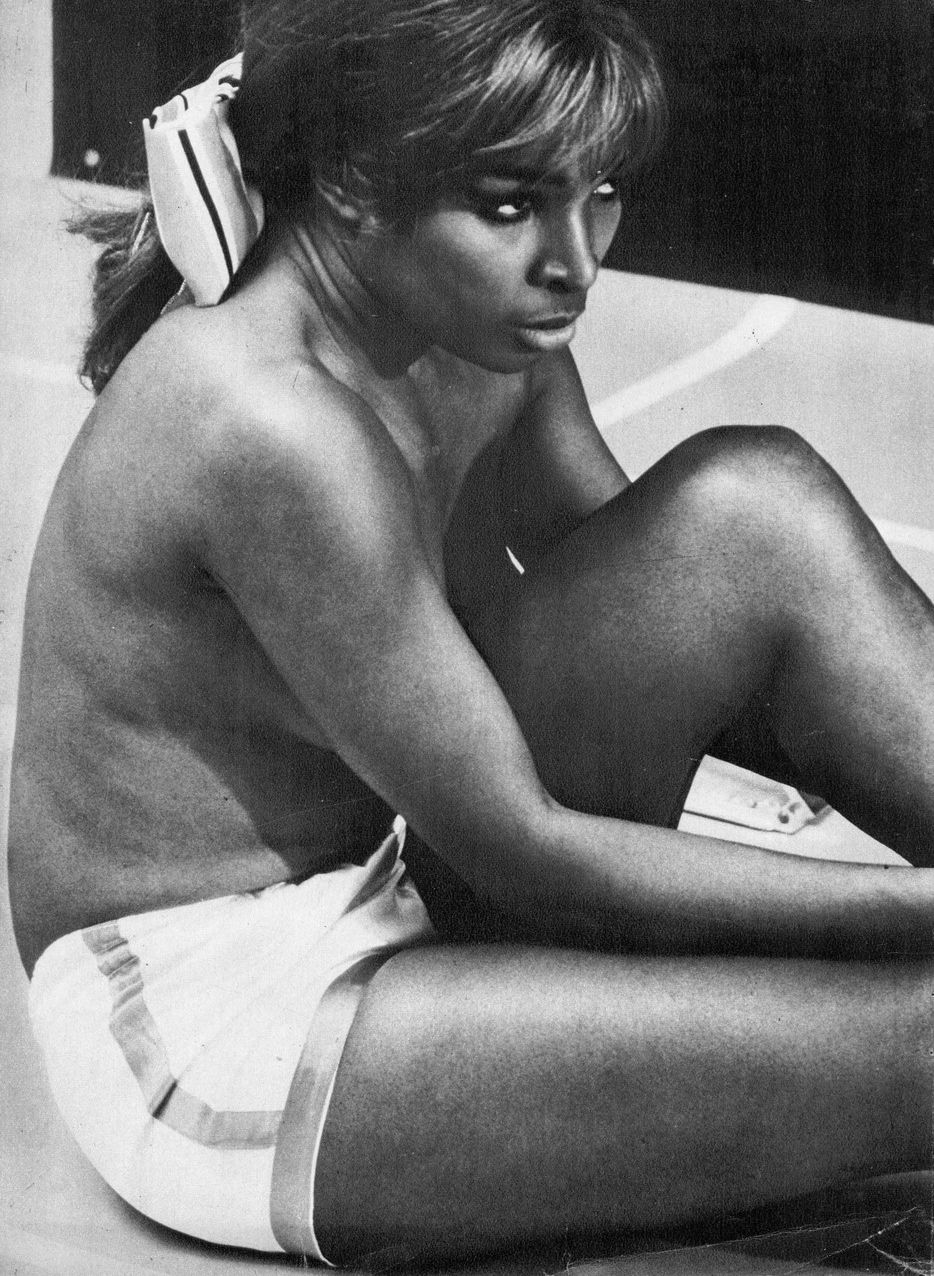
1960s

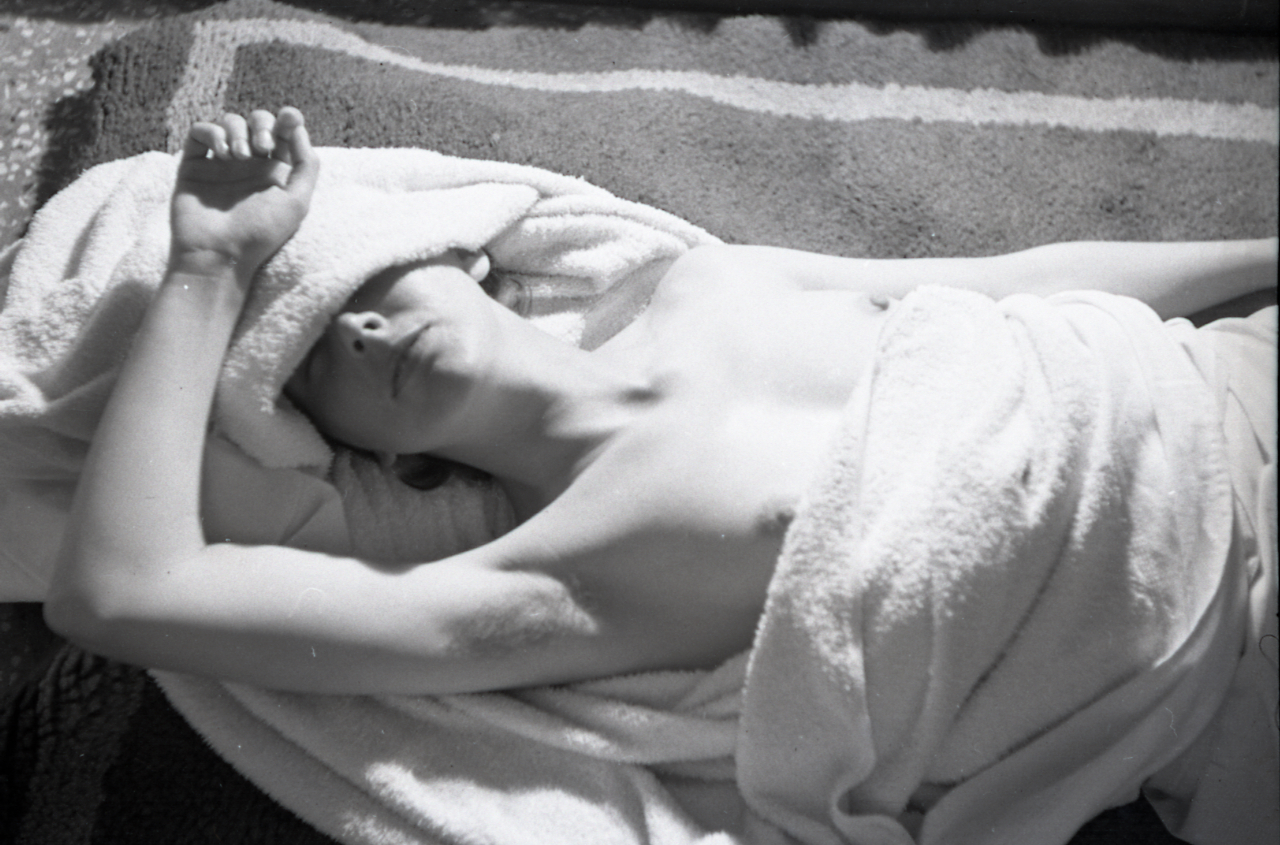
1970s

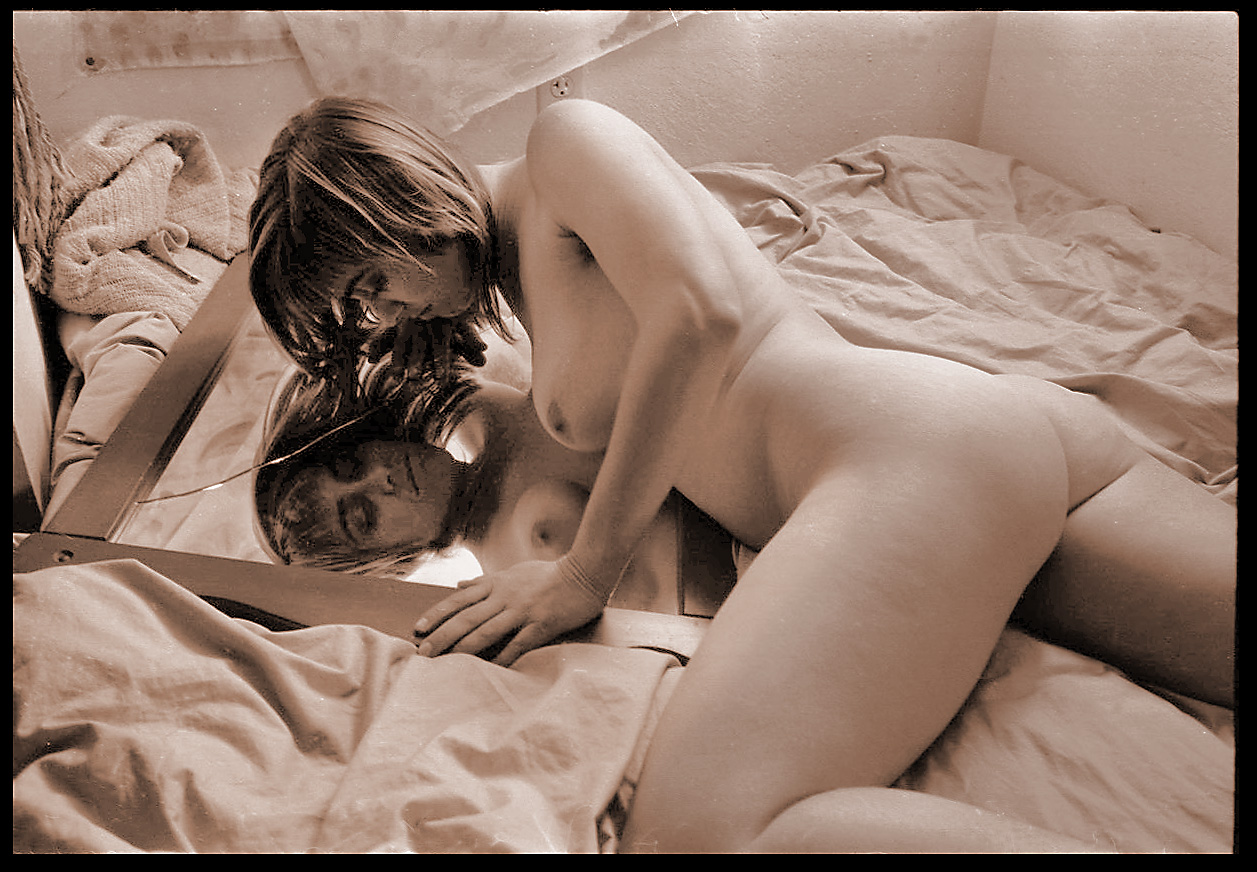
1980s

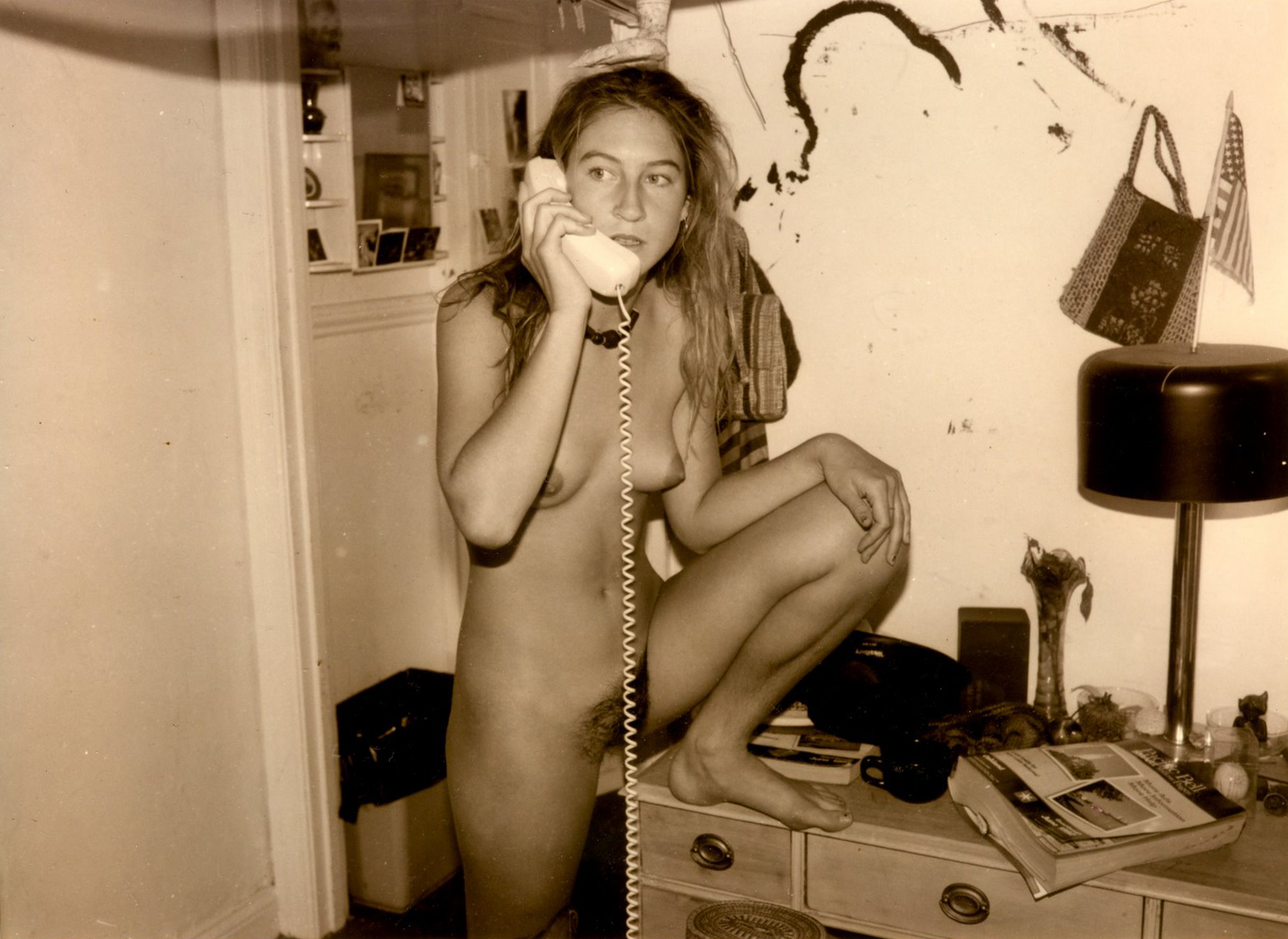
1990s

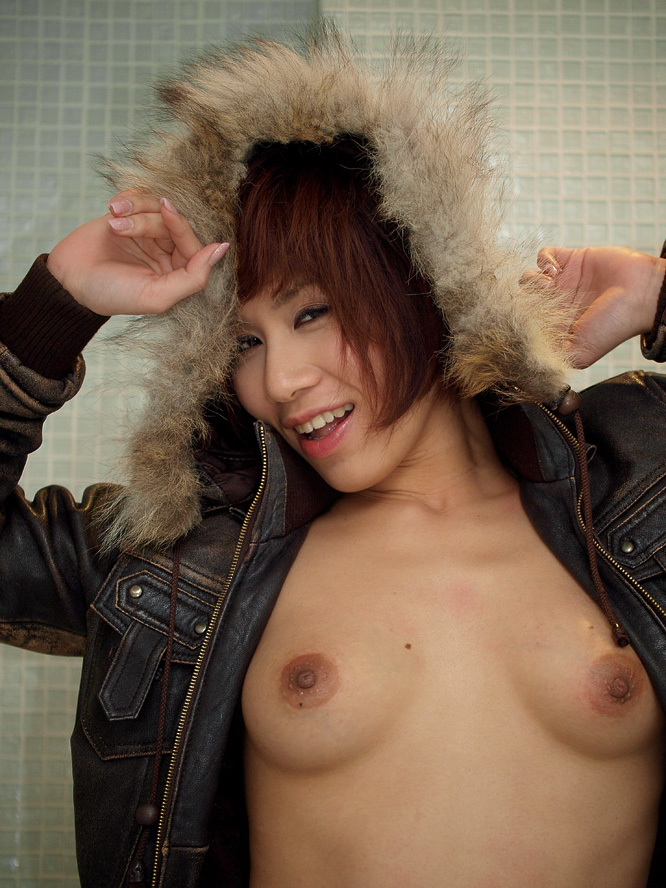
2000s

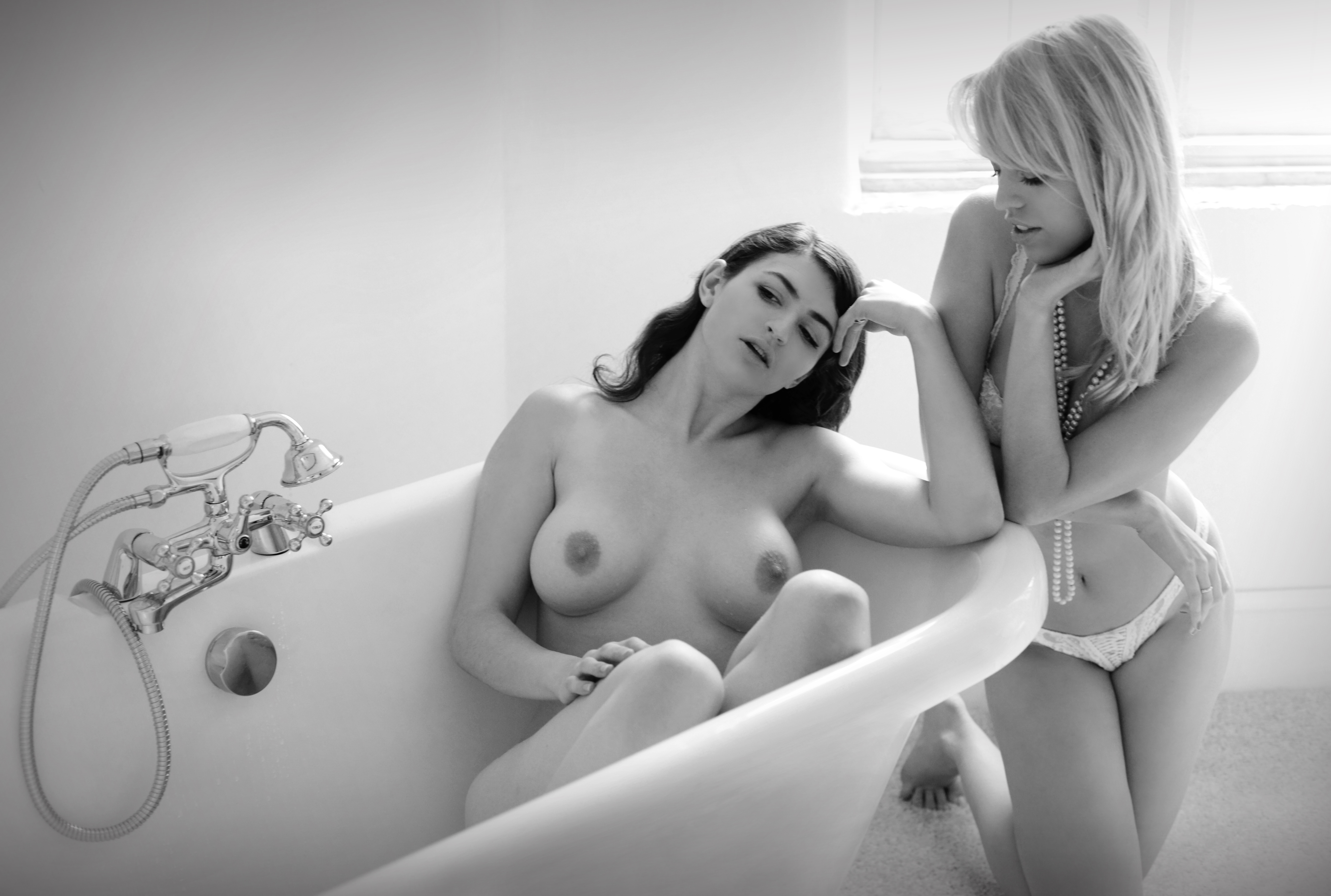
2010s

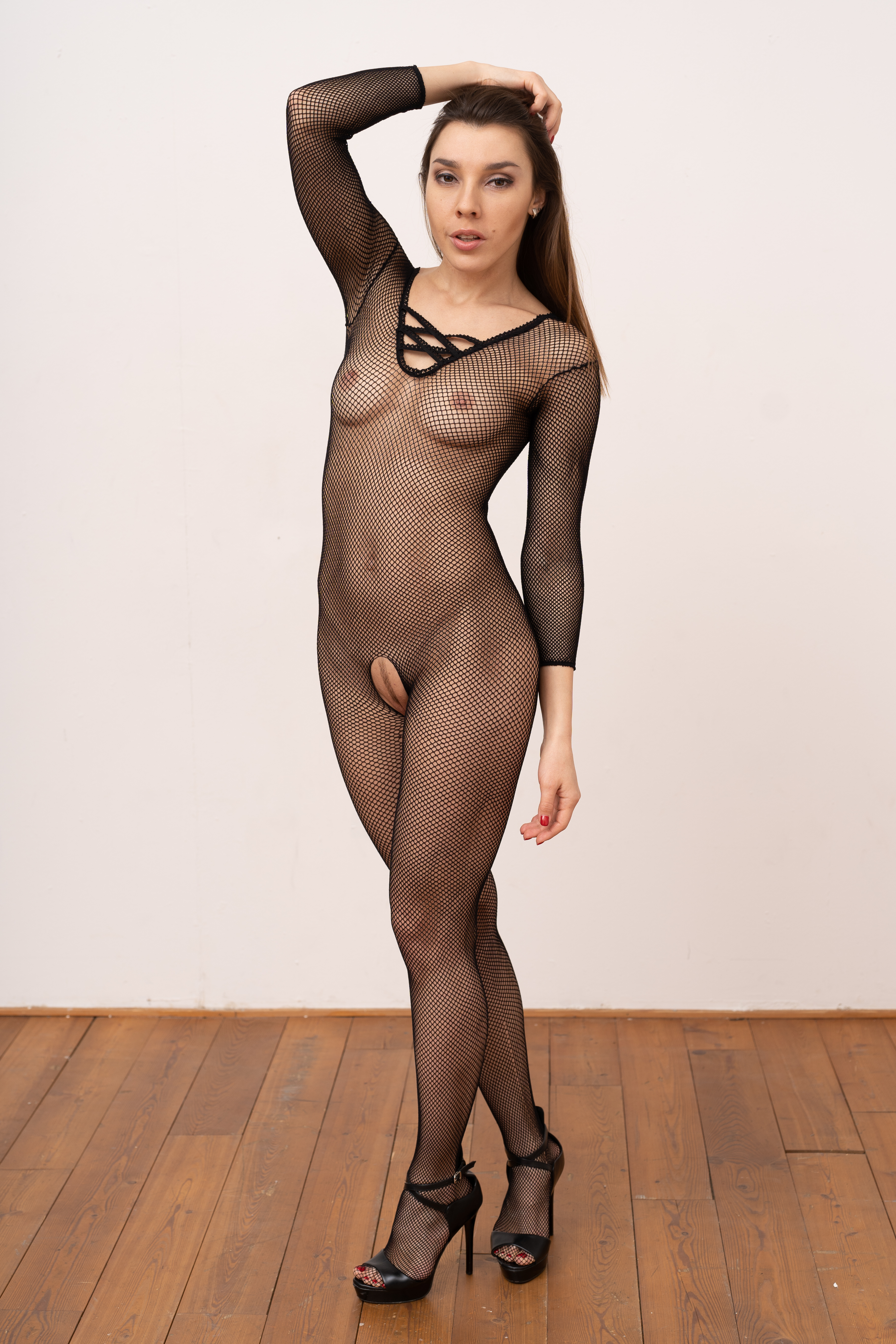
2020s

== See also ==
- Ken Marcus
- Andrew Blake
- Blue Movie by Andy Warhol
- Boudoir photography
- Erotic art
- Erotica
- Fine-art photography
- Glamour photography
- Helmut Newton
- History of erotic depictions
- Michael Ninn
- Fine-art nude photography
- Philip Mond
- Radley Metzger
- Tinto Brass
