= Boudoir photography =

Intimate and sensual photographic style

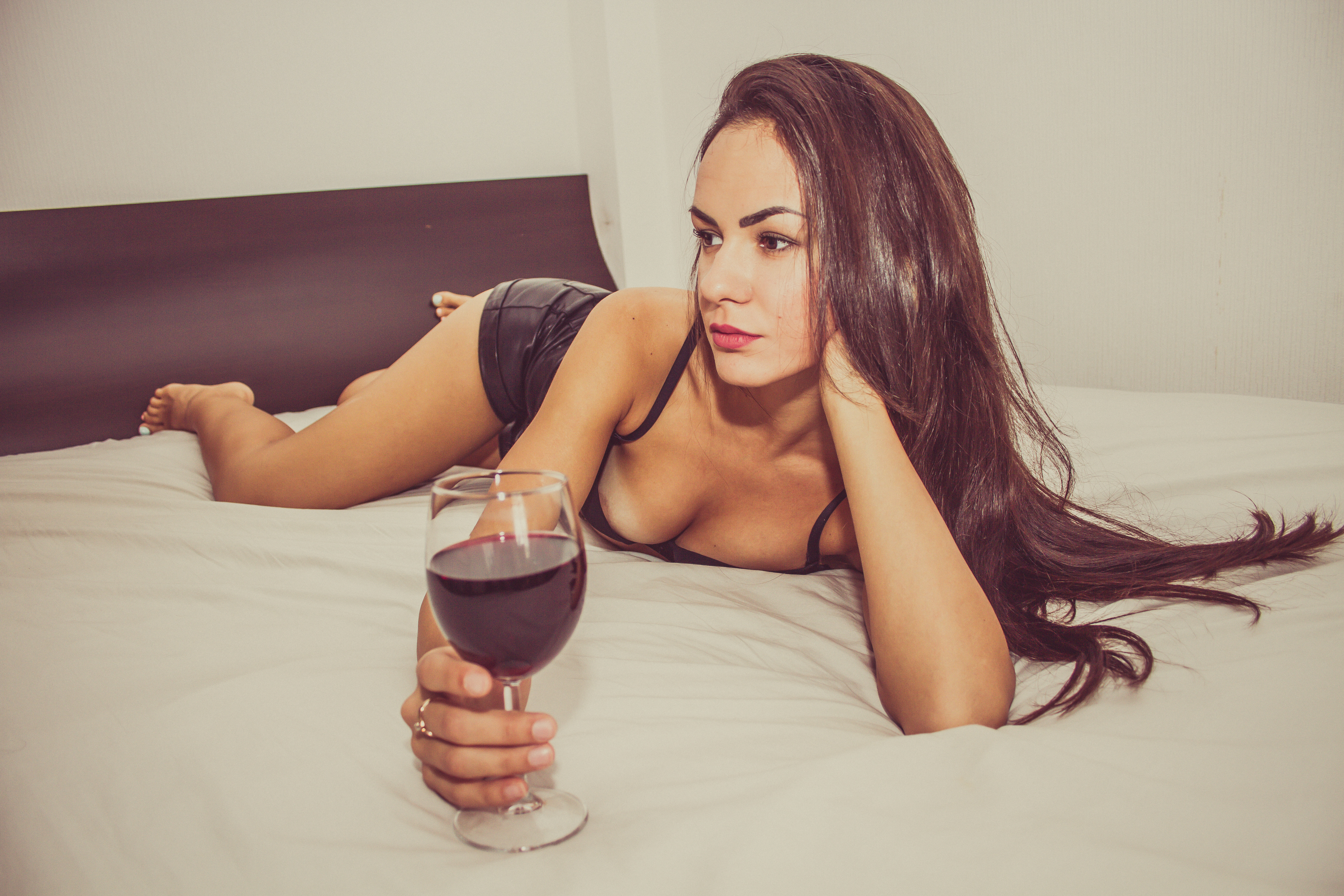
Boudoir photography

Boudoir photography is a photographic style featuring intimate, sensual, romantic, and sometimes erotic images of its subjects in a photographic studio, bedroom or private dressing-room environment, primarily intended for the private enjoyment of the subjects and their romantic partners. It is distinct from glamour and art nude photography in that it is usually more suggestive rather than explicit in its approach to nudity and sexuality, features subjects who do not regularly model, and produces images that are not intended to be seen by a wide audience, but rather to remain under the control of the subject.

Common motivations for boudoir photography shoots include a surprise gift by a bride to their future husband on or before their wedding day, undertaking weight loss regimes or other forms of body alteration (such as breast augmentation or cancer surgery), and as a gift to service persons overseas.

== History ==
The term "boudoir" comes from the French language verb bouder meaning "to sulk" and was primarily attributed to women's dressing rooms or sitting rooms and private salons. Nude or sexualized female forms have been a theme of photography since as early as 1840. Early erotic photography, such as French postcards from the late 19th and early 20th century, 1920s fashion styles, pin-up girls, and Hollywood culture have influenced the visual style of boudoir photography. Notable early artists of the form include Albert Arthur Allen, who photographed larger women against ornate backgrounds.

=== Boudoir pre-WWII ===
Boudoir's first use was in early 20th-century France with upper-class women captured in their private salons. Artistic movements during this time contributed widely to the sensual depictions of women in both public and private spaces. The Art Nouveau and Art Deco movements broke away from previous art movements by emphasizing glamour and natural form, in which boudoir fit in well showcasing feminine beauty. Photography became a more popular medium during this time, allowing boudoir to gain notoriety. Pieces focuses on romantic settings with alluring and intimate backgrounds. These themes follow the stylistic traits of boudoir throughout the 20th and 21st century. Notable photographers during this period are Jacques-Henri Lartigue and Jean Agélou, both of whom focused on erotic subject matter. In early 20th century boudoir was influenced by the Art Deco movement, feminist trends that saw the rise in female artists and subject matters beyond male depictions. The style still remained centered on upper class women and themes of elegance and glamour. Photographers of note during the early 20th century include Alfred Stieglitz, Edward Steichen, and Gertrude Käsebier. These photographers were from the pictorialism movement which moved away from the more scientific use of photography to an artistic expression. Pictorialism influenced boudoir style by expanding the use of photography for pleasure, so subject matters could be an expression of one's sensuality. During this time as women were able to explore roles beyond the home. Female artists like Imogen Cunningham and Dora Maar were able to use common stylistic themes of boudoir to add a feminine take on photography of the era.

=== Boudoir during WWII ===
After the dissolution of the Prohibition Era in 1933 and the beginning of World War II, the US government began using propaganda to encourage young men to fight for their country. With the knowledge that "sex sells", the military began using pin-up girls on their recruiting posters with slogans like "She’s worth fighting for" or "Come home to your girl a hero". This made the pin-up girl one of the most recognizable forms of boudoir and paved the way for modern boudoir by normalizing the female form in advertising. The style of pin up differs from classical boudoir as pin up was used for commercial purposes in advertisements and marketing during the roaring 20's and especially during way eras of WWI and WWII. The golden age of pin up from the 1930s to 1950s with famous magazines such as Esquire and Life playing major roles in the widespread use of pin up photos. Prominent photographer Alberto Vargas led the campaign in his work with Esquire focuses on "Varga Girls" These images would remain a staple of the key stylistic components of pin and boudoir photography throughout the 20th century. Soldiers would keep mementos of pin up photos in their personal supplies to keep up moral. In addition, it became a common form of nose art on military planes for pin up images to be painted on as a way of identifying groups, and maintaining individuality.

Known for her "million dollar legs", actress Betty Grable was the icon of pin-up girls in the 1930s and '40s. One of her most famous portraits was distributed to over five million troops during WWII. Not only was she known as one of the first women to take out insurance on a body part, she was also known for being one of the highest paid female actors in Hollywood during her time. Other examples of boudoir from that era include images of Clara Bow, Mae West and Jean Harlow.

=== Boudoir in the 21st century ===
Boudoir photography was popularized in the millennium with the arrival of digital photography. It became popular with women seeking to create a private collection of professional studio portraits. This is a deviation from 20th century uses which had a more commercial presence in magazines and advertisements. Boudoir photography dates from the mid-1980s onwards, and is characterized by the empowerment of its female subjects, who now are typically the photographer's direct clients rather than being hired models. While traditionally associated with women, male boudoir photography has become more popular. Private sessions typically are formatted with a photographer and one subject, with other parties present to aid in the comfort of the subject. Sessions can be in the studio of the photographer or any place the subject feels comfortable like their home. Common outfits worn during sessions can be lingerie, costumes, or completely nude depending on the client.

== Appeal ==
It is common for women to have boudoir photographs of themselves made as a gift to a partner, conventionally on the occasion of their engagement, marriage, pregnancy or before an enforced separation such as a military deployment. In the United Kingdom, it became popular for brides-to-be to commission photoshoots as a wedding gift for the groom. Boudoir photography is also sometimes given as a gift with the intention of re-affirming and encouraging the romance and sensuality between partners in a long-term relationship.

Increasingly, boudoir photography is seen as something that a person might do purely for their own enjoyment, for the pleasure and affirmation of seeing themselves as attractive, daring, sensual, and sexually desirable. This has led to boudoir photography becoming an outlet through which one can increase their self-image and promote body positivity.

== Styles ==
Boudoir photography encompasses a range of styles, moods and levels of undress. Levels of undress in boudoir photography include classic lingerie, implied, artistic and erotic.

Visually the genre is characterized by diffuse high-key images that flatter the appearance of skin, short focal distances, and shallow depth of field, which together impart an intimate, "dreamy" mood. Other common styles include a low-key, deliberately grainy black-and-white, reflecting the influence of art nudes, early erotic photography, and film noir. Also common are poses and lighting setups intended to replicate the mood and appearance of classic pin-up photographs and paintings.

== Feminism ==
The motives behind engaging in boudoir photography vary from person to person. Common motives include women intending to gift the session photos to her partner, documentation of a place in time for the subject, and the personal experience of boudoir. Modern uses of boudoir have been linked to increase self empowerment, comfort in one's sexuality, and more positive self image. Studies on the mental effects of boudoir are structured around interviews with boudoir photographers and subjects. A key part of boudoir sessions is a consultation before the shoot where all parties can communicate comfort levels of clothing, settings, and poses. Subjects and photographers of boudoir have indicated that boundaries can, and commonly do, change during the shoot as comfort levels shift.

Women's choices to present themselves through boudoir photography or to sexually subjectify themselves are said to be tied to wider "technologies of sexiness"—such as the normalization of pole dancing and sexting—and to postfeminist claims that women freely choose their roles and behaviors in contemporary culture.

== See also ==
- Erotic photography
- Pin-up girl
