= French postcard =

19th-century erotic cards

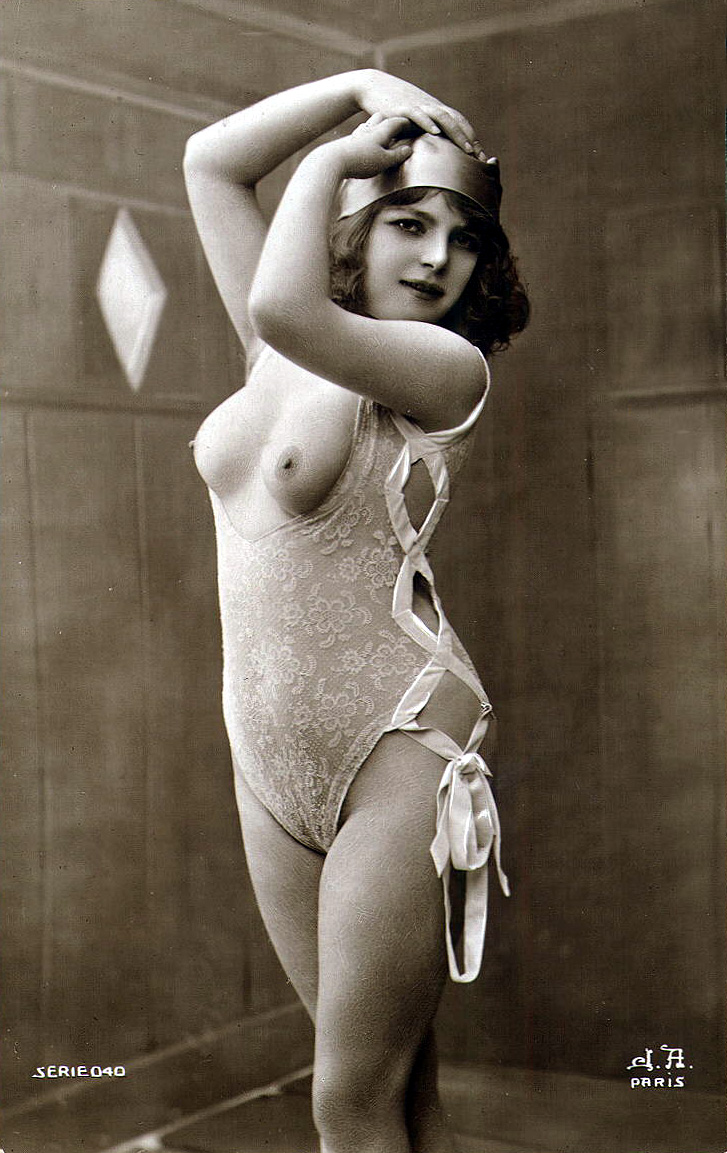
A French postcard by photographer Jean Agélou featuring possibly Fernande Barrey

A French postcard is a small, postcard-sized piece of cardstock featuring a photograph of a nude or semi-nude woman; the term is mainly American. Such erotic cards were produced in great volume, primarily in France but also throughout Europe, in the late 19th and early 20th century. The term was adopted in the United States, where such cards were not legally made. The cards were sold as postcards, but the primary purpose was not for sending by mail, as they would have been banned from delivery. The cards sometimes depicted naked lesbians.

French postcards featured both photographic and illustrated nudity, sexual activity, and sexual symbolism. Prominent illustrators of such cards included Xavier Sager and Georges Mouton.

French postcards circulated worldwide and were reprinted in Chinese publications such as Eyebrow Talk and Pei-yang Pictorial News.

== See also ==
- Nude calendar
