= Jean Agélou =

French photographer (1878–1921)

- Born: 16 October 1878; Alexandria, Khedivate of Egypt
- Died: 2 August 1921 (aged 42); Gien, France
- Occupation: Photographer

Jean Agélou (16 October 1878 – 2 August 1921) was a French photographer of the 1910s and 1920s, best known for his erotic and nude photographs made at the beginning of the 20th century. Agélou was born in Alexandria, Egypt, in October 1878.

Christian Bourdon and Jean-Pierre Bourgeron, major collectors of postcards, have endeavored to collect as complete a collection of his work as they could.

== Biography ==
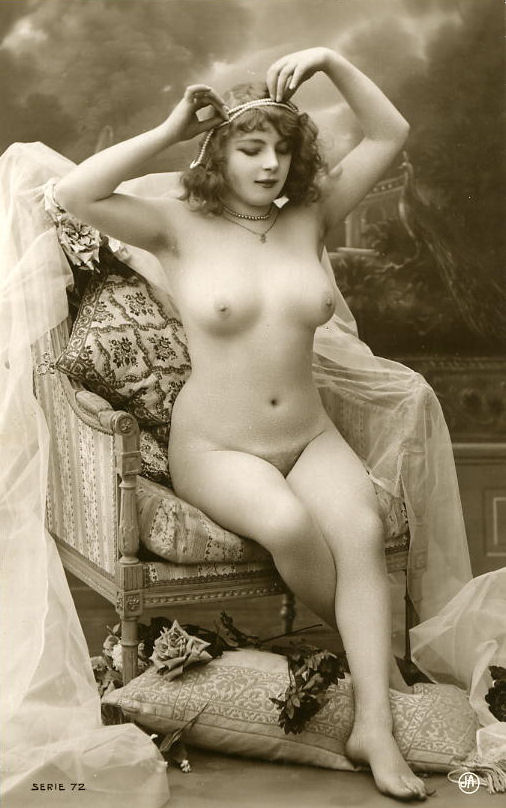
A photograph of Fernande taken by Agélou (1910s)

Not much is known about Agélou's private life, except that after 1908 Fernande was his lover and model. She was a prostitute whose full name is sometimes believed to be Fernande Barrey (1893–1960). The latter would also model for painters Amedeo Modigliani and Chaïm Soutine, and would also become a painter in her own right.

The 1900s marked a golden age of erotic photography, but photographers still had to exercise discretion and he signed his works "JA". It took a long time before the true name of "JA" became known.

He began publishing his work in the magazine L'Étude académique, which was theoretically intended for artists, but that had 20,000 subscribers, and subsequently published his own postcards. The age of his models ranged from 20 to 24 years, and one was only 14 years, which was legal under the law of 16 March 1899. Besides postcards, Agélou also produced stereoscopic images, although these are more rare. He photographed with both a regular camera and a stereo camera during a session with a model.

Nudity in photographs was banned in France on 7 April 1908. Nudity disappeared from all journals and stock images were retouched, a veil or small providential panties were added and pubic hairs were brushed out. Nude images began to circulate clandestinely and producers had to act with discretion. Erotic pictures of Fernande were cherished by soldiers on both sides of the First World War. Erotic postcards and magazines had to be sold or shipped in sealed envelopes. Agélou's original nude prints became available again in the early 1970s, except in Japan where they were still banned.

Jean Agélou died in 1921 in a car accident with his brother George, at the age of 42 years. George had taken care of business aspects and Jean found the models and did the photography. The photographs were made in the studio and natural light, the backdrops were made by painters who painted the decors.

== See also ==
- Erotic photography

== Bibliography ==
- Bourdon, Christian (2006). Marval (ed.). Jean Agélou: De l'académisme à la photo de charme (in French). París. ISBN 978-2862343945.
