= Alexandre-Jacques Chantron =

French artist (1842–1918)

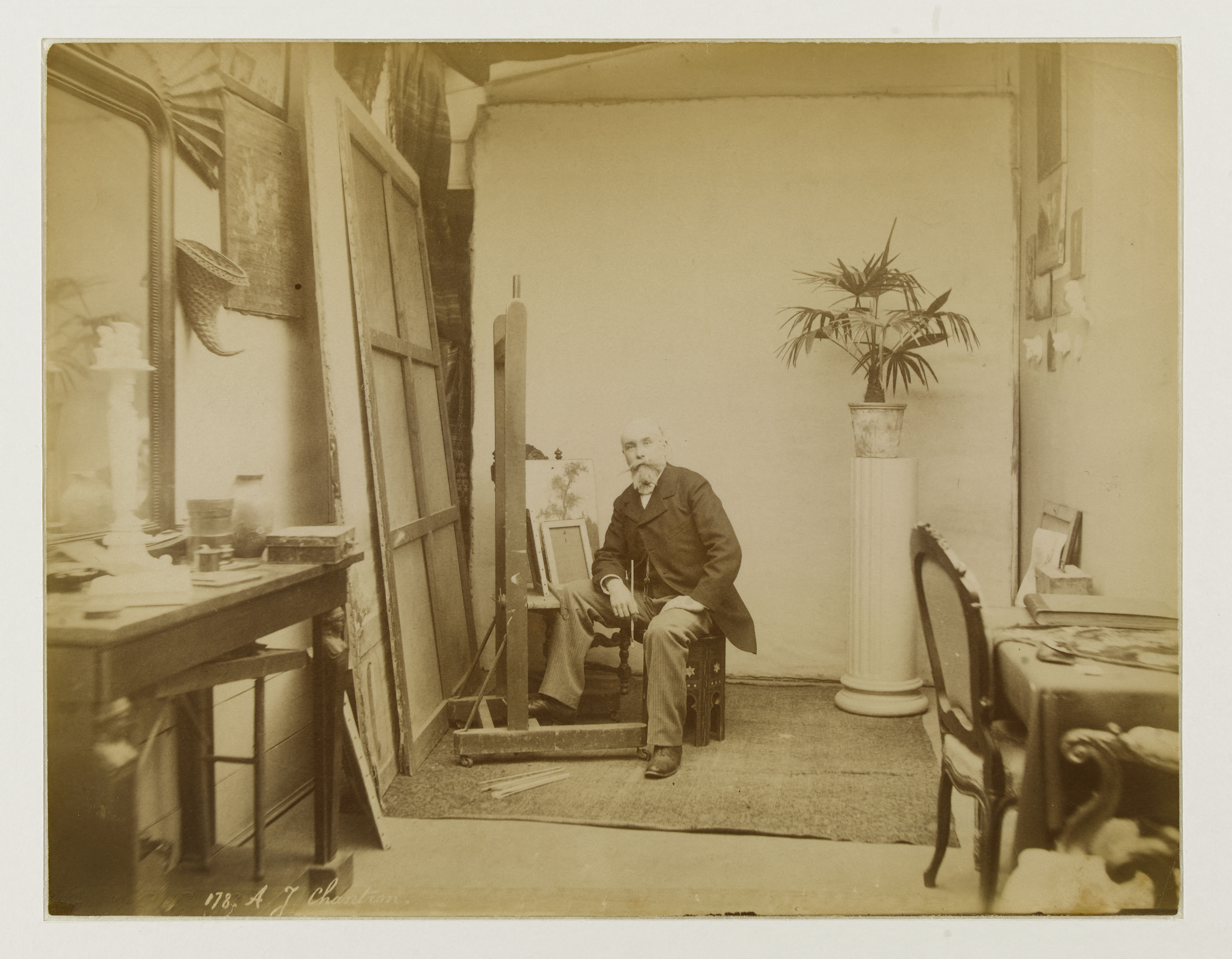
- Born: 28 January 1842; Nantes, France
- Died: 1918 (aged 75–76); Nantes, France
- Education: Paris Salon

Alexandre Jacques Chantron (28 January 1842 – 1918) was a French artist from the Western city of Nantes. His early work consisted mainly of portraits and still lives, and later he took to painting nude studies in the manner of Bouguereau, a theme he continued to develop while experimenting with the fledgeling photographic technology of the day.

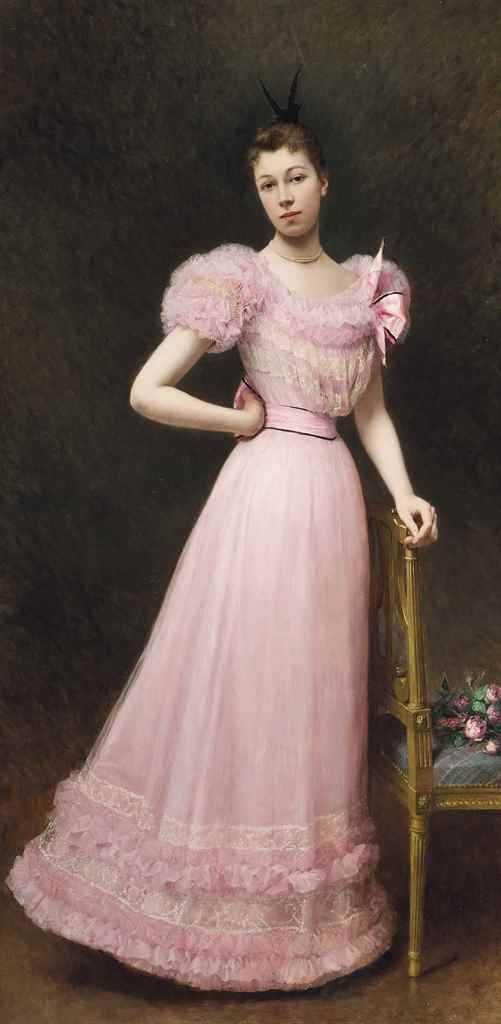
Preparing for the Ball

Chantron was a pupil of François-Édouard Picot, Tony Robert-Fleury and William-Adolphe Bouguereau. He entered the Paris Salon in 1877 with a religious subject, and gained an honorable mention in 1893. He exhibited Fleurs de printemps at the Salon in 1895. He was awarded a third class medal in 1899, and a second class medal in 1902 for his painting Feuilles Mortes.

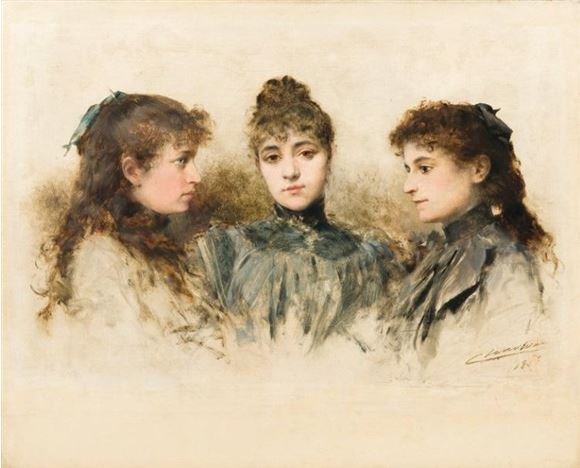
Portrait de femmes
