= Fernande Barrey =

French model, painter and sex-worker

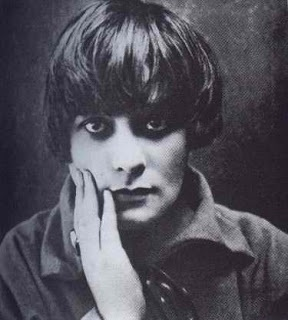
- Fernande Barrey circa 1915
- Born: 9 January 1893; Saint-Valery-sur-Somme, France
- Died: 17 July 1960 (aged 67); Paris, France
- Occupations: Artist model; painter
- Spouse: Tsuguharu Fujita (m. 1917–1926)

Fernande Barrey (9 January 1893 in Saint-Valery-sur-Somme – 17 July 1960 in Paris) was a French artist model and painter.

== Biography ==
Fernande Barrey left her native Picardy in about 1908 and moved to Paris, where she survived as a child prostitute. She then became the model for many painters, including Amedeo Modigliani and Chaïm Soutine, who persuaded her to study painting and art history at the École nationale supérieure des Beaux-Arts.

In March 1917, she met the Japanese artist Tsuguharu Foujita at the Café de la Rotonde in Montparnasse, who fell madly in love with her and married her thirteen days later. In 1918 the couple moved to escape the German bombs to Cagnes-sur-Mer, where she spent a year painting and meeting many friends. During this period, she became friends with Jeanne Hébuterne, the bride of Modigliani. When Modigliani died of tuberculosis in 1920, Barrey tried in vain to console the new widow, but Jeanne, eight months pregnant, committed suicide.

During the year 1925, the couple led a very open relationship, both having relations with people of both sexes. Fujita however did not forgive Fernande after she had a love affair with his cousin, Koyanagi, also a painter. Fujita locked himself with the Belgian artist Lucie Badoul (called Youki) for three days during which Fernande desperately sought her husband in the Parisian morgues. In 1928, the couple divorced and she lived with Koyanagi in Montmartre. When Koyanagi was separated in 1935, his relationship with Tsuguharu Fujita improved; and he helped her financially until her death.

Some sources link Fernande Barrey and photographer Jean Agélou's erotic model Miss Fernande based upon their birth year and name, although this has never been proven.

As a painter, she exhibited the paintings Josiane and Les Pêches at the Salon d'Automne in 1929.

== Bibliography ==
- Berk, Jiminez; Banham, Joanna (2001). Dictionary of Artists' Models. Taylor & Francis. ISBN 978-1-57958-233-3.
- Bourdon, Christian; Bourgeron, Jean-Pierre (2007). Jean Agélou : de l'académisme à la photographie de charme (in French). Éditions Marval. ISBN 978-2-86234-387-7.
- Édouard-Joseph, Rene (1930). Dictionnaire biographique des Artistes Contemporains. 1910–1930. Vol. 1 A–E. Art & Édition.
- Kluver, Billy; Martin, Julie (1994). Kiki's Paris: Artist and Lovers 1900–1930. Harry N. Abrams. ISBN 978-0-8109-2591-5.
- La Volpe, Louis (2005). Miss Fernande: First Lady of Erotica. Lulu Enterprises Incorporated. ISBN 978-1-4116-5324-5.
- Lemonier, Marc (2015). Guide historique du Paris libertin (in French). Groupe CB. ISBN 978-2-84271-670-7.
- Meyers, Jeffrey (2014). Modigliani: A Life. HMH. ISBN 978-0-5443-9121-5.
- Modigliani, Amedeo; Parisot, Christian (2005). Modigliani in Venice, Between Leghorn and Paris: Artwork, Documents from Archives Légales Amedeo Modigliani, Unpublished Documentation on the Modigliani Family Holdings in Sardinia. C. Delfino. ISBN 978-8-87138-369-9.
