= Jules Richard (photographer) =

French photographer, businessman and instrument maker

- Born: December 19, 1848
- Died: June 18, 1930 (aged 81)
- Known for: Verascope and Glyphoscope stereographic cameras
- Father: Félix Richard

Jules Richard (19 December 1848 - 18 June 1930) was a French photographer, businessman and instrument maker. Trained in part by his father, an instrument maker, Richard took over the family's business on his father's death. Richard was the inventor and manufacturer of the Verascope and Glyphoscope stereographic cameras, and also the Taxiphote stereographic viewer.

== Early career ==
Richard's father Félix Richard was an instrument maker in Paris; his uncle was the electrical instrument maker Paul-Gustave Froment. After training in his father's workshop, he worked outside the family company in the 1870s, manufacturing telegraphy equipment. Following his father's death in 1876, he returned to the family business in 1877, working in partnership with his younger brother Max starting in 1882. During the 1880s they built a reputation for manufacturing scientific barometers, and other environmental recording devices such as anemometers, pyrometers, aneroid barographs and dynamometers. Until 1891 when they split up, they were known as the Richard Frères; the 'RF' monogram persisted as the company's symbol. From 1893 the company produced stereoscopic cameras. After 1891 the company was named Jules Richard.

== Photography ==
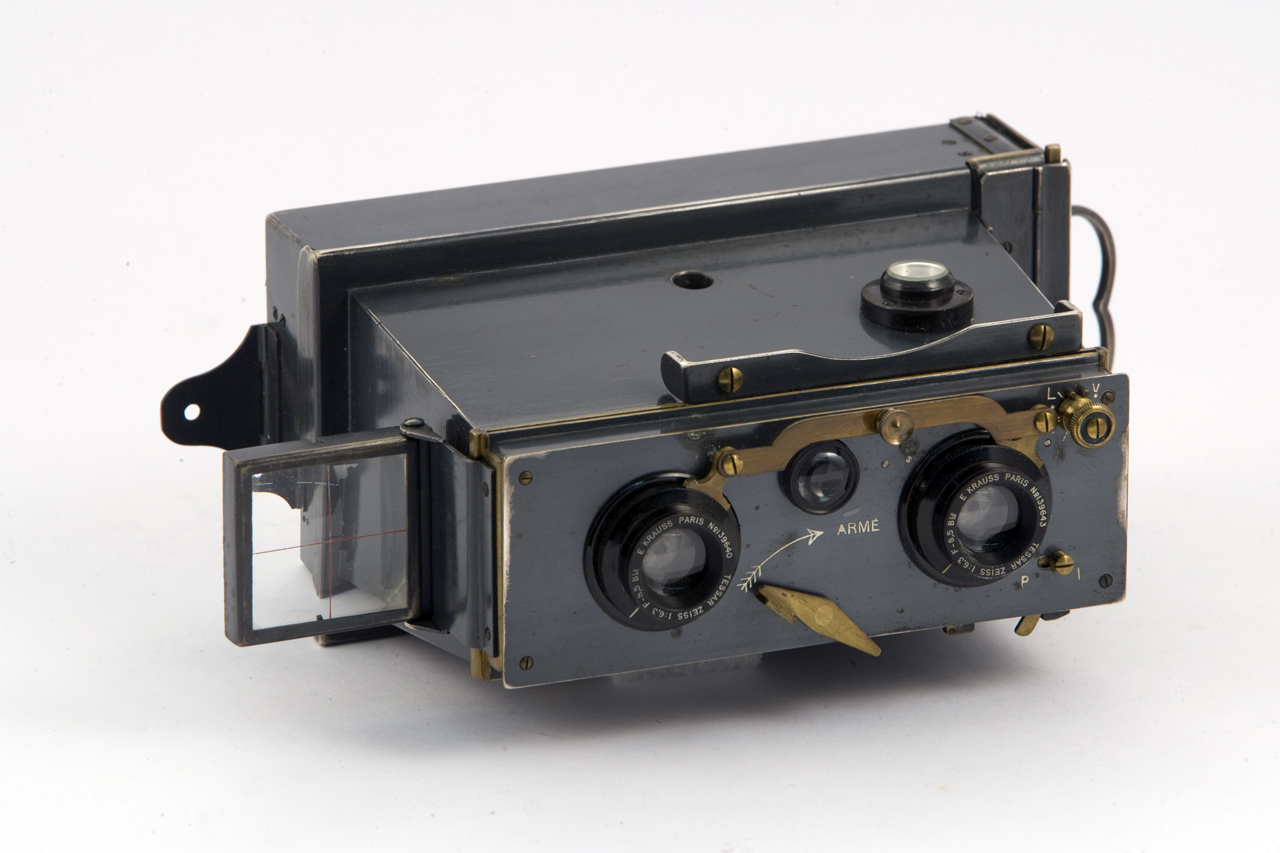
Vérascope stereoscopic camera for roll film, manufactured by Jules Richard, 1925.

In 1893 Richard introduced the Verascope, a stereographic camera. The Glyphoscope, a cheaper version of the Vérascope, followed, and between the two models Richard's company sold 120,000 cameras between 1894 and 1935. In 1899 Richard patented and introduced for sale the Taxiphote, a tabletop viewer for the glass stereo slides produced by the Vérascope.

An example of his Taxiphote camera is included in the collection of the Museum of Fine Arts Houston. The George Eastman Museum holds over 1,100 of his cameras, camera prototypes and stereographic photos. The History of Science Museum, Oxford holds examples of Verascope and the Taxiphote. The National Museum of American History, Washington, holds an aneroid barometer manufactured by the Richard Freres. Examples of the Verascope are held by the National Museum of Cinema, Italy.

== Gallery ==
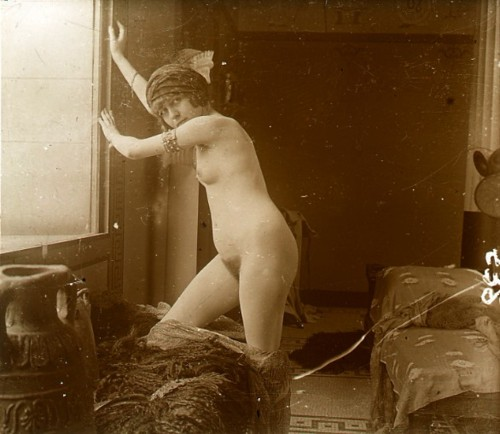
Nude Study, 1900s.

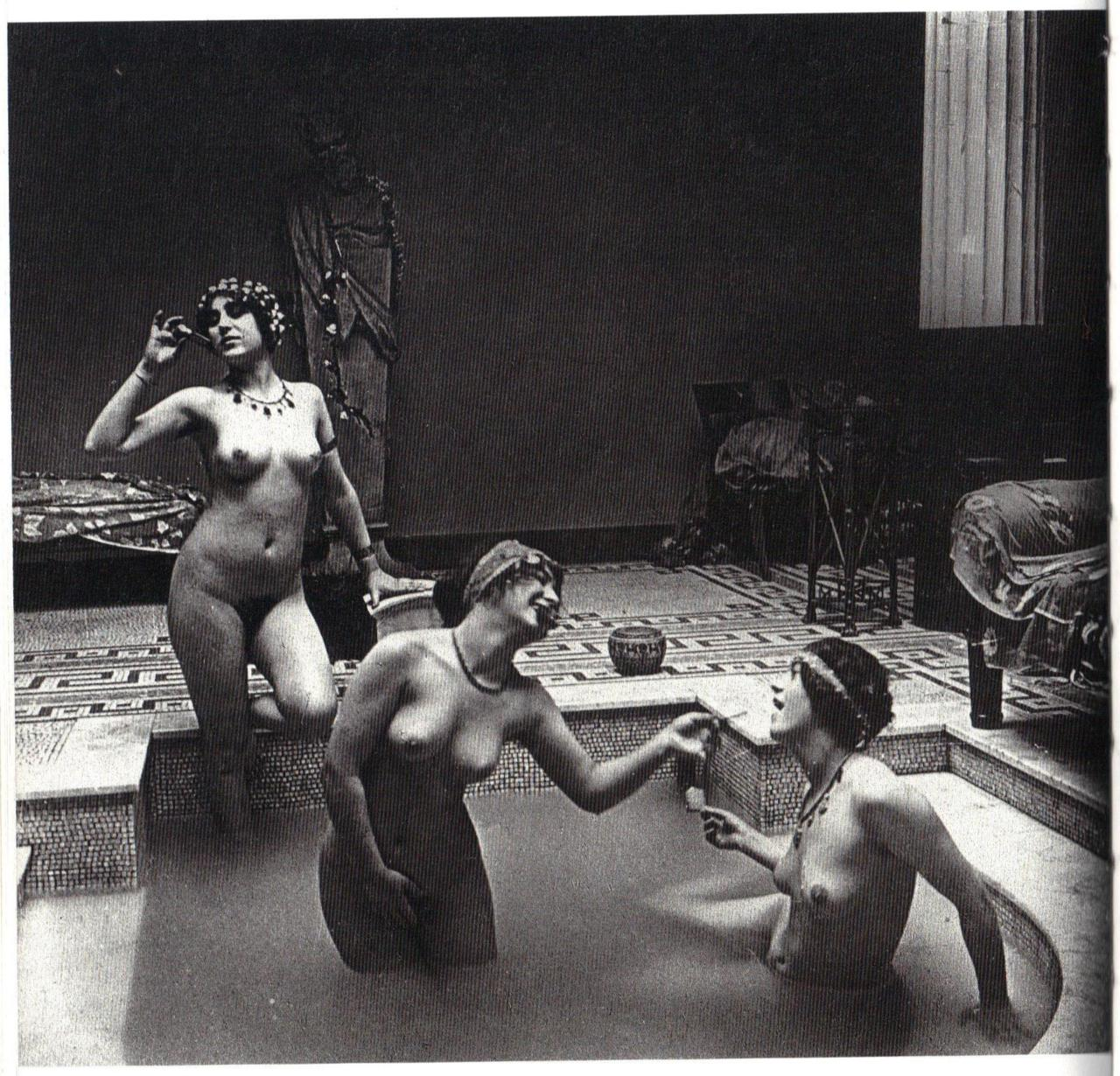
The Atrium; The Desbonnet Method, c.1912.

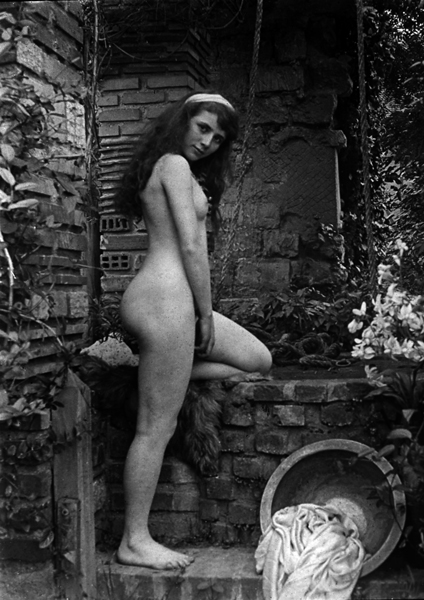
Female nude, c. 1900–1920.

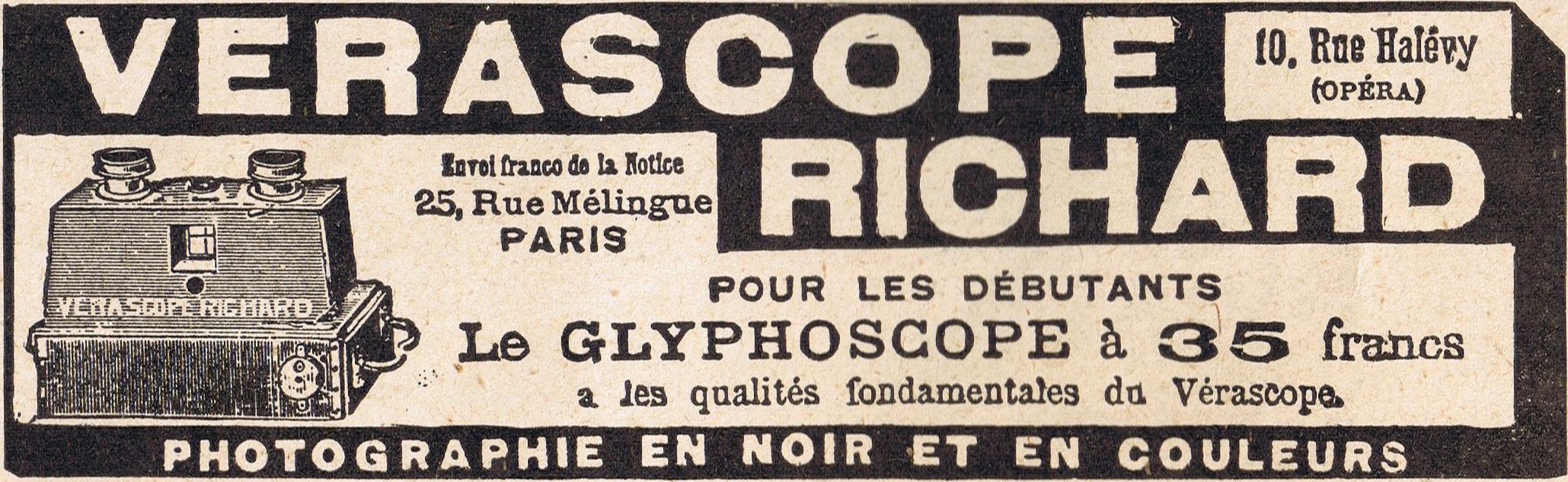
Glyphoscope advertisement, 8 July 1916

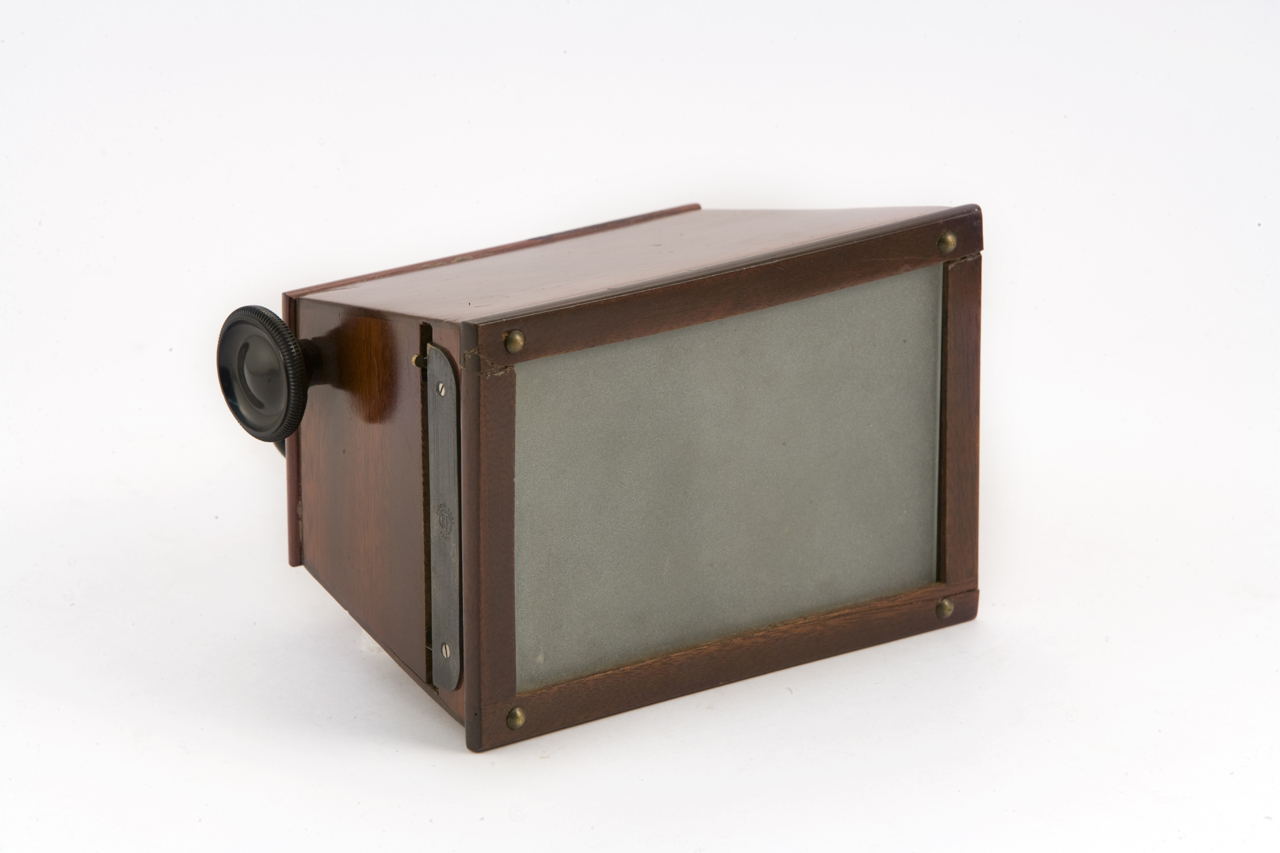
Portable stereoscope viewer, c. 1910–1930.

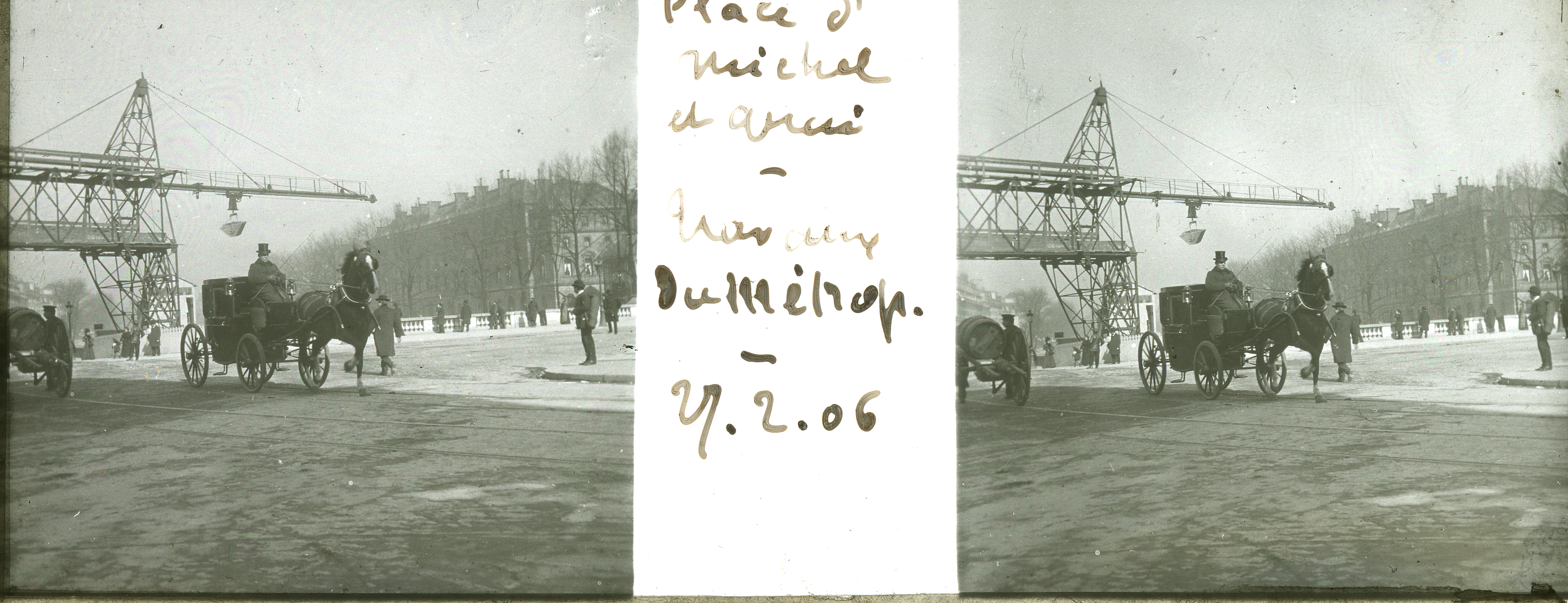
Gyphoscope stereographic image of the St Michel Quay and Bridge, Paris, 27 February 1906.

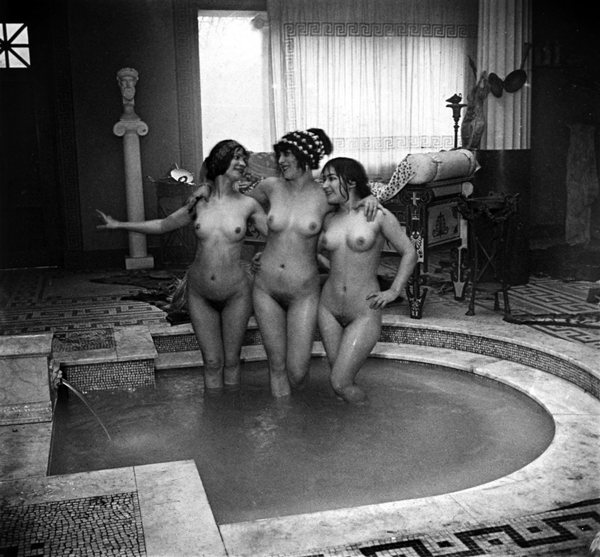
Nude women photographed by Jules Richard, c. 1900–1920.

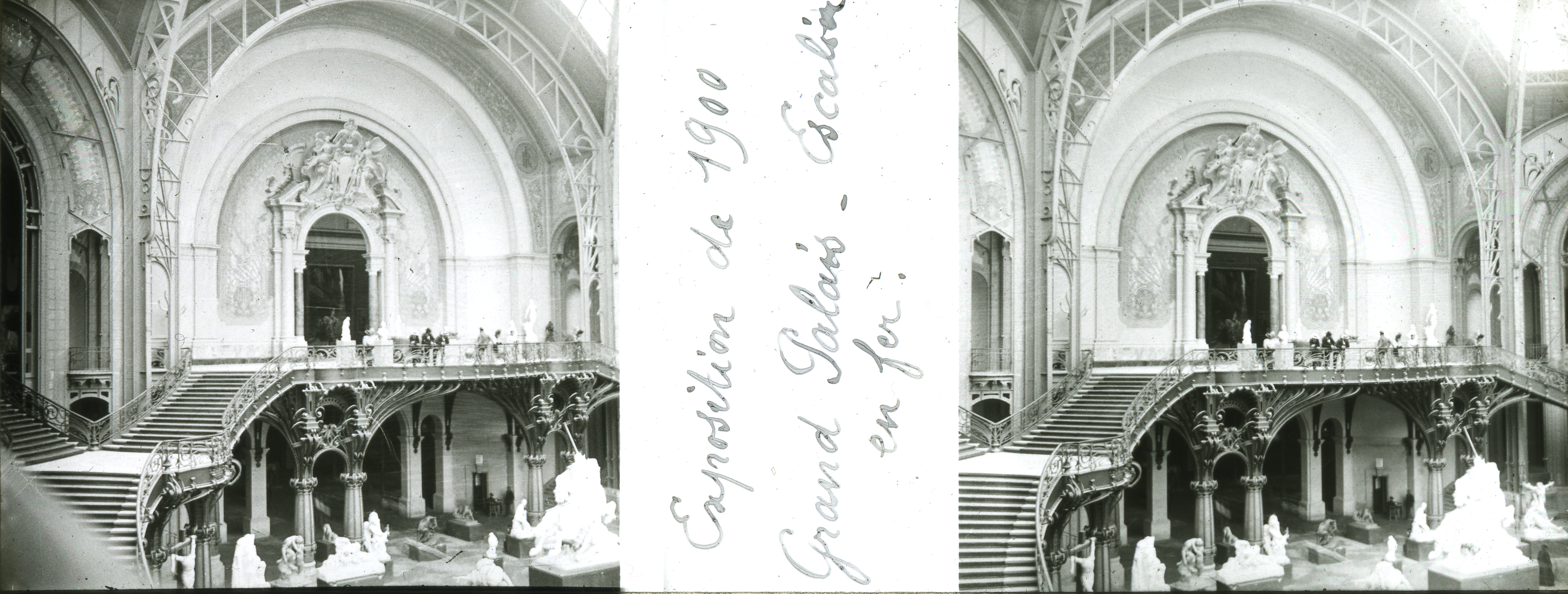
Stereographic image of the Grand Staircase in the Grand Palais, Paris, c. 1900.
