= List of animated feature films of 2014 =

This is a list of animated feature films that were released in 2014.

== List ==
Animated feature films of 2014
Title	Country	Director	Production company	Animation technique	Notes	Type	Release date	Duration
108 Demon Kings; 108 rois-démons	France; Belgium; Luxembourg; Ireland; China	Pascal Morelli	Gébéka Films, Scope Pictures, Bidibul Productions, Fundamental Films	Computer			December 4, 2014 (Forum des Images); January 21, 2015 (France)	104 minutes
A Fairly Odd Summer	Canada; United States	Savage Steve Holland	Billionfold.inc; Frederator Studios; Pacific Bay Entertainment	Computer / Live action			August 2, 2014	66 minutes
Achmed Saves America	United States	Frank Marino	Bento Box Entertainment; LEG	Traditional			March 18, 2014	60 minutes
The Adventures of Sinbad 2	China	Gu Peixin, Benpineko	Mr. Cartoon Pictures	Traditional			May 30, 2014	88 minutes
Adventures on the Red Plane; As Aventuras do Avião Vermelho	Brazil	José Maia, Frederico Pinto	OKNA Produções	Traditional			December 11, 2014	70 minutes
Aikatsu! The Movie アイカツ!	Japan	Yūichirō Yano	Sunrise, Bandai, Toei Company	Traditional			December 13, 2014	88 minutes
Anpanman: Apple Boy and Everyone's Hope それいけ!アンパンマン りんごぼうやと みんなの願い	Japan	Jun Kawagoe	Anpanman Production Committee; TMS Entertainment	Traditional			July 5, 2014	45 minutes
Alpha and Omega 3: The Great Wolf Games	United States	Richard Rich	Lionsgate; Crest Animation Productions	Computer		Direct-to-Video	March 25, 2014	45 minutes
Alpha and Omega 4: The Legend of the Saw Tooth Cave	United States	Richard Rich	Lionsgate; Crest Animation Productions	Computer		Direct-to-Video	October 7, 2014	45 minutes
Anahit	Armenia	David Sahakyants	Robert Sahakyants Production	Traditional			December 27, 2014 (Yerevan)	90 minutes
Ap Bokto	Bhutan	Karma Dhendup	Athang Animation Studio	Computer			September 2014	53 minutes
Asterix: The Land of the Gods; Astérix: Le domaine des Dieux	France	Alexandre Astier, Louis Clichy	SND, Mikros Image	Computer			November 26, 2014	85 minutes
Attack on Titan Part 1: Crimson Bow and Arrow	Japan	Tetsuro Araki	Wit Studio	Traditional			October 31, 2014 (Tokyo International Film Festival); November 22, 2014 (Japan)	119 minutes
Aunt Hilda! Tante Hilda !	France	Jacques-Rémy Girerd, Benoît Chieux	Folimage	Traditional			July 7, 2013 (La Rochelle); February 12, 2014 (France); April 26, 2014 (United States)	89 minutes
Back to L.A.	United States; Spain	Pablo Fernandez		Traditional			April 21, 2014	77 minutes
Balgar: The Movie; Българ Филмът	Bulgaria	Nedelcho Bogdanov		Traditional			November 28, 2014	73 minutes
Bamse and the City of Thieves; Bamse och Tjuvstaden	Sweden	Christian Ryltenius	Nordisk Film	Traditional			January 17, 2014	66 minutes
Banished; Desterrada	Colombia	Diego Guerra	68 Revoluciones	Traditional; Computer			March 17, 2014 (Cartagena International Film Festival)	79 minutes
Barbie and the Secret Door	United States	Karen J. Lloyd	Universal Studios; Arc Productions; Rainmaker Studios	Computer			August 7, 2014	81 minutes
Barbie: The Pearl Princess	United States	Ezekiel Norton	Universal Studios; Arc Productions; Rainmaker Studios	Computer			February 15, 2014	73 minutes
Batman: Assault on Arkham	United States	Jay Oliva; Ethan Spaulding	Warner Bros. Animation; DC Entertainment; MOI Animation (Animation services)	Traditional		Direct-to-Video	July 25, 2014 (San Diego Comic-Con); July 29, 2014 (Digital); August 12, 2014 (Physical)	76 minutes
Berry and Dolly - Playmates hu:Bogyó és Babóca 3. - Játszótársak	Hungary	Antonin Krizanics; Géza M. Tóth	Kedd Animation Studio	Traditional			August 28, 2014	65 minutes
Beyond Beyond; Resan till Fjäderkungens Rike	Denmark; Sweden	Esben Toft Jacobsen	Copenhagen Bombay; C More Entertainment; Film Väst; Noble Entertainment; TV2 Danmark; TV4 Sweden	Computer			February 10, 2014 (Berlin International Film Festival); March 21, 2014 (Sweden)	78 minutes
Big Hero 6	United States	Don Hall; Chris Williams	Walt Disney Animation Studios	Computer		Theatrical	October 23, 2014 (Tokyo International Film Festival); October 31, 2014 (Abu Dhabi Film Festival); November 7, 2014	102 minutes
Bodacious Space Pirates: Abyss of Hyperspace	Japan	Tatsuo Satō	Satelight	Traditional			February 22, 2014	93 minutes
The Book of Life	United States	Jorge R. Gutierrez	20th Century Fox Animation; Reel FX Animation Studios	Computer			October 12, 2014 (L.A. Live); October 17, 2014	95 minutes
Boonie Bears: To the Rescue 熊出没之夺宝熊兵	China	Liang Ding	Fantawild Animation Inc.	Computer			January 17, 2014	96 minutes
The Boxcar Children	United States	Daniel Chuba; Mark A.Z. Dippe; Kyungho Jo	Phase 4 Films, Hammerhead Productions	Computer			April 8, 2014 (TIFF Kids); August 25, 2014	86 minutes
The Boxtrolls	United States	Anthony Stacchi, Graham Annable	Laika	Stop motion			August 31, 2014 (Venice); September 12, 2014 (United Kingdom); September 26, 2014	97 minutes
The Boy and the World; O Menino e o Mundo	Brazil	Ale Abreu	Filme de Papel	Traditional			September 20, 2013 (OIAF); January 17, 2014 (Brazil)	80 minutes
Buddha 2: Tezuka Osamu no Buddha ~Owarinaki Tabi~; BUDDHA2 手塚治虫のブッダ 終りなき旅	Japan	Toshiaki Komura	Toei Animation, Tezuka Productions	Traditional			February 8, 2014	85 minutes
Chaar Sahibzaade	India	Harry Baweja	Baweja Movies; Irealities Technology	Computer			November 6, 2014	128 minutes
Cheburashka; Чебурашка	Japan; Russia	Makoto Nakamura	Ffangoentertoyment	Stop motion			February 2014	57 minutes
The Clockwork Girl	Canada	Kevin Hanna	Luximation, Arcana Studio, Legacy Filmworks	Computer		Television Film	January 12, 2014	85 minutes
Coconut, the Little Dragon; Der kleine Drache Kokosnuss	Germany	Hubert Weiland; Nina Wels	Caligari Film, ZDF, Universum Film	Computer			December 18, 2014	83 minutes
Pet Pals in Windland it:Cuccioli – Il paese del vento	Italy	Sergio Manfio	Gruppo Alcuni; LuxAnimation	Computer			March 17, 2014	80 minutes
Detective Conan: Dimensional Sniper	Japan	Kobun Shizuno	TMS Entertainment	Traditional			April 19, 2014	110 minutes
Doraemon: New Nobita's Great Demon—Peko and the Exploration Party of Five	Japan	Shinnosuke Yakuwa	Shin-Ei Animation	Traditional			March 8, 2014	109 minutes
Dragon Nest: Warrior's Dawn	China; United States	Song Yuefeng	Mili Pictures	Computer			July 31, 2014	88 minutes
Dwegons and Leprechauns	United States	Tom Walsh	EnterAktion Studios	Computer			November 14, 2014	97 minutes
Eiga Precure All Stars New Stage 3: Eien no Tomodachi	Japan		Toei Animation	Traditional			March 15, 2014	71 minutes
Evliya Çelebi: The Fountain of Youth	Turkey	Serkan Zelzele	Anibera, Epics Fx Studios	Computer			November 14, 2014	82 minutes
Expelled from Paradise	Japan	Seiji Mizushima	Toei Animation; Graphinica	Computer			November 15, 2014	104 minutes
Farm House 81 II	China	Kerr Xu	Shanghai Hippo Animation Co., Ltd; Hunan TV Aniworld Satellite TV tudou.com	Computer			October 1, 2014	80 minutes
Food War	China	Shu Zhan					September 5, 2014	89 minutes
The Frogville	Taiwan			Computer			October 3, 2014	85 minutes
Gekijōban Cardfight!! Vanguard	Japan	Takashi Motoki; Shin Itagaki	Ace Crew Entertainment; Ultra Super Pictures	Traditional	anime/live action		September 13, 2014	72 minutes
Gekijō-ban Tiger & Bunny -The Rising-	Japan	Yoshitomo Yonetani	Sunrise	Traditional			February 8, 2014	90 minutes
GG Bond 2	China	Gu Zhibin; Lu Jinming	WinSing	Computer			May 31, 2014	88 minutes
Ghost Messenger 고스트 메신저 (Goseuteu Mesinjeo)	South Korea	Goo Bong-hoe	STUDIO ANIMAL	Traditional			May 20, 2014	79 minutes
Giovanni's Island; Jobanni no shima	Japan	Mizuho Nishikubo	Production I.G	Traditional			February 22, 2014	102 minutes
The Golden Horse; Aukso zirgas	Lithuania	Reinis Kalnaellis	Copenhagen Bombay; Paul Thiltges Distributions; Rija Films	Traditional			August 29, 2014	75 minutes
HappinessCharge PreCure! the Movie: The Ballerina of the Land of Dolls	Japan	Chiaki Kon	Toei Animation	Traditional			October 11, 2014	71 minutes
Happy Heroes 2 Qiyuan Planet Wars	China						July 20, 2014	
Happy Little Submarines 4: Adventure of Octopus	China	James Hol		Computer			May 30, 2014	80 minutes
Heavenly Sword	United States	Gun Ho Jung	PlayStation Originals	Computer			September 2, 2014	85 minutes
Henry & Me	United States	Barrett Esposito	Henry & Me Productions	Traditional			August 18, 2014 (New York City); September 30, 2014 (DVD)	67 minutes
The Hero of Color City	United States	Frank Gladstone	Exodus Film Group; Toonz Animation India	Computer			October 3, 2014	77 minutes
How to Train Your Dragon 2	United States	Dean DeBlois	DreamWorks Animation	Computer		Theatrical	May 16, 2014 (Cannes); June 13, 2014; July 4, 2014 (United Kingdom)	102 minutes
I Am a Wolf	China						May 31, 2014	95 minutes
I Am Nightmare	United States	M. dot Strange		Computer			February 14, 2014	128 minutes
The Idolmaster Movie: Beyond the Brilliant Future!	Japan	Atsushi Nishigori	A-1 Pictures	Traditional			January 25, 2014	122 minutes
Ikkyû san	China; Japan			Traditional			January 31, 2014	81 minutes
Iron Man & Captain America: Heroes United	United States	Leo Riley	Marvel Animation	Computer		Direct-to-Video	July 29, 2014	71 minutes
JLA Adventures: Trapped in Time	United States	Giancarlo Volpe	Warner Bros. Animation; DC Entertainment; DR Movie (Animation services)	Traditional		Direct-to-Video	January 21, 2014	52 minutes
Justice League: War	United States	Jay Oliva	Warner Bros. Animation; DC Entertainment; MOI Animation (Animation services)	Traditional		Direct-to-Video	January 21, 2014 (Digital); February 4, 2014 (Physical)	79 minutes
The Jungle Book	India; United States	Jun Falkenstein; Kevin Johnson	DQ Entertainment	Computer			January 26, 2014	64 minutes
Jungle Shuffle	Mexico; South Korea; Colombia	Taedong Park; Mauricio De la Orta	Animation Picture Company; Avikoo Studios	Computer			October 2, 2014	82 minutes
K: Missing Kings	Japan	Shinto Suzuki	GoHands	Traditional			July 12, 2014	73 minutes
Kuiba 3	China	Wang Chuan, Zhang Gang, Zhou Jie		Traditional			October 1, 2014	90 minutes
La leyenda de las Momias	Mexico	Alberto Rodríguez	Ánima Estudios	Flash			October 30, 2014	83 minutes
The Legend of Qin 秦时明月3D电影龙腾万里	China	Robin Shen	Sparkly Key Animation Studio	Computer			August 8, 2014	90 minutes
The Lego Movie	United States; Australia; Denmark	Phil Lord and Chris Miller	The Lego Group; Lin Pictures; RatPac-Dune Entertainment; Vertigo Entertainment; Village Roadshow Pictures; Warner Animation Group	Computer / Live action		Theatrical	February 1, 2014 (Regency Village Theater); February 6, 2014 (Denmark); February 7, 2014; April 3, 2014 (Australia)	100 minutes
The Little Medic – Secret Mission of the Bodynauts; Der Kleine Medicus – Geheimnisvolle Mission im Körper	Germany	Peter Claridge	WunderWerk, Zeitsprung Pictures	Computer			October 30, 2014	78 minutes
Lupin the IIIrd: Daisuke Jigen's Gravestone	Japan	Takeshi Koike		Traditional			June 21, 2014	51 minutes
Maleficent	United States	Robert Stromberg	Walt Disney Pictures; Roth Films	Computer / Live action		Theatrical	May 30, 2014	97 minutes
Magic Wonderland	China	Wu Jianrong; Fang Lei		Computer			May 30, 2014	90 minutes
The Magical Brush	China	Frankie Chung		Computer			July 25, 2014	87 minutes
Manieggs: Revenge of the Hard Egg hu:Manieggs: Egy kemény tojás bosszúja	Hungary	Zoltán Miklósy	Umatik Entertainment	Computer			June 9, 2014 (AIAFF); September 14, 2014 (Cinefest International Film Festival); February 26, 2015 (Hungary)	90 minutes
Maya the Bee	Germany; Australia	Alexs Stadermann	Studio 100 Film; Buzz Studios	Computer			September 4, 2014 (South Korea); September 11, 2014 (Germany); November 1, 2014 (Australia)	87 minutes
Mc Dull·Me & My Mum	China	Brian Tse; Li Junmin	Sunwah Media	Traditional			October 1, 2014	81 minutes
Meet the Pegasus	China	Jian Yaozong		Traditional			January 16, 2014 (China); January 30, 2014 (Hong Kong)	83 minutes
Mighty Raju: Rio Calling	India	Rajiv Chilaka	Green Gold Animation	Flash			May 17, 2014	99 minutes
Mini and the Mozzies; Cykelmyggen og minibillen	Denmark	Jannik Hastrup; Flemming Quist Møller	Dansk Tegnefilm	Flash			June 12, 2014	74 minutes
Muppets Most Wanted	United States	James Bobin	The Muppets Studio	Puppetry / Live action		Theatrical	March 21, 2014	107 minutes
Moomins on the Riviera	France; Finland	Xavier Picard	Handle Productions; Pictak Cie	Traditional		Theatrical	October 10, 2014 (Finland); February 4, 2015 (France)	80 minutes
Mortadelo and Filemon: Mission Implausible; Mortadelo y Filemón contra Jimmy el Cachondo	Spain	Javier Fesser	Ilion Animation Studios; Zeta Cinema; Películas Pendelton; Televisión Española; Canal+ Televisió de Catalunya; ONO	Computer			November 28, 2014	88 minutes
Mr. Peabody & Sherman	United States	Rob Minkoff	DreamWorks Animation; Pacific Data Images; Bullwinkle Studios	Computer		Theatrical	February 7, 2014 (United Kingdom); March 7, 2014	92 minutes
Mummy, I'm a Zombie; Dixie y la rebelión zombi	Spain	Beñat Beitia, Ricardo Ramón	Abra Producciones	Computer			September 21, 2014 (San Sebastián International Film Festival)	82 minutes
Mune: Guardian of the Moon; Mune, le gardien de la Lune	France	Benoît Philippon, Alexandre Heboyan	Onyx Films	Traditional / Computer			December 6, 2014 (Forum des images); October 14, 2015 (France)	86 minutes
My Little Pony: Equestria Girls – Rainbow Rocks	United States; Canada	Jayson Thiessen	Hasbro Studios; DHX Media/Vancouver; Top Draw Animation	Flash			September 27, 2014	70 minutes
The Last: Naruto the Movie	Japan	Tsuneo Kobayashi	Studio Pierrot	Traditional			December 6, 2014	112 minutes
New Minesweepers Warfare: Courageous Boy	China						May 30, 2014	94 minutes
Night at the Museum: Secret of the Tomb	United States	Shawn Levy	21 Laps Entertainment; 1492 Pictures	Computer / Live action	Theatrical		December 19, 2014	98 minutes
The Nut Job	Canada; United States; South Korea	Peter Lepeniotis	ToonBox Entertainment, Red Rover International	Computer			January 11, 2014 (Los Angeles); January 17, 2014 (United States & Canada); January 29, 2014 (South Korea)	86 minutes
One Hundred Thousand Bad Jokes	China	Lu Hengyu, Li Shujie	Wanda Media; Shanghai Toonmax Media; Paramount Pictures; Nickelodeon Movies; Tencent Pictures; U-17; Spin Master Entertainment	Flash			December 31, 2014	100 minutes
Paddington	United Kingdom; France	Paul King	StudioCanal	Computer / Live action			28 November 2014	95 minutes
Penguins of Madagascar	United States	Simon J. Smith; Eric Darnell	DreamWorks Animation; Pacific Data Images	Computer		Theatrical	November 14, 2014 (China); November 26, 2014	91 minutes
Persona 3 The Movie: Chapter 2, Midsummer Knight's Dream	Japan		Anime International Company	Traditional			June 7, 2014	93 minutes
Planes: Fire & Rescue	United States	Bobs Gannaway	DisneyToon Studios	Computer		Theatrical	July 15, 2014 (El Capitan Theatre); July 18, 2014 (United States)	84 minutes
Pim and Pom: The Big Adventure; Pim & Pom: Het grote avontuur	Netherlands	Gioia Smid	A-Film Benelux, Flink Film	Stop motion			April 9, 2014	70 minutes
The Pirate Fairy	United States	Peggy Holmes	DisneyToon Studios	Computer			February 13, 2014 (Denmark); April 1, 2014 (United States)	78 minutes
Pokémon the Movie: Diancie and the Cocoon of Destruction ポケモン・ザ・ムービーXY 「破壊の繭とディアンシー」 Pokémon Za Mūbī Ekkusu Wai "Hakai no Mayu to Dianshī"	Japan	Kunihiko Yuyama	OLM, Inc., Shogakukan-Shueisha Productions	Traditional			July 19, 2014	77 minutes
Pororo, The Racing Adventure 뽀로로 극장판 슈퍼썰매 대모험	China; South Korea	Young Kyun Park	CJ Entertainment; Leading Investment Co. Ltd. China ACG Group Co. Ltd. China Entertainment Corporation Co. Ltd. Ocon Studios	Computer			January 23, 2013 (South Korea); January 25, 2013 (China); October 6, 2014 (United States)	79 minutes
Possessed; Pos Eso	Spain	Samuel Ortí Martí	Basque Films; Conflictivos Productions	Stop motion			October 4, 2014 (Sitges Film Festival); November 27, 2014 (Gijón International Film Festival); April 30, 2015 (Spain)	81 minutes 75 minutes (Spain)
Postman Pat: The Movie	United Kingdom; United States	Mike Disa	Classic Media; RGH Pictures; Timeless Films	Computer		Theatrical	May 23, 2014	88 minutes
The Predictor Paul	China	Shi Yang	Flash animation				July 4, 2014	87 minutes
Pretty Rhythm	Japan	Masakazu Hishida	Tatsunoko Production	Traditional			March 8, 2014	48 minutes
The Princess and the Magic Mirror Meñique y el espejo mágico	Cuba	Ernesto Padrón	Ficción Producciones	Computer	Theatrical		July 20, 2014	78 minutes
The Prophet	Canada; France; Lebanon; Qatar; United States	Roger Allers	Ventanarosa, FFA Private Bank, Doha Film Institute	Traditional			September 6, 2014 (TIFF); August 7, 2015 (United States)	85 minutes
Ribbit	Malaysia	Chuck Powers	KRU Studios, Crest Animation Studios	Computer			June 21, 2014 (Niagara Integrated Film Festival); September 4, 2014 (Malaysia)	88 minutes
Rio 2	United States	Carlos Saldanha	Blue Sky Studios	Computer	Sequel to Rio (2011).	Theatrical	March 20, 2014 (International); April 11, 2014 (United States)	101 minutes
Rocks in My Pockets	Latvia; United States	Signe Baumane	Locomotive Productions, Rocks In My Pockets LLC	Traditional			July 7, 2014 (Karlovy Vary); August 22, 2014 (Latvia)	88 minutes
Roco Kingdom 3	China	Gong Bingsi		Traditional			July 10, 2014	85 minutes
Saint Seiya: Legend of Sanctuary	Japan	Keiichi Sato		Computer			June 11, 2014 (Annecy); June 21, 2014 (Japan)	93 minutes
Satellite Girl and Milk Cow 우리별 일호와 얼룩소 (Uribyeol Ilho-wa Eollukso)	South Korea	Hyeong-yoon Jang		Traditional			February 20, 2014	81 minutes
Scooby-Doo! Frankencreepy	United States	Paul McEvoy	Warner Bros. Animation	Traditional		Direct-to-Video	July 27, 2014 (San Diego Comic-Con); August 5, 2014 (Digital HD)	74 minutes
Scooby-Doo! WrestleMania Mystery	United States	Brandon Vietti	Warner Bros. Animation; WWE Studios	Traditional		Direct-to-Video	March 24, 2014 (United Kingdom); March 25, 2014 (United States)	84 minutes
Secret Plans 新大头儿子和小头爸爸之秘密计划	China	He Cheng	Zhong Yang Television Station, Yang Shi Dong Hua	Computer			September 26, 2014	87 minutes
Seer 4	China	Wang Zhangjun; Yin Yuqi		Computer			July 10, 2014	86 minutes
Sekai-ichi Hatsukoi: Yokozawa Takafumi no Baai	Japan	Chiaki Kon	Studio Deen	Traditional			March 15, 2014	50 minutes
The Seventh Dwarf; Der 7bte Zwerg	Germany	Boris Aljinovic; Harald Siepermann	Zipfelmützen GmbH & Co. KG, Erfttal Film, Animationsfabrik	Computer			September 25, 2014	87 minutes
Shi Er Sheng Xiao Cheng Shi Ying Xiong	China	Ge Haitao	Anhui Film Group; Anhui Tongren Media Co., Ltd	Flash			October 3, 2014	80 minutes
Shin Gekijō-ban Initial D	Japan		Sanzigen; LIDEN FILMS	Traditional			August 23, 2014	62 minutes
Slugterra: Return of the Elementals	Canada	Johnny Darrell, Logan McPherson, Behzad Mansoori-Dara, Daniel DeSerranno, Steve Sacks	Nerd Corps Entertainment	Computer			August 21, 2014	63 minutes
The Snow Queen: Journey Continues; Снежная королева 2: Перезаморозка	Russia	Alexey Tsitsilin	Wizart Animation	Computer			December 12, 2014 (United Kingdom); January 1, 2015 (Russia)	76 minutes
Snow White: The Power of Dwarfs 白雪公主之矮人力量	China	Adam Qiu	Guangzhou Jinchuan Media	Computer			August 21, 2014	84 minutes
Son of Batman	United States	Ethan Spaulding	Warner Bros. Animation; DC Entertainment; The Answer Studio (Animation services)	Traditional		Direct-to-Video	April 22, 2014	74 minutes
Song of the Sea	Ireland	Tomm Moore	Cartoon Saloon	Traditional		Theatrical	September 6, 2014 (TIFF); December 10, 2014 (France/Belgium/Luxembourg); February 19, 2015 (Denmark); July 10, 2015 (Ireland)	94 minutes
Sora no Otoshimono Final: Eternal My Master	Japan	Hisashi Saitō	Production IMS	Traditional			April 26, 2014	50 minutes
Soreike! Anpanman: Ringo Bō Ya To Min'Nano Negai	Japan	Jun Kawagoe		Traditional			July 5, 2014	45 minutes
Space Battleship Yamato 2199: A Voyage to Remember	Japan	Yutaka Izubuchi	Xebec	Traditional			October 11, 2014	120 minutes
Space Dogs 2 Белка и Стрелка: Лунные приключения	Russia	Inna Evlannikova, Aleksander Khramtsov	KinoAtis	Computer			February 6, 2014	90 minutes
Space Panda 2	China						May 31, 2014	
Stand by Me Doraemon; STAND BY ME ドラえもん	Japan	Takashi Yamazaki, Ryūichi Yagi	Fujiko Movie Studio	Computer			August 8, 2014	95 minutes
The Stressful Adventures of Boxhead and Roundhead	Romania; United States	Elliot Cowan	Ace & Son Moving Picture Co., Artis Film, Scenery Hill Entertainment	Flash / Traditional			October 3, 2014 (Romania); December 5, 2015 (South Texas Underground Film Festival)	72 minutes
Super Three	China	Fu Yan					April 4, 2014	80 minutes
The Swan Princess: A Royal Family Tale	United States	Richard Rich	Nest Family Entertainment; StreetLight Animation Productions	Computer			February 25, 2014	79 minutes
Tale of the Rally	China	Zheng Chongxin		Traditional			September 6, 2014	82 minutes
Tamako Love Story たまこラブストーリー	Japan	Naoko Yamada	Kyoto Animation	Traditional			April 26, 2014	83 minutes
Teenage Mutant Ninja Turtles	United States	Jonathan Liebesman	Nickelodeon Movies; Platinum Dunes; Gama Entertainment; Mednick; Paramount Pictures	Computer / Live action			August 8, 2014	101 minutes
Timing	South Korea	Min Kyung-Jo	Hyoin Entertainment	Traditional			October 3, 2014 (Busan); May 24, 2015 (Seoul); December 10, 2015 (South Korea)	100 minutes
Tinker Bell and the Legend of the NeverBeast	United States	Steve Loter	DisneyToon Studios	Computer		Direct-to-Video	December 12, 2014 (United Kingdom); March 3, 2015 (United States)	76 minutes
Tom and Jerry: The Lost Dragon	United States	Spike Brandt; Tony Cervone	Turner Entertainment Co. Warner Bros. Animation	Traditional		Direct-to-Video	July 27, 2014 (San Diego Comic-Con); August 19, 2014 (Digital); September 2, 2014 (DVD)	57 minutes
Transformers: Age of Extinction	United States	Michael Bay	Hasbro Studios; Di Bonaventura Pictures; Paramount Pictures	Computer / Live action			June 27, 2014	165 minutes
Triple Trouble; Trippel Trappel dierenstinerklaas	Netherlands	Albert 't Hooft; Paco Vink	il Luster Productions; Vivi Film; KRO	Traditional			October 8, 2014	65 minutes
Uchū Senkan Yamato 2199: Hoshi-Meguru Hakobune	Japan	Yutaka Izubuchi	Xebec	Traditional			October 11, 2014	120 minutes
VeggieTales: Beauty and the Beet	United States	Tom Owens	Big Idea Productions	Computer		Direct-to-Video	October 14, 2014	57 minutes
VeggieTales: Celery Night Fever	United States	Mike Nawrocki	Big Idea Productions	Computer		Direct-to-Video	August 5, 2014	52 minutes
VeggieTales: Veggies in Space: The Fennel Frontier	United States	Mike Nawrocki	Big Idea Productions	Computer		Direct-to-Video	March 11, 2014	48 minutes
The Wanted 18	Palestine; Canada; France	Amer Shomali; Paul Cowan	National Film Board of Canada	Stop motion			September 12, 2014 (Toronto International Film Festival)	75 minutes
When Marnie Was There; Omoide no Marnie	Japan	Hiromasa Yonebayashi	Studio Ghibli	Traditional		Theatrical	July 19, 2014	103 minutes
Winx Club: The Mystery of the Abyss; Winx Club – Il mistero degli abissi	Italy	Iginio Straffi	Rainbow SpA (ViacomCBS)	Computer			September 4, 2014	82 minutes
Yellowbird; Gus, petit oiseau, grand voyage	France	Christian De Vita	TeamTO	Computer			October 11, 2014 (London Film Festival); February 4, 2015	88 minutes
Yowamushi Pedal Re:RIDE	Japan	Osamu Nabeshima	TMS/8PAN	Traditional			September 19, 2014	90 minutes
Yugo & Lala 2 神秘世界历险记2	China	Wang Yunfei		Computer			August 8, 2014	80 minutes
Yume wa Hatou wo Koete – Tenmei ni Ikita Otoko: Suminokura Ryōi	Japan	Traditional	Mushi Productions	Traditional				

== Highest-grossing animated films ==
The following is a list of the 10 highest-grossing animated feature films first released in 2014.

Rank	Title	Distributor/Studio	Worldwide gross	Ref.
1	Big Hero 6	Walt Disney Pictures / Walt Disney Animation Studios	$657,818,612	
2	How to Train Your Dragon 2	20th Century Fox / DreamWorks Animation	$621,537,519	
3	Rio 2	20th Century Fox / Blue Sky Studios	$498,781,117	
4	The Lego Movie	Warner Bros. / Animal Logic	$469,160,692	
5	Penguins of Madagascar	20th Century Fox / DreamWorks Animation	$373,015,621	
6	Mr. Peabody & Sherman	20th Century Fox / DreamWorks Animation	$275,698,039	
7	Stand by Me Doraemon	Toho / Shirogumi / Robot / Shin-Ei Animation	$183,664,442	
8	Planes: Fire & Rescue	Walt Disney Pictures / DisneyToon Studios	$151,386,640	
9	The Nut Job	Open Road Films / ToonBox Entertainment	$120,885,527	
10	The Boxtrolls	Focus Features / Laika	$109,285,033	

Stand by Me Doraemon became the highest-grossing Japanese animated film of 2014. Big Hero 6 has grossed over $650 million, making it the 27th highest grossing animated film of all time. It is the first year since 1997's Hercules finished 11th that an animated film is not in the top 10.

== See also ==
- List of animated television series of 2014
