= A Tale of Two Mozzies =

2007 animated film

- Theatrical release poster
- Danish: Cykelmyggen og dansemyggen
- Directed by: Jannik Hastrup; Flemming Quist Møller
- Screenplay by: Flemming Quist Møller
- Produced by: Marie Bro
- Music by: Jesper Mechlenburg
- Production company: Dansk Tegnefilm
- Distributed by: Nordisk Film Distribution
- Release date: 8 June 2007
- Running time: 79 minutes
- Country: Denmark
- Language: Danish

A Tale of Two Mozzies (Danish: Cykelmyggen og dansemyggen) is a 2007 Danish animated children's film directed by Jannik Hastrup and Flemming Quist Møller, from a screenplay by Møller. Produced by Marie Bro of Dansk Tegnefilm, A Tale of Two Mozzies was based on the eponymous series of children's books by Møller. Hastrup and Møller previously directed the 1971 film Benny's Bathtub. A Tale of Two Mozzies was released in Danish cinemas on 8 June 2007 by Nordisk Film Distribution. It was followed by a second film based on Møller's books in 2014, entitled Mini and the Mozzies.

== Premise ==
Dagmar, a dancing mosquito, is in love with mosquito Egon, however Egon is too busy achieving the ultimate sprint on his bicycle and wants to see the world. But when the evil red ant Queen Dominella and her soldiers kill the black ant Queen and take over the heap, Dagmar, Egon and their friends must put their differences aside and use their talents to save the colony.

== Voice cast ==
The voice cast for the film, as per the Danish Film Institute:

- Fabian August Harlang as Egon
- Selma Quist Møller as Dagmar
- Bjarke Kastberg Andersen as the Mini-Boy
- Peter Frödin as Didrik von Drone
- Ellen Hillingsø as Queen Flora
- Lisbet Dahl as Queen Dominella
- Claus Ryskjær as Working Ant Brian
- Ole Thestrup as the Soldier Ant Knud
- Esben Pretzmann as the Soldier Ant Harald
- Kaya Brüel as Queen Lilleskat
- Ditte Gråbøl as Myra and Kate
- Laila Miermont as Maren the milkmaid
- Marie Helger as Sensitiva de Luxe Anne
- Kim Larsen as Børge Bøf
- Christian Sievert as the Caterpillar
- Jesper Klein as the snot beetle
