= Black Diamond (library) =

- The Black Diamond
- Interactive map of the Black Diamond area

General information
- Type: National library
- Architectural style: Neomodern
- Location: Slotsholmen
- Coordinates: 55°40′24″N 12°34′58″E
- Construction started: 1995
- Completed: 1999

Technical details
- Structural system: Reinforced concrete
- Floor count: 7
- Floor area: 20,733 square metres (223,170 sq ft)

Design and construction
- Architect: Schmidt Hammer Lassen

The Black Diamond (Danish: Den Sorte Diamant) is a modern waterfront extension to the Royal Danish Library's old building on Slotsholmen in central Copenhagen, Denmark. Its quasi-official nickname is a reference to its polished black granite cladding and irregular angles. Designed by Danish architects Schmidt Hammer Lassen, the Black Diamond was completed in 1999 as the first in a series of large-scale cultural buildings along Copenhagen's waterfront.

Apart from its function as a library, the building houses a number of other public facilities and activities, most of which are located around the central, toplit atrium which cuts into the building with a huge glazed front facing the harbour. The facilities include a 600-seat auditorium, the Queen's Hall, used for concerts—mainly chamber music and jazz—literary events, theatrical performances and conferences. There are also exhibition spaces, a gift shop, a café and a garden. The exhibitions are based on or inspired by the library collections and range from historical topics through contemporary photography to artist collaborations such as Marina Abramović and Nick Cave.

== History ==
In the early 1990s, the Danish Ministry of Cultural Affairs launched an international architecture competition for the design of an extension to the Royal Library on Slotsholmen. The competition attracted 178 Danish and international architectural firms and ultimately Schmidt Hammer Lassen was chosen as the winner in 1993.

Construction started in 1995. The cost of the building was DKK 465,000,000. The Ministry of Cultural Affairs was the builders and Moe and Brødsgaard A/S the consulting engineers.

The Black Diamond was inaugurated on 7 September 1999 and opened to the public on 15 September 1999. The Minister of Cultural Affairs at the time, Jytte Hilden, named it the Black Diamond.

== Architecture ==
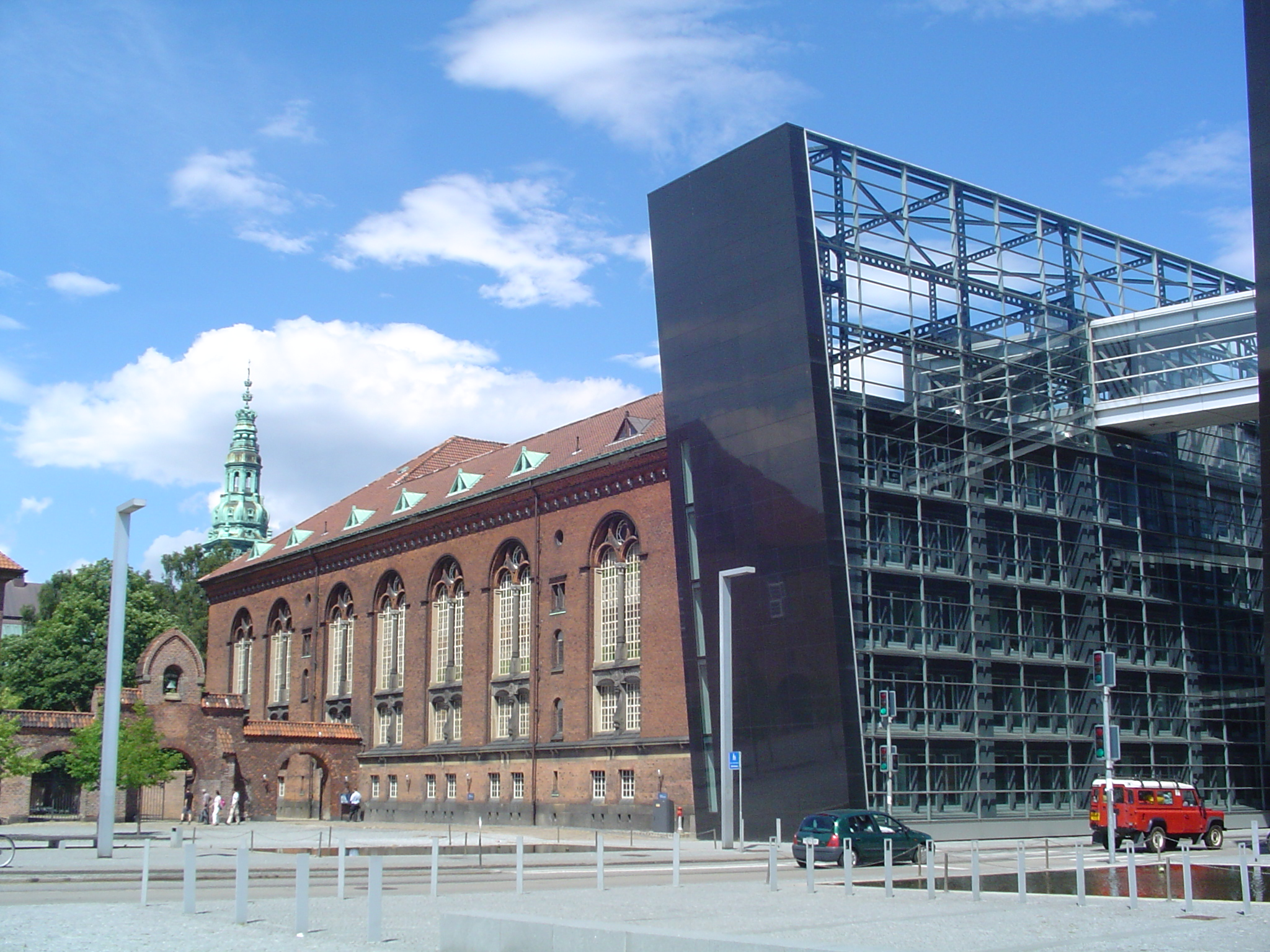
Connection to the old building

The basic shape of the Black Diamond is a box which leans to the left as seen from the harbour as well as towards the water. At the same time it expands slightly from the bottom and up and from north to south, giving it a distorted, prismatic shape.

The building is clad in black granite of a type known as Absolute Black, which was mined in Zimbabwe and then cut and polished in Italy. The black cladding amounts to 2,500 square metres and each stone weighs 75 kg.

A broad, glazed "crevasse" cleaves the facade into two, letting natural light into the central atrium inside the building. A glazed band also runs along the building's ground floor in its full height to allow for panoramic views of the waterfront from the inside while, at the same time, aiming to give the Diamond a floating appearance when seen from the water.

The Black Diamond is separated from the old building, known as the Holm Building, by the busy thoroughfare Christians Brygge which runs along the waterfront. Several skyways connect the two buildings.

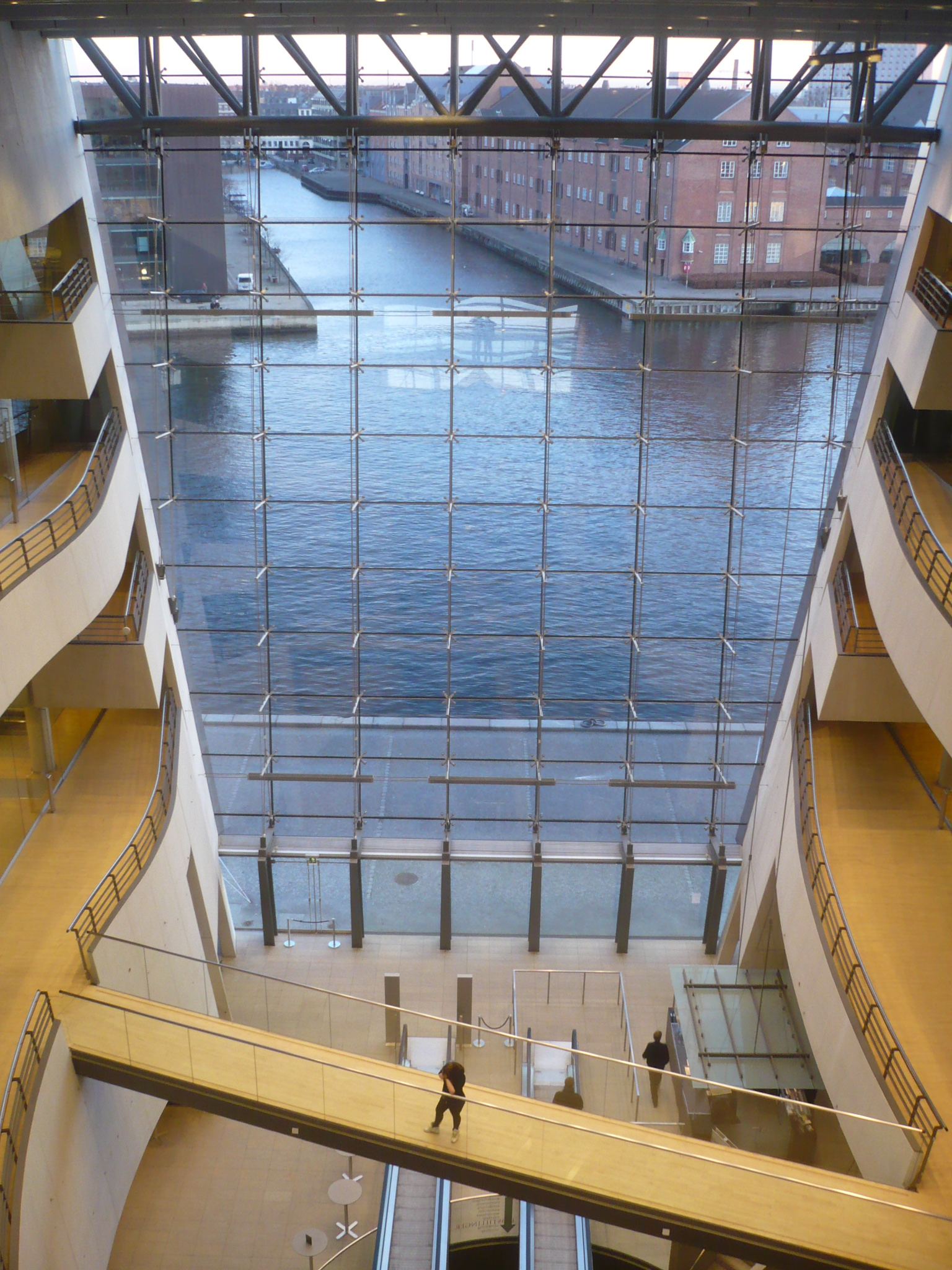
View over the harbour from the atrium

=== Atrium ===
In contrast to the stringent and dark exterior the atrium creates a bright and organic central space in the library. It is toplit and bounded by wavy balconies. From the atrium a travelator leads up to the C level which holds the main library facilities.

=== The Link ===
The Link is a connecting walkway running from the foyer of the old main building of the library through a skywalk above Christians Brygge and the atrium along a gangway to the glazed facade with sweeping views of Christianshavn and Islands Brygge across the harbour.

== Library facilities ==
The main floor of the library is the C level which is reached from the ground floor along a travelator. With the construction of the Black Diamond, the Royal Library on Slotsholmen has gained 21,500 square meters and now has six reading rooms compared to previously one and 474 reading and study seats compared to 96 prior to the extension. The Information Room holds 60 seats compared to the previous 46.

=== Kirkeby-broen ===
The circulation desk is located in the 18-metre-wide main skyway which connects the old and the new building above Christians Brygge.

The Royal Library on Slotsholmen is not a public library where it is possible to locate and pick the books from open shelves and then borrow them for use outside the library. On the contrary, the books have to be ordered either through online or by filling out a requisition form in the catalogue room. The books can then be collected the next day.

=== Reading rooms ===
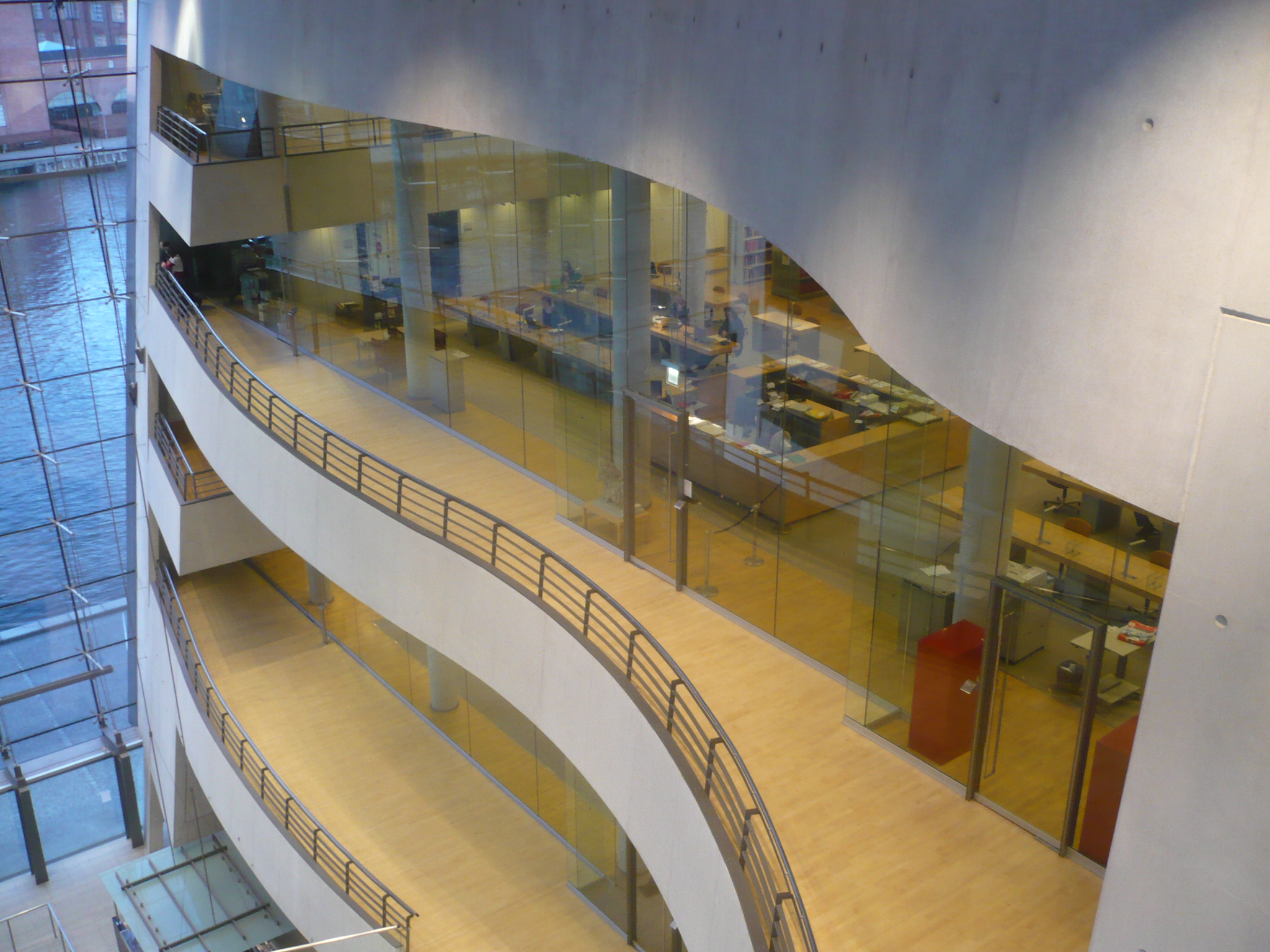
Looking into Reading Room West

The reading rooms on level C to F all face the atrium which provides them with natural light. The reading rooms each consist of double-height rooms with a projecting mezzanine floor.

The Reading Room West (Danish: Læsesal Vest) is also known as the Research Reading Room. It is intended to make it possible for users to study materials from the library’s collection which are restricted to the premises, and to make a large reference collection available for them. There are 160 study seats in the reading room and it is possible to obtain a permanent seat for a specific amount of time on application. The reference collection comprises a total of 65,000 volumes distributed over two floors. The emphasis of the collection is on the humanities and theology but all the library's subject fields are covered. The room has a specially secured area where protected material may be studied. The history of the reading room has its roots in the foundation of The Royal Library by King Frederik III and it has been relocated several times since then.

The Reading Room East has 130 study seats and its primary purpose is to give access to a large number of newspapers and periodicals and, at the same time, to provide a large number of study seats for other purposes. The preceding three years of publications of 4,000—3200 foreign and 800 Danish—periodicals are kept alphabetically along the shelves. There are 70,000 microfilm spools of both Danish and foreign newspapers. It is not possible to study restricted materials in this reading room. The target group is students and others, who require knowledge on a high level.

The two remaining reading rooms located in the Black Diamond are those of the Centre for Maps, Prints and Photographs and the Centre for Music and Theatre.

== Queen's Hall ==
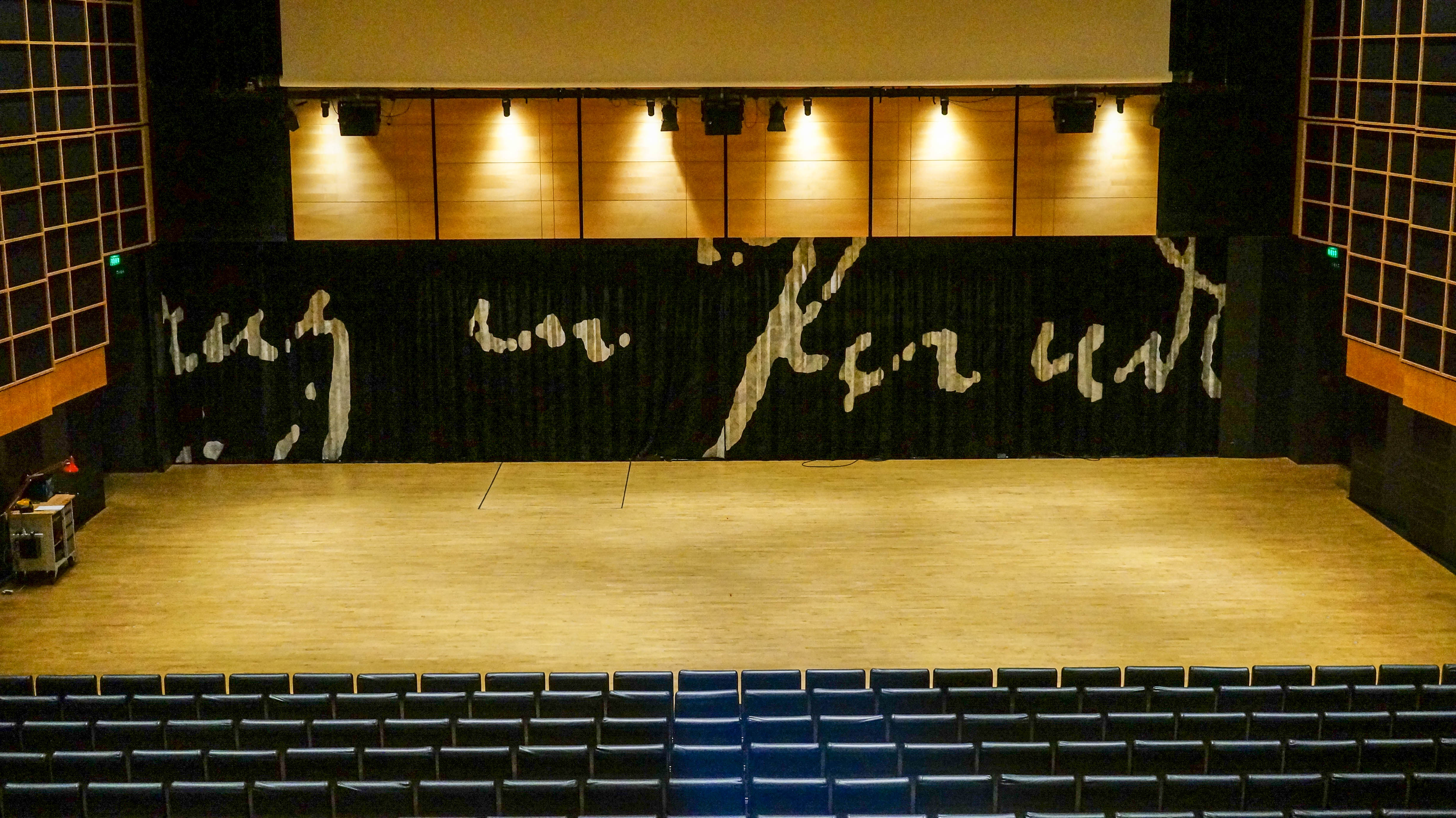
The Dronningesalen auditorium

The Queen's Hall is an auditorium seating up to 600 people. It is used for a variety of purposes, including concerts, conferences, film, ballet and theatre. The hall is equipped with a variable acoustic system which adapts to the specific type of music. Thereby the sound is adjustable to greater sonorousness, with longer reverberation for classical music and shorter reverberation for rhythmic music.

=== Concerts ===
The Queen Hall is primarily intended as a venue for classical, particularly chamber music, but also jazz and other forms of rhythmical music is played there.

The Library has its own resident chamber music ensemble known as the Diamond Ensemble which is frequently joined by international guest musicians. The repertoire includes "exhibition concerts" of musical works from the Royal Library's music archives which are the largest in the Nordic Countries.

Other concerts have been with Trio con Brio and Niels Lan Doky.

=== International Authors' Stage ===
The Queen's Hall is also used for a programme of lectures by leading International writers and intellectuals, the program is curated and hosted by Lise Bach Hansen. Upcoming or previous speakers include Uwe Tellkamp, Martin Walser, Günter Wallraff, Ingo Schulze, Jonathan Safran Foer, Lars Saabye Christensen, Ben Okri, Juli Zeh, Günter Grass, Salman Rushdie, Siegfried Lenz, Hans Magnus Enzensberger, Per Olov Enquist, Kristín Marja Baldursdóttir, Einar Már Guðmundsson, Julia Franck, Slavoj Žižek, Åsne Seierstad, Kofi Annan, Caitlin Moran, Siri Hustvedt, Paul Auster, and Alaa Al Aswany.

== Exhibitions ==
The Black Diamond has two main exhibition areas. The larger of the two is the Peristyle (Danish: Søjlehallen) which covers 600 square metres and is located at level K. It hosts a variety of cultural and historical exhibitions, including those held by the National Museum of Photography. The other, the Montana Hall, was created in 2009 and serves as the treasury of the library. It is here that the rarest pieces from the national heritage are exhibited.

One of the most ambitious exhibitions at the library was "Stranger Than Kindness" created in cooperation between Nick Cave and local curator Christina Back.

== Artwork ==
=== Kirk fresco ===
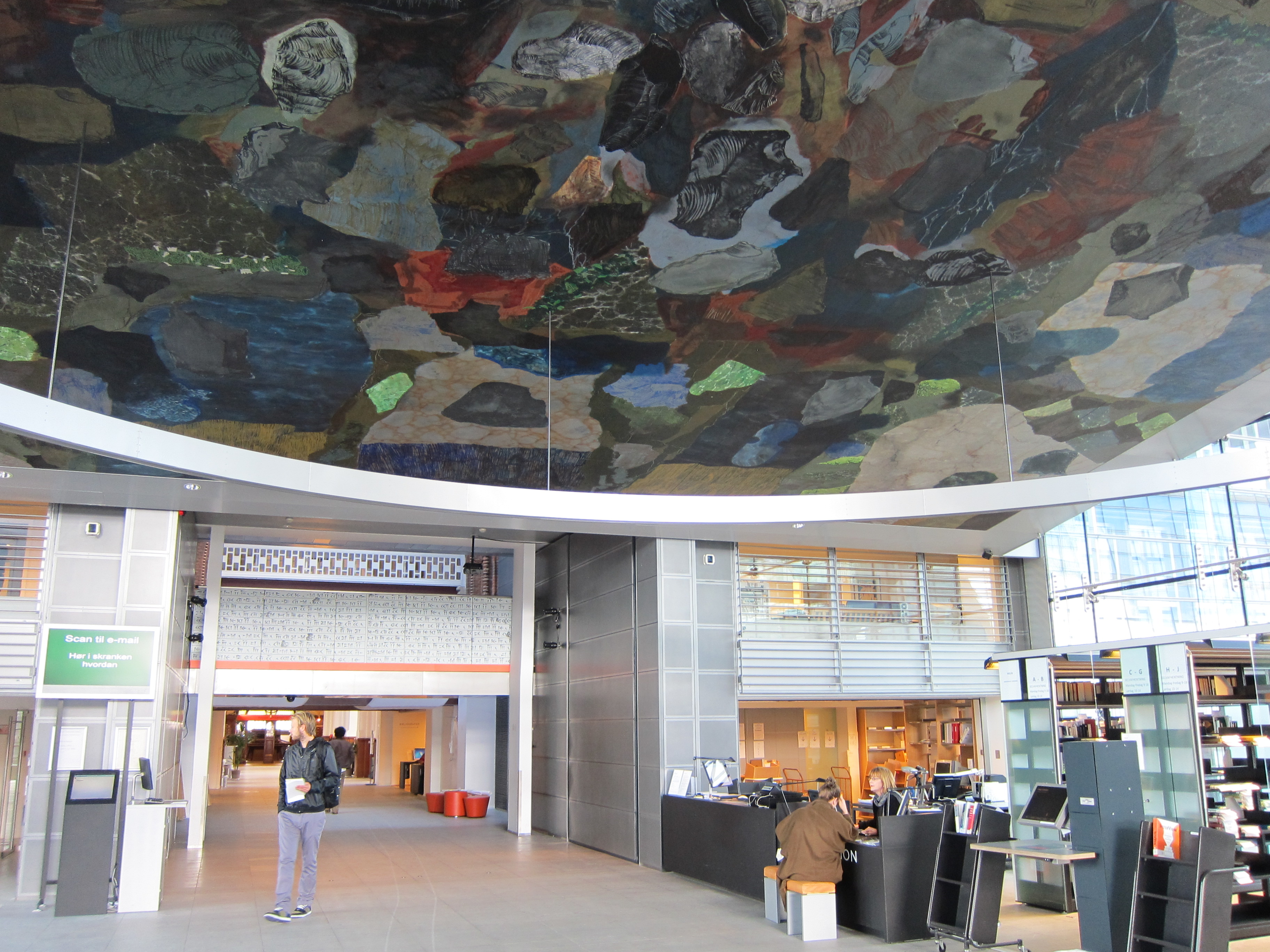
Per Kirkeby's nameless fresco

The Danish artist Per Kirkeby has created a 210 square metre titleless fresco at the entrance to the lending section and reading rooms at level C. The painting is one of the largest ceiling decorations in the Nordic countries and it took Per Kirkeby more than a year to complete. Executed in oils, the colourful and organic painting creates a striking contrast to the minimalist surroundings and the adjacent cleavage in glass and steel.

=== Katalog sound ornament – Music at One ===
Katalog (English: Catalogue) is a music piece composed specially for the Black Diamond by Danish composer Fuzzy as a new artistic decoration. It consists of an electroacoustic composition, around three minutes long, for every week of the year. Every day at 1 pm the composition is broadcast in the atrium via a permanent installation based on a computerized 12-channel loudspeaker system, in which every loudspeaker can be programmed individually. Four loudspeakers are installed in the ceiling of each of the three balcony levels.

With each of the 52 compositions inspired by one of the library's treasures, either a manuscript, a photo, a book, or a piece of music, it is intended as a tribute to and promotion of the library's collections and at the same time as an opportunity for the users to look up from their books and take a break.

== See also ==
- Architecture of Denmark
- List of concert halls in Copenhagen
- List of libraries in Denmark

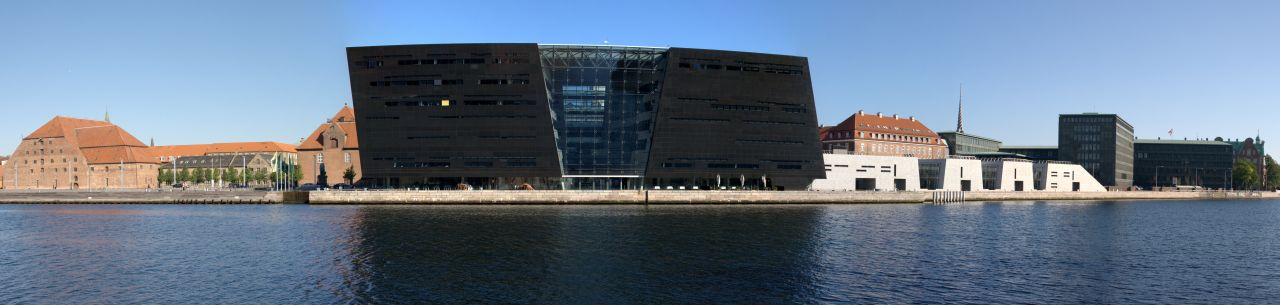
The Black Diamond seen from the harbour
