= Steingrímur =

Steingrímur (Icelandic pronunciation: [ˈsteinˌkriːmʏr̥]) or Steingrimur may refer to:

- Steingrímur Hermannsson (1928–2010), Icelandic politician
- Steingrímur Jóhannesson (1973–2012), Icelandic footballer
- Steingrímur Jónsson (1769–1845), Icelandic bishop
- Steingrimur Rohloff (born 1971), Icelandic-German composer
- Steingrímur J. Sigfússon (born 1955), Icelandic politician
- Steingrímur Steinþórsson (1893–1966), Icelandic politician
- Steingrímur Thorsteinsson (1831–1913), Icelandic poet and writer
