= Mr. Beard =

Mr. Beard may refer to:

- Bo Nat Khann Mway (1962–2016), Karen rebel commander in Myanmar
- Mikkel Lomborg (born 1971), Danish children's television presenter
