= War of the Birds =

- Danish DVD cover
- Directed by: Jannik Hastrup
- Written by: Bent Haller
- Produced by: Marie Bro (executive producer); Per Holst (producer)
- Starring: Sofie Bredesen; Vigga Bro; Lisbet Dahl; Pernille Hansen; Anne Marie Helger; Lasse Jonsson; Tine Karrebæk; Tommy Kenter; Per Tønnes Nielsen; Per Pallesen; Claus Ryskjær; Helle Ryslinge; Ove Sprogøe; Kasper Fønns Stilling; Emil Tarding; Barbara Topsøe-Rothenborg
- Cinematography: Jakob Koch
- Music by: Fuzzy; Jacob Groth; Søren Kragh-Jacobsen
- Production company: Dansk Tegnefilm
- Distributed by: Kærne Film
- Release date: 28 September 1990
- Running time: 65 minutes
- Country: Denmark
- Language: Danish
- Budget: 12 million DKK

War of the Birds (Danish: Fuglekrigen i Kanøfleskoven) is a 1990 Danish animated drama film directed by Jannik Hastrup, about two orphan birds, Oliver and Olivia, who fight against an evil vulture-like bird-of-prey with the help of two mice. It is based on a Danish children's book with a similar name ("Fuglekrigen", or "The Bird-War" in English) from the writer, Bent Haller.

== Plot ==
In a forest lives a peaceful community of birds, including a pair of sparrows residing happily in a nest awaiting the hatching of their seven eggs. During a storm, the sparrows are attacked and killed by Fagin, a sadistic and evil vulture-like black bird-of-prey who kills every bird in his path. The issuing struggle causes the seven eggs to fall out the nest with only one surviving and landing near a hole in the tree which is owned by Walter, an owl. Betty, a bluebird, comes and decides to adopt the egg. Some time later, the egg hatches and Betty names the chick Oliver. While Betty is away, Walter tells Oliver a story about Betty saving the dove from a cat. Betty goes to a nearby city and meets Olivia, an orphaned sparrow whose parents were also killed by Fagin, and adopts her as well. Betty introduces Olivia to Oliver, and the pair quickly become friends. Betty goes away again, and Oliver and Olivia wander off and befriend two orphaned mice named Fredrick and Ingolf. They play, but Ingolf, who dreams of flying like a bird, falls into a stream and is saved by the group. The dove appears again and warns them about Fagin, prompting them to run and hide, until Fagin is chased away by a human ornithologist and his dog. Betty finds them and scolds them for wandering off. In the end Oliver learns to fly with the help of Olivia.

Back home, Olivia starts to develop a crush on Oliver. The two wander off again to town where they eat at a small market, but encounter the same cat. Using the same trick Betty performed before, Olivia outwits the cat, causing him to crash into a box, angering the owner of the fruit stand and ridiculing the cat in front of the other birds. The birds go back to the forest where the dove tells Oliver and Olivia about Fagin. Oliver finds out his real parents were killed by Fagin and decides to fight him. First, he tries to gather several birds to fight Fagin, but they are too frightened to fight Fagin. Oliver, feeling left out, meets again with Armstrong the seagull who invites him to come to his party that night. Oliver comes back to the nest where Olivia teases him into falling in love with her. Walter goes out, and, during the night, Oliver and Olivia sneak off to Armstrong's party. Armstrong sings a song about not being afraid of Fagin, with Walter being there with a number of chickens. Oliver gains the birds' trust and plans to outwit Fagin with a trap.

The following day, Fredrick and Ingolf decide to help Oliver with his battle towards Fagin with the trap being set up with his friends along with Armstrong. However, Fagin hears the dove's talk about Oliver's plan to kill him and decides to fight and kill Oliver first. When Fagin arrives, Oliver tells Fagin about his parents, which he dismisses. Fagin attacks Olivia, Fredrick, and Ingolf. Oliver tries to save them, but is knocked unconscious by Fagin's wing. The dove alerts Betty about the situation. Fagin nearly kills Oliver, but is saved by Betty, who slashes Fagin in one of his eyes, making him half blind. He pursues Betty up to the storm clouds, where he apparently kills her. Oliver's friends carry him into a hollow log where Olivia tells him that Betty was killed saving him and the plan did not work, making him lose hope. After the storm, Oliver and Olivia go back to nest only to see the nest destroyed and Walter gone, leaving them orphaned once again. After a pair of blackbirds try to tell them the error of their ways, they wander off.

After nearly being attacked by a group of birds who have become fed up with their attempts to take down Fagin, Oliver gets angry with Olivia for teasing him to love her. Olivia sings to Oliver about how much she loves him, and Oliver decides to accept it and regains hope. Later on, the two young birds meet up with Fredrick and Ingolf again. Oliver and Armstrong form a plan to trap Fagin. Walter is actually nearby, searching for food, but is unaware of this. The dove comes and warns Oliver and Olivia, who look around for Fagin and see him now with one eye, due to his struggle with Betty. Oliver and Fagin battle one last time, with Oliver attempting to lead Fagin into the fire started by Ingolf. Fagin captures Olivia, and Oliver rescues her, but is seized by Fagin in the process. The dove rescues Oliver and grabs Fagin by the wings, trying to hurtle him into the fire. Fredrick and Olivia enter the fire to save Oliver. The dove's wing is crippled by Fagin, but Fagin realizes too late that his wing is burning, and both birds plummet into the fire to their deaths. Oliver's friends mourn him, but he recovers. Walter finds them with Armstrong, telling them they have finally defeated Fagin and all celebrate.

In the aftermath, the birds return to the forest, now in harmony without Fagin to threaten them. Oliver and Olivia have become mates and bear two children looking like them. Fredrick and Ingolf now take care of themselves and Walter tell stories to Oliver and Olivia's children. Ingolf makes one attempt to fly again, and is successful.

== Characters ==
- Oliver, a young red male sparrow. He lost his biological parents, who were killed by Fagin, along with their other eggs. He was adopted by a bluebird named Betty and Walter. After he meets Olivia, they become very close friends. He wants to avenge his parents' death.
- Olivia, a young blue female sparrow. Her parents were also killed by Fagin and she was saved from a cat by Betty. She has a crush on Oliver. At the end of the movie, Oliver and Olivia become mates and have two babies, a male and a female.
- Frederick (Danish: Frederik), a young mouse who is blue and tall and has a good relationship with Oliver and Olivia. He helps Oliver because he and his brother Ingolf lost their mother to Fagin and wants revenge on him.
- Ingolf, Frederick's brother. He is white-grayish and wears a crack of an egg on his head. He is very cheerful and helps Oliver fight Fagin. He has a dream to fly like a bird.
- Fagin, an sadistic, evil, cruel, ruthless, sinister and heartless bird. He is a black vulture-like bird-of-prey. Fagin is responsible for killing several animals, such as Oliver's parents and six unborn siblings, Olivia's parents, the mice's mother, and Betty. He is feared by the birds of the forest and of the city. Fagin attempts to kill Oliver and Olivia in his first encounter with them, but is scared away by a human and his dog. During the final battle, he is killed in the fire along with the dove.
- Betty, a female bluebird, who adopted Oliver and Olivia. She is a friend of the dove. She is caring, able and loving and adopts anyone who is orphaned. She rescues Oliver by scratching out one of Fagin's eyes, enraging the bird-of-prey, at the cost of her own life.
- Walter (Danish: Walther), an owl. He is Oliver and Olivia's adoptive father. He often drinks a lot and is friends with Armstrong the seagull and loves telling stories. When Betty dies, he went to go find Oliver and Olivia and found them after Fagin's death.
- The Dove (Danish: Duen), a female dove and Fagin's slave. She was saved by Betty from a cat in the city and soon was adopted when she was young and orphaned. She then becomes a slave to Fagin, who often abuses her in some way and Dove doesn't have a good relationship with him. She shows internal conflict when it comes to picking sides, for which, despite still being complicit in some way with Fagin's plans, she does try to warn the other birds when he is coming or when another bird is in danger. When she sees Fagin making off with Oliver, however, she finally stands up to Fagin and grabs him, pulling him down with her into the fire, killing them both.
- Armstrong, a carefree seagull. He often wears sunglasses and loves parties. He helps Oliver and Olivia fight Fagin.
- Two blackbirds (Danish: skader, "magpies"), who chat throughout the film.

== Voice cast ==
- Emil Tardini – Oliver as a child
- Lars Jonsson – Oliver as an adult
- Anne-Sofie Bredesen – Olivia as a child
- Barbara Rothenborg Topsøe – Olivia as an adult
- Claus Ryskjær – Fagin
- Tine Karrebæk – Frederik
- Kasper Fønns Stilling – Ingolf
- Lisbet Dahl – Betty
- Pernille Hansen – Papegøjen (The Parrot)
- Anne Marie Helger – Skade (Magpie)
- Tommy Kenter – Uglen (The Owl)
- Helle Ryslinge – Gadefugl (Street-bird)
- Per Tønnes Nielsen – Gadefugl (Street-bird)
- Per Pallesen – Armstrong
- Ove Sprogøe – Skade (Magpie)
- Vigga Bro – Duen (The Dove)

=== English dub ===
- Saffron Henderson – Oliver
- Cathy Weseluck – Olivia
- Paul Dobson – Fagin
- Don Brown – Frederick
- Scott McNeil - Ingolf, Walter, Armstrong
- Kathleen Barr - Betty
