= Samson & Sally =

- Directed by: Jannik Hastrup
- Written by: Bent Haller; Jannik Hastrup; Li Vilstrup
- Based on: The Song of the Whales by Bent Haller
- Produced by: Ebbe Preisler
- Starring: Jesper Klein; Helle Hertz; Per Pallesen; Bodil Udsen; Poul Thomsen; Kristen Peuliche; Berthe Qvistgaard; Claus Ryskjær; Preben Neergaard; Ole Ernst
- Cinematography: Jakob Koch
- Music by: Fuzzy
- Production companies: Dansk Tegnefilm; Atlantis Film (Note: At the beginning of the film, the Atlantis Film logo appears and then "Presents" in Danish.)
- Distributed by: Nordisk Film
- Release dates: 12 October 1984 (Denmark); 5 September 1986 (Sweden)
- Running time: 60 minutes
- Countries: Denmark; Sweden
- Language: Danish

Samson & Sally (a.k.a. Samson & Sally: The Song of the Whales) is a 1984 Danish-Swedish animated fantasy drama film, directed by Jannik Hastrup and based on the novel The Song of the Whales by Danish author Bent Haller.

== Plot ==
The film revolves around a young albino male sperm whale named Samson who strongly believes the legendary tales of Moby Dick. The legends say that Moby Dick was a hero for all whales, and that he will someday return. He meets Sally, a young black-and-white female sperm whale who is orphaned after her pod is slaughtered by whalers. Samson's pod adopts Sally and she befriends Samson even though she does not believe in Moby Dick. Samson and Sally together survive certain dangers, such as killer whales, a massive oil slick, radiation poisoning, and whaling ships, which they refer to as "iron beasts." Eventually Samson and Sally fall in love with each other. Samson's mother is later killed by the whalers, greatly saddening Samson. Samson decides to leave Sally and his pod to search for Moby Dick and convince him to try to save whales from whalers and the "iron beasts." After nearly dying several times, due to humans causing water pollution, Samson finds Moby Dick in the underwater ruins of Atlantis (which is actually New York City in a post-apocalyptic future), only to find that he is senile and too old to even forage for himself. Disappointed, Samson leaves to try to rejoin his pod. During a storm, Samson encounters the whaling ship that killed his mother, now sinking at sea with the crew adrift in a dingy. The captain fires a rifle at Samson, causing him to react by striking the dingy and capsizing it, killing the whalers. After days of searching, he gives up all hope of finding his pod, just before seeing them on the horizon. The film ends with a scene set decades later, with Samson and Sally as adult whales, caring for a single son, whom Samson saves from a killer whale.

== Characters ==
- Samson, an albino sperm whale who does not have any friends. (voiced by Jesper Klein)
- Sally, a rare black and white sperm whale who is the last of her kind and Samson's love interest. (voiced by Helle Hertz)
- Samson's Mother, a solid black whale who tells Moby Dick's story and is later sacrificed to save her son. (voiced by Bodil Udsen)
- Samson's Father, a rare black and white sperm whale similar to Sally's physical appearance who is the leader of Samson's pod.
- The Seagull, an unnamed seagull who assists Samson. (voiced by Per Pallesen)
- Whalers, a group of unnamed whale hunters who try to attack Samson and Sally's pods. Their ships are referred to as "Iron Beasts."
- Moby Dick, a legendary albino sperm whale.
- Killer Whales, a group of unnamed killer whales that have no speaking lines.
- The Walruses, a pair of unnamed dancing walruses who act as musicians. The big one is orange and the small one is pink.
- The Captain, the cruel leader of the whalers. (voiced by Ole Ernst)
- The Baleen Whale, an unnamed deep-voiced humpback whale. He only makes three scene appearances.
- The Dolphin, a bottlenose dolphin. She also helps Samson to avoid whalers.
- The Tortoise, a wise unnamed tortoise who lives in a rock in the middle of the ocean.
- Octopuses, enemies of Samson and Sally, and their primary source of food.

== Cast ==
| Character | Original | English |
|---|---|---|
| Samson | Jesper Klein | Unknown |
| Sally | Helle Hertz | Unknown |
| Seagull | Per Pallesen | Kathleen Fee |
| Samson's mother | Bodil Udsen | Unknown |
| Samson's father | Poul Thomsen | Unknown |
| Dolphin | Kirsten Peüliche | Unknown |
| Tortoise | Berthe Qvistgaard | Unknown |
| Baleen whale | Claus Ryskjær | Unknown |
| Moby Dick | Preben Neergaard | Unknown |
| Captain | Ole Ernst | Unknown |

== Themes ==
In one of the last scenes of the film Samson is swimming through the ruins of Atlantis. Throughout the film the characters refer to this city as "The City That Man Built". As he is leaving his encounter with Moby Dick he passes by the Statue of Liberty and the New York City Skyline both entirely underwater. Although a children's film this seems to indicate that they are living in some post-apocalyptic ocean on Earth. They also have large run-ins with radioactive waste and other masses of pollution on huge scales, notably during a song a pair of walruses sing. The film is a warning like all other post-apocalyptic stories. As Moby Dick himself comments, "Mankind is not vicious, mankind is stupid. Someday man will realize what he is doing. By killing everything in the sea he is killing himself. When the sea is dead mankind will die too."

== Release ==
Samson & Sally was first released in the United States on VHS by Just for Kids Home Video in 1990. This version has edited opening credits, a scene of a polar bear trying to pull a seal onto land and the seagull defecating on a whaler after tying him up removed. This version is also pan and scan.

In the United Kingdom, it was released on VHS by independent distributor Parkfield Publishing in 1989. This version is uncut and retains its original aspect ratio but is now extremely rare, possibly due to the low number of copies printed.

In Denmark, the DVD version was released on August 20, 2007. Despite its packaging stating an anamorphic 1.85:1 transfer, Dolby Digital 5.1 Danish audio, and additional Swedish, Finnish and Norwegian subtitles, it contains a non-anamorphic 1.66:1 transfer and Danish-only audio and subtitles for the hearing impaired. There are no extras.

The film has never been released on DVD outside Europe.
