= Ottawa Chamberfest =

Classical music festival in Ottawa, Canada

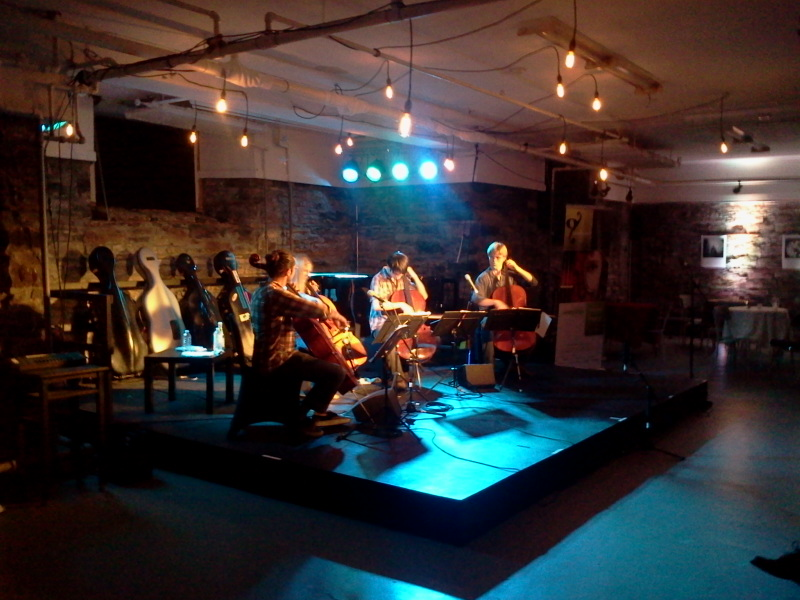
The Samurai String Quartet played covers of 90's grunge music, old Nintendo video games and television theme songs. This particular picture shows them playing "I'm Shipping Off to Boston" by the Dropkick Murphy's. The Quartet played until they were asked to leave at 2 am.

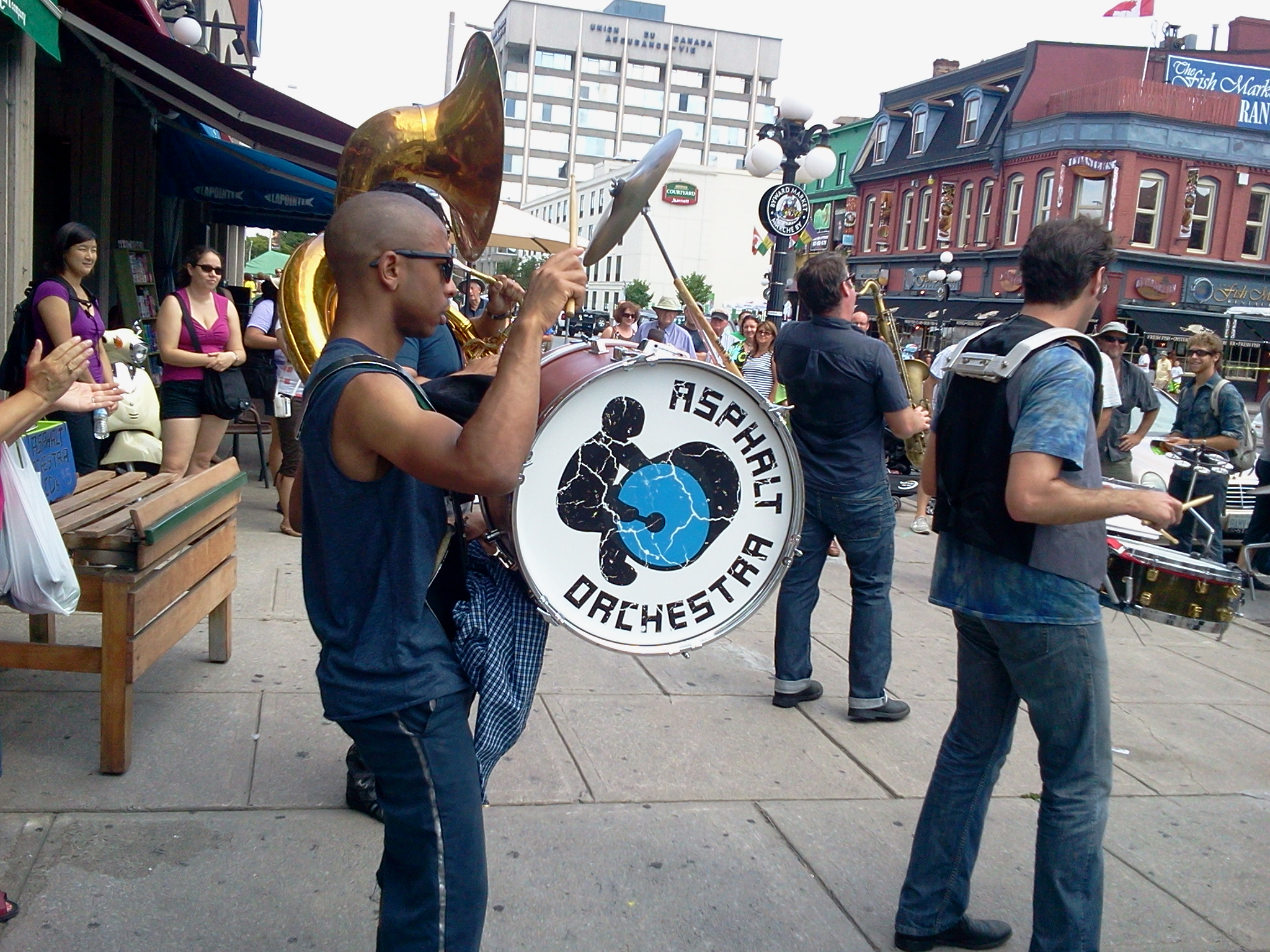
Asphalt Orchestra performing in Ottawa's Byward Market as part of the Guerrilla Gig series hosted by Ottawa Chamberfest 2011.

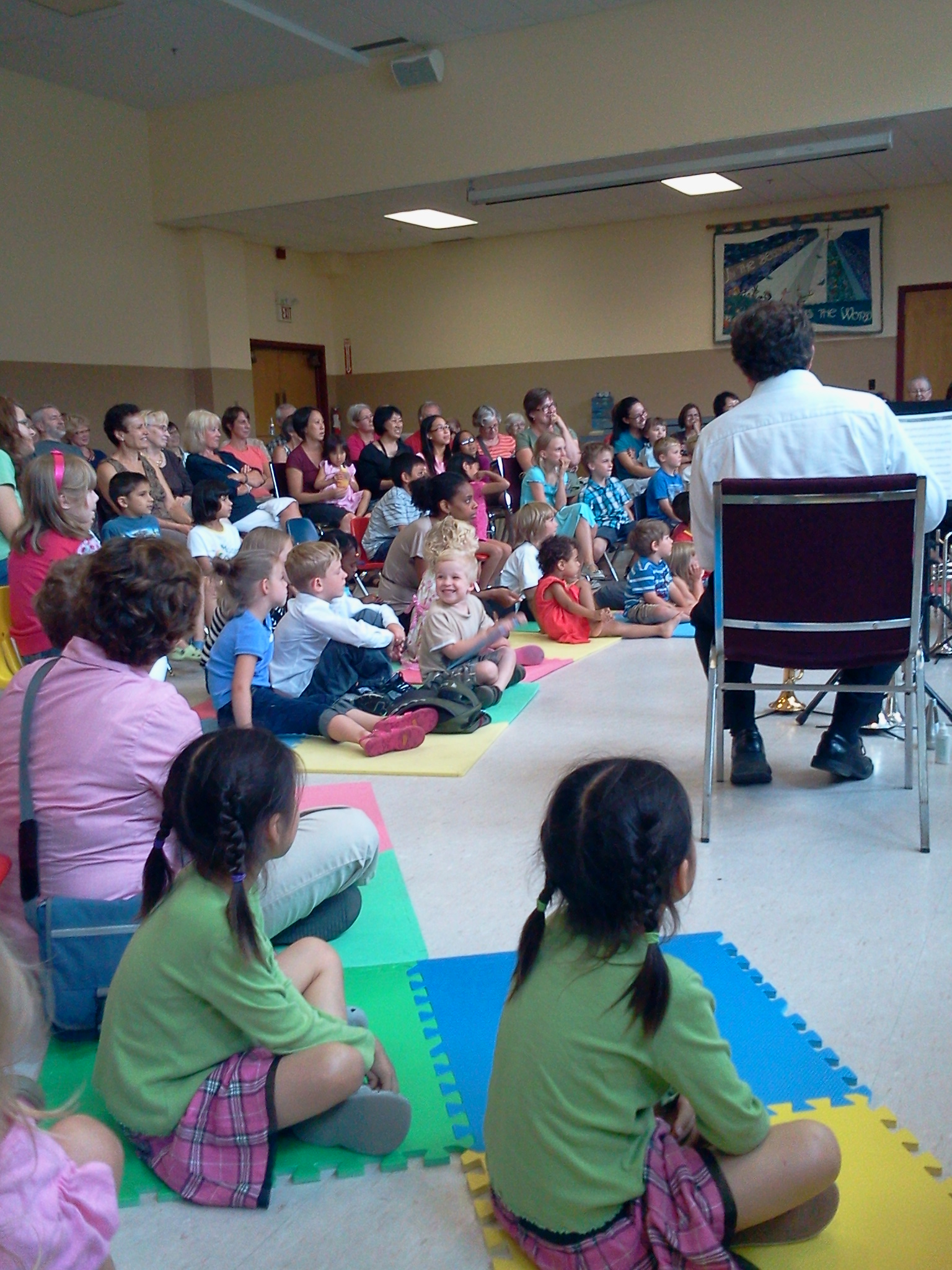
The Bring the Kids event hosted by Ottawa Chamberfest featuring True North Brass.

Ottawa Chamberfest is a music festival held by the Ottawa Chamber Music Society, also known as Chamberfest, in Ottawa, Ontario, Canada. The 2025 edition, running from Friday, July 18 – Sunday, July 27, will be packed with a rich array of musical offerings.

== History ==
In 1994, the idea of a chamber music festival in Ottawa came to life to address the availability of live classical music during the summer months. Ottawa Chamberfest started life as the Ottawa International Chamber Music Festival with 22 concerts in two churches and was an immediate hit. Artistic and executive director Julian Armor wanted to increase the popularity of classical music among citizens.

Growing steadily over the years, the 2011 edition of Ottawa Chamberfest presented almost 100 concerts, attracting over 80,000 listeners and is considered the largest chamber music festival of its kind in the world.

Roman Borys, the cellist of the Juno award-winning Gryphon Trio was the Artistic and Executive Director of Ottawa Chamberfest from 2007 to 2020. His fellow trio members, violinist Annalee Patipatanakoon and pianist James Parker, were among the organization's artistic advisors.

The current Artistic Director is Carissa Klopoushak, also a founding member of the Ironwood Quartet and a member of the National Arts Centre Orchestra.

== Artists ==
Past performers at the festival include Angela Hewitt, Janina Fialkowska, Jan Lisiecki, Isabel Bayrakdarian, Simone Dinnerstein, Marc-André Hamelin, Julie Nesrallah, Yehonatan Berick, National Arts Centre Orchestra, The Swingle Singers, Nexus (ensemble), Trio con Brio Copenhagen, New Zealand String Quartet, Borodin String Quartet, the Beaux Arts Trio, the Tokyo String Quartet, Martin Beaver, Penderecki Quartet, Paul Stewart, Gino Quilico, St. Lawrence Quartet, Danish String Quartet, Nadia Sirota, and Tom Allen.

== Music ==
Although the concerts are primarily traditional Western classical music, the scope has evolved to embrace music from other traditions, including pop and jazz composers, as well as the classical music of non-European traditions.

== Venues ==
Chamberfest concert venues include churches or cultural facilities across Ottawa.

- Dominion-Chalmers United Church, now the Carleton Dominion-Chalmers Centre, is used by Chamberfest for many of its Festival concerts, but also for its Concert Series in the winter months.
- Rideau Hall is the site of community programming during the summer festival.
- Beechwood Cemetery, particularly the non-denominational Beechwood Sacred Space, is used both for the Festival and for Adaptive Concerts designed for neurodivergent audiences.
- Ottawa City Hall is used both for free community programming during the Festival, and for noon-hour spring concerts.
- Sites at the National Arts Centre are also used for community programming.

Chamberfest also partners with the University of Ottawa to offer Master Classes at their site.

== Other activities ==
In addition to their annual summer festival, Ottawa Chamberfest also organizes activities throughout the year. The Concert Series takes place from fall to spring offering approximately ten concerts per season. CEE: Community Engagement and Education engages community members of all ages in a suite of free music experiences.
