= Lomborg =

Lomborg is a surname. Notable people with the surname include:

- Bjørn Lomborg (born 1965), Danish author
- Mikkel Lomborg (born 1971), Danish children's television presenter
