= Povl Kjøller =

Danish musician (1937–1999)

Povl Kjøller Nielsen (June 3, 1937 – September 11, 1999) was a Danish composer, guitarist, teacher, pedagogue and tv host.

Povl Kjøller is known for the songs Min Cykel (My bike) (also called Cykelsangen (The Bicycle Song)) and Bakke snagvendt (Talk in reverse). Many of his songs were a part of the program Legestue (playroom) together with the puppet duo Kaj og Andrea, which he co-hosted with Kjeld Nørgaard from 1971 to 1975. He was originally trained as a music teacher, but had great success in the 1970'es with his jazz-influenced songs for children, which was often suitable for music education in schools and kindergartens. In his career Kjøller released many albums and starred in children's television on the Danish television station DR, often together with Iben Wurbs and Trille.

In the 90'es he experienced a powerful renaissance with his music and made a big comeback at the Midtfyns Festival in Ringe 1994, when he played to full houses. All the audience knew the songs by heart because Kjøller songs had formed the sound stage of most of their childhood. This situation continued at many venues across the country. At the same time several copy bands appeared, that were based on Kjøller songs and music, for example the West Zealand band The Kjøllers.

Povl Kjøller worked, until his unexpected and sudden death from thrombosis, at the Skovtofte Social Pedagogical Seminary, partly as a music teacher, where he inspired many students of pedagogy with his joy of all sorts of rhythmic music. His bequeathed tape and manuscript collection is in the possession of the Danish Royal Library.

== See also ==
- List of Danish composers
