= Flemming Quist Møller =

Danish director, cartoonist, author, and actor (1942–2022)

- Møller in the 2010s
- Born: Flemming Oluf Quist Møller; May 19, 1942; Denmark
- Died: January 31, 2022 (aged 79); Copenhagen, Denmark
- Occupations: Film director Actor; Screenwriter
- Years active: 1964-2020
- Known for: Jungledyret Hugo
- Spouse: Anne-Lise Larsen (m. 1995)
- Children: Carl Quist Møller
- Parent: Asger Quist Møller

Signature
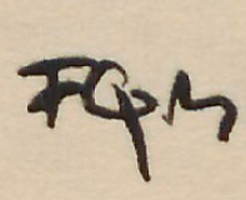

Flemming Oluf Quist Møller (19 May 1942 – 31 January 2022) was a Danish director, cartoonist, children's author, drummer, screenwriter, and actor.

== Career ==
As a director, he started with small experimental animation, often in collaboration with Jannik Hastrup. He made contributions as a children's author, and in a totally different ballgame, he was co-author of Anders Refn films such as Strømer (1976), The Heritage (1978) and Black Harvest (1993).

Central to Quist Møller's sprawling work stands the cartoon Benny's Bathtub (1971) which he wrote the script for and directed together with Jannik Hastrup. It was selected by the Danish Ministry of Culture in 2006 as one of the ten most important Danish films ever. The film about a boy's colorful dream life in a modern apartment building is a musical satire of regimentation and an appeal to the playful imagination – characteristics include Quist Møller's work in many fields. In 1971 he and Hastrup received Danish Film Critics Association's Bodil Honorary Award for Benny's Bathtub.

The charming Jungledyret Hugo (1993), which he both wrote and co-directed, was so successful that there were two sequels: Jungledyret Hugo 2 – den store filmhelt (1996) and Jungledyret Hugo 3 – fræk, flabet og fri (2007). The drawing style had become rounder, and his tone more family friendly. Cykelmyggen og Dansemyggen (2007) is based in the same musical legend style upon Quist Møller's own children's books about Cykelmyggen Egon.

Quist Møller was a percussionist in Bazaar with Peter Bastian and Anders Koppel.

In 1994 Quist Møller received a Bodil Honorary Award for his total stake in Danish film.

He died from a heart attack on 31 January 2022 in Copenhagen at the age of 79.

== Filmography ==
Work	Year	Credit	Notes
Into The Darkness	2020	Writer	TV film
Mini and the Mozzies	2014	Direction	Feature
Beyond Beyond	2014	Voice	Feature
The Great Bear	2011	Voice	Feature
Jungledyret Hugo 3 - fræk, flabet og fri	2007	Direction	Feature
A Tale of Two Mozzies	2007	Direction	Feature
The Fairytaler	2004	Voice	TV series
Move Me	2003	Script consultant	Feature
Jungledyret Hugo 2 – den store filmhelt	1996	Direction	Feature
Fæhår & Harzen	1995	Gamle Ole	TV series
Jungledyret Hugo	1993	Direction	Feature
Black Harvest	1993	Script	Feature
Slaget på tasken	1993	Script	TV film
Brudevalsen	1991	Appearance	Short fiction
Emma's Shadow	1988	Screenplay assistance	Feature
Een gang strømer...	1987	Script	TV series
Kedsomhedens svøbe	1986	Direction	Documentary
De flyvende djævle	1985	Journalist	Feature
Ladies on the rocks	1983	Lennart, rockmusiker	Feature
Det usynlige pattebarn	1982	Direction	Short fiction
Snuden i byen	1980	Script	Short fiction
Snuden rejser hjemmefra	1980	Script	Short fiction
Snuden vender hjem	1980	Script	Short fiction
Jul og grønne skove	1980	Appearance	TV series
Who is Murdering Who?	1978	Appearance	Feature
The Heritage	1978	Script	Feature
Strømer	1976	Script	Feature
When Svante Disappeared	1975	Kriminaltegner	Feature
Prenez le Comme un Homme	1975	Bent, Eriks kollega	Feature
Kroppens træning og udtryk II	1975	Music	Documentary
The Girl and the Dream Castle	1974	Trikki	Feature
Prince Piwi	1974	Direction	Feature
Historiebogen 6: Midlertidige løsninger på problemerne	1974	Voiceover	Documentary
Historiebogen 5: Triumfens symfoni	1974	Voiceover	Documentary
Historiebogen 8: Natten er dyster	1974	Voiceover	Documentary
Historiebogen 3: Fremtiden er lys ... for nogen	1973	Voiceover	Documentary
Man må da selv kunne lave den børnehave	1973	Animation	Documentary
Mor, jeg har patienter	1972	Leder af kollektiv	Feature
Nu går den på Dagmar	1972	Mand på værtshus	Feature
Historiebogen 2: I daggryet trodses alle farer	1972	Voiceover	Documentary
Historiebogen 1: Et flakkende lys i mørket	1972	Voiceover	Documentary
Historiebogen 4: Blodige forberedelser	1972	Voiceover	Documentary
Benny's Bathtub	1971	Direction	Short fiction
AWOL	1971	Appearance	Feature
The Case of the Missing Clerk	1971	Soldat, der finder liget	Feature
Lost in the Sand	1971	Badeløven	Feature
Nattens frelse	1971	Animation	TV film
Ikke et ord om Harald	1970	Ølmand	TV film
Drengen og månen	1968	Animation	Short fiction
Sommerfuglen ønsker tillykke	1968	Music	Short fiction
God morgen	1968	Direction	Short fiction
Sonja	1968	Kaj, Gladys' ven	TV series
It don't mean a thing	1967	Direction	Experimental
Slambert	1966	Direction	Experimental
Børnenes ulandskalender 1966	1966	Direction	TV series
Concerto erotica	1964	Direction	Experimental

== Awards ==
- 1971 Danish Film Critics Association's Bodil Honorary Award for Benny's Bathtub
- 1994 Danish Film Critics Association's Bodil Honorary Award for lifetime achievements
