= Jytte Abildstrøm =

Danish actress (1934–2025)

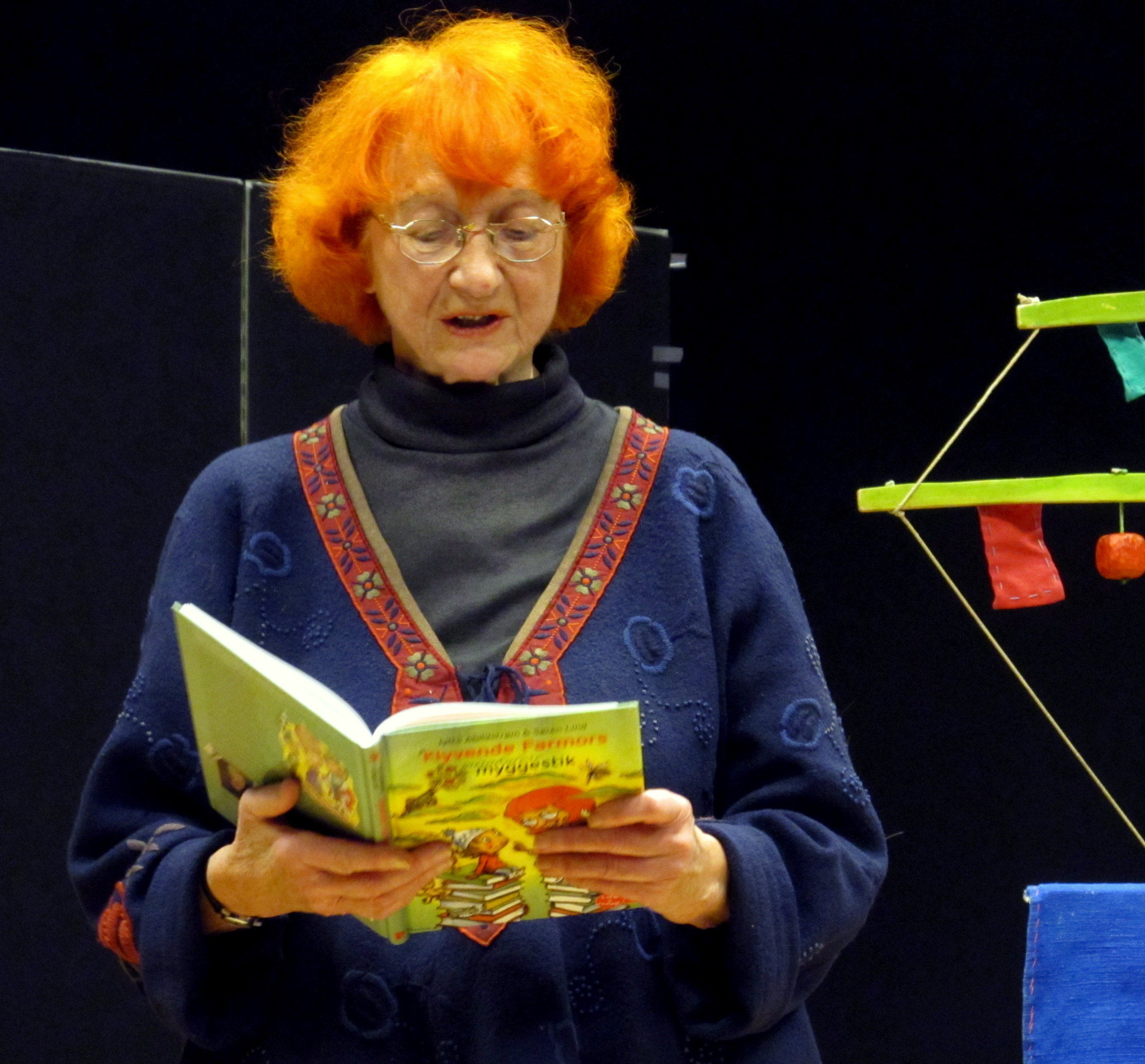
- Abildstrøm in 2012
- Born: 25 March 1934; Copenhagen, Denmark
- Died: 2 January 2025 (aged 90); Hellerup, Denmark
- Occupation: Actress
- Years active: 1956–2025

Jytte Abildstrøm (25 March 1934 – 2 January 2025) was a Danish film and theatre actress, and theatre manager. She appeared in 40 films between 1956 and 2006. She was born in Copenhagen, Denmark. She and her husband Søren Mygind are the parents of Peter Mygind.

In December 2024, the family confirmed that Abildstrøm had been admitted to hospice care. She died on 2 January 2025, two months shy of her 91st birthday.

== Filmography ==
- Julestjerner (2012)
- Der var engang en dreng (2006)
- Freak Show 2003 (2003)
- Flyvende farmor (2001)
- Prop og Berta (2000)
- Dykkerne (2000)
- Hannibal & Jerry (1997)
- Jungledyret Hugo (1993)
- Felix (1982)
- Usynlige pattebarn, Det (1982)
- The Adventures of Picasso (1978)
- Prins Piwi (1974)
- Mafiaen - det er osse mig! (1974)
- Fra Poetens pen - et udpluk af nye og gamle tekster skrevet af Poul Sørensen (1974)
- Askepot (1973)
- Høgejumfruen (1973)
- Hashtræet (1973)
- Mannen som slutade röka (1972)
- Mor, jeg har patienter (1972)
- Den forsvundne fuldmægtig (1971)
- Revolutionen i vandkanten (1971)
- Bennys badekar (1971)
- Svend, Knud og Valdemar (1970)
- Snedronningen (1970)
- Ikke et ord om Harald (1970)
- Kameldamen (1969)
- Far laver sovsen (1967)
- Thomas er fredløs (1967)
- Mig og min lillebror (1967)
- Kærligheden varer længst (1967)
- Soyas tagsten (1966)
- Min søsters børn (1966)
- Hold da helt ferie (1965)
- Sytten (1965)
- Don Olsen kommer til byen (1964)
- Fem mand og Rosa (1964)
- Sommer i Tyrol (1964)
- Soldaterkammerater på efterårsmanøvre (1961)
- Forelsket i København (1960)
- Helle for Helene (1959)
- Poeten og Lillemor (1959)
- Vi som går stjernevejen (1956)
