= Kaj & Andrea =

- Created by: DR
- Written by: Katrine Hauch-Fausbøll; Kjeld Nørgaard
- Country of origin: Denmark
- No. of episodes: 183

Production
- Running time: 20 minutes

Original release
- Network: DR
- Release: 8 March 1971 – 10 March 2007

Kaj and Andrea is a Danish children's television show about two puppet characters, a male frog named Kaj and a female parrot named Andrea. They sing, play and talk with the human presenters. The show ran on DR TV 1971–1975 (83 episodes) and again 1996–2007 (100 episodes).

Andrea started out as a character on the children's programme Legestue and first appeared on 8 March 1971. Kaj was introduced to the show later on after Jimmy Stahr, the head of pre-school programmes at Danmarks Radio, had seen the American TV children's show Sesame Street. He was generally unimpressed by the programme's content and decided not to buy it, but liked Kermit the Frog and suggested Legestue should have a frog of its own.

Clips were featured in an episode of Mister Rogers' Neighborhood.

== Cast ==
- Kjeld Nørgaard as Kaj
- Hanne Willumsen as Andrea
- Povl Kjøller as Narrator
