= Benny's Bathtub =

- DVD cover
- Directed by: Jannik Hastrup; Flemming Quist Møller
- Written by: Flemming Quist Møller
- Produced by: Anni Holst; Per Holst
- Starring: Peter Belli; Jesper Klein; Trille; Jytte Abildstrøm
- Cinematography: Poul Dupont
- Edited by: Henrik Carlsen
- Music by: Hans-Henrik Ley
- Distributed by: Fiasco Film
- Release date: 6 March 1971
- Running time: 41 minutes
- Country: Denmark
- Language: Danish

Benny's Bathtub (Original title: Bennys badekar) is a 1971 Danish animated film directed by Jannik Hastrup and Flemming Quist Møller. The film is the story of a boy who flees the boring world of adults into a magical land in the bottom of his bathtub. The film featured the voices and songs of Peter Belli, Otto Brandenburg and Povl Dissing as well as the jazz music of Kenny Drew and Niels-Henning Ørsted Pedersen. Benny's Bathtub received a special Bodil Award for animated film in 1971. The film and its music became a cult hit in Denmark. It is one of the ten films chosen for Denmark's cultural canon by the Danish Ministry of Culture.

== Plot ==
The protagonist is a young child named Benny who is bored in his flat building because his parents are too busy to play or chat to him. Benny captures a tadpole outside and brings it inside to put it in the bathtub. Benny discovers the tadpole is an enchanted prince, who dives with Benny to the bottom of the bathtub and into a magical ocean world. In this fantastic world Benny meets pirates, mermaids and an octopus and experiences the things he misses in his daily life.

== Cast ==
- Bo Jakobsen as Benny
- Jesper Klein as Haletudsen
- Peter Belli as Blæksprutten
- Jytte Abildstrøm as Dagny
- Otto Brandenburg as Hummerdrengen
- Jytte Hauch-Fausbøll as Bennys mor
- Rolf Krogh as Ornitologen
- Povl Dissing as Sørøver
- Per Bentzon Goldschmidt as Sørøver
- Per Tønnes Nielsen as Cowboy
- Aya as Havfrue
- Maia Årskov as Havfrue
- Trille (Bodil Trille Nielsen) as Havfrue
- Christian Sievert as Krabbe
