= Cirkeline =

Danish comic book character

Cirkeline (Eng: Circleen) is a Danish comic book character, created by Hanne Hastrup in 1957. The character is a little elf with spiky black hair, who wears a red dress with black dots and prefers walking barefoot.

Between 1968 and 1971, the comic was adapted for a series of animated shorts, when Hanne Hastrup wrote the scripts and Jannik Hastrup animated and produced 19 short films for the Danish public TV station Danmarks Radio. The last of the short films, Flugten Fra Amerika (Escape from America) has an anti-American message that prevented it from being broadcast. No new Cirkeline films were released until 1998.

The first Cirkeline book was published in 1969, and in 1998, she took the leap to the big cinema screen in the first of 3 feature films. Cirkeline became a brand, which has grown stronger and stronger ever since and today there are 9 books, music CDs and a range of products from underwear to cups and plates.

Several of the film's songs, written by Hans-Henrik Ley, have become classics - e.g. "Bim, Bam, Busse" ("Mile, Male, Mole"), "Snemusen Knud" ("Knut the Snowmouse") and "Cirkeline har fødselsdag" ("Circleen's birthday").

The character has been loved by children for generations, and has her own app and a significant following on Facebook.

== Films ==
Cirkeline appears in the following animated feature-length films:

- Circleen: City Mouse, Cirkeline: Storbyens mus (1998, Denmark)
- Circleen: Mice and Romance, Cirkeline 2: Ost og Kærlighed (2000, Denmark)
- Circleen and World's smallest superhero, Cirkeline og Verdens mindste superhelt (2004, Denmark)
- Circleen, Coco and the Wild Rhino, Cirkeline, Coco og det vilde næsehorn (2018, Denmark)

== Video Games ==
Circleen: City Mouse (1998, PC), an interactive story-game based on the film of the same name was released on CD-ROM in 1998. The game was developed by Gonzoft.

The mobile game Cirkeline (2012, iOS) was released on the 12th of January 2012. The game was developed by Betapilot.

== Stamps ==
In 2002, Post Danmark (the Danish postal service) made four postage stamp featuring Danish comic book characters. The stamps featured Cirkeline, Valhalla, Rasmus Klump, and Jungledyret Hugo.
