= Lise Bach Hansen =

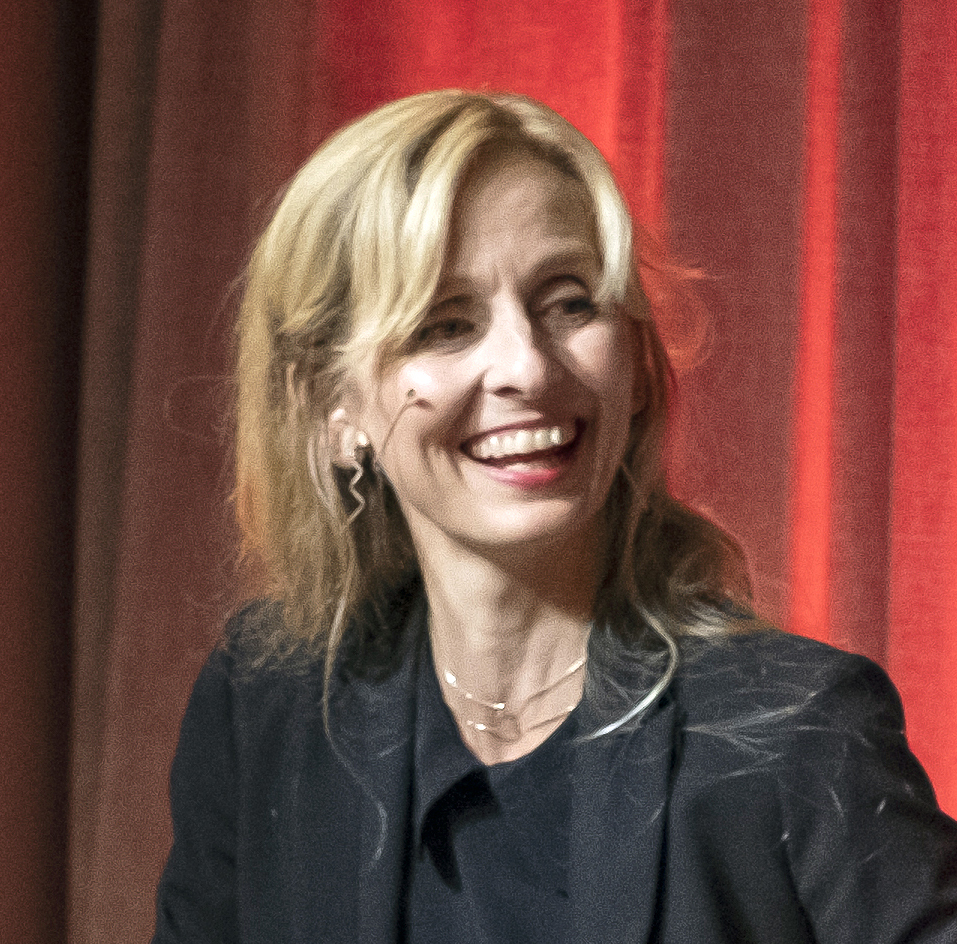
- Born: Bording, Denmark
- Occupation: Host
- Known for: Literary conversations at The Royal Library, Denmark

Lise Bach Hansen is a Danish author, interviewer and host. She organizes the live literature program at The Royal Library, Denmark and hosts literary conversations for the library's public program series: International Authors' Stage. Since 2008 the program has turned The Royal Library into Copenhagen's principal venue for live conversations, featuring international writers, intellectuals, politicians and artists. She is an advocate of cultural diplomacy, contributing to periodicals on economics and politics.

== Early life and education ==
Lise Bach Hansen was born in Bording, Denmark. Her father, Søren Christian Hansen (1945–1993), was a playwright, novelist and documentalist. She is the mother of two daughters. Their father is the German composer Steingrimur Rohloff. Hansen has received a master's degree, a Mémoire de Diplome d’Etudes Aproffondie from the Ecole Doctorale at Université Paris X, Nanterre University and Université Paris III, La Sorbonne. Her memoir compared 17th-century French classical theatre with the works of the Danish playwright Ludvig Holberg (1684–1754) considered to be the founder of Danish and Norwegian literature. In 2000 she earned a master's degree in communication from Roskilde University in Denmark.

== The Royal Library ==
In 2008, Hansen founded "International Forfatterscene", a conversation series with writers, intellectuals, artists and politicians. As head of the series and of a program for students, "Students Only!", Hansen has developed conversations with international personalities, including Alex Schulman, Kofi Annan, Dario Fo, Hillary Clinton, Salman Rushdie, Herta Müller, Siri Hustvedt, Bernard-Henri Lévy, Slavoj Žižek, Thomas Piketty, Günter Grass and Ban Ki-moon. She has worked in partnership with such organizations as Siemens, PEN, UN, Institut Français and The Goethe Institute.

== Career ==
Before founding The International Authors Stage at The Royal Library in Copenhagen, she was involved in communication and public relations within professional fields such as film, art, theatre and politics in both Paris and Copenhagen and she has held positions at The European Parliament in Brussels and the Danish art gallery, Kunstforeningen Gl. Strand in Copenhagen. Her interest in French language, politics and culture has influenced her career and she striven to present French artists, thinkers and writers to a Danish audience both through her writing and in her programming. She was behind an extensive initiative project for translating six of Ludvig Holberg¨s plays from Danish into modern French. The project was made in collaboration with La Maison Antoine Vitez in France and the translations were published by Editions Théâtrales in Paris. On January 18, 2018, she received the French order Arts et Lettres at the French embassy in Copenhagen.

Throughout her professional life, she has undertaken cultural exchange projects in the Nordic Region. Nordic values on sustainability, cultural heritage, gender equality and climate protection have been priorities which resulted in the book and the transatlantic project Arctic Imagination. developed in cooperation with Paul Holdengräber

=== Nord55° ===
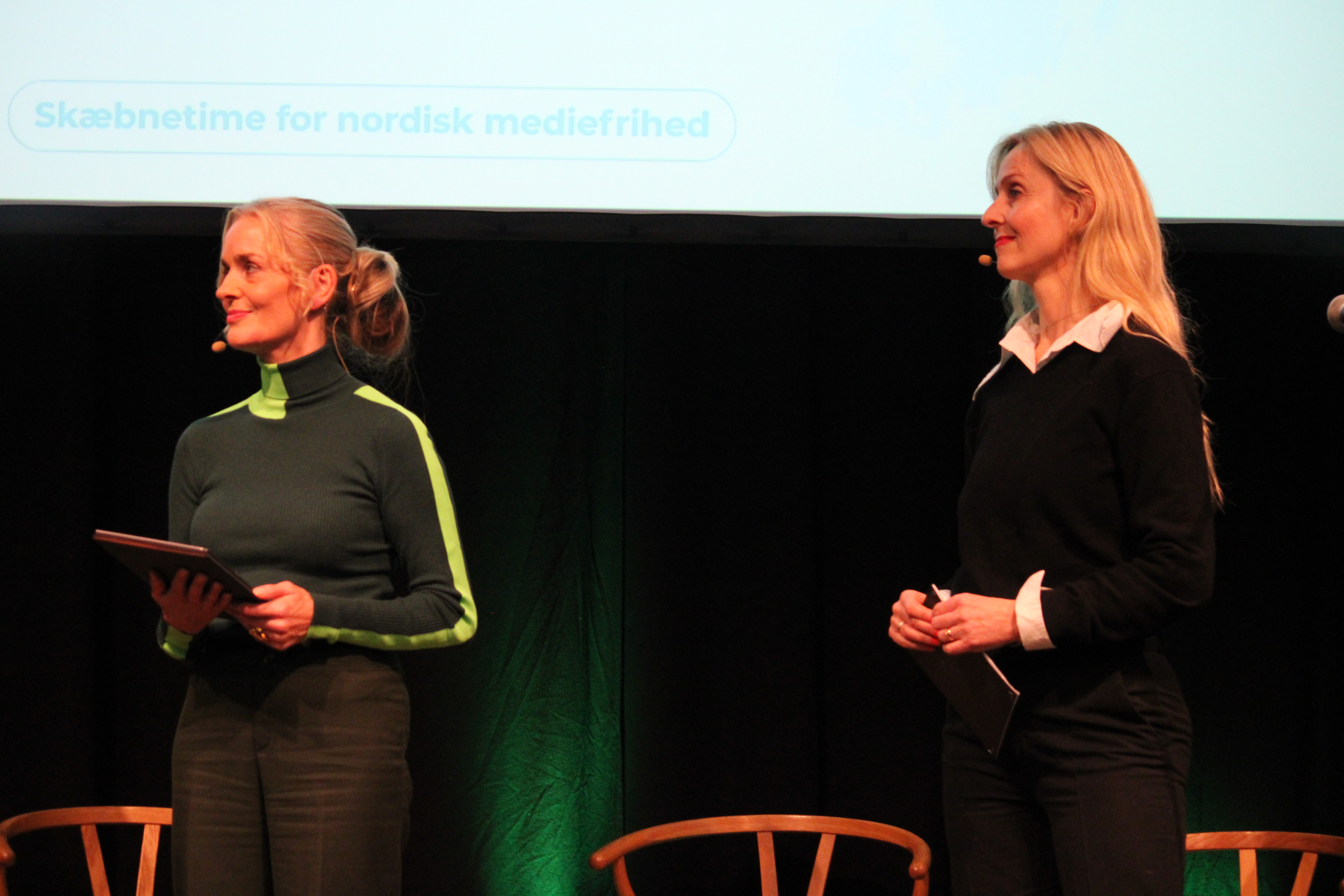
Bach Hansen with Hilde Sandvik at an Nord55° event in Copenhagen, November 2025

Hansen serves as a co-founder and the daily leader of Nord55°, a media and cultural platform supported by prominent Nordic media organizations. The initiative seeks to increase public engagement with Nordic culture, organize annual Nordic cultural summits, and disseminate cultural news and updates through newsletters across the Nordic countries.

== Publications ==
Her writings on contemporary cultural tendencies have been published in the European cultural magazine, Lettre International, as well as in Danish newspapers such as Politiken, Berlingske Tidende, Information and French magazines such as Minotaure, Théâtre Public and P:U:C:K. She was the editor-in-chief of the Danish cultural magazine Diamanten, contributing articles on literature and cultural heritage. In October 2019 her book, Sæt scenen: Kunsten at kuratere live-events, was published by Djøf Forlag. Her co-writer is Barbara Læssøe Stephensen. The book is about how to curate great live events and how to launch innovative artistic visions. Aimed at both students and professionals, it is based on her experience in the field, as well as on her research into international examples of best practice, while drawing on her theoretical background in dramaturgy, communication, rhetoric and literature.
