= Bazaar (band) =

Danish musical group

Bazaar (1976–2012) was a Danish band. Their music, which featured improvisation, has been classified as world, folk and jazz.

The band was dissolved in 2012, playing their last concert in July.

== Members ==
- Peter Bastian: bassoon, clarinet, ocarina, percussion
- Anders Koppel: Hammond B-3 Orgel
- Flemming Quist Møller: Congas, bongos, drums, darbuka

== Discography ==
- Bazaar Live (1978)
- Gibbon Jump (1980)
- Nimbus (1983)
- Gypsy Joker (1986)
- En Gudedrøm (1987)
- Live In Concert (1987)
- Bazaar Musik (1993)
- Trilogy (2006)
- Vintage (2008)
- Play Bazaar (2018)
