= The Great Bear (film) =

2011 film

- Film poster
- Directed by: Esben Toft Jacobsen
- Written by: Esben Toft Jacobsen; Jannik Tai Mosholt
- Produced by: Petter Lindblad
- Starring: Markus Rygaard
- Distributed by: Copenhagen Bombay; Film i Väst
- Release date: 10 February 2011
- Running time: 75 minutes
- Country: Denmark
- Languages: Danish; English

The Great Bear (Danish: Den kæmpestore bjørn) is a 2011 Danish computer animated adventure film directed by Esben Toft Jacobsen. The film was also translated to English for international viewers.

== Cast ==
Danish version:

- Markus Rygaard as Jonathan (voice)
- Alberte Blichfeldt as Sophie (voice)
- Flemming Quist Møller as Jægeren (voice)
- Elith Nulle Nykjær as Morfar (voice)

English version:

- Oliver Lambert as Jonathan (voice)
- Lilly Lambert as Sophie (voice)
- Jules Werner as The Hunter (voice)
- Adrian Diffey as Grandfather (voice)

Dutch version:

- Machiel Verbeek as Jonathan (voice)
- Lotte Kuijt as Sophie (voice)
- Jan Nonhof as Grandfather (voice)

== See also ==
- Copenhagen Bombay
