= The Thralls =

- Directed by: Jannik Hastrup
- Written by: Jannik Hastrup
- Starring: Otto Brandenburg
- Distributed by: Nordisk Film
- Release date: 1978
- Running time: 84 min.
- Country: Denmark
- Language: Danish

The Thralls (Danish: Trællene) is a Danish animated historical TV series from 1978–1980 directed by Danish animator Jannik Hastrup and based on Sven Wernström's book series Trälarna. The series tells about life at the bottom of society in Sweden from around 1000 until the middle of the 19th century. The series is in three sections, each with three parts that can be viewed independently of each other.
