= Peter Bastian =

Danish musician

Peter Bastian OD
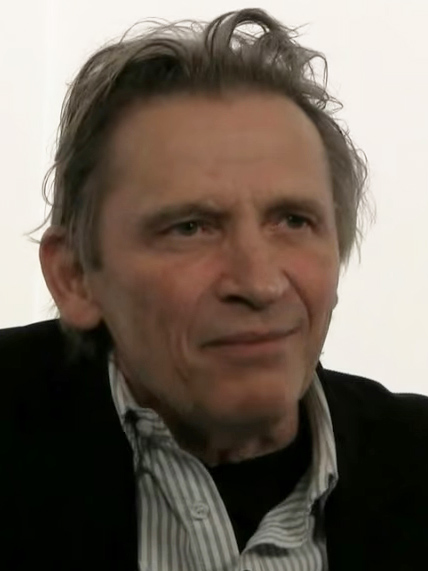
- Bastian in 2012

Background information
- Born: 25 August 1943; Copenhagen, Denmark
- Died: 27 March 2017 (aged 73)
- Genres: Classical
- Occupation(s): Musician, author
- Instrument: Bassoon
- Formerly of: The Danish Wind Quintet; Bazaar

Peter Bastian (25 August 1943 – 27 March 2017) was a Danish musician. He was born in Copenhagen and was educated in both theoretical physics and classical bassoon. He was a member of The Danish Wind Quintet (Den Danske Blæserkvintet) and the Danish band Bazaar. In 1998 he was knighted in the Order of the Dannebrog. He is the author of two books published by Gyldendal, "Ind i Musikken" 1987 and "Mesterlære – en livsfortælling" 2011.
