= Jannik Hastrup =

Danish writer (born 1941)

Jannik Hastrup (born 4 May 1941 in Næstved, Denmark) is a Danish writer, director, producer, illustrator and animator. He is considered "Denmark's grand master of animation", as he is particularly well known for directing, animating and writing several animated films, occasionally with Flemming Quist Møller, including Benny's Bathtub, Dreaming of Paradise, Samson & Sally, War of the Birds, The Monkeys and the Secret Weapon, The Boy Who Wanted to Be a Bear and A Tale of Two Mozzies. He also directed, wrote and animated a number of shorts following Cirkeline the elf. He also founded his own animation studio called "Dansk Tegnefilm".

== Politics ==
Jannik Hastrup was involved in films with socialist and social realism themes. One of them is the Cirkeline short film Flugten fra Amerika (Escape from America), which portrays a racist and poverty-filled New York City, followed by the Statue of Liberty with Richard Nixon's face and a rifle held above, and sympathetic portrayals of the Black Panther Party and a Native American tribe. The film was political enough that the public Danish Broadcasting Corporation refused to air it. Other works with political messages include Historiebogen and Trællene.

== Feature films ==
- Cykelmyggen og Minibillen (2014)
- Cykelmyggen og Dansemyggen (2007)
- Cirkeline og Verdens mindste superhelt (2004)
- Drengen der ville gøre det umulige (2002)
- Cirkeline – Ost og Kærlighed (2000)
- Cirkeline – Storbyens Mus (1998)
- H.C. Andersen og den skæve skygge (1998)
- Aberne og det hemmelige våben (1995)
- Fuglekrigen i Kanøfleskoven (1990)
- Dreaming of Paradise (1986)
- Samson og Sally (1984)
- The Thralls (1980)
- Bennys badekar (1971)

== Short films ==
- Blot en drengestreg / Just a prank' (2015)
- Tefik, når du falder skal du rejse dig igen / Tefik, when you fall you get back up again (2014)
- Asylbarn – Jamila, Gid jeg kunne flyve / Jamila, if only I could fly (2013)
- Asylbarn – Solén, Jeg altid husker far / Solén, I always remember daddy (2013)
- Cirkeline i Fandango / Circleen in Fandango (2010)
- Krig og kager / War & Peas (2006)
- You've got sugar (2005)
- Eventyret om den dårlige samvittighed / A Tale about The Guilty Conscience (2005)
- Hund & fisk / Dog & Fish (2001)
- Tango jalousie (1996)
- Birdland – A History of Jazz – 4 episoder (1995)
- Havets sang / Song of the Sea (1993)
- Det er bare os høns / Aint Nobody here but us chickens (1992)
- Bjarne og Britas vidunderlige verden 1-5 / The Wonderfull World of Barney and Betty (1991)
- Take Care (1988)
- Trylle og tøjdyrene 1 – den gyldne ring / Magic Mary and her puppets (1985)
- Trylle og tøjdyrene 2 – En rævepels (1985)
- Roji Negra (1985)
- Hvordan det videre gik den grimme ælling / The further adventures of the Ugly Duckling (1982)
- Trællene (The Thralls) – 9 episoder (1980)
- Hellere rask og rig end syg og fattig / Better rich and healthy than poor and sick (1977)
- Historiebogen / The Historybook – 9 episoder (1973)
- Ønskebenet / The Wishbone (1972)
- Cirkeline / Circleen – 19 episoder (1967–71)
- Bennys Badekar / Bennys Bathtub (1970)
- Regnbuen / The Rainbow (1969)
- Flodhesten / The Hippo (1969)
- Det store slæderøveri (1969)
- Drengen og månen / The boy and the moon (1968)
- It don't mean a thing (1967)
- Generalen / The General (1966)
- Slambert / Scoundrel (1966)
- Elverskud (1966)
- Hvordan man opdrager sine forældre / How to bring up your parents (1966)
- Skorstensfejeren gik en tur (1965)
- Fagotten der fik ondt i maven (1965)
- Concerto erotica (1964)
- Agnete og Havmanden (1964)
