= The Stressful Adventures of Boxhead and Roundhead =

2014 animated film

- Directed by: Elliot Cowan
- Screenplay by: Elliot Cowan
- Produced by: Elliot Cowan
- Music by: Matt Saxton
- Release date: 2014
- Running time: 72 minutes
- Countries: United States; Romania
- Language: English

The Stressful Adventures of Boxhead and Roundhead is a 2014 American-Romanian computer-animated independent film written, produced and directed by Elliot Cowan in his directorial debut. Based on Cowan's titular characters, Boxhead and Roundhead were initially conceived as part of a children's picture book project, but were later adapted into a series of nine short films. The Stressful Adventures of Boxhead and Roundhead had its world premiere at the Melbourne International Animation Festival on 20 June 2014.

== Production ==
The characters of Boxhead and Roundhead were created by Elliot Cowan as part of a children's picture book project. Cowan envisioned Boxhead and Roundhead as stoic companions who endure dreadfulness, continuing to love each other in a world that hates them. When the book failed to be picked up by a publisher, Cowan developed the characters into a series of nine short films. He then saw a feature film as the next logical step for the characters.

Companies in Australia and Canada initially expressed interest in the project, however nothing ultimately came from it. A small amount of funding was then allocated to the project by the Romanian Film Office. Cowan created the characters in AfterEffects, with the rest of the animation done in Adobe Flash. Minor characters were animated by Lyla Ribot and several of Cowan's animation students. Cowan was also received assistance from Neil Ross.

== Release ==
The Stressful Adventures of Boxhead and Roundhead had its world premiere at the Melbourne International Animation Festival on 20 June 2014. After its premiere, Cowan endured several months of rejections from distributors. Cowan stated "It's too rough around the edges for that, so it becomes about, 'Who is going to love my ugly baby? Won’t someone love my ugly baby as I love it?'" However, after being screen at film festivals throughout April 2015, the reception became more positive.
