= Evliya Çelebi: The Fountain of Youth =

- Directed by: Serkan Zelzele
- Produced by: Cengiz Özdemir
- Music by: Rahman Altın
- Production companies: Anibera; Smit&Jansen; Epics Fx Studios
- Release date: November 14, 2014
- Running time: 82 minutes
- Country: Turkey
- Language: Turkish

Evliya Çelebi: The Fountain of Youth (Tr: Evliya Çelebi ve Ölümsüzlük Suyu) is a Turkish animated adventure-comedy film directed by Serkan Zelzele. The film went on nationwide general release on November 14, 2014.
