= Mikkel Lomborg =

Danish children's television presenter (born 1971)

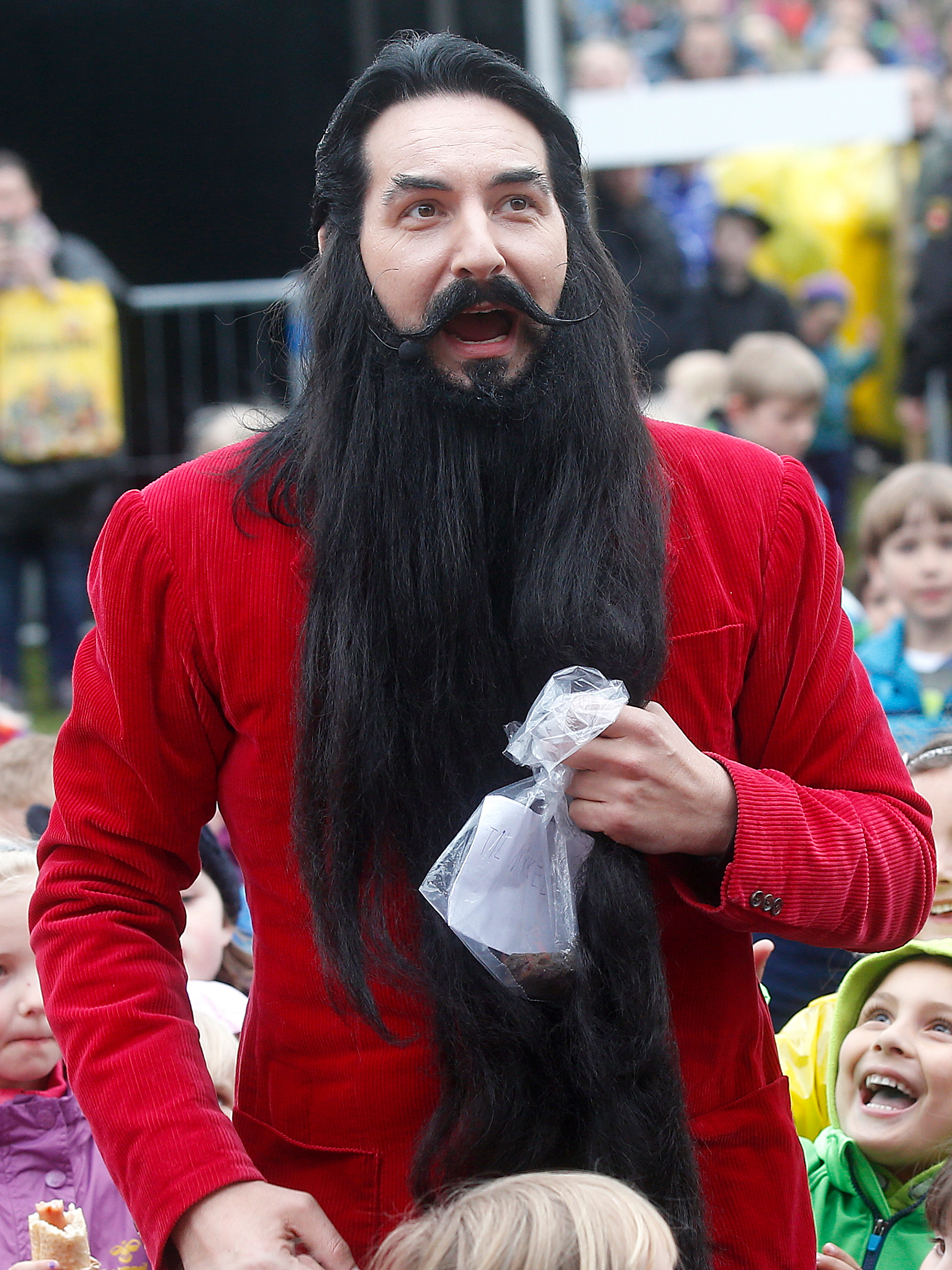
- Hr. Skæg at Legoland in 2015
- Born: 2 February 1971 (age 55); Vanløse, Denmark
- Occupations: Actor; educator; musician
- Years active: 2007–present
- Spouse: Neeni Lomborg Rasool (m. 2013)

Mikkel Lomborg (born 2 February 1971) is a Danish musician, educator, and actor known for his role of Hr. Skæg (lit. 'Mr. Beard') on DR Ramasjang since 2007.

== Early life ==
Born in Vanløse in 1971, Lomborg and his family moved to Lyngby soon after his birth. Lomborg grew up in the countryside of Stevns Municipality near Karise. His parents were divorced and his mother frequently moved, which led him to changing schools often during his youth along with his younger sister. In total, he stated he had lived in 14 different homes while growing up, which he attributed to difficult in forming friendships with other children his age. In his youth, he wanted to become a zoologist though he later instead chose to focus on music, becoming an opera singer.

As an adult, Lomborg worked at a social-psychiatric residential facility for vulnerable youth in Copenhagen, a position which he held for 11 years. He has attributed his ability to help children as an effect of growing up without a father and helping raise his younger sister.

== Career ==
In 2007, Lomborg was invited to that year's Zulu Awards, where he met several people including DR producer Palle Nørmark. He later received a casting call via Myspace message for the role of Hr. Skæg. He had previously in a children's program about beards on DR. The role was to host a show which itself was a spinoff of a Swedish television program, which taught children about numbers. After receiving the role, Skæg med matematik (lit. 'Beard with Mathematics') became a hit within Denmark.

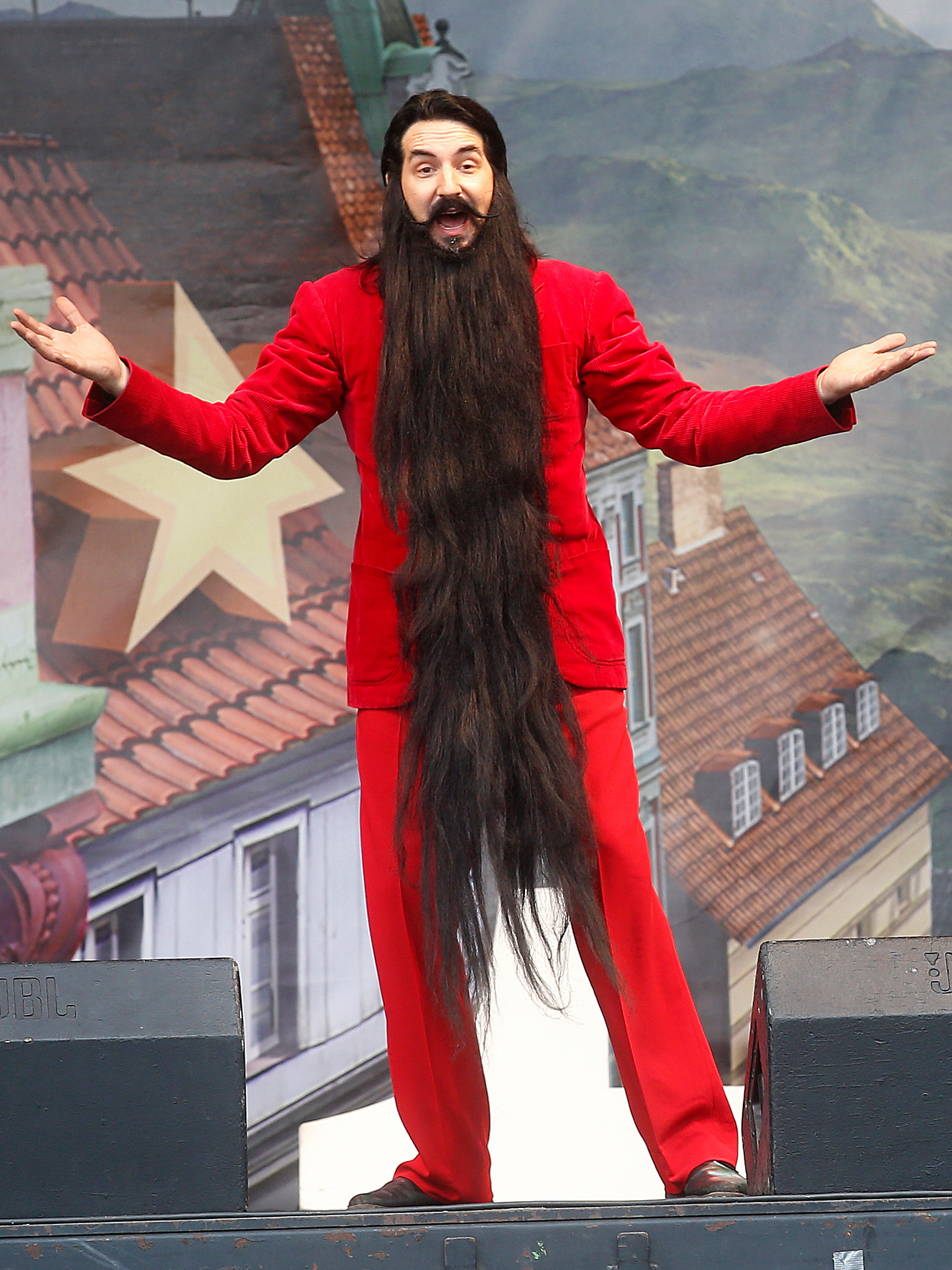
Hr. Skæg with his traditional beard

By 2010, Lomborg as Hr. Skæg began touring shopping centers, where he had printed more than 10,000 autograph cards to keep up with demand from children and parents. He began working at Cirkus Summarum in Ballerup in 2010, leading shows during the summer months while children were not in school. He later began hosting at the second location in Aarhus. A second show, Skæg med bogstaver (lit. 'Beard with Letters'), launched on DR in the fall of 2010. For his work, Lomborg received his second-consecutive award as Best Child Cultural Personality in 2015.

Since 2014, Lomborg has voiced the lead character in the Danish dub of the Paddington film series. He made his on-screen film debut in 2017, appearing as Hr. Skæg in the film Sikke et cirkus.

== Personal life ==
Lomborg met Neeni Lomborg Rasool in 2010. Before the two married in 2013, Lomborg converted to Islam. The two have one daughter together, and one other from a past relationship of Rasool. As of 2020, the couple live in Hellerup while Lomborg maintains an apartment in Nørrebro that he has owned since 1998.

Lomborg has stated his idol growing up was children's TV host Povl Kjøller.

== Filmography ==
Year	Title	Role	Notes
2014	Paddington	Paddington Bear	voice actor (Danish)
2017	Sikke et cirkus	Hr. Skæg	on-screen film debut
2017	Paddington 2	Paddington Bear	voice actor (Danish)
2025	Paddington in Peru	Paddington Bear	voice actor (Danish)
