= Copenhagen Bombay =

Defunct danish animation Studio (2006-2023)

- Industry: Entertainment
- Founded: 2006
- Defunct: 2023
- Headquarters: Copenhagen, Denmark
- Key people: Sarita Christensen (CEO)
- Products: Motion pictures, television programs
- Website: copenhagenbombay.com

Copenhagen Bombay was a Danish production company, animation studio and distribution company, specializing in entertainment for children and teenagers. It produced films, television, books, games, online universes and other media. The company went bankrupt in 2023.

== History ==
The company was founded in 2006 by director Anders Morgenthaler and producer Sarita Christensen. Christensen came from a position in Zentropa where she had produced Morgenthaler's film Princess.

== Notable productions ==
Esben Toft Jacobsen's animated feature The Great Bear was selected for the Generation Kplus programme at the 2011 Berlin International Film Festival, where it attracted considerable international attention and was sold to a wide range of countries. The documentary The Testament won a Bodil Award for Best Danish Documentary at the 65th Bodil Awards.

== Filmography ==
=== Production ===
- Vesterbro (2007)
- Eat Shit and Die (2008)
- Carsten & Gittes filmballade (2008)
- De vilde hjerter (2008)
- Æblet & ormen (2009)
- Fup & Svindel (2009)
- Hvad vil du vide? (2010)
- Tigre og tatoveringer (2010)
- Hjemve (2011)
- Pandaerne (2011)
- The Great Bear (2011)
- Restaurangutang (2011)
- Testamentet (2011)
- Beyond Beyond (2014)
- Nabospionen (2017)

=== TV Series ===
- Kiwi & Strit (2015)
- Børste (2021)

=== Animation Services ===
- Angry Birds Toons (2013)

== Distribution ==
- Æblet & ormen (2009)
- Tigre og tatoveringer (2010)
