= Trio con Brio Copenhagen =

Danish chamber music group

- Origin: Copenhagen, Denmark
- Genres: Chamber music piano trio
- Years active: 1999–present
- Members: Jens Elvekjaer (piano); Soo-Jin Hong (violin); Soo-Kyung Hong (cello)
- Website: Official website

Trio con Brio Copenhagen is a piano trio based in Copenhagen, Denmark. It was formed in 1999 and consists of the Danish pianist Jens Elvekjaer and the two South Korean sisters Soo-Jin Hong and Soo-Kyung Hong.

Soo-Jin Hong and Soo-Kyung Hong play an Andrea Guarneri violin and an Amati cello, respectively, and Jens Elvekjaer is the first Danish Steinway Artist.

== Biography ==
The trio was founded by its three members in Vienna in 1999. Its name refers to the composer's instruction allegro con brio "lively with spirit". Sisters Soo-Jin and Soo-Kyung Hong were born in South Korea and had performed together since childhood. They met Elvekjaer while he was studying in Vienna. Soo-Kyung later married Elvekjaer. The trio had its breakthrough when it won 1st place (ex-aequo) in the piano trio category at the prestigious German ARD International Music Competition in 2002.

Subsequently Trio con Brio settled in Copenhagen and In 2003 it performed the complete Beethoven piano trio cycle in three concerts at Tivoli Concert Hall in Copenhagen to much critical acclaim. In 2005 Trio con Brio became Ensemble in Residence at Copenhagen's historic Round Tower. These concerts were broadcast on the European Broadcasting Union and the national Danish broadcaster DR.

Parallel to these engagements, Trio con Brio continued to win awards at competitions and festivals around the world, culminating with the highly prestigious Kalichstein-Laredo-Robinson International Trio Award in 2005. This gave them concert engagements in twenty major concert series across the USA as well as a record deal. Since then the trio has performed at numerous music venues around the world.

In 2019, the trio stated they had stopped entering competitions because they "had won all the major competitions" and they wanted to "take off in 'the real world' " which they say they haven't regretted.

== Concert activities ==
Trio con Brio Copenhagen tours worldwide, giving concerts in major concert halls and at festivals in Europe, North America and Asia. These include New York’s Carnegie Hall and Lincoln center, London's Wigmore Hall and Amsterdam’s Royal Concertgebouw.

In Copenhagen the trio gives regular concerts at venues such as the Queen's Hall of the Black Diamond.

Trio con Brio Copenhagen is frequently featured as soloists in Beethoven’s Triple Concerto with orchestras such as the Danish National Symphony Orchestra, the Copenhagen Philharmonic, the Polish Chamber Philharmonic Orchestra, l’Orchestre Syrinx (France), and the Prime Philharmonic Orchestra (Korea).

== Discography ==
- Dvorak, Ravel and Bloch – Piano Trios, Azica 2007
- Mendelssohn – Piano Trios, Marquis Classics 2009
- Beethoven – Triple and Piano Concerto, CD Klassisk 2013
- Phantasmagoria – Danish Piano Trios, Dacapo Records 2013
- Tchaikovsky and Smetana – Piano Trios, Orchid Classics 2015
- Beethoven – Piano Trios Volume I, Orchid Classics 2018
- Beethoven – Piano Trios Volume II, Orchid Classics 2018
- Beethoven – Piano Trios Volume III, Orchid Classics 2019
- Shostakovich and Arensky – Piano Trios, Orchid Classics 2021
- Bent Sørensen – The Island in the City, Dacapo Records 2022
- The Passenger – Piano Trios by Weinberg and Schubert, Orchid Classics 2024
- Harmonie du soir – piano trios by Ravel and Schubert, Orchid Classics 2025

== Critics ==
In their review of the trio's debut CD , the American Record Guide wrote: “One of the greatest performances of chamber music I’ve ever encountered [...] What stands out from this ensemble is the range of tone and sound [...] They command an amazing range of timbres. Melodies sing with an aching sweetness, or seduce with wild eroticism, or haunt with impenetrable mystery"

Gramophone wrote that "it’s easy to see what so impressed the judges [...] [the] performances can compete with the best available [...] a superb, greatly gifted chamber group".

== Awards ==
- 2nd Prize, Vienna Haydn Competition. Austria
- 2002 Danish Radio Chamber Music Competition. Denmark
- 2002 ARD International Music Competition
- 2002 Premio Trio di Trieste. Italy
- 2003 Premio Vittorio Gui, Italy
- 2003 Trondheim Chamber Music Competition . Norway
- "Allianz-Preis" for Best Ensemble at the Festspiele Mecklenburg-Vorpommern. Germany
- 2005 Kalichstein-Laredo-Robinson International Trio Award
- 2019 Carl Nielsen and Anne Marie Carl-Nielsen Award
- 2022 German Record Critics’ Award Quarterly Critic’s Choice
- Minor planet 6623 Trioconbrio is named after the band.
