= Mini and the Mozzies =

2014 animated film

- Theatrical release poster
- Danish: Cykelmyggen og Minibillen
- Directed by: Flemming Quist Møller; Jannik Hastrup
- Screenplay by: Flemming Quist Møller
- Produced by: Marie Bro
- Music by: Jesper Mechlenburg
- Production company: Dansk Tegnefilm
- Distributed by: Nordisk Film Distribution
- Release date: 12 June 2014
- Running time: 76 minutes
- Country: Denmark
- Language: Danish

Mini and the Mozzies (Danish: Cykelmyggen og Minibillen) is a 2014 Danish animated children's film directed by Flemming Quist Møller and Jannik Hastrup from a screenplay by Møller, based on the eponymous series of children's books by Møller. Produced by Dansk Tegnefilm, Mini and the Mozzies was released in Danish theatres on 12 June 2014 by Nordisk Film Distribution.
