= Trille =

Danish singer and feminist

Trille Bodil Nielsen, also Gudrun Bodil Nielsen, (1945–2016) was a Danish singer, guitarist and women's rights activist. In the 1960s, she began to sing mainly traditional folk songs and children's songs. After singing Jesper Jensen's controversial song "Øjet" (The Eye) on the TV programme Musikalske venner (Musical Friends) in 1970, she gained immediate popularity. A few years later, her album Hej søster (Hi Sister) with her own songs about the problems faced by women saw the beginning of a successful career as both a songwriter and a singer. She suddenly completely retired from the limelight in 1988, thereafter concentrating on her humanitarian and cultural interests. In particular, she produced programmes for children on Danish television.

== Early life ==
Born on 6 March 1945 in Copenhagen, Gudrun Bodil Nielsen was the third child of the dental technician Niels Otto Nielsen (1913–1952) and Ragnhild Eleonore Kirstine Hansen (1912–1992), a secretary. After her father died of kidney problems when she was seven, she was brought up by her mother on the island of Amager, together with her two older brothers. Her singing career began at the Copenhagen restaurant Kontoret while she was still a high school pupil at Christianshavns Gymnasium. Shortly before she matriculated from school in 1964, she was introduced to the song writer Thøger Olesen (1923–1977) who engaged her as a singer at Tivoli's newly opened Vise-Vers-Hus. In 1965, when she was 19, she met the 16-year-older artist Carl Henrik Jensen on the island of Fanø. They married, had a daughter, Sille, but divorced seven years later.

== Career ==
In the 1960s, she collaborated with various singers and songwriters, including Georges Marinos, Frode Veddinge, Jens August Schade and Cornelis Vreeswijk. After her daughter Sille was born in 1964, she included children's songs among her folksongs. Now part of the Copenhagen folk scene of the 1970s, inspired by the Canadian folk singer Joni Mitchell she developed her own style and wrote her own songs.

Trille gained immediate success throughout Denmark as both a singer and a feminist on 18 September 1970 after appearing for three minutes on the TV show Musikalske venner where she sang Jesper Jensen's controversial song "Øjet". Causing something of a national scandal, it tells of how God looked down on forbidden erotic feelings although he knew nothing about sex as he never had any himself. It led to one of Denmark's few court cases relating to blasphemy although both she and Danmarks Radio were freed of any crime a year later as the judge could see nothing provocative in the song.

Her 1976 album Hej Søster which expressed her feelings as a mother and a woman reflected the goals of the women's movement, confirming her as a spokesman for their cause. In an interview in 2004, however, she denied any role in the movement: "I have never been a member of a social group or a political party. I didn't even participate in the Red Stocking Movement because at the time I was living together with my daughter's father. As I was active in community affairs, something may perhaps have been expected of me. But they associated me with everything the women's movement did and believed, and however much I screamed and yelled, it didn't help a bit."

Albums such as En Lille Bunke Krummer (A Little Heap of Crumbs, 1978) and Altid Har Jeg Længsel (I Always Keep On Longing, 1979) served as inspiration for the singers Anne Linnet and Anne Dorte Michelsen. After she had released her last album Hjemlige eventyr (Secret Adventure) in 1988, she suffered from a deep depression which drove her to give up singing once and for all. She returned to Danmarks Radio's children's department where she had played a pioneering role with children's programmes in the 1970s. She produced TV series for children and documentaries about children in the Third World. On the occasion of her 70th birthday in 2015, she published her memoirs: Altid har jeg længsel: Erindringer.

After suffering from cancer for a short period, Trille died at her home in Præstø on 17 October 2016, aged 71. In 1980, she had officially changed her name to Trille Bodil Nielsen.

== Selected discography ==
In addition to recordings with other artists, Trille has released the following albums:

- 1968: Trille + Frode Veddinge - Viser For Folk Og.., LP, Octav (2), OL 8026
- 1970: Trille – Oh Nelson Med Dit Øje, LP, Columbia, E 054-38006
- 1971: Trille – Fra Engeland Til Skotland, LP, Mascot Records (4), MALP 12
- 1971: Trille – Goda' - Goda', LP, Columbia, 6E 062 38060
- 1972: Trille – Dit & Dat Og Andre Børnesange, LP, Metronome, HLP 10557
- 1975: Trille – Trille Synger Og Fortæller Om Ejgil, 2 LPs, Metronome, MELP 605
- 1976: Trille – Viser Fra Din Oldefars Tid, LP, Abra Cadabra Production, ABC 104
- 1976: Trille – Hej Søster, LP, Exlibris, EXL 20005
- 1977: Trille – Trille Synger Sørens Sange, LP, Abra Cadabra Productions, ABC 108
- 1978: Trille – En Lille Bunke Krummer, LP, Exlibris, EXL 30003
- 1979: Trille – Altid Har Jeg Længsel, LP, Exlibris, EXL 30 008
- 1981: Trille – Små Skridt, LP, Exlibris, EXL 30 011
- 1983: Trille – Halvmånetid, LP, Harlekin, HMLP 4317
- 1986: Trille – Indeni / Udenpå, LP, Exlibris, EXL 30 027
- 1988: Trille – Hjemlige Eventyr, LP, Exlibris, EXL 30035
- 2010: Trille – Hele Balladen, 7 CDs, Reissue, Exlibris, EXLCD 30137
