= Steingrimur Rohloff =

Icelandic-German composer (born 1971)

Steingrímur Rohloff
- Born: 1971 (age 54–55); Reykjavík, Iceland
- Occupation: Composer

Steingrímur Rohloff (born 1971) is an Icelandic-German composer.

== Early life ==
Rohloff was born in Reykjavík, Iceland in 1971, to an Icelandic mother and a German father. Rohloff studied composition with Krzysztof Meyer at the Hochschule für Musik und Tanz Köln. Supported by DAAD he went to the Conservatoire national superieur de Paris to study composition with Gérard Grisey and Marco Stroppa, electronic music with Laurent Cuniot and Louis Naon and orchestration with Marc-André Dalbavie. In 1999 he got selected for a course at the IRCAM in Paris. In 2001-2003 he studied electronic music with Hans-Ulrich Humpert.

== Career ==
Steingrimur Rohloff has received numerous prizes for his compositions. His orchestral works Sol, Gravitation and the Saxophone Concerto were first performed in Gothenburg, Saarbrücken and Oslo and received a lot of attention, when he was awarded the Bernd-Alois-Zimmermann-Prize of the City of Cologne in Germany in 2003. This prize was mainly given to him because of those large orchestral pieces, which the jury called "of an original fantasy... a virtuoso technique in the treatment of the orchestra...melodic invention...exciting colour-developments..." Latest orchestral works include the Concerto Grosso (2022), Doppelgängerkonzert (2023) War Requiem (2023), Horn Concerto (2024) for Stefan Dohr and a Piano Concerto (2024) for Marianna Shirinyan.

His works have been performed in more than 25 countries worldwide.

== External links and sources ==
https://edition-s.dk/composers/steingrimur-rohloff
