= Fuzzy (composer) =

Danish composer and musician (1939–2022)

Jens Vilhelm Pedersen, also known as Fuzzy, (23 February 1939 – 13 October 2022) was a Danish composer and musician. A student of Per Nørgård, Karlheinz Stockhausen, György Ligeti, and Jan Bark, he taught music history and theory at the Royal Academy of Music in Aarhus until 1978.

His music spanned a wide range of genres from jazz, over film music, to experimental electronic music.

In 1972, he composed the music for the Rainer Werner Fassbinder TV series Eight Hours Don't Make a Day under the pseudonym Jean Gepoint.

Fuzzy died on 13 October 2022, at the age of 83.
