= List of animated television series of 2014 =

This is a list of animated television series first aired in 2014.

Animated television series first aired in 2014
Title	Seasons	Episodes	Country	Year	Original channel	Technique
The 7D	2	44	United States	2014–16	Disney XD	Traditional
Adit Sopo Jarwo	2+	200+	Indonesia	2014–present	MNCTV; Global TV; Trans TV; RTV; MDTV	CGI
Albert & Junior		23	Canada	2014	BabyFirstTV	Flash
Alien Family Jolly Polly	1	26	South Korea	2014–15	KBS2	Flash
Alien Monkeys	1	52	South Korea	2014	SBS TV	CGI
Alien Pig Pipi	1	24	South Korea	2014	KBS1	CGI
All Hail King Julien	6	78	United States	2014–17	Netflix	CGI
Alphabet Stories	1	26	Canada	2014	TVOKids	Flash
Al-Rawi	1	30	Egypt	2014		CGI
The Amazing Awang Khenit	2	38	Malaysia	2014–19	TV9 (season 1); TV3 (season 2)	Traditional
Amy's Mythic Mornings	1	8	Canada	2014	APTN	CGI/Flash
Angry Birds Stella	2	26	Finland	2014–16	Toons.TV	CGI
Angry Little Asian Girl	1	12	United States	2014	Mnet	Flash
Anipong	1	10	South Korea	2014	KBS1	CGI/Flash
Annedroids	4	52	Canada	2014–17	Amazon Prime Video; TVOKids	CGI/Live action
Arjun – Prince of Bali	3	95	India	2014–16	Disney Channel	Flash
Astar-eul Hyanghae Chaguchagu	1	27	South Korea	2014–15	KBS1	Traditional
Astroblast!	2	52	United States	2014–15	Sprout	Flash
Automatic Study Desk Wiki	2	1100	South Korea	2014–21	KBS2	CGI/Live action
Bee and PuppyCat	2	26	United States; Japan (2022)	2014–22	YouTube; Nintendo Video; Netflix (2022)	Traditional
Biklonz	5	111	South Korea	2014–16	SBS	CGI
Bing	2	104	United Kingdom	2014–19	CBeebies	CGI
Blaze and the Monster Machines	9	180	United States; Canada	2014–25	Nickelodeon	CGI
Bobo Dormouse	2	52	Germany	2014–20	KiKa	Flash
Bodhi and Friends	4	156	China	2014	CCTV-14	CGI
Boj	1	50	United Kingdom; Ireland	2014–15	CBeebies; RTÉjr; S4C (Wales)	Flash
BoJack Horseman	6	77	United States	2014–20	Netflix	Flash
Booba	5	130	Russia; United Kingdom	2014–present	YouTube	CGI
Boris en Binti		52	Belgium	2014	Ketnet	Flash
Boyster	1	52	France; United Kingdom	2014–17	Disney XD; France 4	Flash
Breadwinners	2	40	United States	2014–16	Nickelodeon (2014–15); Nicktoons (2016)	Flash/Traditional
Brichos	1	13	Brazil	2014–16	TV Brasil	Flash
Bubble Bip	2	52	Spain	2014–?	Super3	CGI
Bubble Bubble Marin	1	52	South Korea	2014	EBS	CGI
Bugsted	1	13	Spain; Mexico	2014	Disney XD	CGI
Buzz Bumble	1	52	Australia	2014	GO!	Flash
Calimero (2014)	2	104	France; Italy; Japan	2014–16	TF1; Rai 2 Rai Yoyo; TV Tokyo	CGI
Ceratops Koriyo	1	13	South Korea	2014	KBS2	CGI
Chop Chop Ninja Challenge	1	40	Canada	2014–15	Teletoon	Flash
Chozen	1	13	United States	2014	FX	Flash
Clarence	3	130	United States	2014–18	Cartoon Network	Traditional
Counting with Paula	7	384	Singapore; Portugal	2014–23/24	Okto; RTPNinhos; RTP2	CGI
The Cyanide & Happiness Show	4	41	United States	2014–19	YouTube; Seeso; VRV	Flash
DaDuDiDo	5	30	Malaysia	2014–present	YouTube	CGI
Deutsches Fleisch	1	8	Germany	2014	ZDFneo	
Dimitri	2	51	France; Switzerland	2014	France 5	Stop motion
Dinopaws		52	Canada; United Kingdom	2014–17	CBeebies; Treehouse TV	CGI
Dora and Friends: Into the City!	2	40	United States	2014–17	Nickelodeon	Traditional
Dr. Dimensionpants	2	26	Canada	2014–15	Teletoon	Flash
Earth to Luna!	8	208	Brazil; United States (seasons 1–2, 8)	2014–23	Discovery Kids (Latin America); Sprout (seasons 1–2); Kids Street (seasons 3–8)	Flash
Ein Fall für TKKG	1	26	Germany	2014–16	KiKa	Traditional
Eungkka Sonata	2	52	South Korea	2014–17	MBC	Flash
Fantasy Westward Journey	4	52	China	2014–16	iQIYI; Tencent Video; Youku; Mango TV	CGI
The Flamin' Thongs	1	26	Australia	2014	ABC3	CGI
Flower Fairy	6		China	2014–22		Flash
G-Fighters	1	26	South Korea	2014–15	EBS	CGI
Game of Zones	7	39	United States	2014–20	YouTube	Flash
Gaturro: The Series	1	20	Argentina	2014	Cartoon Network	CGI
Gemini 8			Brazil	2014	Disney Channel; Disney Junior	
Gentlemen Lobsters	3	21	United States	2014–16	GQ.com; Seeso	
Get Ace	1	52	Australia	2014	Eleven	Flash
Grami's Circus Show	2	20	South Korea	2014–16	KBS1	CGI
Guardians Evolution	3	17	Canada	2014–18	APTN	Stop motion
Hanging On!	2	46	South Korea	2014–15	KBS2	Traditional
Hello Carbot			South Korea	2014–present	KBS1; SBS TV	CGI
Heroes – 5 Helden, keine Meinung	1	3	Germany	2014	Tele 5	
Hey Duggee	5	216	United Kingdom	2014–present	CBeebies	Flash
Höggschde Konzentration	2	38	Germany	2014–16	Tele 5	
Inspector Mergou	2	60	Algeria	2014–15	Echorouk TV	CGI
Invizimals	1	26	Spain	2014–15	Super3	CGI
Jamie's Got Tentacles!	3	157	France	2014–present	France 3	Flash
Jarau	1	12	Brazil	2014	TV Brasil	CGI
Jorel's Brother	5	127	Brazil	2014–25	Cartoon Network	Flash
Kagagi	1	13	Canada	2014	APTN	CGI
Kate & Mim-Mim	2	49	Canada; United Kingdom	2014–18	Knowledge Network; BBC Kids; CBeebies	CGI
Kids & Flying Animals		58	Russia	2014–19	YouTube	Flash
Kiko (pre-season)	1	39	Indonesia	2014	RCTI	CGI
King Star King	1	6	United States	2014	Adult Swim	Flash/Traditional
Kirby Buckets	3	59	United States	2014–17	Disney XD	Flash/Live action
Kisna			India	2014	Discovery Kids	
Kit ^n^ Kate	2	104	Ireland; Russia; Cyprus	2014–19	Carousel	Flash
The KneeBouncers Show		20	United States	2014	BabyFirstTV	Flash
Knietzsche – The World's Smallest Philosopher	8	64	Germany	2014–22	WDR	Flash
Kongsuni and Friends	9	87	South Korea	2014–24	JEI Talent TV; Animax; KBS1; KBS2	CGI
Kuku Rock You			Indonesia	2014–present	Indosiar	CGI
Lassie	2	52	France; India (season 1); Germany	2014–20	TF1; Télétoon+ ZDF; KiKa	Traditional (season 1); CGI (season 2)
Lennart im Grummeltal	1	26	Germany	2014	KiKa	
Lily's Driftwood Bay	2	100	United Kingdom	2014–17	Nick Jr.	Flash
Linkers: Secret Codes	1	26	France	2014	Canal J	CGI
LoliRock	2	52	France	2014–17	France 3	Toon Boom/Flash/Traditional
Louis Says	3	26	Canada	2014–18	APTN	Flash
Magic Scientists Club	1	26	South Korea	2014–15	MBC TV	
Marcus Level	1	52	France	2014	TF1	Flash
Mike Tyson Mysteries	4	70	United States	2014–20	Adult Swim	Traditional
Mind Blowing Breakthroughs	3	78	Argentina; South Korea	2014–present	Astro TVIQ; Da Vinci Kids; Kids Central	Flash
Miniforce	6	46	South Korea	2014–present	EBS	CGI
Miracle Star	1	12	China	2014		Flash
Misha the Purple Cat	3	78	France; Spain	2014–18	Super3	Flash
Mixels	2	26	United States	2014–16	Cartoon Network	Toon Boom/Traditional/Flash
Mr. Pickles	4	32	United States	2014–19	Adult Swim	Flash
My Friend Ttobo	2		South Korea	2014–16	EBS; MBC TV	
Nanocore	3		China	2014–17	Tencent Video; Youku	CGI
Nerds and Monsters	2	40	Canada	2014–16	YTV	Flash
Niloya	8	197	Turkey	2014–24	Yumurcak TV (2014–16); TRT Çocuk (2016–24)	CGI
Nina Needs to Go!	1	20	United States; United Kingdom	2014–17	Disney Junior	Flash
Ninja Nontu			India	2014	Cartoon Network	
Numb Chucks	2	52	Canada	2014–16	YTV	Flash
Ookii's World		15	United States	2014	BabyFirstTV	Flash
Orfani	1	10	Italy	2014	Rai 4	
Over the Garden Wall	1	10	United States	2014	Cartoon Network	Traditional
The Owl & Co	2	156	France	2014	France 3	CGI
Paopao in the Baobab Islands	1	52	South Korea	2014	EBS	CGI
Pape Popo	1	24	South Korea	2014	SBS TV	Traditional
Pasila 2.5: the Spin-off	4	40	Finland	2014–16	Yle TV2	Flash
Peanuts	1	37	France; Italy; United States	2014–16	France 3 Cartoon Network; Boomerang	Flash
Peet the Forest Detective	4	78	South Korea	2014–present	EBS1	CGI/Live action
Pelezinho em Planeta Futebol	1	13	Brazil	2014	Discovery Kids	Flash
Penn Zero: Part-Time Hero	2	35	United States	2014–17	Disney XD	Flash
Petz Club	1	52	France; Monaco	2014	France 5	Flash
Pie Rojo	1	26	Mexico	2014	Canal Once	CGI/Live action
Piggy Tales	4	121	Finland	2014–19	Toons.TV	Stop motion (seasons 1–2); CGI (seasons 3–4)
Pip Ahoy!	3	79	United Kingdom	2014–18	Milkshake!	Flash
Plum Landing			United States	2014	PBS Kids	Flash
Polo	2	104	France; Luxembourg	2014–17	KiKa; Piwi+	Flash
A Portrait of Jianghu: Bad Guys	6	171	China	2014–present	iQIYI; Sohu; LeTV; Tencent Video	CGI
Puteri	1	6	Malaysia	2014	TV3	CGI
Rafadan Tayfa	10	127	Turkey	2014–present	TRT Çocuk	CGI
Rainbow Brite	1	3	United States	2014	Feeln	Flash
Raketenflieger Timmi	3	33	Germany	2014–21	KiKa	CGI
Rimba Racer	2	26	Malaysia	2014–19	Nickelodeon	CGI
Rocka-Bye Island	1	26	Ireland	2014	RTÉjr	Flash
Ruff Ruffman: Humble Media Genius	2	21	United States	2014–24	PBSKids.org; YouTube	Flash (season 1); Toon Boom (season 2)
Sammy & Co	2	104	France	2014–17	M6	CGI
Sheriff Callie's Wild West	2	45	United States	2014–17	Disney Junior	CGI
Shopkins	1	85	Australia	2014–18	YouTube	Flash
The Skinner Boys: Guardians of the Lost Secrets	2	52	Australia	2014–17	GO!	Flash
Sonic Boom	2	104	United States; France	2014–17	Cartoon Network; Boomerang; Canal J Gulli	CGI
Space Jungle	2	78	South Korea	2014–16	EBS1	CGI/Live action
Space Racers	2	90	United States	2014–18	PBS Kids (season 1); Universal Kids (season 2)	CGI
Spookiz	2	74	South Korea	2014–16		CGI
Star Wars Rebels	4	75	United States	2014–18	Disney XD	CGI
Stone Quackers	1	12	United States	2014–15	FXX	Flash
Street Football Extreme	1	39	France; Italy	2014–15	France 3	CGI
Super 4	2	104	France	2014–17	France 3	CGI
Super Wings	10	382	South Korea; China; United States	2014–present	EBS1	CGI
Talking Tom & Friends	5	156	Slovenia; Austria; Spain; United States	2014–21	YouTube	CGI
Talking Tom Shorts	3	101	United States	2014–present	YouTube	CGI
Tashi	1	52	Australia; Ireland	2014–15	7TWO	CGI
This One 'N That One	1	10	United States	2014	AFN Family	Flash
Tip the Mouse	3	104	Germany; Italy	2014–19	Rai Yoyo; Super RTL	CGI
The Tom and Jerry Show	5	118	United States	2014–21	Cartoon Network (seasons 1–2); Boomerang (seasons 2–5); Cartoon Network App (season 5)	Flash
Toot the Tiny Tugboat	1	52	United Kingdom	2014–15	Milkshake!	Flash
Les Triplés	1	78	France; Luxembourg	2014–15	France 5	CGI
TripTank	2	28	United States	2014–16	Comedy Central	Flash
Trucktown	1	40	Canada	2014–18	Treehouse TV	CGI
Trudes Tier	3	32	Germany	2014–22	Das Erste; KiKa	CGI
Tumble Leaf	4	52	United States	2014–19	Amazon Prime Video	Stop motion
VeggieTales in the House	4	52	United States	2014–16	Netflix	CGI
Wallykazam!	2	52	United States	2014–17	Nick Jr.	CGI
Wanda and the Alien	1	52	United Kingdom	2014–15	Milkshake!	Flash
Warren United	1	6	United Kingdom	2014	ITV4	Flash
Where's Chicky?	4	208	France	2014–25	Canal J	CGI
Wildernuts			Ireland	2014	RTÉjr	Flash
Wonder Balls	2	52	South Korea	2014–19	EBS	CGI
World Peacekeepers	1	52	China	2014		Traditional
WWE Slam City	1	26	United States	2014	WWE Network	Stop motion
X-Heart	1	26	Brazil	2014	Disney XD	Flash
Zack & Quack	3	43	France; Israel; United Kingdom; South Korea	2014–17	Nick Jr.	CGI
Zica and the Chameleons	2	26	Brazil	2014–17	TV Brasil	Flash

Anime television series first aired in 2014
Title	Episodes	Country	Year	Original channel	Technique
Ai Tenchi Muyo!	50	Japan	2014	Tokyo MX	Traditional
Ai-Mai-Mi: Mousou Catastrophe	12	Japan	2014	AT-X	Traditional
Akame ga Kill!	24	Japan	2014	Tokyo MX	Traditional
Aldnoah.Zero	12	Japan	2014	Tokyo MX, GYT, GTV, BS11	Traditional
Always! Super Radical Gag Family	24	Japan	2014	Tokyo MX, SUN	Traditional
Amagi Brilliant Park	13	Japan	2014	TBS	Traditional
Ao Haru Ride	12	Japan	2014	Tokyo MX, MBS	Traditional
Argevollen	24	Japan	2014	Tokyo MX	Traditional
Atelier Escha & Logy: Alchemists of the Dusk Sky	12	Japan	2014	Tokyo MX	Traditional
Baby Steps	25	Japan	2014	NHK E	Traditional
Barakamon	12	Japan	2014	Nippon TV	Traditional
BeyWarriors: BeyRaiderz	13	Japan	2014	YTV	Traditional
BeyWarriors: Cyborg	26	Japan	2014–15	K2	Traditional
Black Bullet	13	Japan	2014	AT-X	Traditional
Black Butler: Book of Circus	10	Japan	2014	MBS	Traditional
Blade & Soul	13	Japan	2014	TBS	Traditional
Bladedance of Elementalers	12	Japan	2014	AT-X	Traditional
Broken Blade	12	Japan	2014	Tokyo MX	Traditional
Brynhildr in the Darkness	13	Japan	2014	Tokyo MX	Traditional
Buddy Complex	13	Japan	2014	Tokyo MX	Traditional
Captain Earth	25	Japan	2014	MBS, Tokyo MX	Traditional
Cardfight!! Vanguard G	48	Japan	2014–15		Traditional
Cardfight!! Vanguard: Legion Mate	33	Japan	2014		Traditional
Celestial Method	13	Japan	2014		Traditional
Chaika: The Coffin Princess	12	Japan	2014		Traditional
Chaika: The Coffin Princess: Avenging Battle	10	Japan	2014		Traditional
ColoColo Animal 2	63	Japan	2014–15		Flash
The Comic Artist and His Assistants	12	Japan	2014		Traditional
La Corda d'Oro Blue Sky	12	Japan	2014		Traditional
Cross Ange	25	Japan	2014–15		Traditional
D-Frag!	12	Japan	2014	TV Tokyo	Traditional
Dai-Shogun – Great Revolution	12	Japan	2014		Traditional
Daimidaler: Prince vs Penguin Empire	12	Japan	2014		Traditional
Date A Live II	10	Japan	2014		Traditional
Denkigai no Honya-san	12	Japan	2014		Traditional
Dragon Collection	51	Japan	2014–15		Traditional
Dragonar Academy	12	Japan	2014		Traditional
Dramatical Murder	12	Japan	2014		Traditional
Duel Masters Versus	49	Japan	2014–15	TXN	Traditional
Eagle Talon Extreme	38	Japan	2014–15		Flash
Encouragement of Climb: Second Season	24	Japan	2014		Traditional
Engaged to the Unidentified	12	Japan	2014	ABC, AT-X, Tokyo MX	Traditional
Fairy Tail Series 2	102	Japan	2014–16		Traditional
Fate/kaleid liner Prisma Illya 2wei	10	Japan	2014		Traditional
Fate/stay night: Unlimited Blade Works	12	Japan	2014		Traditional
Francesca	24	Japan	2014	UHB	
Free! - Eternal Summer	13	Japan	2014		Traditional
The Fruit of Grisaia	13	Japan	2014		Traditional
Future Card Buddyfight	64	Japan	2014–15		Traditional
Garo: The Animation	24	Japan	2014–15		Traditional
Gigant Big-Shot Tsukasa	32	Japan	2014–15	NHK E	
Girl Friend Beta	12	Japan	2014		Traditional
Glasslip	13	Japan	2014		Traditional
Go-Go Tamagotchi!	50	Japan	2014–15		Traditional
Go! Go! 575	4	Japan	2014		Traditional
Gonna be the Twin-Tail!!	12	Japan	2014		Traditional
A Good Librarian Like a Good Shepherd	12	Japan	2014		Traditional
Gudetama	1200+	Japan	2014–20		
Gugure! Kokkuri-san	12	Japan	2014		Traditional
Gundam Build Fighters Try	25	Japan	2014–15		Traditional
Gundam Reconguista in G	26	Japan	2014–15		Traditional
Haikyu!!	25	Japan	2014		Traditional
Hamatora: The Animation	12	Japan	2014		Traditional
Hanamonogatari	5	Japan	2014		Traditional
Hanayamata	12	Japan	2014		Traditional
HappinessCharge PreCure!	49	Japan	2014–15		Traditional
Hero Bank	51	Japan	2014–15		Traditional
Hi-sCoool! SeHa Girls	13	Japan	2014		CGI
Himegoto	13	Japan	2014		Traditional
Hozuki's Coolheadedness	13	Japan	2014		Traditional
I Can't Understand What My Husband Is Saying	13	Japan	2014		Traditional
If Her Flag Breaks	13	Japan	2014		Traditional
In Search of the Lost Future	12	Japan	2014		Traditional
Inari, Konkon, Koi Iroha	10	Japan	2014		Traditional
Initial D: Final Stage	4	Japan	2014		Traditional
Inugami-san to Nekoyama-san	12	Japan	2014		Traditional
Invaders of the Rokujouma!?	12	Japan	2014		Traditional
The Irregular at Magic High School	26	Japan	2014		Traditional
Is the Order a Rabbit?	12	Japan	2014		Traditional
Jinsei	13	Japan	2014		Traditional
JoJo's Bizarre Adventure: Stardust Crusaders	24	Japan	2014		Traditional
Kamigami no Asobi	12	Japan	2014		Traditional
The Kawai Complex Guide to Manors and Hostel Behavior	12	Japan	2014		Traditional
Keroro	23	Japan	2014	Animax	Flash
The Kindaichi Case Files R	25	Japan	2014		Traditional
Knights of Sidonia	12	Japan	2014		CGI
Lady Jewelpet	52	Japan	2014–15		Traditional
Laughing Under the Clouds	12	Japan	2014		Traditional
Locodol	12	Japan	2014		Traditional
Log Horizon 2	25	Japan	2014–15	NHK E	Traditional
Lord Marksman and Vanadis	13	Japan	2014		Traditional
Love, Chunibyo & Other Delusions: Heart Throb	12	Japan	2014		Traditional
Love Live! School Idol Project 2	13	Japan	2014		Traditional
Love Stage!!	10	Japan	2014		Traditional
Lovely Movie: Lovely Muuuuuuuco! Season 2	22	Japan	2014		
M3: The Dark Metal	24	Japan	2014		Traditional
Magic Kaito 1412	24	Japan	2014–15		Traditional
Magica Wars	26	Japan	2014		Traditional
Magical Warfare	12	Japan	2014		Traditional
Magimoji Rurumo	12	Japan	2014		Traditional
Majin Bone	52	Japan	2014–15	TXN	Traditional
Maken-Ki! Two	10	Japan	2014		Traditional
Marvel Disk Wars: The Avengers	51	Japan	2014–15		Traditional
Mekakucity Actors	12	Japan	2014		Traditional
Merman in My Tub	13	Japan	2014		Traditional
Meshimase Lodoss-tō Senki: Sorette Oishii no?	13	Japan	2014		Traditional
Minna Atsumare! Falcom Gakuen	13	Japan	2014		Traditional
Mobile Suit Gundam-san	13	Japan	2014		Traditional
Momo Kyun Sword	12	Japan	2014		Traditional
Monthly Girls' Nozaki-kun	12	Japan	2014		Traditional
Mushi-Shi -Next Passage-	20	Japan	2014		Traditional
Mysterious Joker	13	Japan	2014–15		Traditional
Nanana's Buried Treasure	11	Japan	2014		Traditional
Nisekoi	20	Japan	2014		Traditional
No Game No Life	12	Japan	2014		Traditional
No-Rin	12	Japan	2014		Traditional
Nobunaga Concerto	10	Japan	2014		Traditional
Nobunaga the Fool	24	Japan	2014		Traditional
Nobunagun	13	Japan	2014		Traditional
Noragami	12	Japan	2014		Traditional
One Week Friends	12	Japan	2014		Traditional
Oneechan ga Kita	12	Japan	2014		Traditional
Oreca Battle	51	Japan	2014–15		Traditional
Oshiri Kajiri Mushi 3	10	Japan	2014	NHK BSP	
Parasyte -the maxim-	24	Japan	2014–15		Traditional
Persona 4: The Golden Animation	12	Japan	2014		Traditional
The Pilot's Love Song	13	Japan	2014		Traditional
Ping Pong the Animation	11	Japan	2014		Traditional
Pretty Rhythm: All Star Selection	11	Japan	2014		Traditional
PriPara	140	Japan	2014–17		Traditional
Psycho-Pass 2	11	Japan	2014		Traditional
Pupa	12	Japan	2014		Traditional
Rage of Bahamut: Genesis	12	Japan	2014		Traditional
Rail Wars!	12	Japan	2014		Traditional
Re:_Hamatora	12	Japan	2014		Traditional
Recently, My Sister Is Unusual	12	Japan	2014		Traditional
Riddle Story of Devil	12	Japan	2014		Traditional
Robot Girls Z	9	Japan	2014		Traditional
Romantica Clock	3	Japan	2014		Traditional
Ronja, the Robber's Daughter	26	Japan	2014–15		CGI
Rowdy Sumo Wrestler Matsutaro!!	23	Japan	2014		Traditional
Sabagebu!	12	Japan	2014		Traditional
Sailor Moon Crystal Season I: Dark Kingdom	14	Japan	2014–15	Niconico	Traditional
Saki: The Nationals	13	Japan	2014		Traditional
Sakura Trick	12	Japan	2014		Traditional
Samurai Jam -Bakumatsu Rock-	12	Japan	2014		Traditional
Seitokai Yakuindomo*	13	Japan	2014		Traditional
Selector Infected WIXOSS	12	Japan	2014	MBS	Traditional
Selector Spread WIXOSS	12	Japan	2014	Tokyo MX	Traditional
Sengoku Basara: End of Judgement	12	Japan	2014		Traditional
The Seven Deadly Sins	24	Japan	2014–15		Traditional
Shirobako	24	Japan	2014–15		Traditional
Shōnen Hollywood -Holly Stage for 49-	13	Japan	2014		Traditional
Silver Spoon 2	11	Japan	2014		Traditional
Sin Strange+	12	Japan	2014		Traditional
SoniAni: Super Sonico the Animation	12	Japan	2014		Traditional
Soul Eater Not!	12	Japan	2014		Traditional
Space Dandy	13	Japan	2014		Traditional
Space Dandy 2	13	Japan	2014		Traditional
Strange+	12	Japan	2014		Traditional
Sugar Soldier	3	Japan	2014		Traditional
Sumiko	8	Japan	2014	AT-X	
Sword Art Online II	24	Japan	2014		Traditional
Terra Formars	13	Japan	2014		Traditional
Terror in Resonance	11	Japan	2014	Fuji Television	Traditional
Tesagure! Bukatsu-mono Encore	12	Japan	2014		CGI
Tokyo ESP	12	Japan	2014		Traditional
Tokyo Ghoul	12	Japan	2014		Traditional
Tonari no Seki-kun: The Master of Killing Time	21	Japan	2014		Traditional
Tribe Cool Crew	50	Japan	2014–15		Traditional
Trinity Seven	12	Japan	2014		Traditional
Tsukimonogatari	4	Japan	2014		Traditional
Wake Up, Girls!	12	Japan	2014		Traditional
When Supernatural Battles Became Commonplace	12	Japan	2014		Traditional
Witchcraft Works	12	Japan	2014		Traditional
Wizard Barristers: Benmashi Cecil	12	Japan	2014		Traditional
Wolf Girl and Black Prince	12	Japan	2014		Traditional
Wooser's Hand-to-Mouth Life: Awakening Arc	12	Japan	2014		CGI
World Conquest Zvezda Plot	12	Japan	2014		Traditional
The World Is Still Beautiful	12	Japan	2014		Traditional
World Trigger	73	Japan	2014–16		Traditional
Yamishibai: Japanese Ghost Stories 2	13	Japan	2014		
Yo-kai Watch	214	Japan	2014–18	TXN	Traditional
Yona of the Dawn	24	Japan	2014–15		Traditional
Your Lie in April	22	Japan	2014–15		Traditional
Yowamushi Pedal Grande Road	24	Japan	2014–15		Traditional
Yu-Gi-Oh! Arc-V	148	Japan	2014–17	TXN	Traditional
Yuki Yuna is a Hero	12	Japan	2014		Traditional
Z/X Ignition	12	Japan	2014		Traditional

== See also ==
- List of animated feature films of 2014
- List of Japanese animation television series of 2014
