= Mind Blowing Breakthroughs =

- English title card.
- Genre: Dramedy; Action; Education
- Voices of: Nolan Balzer; Robyn Slade; Corny Rempel
- Countries of origin: Argentina; South Korea; Canada
- Original languages: English; Spanish; Korean
- No. of seasons: 3
- No. of episodes: 78

Production
- Running time: 12-13 minutes
- Production companies: Educational Broadcasting System; Grafizix Co. Ltd (그래피직스); Astrolab Motion

Original release
- Network: Astro TVIQ; Da Vinci Kids; Kids Central
- Release: February 1, 2014 – present

Mind Blowing Breakthroughs (Spanish: Ideas Rompe-Cráneos, Korean: 허풍선이 과학쇼) is an Argentinian-South Korean animated series.

== Plot ==
Baron Munchausen and his assistants, Betty and Merdock, try to impress his audiences with the scientists of the world. In season 3, the Baron and his friends need to stop Leipzig and his genie from causing chaos around the world.

== Episodes ==
=== Season 1 ===
No. overall	No. in season	Title
1	1	"The Genius of Leonardo Da Vinci Part 1"
2	2	"The Genius of Leonardo Da Vinci Part 2"
3	3	"Louis Pasteur and the Hidden Universe of Micro-Organisms Part 1"
4	4	"Louis Pasteur and the Hidden Universe of Micro-Organisms Part 2"
5	5	"Thomas Alva Edison vs. Nikola Tesla - Competition Moves Society Forward Part 1"
6	6	"Thomas Alva Edison vs. Nikola Tesla - Competition Moves Society Forward Part 2"
7	7	"The Lumière Brothers and the Dream-Maker Machine Part 1"
8	8	"The Lumière Brothers and the Dream-Maker Machine Part 2"
9	9	"Santos-Dumont, The Wright Brothers and the Dream of Flying Part 1"
10	10	"Santos-Dumont, The Wright Brothers and the Dream of Flying Part 2"
11	11	"Jang Yeong-sil & History and Principles of Time Measurement Part 1"
12	12	"Jang Yeong-sil & History and Principles of Time Measurement Part 2"
13	13	"Charles Darwin & the Evolution of Species Part 1"
14	14	"Charles Darwin & the Evolution of Species Part 2"
15	15	"Marie Curie & the Invisible Rays Part 1"
16	16	"Marie Curie & the Invisible Rays Part 2"
17	17	"Galileo Galilei & Reason Over Common Sense Part 1"
18	18	"Galileo Galilei & Reason Over Common Sense Part 2"
19	19	"Isaac Newton and the Forces of the Universe Part 1"
20	20	"Isaac Newton and the Forces of the Universe Part 2"
21	21	"Zhang Heng & the Science of Earthquakes Part 1"
22	22	"Zhang Heng & the Science of Earthquakes Part 2"
23	23	"Dmitri Mendeleev & the Origin of Things and the Periodic Table of Elements Part 1"
24	24	"Dmitri Mendeleev & the Origin of Things and the Periodic Table of Elements Part 2"
25	25	"Albert Einstein & Light, Space and Time Part 1"
26	26	"Albert Einstein & Light, Space and Time Part 2"

=== Season 2 ===
No. overall	No. in season	Title
27	1	"Pain Management Part 1"
28	2	"Pain Management Part 2"
29	3	"Means of Orientation Part 1"
30	4	"Means of Orientation Part 2"
31	5	"Robotics Part 1"
32	6	"Robotics Part 2"
33	7	"Means of Locomotion Part 1"
34	8	"Means of Locomotion Part 2"
35	9	"D.N.A. Part 1"
36	10	"D.N.A. Part 2"
37	11	"The Origin of the Universe Part 1"
38	12	"The Origin of the Universe Part 2"
39	13	"Radio & TV Part 1"
40	14	"Radio & TV Part 2"
41	15	"Dinosaurs Part 1"
42	16	"Dinosaurs Part 2"
43	17	"Extreme Environment Part 1"
44	18	"Extreme Environment Part 2"
45	19	"The Science of Clothing Part 1"
46	20	"The Science of Clothing Part 2"
47	21	"Food and Nutrition Part 1"
48	22	"Food and Nutrition Part 2"
49	23	"Space Science Part 1"
50	24	"Space Science Part 2"
51	25	"Plants and Ecosystems Part 1"
52	26	"Plants and Ecosystems Part 2"

=== Season 3 ===
No. overall	No. in season	Title
53	1	"An Apotheotic Show Part 1"
54	2	"An Apotheotic Show Part 2"
55	3	"Adventures in Arabia Part 1"
56	4	"Adventures in Arabia Part 2"
57	5	"Orpheus's Lyre Part 1"
58	6	"Orpheus's Lyre Part 2"
59	7	"The Volcanoe's Whispering Part 1"
60	8	"The Volcanoe's Whispering Part 2"
61	9	"Bandoneon Memories Part 1"
62	10	"Bandoneon Memories Part 2"
63	11	"Much Ado About the Lullaby Part 1"
64	12	"Much Ado About the Lullaby Part 2"
65	13	"The Voodoo King Part 1"
66	14	"The Voodoo King Part 2"
67	15	"Upper Paleolithic Part 1"
68	16	"Upper Paleolithic Part 2"
69	17	"Music for Peace Part 1"
70	18	"Music for Peace Part 2"
71	19	"Music and Emotion Part 1"
72	20	"Music and Emotion Part 2"
73	21	"Rhythm in the Blood Part 1"
74	22	"Rhythm in the Blood Part 2"
75	23	"Return the Samba Part 1"
76	24	"Return the Samba Part 2"
77	25	"Mumble Jumble Music Show Part 1"
78	26	"Mumble Jumble Music Show Part 2"
