= The Amazing Awang Khenit =

Malaysian animated TV series

- Genre: Action; Adventure; Comedy
- Created by: Syamsul Ikram Ghazali (Rambai)
- Developed by: Sead Studios
- Written by: Rambai
- Directed by: Syamsul Ikram Ghazali (Rambai)
- Voices of: NurFarhan Noorazman; Shahril Fahmey; Irma Ahmad; Azman Zulkiply; Khairur Rizal Jalani; Aimo
- Theme music composer: Rambai
- Opening theme: The Amazing Awang Khenit Intro
- Ending theme: Timang Tinggi-Tinggi by Pheelers
- Country of origin: Malaysia
- Original language: Malay
- No. of seasons: 2
- No. of episodes: 38

Production
- Running time: 11 minutes per episode
- Production company: Sead Studios Sdn Bhd

Original release
- Network: TV9 (Season 1) (2014-2018); TV3 (Season 2) (2019-present)
- Release: 2014 – 2019

The Amazing Awang Khenit is a Malaysian animated children's television series produced by SEAD Studios. Launched in 2014, the show incorporates elements of Malaysian folklore and slapstick comedy.

The original trailer for the show was one of 20 winners of the MSC IPPC award for the animation category, and finished third in the 2012 TBS DigiCon6 short film and animation contest. In 2015 it was nominated for Best animated series at the Malaysia Film Festival. As of the same year, the show was viewed weekly by an audience of 2.4 million. Originally airing on TV9, Awang Khenit moved to the Mediacorp Suria channel in January 2016.

== Synopsis ==
The main character, Awang Khenit, is unable to grow up after being cursed by a wizard at the age of ten, who Awang believes, has also kidnapped his parents. Using various super powers, Awang protects the fictional town of Indrasakti from the series' villains.

== Broadcast ==
Season	Episodes	Aired on TV9	
Season	Episodes	First aired	Last aired
1	26	11 October 2014	2015

Season	Episodes	Aired on TV3	
Season	Episodes	First aired	Last aired
2	TBA	23 March 2019	TBA

On 23 March 2019, The Amazing Awang Khenit Official facebook page updated that they're back with a new season and episodes. Season 2 starts aired on TV3, at Saturdays on 10.30 am and later, moved to Fridays on 5:00 pm.

== Character ==
- Awang Khenit - the main character who has been cursed unable to grow up.
- Badang
- Puteri Melati
- Tun Berong
- Raja Mustafar
- Seri Bibah
- Erni Susila

== Episodes ==
=== Season 1 (2014-2015) ===
No. in series	No. in season	Malay Title	Synopsis (Malay/English)
1	1	Misteri Puteri Melati	A giant known as "Monster Kedah" has come to attack Inderasakti. Raja Mustafar and Tun Berong have asked for Awang Khenit's help. Apparently the Monster Kedah just wanted to play futsal. Later, Princess Melati has been kidnapped by Si Bongkok. With the help of Awang Khenit, Si Bongkok was arrested and imprisoned.
2	2	Geng Jabai	The Jabai gang headed by Jabai Putih has been stirring at Inderasakti by robbing Bank Inderasakti. Then, Awang Khenit and Badang came to help and beat them through a contest responding to mathematical questions proposed by the Bibah Series and Tun Berong.
3	3	Memori Silam	Awang was dreaming of his parents who had disappeared since 10 years ago. It is said that his parents were kidnapped by a mysterious creature and that the creature also had sworn Awang to be small forever.
4	4	Angkara Makhluk Jadian 1	Patin Jadian has stirred in Inderasakti by eating all the catfish that are in the river. Awang and Badang went to investigate the problem and managed to find Lubuk Patin Jadian with the help of a magical snail named Sir Alex Parkinson. During the battle, Badang was tricked by the Patin Jadian trick. As a result of eating the vomit of Patin Jadian is said to be able to add strength, instead it has made Badang a gentle person.
5	5	Angkara Makhluk Jadian 2	Awang was commissioned by Raja Mustafar to search for Jin Temasik, the jinn who made Badang strong once. But Jin Temasik is said to have moved to a foreign planet and can not be traced. Then King Mustafar ordered Awang to look for Tok Kerisik for help.
6	6	Angkara Makhluk Jadian 3 (Akhir)	With Tok Kerisik's help, Awang finally managed to find Jin Temasik on Planet Kayaban. Armed with the "Jin Temasik's vomit " product, finally Badang was successfully restored from the curse of Patin Jadian and back into a mighty man.
7	7	Makhluk Besi Dari Angkasa	Utama Prem from Planet Hyperkron has come to Indersakti to seek refuge from the evil Didikon clan, led by Meghetun. It was said Didikon had attacked Hyperkron so it was destroyed. But, it seems Main Prem is just a stroke. Meghetun is just a dentist to take care of Utama Prem, or the real name of Opocot Prem who has a severe tooth problem.
8	8	Anugerah Cinta Prestij	Tun Berong wants to find true love for himself. A grandmother has met Tun Berong to help him find true love. The grandmother had asked Tun Berong to go to Paya Curiga and meet Sang Cinta. Tun Berong asked for Awang and Badang's help to go to Paya Curiga and track down Sang Cinta. To track down Sang Cinta they have to overcome some obstacles to get to Paya Curiga. They have to go through some tests that test about “understanding feelings” and “creating trust” in order to get past the Paya Curiga. Tun Berong has successfully passed all the tests with the help of Awang and Badang. Finally, Tun Berong also managed to meet Sang Cinta and because of his success in overcoming all obstacles, Sang Cinta bestowed a true love on Tun Berong. That is love of work.
9	9	The Dendam-Jers	Nik Ferry has commissioned great agents Slack Window, Perkasa Nyor, Iron Den and Haikal to persuade Awang Khenit to join The Dendam-Jers. The Dendam-Jers is a group of superheroes who are the agents of F.I.E.L.D.S, led by Nik Ferry. But his request was rejected by Awang because he did not want to join the group.
10	10	Pertarungan Dua Sejoli	Seri Bibah invites a beautiful girl named Aishah to meet, but there is competition from a man who is a professional wrestler named Triple AAA. Triple AAA invites Seri Bibah to fight for Aishah. The Bibah series met Awang to practice in order to defeat Triple AAA. On the day of the fight, Seri Bibah managed to overthrow the AAA Triple in the first round. In the second round, Triple AAA has used black power to call The Lock and merge into Triple Lock. The Bibah series was defeated and Triple AAA managed to get Aishah. However, apparently Aishah was crazy for a year due to playing the phone for too long.
11	11	Nostalgia Hutan Hitam	Seri, which is an invincible wolf, is hopeless because he is often bullied by the indusctic community. Then Kambala, his best friend suggested to steal the yellow cloth given by a blind uncle to Awang Khenit. The cloth was a coat shawl that became the cause of Awang's strength. However, apparently he had stolen Awang's bath towels instead of the Awang cloth.
12	12	Oh, My Actor	An Americano actor named Joni Deep has come to Indersakti to see Awang. Joni Deep asks Awang's help to teach her ways to become a superhero for her upcoming movie. But Roberto, Joni Deep's agent seems to have been mistaken. Joni Deep is not chosen to be a hero, but as a part-time character.
13	13	Misi Pendekar Harimau	PHB (Pendekar Harimau Berantai) has fallen into bankruptcy despite being rich when it became Frakees ambassador. Because too hungry, PHB intends to rob the Frakees factory. Awang tried to beat him but did not succeed. Finally, PHB managed to break into the factory and continue to fetch the food it deems Frakees. But apparently PHB was mistaken for the factory, which is a mosquito repellent factory and inedible.
14	14	Dalam Hati Ada Taman	Tun Berong has put his love on Princess Melati. One day, Puteri Melati had invited Tun Berong to meet, and Tun Berong's heart was so blooming. But apparently, Tun Berong has been stunned by the Kebayan Merah's student who have disguised themselves as the appearance of the Princess Melati.
15	15	Derita Kongkang Suci	A Kongkang has requested Badang's help to find a way back to his original place because the congress has lost his memory. With the help of Badang finally conquering it to its original place. It turns out that the conglomerate was a pupil of Kebayan Merah. The Kebayan Merah has overturned the Kongkang to forget his memory. This is because handsome men from National Biography have come to take pictures around Indrasakti.
16	16	Kelembai Satu Di Situ	Kelembai is a giant who can change anything into stone, stealing the mysterious artifact from the castle. The artifact was handed over to Kak Sally who was hired by Karim, who was a member of Megat Tani. Finally, Kelembai was arrested by Awang and regretted his actions. Then, Awang gave him a suitable job with the power he had.
17	17	Putera Katak Dan Sham	Prince Frog from Tempurung Jaya came to Inderasakti with a merchant ship. The Prince's Frog's intentions were to apply for Princess Melati to be his wife and to restore her original condition to humans. Prince Frog said that he was originally a handsome human prince, was sworn frog. But Awang did not believe in the words of the Frog. Later, Princess Melati offers a bungalow to the Prince Frog if she wants to stay in Indrasakti. Apparently the bungalow was meant a prison.
18	18	Lubang Puaka	Inderasakti was shocked by the news of the emergence of a mysterious deep hole. The rumor said that in the hole there was a scary giant. Awang Khenit, Badang, Tun Berong and Seri Bibah investigated the mysterious hole. During the investigation, Awang lost one by one his friend. While, the secret of Badang, Seri Bibah, Tun Berong and Erni were unraveled. They practiced playing Silat Fighter video games and tried to hide from Awang because Awang was too reliable to play the game.
19	19	Mesyuarat Gua	Megat Tani dan Karim are discussing and investigate life of Awang after cursed by jin that kidnapped Awang's parents.
20	20	Pendatang Dari Masa Depan	A male cyborg robot from the future named Coordinator has been sent to Inderasakti to take a man named Din into the future. Awang and Badang tried to stop because they thought that the Coordinator was malicious, but failed. Eventually the Coordinator managed to also bring young Din into the future. The young Din is brought in to meet the future Din, apparently to help him wash the dishes at a diner.
21	21	KEROMUT LAND	Tun Berong found an egg on the beach while he was relaxing. The egg was apparently owned by a magical dragon. The dragon had met Tun Berong to ask for his egg back but Tun Berong did not want to return it. Then, Awang came with Badang to solve the problem. Instead, the dragon was ferocious. Until suddenly the dragon's wife came and scolded her husband for leaving the eggs that he should have taken care of everywhere in the house. Apparently the egg that Tun Berong had was just a wound that was painted like the original dragon's egg.
22	22	Siput Ajaib Kembali	A "monster" has attacked Inderasakti. The reason the "monster" attacked was to find a snail named Sir Alex Parkinson. Apparently the "monster" was just a suit worn by a small alien from the land of Ink Learn. The creature was the mother of Sir Alex Parkinson. The reason Sir Alex Parkinson’s mother came to Inderasakti was to bring Sir Alex Parkinson back to Ink Learn to get married there.
23	23	Geng Jabai Menganas	The Jabai gang has escaped from prison and made a mess once again in Inderasakti. This time, the Jabai Gang has robbed a gold shop and has kidnapped an aunt to be held hostage. The Jabai gang then fled into the forest along with the kidnapped aunt. The next day, the Jabai Gang went to meet the buyers of their stolen gold but Awang Khenit came suddenly. Apparently the gold is artificial gold. As a result, the Jabai Gang was arrested with the owner of the fake gold shop once.
24	24	Liga Ninja Tuntung	3 tuntung ninja have come to Indersakti for a walk. While they were resting, they felt very hungry and decided to rob the grocery store in Inderasakti but they kept stealing by mistake. Their actions were finally known to Awang and Badang. When Awang and Badang arrived at the grocery store, they fought with the 3 tuntung ninja. But their fight stopped when a woman arrived to ask for the rent of a fake shell worn by the 3 tuntung ninja. Because there was no money, the 3 tuntung acted to run away quickly.
25	25	Hadiah Terindah (Bahagian 1)	Seri and Kambala have enlisted Awang's help to find a special birthday gift for Sang Lapan. The special gift is so mysterious and can only be found in a magical shop located on top of Mount Rokan. With the help of Tok Kerisik, they managed to reach Mount Rokan and to reach the top of the mountain they have to pass 3 types of obstacles.
26	26	Hadiah Terindah (Bahagian 2)	Awang, Seri and Kambala continued their journey and slowly they managed to overcome all three obstacles. Finally they arrive at the top of Mount Rokan and meet the keeper of the magical shop. The guardian had given a very special gift to Sang Lapan. When the three of them arrived at the Black Forest, Seri and Kambala handed over the gift to Sang Lapan. Sang Lapan saw the gift which was a very beautiful pair of shoes. However, Sang Lapan was so angry and dissatisfied because he was a legless snake.

=== Season 2 (2019) ===
No. in series	No. in season	Malay Title
27	1	Inderasakti TV
28	2	Operasi Lubuk Salak Bahagian 1
29	3	Operasi Lubuk Salak Bahagian 2
30	4	Misteri Mimpi Berong Bahagian 1
31	5	Misteri Mimpi Berong Bahagian 2
32	6	Misteri Mimpi Berong Bahagian 3
33	7	Amarah Si Godam Bahagian 1
34	8	Amarah Si Godam Bahagian 2
35	9	Serangan Mutasi Sungai Bahagian 1
36	10	Serangan Mutasi Sungai Bahagian 2
37	11	Serangan Mutasi Sungai Bahagian 3
38	12	Projek Animasi Mantop!
