= Inspector Mergou =

TV series or programアルジェリアのアニメ

- Genre: Computer animation
- Created by: Med Aymen Jaouadi
- Directed by: Anis Mzali, Khali Gobji

Production
- Executive producer: Med Aymen Jaouadi
- Producers: Imed Hanouda, Memmi Merouane, Med Aymen Jaouadi
- Running time: 4 mn
- Production company: Not Found Prod Algerie

Original release
- Network: Echorouk TV
- Release: 28 June 2014 – 2015

Inspector Mergou is an Algerian computer-animated series produced by Not Found Prod Algerie in 2014, in the form of SMS and passing game on television in prime time. It is considered the first Algerian computer-animated series ever made.

== Description ==
The Inspector "Mergou" is an Algerian private investigator who works on social crimes. He faces puzzles and solves them without revealing the answers to the audience, thereby encouraging them to participate in the game and identify the culprit from several suspects. Participation in the game is done by sending the answer via SMS. At the beginning of the next episode, the inspector "Mergou" reveals the identity of the culprit.
