= List of Hero Bank episodes =

Hero Bank is a 2014 anime television series by TMS Entertainment, based on the video game of the same name by Sega. Set in a world where people participate in "Hero Battles" to earn money, an elementary school student named Kaito Gōshō ends up with a ten billion yen debt after renting out a powerful suit known as Enter the Gold. The series began airing on TV Tokyo from April 7, 2014, and is being simulcast by Crunchyroll. For the first 26 episodes, the opening theme is "Kasege! Jarinko Hero!" (かせげ！ジャリンコヒーロー, Rake It In! Money Hero) by Nobuaki Kakuda, whilst the ending theme is "Sayonara Mata Itsuka" (サヨナラマタイツカ, Goodbye, Like Always) by Meg. For episodes 27 to 51, the opening theme is "Kasege! Jarinko Hero" performed by Kakuda featuring Kamen Joshi, whilst the ending theme is "SARB" by High Speed Boyz.

== Episode list ==
No.	Title	Original release date
1	"Bling Bling￥ Enter the Gold Appears!!"; Transliteration: "Jarin Jarin￥ Entā za Gōrudo Tōjō!!" (Japanese: じゃりんじゃりん￥ エンター・ザ・ゴールド登場!!)	April 7, 2014
Kaito Gōshō, an elementary school student who runs the Gappori Company alongside his friends Mitsuo Zaizen and Fukuta Kanemaru, rushes to the aid of their companion, Nagare Amano, who is being bullied. Kaito manages to get back Nagare's wallet by beating one of the bullies, Raigo Raigou, in a Hero Battle, a digital battle game using rented battle suits powered by support from spectators. Later that day, Raigo brings his older brother, Shuuto, to challenge Kaito to another match for revenge, deciding to make Kaito his henchman should he win. However, during the middle of the battle, the rental period for Kaito's 'Bad Boy General' suit expires, leaving him naked and defenceless. Just then, a strange man named Sennen appears before Kaito, offering him a contract for a powerful hero suit called Enter the Gold. Kaito hastily accepts the contract and uses Enter the Gold to defeat Shuuto and win the match. Following the match, however, Kaito learns that the fee for renting this suit is ten billion yen. Meanwhile, Nagare is approached by a mysterious figure, who offers him the same kind of power Kaito has.
2	"Sniper Cleaning ￥ Nagare Amano's Determination!!"; Transliteration: "Sunaipu Ōsōji ¥ Amano Nagare no Ketsui!!" (Japanese: スナイプ大そうじ￥ 天野ナガレの決意!!)	April 14, 2014
After Kaito's sister, Ai, learns about his debt, she has the Gappori Company help her stock up on toilet paper. Whilst at the supermarket, Kaito is challenged to a Hero Battle, but manages to earn a swift victory, even earning the admiration of Ai. Later, Nagare, deciding to test Kaito's strength, challenges him to a match with his rented hero suit, Snipe Sweeper. Nagare gains the upper hand by mopping the arena floor squeaky clean, leaving Kaito unable to use his close combat techniques. However, Kaito's determination to win allows him withstand Nagare's attacks and get close enough to deal the winning blow.
3	"Aim for Ten Billion Yen ￥ The Hero Wars Curtain Rises!!"; Transliteration: "Mezase Sen-oku-en ￥ Hīrō Wōzu Kaimaku!!" (Japanese: めざせ100億円￥ ヒーローウォーズ開幕!!)	April 21, 2014
A Hero Wars tournament is announced offering a grand prize of 10 billion yen, providing Kaito with just the opportunity needed to clear his debt. After Mitsuo explains the rules to Kaito and Fukuta, Kaito finds he needs to pay a 10,000 yen entry fee to enter. Meanwhile, Mitsuo receives a threatening e-mail telling him not to enter the Hero Wars if he doesn't want his mother to find out he had been playing Hero Battles when he wasn't supposed to. Following Fukuta's mouse Platina, Kaito discovers the culprit behind it is his teacher, Takeda, who has grown tired of students ignoring his lessons. Kaito challenges Takeda to a Hero Battle, pitting his Enter the Gold against Takeda's Magnum Teacher. Kaito is put under pressure as Takeda uses his own wages to fuel his battle money gauge and provide ammunition for his projectile attacks. But as Kaito expresses his desire to enter Hero Wars with Mitsuo, Mitsuo helps Kaito solve Takeda's trivia attacks and win the match, which also secures his place in the Hero Wars. As Kaito gains a new appreciation for studying, Takeda becomes more confident in his teaching.
4	"Perilous ￥ Kaito's Regent!!"; Transliteration: "Ayaushi ¥ Kaito no Rīzento!!" (Japanese: 危うし￥ カイトのリーゼント!!)	April 28, 2014
Kaito is instructed by Ai to get his hair cut, as it has grown to a ridiculous size. However, he finds that his usual barber, who normally styles his trademark regent hairstyle, has closed down his store due to a fancier salon, Salon de Delon, showing up nearby and taking his customers. Trying the salon for himself, Kaito gets upset when the hairdresser, Delon Arai, gives him a rainbow mohawk instead of his regent hairstyle. Kaito challenges Delon and his hero suit, Scissors Beauty, to a gamble match to try to get his hair back to normal, stating that if he loses, then Ai will get a rainbow mohawk as well. As the match begins, Kaito struggles against Delon's agility and shampoo attacks. However, Kaito's unwillingness to back down earns him the support of the spectators, who give him much battle money, allowing him to make a comeback and win the match with a single blow. Although Delon is unable to fix Kaito's hair, the usual barber, moved by Kaito's performance, reopens his store and gives Kaito his much-awaited regent hairstyle once again.
5	"Burst Angler ¥ A Meeting With Piscesamurai!!"; Transliteration: "Bakuchōri ¥ Uozamurai Kenzan!!" (Japanese: 爆釣り￥ウオザムライ見参!!)	May 5, 2014
Whilst trying to catch a fish for dinner, Kaito meets Isshin Uminari, a boy from the fish market, who helps him catch a large tuna. As thanks, Kaito and the others help Isshin out at his store, which is struggling due to a lack of fresh fish in the bay. Upon learning Isshin is participating in the Hero Wars, Kaito decides to have a match against his hero suit, Piscesamurai. As Isshin gets the upper hand due to his samurai techniques, powered by the support of the people on the bay, he reveals the bay is in trouble due to a nearby factory polluting the ocean and reducing the number of fish nearby, with Isshin desiring to save it using the Hero Wars prize money. Kaito states that he joined Hero Wars not just for the money, but because he loves Hero Battles too, encouraging Isshin to do the same. The two proceed to battle to their hearts' content, with Kaito ending up as the winner. After the battle, Kaito decides to help out the market by buying all the fish with his prize money, much to Aki's dismay.
6	"Big Detention Panic ¥ Black Cat Shadow Kitty!!"; Transliteration: "Inokori Dai Panikku ¥ Kuroneko Shadō Kiti!!" (Japanese: 居残り大パニック￥ 黒猫シャドーキティ！！)	May 12, 2014
With the school's yodelling club abolished, the Gappori Company seek to take over their clubroom to expand their operations, but are met with competition from another group, Gamitsui Corporation, led by Hana Akinai, who want to use it for their 'Detention Club', where they use their feminine charms to get boys to study. Upon investigating, Kaito and the others discover the girls of Gamitsui are using their whiles to receive presents from boys, which they pawn to bolster their funds. When some of the customers take argument upon not getting dates like their promise, Hana beats them in Hero Battles using her hero suit, Shadow Kitty, forcing the losers to become regular customers. Learning of this, Kaito challenges Hana to a Hero Battle with the yodelling club's room on the line. Managing to prove resilient to Hana's womanly charms, Kaito overcomes her attacks and wins the match. Despite her loss, Hana becomes determined to participate in the Hero Wars and find a boy that can make her happy. However, Kaito and the others discover that the yodelling club has reformed, putting their efforts in vain.
7	"Gappori Company Breakup ¥ Tea Picking Battle Royale!!"; Transliteration: "Gappori Kanpanī Kaisan ¥ Ochatsumi Batoru Roiyaru!!" (Japanese: ガッポリカンパニー解散￥おちゃつみバトルロイヤル!!)	May 19, 2014
Kaito and the others go to Fuji to help Fukuta's uncle and aunt pick tea leaves, in order to earn money to pay off their debt. Meanwhile, Nagare stays at home under the pretense of having to attend cram school, thinking over what he wants to do with himself. Later that night, Mitsuo notices something peculiar about a Snipe Sweeper participating in the Hero Wars. The next day, as Kaito and Mitsuo get into an argument with each other, Fukuta challenges both of them to a three-way Hero Battle between Kaito's Enter the Gold, Mitsuo's Game Console Beep Boop, and Fukuta's Tea Picking Cat. Mitsuo and Fukuta both team up against Kaito, but he throws their attacks back at them, and by the end of the match, everyone has forgotten why they were angry. Upon returning home, Kaito and the others learn Nagare is participating in the Hero Wars.
8	"Blue Impact ¥ The Dominion Dollar!!"; Transliteration: "Aoi Shōgeki ¥ Za Dominion Darā!!" (Japanese: 蒼い衝撃￥ザ・ドミニオン・ダラー!!)	May 26, 2014
Nagare, who is once again approached by the mysterious figure, Money Ghost, accepts his contract for power, becoming enveloped in digital energy and having his personal data removed from the city's network. Noticing a disturbance in the system, Sennen sends a mail out to Kaito, Mitsuo, and Fukuta. The next day, the three boys are disturbed to find no one besides them know who Nagare is, finding all records of him have been wiped. Speaking with reporter Maki Kashii, the boys hear a rumor about people being dragged into the Hero Bank airspace. Later that day, Kaito receives an e-mail from someone who knows about Nagare, calling the boys to meet with them at Gappolis. Arriving there, they encounter a mysterious man who challenges Kaito to a Hero Battle using a Hero Suit called The Dominion Dollar. Using the arena's lights to his advantage, Kaito manages to break his opponent's glasses, only to discover the face behind them is actually Nagare, who sacrificed his existence in the world in pursuit of power, claiming to be sick of being Kaito's subordinate. Rejecting Kaito's friendship and stating his desire to win the Hero Wars, Nagare defeats Kaito and tells him not to come near him again before returning to cyberspace.
9	"Fire Up ¥ Kaito Gosho's Intensive Training!!"; Transliteration: "Moeagare ¥ Gōsho Kaito no Daitokkun!!" (Japanese: 燃え上がれ￥豪勝カイトの大特訓!!)	June 2, 2014
Sennen appears before Kaito and the others, explaining how he protected their memories of Nagare from being rewritten and suggesting Kaito undergo training in order to become stronger. Shishio Torai, a delinquent with a crush on Ai, offers to help Kaito in this regard, though it all proves pointless since he isn't using a Hero Suit. Afterwards, Kaito and co. are invited to a 'Hero Wars Seminar' by Kasumi Kamimaki, who is soon revealed to be a scam artist who had conned many victims. Angered by this, Kaito challenges Kasumi to a Hero Battle against his Hero Suit, Trick Suit. As Kasumi uses various tricks and cheats to put his opponent at a disadvantage, Kaito, spurred on by the support of the scammed victims, recalls Shishio's training and manages to win the match, after which Kasumi is arrested.
10	"Protect It ¥ Steamy Hot Spring Switch Shock!!"; Transliteration: "Mamore ¥ Yukemuri Onsen Ten Shokku!!" (Japanese: 守れ￥湯煙温泉テンショック!!)	June 9, 2014
After winning a lottery in the shopping center, Kaito, Mitsuo, Fukuta, Ai, and Kaito's grandfather Zōan head to a hot spring inn, where Hana and the Gamitsui Corporation are coincidentally helping out. Later that night, Kaito accidentally breaks his Bankfon G after being spooked by Ai. Afterwards, Kaito runs into Hana, who explains she is trying to help out the inn, which holds a lot of memories for her, to keep it from being sold to a developer, before accidentally spraining her ankle. The next day, the developer, Ageo Sokoo, comes and smashes the inn's entranceway, trying to coerce the owner into selling the inn. Wanting to protect Hana's memories, Kaito challenges Sokoo to a Hero Battle against his Hero Suit, Heavy Builder, with the inn on the line. However, as Kaito has to borrow Mitsuo's Bankfon G whilst his is still broken, he struggles with using Mitsuo and Fukuta's Hero Suits as they don't match his head on style. Hana, reminding Kaito what's at stake, lends him her Shadow Kitty Hero Suit and gives him advice on how to best use everyone's suits to his advantage and win the match.
11	"100 out of 100 Bulls-eyes ¥ A Big Riot at the Fortune-Telling Match, Though!!"; Transliteration: "Hyakuhatsu Hyaku-chū ￥ Uranai Batoru de Ōsōdō dakedo!!" (Japanese: 百発百チューッ￥占いバトルで大騒動だケド!!)	June 16, 2014
Fukuta gets into an argument with his prophecy-predicting mouse, Platina, after he gets special treatment concerning a fortune teller being essential to the team's victory. After storming off, Fukuta comes across a fortune teller named Tamako Futoi, who seems to be popular due to her predictions concerning Hero Battles. As Fukuta decides to get his fortune told, he ends up buying a pricey fortune telling slip machine from her in the hopes of competing against Platina, only to find its predictions worthless. Whilst trying to return it, Fukuta spots Shishio, who was conned by Tamako, trying to get his money back by fighting in a Hero Battle against her Shryne Maiden Hero Suit, but ends up losing and has to buy another item. As Kaito decides to go up against her for a refund on Fukuta's item, Tamako adds a rule stating that if Kaito loses, she will take Platina. With Kaito struggling due to be unable to decipher Platina's predictions, Fukuta wrecks Tamako's stand, revealing that her 'predictions' are merely a preference for good looking participants. Hearing more about Tamako's weak points, Kaito follows Fukuta's advice and strips naked, disgusting Tamako and leaving her open to attack. Afterwards, Fukuta and Platina make up with each other.
12	"Man of Steel ￥ Kintetsu!!"; Transliteration: "Hagane no Otoko ￥ Kintetsu!!" (Japanese: 鋼の漢(おとこ)￥キンテツ!!)	June 23, 2014
With the Hero Wars preliminaries nearing its end, Kaito struggles to find opponents willing to fight him. Whilst he and the gang go with Ai to a factory in Iron Town to get her fridge fixed, some delinquents appear and cause trouble but are handled by the manager Koutetsu's son, Tetsunosuke "Kintetsu" Kanagata, whose arms were replaced with robotic parts whilst protecting Koutetsu from an explosion. Kaito and Ai return the next day to thank Kintetsu and help him and Koutetsu out, later learning that the factory is in debt. Asked by Ai to look into the matter, the Gappori Company learn from Sennen and Isshin that the company behind the debts is Cyber Emperor, the one also responsible for the factory polluting the bay near the fish market. Stating that the only way to pay off his family's debt is to win the Hero Wars, Kintetsu challenges Kaito to a Hero Battle with his Hero Suit, Karate Deiku. Despite struggling against Karate Deiku's iron body, Kaito manages to use a technique Kintetsu taught him to win the match, after which the two promise to meet each other in the finals.
13	"Flash Descent ￥ Deborah Kizaki!!"; Transliteration: "Kiratto Kōrin ¥ Debora Kisaki!!" (Japanese: キラッと降臨￥デボラ貴崎!!)	June 30, 2014
As Iron Town comes under attack by Cyber Emperor due to Kintetsu's family failing to pay off their debt, Kaito confront's the company's president, Deborah Kizaki, who claims to have purchased Iron Town and plans to turn it into a theme park. Kaito puts his Enter the Gold suit on the line to win Iron Town back from Deborah in a Hero Battle scheduled for the next day. As Deborah does a background check on Kintetsu, desiring to take the rights to his iron body, Kaito is approached by Sennen and brought to his hideout. Sennen warns Kaito that Deborah's suit, Baron the Euro, is a prototype designed to be more powerful than Enter the Gold. Later that night, as the news depicts Kaito's challenge to Deborah in a negative light, Isshin and Kintetsu pay him a visit to give their support. As the battle begins the next day, Deborah uses a poison ability to drain Kaito's strength, and despite Kaito's best efforts, he is overwhelmed by Deborah and loses the match. However, before Deborah can claim his prize, Sennen disrupts the airspace and brings Kaito back to his hideout with Enter the Gold intact. Meanwhile, Money Ghost prepares to unleash his Gold Force, with Nagare and Deborah included, to go against Sennen.
14	"Trillion Swiftness ￥ Enter the Speed!!"; Transliteration: "Chōshinsoku ￥ Entā za Supīdo!!" (Japanese: 兆神速￥エンター・ザ・スピード!!)	July 7, 2014
As the demolition of Iron Town continues, Deborah acquires a patent for Kintetsu' iron body and sends one of his minions, Rohan Yuri, to capture him so he can mass produce it. With Kaito determined to rescue Kintetsu, Sennen informs him that Enter the Gold has some hidden abilities, but notes Kaito doesn't yet have the requirements to access them. Later, Maki, who had discovered the scathing new reports about Kaito were fake, mentions there are many dark rumors surrounding Debora, including being behind the explosion that injured Kintetsu, stating they need to find solid evidence to prove it. In order to distract Deborah so that Mitsuo and Fukuta can infiltrate his network, Kaito challenges him to a rematch, with Isshin and Koutetsu putting their own stakes on Kaito's victory. As Kaito is once again overwhelmed by Deborah's speed, Mitsuo and Fukuta manage to successfully access his files and expose them to the media. Receiving support from the angered citizens, Kaito's burning passion grants him access to a new form; Enter the Speed, giving him the speed to outmaneuver Deborah and defeat him, earning his place in the Hero Wars finals. Following the battle, all of Cyber Emperor's assets are frozen by Nagare, eliminating Deborah's rights to Iron Town and Kintetsu.
15	"Off-site Sprint ￥ Catch Up, Overtake, Uproot!!"; Transliteration: "Jōgai Shissō ￥ Oitsuke Oikose Hikkonuke!!" (Japanese: 場外疾走 ￥ 追いつけ追いこせ引っこぬけ!!)	July 14, 2014
On his way to the venue of the Hero Wars finals, Kaito and co. get a lift from a speed-loving man. As the tournament begins, Isshin, Hana, and Nagare clear their first matches. Kaito ends up pitted against the man he met earlier, former F1 racer Hayaiyen Messa, and his hero suit, The Grand Prix, whose speed proves to be a match even for Enter the Speed. Despite Enter the Speed causing a strain on his body, Kaito's determination to never give up allows him to overtake Hayainen and defeat him. Whilst returning home, Hayainen, who was burdened with a past accident that caused him to quit racing, decides to put it behind him and focus on improving his Hero Battle skills.
16	"Stromy Transfer Student ￥ Li-Chi Long!!"; Transliteration: "Haran no Tenkosei ￥ Ron Rīchi!!" (Japanese: 波乱の転校生￥龍里千!!)	July 21, 2014
Kaito arrives at school to find that Li-Chi Long, a young Chinese boy he encountered at the Hero Wars venue, has transferred into his class. Long soon starts attracting attention with his academic and physical prowess, prompting Kaito to try and befriend him. He invites Long to his house to try Zōan's pickled produce, which reminds Long of his own grandfather, who he entered the Hero Wars for. To repay an earlier debt, Long decides to have a Hero Battle with Kaito using his suit, The All Powerful Ura Dragon, ahead of the finals. After a trade of blows and gags, the match ends in a draw, after which Kaito decides to make Long the Gappori Company's vice-president, unaware that he is actually under the employ of Nagare.
17	"Round 2 ￥ Adults Have Their Own Problems!!"; Transliteration: "Ni-kaisen￥ Otona wa Otana de Taihen nanda!!" (Japanese: 2回戦￥大人は大人で大変なんだ!!)	July 28, 2014
In the A-block of the Hero Wars, Kintetsu faces off against Rohan and his suit, The Dostorbrewski, but ends up losing against his powerful armor. Wanting to become strong enough to beat him, Kaito tries to follow Long's advice and become 'nothingness', with not much success. Whilst at a karaoke bar, Kaito runs into his next scheduled opponent, Tometoshi Kakarimachi, who accidentally damages his Bankfon, though chooses not to force him to pay for the damages after hearing his sob story, instead leaving the repairs to Long. The next day, Kaito battles against Tometoshi's suit, Hilaryman, and despite Tometoshi being a rather weak fighter, Kaito finds himself hassled by a bug that Long had secretly installed, causing his special attacks to damage himself. Tometoshi, filled with confidence, upgrades to Kachoryman and goes on the offensive, soon upgrading to Gocharyman. With both fighters pushed to their limits, Kaito suggests they finish things in the buff, with Kaito ending up as the victor. Despite his loss, Tometoshi finds new respect from his family.
18	"Heavy Attire ￥ The Dostorbrewski!!"; Transliteration: "Jūsō ¥ Za Dosutorūburusukī!!" (Japanese: 重装￥ザ・ドストルーブルスキー!!)	August 4, 2014
After a meeting with Nagare, Rohan, and Money Ghost, Long is interrogated by Mitsuo and Fukuta over what happened during the previous match. However, they just assume that Long had simply struggled to fix Kaito's Bankfon properly and give him the more minor punishment of participating in the Detention Club for a day. The next day, Kaito faces up against Rohan, who reveals he is a member of the Gold Force. Despite Rohan's strength, Kaito becomes eager to have fun fighting him, winning the battle with some tactical job switches. As a result of Rohan's defeat, Nagare has him disappear, revealing to Kaito he is also a member of the Gold Force.
19	"Merciless ¥ The All-Powerful Ura-Dragon's Rampage!!"; Transliteration: "Reikoku Muzan ¥ Za Mugen Uradora Bōsō!!" (Japanese: 冷酷無残￥ザ・ムゲン・ウラドラ暴走!!)	August 11, 2014
Sennen meets up with an acquaintance, who is acting as a spy for him, trying to learn more about Money Ghost. Meanwhile, Hana is lined up to face against Long, with the winner moving on to face Kaito in the semifinals. Later that day, Long spends the day helping out the Gappori Company with helping others, though is promptly reminded of his mission by Nagare. The next day, Sennen appears before Kaito and the others, revealing Long is a member of Gold Force, though Kaito refuses to believe him. As the fight between Long and Hana begins, Long is conflicted between his friendship with Kaito and his mission to get revenge for his grandfather's death, but in the end, he casts aside his emotions and launches a vicious counter-attack against Hana, continuing to beat on her even after he wins. As Long vows to meet Kaito in the finals, Hana soon picks herself up and focuses on sales to earn money.
20	"Drastic Measures ¥ Nagare vs. Isshin!!"; Transliteration: "Ittōryōdan ￥ Nagare tai Isshin!!" (Japanese: 一刀両断￥ナガレVS一心!!)	August 18, 2014
As Kaito and the others argue with each other over Long, Isshin helps them cool their heads with a water gun fight. After the guy manage to clean the pool together, during which Isshin learns Nagare, his next opponent, was everyone's friend, everyone comes around to swim in the pool. Meanwhile, Long drops by Kaito's house to drop off some food, receiving some words of advice from Zoan. The next day, Isshin faces off against Nagare, hoping to open his eyes, but is no match for Nagare's overwhelming strength.
21	"The Semifinal ¥ Even If You're Broke, Smiles are Free!!"; Transliteration: "Junkesshō ¥ Kane ga Nakutemo Nikkori Zero Yen!!" (Japanese: 準決勝￥金がなくてもニッコリ円!!)	August 25, 2014
Kaito has doubts about facing Long, but receives some encouragement from Zoan after he brings some of Long's pickled vegetables. As the match between Kaito and Long begins, Long starts to hesitate when Kaito's dedication reminds him of his youth with his grandfather. However, Long's suit suddenly takes a life of its own, dishing out brutal attacks against Long's will. As Long fights against the suit's control, feeling betrayed by Money Ghost, Kaito understands Long's desire to have a fair fight, reminding him that people can smile whether they have money or not. After a final clash, Kaito wins the match, his feelings finally managing to reach Long, who disappears with a smile on his face after Nagare downsizes him.
22	"Final Round ¥ Gold vs Dominion!!"; Transliteration: "Kesshōsen ¥ Gōrudo tai Dominion!!" (Japanese: 決勝戦¥ゴールドvsドミニオン!!)	September 1, 2014
As Money Ghost offers Nagare any wish he desires should he win the championship, Kaito finds a wallet Nagare gave him and asks Ai for some advice. The next day, as Nagare gets an early lead in his match against Kaito, he expresses his desire to surpass Money Ghost and fully remove himself from everyone's memories. However, Kaito reminds Nagare that even if he erases everyone's memories, the fact he existed will still remain. After managing to knock away Nagare's guns, Kaito uses the funds the Gappori Company had raised together to launch a powerful attack that wins the match and the championship.
23	"Battle of the Century ¥ Challenge Segalion!!"; Transliteration: "Seiki no Issen ¥ Nozome Segarion!!" (Japanese: 世紀の一戦￥挑めセガリオン!!)	September 8, 2014
While Nagare is taken to hospital following the battle, Kaito is awarded his championship prize and the opportunity to fight the world champion, Ryouta Arashiyama, and his hero suit Segalion. After the group get together at Kaito's house to celebrate his victory, the battle between Kaito and Ryouta begins, with both fighters evenly matched and Kaito emerging as the eventual victor. Following the match, however, it is revealed Ryouta was actually a virtual puppet created by Money Ghost, who announces the Hero Wars were all his plan in order to awaken a key. After Sennen chases him off, he takes Kaito and the others to a secret facility underneath their clubroom known as Gold Base. There, Sennen and his assistant, Hikari Takarano, reveal that Money Ghost is actually the creator of Hero Battles, Adachi Sumimori, who has sworn revenge against money for the tragedies it has brought. The group soon learn that Nagare has been kidnapped by Adachi, who plans to use him to overwrite the world.
24	"Cash Extinction ¥ Money Ghost's Counterattack!!"; Transliteration: "Genkin Shōmetsu ¥ Manē Gōsuto no Gyakushū!!" (Japanese: 現金消滅￥マネーゴーストの逆襲!!)	September 15, 2014
After learning from Sennen about the Underbank cyberspace Adachi resides in, Kaito meets up with the Hero Bank company president, Kinzo Sengoku, who explains he is unable to give Kaito his prize because Money Ghost's interference has put his company in trouble. Just then, Adachi puts his plan into action, using Nagare's power to drain everyone's bank accounts and remove money from the world. He then covers the world in cyberspace and unleashes an army of Megalion Ghost Hero Suits to destroy the city. Learning the Megalions are made from data, Kaito and the others are able to use their Hero Suits to fight back, earning battle money from around the world. With more people joining the fight, Kaito heads towards the Underbank to rescue Nagare.
25	"Mega Explosive Birth ¥ Enter the Hero!!" (Japanese: 兆爆誕 ¥ エンター・ザ・ヒーロー!!)	September 22, 2014
Learning that Long and Rohan are somewhere in the Underbank, the group split up, with Sennen arriving to help Kaito as he heads towards Nagare's location. Kaito is confronted by Adachi, who forces him into a match against his hero suit, The End of Money. Mitsuo and Fukuta manage to awaken Long and Rohan and together they join Kaito in battle, managing to knock Adachi back. However, Adachi brings out his ultimate hero suit, The Apocalypse, to fight back. Rejecting a world where working hard makes no difference, Kaito receives support from all over the world and unlocks a new suit, Enter the Hero, using it to defeat Adachi and return money to the world. However, the overwrite hasn't stopped, so Kaito heads on towards Nagare.
26	"Conclusion ¥ The First and Last Big Brawl!!"; Transliteration: "Ketchaku ¥ Saisho de Saigo no Daigenka!!" (Japanese: 決着￥最初で最後の大ゲンカ!!)	September 29, 2014
Nagare proves to still be hostile, as his new evolved hero suit, Justice Dollar, is revealed to be the one causing the overwrite, with Adachi planning to use his negative energy to convert the world into data. Learning Justice Dollar is the one controlling Nagare, Mitsuo and Fukuta manage to gather the data for Long's virus and have Kaito infect Nagare's suit with it, leading him to get hit by his own attack. Nagare starts to come to his senses, realising the folly of his ways, but is suddenly possessed by Justice Dollar's backup system, leading to one final clash between Kaito and Nagare, ending in a double knockout which stops the overwrite. As the city reverts to normal, Adachi stays behind to let Kaito and the others escape the Underbank before it collapses in on itself. While Kaito and Nagare rekindle their friendship, another boy watches over them.
27	"The Money Fairy ¥ Boochakkin Ka-ching!!"; Transliteration: "Okane no Yōsei ¥ Būchokkin Jakin!!" (Japanese: お金の妖精¥ブーチョッキンじゃきん!!)	October 6, 2014
Following the Money Ghost incident, Kaito, whose debt is waived by Sennen, uses his ten billion yen prize to help out his friends, using what's left over for a bath of Yummy Sticks. Three months later, the Gappori Company has grown in popularity, with people regularly challenging Kaito and Nagare to tag battles. Mitsuo in particular is pleased with how much money the company is earning, even making plans for a movie adaptation, though the others don't necessarily share his enthusiasm. Just then, a pig-like "money fairy" named Boochokkin emerges from Kaito's BankFon, demanding a lot of money to eat in exchange for an appearance in their movie. Meanwhile, a mysterious totem pole appears and spreads virtual space across the town, sending hero suits to turn everything in the candy store into money. Sick of everyone arguing over the movie instead of protecting the candy store, Kaito gives all of Gappori Company's money to Boochokkin, who gives Kaito and Nagare new Bank Registers, allowing them to transform into their hero suits. The enemy hero suits start using black money to recover their battle money, but thanks to the appearance of a sudden electric ball, Kaito and Nagare manage to beat their opponents, banishing the totem and returning the candy store to normal. After Boochokkin is dismayed to find that since he ate all of Gappori Company's funds, the movie can't be made, the boy who saved them, Sekito Sakurada, transfers into Kaito's class.
28	"Friend of Foe ¥ Sekito Sakurada!!"; Transliteration: "Teki ka Mikata ka ¥ Sakurada Sekito!!" (Japanese: 敵か味方か¥桜田セキト!!)	October 13, 2014
Kaito becomes bewildered by the actions of Sekito, while Nagare notices he possesses his own Bank Register. The next day, as Kaito and the others accompany Ai to a supermarket opening, the market is suddenly attacked by another 'Tower of Seizure', bringing forth more Rampage Suits, Tick-A-Tack and Snap Shutter. As Kaito and Nagare struggle against their ability to stop time, they manage to use their abilities against each other and defeat them. Afterwards, Nagare confronts Sekito about who he is at school, but is seemingly crushed when he protects Kaito from a falling Tower of Seizure.
29	"Money is Power ¥ Ryuuga Tennouji Makes Landfall!!"; Transliteration: "Zeni Koso Chikara ¥ Tennōji Ryūga Ōriku!!" (Japanese: ゼニこそ力￥天王寺龍牙上陸!!)	October 20, 2014
After being helped by Sekito upon being knocked out by the barrier Tower of Seizure, Kaito learns from Hikari that Nagare was most likely converted into data and absorbed into the tower rather than crushed. Meanwhile, in the market district, a strange man named Ryuuga Tennouji attempts to buy out the fishmongers and cause dispute among their business partners. Isshin attempts to fight against him, but Ryuuga quickly defeats him before using another Tower of Seizure on the fish market to seize all of its property. Upon learning of the situation, Kaito confronts Ryuuga and his hero suit, Like the White Tiger, which proves to be too powerful for even Enter the Hero, forcing Sekito to rescue him. As Kaito laments not being able to beat Ryuuga, a man calling himself the cabinet prime minister suddenly emerges from his toilet.
30	"Take Down the Seven Gods of Suits ¥ Kaito's a Special Agent!!"; Transliteration: "Taose Nana Fuku Yami ¥ Kaito wa Tokumei Ēgento!!" (Japanese: 倒せ七服神 ¥ カイトは特命エージェント!!)	October 27, 2014
31	"Osaka Business Trip! That Man is Taiga!!"; Transliteration: "Ōsaka Shucchō! Sono Otoko, Taiga!!" (Japanese: 大阪シュッチョー! その男、大河!!)	November 3, 2014
32	"Business Partnership! It's Ryouma Ishin!!"; Transliteration: "Gyōmu Teikei \ Ishin Ryōma ze yo!!" (Japanese: 業務提携 \ 維新漁馬ぜよ!!)	November 10, 2014
33	"Ultra Evolution! Enter the Prize!!"; Transliteration: "Chō Shinka \ Entā・Za・Puraizu!!" (Japanese: 兆進化 \ エンター・ザ・プライズ!!)	November 17, 2014
34	"Searing Hot Revenge! Kaito vs. Ryuuga!!"; Transliteration: "Gekiatsu Ribenji \ Kaito VS Ryūga!!" (Japanese: 激熱リベンジ \ カイトVS龍牙!!)	November 24, 2014
35	"Absolute Obedience! Do as Mr. Torai Says!!"; Transliteration: "Zettai Fukujū \ Torai-Sama no Iu Tōri!!" (Japanese: 絶対服従 \ 虎井様の言う通り!!)	December 1, 2014
36	"Okinawa Business Trip! The Money of the Dead!!"; Transliteration: "Okinawa Shucchō \ Manē・Obu・Za・Deddo!!" (Japanese: 沖縄シュッチョー \ マネー・オブ・ザ・デッド!!)	December 8, 2014
37	"Strongest Tag-team Formation! Kaito and Sekito!!"; Transliteration: "Sakkyō Taggu Kessen \ Kaito & Sekito!!" (Japanese: 最強タッグ結成 \ カイト&セキト!!)	December 15, 2014
38	"Hiroshima Business Trip! Honorless Money Battle!!"; Transliteration: "Hiroshima Shucchō \ Jingi Naki Manē Battoru!!" (Japanese: 広島シュッチョー \ 仁義なきマネーバトル!!)	December 22, 2014
39	"Seizure Robo! King Benten!!"; Transliteration: "Sashiosae Robo ¥ Benten-Ō!!" (Japanese: 差押えロボ￥弁天王！！)	January 5, 2015
40	"Frugality is Justice! The Nagoya Cheapskate Battle!!"; Transliteration: "Setsuyaku ya Seigi \ Nagoya Dokechi Kessen!!" (Japanese: 節約や正義 \ 名古屋ドケチ決戦!!)	January 12, 2015
41	"To Tohoku! Toilet Recovery Mission!!"; Transliteration: "Iza Tōhoku! Toire Dakkan Sakusen!!" (Japanese: いざ東北へ \ トイレ奪還作戦!!)	January 19, 2015
42	"Castaways! Big Money Company Assemble!!"; Transliteration: "Hyōryū \ Atsumare Gappori Kanpanī!!" (Japanese: 漂流 \ 集まれガッポリカンパニー!!)	January 26, 2015
43	"A Shock! Kaito Has Amnesia!!"; Transliteration: "Shokku \ Kaito wa Kioku Sōshitsu!!" (Japanese: ショック \ カイトは記憶喪失!!)	February 2, 2015
44	"Cyber Spirit World! The Kaito Rescue Mission!!"; Transliteration: "Dennō Reikai \ Kaito Kyūshutsu Dai Sakusen!!" (Japanese: 電脳霊界 \ カイト救出大作戦!!)	February 9, 2015
45	"Best of the Best! The Prize Yen Dragon!!"; Transliteration: "Chōjōjō \ Puraizu・¥・Doragon!!" (Japanese: チョージョージョー \ プライズ・￥・ドラゴン!!)	February 16, 2015
46	"Promotion! What is Sekito the Head of?!" Transliteration: "Shōshin \ Sekito wa Ittai Nan Buchō!?" (Japanese: 昇進 \ セキトはいったい何部長!?)	February 23, 2015
47	"Risky Battle! Rescue Sekito Sakurada!!"; Transliteration: "Risukī Batoru \ Sakurada Seito o Sekuidase!!" (Japanese: リスキーバトル \ 桜田セキトを救い出せ!!)	March 2, 2015
48	"The Last of the Seven Gods of Suits! The Risky Life!!"; Transliteration: "Saigo no Nana Fuku Kami \ Risukī・Za・Jinsei!!" (Japanese: 最後の七服神 \ リスキー・ザ・人生!!)	March 9, 2015
49	"Astonishing! Butt-naked in a Money Tornado!!"; Transliteration: "Gyōten \ Manē Tonēdo de Supponpon!!" (Japanese: 仰天 \ マネートルネードでスッポンポン!!)	March 16, 2015
50	"Union of Friendship! The Yen-Dollar Million!!"; Transliteration: "Yūjō Gattai \ Ji・Endoru・Mirion!!" (Japanese: 友情合体 \ ジ・エンドル・ミリオン!!)	March 23, 2015
51	"Smiles Are Free! We Are Big Money Company!!"; Transliteration: "Nikkori 0-en \ Oratachi wa Gappori Kanpanī!!" (Japanese: ニッコリ0円 \ 俺たちはガッポリカンパニー!!)	March 30, 2015
