= Al-Rawi (TV series) =

- الراوي
- Genre: Children's; Historical
- Written by: Mohamed Kamal Hassan; Mustafa Zayed
- Directed by: Sameh Mostafa
- Original language: Arabic
- No. of seasons: 1
- No. of episodes: 30

Production
- Production companies: ActPro; Quinced

Original release
- Release: 2014

Al-Rawi (Arabic: الراوي, lit. “The Narrator”) is an Egyptian animated series recounting key events in Islamic history in Classical Arabic. The story's eponymous “Narrator” is named Noureddin, and he tells his stories to the young Prince Shehab.

== Synopsis ==
The plot centers on a man who uses science to become King Imad al-Din's vizier. Threatened by Imad al-Din's jealousy, the scientist foments war between Imad al-Din and Noureddin, a jailed former king.

== Crew ==
Major Arab actors participated in the voice cast, including Yousuf Shaaban, Sawsan Badr, Alaa Morsy, Hassan Abdel Fattah, Khaled Saleh, and Abdel Rahman Abou Zahra. Sameh Mustafa was the director.
