= List of Baby Steps episodes =

This is a list of episodes from the anime Baby Steps. The first 25-episode season aired from April 6 to September 21, 2014. The second 25-episode season aired from April 5 to September 20, 2015. Both seasons were simulcast by Crunchyroll.

== Episode list ==
=== Season 1 ===
The first season of Baby Steps introduces us to Eiichirō Maruo. He is a person who manages to get straight A's in all of his classes from his meticulous note taking. One day he decides he needs to put more exercise into his schedule and finds a pamphlet for a free tennis class. Eiichirō attends and falls in love with the game. He slowly turns his habits from studying for class to studying for tennis. Season 1 covers the first two years and introduces us to his friends at STC Tennis Club.

| No. | Title | Original air date |
|---|---|---|
| 1 | "Tennis and Notes"; Transliteration: "Tenisu to Nōto" (Japanese: テニスとノート) | April 6, 2014 |
Eiichirō is a study prodigy who has tons of methodical notes that even the teachers envy. One day Eiichirō is looking at his schedule trying to figure out how he can exercise. That same day Natsu Takasaki arrives looking for help on an upcoming World History exam. The class refers her to Eiichirō, who lets her have his original World History study notes. Natsu accidentally damages the notes, but in order to thank Eiichirō she invites him to STC for a free tennis tryout as a way of doing his exercise.
| 2 | "Methodical and Unorganized"; Transliteration: "Kichōmen to Ōzappa" (Japanese: 几帳面と大雑把) | April 13, 2014 |
Eiichirō is unable to answer Natsu when she asks him what he enjoys doing most. He becomes interested in tennis and returns to STC for another free trial. This time, he meets Egawa Takuma, an upperclassman who's friendly with Natsu. For some reason, he acts hostile towards Eiichirō, which is very intimidating. As Takuma watches, Natsu teaches Eiichirō how to hit the ball.
| 3 | "The Contest is a Fight"; Transliteration: "Kenka de Shōbu" (Japanese: 喧嘩で勝負) | April 20, 2014 |
Eiichirō is unable to forget how good it felt when he successfully returned Takuma's serve, and he spends all of his time practicing against the wall. After seeing Eiichirō practice against the wall non-stop for six hours on a Sunday, Natsu predicts that he will quickly improve.
| 4 | "Face of Conviction"; Transliteration: "Ganmen de Kakushin" (Japanese: 顔面で確信) | April 27, 2014 |
Eiichirō and Takuma Egawa face off in a serving match. Eiichirō has 50 serves to try and return a shot from Takuma. At first Eiichirō can't even get to the shots, but slowly he begins to adapt and starts returning the shots foul. After 49 shots Eichiro has adapted to Takuma's speed, forcing Takuma to change his serve on his 50th shot. As the episode ends, Coach Miura asks Eiichirō to have his first match in the upcoming Kanagawa Junior Circuit.
| 5 | "A First Match Full of Surprises"; Transliteration: "Hatsushiai ga Yosōgai" (Japanese: 初試合が予想外) | May 4, 2014 |
Eiichirō is about to play his first match. He receives advice from the other STC members, but it only makes him more nervous. He doesn't get a chance to calm himself down as he's soon called to the tennis court. His first opponent is Oobayashi Ryo, a player with five years of experience, the assistant captain of the tennis team at Shonan Tech, and a top eight finalist in the prefectural tournament. It's finally time for Eiichirō's first match!
| 6 | "Diamond in the Rough"; Transliteration: "Mijuku Genseki" (Japanese: 未熟が原石) | May 11, 2014 |
It is down to the final match of the set. Eiichirō trails 5 games to 1, but with a determination to stay on the court as long as possible Eiichirō begins to push Oobayashi. Coach Miwa notices that Eiichirō has sharp eyes and is able to predict his opponents next move when he is focused. The final match lasts close to an hour, and in the end Eiichirō is unable to score a single point in the final match. Oobayashi learns this was Eiichirō's first match and begins to fear what Eiichirō will become if he is diligent with practice while gaining control and more muscles. The next day Eiichirō returns to the Kanagawa Junior Circuit, despite having been eliminated, to study various tennis playing styles. Coach Miura notices him there and tells him if he really wants to improve, he should come to STC the next morning at 7 AM.
| 7 | "Nine-Square and Reality"; Transliteration: "9 Bunkatsu to Genjitsu" (Japanese: 9分割と現実) | May 18, 2014 |
In order to improve Eiichirō's playing, Coach Miura has him learn control on a 9-square court. After getting the basics done, Eiichirō is forced into a match against Takuma. Takuma realizes that Eiichirō has gained control but proceeds to show Eiichirō that control and good eyesight are nothing compared to experience. Coach Miura then instructs Eiichirō and Takuma to continue playing each other as often as possible. 3 months after the Kanagawa Junior Circuit, Coach Miura asks Eiichirō to sign up for the Championship Match Tournament to see how much he has improved.
| 8 | "One Year and Twenty Notebooks"; Transliteration: "1-nen to 20-satsu" (Japanese: 1年と20冊) | May 25, 2014 |
Maruo Eiichirō continues his training at STC as he tries to master every shot. At smaller tournaments he begins advancing to the third round but is unable to go further. His mother worries that Eiichirō is spending too much time on tennis when he drops out of cram school to practice more. Eiichirō begins calling Natsu Nat-chan. After one year of playing Maruo prepares to return to the Kanagawa Junior Circuit and make it past the third round, but in order to do so he'll likely have to defeat three seeded players.
| 9 | "Diligence is my Style"; Transliteration: "Majime Ga Sutairu" (Japanese: 真面目がスタイル) | June 1, 2014 |
Eiichirō returns to the Kanagawa Junior Circuit. His first match is up against fellow high school student Koshimizu Nariyuki, a man who is always trying to compete with Eiichirō for the top scores. Eiichirō is a little too tense and quickly falls behind 3-0 when he finds a note from Natsu at the back of his notebook talking about what to do if he feels too tense. With this help Eiichirō rebounds and wins 6-3, beginning a process that would take him into a third round match with 5-seed Miyagawa. However Miyagawa is confident and proclaims he has learned Eiichirō's weakness after watching one match. Match 2 begins as Eiichirō takes on the 52-seed Noborikawa. With no tension Eiichirō easily advances with a 6-1 win. After the match Eiichirō watches Miyagawa's match to see what his tennis style is truly like to get him ready for the 3rd round.
| 10 | "Unease on the Edge"; Transliteration: "Iwakan to Gakeppuchi" (Japanese: 違和感と崖っぷち) | June 8, 2014 |
The match between Eiichirō and Miyagawa begins with each holding serve. However Eiichirō feels that something is off. After studying his notes, Eiichirō realizes that Miyagawa has been studying his shots, and with a 4-3 lead he plans on making his move in the eighth game. If Miyagawa manages to break Eiichirō in the 8th game, the set will be all over. Instead of getting too depressed, Eiichirō changes his strategy and starts playing serve and volley tennis. The change of pace allows Eiichirō to win Game 8 and even it at 4-4, but will either competitor manage to break serve, and will Eiichirō be able to find his winning shot before it becomes too late?
| 11 | "Risk and Possibility"; Transliteration: "Risuku to Kanōsei" (Japanese: リスクと可能性) | June 15, 2014 |
After managing to hold serve Eiichirō starts looking for an opportunity to break Miyagawa. Both hold serve and force a tiebreaker. With the score 6-5 Maruo in the tiebreaker Eiichirō decides to try and gamble to use his full stroke and steal a point. The gamble backfires and Miyagawa evens the score 6-6. However Eiichirō's gamble makes Miyagawa think too much during his serve. He falls victim to a double fault, giving Eiichirō the match point opportunity on his serve. Seeing no other choice, Miyagawa makes a move to the net to catch Eiichirō by surprise. However Eiichirō's racket happens to be in the right spot for a return from short distance. Eiichirō's miracle return gives him the tiebreaker 8-6 and the match 7-6. The crowd is shocked as the 5-seed has been knocked out.
| 12 | "Improvement by Memory"; Transliteration: "Kioku de Shinka" (Japanese: 記憶で進化) | June 22, 2014 |
After defeating Miyagawa, Eiichirō returns to STC for some training that will make him better in 1 day. Eiichirō is teamed up with a Coach Mike from Florida who specializes in psychological training. Mike is envious of Eiichirō's notes and points out his notes will help him recall his shots faster, and that he only has 20 seconds to recall his best memories. Eiichirō is able to master this basic training of Mike, and in round 4 he defeats the 16-seed Terashima with relative ease. A broken string forces him to go to the tennis shop where he meets his quarterfinal opponent, 3-seed Iwasa Hiromi. Hiromi doesn't seem to have any interest in Eiichirō. After Hiromi leaves, the shop owner explains that Hiromi doesn't get to know his opponents in advance. Instead he learns and draws an image of them while they're playing on the court. Eiichirō is confused by this and wonders how someone can draw pictures while playing.
| 13 | "Art and Technique"; Transliteration: "Geijutsu to Gijutsu" (Japanese: 芸術と技術) | June 29, 2014 |
The match between Hiromi and Eiichirō begins. Everytime Eiichirō tries to go on the attack, Hiromi hits a shot Eiichirō can't reach. Hiromi goes up 1-0, but then Eiichirō realizes if he lets Hiromi complete his masterpiece and then returns the final shot, he will win the point. Eiichirō manages to go up 5-2 when Hiromi begins to increase his speed. Hiromi cuts it back down to 5-4. Eiichirō envisions his best match, the match against Terashima, and with that vision he comes up with a plan he believes will allow him to move on to the semi-finals.
| 14 | "Putting the Pieces Together"; Transliteration: "Pazuru no Seika" (Japanese: パズルの成果) | July 6, 2014 |
It is match 10 of a 1-set match, and Eiichirō leads 5 games to 4. Eiichirō begins to up his speed against Hiromi, and with it he stays even at 30-30. Just then Hiromi's legs cramp up, allowing Eiichirō to get two easy aces and win the match 6-4. After the match Hiromi announces he is going to focus less on tennis and start drawing more on the canvas. However he tells Eiichirō that he appears to have the same desires to go Pro that a lot of the other top 4 do, even though he is currently only playing for the fun of it. Eiichirō scouts Araya only for Araya to win 6-0 and then tell Eiichirō he will crush him in the next match. The semifinals are set to occur in 2 days time, so Eiichirō uses that evening and the next day to practice. Coach Miura tells Eiichirō he needs to focus on his tennis style instead of trying to play to Araya's game and makes him take practice easy. The day of the semifinal comes, and Miyagawa comes to cheer for Eiichirō. Miyagawa helps Eiichirō realize that looking for an opponent's weakness actually helps that opponent improve, so Eiichirō decides to ask Takuma what Araya's weakness is. When he finally finds them, he sees Araya whispering something to Takuma that could change the entire outcome of the future.
| 15 | "Plan to be Forceful"; Transliteration: "Gōin ga Keikaku" (Japanese: 強引が計画) | July 13, 2014 |
Eiichirō overhears Araya telling Takuma that if he loses to him this tournament, he will retire from tennis. His plan is to defeat Takuma and then announce he is going pro. Takuma agrees to tell Eiichirō Araya's weaknesses. Eiichirō comes up with 5 steps that give him the first game in a 3-set match. After going up 30-0 in game 2, Araya protests a point and receives a warning. However the protest allows Araya to get into the zone. Araya manages to win the next 6 games with ease and goes up 1-0. In set 2 Eiichirō studies all of Araya's shots from set 1 and realizes he can predict Araya's movements. Down 1-0 in set 2 Eiichirō finally manages to reverse Araya's counter shot and go up Love-15. How will this exciting match end?
| 16 | "Beast and Initiative"; Transliteration: "Yajū to Shudō-ken" (Japanese: 野獣と主導権) | July 20, 2014 |
After going up Love-15, Araya uses a number of service aces to go up 3-1 in set 2. Eiichirō holds serve, and as he gains a 30-40 advantage in Game 6 of Set 2, Araya punches himself in his face to eliminate his emotions from the game. Both players manage to hold serve, giving Araya a 5-4 advantage in what could be the final game. Eiichirō decides to gamble and begins to predict where Araya will hit his shots. With the two even at 30-30, Araya serves knowing that whichever player wins the point will hold the advantage for the rest of the match.
| 17 | "Pro At My Age"; Transliteration: "Puro de Dōkyūsei" (Japanese: プロで同級生) | July 27, 2014 |
Araya and Eiichirō end up at deuce after neither player can gain an advantage. An ace end up being huge for Araya give him the match point advantage, and despite his best efforts a lucky bounce proves to be the end for Eiichirō as he loses 6-1, 6-4. The finals are held between Araya and Takuma. Takuma plays to his best ability and once again prevails, 4-6, 7-5, 7-5 to win the championship. As Eiichirō returns to his bag he runs into an unknown youngster named Ike Souji. Ike asks to see Eiichirō's notes before running off due to an important phone call. However he asks Eiichirō to inform Coach Miura that he will soon be visiting STC. After the awards ceremony is held, the others vow to defeat Eiichirō in the All Japan Junior before Eiichirō says he can't participate due to his low showings the year before. However he swears he'll get ready for the Inter-High. As Eiichirō gets home, he gets rewarded for his performance, but he shocks his parents when he asks them what they'd think if he decided to go Pro at tennis.
| 18 | "Determination and Presentation"; Transliteration: "Ketsui de Purezen" (Japanese: 決意でプレゼン) | August 3, 2014 |
Eiichirō investigates going Pro, but his reaction from his parents is less than he expected. Eiichirō joins Natsu at the first round of the All Japan Pro to watch the debut match of Ike Souji. Afterwards he puts together a presentation for his parents on going Pro and asks for one year where he won't have to study or attend cram school so he can make the All Japan Junior. Should he fail to win the All Japan Junior, Eiichirō will turn his entire focus to studying. After gaining approval Eiichirō informs his coaches at STC, who come up with a hellacious schedule, both for practice and for tournaments, that will qualify him for the All Japan Junior. At the end of the episode Ike Souji appears to greet his old friends at STC, and after getting approval from his coach, manager, and doctor he gets 10 minutes of practice time with each STC member who volunteers to face him. When his doctor, coach, and manager disappear, Ike grabs a hold of the ball and asks Eiichirō to play a practice match with him during the remaining time instead of just hitting the ball back and forth.
| 19 | "Resolve and Hell"; Transliteration: "Kakugo to Jigoku" (Japanese: 覚悟と地獄) | August 10, 2014 |
Eiichirō manages to steal 1-point in the 10-minute match with Ike before his coaches reappear and make him stop playing a match. Afterwards Eiichirō is sent home to rest. The next day Eiichirō begins a brutal practice regiment that will recondition his body into that of a pro's. After 2 weeks of practice Eiichirō is invited by Coach Miura to come view some of the top seeds at the All Japan Junior. Eiichirō finds a fellow kindred spirit in terms of note taking and is shocked to learn he is the 2-seed. Eiichirō quickly realizes his data will allow him to control his opponents shots if his body gets conditioned correctly.
| 20 | "Meat Buns and Yakisoba"; Transliteration: "Nikuman to Yakisoba" (Japanese: 肉まんと焼きそば) | August 17, 2014 |
Eiichirō participates in a tournament after 3 months of hellish training. He learns about active rest while participating in the tournament and makes it to the final. Terashima is his opponent. Eiichirō shocks Terashima with how his game has changed and manages to win 6-1, 6-0. In all of his matches the closest game was 6-2. After the match Coach Miura informs Eiichirō he will have a week off before they do another 3 weeks of hellish training. He informs Eiichirō that this type of training will continue for the rest of the year, with him eventually getting down to only two days of rest in between. With a week off, Eiichirō helps his school perform their yearly cultural festival, a festival which ends up serving only to bring him and Natsu a little closer.
| 21 | "Consistency and Change"; Transliteration: "Kenjitsu to Henka" (Japanese: 堅実と変化) | August 24, 2014 |
Eiichirō continues his practice and gets his next tournament schedule. As the last player to qualify he is placed up against the 1-seed, Yu Nabae. Eiichirō begins to look for weaknesses from Yu on tape, but what he finds is a highly adaptive style that could easily beat him if he doesn't come up with a few tricks.
| 22 | "Fundamentals are the Weakness"; Transliteration: "Kihon ga Jakuten" (Japanese: 基本が弱点) | August 31, 2014 |
Yu Nabae matches up with Eiichirō and realizes they really are two players that are virtually the same. He realizes that what Eiichirō lacks is experience with the fundamentals, as he has never played anyone like himself, and after losing the first set Nabae begins to pull away and goes up 5-2.
| 23 | "Reckless 100-Square"; Transliteration: "Mubōna 100 bunkatsu" (Japanese: 無謀な100分割) | September 7, 2014 |
In an effort to try and reverse the tide, Eiichirō decides to go back to his idea of having 100-squares to aim for instead of 9. The precision allows him to begin winning some points, but more often than not Nabae watches balls go out and gets some easy points. How many games will Eiichirō manage to win against Nabae, and will he be able to gain a break?
| 24 | "Duty and Desire"; Transliteration: "Gimu to Yokkyū" (Japanese: 義務と欲求) | September 14, 2014 |
Eiichirō runs to watch Natsu's match when he learns she is in danger of losing. Afterwards they return to STC where he Ryuhei Aoi, a man who will become his new coach. At first he doesn't trust Ryuhei's words, but he is even more shocked when Coach Miura says all of his training is being turned over to Ryuhei, and Ryuhei won't let him do any practice the next two days.
| 25 | "Eichiro and Natsu"; Transliteration: "Eiichiro to Natsu" (Japanese: 栄一郎と奈津) | September 21, 2014 |
Eiichirō and Natsu go out on their first date. When Eiichirō asks Natsu what she thinks about him, she tells him he is cheating. Afterwards Eiichirō is allowed to resume practice. He learns how important it is for your ego and your subconscious to match up evenly. Coach Ryuhei decides the only way Eiichirō can meet his goals is to go to Florida during the winter break.

=== Season 2 ===
For season 2 Eiichirō has decided he wants to go pro. His mother has said he must win the All-Japan Juniors this year if he is going to become a Pro. If he fails, he must return to a life of studying for a doctorate degree of some sort. Eiichirō is given permission to attend a scholarship program in Florida as part of the training. The scholarship lasts for two weeks. New characters are introduced as Eiichirō finds out how different tennis is in the world compared to tennis in Japan. Among the characters are 19-year-old Pro Alex O'Brien and his younger sister Marcia.

| No. | Title | Original air date |
|---|---|---|
| 1 | "The World and the Wall"; Transliteration: "Sekai to Kabe" (Japanese: 世界と壁) | April 5, 2015 |
Eiichirō arrives in Florida, and Coach Mike introduces him to Marcia, an upcoming junior whose older brother just made the Pro's. Marcia and Eiichirō play a match, and Marcia decides Eiichirō must be training for the French Open because of his slow play style. Eiichirō is introduced to his new dorm mates, among which are Alex O'Brien, the older brother of Marcia. The next morning at breakfast Eiichirō is welcomed by Ike Souji, and his dorm mates begin to see him as a rival since Ike acknowledged him. Eiichirō's dorm mates are introduced to his 39 notebooks of tennis. Eiichirō and Alex are announced as a match for day one, but Alex refuses since Eiichirō isn't a Pro. Ike arrives and promises Eiichirō's dorm mates that anyone that can beat Eiichirō will be able to play him in the next two weeks. Eiichirō plays Alex in his first official match at the Florida Tennis Academy. During the day he learns about the video cameras showing his technique and the resources of the many coaches available.
| 2 | "A Vicious Circle Is Lucky"; Transliteration: "Akujunkan ga Lucky" (Japanese: 悪循環がラッキー) | April 12, 2015 |
Eiichirō begins closing the gap on the others at the Florida Academy, but during everyone of his matches he has one moment where he presses too hard, costing him a set and eventually costing him the match. Coach Mike takes Eiichirō to the video room and points out this pattern. He suggests Eiichirō find a way to remain calm during the match. If he can do so, he'll be able to reverse this tide. During one match Eiichirō accidentally trips, but while error costs him a point it awakens him to the world of repetitive patterns in tennis. By using a pattern he finds in the match, Eiichirō is finally able to win his first set in America.
| 3 | "Data for the Future"; Transliteration: "Mirai no Data" (Japanese: 未来のデータ) | April 19, 2015 |
After winning his first match in America, Eiichirō finally gets to play Ike in a one set match. Ike gets it approved at the New Years party where many of Eiichirō's new friends first learn of Natsu. Eiichirō plays Ike and begins to collect data on what the players in the world of the Pros is like. On his final day in Florida the coach proposes Eiichirō and Alex play a 3-set match. Alex learns how fearsome the notebook can be as he is forced to change his play pattern after Eiichirō breaks him twice. Eiichirō wins Set One 6-2.
| 4 | "Awakening to Simplicity"; Transliteration: "Simple de Kakusei" (Japanese: シンプルで覚醒) | April 26, 2015 |
In his final day in Florida Alex agrees to play a best-of-3 match with Eiichirō. Alex realizes that Eiichirō's notes contain all of his weaknesses and that he will have o adjust his play style to win the match. Alex willingly loses the first set to get used to a new stroke, and Eiichirō is unable to fully take advantage of it in his data. As Alex's play style continues to evolve Eiichirō realizes he will need to hit easy shots at the Pro to grow the most and find a new weakness.
| 5 | "Takuma's Decision"; Transliteration: "Takuma no Ketsui" (Japanese: タクマの決意) | May 3, 2015 |
Eiichirō returns from Florida and is given a day off to adjust his body to the time difference. After the day off Eiichirō begins a new strict training regime to help him get ready for the Kanagawa Prefectural. On the way home one day, Eiichirō and Natsu talk about his time in Florida. In the spur of a moment, Eiichirō tries to confess his feelings, but they're interrupted by Takuma. As part of his training Coach Aoi forces Eiichirō to challenge Takuma to a match. At first Takuma refuses, but when Eiichirō admits he can never go pro unless he can find a way to defeat Takuma, Takuma agrees to the match. At first Eiichirō is overwhelmed by Takuma's serves. As the game goes along though Eiichirō begins to serve like Takuma, shocking Coach Aoi. Coach Aoi stops the match unexpectedly, upsetting both Eiichirō and Takuma.
| 6 | "First Encounter by Scouting"; Transliteration: "Teisatsu de Hatsu Souguu" (Japanese: 偵察で初遭遇) | May 10, 2015 |
Coach Aoi explains to Eiichirō that he stopped the match against Takuma because his body wasn't developed to serve like Takuma yet. If he had continued to serve that way, he would have injured himself and forced himself to give up his tennis career. In order to use his new weapon of serving Eiichirō is given strict training that will develop his arm muscles and increase his speed. At school the career counselors call for all seniors to determine their future careers, and Eiichirō lists his desire to go Pro, noting that he will turn to college if he doesn't win the All-Japan Junior.
| 7 | "Revenge at the Critical Moment"; Transliteration: "Shounenba no Ribenji" (Japanese: 正念場のリベンジ) | May 17, 2015 |
The Kanagawa Prefectural begins as Eiichirō faces off against Araya's new underclassman Nishimura. Araya has told Nishimura all of Eiichirō's weaknesses from the year before, making Nishimura very confident in his chances of winning. To counter this knowledge Eiichirō debuts his new serve and wins easily 6-0. Eiichirō then goes to scout Miyagawa, knowing he will be his second round opponent, but he arrives just in time to see the final point as Miyagawa wins 6-1, giving neither the knowledge of each other's growth in the past year.
| 8 | "The Speed of Evolution"; Transliteration: "Shinka no Supiido" (Japanese: 進化のスピーど) | May 24, 2015 |
Eiichirō and Miyagawa face off in the second round of the tournament for their second match. If Eiichirō loses he knows he'll lose all chance of going pro. If Miyagawa loses he knows his path to become a pro will take longer and might force him to go to college first. As the two face off both unveil their new weapons. For Eiichirō he unveils his dangerous serve while Miyagawa unveils some new counters that will force Eiichirō to adjust his data in unexpected ways. How many breaks can each get off of each other?
| 9 | "Baffled by Intuition"; Transliteration: "Kankaku de Konwaku" (Japanese: 感覚で困惑) | May 31, 2015 |
Coach Ryuhei Aoi decides to teach Eiichirō the importance of relying on instincts during a match instead of relying solely on data. In order to teach him how to play against a player who relies solely on instinct Eiichirō is forced to face off with Natsu. Eiichirō takes the words that he can play at full strength to hearts content though and starts using the data he's collected in his head to target all of Natsu's small weak points.
| 10 | "Start with a Roar"; Transliteration: "Otakebi de Start" (Japanese: 雄たけびでスタート) | June 7, 2015 |
Araya and Eiichirō begin their match in the Kanagawa Prefectural Final. At first both are holding serve and the score is at 3-3. However Coach Aoi realizes Eiichirō doesn't have the knowledge on how to deal with left handers since he's only played Araya once. Araya starts to target Eiichirō's backhand. To counter Eiichirō is forced to continually adjust his speed, making his center shots an easy target for Araya. Araya gets the first break and goes on to win set 1 6-3. However Eiichirō begins to return Araya's shots as the first set ends, making Araya realize Eiichirō is growing as fast as Ike previously did. Both realize they have to find a way to get massive breaks if they are to have any chance of winning.
| 11 | "Choices and Explosive Power"; Transliteration: "Sentakushi to Bakuhatsuryoku" (Japanese: 選択肢と爆発力) | June 14, 2015 |
Eiichirō throws out a couple of unexpected dropshots in set 2 and begins to alter the speed of his game. After trailing 30-love to begin match 2 of set 2 Eiichirō is able to rally with this new strategy and pull off a break. The break begins to build up Araya's frustrations, but instead of getting angry Araya yells at the sky and is able to calm down. Eiichirō stuns the crowd and wins set 2 6-3 to set up a third and final set. Araya acknowledges that Eiichirō's strategy is allowing him to address his weaknesses and actually get stronger as the game goes on. Over on the women's side Natsu easily wins the women's title 6-2, 6-0.
| 12 | "Full Force Toward Adversity"; Transliteration: "Gyakkyou ni Zenryoku" (Japanese: 逆境に全力) | June 21, 2015 |
Araya and Eiichirō prove to be even and are both unable to break each other's serve. Making things worse is there will be no tiebreaker., Instead an individual must win by 2 games. As set 3 continues Eiichirō begins to rely more and more on his instincts as his mind tires, and it begins to give Araya the slightest advantage. Eiichirō realizes if he doesn't break Araya when it is 6 all that he will likely tire and lose the match. Even that knowledge doesn't prove to be enough. Araya holds serve and goes up 7-6. Eiichirō then holds serve and evens it up at 7, but his mind completely wears itself out, and Araya goes on to win 9-7.
| 13 | "Gathering of Rivals"; Transliteration: "Rival ga Shuuketsu" (Japanese: ライバルが集結) | June 28, 2015 |
The gang begins their third and final year of high school in different classes. Eiichirō and Natsu both realize their classes seem to be moving on without them as they are getting ready for cram schools and entrance tests. STC has their own sort of ideas though. The top clubs in Japan have gotten together and decide to have their top players rotate between the top clubs. Included in the group is Eiichirō, and Natsu's top rival is also involved. The practices allow Eiichirō to focus on changing pace at all times and give him more experience. The bracket for the All Japan Junior is announced, and in order for Eiichirō to continue his goal he'll have to defeat the fifth seed. As the episode ends Takuma arrives back at STC. He had advanced to the Top 8 in Japan and is signing a bunch of contracts. Eiichirō challenges him to finish their match. Takuma agrees but points out he is headed overseas next week, so they'll have to do it as soon as the signings are done.
| 14 | "Moonlight and the Sound of Waves"; Transliteration: "Tsukiakari to Namioto" (Japanese: 月明かりと波音) | July 5, 2015 |
While Eiichiro loses against Takuma in the rematch, he gains recognition to the audience as he manages to fight back on Takuma's attacks using his change-of-pace strategy. The day before the Kanto Junior Tennis Tournament, Eiichiro and Natsu confess their feelings at the beach.
| 15 | "A Hero and Loud Cheers"; Transliteration: "Hīrō to Dai Kansei" (Japanese: ヒーローと大歓声) | July 12, 2015 |
Eiichiro easily manages to win the first round and as expected, he will face Ide on the next round. However, just as he is about to go for their match, he learns that Ide encounters an accident and decides to wait for Ide to arrive. At the match, he has to deal not only with Ide's skills but also, the cheers of the spectators.
| 16 | "Whish, Then Fwoom"; Transliteration: "Spa de Gyuun" (Japanese: スパッでギューン) | July 19, 2015 |
Eiichiro manages to take the lead at the first half of the first set. However, due to Ide's sharp intuition, his adaptation to Eiichiro's strategy is faster than expected. When he finally grasped the timing of Eiichiro's shots, he is starting to make a comeback.
| 17 | "Dramatic by Nature"; Transliteration: "Tensei to Dramatic" (Japanese: 天性でドラマチック) | July 26, 2015 |
Eiichiro wins the first set but Ide's attacks are getting better now. Due to the appearance of the child who Ide saved before and the audience's cheer, Eiichiro is starting to be overwhelmed by the pressure and loses the second set from Ide.
| 18 | "Visualize the Pressure"; Transliteration: "Puresshā wo Imēji" (Japanese: プレッシャーをイメージ) | August 2, 2015 |
Eiichiro decides to confront the pressure he had instead of simply ignoring it. It works, but as the match continues, the act of visualizing it is getting stressful for him. Turns out, leaving a certain percentage of the pressure is better and unconsciously leads him to a perfect balance of his reason and instinct. In the end, he wins against Ide in a close match. Rumours start circling about Eiichiro and Natsu after someone spotted them at the beach in episode 14.
| 19 | "A Rude First Meeting"; Transliteration: "Shitsurei ga Shotaimen" (Japanese: 失礼が初対面) | August 9, 2015 |
Eiichiro learns that he may have experienced the "zone" during his match against Ide. He also manages to win against Ono and now, he has to face Takagi, a strong player who seemed to have defeated Nabae before.
| 20 | "Psychological Warfare and Self-Control"; Transliteration: "Shinrisen to Jiseishin" (Japanese: 心理戦と自制心) | August 16, 2015 |
With Eiichiro's change-of-pace strategy and Takagi's utilization of tricks and high-level skills, the first set ends in a tiebreaker game.
| 21 | "Good, Evil and Rules"; Transliteration: "Zenaku to Kisoku" (Japanese: 善悪と規則) | August 23, 2015 |
Eiichiro tries to attack while releasing his anger but it becomes counterproductive. Realizing this mistake, Eiichiro takes some time to calm himself down and starts to confront the pressure, earning his win against Takagi's sly tricks. With this win, Eiichiro has the chance to revenge his loss against Nabae before.
| 22 | "Existence is the Driving Force"; Transliteration: "Sonzai ga Gendouryoku" (Japanese: 存在が原動力) | August 30, 2015 |
Natsu is also qualified for the semifinals after she managed to beat her opponent one-sidely. Before the match against Nabae, Eiichiro seems to be calmer and excited than usual, and during the match, he seems to be more aggressive than usual. Turns out, he seems to be closer to the zone.
| 23 | "Aggressive is Ideal"; Transliteration: "Sekkyokuteki de Risouteki" (Japanese: 積極的で理想的) | September 6, 2015 |
With Eiichiro being close to the zone, he gets the lead of the match from Nabae. However, as Eiichiro is starting to lose his best condition, Nabae starts attacking Eiichiro's critical shots.
| 24 | "Recklessness and Surprise"; Transliteration: "Mubou to Igaisei" (Japanese: 無謀と意外性) | September 13, 2015 |
Eiichiro wins the first set against Nabae but he is at Nabae's mercy during the second set. He tries to determine on how to return to the zone but this causes him to lose a set.
| 25 | "Final Set"; Transliteration: "Fainaru Setto" (Japanese: ファイナルセット) | September 20, 2015 |
Even though Eiichiro did all that he can do in the match, he still loses in the match against Nabae. However, instead of discouraging, he thinks of what he can do in the future in order to become stronger.
