= List of Rage of Bahamut episodes =

Rage of Bahamut (神撃のバハムート, Shingeki no Bahamut) is a Japanese anime television series produced by MAPPA that is based on the Rage of Bahamut game. The anime aired between October 6, 2014, and December 29, 2014, for 12 episodes. The opening theme song "EXiSTENCE" is performed by SiM, while the ending theme song "Promised Land" is performed by Risa Shimizu. On May 6, 2015, a second season was announced at the series' orchestra concert event. Titled Rage of Bahamut: Virgin Soul (神撃のバハムート VIRGIN SOUL, Shingeki no Bahamut: Virgin Soul), it aired between April 7, 2017, and September 29, 2017. For season 2, the first opening theme song is "LET iT END" by SiM while the first ending theme song is "Haikei Goodbye Sayonara" (拝啓グッバイさようなら; lit. Greetings, Goodbye, Farewell) by DAOKO. The second opening theme is "Walk This Way" by THE BEAT GARDEN, while the second ending theme is "Cinderella Step" by DAOKO.

== Episode list ==
=== Season 1: Genesis ===
No.	Title	Directed by	Written by	Original release date	Ref.
1	"Encounter Wytearp"	Kenji Mutō; Shinichi Matsumi	Keiichi Hasegawa	October 6, 2014	
After the epic battle against Bahamut who was sealed in stasis, the story jumps forward two thousand years to the present era of overall peace. The disgraced knight Kaisar Lidfald chases Leone Favaro the bounty hunter across the rooftops of Wytearp but cannot catch him. Outside town, a mysterious woman appears from the sky, asking how to get to Helheim. Meanwhile, Favaro Tracks down and kills Garth, a demon-summoning criminal, collects his bounty from Bacchus and Hansa, and celebrates at the local town's tavern. The mysterious woman overhears Favaro boasting about knowing a shortcut to Helheim and asks for his help to get there. He demands a kiss for the information, but Garth's older brother Ghos appears and summons a gigantic demon. Favaro is saved by the mysterious woman who transforms to reveal demonic powers. She easily overwhelms the huge demon while Favaro takes out Ghos. Favaro is hit by falling debris and passes out as the demon woman appears to kiss him. Favaro has a vision that he is in the demon world and then awakens at an inn where he is suddenly declared a "demon" as he now has a tail.
2	"Escape of Levian"	Atsushi Wakabayashi	Keiichi Hasegawa	October 13, 2014	
Favaro tries to cut off his tail with no success. The mysterious woman declares she placed a spell on Favaro which she will only remove after he reveals the shortcut to Helhiem. Because Favaro lied, he promises to show her the way and they leave town after stealing Kaisar's horse. Later, the Knights of Jeanne D'Arc led by Lavalley appear, searching for a demon and the God Key. Kaiser, assumes the demon is Favaro and declares he will capture it, but he is quickly dismissed as a lowly bounty hunter instead of being respected as a knight. Favaro travels with the demon woman, whose name is Amira, collecting another bounty on the way as she learns about human culture while they are still followed by Kaisar. They arrive in Livian and the Knights appear, looking for a female demon with one wing. Favaro seizes the chance to betray Amira in the hope that killing her will release her spell on him. However he is led by the horse to rescue Amira and the knights chase them onto a bridge. Lavalley hesitates to attack when he sees Amira has a ruby jewel like the one he has, and the two fugitives jump into the river below. Amira then asks Favaro if he is a liar, but he avoids answering. Bounties are then placed on their heads.
3	"Fog of Nebelville"	Kim Dong Jun; Shinichi Matsumi	Akira Tanizaki	October 20, 2014	
With the God Key taken from sacred ground, the boundaries between godkind and demonkind has begun to crumble. Favaro and Amira continue their way toward Helheim but detour for a bounty to earn more funds for their journey. Meanwhile Kaisar becomes lost in a forest, but is found by a girl called Rita and taken to Nebelville. Amira tells Favaro about "the incident" when she stole the God Key by absorbing its soul into herself. The punishment resulted in her losing one of her wings, leaving her flightless. Kaisar's rescuers implore him to help in dispatching monsters plaguing the town. Kaisar warms to the doctor's daughter, Rita, recalling his upbringing as a knight and the disaster that befell his family. Upon confronting the monsters it is revealed that they are Favaro and Amira and Kaisar was duped by an illusion. The village really is rundown and inhabited by zombies commanded by Rita who is really a necromancer. She and has controlled the town for the past 200 years, but is bitten by her zombie parents and Favaro and Amira collect the bounty on the demon inhabiting her book. Kaisar is unwilling to decapitate Rita as she is still alive, and then she follows him.
4	"Reunion at Ysmenport"	Kenji Mutō; Shinichi Matsumi	Keiichi Hasegawa	October 27, 2014	
Amira and Favaro arrive in Ysmenport where he finds the ship Celephales. It is captained by Amon who turns out to be an old acquaintance of Favaro and his father Barossa who was a bandit chief. Meanwhile Kaisar continues his pursuit of Favaro with Rita tagging along on the ship Dagonia. Kaisar tells Rita that he and Favaro were childhood friends but Favaro's father used information to sabotage Kaisar's father's mission causing the release of a demon which led to their destruction and the downfall of the Lidfard family. Suddenly, the Dagonia crew attack Kaisar and Rita, but are no match for the knight and the zombie necromancer. At the same time, a giant crab, the Shipwrecker, appears and wreaks havoc on the Celephales, but Amira changes to her demon form and defeats it. Amon reveals to Favaro that he had a pact with a demon and planned the downfall of both Kaisar and Favaro's fathers. The Dagonia then crashes into the Celephales, unleashing Rita's zombie pirates on Amon's henchmen and Amon is eaten by the Shipwrecker. As Kaisar confronts Favaro, a giant tentacle descends from the sky capturing Amira and Kaisar who attempts to protect her, leaving Favaro and Rita behind.
5	"Rescue in Sword Valley"	Shinichi Matsumi; Yoshihide Ibata	Akira Tanizaki	November 3, 2014	
In the holy land of Abos, Heaven's forces try to maintain the barrier around Bahamut as it begins to crumble. Far below, Favaro and Rita chase the demons who captured Amira and Kaisar, although Favaro would rather leave them. In the demon Azazel's floating fortress Amira is tortured for information about the God's Key while Kaisar watches on helplessly. Rita and Favaro borrow the god Bacchus' flying carriage after Favaro proves his commitment by breaking his bounty hunter's band, making him an ordinary outlaw. The two then manage to break into the fortress but become separated when Azazel goads Kaisar into fighting Favaro although Rita quickly breaks up the fight. Outside, Jeanne d'Arc's Knights charge the demon fortress, causing a diversion which allows Favaro, Rita and Kaisar to rescue Amira, only to end up before Azazel. Favaro realizes Azazel is the demon responsible for his father's death. When Azazel attacks Amira a mysterious force within her sends him tumbling below although he now realizes who is behind Amira's quest.
6	"Anatae, Part 1: Legendary Saint"	Masashi Abe; Shinichi Matsumi	Keiichi Hasegawa	November 10, 2014	
In the demon capital of Cocytus, Azazel seeks an audience with the demon clan's leader Lord Lucifer but is sent away instead to capture the God Key. Favaro and the rest of his group are captured by knights and taken before the King in Anatae when three angels appear. They confirm that Amira is half angel and half demon and proclaim Amira, Favaro, Kaisar and Rita and must be kept safe to foil the demons who are trying to revive Bahamut. They are permitted freedom within the capital but cannot leave, although Amira insists Favaro take her to Helheim as he promised, but he refuses. The angel clan schemes to use Amira to their advantage as her emotional state is tied to the God Key for which she is now the vessel. Amira is lured from her room by a cloaked figure who possesses the same pendant as her, leaving her to wonder about his true identity. Favaro encounters Jeanne who explains Bahamut's original sealing and the legendary knight, a saint, who will be the one to seal Bahamut again. At the same time Azazel prepares his attack on the city.
6.5	"Roundup"	N/A	N/A	November 17, 2014	
A recap of all previous episodes. It shows Amira stealing the God Key after being promised what she most desired if she took it, meeting Favaro and how Kaisar met Rita, being abducted by demons while at sea, how they came together as a team in the demons' fortress, escaping and then ending up in the human capital.
7	"Anatae, Part 2: The Storm Rages"	Takashi Ikari; Tomoyuki Kurokawa	Masanao Akahoshi	November 24, 2014	
Azazel's demon legion descends on the city to claim the God Key while the humans go on the defense, but The King's forces fight a losing battle against the demons. A happy Amira appears before Favaro, claiming she just met her father. She then happily Gorges herself inside the kitchen while Favaro, Kaisar and Rita attempt to solicit information about her father from her. Azazel infiltrates the castle, leaving carnage behind as he seeks Amira who has now passed out. He taunts Kaisar about his father's death admitting his involvement, but Favaro takes the blame and challenges Azazel, buying time for Kaisar to hide Amira and the God Key. Eventually Kaisar returns to aid Favaro and Azazel reveals he is actually the killer of both their fathers. Kaisar recklessly charges Azazel to buy time for Jeanne who charges up her sacred spear Maltet and delivers a decisive blow to the distracted Azazel. With Azazel defeated, the tide of battle changes and the humans regain control. Favaro saves Kaisar from falling to his death, but when Rita goes back to collect Amira, she finds her missing.
8	"Anatae, Part 3: Beyond the Storm"	Kim Dong Jun; Shinichi Matsumi	Keiichi Hasegawa	December 1, 2014	
Amira sees the statue of Bahamut, triggering a vision of the beast being freed. Meanwhile, the angels decide that Jeanne is worthy of becoming a Holy Knight to defeat Bahamut if he awakes. Amira tells the others how she was given her necklace by an unknown figure, promising to fulfill her dream in Helheim. The King summons the group and Amira identifies Jeanne D'Arc's lieutenant Lavalley as her father. The King then knights Favaro and Kaisar who is ecstatic to have his honor restored, while the angels grant Jeanne another holy weapon, the sword Precieuse. The injured Azazel confronts Belzebuth about scheming behind Lucifer's back, but Belzebuth incinerates Azazel, revealing that he's planning Judgement Day. The jealous King is tricked into thinking Jeanne is plotting his death after she is favored by the gods over him. That night Favaro and Rita take Amira to see her father, Lavalley. He reveals that Amira is half angel and half demon, that her mother is the angel Nicole and he is not her real father, but her human bodyguard. The demons kidnapped Amira when she was a baby and accelerated her growth, making her an adult in only 5 years. Amira was then duped into stealing the God Key and told her mother was in Helheim, but he uses the twin pendents reveal Nicole's true location, in Prudisia, the Valley of the Demons.
9	"Decision in the Wailing Woods"	Fumio Itō; Shinichi Matsumi	Akira Tanizaki	December 8, 2014	
Amira and Favaro leave the city and secretly task Kaisar to aid them. Meanwhile, Jeanne is framed by an unknown demon for attempting to murder the king, including slaughtering his guards and the officer Gaurin. The Angels continue their struggle to maintain the seal on Bahamut as it grows increasingly unstable. Kaisar finds Amira and Favaro in a forest where they are transported to an alternate space. Favoro frees an imprisoned dragon by removing a poisonous barb of Bahamut and the dragon reveals that when Amira's key meets the seal, Bahamut will be released and the world will be destroyed. Meanwhile, Belzebuth causes the gods and demons to mass their forces to crush each other. Seeing Amira's distress at her destiny, Favaro resolves to change her fate. Meanwhile, the King orders the death of Jeanne by burning at the stake while beneath the castle Rita investigates the cause of madness and trickery. The trio arrive in Prudisia, but Favaro is troubled because the dragon told him that the only way to prevent the God Key fusing with Bahamut is to kill Amira.
10	"Helheim, Land of Lies"	Atsushi Wakabayashi; Masashi Abe; Tomoyuki Kurokawa	Keiichi Hasegawa	December 15, 2014	
Rita escapes from the cloaked demon in the castle while the King proceeds to burn Jeanne D'Arc at the stake before a crowd of citizens who proclaim her innocence. As Jeanne burns, she is abandoned by her patron angel. She accepts the offer of the cloaked demon and is converted from a saint into a witch and escapes as a demon. Meanwhile, as the trio continue their journey to find Amira's mother, they are intercepted by the cloaked demon, revealed as Amira's mentor Martinet, who tells them they are really in Helheim, not Prudisia. Rita seeks out Bacchus and inquires about the cloaked demon then they encounter the severely injured Azazel who later agrees to help Rita if she takes him to Abos. The demon lord Belzebuth appears before the trio, capturing Kaisar and Favaro, and telling Amira to fulfill her purpose before he shows her mother, Nichole. Martinet reveals he created Amira from Nicole as a tool to release Bahamut and all Amira's memories are fabricated. Amira's compromised emotional state causes the key's seal to unlock, falling into the demon's hands as the completed Transcendent Key. Favaro then pretends to join the demons but Martinet sees through the ploy and forcibly turns Favaro into a demon.
11	"All Roads Lead to Abos"	Hiroshi Takeuchi	Masanao Akahoshi	December 22, 2014	
Belzebuth and Martinet prepare Amira for transportation and blast Kaisar who falls into the depths below. The angel clan attempt to maintain the seal on Bahamut while sensing the presence of the Transcendent Key. Meanwhile, Azazel tells Rita and Bacchus that Belzebuth and Martinet are behind Amira's actions. While protecting the seal the angels are attacked by the demon Jeanne who slays Raphael and Uriel before going after Michael. Kaisar is saved by Bacchus in his flying carriage who is then attacked by Jeanne. While Bacchus fights Jeanne, Rita attempts to administer the last of the antidotes to Jeanne but fails only for Michael to successfully give it to Jeanne, sealed with a kiss after she impales him. Jeanne is freed, turning back into a saint while Michael's physical form disappears. As Belzebuth prepares to destroy the angels protecting Bahamut's barrier, Azazel attacks him seeking revenge. Kaisar duels with the demonic Favaro and shoots him in the chest. Amira emerges from the Transcendent Key's orb, now with angels' wings. With the barrier fallen Bahamut begins to absorb Amira while everyone looks on helplessly. As Kaisar watches in disbelief Lavalley shoves him over the edge of the flying fortress before celebrating as Bahamut awakens.
12	"Rage of Bahamut"	Akihiko Yamashita	Keiichi Hasegawa	December 29, 2014	
Belzebuth rejoices in Bahamut's awakening, but Bahamut responds by destroying Belzebuth and then proceeding to blast everything in sight, gods, demons and humans. Rita saves the falling Kaisar and reveals that Lavalley is really Gilles de Rais, a sorcerer with a bounty, and the one behind Bahamut's revival. Kaisar attempts to attack Lavalley and finds that he is Martinet as well. Elsewhere, Azazel finishes off Belzebuth, extracting his revenge. Favaro begins combat Kaisar, but Favaro appears to gain the upper hand and cuts off Kaisar's forearm with the bounty armband attached. Kaisar quickly recites the incantation turning Lavalley into a bounty tablet. Rita tends to Kaisar's wounds while Favaro reveals that the fight was an act and that Kaisar shot him with an arrow containing the antidote, turning him back to normal. Favaro declares that he must kill Amira to stop the beast and Kaisar decides to join him, but still hoping to save her life. The demons and angels work together to contain the beast, allowing Favaro and Kaisar to approach it on Hamsa's back. With tears in his eyes Favaro stabs Bahamut with the claw he pulled from the dragon earlier. Amira then appears before him and they reconcile before she kisses Favaro and disappears back inside Bahamut, causing the beast to explode. Hamsa saves Kaisar, but Favaro is caught in the blast which destroys part of his leg. Half a year later in the royal capital Kaisar has a mechanical hand created by Rita and commands the soldiers as a lieutenant with his knighthood intact. Favaro is alive with a mechanical right leg and is back to bounty hunting, though he cautions that Bahamut is not gone forever and may return someday. Kaisar suddenly joins him, forsaking his military duties, and the two ride off together.

=== Season 2: Virgin Soul ===
No.	Title	Episode animation by	Screenplay by	Original release date	Ref.
1	"Red Dragon"	Kōji Sawai	Shizuka Ōishi	April 8, 2017	
Ten years after Bahamut's sealing, the humans under the rule of King Charioce XVII use their gigantic golems and forbidden powers to enslave the demons and attack the gods themselves. In retaliation, a vigilante demon known only as the Rag Demon is on the loose killing those involved with oppressing the demons. Meanwhile, Nina Drango goes to Anatae and takes on odd jobs to make a living. She meets Bacchus and is given the task of capturing the last remaining bounty, the Rag Demon. Under orders of the king, Captain Kaisar Lidfard sets a trap for the Rag Demon and recognizes him as Azazel. Nina accidentally hits Kaisar and is then attacked by his Orleans Knights, but she is rescued by Azazel. Effected by Azazel's good looks, she transforms into the red dragon and destroys much of the city, defeating the Orleans Knights and their golems. The next day, Nina wakes up in Bacchus' wagon greeted by Rita.
2	"The Miserables"	Shinji Satoh; Naoki Matsuura	Shizuka Ōishi	April 15, 2017	
Rita introduces herself and her assistant hand, Rocky, to Nina who writes back home to Dragon's village about her life in Anatae. After Kaisar and the Orleans Knights fail to capture Azazel, the king assigns the Onyx Knights to capture him instead. Later, Azazel approaches Nina and asks her to join forces with him. He tells her how five years earlier King Charioce XVII raided the Demon's capital Cocytus, enslaving the demons and showing her the slums where the demons live, but she refuses to join him. That night, when Azazel is murdering slave owners, Kaisar confronts him, but Azazel shows him how humans brutally treat demons, leading Kaisar to question his loyalty to Charioce. However the scene is witnessed by an Onyx Knight, and Azazel is then ambushed and captured by Onyx Knights. However, he is rescued by Mugaro who can nullify the effects of the power within the knights' armor. On hearing about the encounter, Charioce gives orders for the Rag Demon and Mugaro to be killed.
3	"Close Encounter"	Hiroshi Takeuchi	Shizuka Ōishi	April 22, 2017	
The angels detect Mugaro's power and Sofiel descends from heaven to look for the child El who is known as Mugaro in Anatae. Nina continues her life in the city and participates in an arm wrestling match organized by Hamsa. She wins easily until a handsome man arrives to challenge her. Nina wrestles him blindfolded to concentrate and only just wins the match, however the strong stranger leaves without leaving his name. Back in the palace, Charioce sets a trap for the Rag Demon by threatening to publicly kill demons. That night, Nina enjoys a feast with Rita and Bacchus, and reveals to their astonishment that her mentor was Favaro. When Kaisar arrives to tell Rita and her friends that Azazel is in danger, Nina immediately rushes off to save him, but Azazel has already sprung the trap laid for him.
4	"Firestarter"	Atsushi Wakabayashi	Shizuka Ōishi	April 29, 2017	
The Rag Demon arrives to confront Charioce, but he is defeated by powerful sorcery and retreats after revealing his true identity as Azazel. Later, Nina finds Azazel injured and after revealing the secret to her transformation, she changes into the red dragon to challenge Charioce's army. Kaisar intercedes to save the king and Nina goes on a rampage defeating the knights and destroying more of the city before returning to her human form when she is retrieved by Rita and Bacchus. The next day, Kaisar is interrogated by the king about his relationship with Azazel, but Charioce doesn't believe his answer. Charioce visits Jeanne in prison, asking her to join his cause in defeating the demons and battling the gods, but when she refuses, he taunts her about killing her son, El. Shortly after Azazel recovers, he goes to the demon's hideout to plot an uprising against Charioce.
5	"Those Who Won't Give Up"	Kazuhisa Ohno	Shizuka Ōishi	May 6, 2017	
Azazel explains to the demons that his plan is to strike during the upcoming parade using the red dragon. Meanwhile, Nina goes clothes shopping with Mugaro thinking that he is a girl, much to his amusement. When they see a trader using a magical collars to abuse his demon slaves, Nina intervenes and Mugaro using the power of his eye to remove them. Mugaro's action is detected by Sofiel, but they leave before she arrives. The Orleans Knights, Alessand Visponti and Dias Bardolomew, discuss Kaisar's strange behavior over lunch while Kaisar unburdens his concerns to Rita about his conflicted role within the Orleans Knights and concern for the plight of the demons. Sofiel tells Bacchus about her search for the child El, not recognizing El (Mugaro) who is with Nina as they pass her. That night, Charioce and Kaisar discuss Charioce's quest for control over the gods and demons. Kaisar points out that Bahamut was defeated because humans, demons, and gods worked together, but Charioce is unconvinced. That night Bacchus and Hamsa realize that Mugaro is the child El that Sofiel is searching for.
6	"Anatean Holiday"	Daisuke Nishimiya; Atsushi Wakabayashi	Shizuka Ōishi	May 13, 2017	
While Nina helps prepare for a food stand at the festival, she encounters the slave-owning trader again, however the handsome arm wrestler intervenes and chases them off. He introduces himself as Chris, but he is actually Charioce in disguise. That evening, Bacchus asks Chris to take Nina around the festival where Nina begins to develop feelings for him and they dance together. Afterwards, Nina asks Chris to dance with her again, but he is unable to promise anything. With her lust for Chris at a critical point, Nina runs off and bumps into Azazel, who demands that she meet him tomorrow at the parade. The following day, the parade begins while Azazel and the demons prepare to attack.
7	"The Day of Victory"	Kazuhisa Ohno	Shizuka Ōishi	May 20, 2017	
Before the parade begins, Kaisar warns Charioce not to attend due to the possibility of a demon attack, but Charioce decides to use the parade to another opportunity to catch Azazel. Sofiel again meets up with Bacchus and Hamsa and becomes suspicious of Mugaro's true identity. The parade begins and shortly thereafter the demon attack begins. Azazel grabs Nina and hugs her, hoping to force her to transform into the red dragon but without success. Azazel then tries to call off the rebellion, but the demons have been discovered so they attack Charioce and his knights. However without the red dragon they are outnumbered and are beaten back. Azazel appears in the midst of the battle in a desperate attempt to rescue the surviving demons.
8	"The Day of Defeat"	Mihiro Yamaguchi	Shizuka Ōishi	May 27, 2017	
With Azazel and the demons in trouble, Mugaro activates the power from his eye to neutralize the knights while Azazel attacks Charioce. Kaisar tries to stop the fight and he beats the weakened Azazel to the ground, then stops Charioce from killing Azazel. Charioce attempts to kill Kaisar who uses his false left hand to protect himself from a fatal blow. Sofiel and the angels capture and take Mugaro, Bacchus and Hamsa to heaven. Later, Mugaro is told that his real name is El, that he is Jeanne's son and his power to neutralize human magic could restore the gods to their former position. Meanwhile, Azazel screams for Nina to transform into the red dragon but she cannot do it. Nina and Kaisar are then arrested and charged with treason, with Nina shouting to the assembled forces that Charioce is unfit to be the king. They are taken to an impregnable island prison where they reunite with Jeanne and Favaro. Meanwhile Azazel is tortured to extract what information he has.
9	"Same Old, Same Old"	Koji Sawai; Akitoshi Yokoyama	Shizuka Ōishi	June 3, 2017	
In prison, Nina remains cheerful as ever despite the poor working conditions. Favaro tells Kaisar about his relationship with Nina and how he was arrested. He tells how he visited Nina's dragon village to spend the reward money from his 300th bounty and Nina was so impressed by his track record, she aggressively pressured him to make her his apprentice. During her training, Favoro accidentally learned about Nina's ability to transform into the red dragon. At the end of the apprenticeship, Favaro tells Nina to visit Bacchus in Anatae for bounty work. However, in the next town he was arrested by the Onyx Knights after being sold out by the dragon ladies. Meanwhile, Nina tells Jeanne about Mugaro whom Jeanne suspects is her son, causing her to want to escape and meet him. Meanwhile, Rita heads towards the prison to rescue her friends.
10	"The Way She Was"	Takashi Kobayashi	Shizuka Ōishi	June 10, 2017	
Jeanne explains her past to Nina, starting with losing the divine power she had as a saint and failing to save the life of a child being attacked by a demon. She fell from grace after refusing to support the new King Charioce XVII in his quest to challenge the gods and his plan to create a new world for humanity. Jeanne then moved to the outskirts of the capital to become a farmer where she gave birth to El through Michael's blessing. One day, Sofiel arrived at Jeanne's home pursued by the Onyx Knights. Jeanne refused to hand her over, so the knights assaulted Jeanne and suddenly El's neutralizing power was activated. They fled to Anatae where Jeanne cut off El's wings enabling him live among the demons while she was soon captured and incarcerated. Motivated by their desires to see Mugaro, Nina and Jeanne decide to escape from prison even though nobody had ever succeeded.
11	"Declaration of War"	Takashi Kobayashi	Shizuka Ōishi	June 17, 2017	
Nina and Jeanne prepare to break out of prison. In Heaven, Gabriel pressures El to aid them with the promise of seeing his mother again and restoring his wings and voice. Rita arrives at the prison and forces her way in where she learns that the prisoners' work are part of Charioce's scheme. Sofiel and Gabriel descend from heaven and demand that Charioce releases Jeanne from prison, however he refuses, demanding the gods try to take her by force. Seeing this, El agrees to correct mankind and rescue his mother. Within the prison, Nina and Jeanne make it to the exit, but the escape attempt fails with Charioce's unexpected appearance. Nina then realizes that Charioce is the man she met at the festival who called himself Chris.
12	"The Great Escape"	Kiyoshi Matsuda	Shizuka Ōishi	June 24, 2017	
The gods prepare for war against Charioce's army, while within Anatae, opposition to the coming war increases. With Rita's help this time, Nina and Jeanne make another escape attempt, landing in a mine cart and ride away while being pursued by guards, managing to get away after it flies off the tracks. Meanwhile, the gods descend and prepare to attack Charioce's army which responds with the Onyx Knights who are neutralized by El's power. In the prison, Kaisar explodes his prosthetic hand to escape from his cell and escapes with Favaro. They mett up with Nina, Jeanne, and Rita, however after a brief reunion, they become separated when Charioce's ultimate weapon that was being built by the prisoners emerges from below.
13	"A Farewell to Arms"	Atsushi Wakabayashi	Shizuka Ōishi	July 1, 2017	
With the appearance of Charioce's weapon of mass destruction called Dromos, the soldiers of heaven are ordered to retreat, but they refuse. Now out of prison and onto Dromos, the five friends find themselves in the middle of a battlefield. Charioce activates Dromos and fires a shot at the gods and their army, bringing them down to the surface. The recoil causes Nina to fly towards him and she witness the Onyx Knights attacking her friends. She asks Charioce to hug her, causing her to transform into the red dragon. As the red dragon, Nina draws the attention of Charioce's army, and then fights and defeats a golem powered by Dromos. Following the battle, Favaro disappears, Kaisar is recaptured while Nina, Jeanne, and Rita are rescued by the Hippogriff pulling Bacchus' flying wagon and head towards Nina's home village.
14	"Homecoming"	Kazuhisa Ohno	Shizuka Ōishi	July 8, 2017	
Dias visits Kaisar in prison, who entrusts him with leading the Orleans Knights. Nina returns to her home village with Jeanne who is introduced to an ancient elder that she calls grandmother who helped fight the Bahamut whom Jeanne asks to take her to the land of the gods. In a quiet moment while waiting for a reply, the two women discuss relationships, and Jeanne suggests that Nina's love for the man she met and danced with may be genuine even if he has done things Nina disagrees with. The next day, the elder transforms into a dragon and carries Nina and Jeanne towards the land of the gods.
15	"City of the Gods, Part 1"	Kiyoshi Matsuda; Mihiro Yamaguchi	Shizuka Ōishi	July 15, 2017	
In the best interest for the survival of demons, Lucifer decides to take no action against the humans. Meanwhile, Azazel is sent to a colosseum to fight other demons in tournaments. Nina and Jeanne arrive in the land of the gods and are escorted to the palace by Ridwan the angel. On the way, they are shown the place where fallen gods only exist as moving lights, and Nina realizes how much they sacrificed fighting Bahamut and in the recent assault by humans and understands why Charioce XVII is so hated. Meanwhile on the island of Eibos, Charioce inspects the construction to break the seal holding Bahamut. Back in Heaven, Jeanne and El are reunited, and Nina is overjoyed to see the boy she has known as Mugaro. El tells his mother Jeanne how he was sold as a demon slave, his voice being damaged and then rescue by Azazel who named him Mugaro. El decides to return to the surface world to bring peace and fix the errors of humanity, however Gabriel disagrees and forbids him to go.
16	"City of the Gods, Part 2"	Kunihiro Mori	Shizuka Ōishi	July 22, 2017	
During the night, El exchanges clothes with Nina while she sleeps. After they discover the switch, Nina and Bacchus find El by the Hippogriff carriages, but fail to capture him. Meanwhile, Kaisar is accused of treason and sentenced to fight Azazel in the colosseum. Favaro suddenly appears in the crowd and throws Kaisar's hand to him, enabling him to even the odds and fight back against Azazel, much to the crowd's disapproval. Favaro jumps into the arena, helping them to escape by throwing smoke bombs. Back in Heaven, Nina chases down the fleeing Mugaro, but they fall together through the dangerous dark storm barrier. To escape punishment for losing El, Bacchus flies down after them in his carriage, and they make it back safely to the surface world. Back in Anatae, Kaisar convinces Azazel to form an alliance to defeat Charioce.
17	"Virgin Souls"	Harume Kosaka	Shizuka Ōishi	July 29, 2017	
Nina and her friends are reunited with Favoro and Kaisar in the slums of Anatae. Meanwhile, Sofiel agrees to help Jeanne return to Earth to find her son El. Disguised as a demon, Nina encounters Charioce dressed as Chris in the graveyard. He explains that he is the son of a commoner who was one of the king's concubines, but she was killed during the battle against Bahamut ten years ago. Because of his royal blood he was given the name Charioce XVII and became the next king. Nina takes him on a tour through the demon slums, where he befriends a group of children. He also explains that the Dromos and the demon genocide are for a purpose that he wants to achieve at all costs, and promises to reveal his intentions when they next meet. They declare their love for each other, and after they kiss, Nina realizes that she can transform into the red dragon at will. She takes him on a flight over the city, but are seen by the Onyx Knights.
18	"Invictus"	Takashi Kobayashi	Shizuka Ōishi	August 19, 2017	
The group of allies decide they must remove Charioce's bracelet which controls of the weapon Dromos. While discussing their plan to infiltrate an upcoming royal ball, Nina reveals that she can now transform into the red dragon at will, much to Azazel's disgust. Charioce orders work to continue on powering up Dromos while the Onyx Knights hire a mercenary to kill the red dragon while Azazel takes El to visit the site of the failed demon rebellion. Meanwhile, Kaisar works undercover as a waiter to meet with Alessand and Dias to arrange entry to the royal ball.
19	"Shall We Dance?"	Atsushi Wakabayashi	Shizuka Ōishi	August 26, 2017	
Alessand and Nina infiltrate the ball with Rita observing the events from a distance. Brazenly, Nina approaches Charioce asking to dance, but after the dance, he takes her onto the balcony and tells her that they will not see each other again and the promise to tell her about his true intentions was a lie. Favaro arrives to get the bracelet, but he learns that it is not possible to remove it without killing Charioce. Nina stops Favaro from killing Charioce who then uses a smoke bomb to escape with Nina, their plan a failure. They reach the port with Kaisar, but are trapped by the Onyx Knights accompanied by the mercenary.
20	"From Heaven to Hell"	Kiyoshi Matsuda	Shizuka Ōishi	September 2, 2017	
The mercenary is revealed to also be a dragon folk as both he and Nina transform into dragons, but she is overpowered and returns to her human form. At the critical moment, Jeanne and Sofiel arrive with Azazel to defeat the mercenary dragon and escape. Sofiel explains to the group of allies that Dromos is an ancient magical weapon that the gods sealed away after not being able to unravel its secrets. El agrees to return to the land of the gods, tearfully leaving Azazel while Bacchus and Sofiel decide to stay until they figure out Charioce's true intentions. As El prepares to leave, Alessand appears and stabs him in an attempt to prove his worth to the Onyx Knights.
21	"Vengeance"	Hirokazu Yamada	Shizuka Ōishi	September 9, 2017	
Favaro sees Alessand passing by after killing El, and he takes El back to their hideout. Rita is unable to save El, so with her son dead, Jeanne decides to return to the land of the gods with Sofiel. Azazel returns to hell, swearing vengeance on Alessand and Charioce. Meanwhile, Alessand asks again to join the Onyx Knights having proved himself by killing El, but he has second thoughts after being told that a green stone must be implanted in his body which will grant him power in exchange for draining his life force. Elsewhere, Dias agrees to join the Kaisar in his battle to thwart the king's plans. In the land of the gods, Jeanne is given the power of an angel and vows to kill Charioce. In hell, Azazel tries to goad Lucifer into attacking Charioce, but Lucifer is unwilling to accommodate his request as survival of the demon race takes priority and because of the failure of Azazel's demon rebellion. Back in Anatae, Nina is finally able to express the sadness she feels for El whom she knew as Mugaro and sets out for Eibos, vowing to stop Charioce. Jeanne publicly declares war on Charioce's army, calling for all who support her to take up arms and join the rebellion.
22	"Which Way Is the Wind Blowing?"	Takashi Kobayashi	Shizuka Ōishi	September 16, 2017	
Jeanne assembles an army of demons, humans, and angels and prepares to march against the king. As she leads the army, she meets Kaiser and Dias who tell Jeanne that Alessand alone was responsible her son's death. She replies that the king still targeted El, the holy child, and proceeds to launch an attack on Anatae. Meanwhile, Nina and Favaro arrive at Eibos where Charioce is readying the ancient device. As Charioce prepares to activate the Dromos using the green stone embedded in his wrist band, Nina arrives and confronts Charioce. However, she is unwilling to sever his hand to remove the bracelet. The king's old adviser explains that Charioce was chosen as the one to slay Bahamut. Favoro deduces that it is Charioce's intention to revive the Bahamut and then slay it, even at the cost of his own life. As the device explodes, Nina and Favaro escape and look on as Bahamut awakens.
23	"Rise of the Nightmare"	Atsushi Wakabayashi; Hirokazu Yamada; Tomoyuki Kurokawa	Shizuka Ōishi	September 23, 2017	
After taking the castle at Anatae, Jeanne realizes that Charioce is on Eibos and launches an attack on the island. Just as Lucifer arrives in his airborne warship with Azazel, they find the island heavily defended by the Onyx Knights. Meanwhile, Kaisar and Dias encounter Orleans Knights about to kill some demon children, but Dias sees Alessand running away and gives chase. Dias catches Alessand who acts remorseful, but after unsuccessfully trying to stab Dias, Alessand runs again and is fatally stabbed by a demon child, much to his surprise. Jeanne and Azazel reach Charioce's flying warship and encounter the Onyx Knights. However, having been pushed to their limit by their embedded green stones, the knights fall dead. Meanwhile, Rita uses necromancy to animate human corpses as a bridge for Kaisar to reach Charioce's airship. With Charioce left alone, Jeanne and Azazel unleash a powerful attack on him, but Kaisar intercepts it instead, sacrificing himself to save the king.
24	"Run, Nina, Run"	Kiyoshi Matsuda	Shizuka Ōishi	September 30, 2017	
The resurrected Bahamut again launches a devastating attack on anything in its path. Meanwhile, after Nina carries Favaro and Bacchus to safety, Favaro asks whether she chooses the world or Charioce, and Nina answers Charioce. Kaisar dies, and Azazel and Jeanne allow Charioce carry out his plan to kill Bahamut. The gods and demons form a protective barrier while Nina joins Charioce to fire the Dromos to destroy Bahamut. In the aftermath of the battle, the survivors rejoice. Nina and Charioce survive the explosion, although Charioce loses his eyesight and Nina loses her voice. Charioce then continues to rule Anatae where humans and demons are now accepted as equals. Nina works on the reconstruction, while Dias takes over as captain of the Orleans Knights and Rita has turns Kaisar into a zombie. Before Favaro leaves Anatae to continue his journey as a wanderer, Nina reveals that she met Amira just as Bahamut was being defeated. Nina and Charioce eventually find happiness together even though he cannot see her, and she cannot speak to him.
