= Kids Street =

American pay television network

Kids Street/Family Central Explorer
- Country: United States
- Broadcast area: United States
- Headquarters: Miami, Florida

Programming
- Languages: English; Spanish

Ownership
- Owner: 2042 Media USA, LLC

History
- Launched: January 16, 2017; 9 years ago
- Former names: Kids Central (2016 - 2020); Spanish Version: Kids Central En Español Family Central Explorer: Family Central (2016 - 2020/21)

Kids Street is an American pay television channel operated by 2042 Media USA, LLC aimed at the 3-to-7-year-old Latino market in the United States.

== History ==
The channel launched on Comcast Xfinity systems on January 16, 2017.

The channel operates an evening/late night block aimed at older audiences called Family Central Explorer. All programming aired on Kids Street is offered in English with Spanish available as a secondary audio program.

In September 2020, the channel changed its name to Kids Street.
