= List of Nippon Professional Baseball players (W) =

The following is a list of Nippon Professional Baseball players with the last name starting with W, retired or active.

== W ==
Name	Debut	Final Game	Position	Teams	Ref
Kazuhiro Wada					
Takashi Wada					
Tsuyoshi Wada					
Yutaka Wada					
Hiroyasu Wakabayashi					
Tadashi Wakabayashi					
Takanobu Wakabayashi					
Motoyasu Wakai					
Tsutomu Wakamatsu					
Kenichi Wakatabe					
Ryuji Wakatake					
Koji Wakisaka					
Ryota Wakiya					
Hideaki Wakui					
Pete Walker					
Brian Warren					
John Wasdin					
Takashi Watabe					
Hideaki Watanabe					
Hidekazu Watanabe					
Hiroshi Watanabe					
Hiroyuki Watanabe					
Hisanobu Watanabe					
Koki Watanabe					
Masahiro Watanabe					
Masahito Watanabe					
Masakazu Watanabe (baseball)					
Masato Watanabe					
Naoto Watanabe					
Nobuhiko Watanabe					
Ryo Watanabe (pitcher)					
Ryo Watanabe (infielder)					
Ryuichi Watanabe					
Shunsuke Watanabe					
Tairiku Watanabe					
Takao Watanabe					
Tomio Watanabe					
Hirobumi Watarai					
Mark Watson					
Matt Watson					
Greg Wells					
David West					
Derrick White					
Matthew White					
Matt Whiteside					
Terry Whitfield					
Darrell Whitmore					
Brian Williams					
Dave Williams					
Jeffrey Williams					
Jimmy Williams					
Desi Wilson					
Nigel Wilson					
Robert Wishnevski					
Shannon Withem					
Kevin Witt					
Bob Wolcott					
Michael Wood					
Tyrone Woods					
Craig Worthington					
Christopher Wright					
Szu-Yu Wu					
