= Yachiyo Shoin Junior and Senior High School =

Private schools in Japan

Coordinates: 35°44′30″N 140°07′29″E

Yachiyo Shoin Junior and Senior High School (八千代松陰中学校・高等学校) are private schools located in Yachiyo Chiba prefecture, Japan. Yachiyo Shoin Junior High School & Senior High School are coeducational schools.

== About Yachiyo Shoin High School ==
In 1978, Hisata Yamaguchi established the school in Yachiyo city, Chiba prefecture. He was the professor and the dean of Tokai University School of Physical education. Then, he also opened Yachiyo Shoin Junior High School in 1982. Most of graduates of Yachiyo Shoin High School go on to Nihon University, Toyo University, Komazawa University and Senshu University. Yachiyo shoin High School is one of top private high schools in Chiba, Japan.

== Establishment ==
- 1978- Senior High School
- 1982- Junior High School

== The founder ==
- Hisata Yamaguchi

== Courses ==
- IGS Course
- General Course

== The deviation values ==
- IGS Course: 69 most difficult
- General Course: 64 very difficult

== The number of students ==
- 2100 (Male: 1300, Female: 800)

== Faculties ==
- 170

== University choice of former students ==
2014

- The University of Tokyo: - 1
- Kyoto University: - 0
- Osaka University: - 1
- Kyushu University: - 0
- Hokkaido University: - 2
- Nagoya University: - 0
- Tohoku University: - 2
- Chiba University: - 15
- Niigata University: - 2
- Kanazawa University: - 1
- Nagasaki University: - 1
- Kumamoto University: - 0
- Okayama University: - 0
- Tsukuba University: - 5
- Tokyo Metropolitan University: - 5
- Saitama University: - 5
- Yokohama National University - 4
- Waseda University: - 15
- Keio University: - 10
- Sophia University: - 10
- International Christian University - 5
- Tokyo University of Science: - 10
- Meiji University: - 30
- Aoyama Gakuin University: - 30
- Rikkyo University: - 20
- Chuo University: - 30
- Hosei University: - 40
- Gakushuin University: - 15
- Nihon University - 100
- Toyo University - 50
- Komazawa University - 50
- Senshu University - 50

== Notable alumni ==
- Minako Tanaka (Actress)
- Shota Oba (baseball)
- Kazuhito Tadano (baseball)
- Miho Asahi (Singer)
- Kazuo Takahashi (Professional Wrestler)
- Kazuyuki Fujita (Professional Wrestler)
- Hiroto Katoh (Baseball)
- Hiroyuki Suzuki (Composer)
- Hirobumi Watarai (baseball)
- Fumiko Ezaki (Olympic Silver Medalist, JUDO)
- Gen Kaneko (Actor)
- Kiyokazu Sugita (Comedian)
- Takeshi Sasaki (Politician)
- Hiroshi Matsumoto (Actor)
- Yoshinobu Imamura (Comedian)
- Saori Terakoshi (Track & Field)
- Keikaku Itoh (S.F. Author)
