= List of Lord Marksman and Vanadis light novels =

The light novel series Lord Marksman and Vanadis is written by Tsukasa Kawaguchi and illustrated by Yoshi☆o and Hinata Katagiri. It has been published by Media Factory since April 25, 2011, under their MF Bunko J imprint. The series follows Tigrevurmud Vorn who is a nobleman from Brune. He is captured by Eleonora Viltaria. Eleonora is a beautiful white-haired girl who is one of the seven Vanadis and lord of Leitmeritz. He is later recruited by Elen to help end a civil war between Brune and its neighboring countries to maintain dominance. The first volume of Lord Marksman and Vanadis was released by Media Factory on April 25, 2011. As of November 25, 2017, eighteen volumes have been released under the MF Bunko J imprint. Since its release, Lord Marksman and Vanadis has sold over 800,000 copies in Japan.

The series is split into three separate arcs. The first arc covers the civil war between Brune and Zhcted. It consists of the first five volumes even though Kawaguchi did not confirm which name he should use when writing the sixth volume.^{[LN 6 afterword]} The second arc consists of volumes five though ten. The third arc, beginning with volume 11, is the current arc of Lord Marksman and Vanadis and will conclude with the 15th volume.^{[LN 11 afterword]}^{[LN 14 afterword]}

== Volume list ==
No.	Release date	ISBN
1	April 25, 2011	978-4-8401-3857-4
Prologue (プロローグ, Purorōgu); Chapter 1: "Encounter with the Vanadis"; Chapter 2: "Leitmeritz"; Chapter 3: "The Vanadis' Invitation and the Maid's Prayer"; Chapter 4: "The Life of a Public Official"; Chapter 5: "The Vanadis' Castle"; Chapter 6:" Awakening of the Magic Bullet"; Epilogue (エピローグ, Epirōgu); Afterword (あとがき, Atogaki)
Count Tigrevurmud Vorn is summoned from his homeland Alsace to battle the Zhcted army at the barren Dinant Plains (ディナント平原, Dinanto-heigen). While camping out, Eleonora Viltaria orders her troops to launch a sneak attack on the campsite. With most of Brune's 25,000 troops dead, Tigre is left as one of the few surviving soldiers. He launches an assault on Elen's bodyguards to demoralize the enemy, but is unsuccessful. Elen captures him and takes him to the bustling principality of Leitmeritz. Tigre realizes that Elen's ransom is too high for him or his acquaintances to pay. During a demonstration of Tigre's archery abilities, he subdues an assassin to the townsfolk's surprise. Tigre declines Elen's offer a position in her retinue as he has a responsibility to his homeland and its citizens. Later, Tigre discovers from his servant Bertrand that Duke Felix Aaron Thernardier has dispatched his son Zion to invade Alsace and negotiates with Elen to borrow her army. They travel to Alsace and stop Zion's invasion, rescuing his maid Titta from being raped in the process. Tigre gains a black bow, an heirloom of his ancestors. At Molsheim, Elen and Tigre lead the Leitmeritz army against Zion's forces. Using their powers, Tigre and Elen eventually kill Zion together, liberating Alsace as a result.
2	August 25, 2011	978-4-8401-3970-0
Chapter 1: "Dream of a Distant Day"; Chapter 2: "The Two Vanadis"; Chapter 3: "Territoire"; Chapter 4: "Snow Princess of the Frozen Wave"; Chapter 5: "Cold Snow and Something Warm"; Epilogue (エピローグ, Epirōgu); Afterword (あとがき, Atogaki)
While Elen departs for Zhcted's capital Silesia, Titta vows to stay by Tigre's side. Meanwhile, in Brune's capital Nice, Thenardier learns of his son's death and vows to exact revenge on Tigre. While discussing with Elen's bodyguard Limalisha and his friend Mashas Rodant, Tigre asks Mashas to warn King Faron of the corruption between Thenardier and Maximilian Bennusa Ganelon. Tigre also reveals that his insurgency is based on his peace for Alsace. In Silesia, at King Viktor Artur Volk Estes Tsar Zhcted's request, Elen explains that she was hired by Tigre to invade Brune and Sofya Obertas, the war maiden from Polesia, vouches for her. After her audience is concluded, she has a quarrel with her rival Ludmila Lourie, but Sofy stops them. As Mila's snowy hometown Olmütz has a traditional feud with Leitmeritz that has lasted for several years, she and Elen resent each other. Meanwhile, Tigre and his allies gain the support of noblemen Hughes Augre when he subdues a group of bandits in Territoire. At Rodrik, Tigre meets Mila and encounters a group of assassins known as the Seven Chains. Although Mila and Elen are able to subdue most of the assassins, Lim is bitten by a snake. Tigre saves her by sucking the poison out. In Olmütz, Mila is dispatched by Thenardier to fight with Elen, but they reach stalemates. However, Tigre disguises himself as a bear and realizes that Mila secretly despises Thenardier. Following her to the Tatra mountains, Tigre discovers that Mila has an impregnable fortress. Tigre and Elen destroy the gate and they lead their men into the fortress. Elen's battle with Mila is cut short when the final member of the Seven Chains attempts to kill them, only to be shot by Tigre. Realizing that Tigre intends to protect Alsace, Mila declares her neutrality on the civil war in Brune and severs ties with the Thenardiers.
3	December 22, 2011	978-4-8401-4339-4
Chapter 1: "The Black Knight"; Chapter 2: "Ganelon's Plan"; Chapter 3: "The Brilliant Princess of the Light Flower"; Chapter 4: "Sword of Incivibility"; Chapter 5: "Tir na Fal"; Epilogue (エピローグ, Epirōgu); Afterword (あとがき, Atogaki)
While fighting against a group of Sachstein soldiers, Roland, one of Brune's powerful knights, is summoned to Brune to kill Tigre. Meanwhile, Mashas learns from prime minister Pierre Badowin that Brune's king Faron has fallen ill. As soon as Mashas departs, Sofy rescues him from a group of assassins dispatched to kill him. Meanwhile, at the Orange Plains, Tigre and his allies organize the combined Zhcted and Brune armies as the Silver Meteor Storm. The army then confronts Marquis Charon Antoine Greast, who is Ganelon's tactician and has an infatuation with Elen. They successfully defeat Greast, who vows to capture Elen. Arriving at the army's campsite, Sofy informs Tigre that he has been stripped of his nobility due to his association with Elen.
4	April 25, 2012	978-4-8401-4553-4
Chapter 1: "A Temporary Farewell"; Chapter 2: "2,000 and 20,000"; Chapter 3: "Rainbow Eyes"; Chapter 4: "Gathering"; Chapter 5: "The Revelation"; Epilogue (エピローグ, Epirōgu); Afterword (あとがき, Atogaki)
5	August 24, 2012	978-4-8401-4685-2
Chapter 1: "March of the Dragons"; Chapter 2: "Fire Drake and Double-Headed Dragon"; Chapter 3: "Interlude"; Chapter 4: "The Palace's Sacred Caverns"; Chapter 5: "Decisive Battle"; Epilogue (エピローグ, Epirōgu); Afterword (あとがき, Atogaki)
6	January 25, 2013	978-4-8401-4962-4
Chapter 1: "Emissary"; Chapter 2: "The Blue World and the Traveling Girl"; Chapter 3: "A Foreign Land"; Chapter 4: "Tallard Graham"; Chapter 5: "The Fall of Fort Lux"; Epilogue (エピローグ, Epirōgu); Afterword (あとがき, Atogaki)
7	July 25, 2013	978-4-8401-5187-0
Chapter 1: "Burning the Villages"; Chapter 2: "Cornered and No Way Out"; Chapter 3: "A Ruler's Cruelty"; Chapter 4: "The Princess of the Dancing Blades"; Afterword (あとがき, Atogaki)
8	January 24, 2014	978-4-04-066154-4
Chapter 1: "Olsina"; Chapter 2: "Phoenix"; Chapter 3: "Successors"; Chapter 4: "Behind the Scenes"; Afterword (あとがき, Atogaki)
9	May 23, 2014	978-4-04-066749-2
Chapter 1: "Past Fate"; Chapter 2: "Before Dawn"; Chapter 3: "Departure"; Chapter 4: "Lebus's Deity"; Chapter 5: Baba Yaga; Afterword (あとがき, Atogaki)
10	October 24, 2014	978-4-04-067124-6
Chapter 1: "Those who return, Those who visit"; Chapter 2: "Urs"; Chapter 3: "The Witch"; Chapter 4: "Winters End"; Epilogue (エピローグ, Epirōgu); Afterword (あとがき, Atogaki)
11	March 25, 2015	978-4-04-067477-3
12	July 24, 2015	978-4-04-067720-0
13	November 25, 2015	978-4-04-067958-7
14	March 25, 2016	978-4-04-068180-1
15	August 25, 2016	978-4-04-068601-1
16	January 25, 2017	978-4-04-069014-8
17	July 25, 2017	978-4-04-069348-4
18	November 25, 2017	978-4-04-069455-9

== See also ==
- Lord Marksman and Vanadis characters
- Lord Marksman and Vanadis episodes
