= List of Lord Marksman and Vanadis episodes =

Cover of the first DVD/Blu-ray volume of Lord Marksman and Vanadis as released by Media Factory on December 24, 2014.

Lord Marksman and Vanadis is an anime series adapted from the light novel of the same title by written by Tsukasa Kawaguchi and illustrated Yoshi☆o and Hinata Katagiri. Set during a civil war in an alternate Europe, the series follows the adventures of Tigrevurmud "Tigre" Vorn, who is a nobleman from the Brunish territory of Alsace that participates in a failed invasion attempt. Eleonora "Elen" Viltaria is a war maiden from the Zhctedian territory of Leitmeritz. Elen captures Tigre and recruits him into her army. The two are inevitably drawn into the conflict when Tigre's homeland Alsace is invaded. They must stop Duke Felix Aaron Thenardier's plot for power. The anime adapts material from the first five volumes of the light novel series.

Produced by Satelight and written and directed by Tatsuo Satō, the series premiered on October 4, 2014, on AT-X with later broadcasts on MBS, Tokyo MX, TVA and BS11, with advance screenings held on September 20, 2014, at United Cinemas Toyosu. In conjunction with the anime adaptation, a weekly mini series called Tigre and Vanadish (ティグルくんとヴァナディーちゅ, Tigre-kun to Vanadi-chu) and a short narration by Yuka Iguchi as Limalisha called the Lim's Report was streamed online. Tigre and Vanadish is 2D animated with chibi sized characters that play out short segments of the light novel that were edited out of the anime. Lim's Report is a brief summary and analysis of the war tactics used by each forces in each episode. The first Blu-ray and DVD compilation was released by Media Factory on December 24, 2014, with later volumes being released monthly until May 27, 2015, for a total of six volumes. The volumes also includes the Tigre and Vanadish mini-series and other bonus material.

In North America, Funimation licensed the series for simulcast on their official website. After Funimation's one week exclusive rights ended, the anime was made available through the Hulu service in the United States. Crunchyroll has the streaming rights in Middle East, North Africa, and Europe excluding the Nordics, UK, and Ireland. Funimation scheduled the release of Lord Marksman and Vanadis in a complete Blu-ray/DVD boxset on February 9, 2016. In the United Kingdom, Lord Marksman and Vanadis is licensed by Anime Limited. It was released in a complete boxset on February 29, 2016. In Australia and New Zealand, the series is licensed by Madman Entertainment.

The background music for the series was composed by Masaru Yokoyama and Nobuaki Nobusawa. Three pieces of theme music are used throughout the series. The opening theme is titled "Ginsen no Kaze" (銀閃の風, lit. "Wind of the Silver Flash"). It is performed by Konomi Suzuki. The first ending theme is used for most of the series. The first ending theme is titled "Schwarzer Bogen" (lit. Black Bow). It is performed by Hitomi Harada. She is Valentina's voice actress. The second ending theme is used for the tenth episode. The second ending theme is titled Ryūsei Requiem (竜星鎮魂歌(レクイエム), Ryūsei Rekuiemu; lit. 'Dragon Star Requiem'). It is also performed by Konomi Suzuki.

== Episode list ==
=== Lord Marksman and Vanadis ===
No.	Title	Directed by	Written by	Original release date
1	"Wind Princess of the Battlefield"; Transliteration: "Senjō no kazehime" (Japanese: 戦場の風姫)	Kazuhide Kondo	Tatsuo Satō	October 4, 2014
During the Battle of Dinant, war maiden Eleonora "Elen" Viltaria and her 5,000 troops obliterate an army of 25,000 soldiers from the Brune Kingdom, leaving count Tigrevurmud "Tigre" Vorn among the surviving soldiers. Elen ultimately captures Tigre, bringing him to her bustling territory, Leitmeritz. After dreaming of being ridiculed by Zion Thenardier, Tigre is awakened by Elen. Tigre then tells Elen that the ransom she is demanding for his release as her prisoner of war is exorbitant. Elen arranges Tigre for a demonstration with an inferior bow. When an assassin attempts to aim at Elen with a crossbow, she destroys the bolt using aerokinesis. Determining the limits of the bow, Tigre shoots the assassin in the foot, allowing Elen's colleague and bodyguard "Lim" Limalisha to apprehend the assassin. Although the bow was poorly made to humiliate Tigre, he showed exceptional archery skills. Elen offers Tigre to serve under her, and she allows him to keep his nobility title due to his promise to protect his home back in the territory Alsace. As Tigre grows used to life at Leitmeritz, his loyal attendant Bertrand arrives at night in the imperial palace, telling Tigre that duke Felix Aaron Thenardier is mobilizing troops towards Alsace.
2	"The Return Home"; Transliteration: "Kikan" (Japanese: 帰還)	Shunsuke Ishikawa	Tatsuo Satō	October 11, 2014
In the territory of Nemetacum, Thenardier dispatches his son Zion to destroy Alsace as a sign of dominance now that the Brune prince Regnas has been killed. The soothsayer Drekavac gives Zion two dragons to be used as war beasts. In Leitmeritz, Tigre desperately tries to get back to protect his homeland. When Elen stops him and asks what Tigre alone could possibly do against 3,000 soldiers, he asks her to let him borrow her army. Greatly amused, Elen accepts on the condition that she will rule Alsace, which Tigre complies. In Alsace, Tigre's maid Titta helps to evacuate the citizens but decides to stay at Tigre's home. While Zion's forces start pillaging the town, Zion decides to destroy the mansion. Zion attempts to molest Titta, only to be forced to retreat after being interrupted by the timely arrival of Tigre and Elen. When an enemy archer tries to shoot Tigre, he catches the arrow and shoots it back, destroying his bow in the process. Titta gives Tigre the Black Bow, an heirloom of his ancestors.
3	"Return of the Magic Marksman"; Transliteration: "Yomigaeru Madan" (Japanese: 甦る魔弾)	Takashi Watanabe	Tatsuo Satō	October 18, 2014
During the Battle of Molsheim, the Thenardier Army of 2,700 soldiers clash with the Leitmeritz Army of 900 soldiers on the open plains, with Elen and Tigre leading the charge. When the Leitmeritz Army defeats Zion's first battalion, he send in his earth dragon, which crushes anything in its path. Elen faces the earth dragon alone, while Lim and Rurick lead flanking maneuvers to distract the enemy forces. Using the full power of her Viralt, a long sword named Arifar, Elen slices the earth dragon in half, while Lim and Rurick's forces lead their pursuers into a series of traps. Zion is dismayed and refuses to send the wyvern into battle. Informed that the Leitmeritz Army is equipped with 2,000 reinforcements at his rear, Zion starts to panic. In reality, the reinforcements consisted of a shadow army of only 100 men with 2,000 remounts. Zion orders the second battalion to retreat, consequently allowing the Leitmeritz Army to slaughter them from behind. When Zion attempts to flee on the wyvern, Tigre's Black Bow speaks to him and absorbs power from Elen's Arifar, allowing Tigre to shoot down the wyvern and Zion. The Leitmeritz Army celebrates their victory over the Thenardier Army.
4	"Snow Princess of the Frozen Ripple"; Transliteration: "Mīcheria" (Japanese: 凍漣の雪姫(ミーチェリア))	Yukio Nishimoto	Tatsuo Satō	October 25, 2014
Elen is summoned to Silesia, the capital city of the Zhcted Kingdom, leaving Lim behind to help Tigre. In Silesia, Elen explains to king Viktor Artur Volk Estes Tsar Zhcted that she was hired by Tigre to invade the Brune Kingdom in order to acquire peace in Alsace. Afterwards, Elen starts a quarrel with Olmütz war maiden Ludmila "Mila" Lourie, but they are halted by Polesia war maiden Sofya "Sofy" Obertas. When Tigre and Titta return from checking on the citizens of Alsace, they are joined by earl Mashas Rodant, Tigre's friend and ally. Tigre convinces other nobles to join his cause, including Territoire viscount Hughes Augre and his son Gerard Augre. Elen, Tigre and Lim discuss their plans but are interrupted by the arrival of Mila. They decide to reconvene in the village of Rodrick, and Mila questions Tigre about his motives as they ride on horseback. Along the way, they are ambushed by the Seven Chains Assassins. Mila uses her Viralt, a short spear named Lavias, using cryokinesis to kill six of these mercenaries. However, Lim is bitten by a snake, prompting Tigre to suck out the venom. Tigre and Elen head towards Rodrick to get medical attention.
5	"The Storming of the Tatra Mountains"; Transliteration: "Tatorasan Kōryakusen" (Japanese: タトラ山攻略戦)	Takashi Watanabe	Tatsuo Satō	November 1, 2014
After Lim recovers from her snakebite, Elen "rewards" Tigre setting up a bath in a private hot springs bathhouse with a displeased Mila. The four of them then tour the marketplace in Rodrick, but Mila immediately returns to her snowy homeland of Olmütz on the border of Leitmeritz. Elen orders Lim to increase the border patrol, correctly predicting that Mila has mobilized her forces. During the Battle of Vlkolin, the Leitmeritz Army clashes with the Olmütz Army, but their battle ends in a stalemate. Mila retreats to the Tatra Fortress, a nearly impregnable citadel, and the Leitmeritz Army settles in for a siege. Disguising himself as a bear, Tigre scouts for an alternate route to the fortress before encountering Mila. She shares tea with him as she expresses her misgivings of being a war maiden. After following Mila towards the fortress, Tigre reports back to Elen. As Elen and Tigre then lead a raid of 100 men into the mountains, Elen uses her full power to try to break through the rear gate but fails. When Tigre saves Elen from certain death, the two combine their powers to destroy the rear gate and lead their men into the breach.
6	"The Black Knight"; Transliteration: "Kurokishi" (Japanese: 黒騎士)	Kazuhide Kondo	Tatsuo Satō	November 8, 2014
After destroying the rear gate to the Tatra Fortress, Elen duels Mila. However, this is interrupted by the last member of the Seven Chains Assassins, only to be killed by Tigre. Mila realizes that Tigre not only was the bear hunter that she previously met, but also only wants to protect Alsace. In gratitude for Tigre saving her life, Mila declare her neutrality, thus ending the battle. On the western border of the Brune Kingdom, Roland, leader of the Navarre Knights and wielder of the legendary sword Durendal, receives a royal degree to kill Tigre. In the territory Territoire, the Alsace Army and the Leitmeritz Army form an uneasy coalition, which is named the Silver Meteor Storm. Sofy, who was sent as a diplomatic envoy, arrives at the army camp, informing that Brune prime minister Pierre Badouin has charged Tigre with treason. Sofy tells Elen the whereabouts of the remaining four war maidens. While Tigre and Hughes struggle to retain loyalty of their allies, the Navarre Knights approach and Roland rejects all offers of parlay. During the Battle of Orange, the Silver Meteor Storm suffers heavy casualties. Tigre is severely injured while saving Elen from being attacked by Roland.
7	"To Protect"; Transliteration: "Mamorutameni" (Japanese: 守るために)	Kenji Yasuda	Tatsuo Satō	November 15, 2014
Sofy appears and uses her Viralt, a priest staff named Zaht, using photokinesis to repel oncoming Navarre Knights, then again to vanish once Elen and Tigre are safely away. When Mashas and his reinforcements arrive, the Navarre Knights stop their pursuit. In the army camp, Mashas says that he was unable to meet with king Faron Soleil Rauy Blainville de Charles, though Badouin told Mashas that Faron's health is precarious. With Tigre still unconscious, Elen promises to win the battle and Sofy volunteers to help her. After waking up, Tigre is guided by the Black Bow and accompanied by Titta to a mysterious temple belonging to the goddess of night, darkness and death named Tir Na Fal. When Titta is possessed, Tigre shoots Titta in a test of resolve for greater power. He controls this power so that the arrow does not harm Titta, causing the temple to disappear. The Silver Meteor Storm diverts the plains into a bog, easily targeting the Navarre Knights. After Tigre arrives at the battlefield despite reopening his wounds, he shoots Roland with his new power. Roland barely survives and accepts defeat. With half of the Navarre Knights dead, the battle comes to an end.
8	"2,000 vs. 20,000"; Transliteration: "Ni-sen tai Ni-man" (Japanese: 二千対二万)	Shunsuke Ishikawa	Tatsuo Satō	November 22, 2014
Roland leaves Durendal in the care of Tigre. Elen receives a letter from Legnica war maiden Alexandra "Sasha" Alshavin, who asks for Elen's assistance in dealing with an invasion. Meanwhile, Roland arrives at Nice, the capital city of the Brune Kingdom, only to be killed by duke Maximilian Bennusa Ganelon with a swarm of bees. Despite this, Ganelon informs Thenardier that an army of 20,000 men from the Muozinel Kingdom is invading the Brune Kingdom. Thenardier takes a third of his troops to face the invaders and sends the remainder to Nice in order to counter Ganelon. When Tigre hears of the invasion, he decides to face the invaders, despite being outnumbered tenfold. Eventually, Tigre leads his main force against the Muozinel Army vanguard and kills general Kasim, allowing Tigre to free slaves in the territory Agnes. Gerard informs Tigre that despite suffering few casualties, their supplies are starting to run low, and that the retreating Muozinel Army soldiers are joining an even larger invading force, which will number 40,000 in mere days. Tigre leads some of his riders to meet the Muozinel Army cavalry, which is unexpectedly reinforced by the arrival of Mila and the Olmütz Army.
9	"Thunder Swirl and Luminous Flame"; Transliteration: "Kaminariuzu to kagayaku honō" (Japanese: 雷渦と煌炎)	Kumiko Habara	Tatsuo Satō	November 29, 2014
In Legnica, Elen is told by Sasha that Lebus war maiden Elizaveta "Liza" Fomina is using an incident during their joint campaign against pirates as an excuse to invade. Sasha also notes that her Viralt, twin daggers named Bargren, refuse to leave her despite her poor health. In Agnes, Tigre negotiates terms with Mila to ally the Olmütz Army with the Silver Meteor Storm. Gerard informs Tigre that a rescued girl named Regin Estelle Loire Bastien do Charles refuses to eat, so Tigre convinces her to eat by sharing her food. During the Battle of Boroszlo, the Leitmeritz-Legnica Coalition Army faces against the Lebus Army. Elen eventually overpowers Liza, who calls off the fight. Liza informs Elen that Thenardier and Ganelon are ready to move and that Tigre is facing the invasion from the Muozinel Army. Elen accepts the terms of the ceasefire and hurries to rejoin Tigre. Meanwhile, Mila proposes only one battle to defeat the Muozinel Army, which is led by Kureys Shahin Balamir, the younger brother of the king of Muozinel. Kureys presses his attack disregarding the presence of any forces from the Zhcted Kingdom, while Tigre and Mila prepare for battle.
10	"The Ormea Campaign"; Transliteration: "Orumea kaisen" (Japanese: オルメア会戦)	Kazuhide Kondo	Tatsuo Satō	December 6, 2014
During the Battle of Ormea, the Muozinel Army of 40,000 troops arrive at the Ormea Hills, where the Silver Meteor Storm has made a small stronghold on the first hill. Kureys splits the Muozinel Army into seven divisions. While decoying refugees occupy the first through fourth divisions at the stronghold, Tigre and Mila lead an ambush at the second hill against the fifth and sixth divisions. However, Tigre and Mila become surrounded when attacking the seventh division. Tigre and Mila are reinforced when allied knights Emil, Shaie and Auguste arrive to aid the Silver Meteor Storm. Although the reinforcements will now total 5,000 men, another 3,000 men led by Hughes and Mashas also arrive, forcing Kureys to retreat and regroup. When word reaches Kureys that the Muozinel fleet left behind to attack the Brune Kingdom's southern harbor was sunk by Thenardier, Kureys decides to withdraw and give his personal congratulations to Tigre via envoy. Elen and Lim return to Tigre and Mila, causing yet another disagreement between Elen and Mila. That night, Tigre and Elen discuss the battle, and Tigre vows that he will not forget those who died fighting for him.
11	"Two War Maidens"; Transliteration: "Senhime futari" (Japanese: 戦姫二人)	Tatsufumi Ito	Tatsuo Satō	December 13, 2014
At Perche Fortress, Osterode war maiden Valentina "Tina" Glinka Estes uses her Viralt, a grim reaper scythe named Ezendeis, using umbrakinesis to witness Tigre in his sleep. During a meeting, Bertrand summons Regin, who reveals that she posed as Regnas. The night before the Battle of Dinant, Regin was attacked by assassins and was forced to fake her death. Without any other proof of her bloodline, she can only prove her birthright as Faron's daughter in the Holy Grotto located in Artishem, the capital city of the territory Lutetia, ruled by Ganelon. Meanwhile, Thenardier receives five dragons from Drekavac and moves to intercept the Siver Meteor Storm. In Lutetia, Ganelon anticipates the final battle between Tigre and Thenardier, then sets fire to Artishem. During the Battle of Villecresnes, the Silver Meteor Storm of 20,000 clashes with the Thenardier Army of 24,000. With their combined power, Elen and Mila slay the three earth dragons, but the fire drake and the double-headed dragon are armed with magical chains and remain unscathed. After the armies reorganize, Tigre leads flanking maneuvers against the enemy forces, while the two war maidens decide to slay the two remaining dragons by themselves.
12	"The Holy Grotto (Saint-Groel)"; Transliteration: "Sanguroeru" (Japanese: 聖窟宮(サングロエル))	Takashi Watanabe	Tatsuo Satō	December 20, 2014
After Elen wakes up Tigre through "bloodlust", Tigre tells Elen, Lim, Mila, Titta and Regin that their next course of action is to head to Artishem. Regin explains that there are three routes to the Holy Grotto, and they choose the second route through the Mosha Temple. Taking a hidden passageway under the temple into the caverns, Tigre, Elen, Regin, Rurick and Bertrand discover that Thenardier and his men used another route. As a battle ensues, Thenardier sends his second-in-command Steid to pursue Tigre and Regin, while Elen faces Thenardier. The cavern begins to collapse, and Thenardier chooses to retreat. However, Steid continues to pursue Tigre. While Elen, Regin and Rurick flee, Tigre is saved by Bertrand at the cost of his life before Steid is crushed by falling rocks. Trapped underground, Tigre rushes to Bertrand, who speaks of how fortunate he was to serve Tigre before dying. Elen and Regin rush back to Artishem, where Elen finds Tigre alive and Bertrand dead in a pit. As the final battle with Thenardier approaches, the leaders of the Silver Meteor Storm wonder if Tigre will be able to overcome the death of Bertrand.
13	"The Widening World"; Transliteration: "Hirogaru sekai" (Japanese: 広がる世界)	Katsuya Asano	Tatsuo Satō	December 27, 2014
A flashback reveals that Tigre used the Black Bow to shoot through the bedrock and create the pit. Tigre recovers his mettle when Elen tells him that she felt pride when she began as a simple mercenary. They then talk about building a trade route that will connect Alsace and Leitmeritz. Badouin visits the army camp, informing that Faron was repeatedly poisoned by Ganelon but has regained his wits. During the Battle of Mereville, the fight goes in favor of the Silver Meteor Storm, since Steid no longer commands the Thenardier Army. Facing off against Thenardier, Tigre draws a single arrow and throws out his quiver after Elen brings Tigre back to his senses. Thenardier charges at Tigre, who shoots him through the forehead out of his saddle. In Nice, the populace celebrates the Silver Meteor Storm as heroes. Faron agrees to Tigre's terms for peace and recognizes Regin as his heir. He also honors Tigre with the title Knight of the Moonlight, traditionally given to the future king of Brune. A few days later, Faron dies and Regin ascends to the throne. Tigre and Titta return to Leitmeritz, and the construction of the trade route begins by springtime.

=== Tigre and Vanadish ===
No.	Title	Directed by	Written by	Original release date
0	"Encounter with the War Maiden"; Transliteration: "Senki to nosōgū" (Japanese: 戦姫とのそーぐー)	Minoru Ashina	Minoru Ashina	October 3, 2014
After "Lim" Limalisha explains the origin of Viralt, she debates with count Tigrevurmud "Tigre" Vorn that war maiden Eleonora "Elen" Viltaria is referred to as the "Vanadis", whereas there is no evidence that proves Tigre as being the "Lord Marksman".
1	"Put Your Back to It!"; Transliteration: "Hageshiku Tsuke!" (Japanese: はげしく突け!)	Minoru Ashina	Minoru Ashina	October 10, 2014
Elen trains Tigre with a different weapon other than a bow, and he chooses a spear. However, as Tigre's attacks prove weak against Elen, he accidentally gropes her, prompting Lim to defeat him.
2	"The Snacking War Maiden"; Transliteration: "Kaigui Senki" (Japanese: 買い食い戦姫)	Minoru Ashina	Minoru Ashina	October 17, 2014
An angry Lim confronts Tigre and Elen for snacking on street food from various vendors. Since Tigre and Elen each had apple jam on their cheeks, making Lim more furious, Elen gives Lim a teddy bear to defuse the situation.
3	"The Teddy Bear Awakens"; Transliteration: "Mezameru Kuma-tan" (Japanese: 覚醒めるくまたん)	Minoru Ashina	Minoru Ashina	October 24, 2014
Tigre and Elen hide in Lim's bedroom full of teddy bears. When Lim enters, she is full of joy until she realizes that someone may be in her bedroom. Tigre makes one of the teddy bears like a puppet, making Lim feel full of joy again.
4	"The Bear Lover"; Transliteration: "Kuma suki ga Hitori" (Japanese: くま好き一人)	Minoru Ashina	Minoru Ashina	October 31, 2014
Lim desperately asks Titta to give her an old teddy bear, but Titta mentions that a new teddy bear can be ready the next day. Lim falsely says that it is for an attendant of Elen. When Tigre shows up, Lim panics but mentions that this attendant is shy and reserved. Tigre tells Titta to have the teddy bear ready for the next day, which quietly excites Lim.
5	"A Cute Teddy Bear and That Special Soft Spot"; Transliteration: "Kawaii Kuma to Yawarakai nanikato" (Japanese: 可愛いくまとやわらかい何かと)	Minoru Ashina	Minoru Ashina	November 7, 2014
Titta delivers the teddy bear to Lim, not knowing that she was the "attendant of Elen". When Elen soon arrives, she mentions that Tigre saved Lim from a snakebite by "smooching" her breast.
6	"Something About You and Something Beautiful"; Transliteration: "Anata kana nanikato to Kirei nanikato" (Japanese: あたたかな何かときれいな何かと)	Minoru Ashina	Minoru Ashina	November 14, 2014
Ludmila "Mila" Lourie is upset because she was tricked by Tigre wearing a bear costume. Despite the fact that Tigre enjoyed Mila's tea, Elen and Mila develop a strong rivalry. As Mila and Elen each draw their weapons after Tigre compares their bodies, Lim suggests for him to run.
7	"The Natural Brilliant Princess"; Transliteration: "Ten'nen no Akaru Hime" (Japanese: 天然の耀姫)	Minoru Ashina	Minoru Ashina	November 21, 2014
Sofya "Sofy" Obertas questions Tigre on what he likes about Elen, and he replies that she is a comrade in arms. Sofy then talks to Elen, who only views Tigre from a contract bond. Although Sofy wishes to borrow Tigre for "fun things", Elen urges Sofy to stay away from Tigre when she visits.
8	"Scoffer vs. Baldie"; Transliteration: "Hiniku tai Hagaetama" (Japanese: 皮肉 対 禿頭)	Minoru Ashina	Minoru Ashina	November 28, 2014
Gerard Augre and Rurick start an argument as to whether or not Tigre was the main reason for victory in the battle. Gerard then gives verified proof that Tigre is the "king of the ladies' man", which Rurick finally agrees on.
9	"A Secret Gathering"; Transliteration: "Kossori Shūketsu" (Japanese: こっそり集結)	Minoru Ashina	Minoru Ashina	December 5, 2014
Elizaveta "Liza" Fomina visits Alexandra "Sasha" Alshavin, giving her a formal apology for the incident in their joint campaign. Sasha then gives Liza an exaggerated description of Tigre, based on what Elen told Sasha.
10	"The Truth Is Nearly Revealed"; Transliteration: "Akiraga sareru kakeru shinjutsu" (Japanese: 明かされかける真実)	Minoru Ashina	Minoru Ashina	December 12, 2014
Mila is frustrated when Lim tells her that Tigre and Elen are alone outside, which sends Titta in a panic. After Mila accidentally mentions that she and Tigre have slept together already following the battle, this puts Titta in a frenzy.
11	"The Truth Has Been Revealed"; Transliteration: "Akiraga sarete shimatta shinjutsu" (Japanese: 明かされてしまった真実)	Minoru Ashina	Minoru Ashina	December 19, 2014
After Elen and Lima scold Regin Estelle Loire Bastien do Charles for "testing" Tigre's true intentions, Elen and Lim mention occasions when Tigre has been seemingly scandalous. However, Elen is unaware of the occasion when Tigre groped Mila in the past, prompting Tigre to give Lim a teddy bear to help him deal with Elen.
12	"Interlude"; Transliteration: "Makuai" (Japanese: 幕間)	Minoru Ashina	Minoru Ashina	December 26, 2014
Valentina "Tina" Glinka Estes explains that her Viralt, a grim reaper scythe named Ezendeis, can help her move through space and time. She goes behind the scenes, first witnessing Titta behind a depressed Tigre. Tina also witnesses Elen talking to Rurick, as they show concern for Tigre. Lastly, Tina is forced to make one of Lim's teddy bears like a puppet without being caught.
13	"One More Epilogue"; Transliteration: "Mō Hitotsu no Epirōgu" (Japanese: もう一つのエピローグ)	Minoru Ashina	Minoru Ashina	January 6, 2015
As Tigre and Elen prepare to leave, Sofy points out that Elen always calls Mila flat-chested, but Elen fails to realize that Titta and Regin have small bosoms. The girls then question Tigre what bust size he prefers. When Rurick arrives, Tigre accidentally trips and falls on Rurick, groping his chest.

== See also ==
- Lord Marksman and Vanadis characters
- Lord Marksman and Vanadis light novels
