= Wakatake =

Wakatake is a Japanese surname. It refers to the following:

== People ==
- Chisako Wakatake (born 1954), Japanese writer
- Ryuji Wakatake (born 1987), Nippon Professional Baseball pitcher for the Hokkaido Nippon-Ham Fighters

== Other ==
- Wakatake-class destroyer, a type of Japanese destroyer that was used in the Japanese Imperial Navy
