= Coat Corporation =

Japanese gay video production company

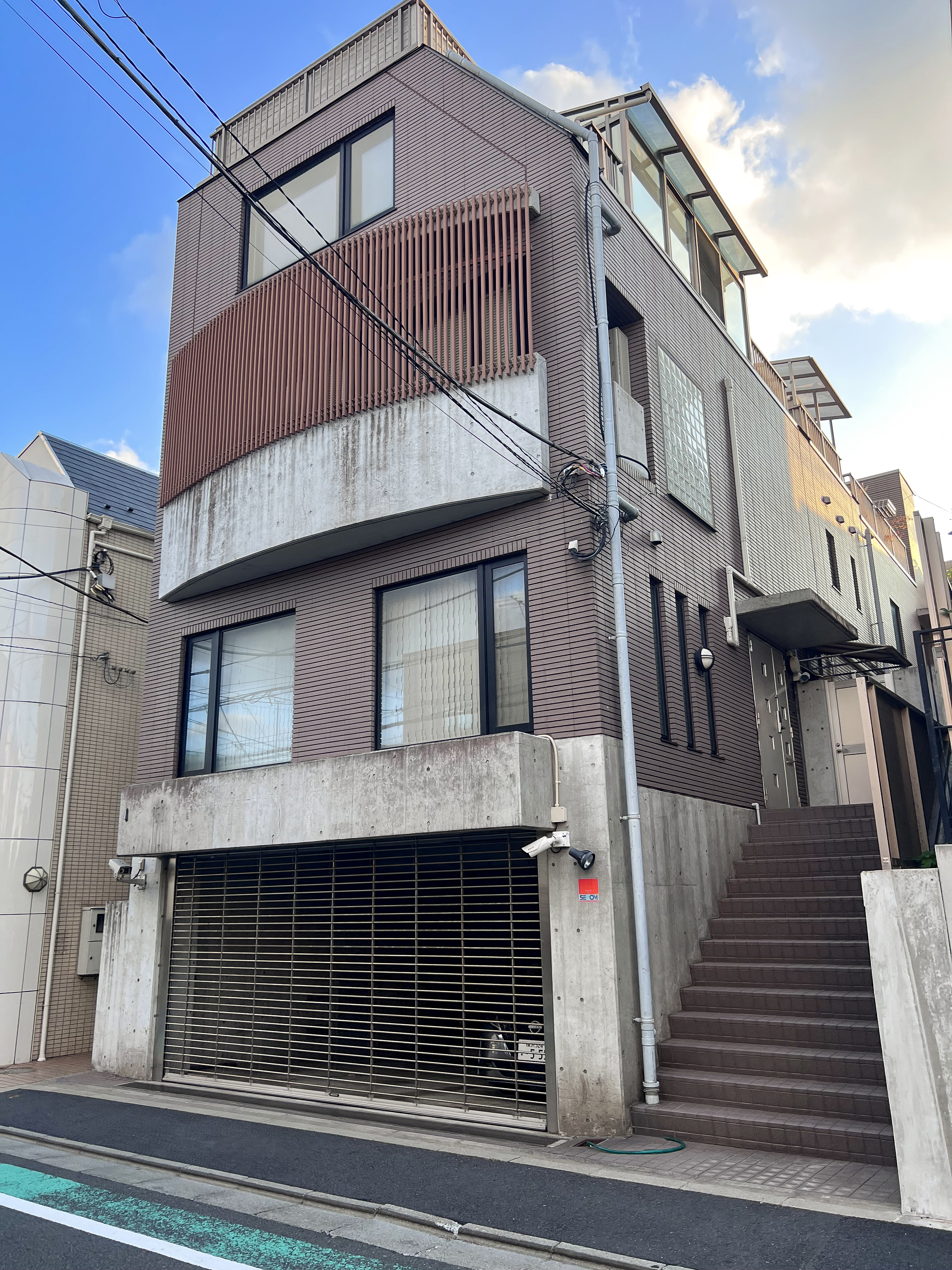
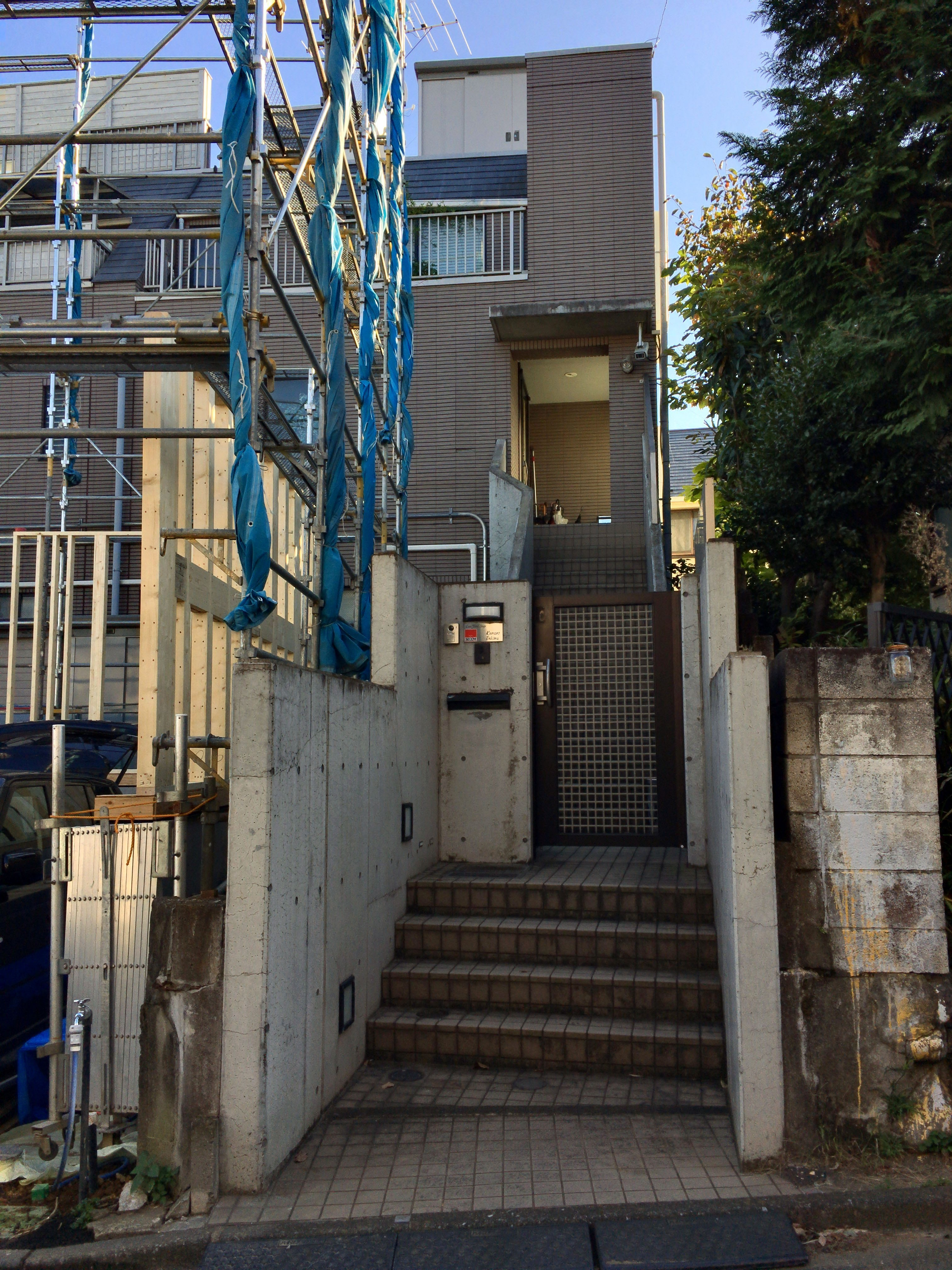
- Coat First Stage in Shimokitazawa
- Native name: コートコーポレーション
- Type: Kabushiki gaisha
- Industry: Information and communication
- Headquarters: 3-23-14 Shimokitazawa, Coat First Stage 1F, Setagaya, Tokyo, Japan
- Key people: Hayato Eshima (Representative Director)
- Website: www.coat.co.jp

Coat Corporation Co. Ltd (Japanese: 株式会社コートコーポレーション, Hepburn: Kabushiki gaisha Kōto Kōporēshon) is a gay video production company in Japan. Founded in 1993, its headquarters are in Shimokitazawa, Setagaya, Tokyo.

== History ==
Coat Corporation launched Power Grip, which featured mainly gym class students, in 1991. Since then, the company has regularly released works of about eight titles each month, and has contributed more than 160 titles to date all the while changing the genre. Affiliated yūgen gaisha Kuratatsu (蔵建) has been around since 1997, while Coat West in Osaka Prefecture has been releasing works under the same name since 2003.

After Power Grip, the company launched many new labels, under which they produced more than forty titles. Their wide range of models and themes such as athletes, Johnny's, salarymen, gay slang, and SM, fit in genres ranging from soft to hard.

Around the same time, Coat released its first situational gay video series Babylon, reaching Vol. 60 in 2012. Kuratatsu later released the heavy gym-class label, danGet, and the Johnny's Jr. label, Fine, from Out Staff in 1997. Although danGet was discontinued in 2008 after Volume 25, Fine still continues to release work, with its total number of titles reaching over sixty, as of 2012. A variety of other labels were also established. One called Exfeed became independent afterwards.

== Criminal case ==
In 1996, a male high school student was told to "not appear in the video" on the streets of Setagaya, but he agreed that he "would take off his pants for ¥2,000" or "¥50,000 for thirty minutes" and was filmed naked in a nearby karaoke box, and led to seven people, including Corporation President Hayato Eroshima, getting arrested for violation of the Employment Security Law (recruitment for harassment work purposes). This case was related to that of Tokyo Metropolitan High School teacher Yumiko Kato's involvement in "Imakita Kato" which consisted of television tarento, and it was widely reported that there were 170 students who appeared in response to the solicitation.

== Internet meme ==
Manatsu no Yo no Inmu (真夏の夜の淫夢; lit. 'A Midsummer Night's Lewd Dream'), often shortened to Inmu, a porn produced by Coat Corporation; gained public attention in 2002 after professional baseball player Kazuhito Tadano was found to be in the cast. Soon after the founding of Japanese video-sharing website Niconico in 2007, Internet users began to upload video mash-up parodies mocking this scandal. Inmu videos and its creator communities have been in steady growth since 2010 and Inmu remains the most popular genre of videos on Niconico as of 2015. Now Inmu represents a collection of Internet contents ridiculing Japanese gay pornography. Many other porns made by Coat Corporation or other companies are also included. Inmu communities typically make fun of the lines and plots of these porns. While popular among youths on social media, Inmu generally remains a taboo in traditional media due to its connection to pornography and a past scandal.

The central figure of Inmu videos is Yaju Senpai (Japanese: 野獣先輩, lit. 'beast senpai'), an actor appearing in the original porn, who is parodied the most. His true name was never revealed, and an attempt to identify him in 2016 was cancelled due to ethical concerns.

The vocabulary of parodies is based generally based on notable lines in Inmu as well as some Japanese numeral homophones. Among the most commonly used are:

- 114514 - homophone for いいよ，こいよ "sure, come on". A Chinese homophone is 逸一时，误一世, "a moment of leisure can lead to a lifetime of loss", generally used to "explain" the number in a more sanitized way.
- 810 - homophone for 野獸 yaju, a reference to Yaju Senpai. In reference to this number, member of the Inmu communities gather at the shooting location of Inmu on August 10 each year, despite Coat Corporation's pleas not to.
- ホモ - "homo", an endonym used by people in Inmu communities. Also written 木毛 in Chinese.
- 微レ存 - "microscopically present", generally used to mean a slim, but non-zero chance.

These references are popular not only on the Japanese Internet, but also among a subset of Chinese and Taiwanese Internet users.

Kotaku reported in 2017 that a Inmu reference appears to be present in the Nintendo Switch, a phenomenon originally noticed by Japanese Twitter users.

In August 2026, an AI-generated music video referencing the memes that spawned from Inmu titled INMU KING was uploaded on YouTube and Niconico, which instantly became a hit and charted second in the Oricon YouTube chart. The music video also became popular in China, but Internet users have reported that the video cannot be uploaded to Bilibili due to the contents violating China's laws against religious contents online, as well as the video featuring Winnie the Pooh.

== List of brands ==
These include former labels.

=== Coat ===
- Active Body
- Another Version (both male and female subjects)
- Babylon (story-type) its most notable work is Manatsu no Yo no Inmu
- birth
- Coat
- DMT (athlete-type)
- Fella Zammai
- Gand
- Hello
- King Cock
- Number (athlete-type)
- Power Grip
- Rock Bull
- Round Zero (athlete-type)
- Precious (solo works)
- Shoot
- Taiiku-kai Seiha

Former labels

- Hentai Mensetsu-kan Super S (job interviews)
- Misshitsu to Hito
- Nanpa Senmon Gakugun
- Out Staff (athlete-type/re-edited version also released in 2013)
- Scooop!!!
- Scout Caravan (scout-type)

=== Kuratatsu ===
- Basara (SM-type)
- CK Head Line (catalogue)
- Complete Couple (best collection collecting the titles of two actors)
- Complete File (best collection collecting the titles of an actor)
- Conception
- danGet (Yarō-type/first issue released in 1997)
- Discovery
- EnVY (story-type)
- E-Style
- Fine (idol-type/first issue released in 1997)
- The Feti (scatology-type, gaten-type, etc.)
- Gacchibi!! (featuring short actors)
- Ge:X
- Harem
- i-mode Gakuen (idol-type) ※ ended
- Kuratatsu
- Nude (idol-type)
- Scooop!!! (hard-type) (サイクロップス先輩 introduction)
- Scratch (documentary-type)
- Sei Kore. (gaku ran-type)
- Taikyoku (gachimuchi-type)

=== Coat West (Osaka) ===
- Ace
- Back Sniper
- Coat West
- The Series "The Deisui"
- ELoS (Edge Life of Story) (story-type)
- Grand Slam
- Hostclub Hot News * Idol Beach (Big Wave, Endless Journey etc.)
- Kiss
- The Series "The Kōshō"
- Luxe (Sho, Hikaru, Nagi)
- Maniac (stealthy camera-type)
- MVP (athlete-type)
- Only Shining Star (solo projects)
- Otoko (gachimuchi-type)
- Re:D (hard-type)
- Shasei Triathlon
- smart (idol-type)
- Sta Tan
- Straight Style (both male and female subjects)
- S.W.A.P
- Versus
- West Gate
- Wild Biz (salaryman-type)
- Winner (athlete-type)

=== Others ===
- Exfeed

== See also ==
- Billy Herrington – his starring works became popular as "Homoneta"
