= Dai Matsumoto =

Japanese actor and voice actor

- 松本 大
- Born: June 1 Tokyo, Japan
- Occupations: Actor; voice actor; narrator
- Agent: Haikyō

Dai Matsumoto (松本 大, Matsumoto Dai; born June 1), also credited Hiroshi Matsumoto, is a Japanese actor, voice actor and narrator from Tokyo. His major roles include Dokugakuji in Saiyuki, Felix Aaron Thenardier in Lord Marksman and Vanadis, and Soichiro Sakurada the patriarch of the Sakurada family in Castle Town Dandelion.

== Filmography ==
=== Anime roles ===
2000

- Saiyuki (Dokugakuji)

2002

- Inuyasha (Serina and Suzuna's father, Izumo, and Gyu-Oh)
- RahXephon* Donny Wong

2003

- Rockman EXE Axess (Gorou Misaki, BeastMan)

2004

- Alice Academy (Jinno)
- Mobile Suit Gundam SEED Destiny (Unato Ema Saran)
- Naruto (Fugaku Uchiha)
- Rockman EXE Stream (Gorou Misaki, BeastMan)
- This Ugly yet Beautiful World (Itchō Nishino)

2005

- Guyver: The Bioboosted Armor (Sin Rubeo Amniculus)
- Ginga Legend Weed (Tōbē)
- He Is My Master (Sawatari Father)
- Karin (Henry Marker)
- MÄR (Halloween)

2006

- Bleach: Memories of Nobody (Jai)

2007

- Kaze no Stigma (Ryuuya Kazamaki)
- Shooting Star Rockman Tribe (Hyde)

2009

- Fullmetal Alchemist: Brotherhood (Older Slicer brother)

2010

- Bakugan Battle Brawlers: Gundalian Invaders (Coredem)

2012

- Naruto Shippuden (Jinpachi Munashi)

2014

- Lord Marksman and Vanadis (Felix Aaron Thenardier)

2015

- Castle Town Dandelion (Sōichirō Sakurada)

2020

- Boruto: Naruto Next Generations (Benga)

=== Video games ===
- Armored Core: Last Raven (Wanton Busker)
- Castlevania: The Dracula X Chronicles (Shaft)
- Midnight Club: Street Racing (Larry Muller)
- Halo 2 (Arbiter)
- Myst V (Esher)
- Star Ocean: The Second Story (Zadkiel/Ruprecht)
- Valkyrie Profile 2: Silmeria (Heimdall)

=== Tokusatsu ===
- Super Sentai World (Emperor Daidas)
- Ninja Sentai Kakuranger (Kakure Daishogun, Tsubasamaru)
- Mechanical Violator Hakaider (Hakaider (Ryo played by Yuji Kishimoto))
- Chōriki Sentai Ohranger (Boss)
- Juukou B-Fighter (Black Dragon (ep. 10), Gun Gibson (ep. 52 - 53))
- Choukou Senshi Changéríon (Ginger (ep. 1))
- B-Robo Kabutack (Cobrander)
- Kyuukyuu Sentai GoGoFive (Supersonic Psyma Beast Blowgene (ep. 15))
- Mirai Sentai Timeranger (Extortionist Keys (ep. 3))
- Hyakujuu Sentai Gaoranger (Bulldozer Org (ep. 10))
- Bakuryuu Sentai Abaranger (Haematsu (ep. 25))
- Ultraman Mebius (Jasyuline (Elder brother (voiced by Shintarou Asanuma (Middle brother) and Haji (Youngest brother)) (ep. 37))
- Juken Sentai Gekiranger (Confrontation Beast Archer fish-Fist Pouōte (ep. 27))
- Samurai Sentai Shinkenger (Ayakashi Dokurobou (ep. 29))
- Kamen Rider OOO (Unicorn Yummy (ep. 35 - 36))
- Kaizoku Sentai Gokaiger (Osogain (ep. 18))
- Space Sheriff Gavan: The Movie (Zan Vardo)
- Kamen Rider Ex-Aid (Alhambra Bugster (ep. 2, 13 - 14, 25 - 26))

=== Dubbing ===
==== Film ====
- 200 Cigarettes (Bartender (Ben Affleck))
- The 40-Year-Old Virgin (Jay (Romany Malco))
- Billy Madison (Frank (Norm Macdonald))
- Das Boot (1st Watch Officer (Hubertus Bengsch))
- Fantastic Four (2008 NTV edition) (Jimmy O'Hoolihan (Kevin McNulty))
- A Good Man (Vladimir (Claudiu Bleonț))
- Hit and Run (Quarantine Dude (Joe Hansard))
- Last Chance Harvey (Brian (James Brolin))
- Love in the Afternoon (DVD edition) (Michel (Van Doude))

==== Television ====
- The Adventures of Shirley Holmes (Ray Wong (Mig Macario))
- Conan the Adventurer (Gokrey (Michael Bailey Smith), The Skull That Talks (Arthur Burghardt))
- ER (Nurse Malik McGrath (Deezer D))
- She-Wolf of London (Policeman)
- Tales from the Neverending Story (Rip Rowdy (Greg Kramer))

==== Animation ====
- Batman: the Animated Series (Count Vertigo)
- Batman: the Brave and the Bold (Black Manta)
- George of the Jungle (Ape named Ape)
- Shrek Forever After (Pig #2)
