= Kazuhito Tadano =

Japanese baseball player (born 1980)

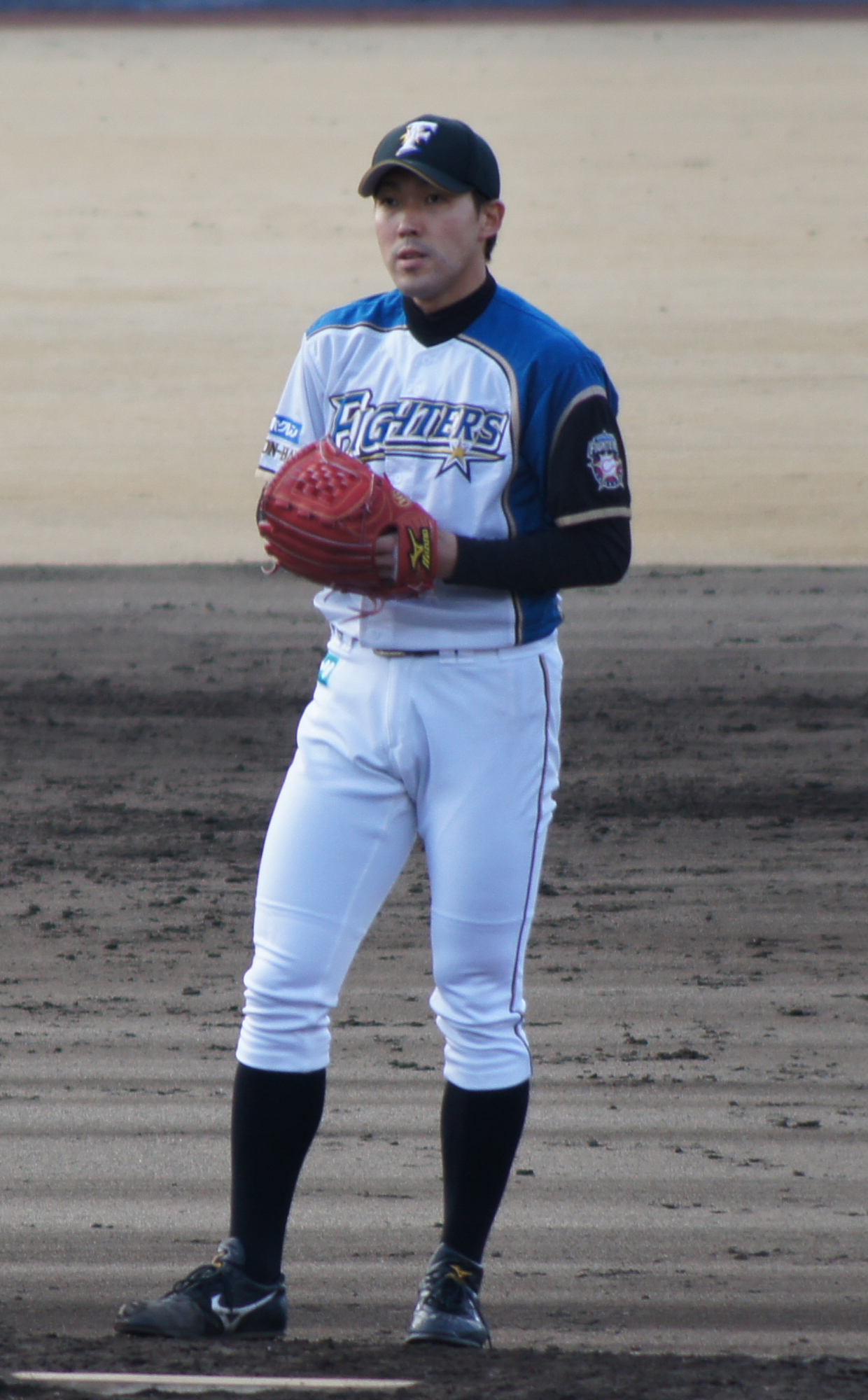
- Pitcher / Pitching coach
- Born: April 25, 1980 (age 46); Tokyo, Japan
- Batted: Right Threw: Right

Professional debut
- MLB: April 27, 2004, for the Cleveland Indians
- NPB: May 2, 2008, for the Hokkaido Nippon-Ham Fighters

Last appearance
- MLB: July 16, 2005, for the Cleveland Indians
- NPB: July 11, 2014, for the Hokkaido Nippon-Ham Fighters

MLB statistics
- Win–loss record: 1–1
- Earned run average: 4.47
- Strikeouts: 40

NPB statistics
- Win–loss record: 18–20
- Earned run average: 4.43
- Strikeouts: 187
- Stats at Baseball Reference

Teams
- As player: Cleveland Indians (2004–2005); Tokushima Indigo Socks (2006); Hokkaido Nippon-Ham Fighters (2008–2014); Ishikawa Million Stars (2015–2017); As coach: Hokkaido Nippon-Ham Fighters farm team (2022)

Kazuhito Tadano (多田野 数人, Tadano Kazuhito; born April 25, 1980) is a Japanese former professional baseball pitcher. He played in Major League Baseball (MLB) for the Cleveland Indians, and in Nippon Professional Baseball (NPB) for the Hokkaido Nippon-Ham Fighters. He is currently the pitching coach for the Fighters' farm team in the Eastern League.

== Early life and education ==
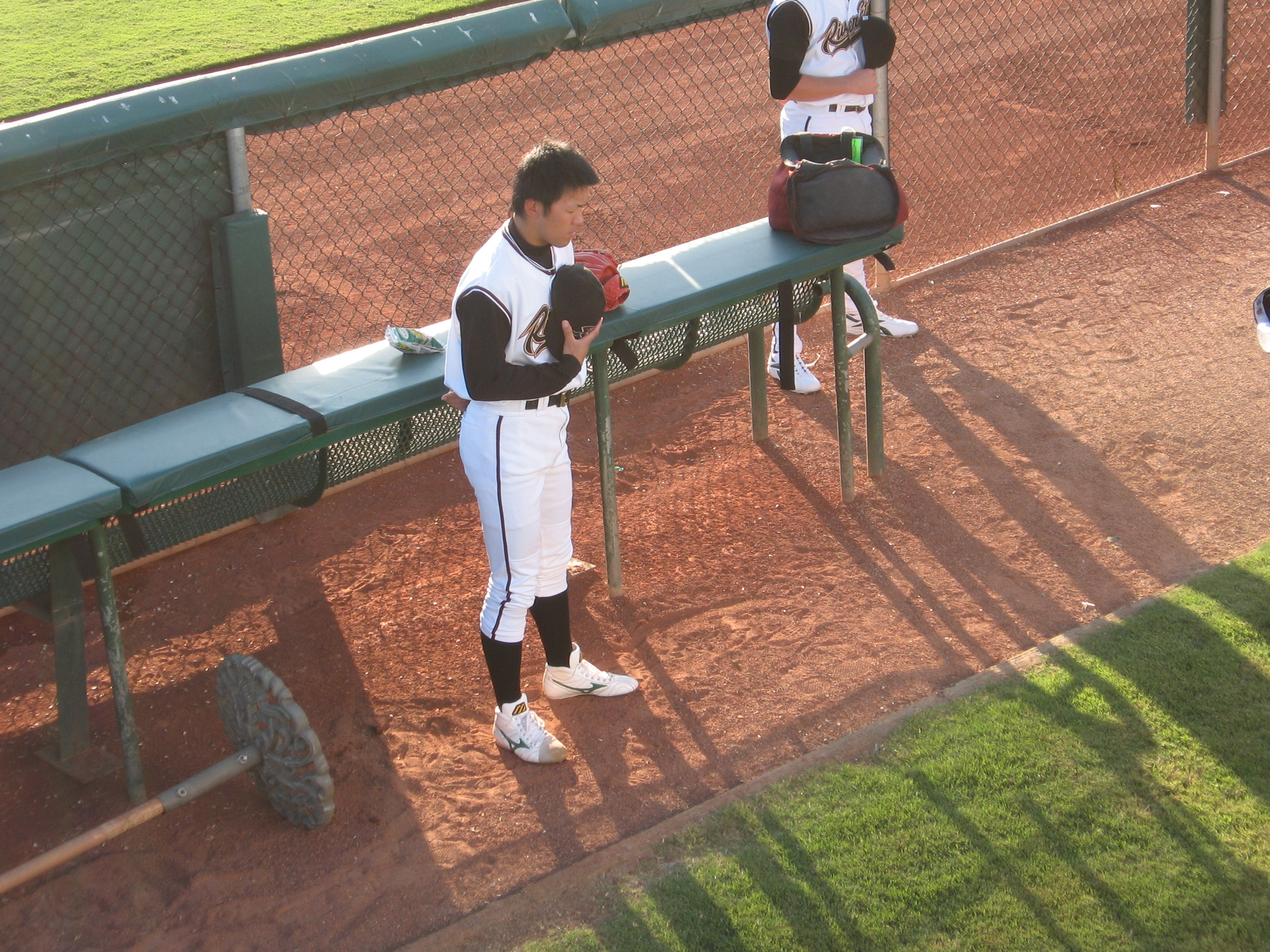
Tadano in 2006

Tadano was the ace pitcher for Yachiyo Shoin High School, and led the school to the summer Koshien tournament for the first time. He was a highly regarded pitcher coming out of Rikkyo University and was expected to be a high draft pick in the Nippon Professional Baseball draft in 2002. However, no Japanese team drafted him due to a gay porn video scandal; he ultimately left Japan.

== Career ==
=== 2000s ===
The Cleveland Indians signed Tadano as a free agent in 2003, and he rose through the Cleveland farm system, making his debut in 2004. He made 14 appearances and four starts with a 4.65 ERA in 50⅓ innings. In January 2004, it was widely reported in America that Tadano was featured in a gay porn video A Midsummer Night's Lewd Dream (真夏の夜の淫夢, Manatsu No Yo No Inmu), three years previously, with Tadano appearing at a press conference organized by the team. Tadano said, "I was young, playing baseball, and going to college and my teammates and I needed money."

He was sidelined due to an injury early in the 2005 season, but recovered and was shuttled between Cleveland and the Buffalo Bisons for the rest of the year.

On April 4, 2006, Tadano was traded to the Oakland Athletics for outfielder Ramon Alvarado.

In 2007, Tadano was sent down to Oakland's Double-A team, Midland, after being invited to spring training. He was eventually promoted back up to Triple-A and started off well, looking sharp with a plus splitter. Curiously, he ran into trouble in June. His ERA ballooned as he gave up 29 runs over 5 games. He was moved to the bullpen in July after Oakland demoted Colby Lewis and Shane Komine.

In 2007, he was the 1st pick by the Nippon Ham Fighters in the university/company player draft. He would become one of the last players of the Matsuzaka Generation to start his NPB career. He missed the start of the 2008 season with an injury.

=== 2010s ===
In 2012, he played in his first Nippon Series against the Yomiuri Giants. However, he was thrown out of the game because he was judged to have thrown a bean ball at Ken Katoh, the Giants' catcher. He is the first pitcher to be thrown out of the game for a dangerous pitch in Nippon Series, though his pitch did not hit Katoh.
