= List of Lord Marksman and Vanadis characters =

The Lord Marksman and Vanadis light novel series features an extensive cast of characters created by Tsukasa Kawaguchi and illustrated by Yoshi☆o and Hinata Katagiri. The series takes place in an alternate version of Europe, where wars are waged to maintain peace and equality. The protagonist of the series is Tigrevurmud Vorn, a Count from the Brune principality of Alsace who is taken prisoner by Zhcted war maiden Eleonora Viltaria. Tigre, Elen, and their allies interact with various groups and organizations, which some are involved in civil wars.

== Creation and development ==
Author Tsukasa Kawaguchi contributed the concept of a young male archer and a female fighter who uses a sword as the protagonists, which the editorial department of MF Bunko J approved of. At the editorial department's suggestion, Kawaguchi included seven additional fighting girls and called them "war maidens". Kawaguchi wanted to have another weapon from a novel he had previously worked on for Tigre. The Monster Hunter video game franchise gave Kawaguchi the inspiration to develop Tigre's archery skills. Other influences for Tigre included historical archers such as Nasu no Yoichi and Robin Hood.^{[LN 1 afterword]}

Kawaguchi cites Record of Lodoss War, Fortune Quest as well as foreign and domestic light novels in writing Lord Marksman and Vanadis. When creating the names of the Vanadis, he used Russian names as he based Zhcted on that country. On deciding a good name for a character, Kawaguchi said that he first decides on a common name, as he feels that it might be hard for readers to understand strange names. After deciding on what the character's name means, Kawaguchi thinks of the name's quality based on if they have an active role.

== Characters ==
=== Major characters ===
Main characters as found in the anime series.

Tigrevurmud "Tigre" Vorn (ティグルヴルムド=ヴォルン, Tiguruvurumudo Vorun)
Voiced by: Kaito Ishikawa (Japanese); Joel McDonald (English)
Tigre is the protagonist of Lord Marksman and Vanadis. Introduced as the Count of Alsace, he is an archer who enjoys hunting. After he is summoned to lead Brune Army in the Battle of Dinant, Eleonora Viltaria obliterates the army before capturing Tigre and detaining him in Leitmeritz. Shortly after, he becomes one of Elen's generals.^{[LN 1]} His actions in rescuing Alsace results in him being stripped of his title as Count and is considered a traitor.^{[LN 3]} When Tigre defeats Duke Felix Aaron Thenadier, he becomes a hero to the populaces of Brune and Zhcted, regaining his title as a Count and obtained two titles, Lumiere (Knight of the Moonlight) and Silvrash (Star Shooter).^{[LN 5]} He is soon ambushed by the demon Torbalan, which results in him losing his memory in the process. He takes on the name Urs after his father and is taken in by Elizaveta Fomina during his amnesia state.^{[LN 7]} Eventually, he regains his memories during his battle with Baba Yaga when he meets up with Elen again.^{[LN 10]} After rescuing Elen from Greast, he professes his love for her and they later defeat the advancing Muozinel Army.^{[LN 13]}^{[LN 14]}
His main item is the Black Bow (黒弓, Kuroyumi), which is a bow used by his ancestors.^{[LN 1]}^{[S1 ep 2]} He can shoot up to three arrows at once with it.^{[S1 ep 2]} Using Elen's Arifar, he is able to amplify his ability to. the point where it can obliterate gates.^{[S1 ep 5]}

=== War maidens ===
Eleonora "Elen" Viltaria (エレオノーラ=ヴィルターリア, Ereonōra Virutāria)
Voiced by: Haruka Tomatsu (Japanese); Caitlin Glass (English)
Elen (エレン, Eren) is one of the seven title characters; she captures and takes Tigrevurmud Vorn as her prisoner shortly after witnessing his archery skills.^{[LN 1]} She has long white hair and red eyes.^{[LN 1 cover]} She is the ruler of the bustling principality of Leitmeritz and leader of their army.^{[S1 ep 1]} She is also known as the Danseuse of the Sword (Note: 剣の舞姫(メルティス), Merutisu; lit. 'sword dancer') and Wind Princess of the Silver Flash (Note: 銀閃の風姫(シルヴフラウ), Shiruvu Furau). Having mastered the Dragon Gear longsword Arifal, (Note: アリファール, Arifāru) she can use the wind to cut down through shields, helms, armors and dragons at will, and Arifar seems to have a consciousness of its own.^{[LN 1]}^{[LN 2]} Besides her combat abilities she is also an excellent tactician, able to defeat numerically superior forces with clever stratagems and making full use of any advantages her forces have over those of her opponents. Her preference is to use cavalry to flank the enemy while fighting in the front lines herself. She is accompanied by her pet Black dragon Lunie, whom Sofya Obertas is very fond of. During her early childhood, she is raised by the mercenary group "Silver Gale" and saves Elizaveta Fomina from ridicule.^{[LN 10]}
During Zhcted's invasion of Brune, Elen and her army overpowers the Brune Army and captures Tigre. She eventually recruits him into her army.^{[LN 1]} After the Brune Civil War she agrees to keep Tigre in her custody for three years as a way of maintaining the peace between the Kingdoms of Zhcted and Brune, although her ulterior motive is to keep him close so that the other girls will not steal him away from her. She is tasked by King Viktor to stop the fight between Count Pardu and Duke Bydgauche, and is forced to work with Liza, encountering the amnesiac Tigre in the process.^{[LN 8]} Despite her statements about Tigre's actual identity, she and Liza begin to battle but Tigre is able to defuse the situation and they agree to work together. When Lim confirms Tigre's true identity, Elen leaves for Lebus and helps Tigre, Liza and Lim battle Baba Yaga and Vodyanoy. When she becomes exhausted during the fight, Tigre hugs her and eventually regains his memories. She helps Liza kill the Earl of Polus as thanks for taking care of Tigre, before they reconcile and Liza becomes Tigre's ally.^{[LN 10]} During her campaign on Brune, she is captured by Greast after the Battle of Prowirl but later rescued by Tigre; both of them profess their feelings together after Elen suffers mental trauma due to Greast's torture.^{[LN 13]}
Ludmila "Mila" Lourie (リュドミラ=ルリエ, Ryudomira Rurie)
Voiced by: Mariya Ise (Japanese); Jad Saxton (English)
Mila is one of the seven war maidens of Zhcted, as well as the ruler of the snowy principality Olmütz, known as the Snow Princess of the Frozen Wave (Note: 凍漣の雪姫（ミーチェリア）, Mīcheria; alt. Snow Princess of the Frozen Ripple). She has short blue hair, blue eyes and a slim figure.^{[LN 2 cover]} As with Eleonora Viltaria, she is a tactician and even she reluctantly concedes that Mila is the best war maiden in fighting defensive battles. Before the beginning of the series, Mila becomes a war maiden after her mother dies when she is 14 years old. Unlike most Vanadis who are chosen by the Dragon Gear almost at random, her Dragon Gear has been passed from generation to generation of her family since the time of her great grandmother, which explains her pride as a war maiden.
At first, she is antagonistic towards Elen and Tigre because of the alliance between her family and that of Thenardier's.^{[S1 ep 4]} During her duel with Elen in the Tatra Fortress, Tigre saves Mila's life from an assassin sent by Thenardier and she declares her neutrality in the Civil War of Brune.^{[LN 2]} She returns to help Tigre and his army to fend off the invading Muozinel Army. She gets jealous whenever other girls want to steal Tigre away.^{[LN 4]} However during Tigre's disappearance she received a gift from Tigre after his dispatch on Asvarre which was a pack of Black Tea much to her surprise and mumbling about his foolishness and recklessness.^{[LN 9]} Later she participate by aiding Tigre again in rescuing Eleonora and helps stop the Muozinel Army from conquering Nice.^{[LN 14]}
Her Dragon Gear is a short spear named Lavias, capable of manipulating ice, its abilities include summoning thousands of ice shards that can easily stab to death many attackers, creating a wall of ice, changing the weather to winter and also being capable of slaying a Dragon at full power.^{[LN 2]}^{[LN 5]} Mila is a fan of drinking tea with jelly and almost always carries a small jar with her. She is mocked by Elen as a "potato" because of her modest bust size and height, which usually leads both of them to get in childish quarrels that have to be mediated by Sofya Obertas.^{[S1 ep 4]} She is also teased by Elen for her feelings towards Tigre.
Sofya "Sofy" Obertas (ソフィーヤ=オベルタス, Sofīya Oberutasu)
Voiced by: Ai Kayano (Japanese); Morgan Garrett (English)
Sofy is the one of seven war maidens of Zhcted, ruler of the land of Polesia, she is 20 years old and the current mediator and moral guardian to all Vanadis. She has long blonde hair, beryl (green) colored eyes and a well endowed body, even more than Elen.^{[LN 3 cover]} Called Brilliant Princess of the Light Flower, Sofy dislikes violence and upholds her role to take care of her fellow Vanadis from unwanted conflict.^{[LN 3]} Elen considers her the best Vanadis at politics and information gathering, and has even asked her to seek information out such as which Vanadis have ties with Thenardier and Ganelon, as well as how strong those ties are. This was after Sofy reveals that how siding with Tigre makes her an enemy with Ludmila Lourie, whose family has ties with since her grandmother. She also upholds the principle that the Vanadis should not put emotions ahead of country affairs until Tigre's arrival, which leads her curiosity to deepen after she sees Elen and Mila's odd relationship with him.^{[LN 3]} This especially increases to the point she's questioning her feelings for him after he rides to her rescue under circumstances which should be impossible after being held for a while by Prince Elliott. Of all the Vanadis, Sofy is the sole Vanadis that serves as both warrior and ambassador for Zhcted. Sofy rarely fights unless necessary and she is often away from her territory since she is also a court member of the Royal Palace. If it is necessary to fight she can do so with power on equal terms with Elen and Mila, but due to her poorer stamina can't last as long.
Her Dragon Gear is a golden priestess staff named Zaht. Though seemingly not a dangerous weapon, Zaht holds immense power that even functions as an energy shield capable of repelling any weapon, although powerful artifacts such as other Dragon Gears or the likes of (Durandal) can damage or break through the shield. Sofy's Vanadis powers are light-based which can be brighter than sunlight able to blind her enemies who've gotten too close to her when used. Her light power also has healing properties. Due to her personality and Zaht's non-aggressive appearance, she tends to travel often as an ambassador, diplomat, or observer for the King. While investigating for a way of defeating demons, she comes across the legend of the King of the Magic Marksman and how its path could turn into either a hero, or the Demon King.
Alexandra "Sasha" Alshavin (アレクサンドラ=アルシャーヴィン, Arekusandora Arushāvin)
Voiced by: Mikako Komatsu (Japanese); Carli Mosier (English)
Sasha is the oldest, but also the strongest of the current war maidens, as proof she was able to easily defeat three other war maidens by herself. She has shoulder length black hair, dark blue eyes and a modest physique. ^{[LN 4 cover]} The ruler of Legnica, and called Princess of the Dancing Blades and Hidden Princess of the Luminous Flame, she is a Mediator for the other war maidens before the beginning of the series, until her illness forces her to retire and give the title to Sofya Obertas.^{[LN 5]} Eleonora Viltaria considers her best friend among the war maidens, and vows to help each other in times of need. She suffers from an unknown blood illness that was diagnosed in her childhood. This disease has afflicted all women in her family for generations, no woman in her family has lived for more than 30 years. This illness is what makes her vulnerable to her adversaries, forcing her to remain bedridden as her illness worsens.
Her Dragon Gear is Bargan, which consists of twin daggers with the power to control fire.^{[LN 6]} Although the daggers share the same name as a pair it seems that instead of sharing the same will like a group/hive mind each dagger has its own individual (albeit very similar) will. The daggers refuse to abandon her even as her condition worsened and she tried to make them leave her and find a new owner. She decides to face the pirate army of the demon Torbalan that was going to attack her land, despite knowing that fighting will only make the disease worse. She fights with Torbalan in single combat, and after he nearly kills Elizaveta Fomina, she burns him with the power of her Dragon Gear. She finally succumbs to her illness after returning from the battle, as she used what was left of her strength in the fight. Before her death, she professes to Elen her desire to have a child.^{[LN 7]}
Elizaveta "Liza" Fomina (エリザヴェータ=フォミナ, Erizavēta Fomina)
Voiced by: Yu Kobayashi (Japanese); Lauren Landa (English)
Liza is the war maiden of Lebus. She is 17 years old, and she is referred as Rainbow Eyes and Princess of the Thunder Swirl. With a hot-headed personality and a very strong ambition, she vows to defeat Eleonora Viltaria and become the strongest war maiden, going as far as invading Sasha's territory to provoke her and measure their strengths. She has long scarlet hair, a well endowed body and heterochromia; her left eye is blue, her right eye is yellow and she is very sensitive about them.^{[LN 7 cover]}
Her Dragon Gear is a whip named Valitsaif that can create, manipulate lightning and generate electricity to stun her enemies. This weapon can change form between a rod and a long whip.
Born as the illegitimate child of a corrupt aristocrat, she lives in poverty for most of her childhood where she was ridiculed due to her heterochromia, which is considered a bad omen. Elen saves Liza, but upon meeting again several years later, she is unable to remember the encounter, much to Liza's dismay. While dealing with a village with an infested plague, Liza burns the village, while isolating those exposed, but Elen has a connection to that village and desires to help more, despite Liza offering assistance to those infected. Liza's father, Rodion Abt, begins to fight other nobles and pockets the taxes of his people, so when the king tasks Elen with subjugating him, Liza volunteers in her place. But after Rodion decides to escape, he is captured and killed by Elen. Afterwards she challenges Elen to a duel, but is easily defeated. The stress and the feeling of powerlessness leads her to the lair of the demon witch Baba Yaga, who grants her some power, but after seeing the dangers of it, she refuses to use it anymore.
Years later, she saves Sasha's life from Torbalan's attempted invasion of Legnica. Later, Liza discovers an amnesiac Tigre, when leaving Legnica, and, impressed by his bow skills, decides to make him her aide. She grows fond of him, as he becomes her first subordinate she has personally chosen. When she is tasked by King Viktor to stop the fighting between Count Pardu and Duke Bydgauche, she takes Tigre with him, encountering Elen. Liza declines Elen's offer to return Tigre to her and they are forced to work together at Tigre's request. Liza does not want him to go their separate ways, especially since he is probably the only man around her to say his true feelings about her eyes and his attempts to protect her from being ridiculed.
However, Baba Yaga provokes her nightmares and forces her to come to her cave, while demanding the power she gave her back. They are attacked by a Two-headed Dragon and despite her best efforts, she is unable to kill the beast, but Tigre recovers his Bow and kills the Dragon. Baba Yaga stabs her right arm from behind, disarming her, and nearly succeeds in taking the power, but using the last of her strength she forces the demon to escape once she uses her strongest Dragonic Skill. With Urs unconscious, she ends up separated from him. After returning she decides to find Baba Yaga by herself. Once Baba Yaga overpowers her, Tigre arrives to save her and to prove the witch that she does not need her power, he shoots her in the arm, making her recover her resolve and trust in Valitsaif. She finds hope when Tigre tells her that she is also very important to him. Eventually, Liza reconciles with Elen and has Tigre become her mediator. She's slowly recovering the strength of her right arm as Tigre ask about her arm which he confirms about it during Sun Festival.^{[LN 11]}
Valentina "Tina" Glinka Estes (ヴァレンティナ=グリンカ=エステス, Varentina Gurinka Esutesu)
Voiced by: Hitomi Harada (Japanese); Monica Rial (English)
Tina is the war maiden of Osterode. She is the most mysterious and less understood of the Seven, even her origins are unknown to the other six war maidens. She has long navy blue hair and purple eyes with a voluptuous figure that rivals even Sofy.^{[LN 5 cover]} Despite having an easy going and happy personality, she is in fact a cunning and ambitious war maiden. Called the Illusionary Princess of the Hollow Shadow, she is 20 years old. An avid reader, she has been fascinated with tales since her childhood. Having grown up in a poor land, Valentina dedicates several years to improve the condition of her principality, using her skills as a politician to increase her power and influence among the nobility. Her Dragon Gear is a scythe named Ezendeis, which has the unknown power of the void and shadows, and allows her to travel anywhere at will, and although she says using that power is exhausting, Sofy suspects her ambitions.
Valentina develops an interest in Tigre after seeing the change in Elen and Mila's personalities, using the power of her scythe to spy him. Following the Brune Civil War, Valentina joins Ganelon and Greast after Ganelon fakes his death, while she offers them shelter. The reason for her alliance with the former Brune aristocrat is to cause turmoil in Brune to weaken the Regin's reign, and force the war maiden of Leitmeritz, Elen to intervene and make sure she does not interfere with her plans.
Her ultimate goal is to become the Queen of Zhcted. She suggests King Viktor to give Tigre the mission of going to Asvarre so she can meet him without any other war maidens around to determine if she could tempt him to become her partner, but Sasha intervenes. The reason of why she has two names comes from the fact that, unlike most war maidens, who were born commoners, she is born an aristocrat; the Estes family descends from the royal family of Zhcted, which means that, although few, she has a chance of ascending to the throne, and is willing to deceive and manipulate the other persons in the line of succession, such as tricking Eugene and Ilda into fighting each other, to increase those chances.
While she helps Tigre and Elen win an important victory against the Sachstein Army, her tactics make Tigre, Elen and Lim doubt her reliability and intentions. Despite her intentions of using Tigre, Valentina ends up rescuing Vorn from Ganelon, but remaining uninvolved in his plans.^{[LN 12]}
Olga Tamm (オルガ=タム, Oruga Tamu)
Olga is the war maiden of Brest. She is 14 years old, the youngest of the current Seven war maiden. She has short pink hair, dark black (obsidian) eyes and a petite body.^{[LN 6 cover]} Olga became a war maiden when she was 12 years old, born as the granddaughter of the patriarch of a family from the grassland tribes. When she realizes the extent of the world, she decides to travel around the world to learn how to become a better war maiden, only leaving behind a note to her subordinates, which means that she has been away of her territory for more than a year. She meets Tigre during his journey to the Asvarre Kingdom and becomes his companion and even volunteers in becoming his attendant to meet Prince Germaine. Sometimes she seems absent-minded and expressionless, but she is a caring, hardworking and sincere girl.
Her Dragon Gear is an axe named Muma, that is capable of changing its size and shape and controlling the earth. Even without her Dragon Gear, she can easily defeat soldiers twice her height with her strength, and she's also very good at riding and hunting, but had never experienced the battlefield before. She also develops affection for Tigre, as he acts with the manners of a king in her eyes, as well as saving her from a demon. Although worried about Tigre's disappearance, Olga decides to return to Brest to resume her duties as war maiden, with Sofy as company.
When finally reunited with Tigre at the Sun Festival, she tells him her wish of having his child, to the utter shock of Elen, Lim, Mila, Sofy, Liza and Titta, but Tigre manages to convince her of waiting for four more years before she can propose to him again.
Figneria "Finé" Alshavin (フィグネリア=アルシャーヴィン, Figuneria Arushāvin)
Finé is Sasha's successor and the new wielder of Bargen. She is 25 years old, the oldest known war maiden, despite being the youngest serving. She has long black hair, golden eyes and an average physique with a large bust. ^{[LN 12 cover]} Formerly an itinerary mercenary, she was acquainted with the Silver Gale, the mercenary group that adopted Elen, and is surprised and eager of re-encountering the Silver Wind war maiden. ^{[LN 11]} She befriends Vissarion, Elen's mentor, unfortunately the two find themselves fighting on opposite sides and Figneria kills him, causing the dissolution of Silver Gale after their leaders death.^{[LN 12]}
Despite her initial doubts and lack of experience, after testing the twin daggers she accepts her new role as ruler. Later she gains interest to Tigre after she learns about him via Liza and Valentina's accounts during their meeting at Silesia.

=== Zhcted Kingdom ===
"Lim" Limalisha (リムアリーシャ, Rimuarīsha)
Voiced by: Yuka Iguchi (Japanese); Alex Moore (English)
Lim is Elen's second in command and bodyguard. At 18 years old, she is tall, has long blonde hair tied with a ponytail at one side and blue eyes, despite her slim figure, her chest is rather large. Upon meeting Tigrevrumud Vorn, Lim is distrusting of him for his close relationship with Elen, that may have supposed the Silver Wind war maiden position and reputation in Zhcted being affected. Her attitude towards him changes as she gets to know him, such as finding out he refuses Elen's request to join her honestly because he feels a duty towards Alsace and because he feels that Elen is being honest in her offer. This continues until Tigre immediately treats her for poisoning after getting bitten by a snake during an ambush, and Lim suffers a dilemma, because she is uncertain if forming a close relationship with him may endanger her friend Elen's happiness due to being fond of him too. Although she attempts to maintain their usual relationship, her affection for him occasionally shows in various ways, usually getting teased by Elen for it, and still seems unsure of how to act on her feelings.
Although she has a mostly serious demeanor, she has a weakness for cute things, especially for teddy bears, and being teased for her large chest which Tigre and Elen often uses Teddy bear as a bribe to ease her rage. She also acts like a girl her age whenever something involved with boys, usually Tigre, comes to topic. She has also taken it upon herself to help teach Tigre some experience and tips about combat as well as the history of Zhcted to help him be a better commander and avoid embarrassing himself. She is tasked by Elen into going to Lebus and confirm if Urz is indeed Tigre, with Titta and Mashas as company. Once reunited with Tigre, she asks him if he wishes to live as Tigre or as Urz, and decides to accompany him to save Elizavetta Fomina. When Tigre regains his memories, Lim assists in overpowering Orgelt Kazakov's forces.
Rurick (ルーリック, Rūrikku; alt. Ryurik)
Voiced by: Kazuyuki Okitsu (Japanese); Ricco Fajardo (English)
Rurick is a 21-year-old knight under Elen's service. He was Zhcted's best archer until he met Tigre, who was capable of shooting an assassin from more than 300 meters away despite being given a poor bow, impressing Rurick and all the other archers. He is sentenced to death for his action of giving Tigre a poor bow, but Tigre insisted for his pardon. Impressed by his humbleness and mercy, he shaves his head as a sign of repentance and becomes Tigre's friend and one of his closest aides during the war.
Viktor Artur Volk Estes Tsar Zhcted (ヴィクトール=アルトゥール=ヴォルク=エステス=ツァー=ジスタート, Vikutōru Arutūru Voruku Esutesu Tsā Jisutāto)
Voiced by: Katsumi Cho (Japanese); Jim White (English)
Viktor is the King of Zhcted, a man in his sixties. As with his predecessors, Viktor fears the seven war maidens and always tries to ensure they do not become more powerful than him. Worried that his son, Prince Roslan, might not be able to succeed him, he decides to nominate the husband of his niece and old friend Eugene as the future king. When he finds out that his nephew Ilda is planning to attack Eugene, he pleads war maidens Elen and Liza to intervene, as Elen is acquainted with Eugene and Liza is acquainted with Ilda, hoping they can defuse the situation. While he distrusts Tina, he does not seem to know of her treachery. He eventually has a talk with Tigre, and asks him if he wishes to become the king of Brune. When Tigre responds in negative, he warns him that having no ambitions is also dangerous, and advises him to talk to Eugene before returning to Brune.
Matvey (マトヴェイ, Matovei)
Matvey is sailor and an acquaintance of Alexandra Alshavin. Captain of the Proud Beluga, he accompanies Tigre and Olga in their mission to the Kingdom of Asvarre, mainly as a translator. He chooses to remain at Sasha's side during the battle against the pirate army of the demon Torbalan.
Naum (ナウム, Naumu)
Naum is a veteran knight at the service of Elizaveta Fomina. He is initially distrustful of Tigre, as he is concerned that the reputation of Liza will be affected by choosing him as her aide. After some time he begins trusting Tigre and vice versa, and tells Tigre the history between Elen and Liza.
Eugene Shevarin (ユージェン=シェヴァーリン, Yūjen Shevārin)
Eugene is the Count of Pardu and a 45-year-old man. He was Elen and Lim's mentor in etiquette when Elen became a war maiden years before the series present. He's married and has a daughter. His wife is Viktor's niece and the younger sister of Ilda, this makes him eighth in the line to the throne. He is surprisingly nominated by Viktor to be his successor when he dies. According to Viktor, it is because he trusts him and was one of his closest aides, also, because of his tenacious and steady diplomatic negotiations with Brune that Viktor decides to nominate him. When he tries to improve his relations with Ilda by giving him vodka, on the war maiden of Osterode's advice, Tina switches it with a poisoned one to make Ilda think that Eugene has attempted to kill him, which causes him to mobilize his army to defend his land from Ilda, who did so as well. After Ilda is defeated, he thanks Eleonora and tells her his awkward position as the future king. Since his situation is similar, he asks Tigre to look after Elen and Lim.
Ilda Krutis (イルダー=クルーティス, Irūda Kurūtis)
Ilda is the Duke of Bydgauche, Victor's nephew and a 34-year-old man. Seventh in the line to the throne, Ilda is an acquaintance of Liza and Tina. He has an estranged relationship with his sister, Eugene's wife, and has issues with his brother-in-law. Although he is asked by his uncle to support Eugene, he is unable to stop wondering why Victor skips him in the line of succession, knowing Eugene has no such ambition whatsoever. He is tricked by Tina into telling her Viktor's plans regarding Eugene. He is also tricked by Tina into believing Eugene's attempt to poison him, so he mobilizes his army to invade Pardu and kill the Earl in revenge. He personally faces Elen and Liza and fights both until his sword breaks, and his escape is halted by Tigre. He is captured and forced to return to his homeland while being escorted by Liza, but before separating he recognizes Tigre's incredible skills.
Lazarl (ラザール, Lazaru)
Lazarl is an elder civil servant of Lebus. Distrusting of Tigre, he assigns him as a mediator in a dispute between two villages. Much to his surprise, Tigre proved to be a very capable mediator, solving the dispute peacefully. He is later asked by Liza to investigate the temples of Baba Yaga.
Orgelt Kazakov (オルゲルト=カザコフ, Orugeruto Kazakofu)
Kazakov is the count of his homeland Polus. Nicknamed Bloody Kazakov for his skill with the mace, he irrationally resents Elizavetta Fomina and her "Rainbow-Eyes", and blames her for the corruption of her father Rodion Abt. He is easily tricked by Ganelon into invading Lebus, using as an excuse recovering Tigre for Leitmeritz. However, Tigre and Elen lead the Lebus people into overpowering Kazakov's army. Kazakov decides to challenge Liza when Elen intervenes and decapitates him. With Kazakov's death, Tina gains the support of the nobles who have distanced themselves from his House after his demise.

=== Brune Kingdom ===
Titta (ティッタ, Titta)
Voiced by: Sumire Uesaka (Japanese); Tia Ballard (English)
Titta is Tigre's 15-year-old maid and the only servant in his small mansion at Alsace. She has chestnut color hair with two small ponytails, hazel eyes and a modest physique. She has served the Tigre since she was 11 years old and has a crush on him. Although she is not very good at fighting, she takes care of the food, clothes and other maid duties when she joins the Silver Meteor Storm to be near Tigre. When Tigre and Titta stumble upon the Death Goddess Tir na Va's temple, the disembodied goddess possesses her and tests Tigre's strength.^{[S1 ep 7]} Titta becomes a friend and confidante of Princess Regin after talking about their common interest in Tigre.^{[LN 4]} She feels that her body is not a match for Elen, Rim and Sofy's bodies. She is the only person who follows Tigre to his exile in Leitmeritz, where Elen's pet dragon, Lunie, grows fond of her. She becomes depressed after hearing about Tigre's disappearance, but recovers hope after hearing the news that he probably is alive, and decides to go to Lebus with Lim and Mashas to deduce Tigre's identity.^{[LN 9]}
Once they arrive in Lebus, they stumble on an abandoned temple and she decides to go in there and pray. Tir na Va possesses her once again and unknowingly she helps Tigre recover his bow. Despite remaining unconscious during the possession, she wakes up once the goddess leaves. After reuniting with Tigre, she openly prays to Tir na Va for the first time to help Tigre recover his bow after he leaves to look for Liza. She reunites with Tigre after defeating Baba Yaga and Kazakov's army.^{[LN 10]}
Bertrand (バートラン, Bātoran)
Voiced by: Takayuki Sugō (Japanese); Mark Stoddard (English)
Bertrand is a resident of Alsace, a man in his fifties and is Tigre's loyal general through his long acquaintance with father Urs.^{[LN 1]} He vows to risk his life to protect Tigre. He saves Tigre from an attack by Thenardier's general Steid. As he dies, Bertrand reveals how he was fortunate to have had the two of them as lords.^{[LN 5]} His death triggers Tigre to shoot the Black Bow with full power.
Mashas Rodant (マスハス=ローダント, Masuhasu Rōdanto)
Voiced by: Hajime Iijima (Japanese); John Swasey (English)
Mashas is the 55-year-old Count of Aude and Tigre's friend and ally. Urs was his best friend and he became a father figure to Tigre after Urs's death. Mashas teaches Tigre everything he knows to make him a good ruler. After the Brune Civil War he becomes a counselor in the Royal Court, often getting in arguments with his old friend Badouin.^{[LN 6]} Although skeptical at first, after being told that Tigre has been located in Lebus, he agrees to accompany Lim and Titta in their task to find out if Urs truly is Tigre. He's the first person to encounter Tigre and is disappointed that he is unable to remember him, but nonetheless chooses to accompany him in the search for Liza. After Tigre recovers his memories, Mashas tells Tigre, Elen, Lim and Titta that he's going to personally inform the king and question Viktor's action about Tigre.^{[LN 10]}
Zion Thenardier (ザイアン=テナルディエ, Zaian Tenarudie)
Voiced by: Ryōhei Kimura (Japanese); Clifford Chapin (English)
Zion is Duke Thenardier's 17-year-old ruthless son. He is dispatched by his father to destroy Alsace, Tigre's homeland, but he is defeated by the timely arrival of Tigre and Elen's army, who, despite being outnumbered, used Tigre's knowledge on the terrain to outsmart him. After Elen kills the Earth Dragon with Arifar and he is defeated in single combat by Tigre, he attempts to escape the battlefield on the Wyvern, but it gets shot down by Tigre's arrow empowered by Elen's Arifar, killing him and the Dragon.^{[LN 1]} His death made his father lose what little humanity was left in him.^{[S1 ep 4]}
Felix Aaron Thenardier (フェリックス=アーロン=テナルディエ, Ferikkusu Āron Tenarudie)
Voiced by: Dai Matsumoto (Japanese); R. Bruce Elliott (English)
Thernaidier is a 42-year-old duke. He is a cruel and ruthless man who holds a lot of political power because his wife is the niece of King Faron. Backed by the Brune Army, Thenardier abuses his power to cause people to suffer. He hates weakness and is ruthless to anyone he considers weak. Despite all of his cruelty and stern discipline, Thenardier is actually a knight of honor who fights to defend the country he loves. He also seems to be the loving family man who will stop at nothing to protect his family. However, he only looks at his family in this way. The death of his son, Zion, causes him to lose what little humanity is left in him and he intends to exact revenge on Tigre.^{[S1 ep 4]}
His insatiable thirst for power is provoked by his father, who made Felix and his siblings fight amongst themselves until only he remains. As a result, he becomes obsessed with strength and demands that only the strongest people could serve him. After a time, Thenardier begins seeing Faron as weak, which causes him to arrogantly ignore his commands and plan to usurp the throne.^{[S1 ep 13]} Thenardier is killed when Tigre shoots him through his forehead, ending the civil war.^{[LN 5]}
Maximilian Bennusa Ganelon (マクシミリアン=ベンヌッサ=ガヌロン, Makushimirian Bennussa Ganuron)
Voiced by: Nobuo Tobita (Japanese); Barry Yandell (English)
Ganelon is a ruthless duke and Thenardier's manipulative rival in his search for power. He was originally known as the demon Koschei. Like Thenardier, he has a lot of political power because his brother-in-law is Faron's nephew.^{[LN 1]} While he uses bribes and blackmail to gain more power, his only interest is in finding enjoyable ways to pass the time, which is always at the expense of others in torturous, inhumane, and sadistic ways. Not wanting to take Faron's place, Ganelon decides to declare war with Thenardier years before the events of the series, with his ultimate goal being to win the war and become more powerful. He is disloyal to Brune, and has no tolerance for betrayal or failure, which is why he intended to crush Tigre for refusing to become an obedient tool when approached. After Thenardier's death, Ganelon exiles himself, and accepts offer of asylum from the war maiden Tina.^{[LN 6]} He returns to Brune sometime later and begins plotting a rebellion to weaken Regin's rule.^{[LN 8]} Another one of Ganelon's goals are to gather enough power to overturn the world of humans and become the last of his kind.^{[LN 10]} He attacks Tigre while in the royal palace in order to test his powers, and somehow knowing about Tigre's parents, only to be forced to retreat by Tina. While no longer allies, Ganelon remained civil towards Tina. ^{[LN 12]}
Roland (ロラン, Roran)
Voiced by: Hiroki Tōchi (Japanese); Vic Mignogna (English)
Roland is the General of the Navarre Knights, and he is one of Brune's top generals. Known as the Dark Hero of Brune, Roland's loyalty and chivalry is second to none and he vowed to protect Brune from any invading army and kingdoms. Wielder of the legendary sword Durandal, he was sent by Thenardier to subjugate Tigre and his forces, without knowing Tigre's reasons for inviting the Zhcted Army to the kingdom. He was more than a match to both Elen and Sofy as his sword is capable of negating the power of the Dragonic Tools but Tigre intervenes. When he receives a combined attack from Tigre's bow, Elen's sword and Sofy's staff he is incapacitated and admits defeat. As a sign of surrender he leaves Durandal at Tigre's care and stated that as long as he possesses Durandal, no nobles will dare to fight him.
When he returns to the capital and demands an audience with King Faron, he is locked in a room by Ganelon where he is stung to death by thousands of bees. His death devastates Thenardier who considered him to be still useful. Tigre is devastated he will not be able to return Durandal to his rightful owner.
Urs Vorn (ウルス=ヴォルン, Urusu Vorun)
Voiced by: Juurouta Kosugi (Japanese); Kent Williams (English)
Urs is Tigre's father and former Count who ruled Alsace with benevolence and generosity. It is Urs's teaching about the people's bonds and connections that shaped Tigre's character. Tigre often uses his name when in disguise.
Faron Soleil Rauy Blainville de Charles (ファーロン=ソレイユ=ルイ=ブランヴィル=ド=シャルル, Fāron Soreiyu Rui Buranviru do Sharuru)
Voiced by: Takehito Koyasu (Japanese); Jason Douglas (English)
Faron is the king of Brune. He is a just and benevolent ruler, until the assumed death of his only daughter Regin, which caused him to breakdown mentally and suffer an illness that began afflicting his body and rendering him unable to keep Ganelon and Thenardier in check. It is later revealed he was being poisoned by Ganelon's minions to keep him mindbroken and ill while killing him extremely slowly. After the civil war ends, he is reunited with his daughter and formally recognizes her as a member of the Royal Family and his heir. He also congratulates Tigre and his friends for saving her and ending Thenardier and Ganelon's plans. With his dying breath, Faron gives Tigre the title of Knight of the Moonlight, a title in ancient times that was only given to a hero who became the next king of Brune, although only Badouin knows of the true meaning of the title.
Hughes Augre (ユーグ=オージェ, Yūgu Ōje)
Voiced by: Hiroshi Itō (Japanese); Charlie Campbell (English)
Hughes is the viscount of Territoire and an old acquaintance of Mashas, whom Tigre met as a child. He becomes Tigre's ally in his war against Ganelon and Thenardier after he defeats a large group of bandits that had plagued his territory. While he likes Tigre, he is not completely immune to the Brune custom of resenting bow users, and has a bad habit of neglecting Tigre's personal achievements, such as taking out a lot of bandits and especially their leaders with his archery, or attributing them to extreme luck, much to Lim's dismay.
Gerard Augre (ジェラール=オージェ, Jerāru Ōje)
Voiced by: Tomoaki Maeno (Japanese); Ian Sinclair (English)
Gerard is Hughes's son who becomes Tigre's ally along with his father. He is able to perform mental calculations very quickly and serves as a supply officer at the Silver Meteor Storm, effectively distributing food, money and weapons in times of need. Unlike his father, he is a rather sarcastic person and often gets in arguments with Rurick. He constantly tests Tigre to see if he really is worth following, even if his father will punish him severely for it. After the Civil War, he becomes Secretary of the Royal Court, being tasked with supervising the progress of the construction of an important road that will connect Brune and Zhcted as part of the peace agreement. He later become a supplier and informant of the Moonlight Knights to supply Tigre with information, supplies and troops.
Regin Estelle Loire Bastien do Charles (レギン=エステル=ロワール=バスティアン=ド=シャルル, Regin Esuteru Rowāru Basutian do Sharuru)
Voiced by: Yukiyo Fujii (Japanese); Natalie Hoover (English)
Regin is the Princess of the Brune Kingdom. The only child of King Faron and the sole heir to the throne, she is raised as a boy using the alias "Regnas" (レグナス, Regunasu), as Brune does not have a history of ruling Queens, so only a select few people know her true gender. After Zhcted's invasion of Brune, Regin fakes her death and exiles herself to Agnes. Though Thenardier and Ganelon suspect that she may still alive, they take advantage of Faron's frail health to do as they please. Tigre rescues her from soldiers of the Muozinel Army and she exposes her true identity to Tigre, Elen, Mila, Lim and Mashas after Muozinel retreats from Brune, asking for their help to regain the throne that is rightfully hers. Having met Tigre during a bird hunt in their childhood, Regin trusts the count. She seems to also have feelings for Tigre. Regin also becomes a good friend of Titta after they talking about Tigre. After the civil war ends she is reunited with her father, King Faron, who recognizes her as his heir. After her father's death, she is crowned Queen of Brune and agrees to a 3-year alliance with Zhcted to allow her to strengthen her position. She also returns Tigre into Elen's custody and later the uprising of the Royal Palace led by Melisande Thenardier fortifies her resolution.
Pierre Badouin (ピエール=ボードワン, Piēru Bōdowan)
Voiced by: Nobuyuki Hiyama (Japanese); Kaiji Tang (English)
Badouin is the Prime Minister of Brune and an old acquaintance of Mashas. He is incapable of stopping the fighting between Dukes Ganelon and Thenardier and had to warn Mashas of the king's condition. Only he knows the true meaning of the title 'Knight of the Moonlight' that was given to Tigre by the dying King Faron.
Olivier (オリビエ, Orivie)
Voiced by: Yasuaki Takumi (Japanese); Bryce Papenbrook (English)
Olivier is Roland's second in command. Unlike his commander, he is more narrow-minded as he saw the negotiations with the Silver Meteor Storm as a business. After the Civil War, he becomes the leader of the Navarre Knights, and swears allegiance to Regin.
Charon Anquetil Greast (カロン=アンクティル=グレアスト, Karon Ankutiru Greasuto)
Greast is a man in his twenties and the Marquis who works for Ganelon as a strategist. While he speaks in a friendly tone, Greast is a sadistic person who invented many cruel ways of torture and execution, including Roland's death by bee sting. He escapes Brune after the death of Thenardier alongside his master Ganelon. He later returns to Brune to weaken Regin's rule by stealing the treasure sword Durandal. While keeping his identity secret, he begins to conspire with some merchants who are discontent in the concessions that Regin has given to the Zhcted kingdom after the war. Eventually, he captures and tortures Elen, only for Mila and Tigre to rescue her. Shortly after, he is defeated by the Moonlight Knights and Donny kills him using one of his torture devices.
Steid (スティード, Sutīdo)
Voiced by: Kenji Hamada (Japanese); Marcus D. Stimac (English)
Steid is Thenardier's second in command. A serious and almost expressionless man, he is the Duke's confidant because he is able to keep his emotions in check when speaking to him. When he attempts to kill Tigre during the confrontation at the Sacred Caverns of the Palace, Bertrand takes the blow in his place. He dies when part of the cavern collapses, crushing him.
Melisande Thenardier (メリザンド=テナルディエ, Merizando Denarudieru)
Melisande is Duke Thenardier's wife and Regin's cousin, who is forgiven for the crimes that her husband committed and is forced to join a temple, since Regin is unable bring herself to order the execution of her family. ^{[LN 10]} She's a voluptuous woman around 30, with long blond hair. As with Felix, Melisande is a power hungry woman who wishes to obtain the crown by any means necessary, considering her cousin Regin unworthy of the throne, which leads her to have Sachstein invade Brune. While not directly responsible, she is aware of the theft of Durandal and its replica, so she is detained in the royal palace following her and her supporter's failure at humiliating Regin by breaking the replica during an important banquet. ^{[LN 11]} Released from imprisonment by her supporter Viscount Armand, she leads the rebels in pursuit of Regin, cornering her in the throne room. However, Tigre rescues Regin by killing Armand and most of her soldiers. She attacks Regin with a fragment of the fake Durandal, only for Regin to swing a torch in her direction. She falls through a passage, with the fragment stabbing her in the neck and before dying, she wonders how she wanted to return to happier days.^{[LN 12]}
Auguste (オーギュスト, Ogyusuto)
Voiced by: Toshitsugu Takashina (Japanese); Brandon Potter (English)
Auguste is a member of the Calvado Knight Squadron and an ally of the Silver Meteor Storm. A native of Alsace, Auguste is Urs Vorn's longtime follower until his death. He joins several other Knights to aid Tigre in his battle against Muozinel in Ormea. He also helps in the final battles against Thenardier. Several months later he is assigned by Badouin to protect Regin under the guise of normality, choosing to arm his subordinates with crossbows in hopes of increasing the opinion about archers. ^{[LN 11]} Eventually, during the uprising from Melisande's supporters, he has Regin and Titta escape at the cost of his own life.^{[LN 12]}
Gaspard Rodant (ガスパール=ローダント, Gasuparu Rodanto)
Gaspard is one of Mashas' sons and Tigre's ally. He and Vorn have a friendly and even brotherly relationship. He is also one of Moonlight Knights's primary supporters. He does not participate in the civil war since his father asks him and his elder brother Urbain to protect Aude in his stead.^{[LN 11]}

=== Muozinel Army ===
Kasim (カシム, Kashimu)
Voiced by: Yoshihisa Kawahara (Japanese); Dave Trosko (English)
Kasim is a general of the vanguard of the invading Muozinel Army. He was once a slave but because his talent was recognized, he was freed. In order to provoke the Silver Meteor Storm, Kasim ordered the beheading of 10 male slaves and threatened to do the same to the women unless they surrendered. His arrogance is what caused his death, as he failed to realize he had fallen into an enemy's trap. He was shot and killed instantly by Tigre with a well-aimed arrow to the face.^{[S1 ep 8]}
Kureys Shahin Balamir (クレイシュ=シャヒーン=バラミール, Kureishu Shahīn Baramīru)
Voiced by: Masami Iwasaki (Japanese); Kyle Hebert (English)
Kureys is the younger brother of the King of Muozinel and General of the full army. He received the nickname "Red Beard" after he defeated an invading army five times the size of his. An excellent tactician, capable of discerning the best possible strategy with his available troops. After he realized that even if he defeated Tigre and his current forces, the remaining soldiers would have been crushed by the forces of Thenardier. He decides to retreat with his remaining forces, not long after he sends a letter of congratulations to Tigre calling him "Star Shooter".
He returns several months later with an army of 100,000 men, and remains at the border between Muozinel, Brune and Zhcted for about a month without fighting. After assigning his aide Damad with the task of finding out Tigre's whereabouts, he returns to Muozinel without even trying to invade, vowing to return next year with an army of 150,000 men.
While keeping Zchted occupied with small attacks towards Olmutz and Polesia, once he found out about the repelling of Sachstein, he mobilized his troops to invade southern Brune. After he subjugated Nemetacum, he confirms Tigre's whereabouts among the Moonlight Knights which prompts him to go on to capture Nice, but later he withdraws completely after the battle of Severack when he heard of his brother's (King of Muozinel) death. He further remarks that as long as Tigre was still alive, Brune will never fall despite the fact that he was able to capture Nice.
Damad (ダーマード, Dāmādo)
Damad is a 19-year-old man and an aide of Kureys, he is tasked by the General with inquiring the whereabouts of Tigre after he goes missing, and kill him if necessary. He unexpectedly saves Tigre from some bandits after he becomes separated from Liza after the confrontation with Baba Yaga, showing his skill with the bow and sword. When they begin to chatter, he realizes that Urs is indeed Tigre, the man he was supposed to kill. He then draws his sword with the intent of killing Tigre.^{[LN 9]} After Tigre avoids his attack and they both realize their predicament, they agree to work together. Once Tigre is reunited with Mashas, Lim and Titta, he goes his separate ways, knowing the next time they meet, will probably be as enemies.^{[LN 10]}

=== Asvarre Kingdom ===
Prince Germaine (ジャーメイン, Jāmein)
Germaine is the eldest son of the previous king of Asvarre. After his father died around the same time as King Faron, Germaine ordered the execution of his six younger siblings under the pretext of treason, but his younger brother Prince Elliot and younger sister Princess Guinevere, escaped that fate. Although Elliot openly rebels against his brother, Guinevere prefers to remain neutral. He is a malicious, ruthless and paranoid tyrant that rules his people with fear. He takes an immediate disliking towards Tigre because he reminded him to much of his own father, the late King Zacharias, who was considered by his son as a "tolerant" person, and that made many nobles take advantage of him, but he cruelly punished some of those nobles to make an example. His loathing towards Tigrevurmud Vorn goes so far that he planned to have him, Olga and Matvey captured and sold to the Muozinel Kingdom to ensure an alliance to defeat Elliot, despite knowing that action will make him an enemy of both Brune and Zhcted. He is killed by his own subordinate, Tallard Graham, to finally stop his way of ruling and because they would lose to Elliot that way.
Prince Elliot (エリオット, Eriotto)
Elliot is the younger brother of Prince Germaine. After escaping the murder attempt of his brother, Elliot rebels against Germaine, hiring pirates to reinforce his army. He takes Sofy as hostage to get an alliance with the Muozinel Kingdom. Unlike his brother, who seemed to have a sense of duty, Elliot is a man that only follows his desires, many call him bold, killing anyone that dared to disobey his orders, Sofy knows the pirates will kill him the moment he shows weakness. He always despised Tallard for his commoner origins, and the fact that he defeated him in every battle they fought only increased his hatred towards Tallard. After being defeated, he is captured and sentenced to death for his crimes.
Tallard Graham (タラード=グラム, Tarādo Guramu)
Tallard is a charismatic 25-year-old man and a General working for Germaine. Just like Tigre, he is well versed in the bow and a very skilled tactician. According to many people, it is thanks to him that Germaine has remained in power. He betrays and kills Germaine to stop his way of ruling and because he knew he would lose to Elliot that way. The biggest difference between him and Tigre is his ambition, he will stop at nothing to fulfill his own ambitions, killing his Lord is an example of how far he would go to achieve it. He was born a commoner from a fishing village, but his rise in the ranks made him wish to become king, explaining his betrayal. It turns out he decided to work for Princess Guinevere and make her queen. It is revealed that he has used the Germaine's death as bait to lure Elliot to the mainland, forsaking the villages in his way, knowing his pirate forces were weaker on land, so his army could crush them. He planned on making Tigre his subordinate, but decided to let the matter go once Tigre left Asvarre. Sofy suspects he might become a terrifying enemy of Zhcted one day.
Half a year later, now with the rank of Duke, he would lead an army of 10,000 to aid the Sachstein Army, only for Tigre to convince him to defect, in exchange for allowing Asvarre to cross Brune in order to fight Sachstein on land as well. Tallard knows more about Tigre's reputation via Lim's account and he decide to avoid fighting Tigre for the time being.
Kressdill (クレスディル, Kuresudiru)
Kressdill is another general working for Germaine, according to Tigre, he looks like a fox. He helps Tallard betray Germaine.
Vaild Ludra (バイルド=ルドラー, Bairudo Rudorā)
Valid is a man in his early thirties. He is chosen by Tallard to be an aide to Tigre in the battle against Elliot. Despite his disposition of following Tigre, the Earl Vorn decides to give him command of the troops to ensure the morale and loyalty of the soldiers. He is impressed by Tigre's abilities as a commander and thought that he had fulfilled Tallard's expectations.
Simon (サイモン, Saimon)
Simon is the leader of a group of mercenaries from Sachstein that were recruited by Tallard. He takes a liking to Tigre and helps him take Fort Lux. He even decides to remain at Tigre's side while facing Elliot's army of 20 thousand, while hoping to get an even greater reward from Ludra.
Hamish (ハミッシュ, Hamisshu)
Hamish is a viscount at Elliot's service, he is one of the very few allies Elliot truly trusts. He leads a force of 400 men that specializes in the use of the Longbow. After he realizes Elliot's army is going to be defeated, he stays behind to try to make sure his Lord escapes, despite knowing that Elliot doesn't seem to care about him. He is killed by Tigre during the climax of the battle between the armies of Elliot and Tallard.
Princess Guinivere (ギネヴィア, Ginevia)
Guinivere is the younger sister of Germaine and Elliot, A beautiful 20-year-old woman, she declares neutrality in the civil war between her brothers, until she is courted by Tallard and decides to become Queen, with Tallard as de facto King.

=== Sachstein Kingdom ===
Augusto Benedikt von Rothschild Sachstein (アウグスト=ベネディクト=フォン=ロートシルト=ザクスタン, Augesuto Benedeikto von Rodshirudo Zakusadan)
Augusto is the current king of Sachstein, known for his stern and expressionless demeanor. Apparently he smiled when he found out about the death of Duke Thenardier at the end of the civil war. After investigating the situation in Brune and about Regin and Tigre, he mobilized his army hoping to annex several territories of western Brune. The betrayal of Asvarre meant the failure of his invasion and the declaration of war between Sachstein and Asvarre.
Hans von Klugel (ハンス=フォン=クリューゲル, Hansu fon Kuryūgeru)
Klugel is one of three top-ranked generals for Sachstein Army. He was ordered by August, the king of Sachstein, to lead an expedition force of 20,000 to invade Brune from the southwest. Born a commoner, he is well liked by his subordinates and he always carries two dice, and depending on the result, he would either move forward with a plan or abort it, and his intuition never failed him, until he clashes with the war maiden. He is manipulated by Tina into believing that Zhcted and Tigre would turn on Brune and he personally leads his troops outside of his fort, where they were ambushed and forced to retreat. He is then killed by Tigre during the final clash of their armies, but before dying he tells two of his subordinates to spread a rumor that Tigre is a traitor throughout Nice.
Leonhardt von Schmidt (レオンハルト=フォン=シュミット, Reoharudo fuon Syumito)
Leonhardt is the second of the top ranked generals of the Sachstein Army. Nicknamed Leonhardt the Blitz, he commands an invading force of 50,000 (all cavalry) and managed to defeat the Brune Army on several battles thanks to his tactics. Hotheaded and proud of his cavalry, while personally disliking Klugel, he vowed to defeat Tigre in revenge. Before the second clash between his army and the Moonlight Knights, the betrayal of their "allies", the Asvarre Army led by Graham made him retreat. King Augusto then ordered him not to return to the palace until Tallard had been slain while also promoting him to become Sachstein Supreme Commander to lead on Asvarre-Sachstein Campaign.

=== Other characters ===
Drekavac (ドレカヴァク, Dorekavaku)
Voiced by: Akihiro Nemoto (Japanese); Chuck Huber (English)
Drekavac is the fortuneteller under the Thenardier Family who keeps dragons as the family's prime weapons, an old and cunning man, only he dares to speak to Thenardier disrespectfully. He seems to know about Tigre's Black Bow. His whereabouts after the death of Thenardier are currently unknown. It is revealed that he is also a demon in human form, and an old friend, and occasionally comrade, of the witch Baba Yaga. Although their relationship seems mainly that of old acquaintances of equal status who occasionally meet, don't fight, and sometimes help each other out (for a price), but have no ties of loyalty, rank, much less concern outside their personal interests. For example, when their fellow demon Torbalan died, none of them felt vengeful, grief, or any strong emotion other than idle curiosity, before moving on to their own interests. He calmly watched how Baba Yaga was killed and eaten by Ganelon and tells him that despite his denial, he's no longer a human, and that there's no need for all of them to be alive in order to achieve their goal.
Vodyanoy (ヴォジャノーイ, Vojanōi)
Vodyanoy is a young man working for Drekevac. In reality he is a frog demon that was believed to only exist in fairytales. Was hired by Drekevac to steal Tigre and his bow. Although he was defeated by Tigre and Mira, he simply regenerated to report the situation to Drekevac. He seems willing to do anything for gold, which he immediately eats upon receiving, even if they're several bags worth. He's also strong enough to repel a Viralt barehanded and wasn't worried about facing Ludmila in combat. Like a frog he has the ability to jump long distances, shoot out a long tongue, but can also spit out a purple colored poison that can dissolve flying arrows in a split second. Vodyanoy can appear as a demonic shadow that ordinary people can't see, but those armed with Dragonic Tools (or a similar item) like Mila and Tigre can still see him. He felt no pity that his comrade Torbalan was killed. While he probably could be considered equal to Drekavac and Baba Yaga, he doesn't seem to have any personal interests or 'hobbies' like they do other than getting and eating gold. He reappeared to aid Baba Yaga in her fight against Liza, holding Elen and simply vanishes when Baba Yaga is defeated.
Torbalan (トルバラン, Torubaran)
Torbalan is another demon acquainted with Drekevac. He served Prince Elliot under the guise of a general called Leicester. Torbalan is a demon that kidnaps girls of his liking, has his way with them and then just devours them. His true form is that of a white giant monster with horns on the forehead that are capable of growing and retracting to be used as weapons. He's also capable of regenerating incredibly fast, rendering most injuries useless. He is defeated (but not killed) by the combined power of Tigre and Olga. He also has an interest in Tigre's Bow. Torbalan later reappears and attacks Tigre, Sofy and Olga when they were returning to Zhcted using a baby Sea Dragon. Although the Dragon is killed, he escapes and recruits a large army of pirates to invade Zhcted. He refers to Tigre and the war maidens by the weapon they wield, such as 'Bow' or 'Axe', as he has fought war maidens for centuries. He is finally killed by Sasha when the Fire war maiden used the full power of her Dragonic Tool to burn him, while preventing him from regenerating, until all that's left of him is a clod of soil.
Baba Yaga (バーバ.ヤガー)
Baba Yaga is a demon witch with the appearance of an old, short woman, the informed associate/comrade of Drekavac and Vodyanoy, and also the one who gives power to war maiden Elizaveta Fomina two years ago, when she stumbles into her temple. Although her relationship with Drekavac and Vodyanoy is friendly, aide seems to be in the form of a favor for a favor with no strong attachments. This is shown when Torbalan's death was discussed in a manner similar to talking about the weather, with no sorrow, grief, or any sign of seeking revenge.
She was referred as Jaeger-dono by Torbalan when he noticed Elizaveta's contract with her. She agrees to help Drekavac and Vodyanoy with inquiring the whereabouts of Tigre, and like the other demons she refers to him as "the Bow". She provoked nightmares to Liza in order to force her to seek more power, and thus fall more under her control. She gave power to over a dozen knights in order to have them singlemindedly kill Urz (Tigre), while unflinchingly ignoring Liza's orders, even after she struck most of them down. Using a Two-headed Dragon borrowed from Drekevac she attacked Liza and Tigre while at her cave, but unexpectedly Tigre temporarily summoned his Bow and killed the Dragon. This revelation made her switch from trying to kill him to abducting him, but was forced to escape when Liza used her Dragonic Skill at full power. While Tigre was still transported out, it was to another location separate from Baba Yaga.
After Liza destroys several of her temples, she finally confronts her, using her power over illusions, fire and lightning, overwhelming Liza, but as she prepares to kill her, Tigre and his soldiers arrive. Baba Yaga summons a hundred clod soldiers to confront her new enemies, while using her words to destroy the confidence of Liza and Tigre, but once Vorn manages to make Liza regain her will, Baba Yaga turns to her true form: a black-skinned, skeletal, bat-winged monster. She creates a Darkness snake that swallows Elen and Tigre, but once Tigre recovers his memories and recreates the Black Bow, she is shot and nearly killed, barely escaping, only to be later killed and absorbed by Ganelon.

== Reception ==
In reviewing the first three episodes of the anime adaptation, Jacob Hope Chapman of Anime News Network stated that Tigre has "some of that "perfect milquetoast" blood running through him, but the stakes are raised so highly against him that it somehow works". On the relationship between Elen and Tigre, Chapman said that the "sympathetic barbs the two trade back and forth is reminiscent of the endearing character dynamics in Spice and Wolf or MAOYU." On Ludmila's character development, Chapman said that Tigre's "roundabout journey to winning Ludmila's heart made for some nicely paced episodes with enriching character development." In his review of the eleventh episode, Chapman criticized Valentina's characterization as "a major step down from the degree of respect and character writing the story allowed the rest of its female cast" and said that the bath scene with Regin contains a "hilarious continuity error" when she reveals herself.

Can Tran of Digital Journal not only liked the diversity of the female characters and villains but also liked the relationship between Tigre and Elen. Tran also said that Tigre "proves to be a true underdog hero".

== See also ==
- Lord Marksman and Vanadis episodes

== Notes ==
Japanese translations
