= Szu-Yu Wu =

Taiwanese baseball player

Wu Szu-Yu
- Starting pitcher
- Born: May 24, 1982 (age 43)
- Bats: Left Throws: Left

debut
- May 4, 2004, for the La New Bears

Career statistics (through June 20, 2009)
- Record: 33–18
- ERA: 3.20
- Strikeouts: 333
- Stats at Baseball Reference

Teams
- La New Bears (2004−2006); Chiba Lotte Marines (2007−2008); La New Bears (2009)

Szu-Yu Wu (吳偲佑, born May 24, 1982) is a professional baseball player from Taiwan who currently plays for the La New Bears of Chinese Professional Baseball League. His nickname in Taiwan is 546, and he currently wears the number 46.

== Career ==
Wu played in Taiwan with the La New Bears until he moved to Japan after signing with the Chiba Lotte Marines in 2006. He is known for his exceptional control of the ball. Two years after joining the Marines, he had his official pro debut against the Orix Buffaloes on May 5, 2008, pitching 6-1/3 innings while allowing 1 run. Although Wu left the game with a 3–1 lead, the bullpen surrendered five runs and the Buffalos ultimately won 6–3. The Marines chose not to bring Wu back to the team after the 2009 season.
