= Hirobumi Watarai =

Japanese baseball player (born 1972)

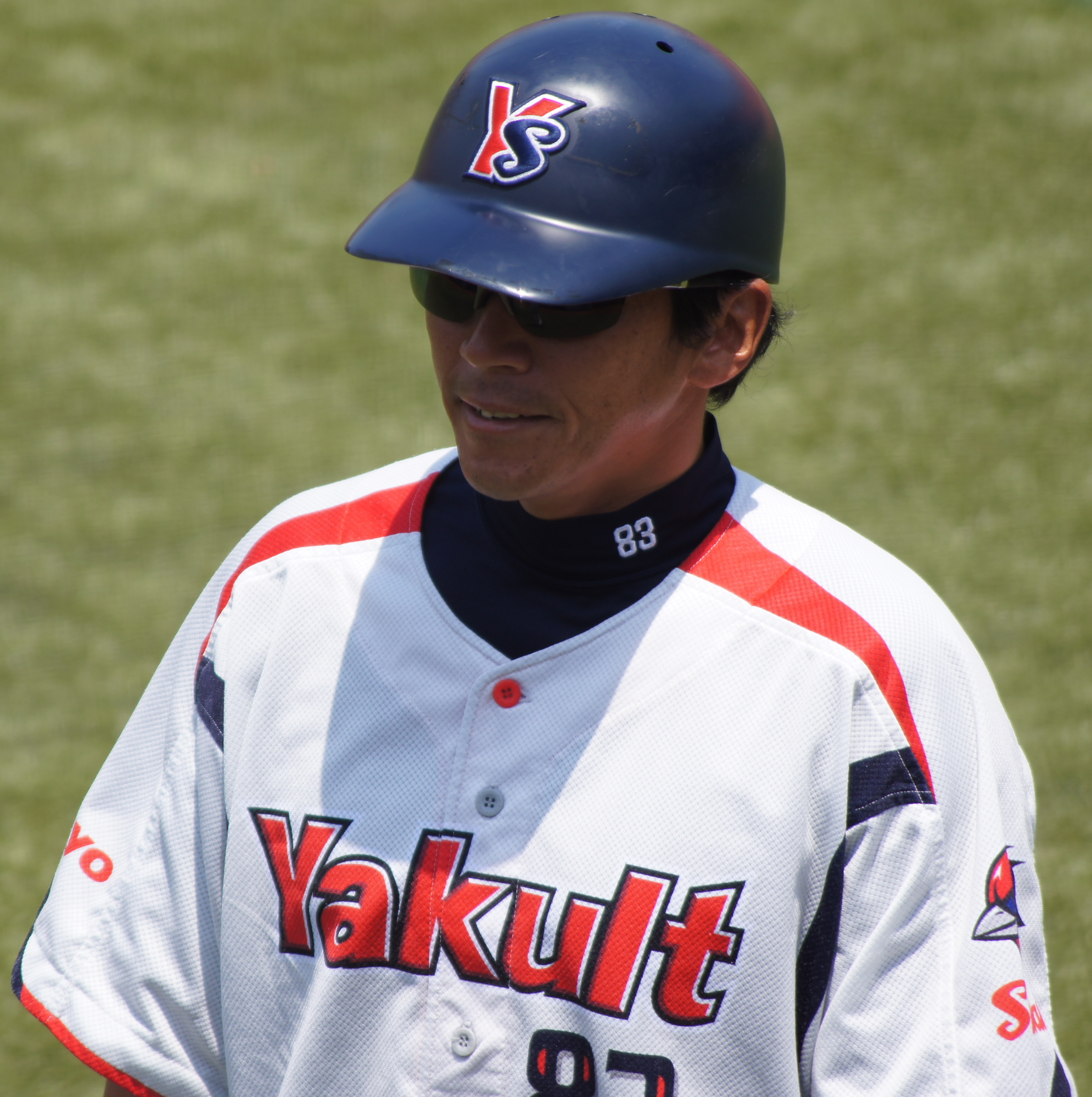
- Watarai with the Tokyo Yakult Swallows
- Infielder/Outfielder
- Born: January 26, 1972 (age 54); Funabashi, Chiba, Japan
- Batted: Right Threw: Right

NPB debut
- April 3, 1998, for the Yakult Swallows

Last NPB appearance
- October 12, 2008, for the Tokyo Yakult Swallows

NPB statistics
- Batting average: .245
- Hits: 173
- Home runs: 9
- RBI: 61
- Stolen bases: 2
- Stats at Baseball Reference

Teams
- As player: Yakult Swallows/Tokyo Yakult Swallows (1994–2008); As coach: Tokyo Yakult Swallows (2009–2012)

Hirobumi Watarai (度会 博文, Watarai Hirobumi; born January 26, 1972) is a Japanese former professional baseball infielder. He played in Nippon Professional Baseball (NPB) for the Tokyo Yakult Swallows from 1994 to 2008.

== Personal life ==
His son is Ryūki Watarai, a professional baseball player for the Yokohama DeNA BayStars.
