= Ryuji Wakatake =

Japanese baseball player (born 1987)

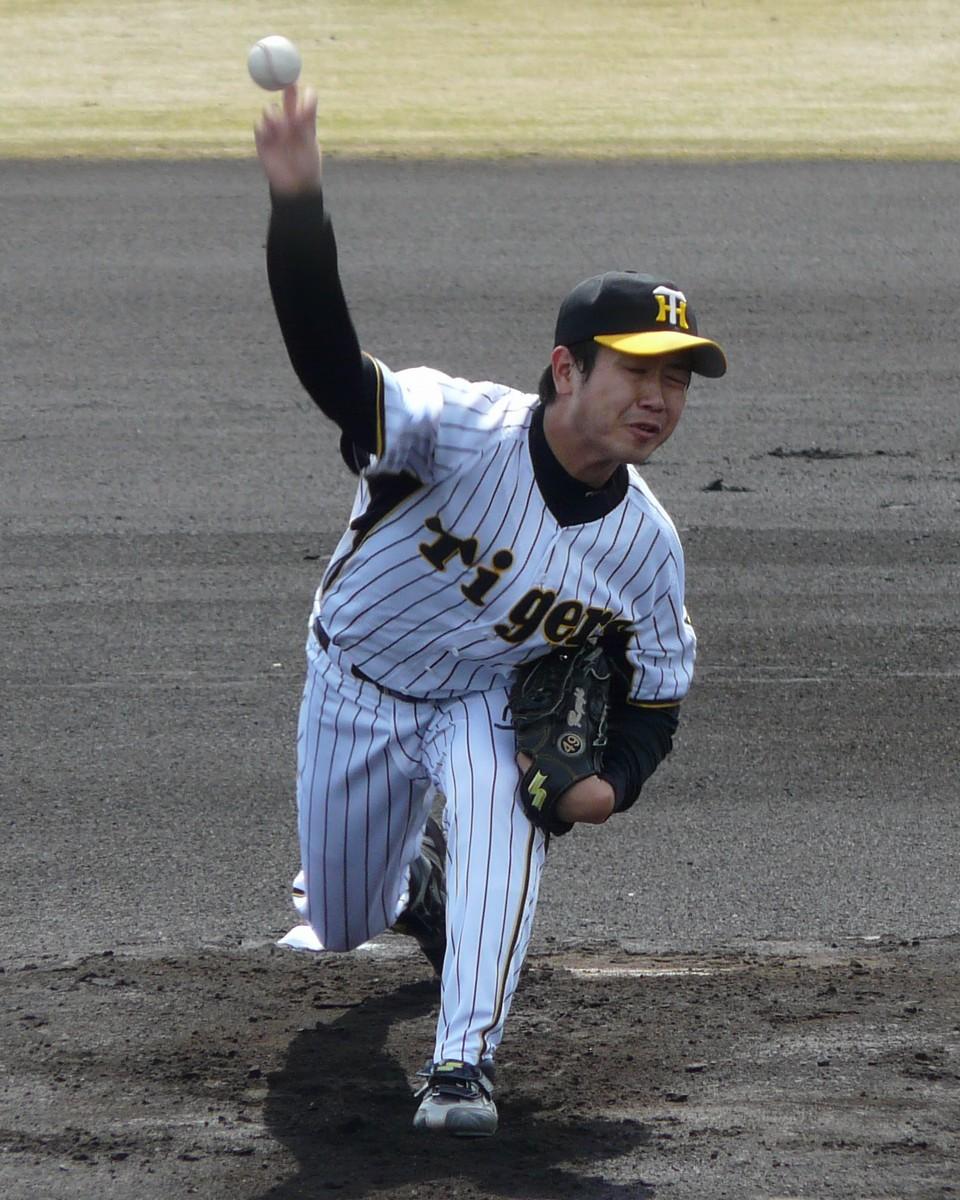
- Pitcher
- Born: October 10, 1987 (age 38); Toyonaka, Osaka
- Bats: Right Throws: Right

debut
- 2007, for the Hanshin Tigers

Career statistics (through 2012 season)
- WHIP: 2.571
- ERA: 3.86
- SO: 0

Teams
- Hanshin Tigers (2006–2012); Hokkaido Nippon-Ham Fighters (2012–2013)

Ryuji Wakatake (若竹 竜士, Wakatake Ryūji) is a Japanese professional baseball pitcher. He was born on October 10, 1987, in Toyonaka, Osaka. He is currently playing for the Hokkaido Nippon-Ham Fighters of the NPB. He formerly played for the Hanshin Tigers, from 2007 to 2011.
