= Lord Marksman and Vanadis =

Japanese light novel series

- Cover of the first light novel volume

魔弾の王と戦姫 (Madan no Ō to Vanadīsu)
- Genre: Adventure; Epic fantasy
- Light novel
- Written by: Tsukasa Kawaguchi
- Illustrated by: Yoshi☆o (vol. 1–8); Hinata Katagiri (vol.9–18)
- Published by: Media Factory
- Imprint: MF Bunko J
- Original run: April 25, 2011 – November 25, 2017
- Volumes: 18
- Manga
- Written by: Tsukasa Kawaguchi
- Illustrated by: Nobuhiko Yanai
- Published by: Media Factory
- English publisher: NA: Seven Seas Entertainment
- Magazine: Comic Flapper
- Original run: October 5, 2011 – August 5, 2016
- Volumes: 10
- Anime television series
- Directed by: Tatsuo Satō
- Produced by: Kazuo Ōnuki; Keigo Nakamichi; Mika Shimizu; Shō Tanaka; Tatsuya Ueki; Yasuhiro Kamima
- Written by: Tatsuo Satō
- Music by: Masaru Yokoyama; Nobuaki Nobusawa
- Studio: Satelight
- Licensed by: AUS: Madman Entertainment; NA: Funimation; UK: Anime Limited
- Original network: AT-X, MBS, Tokyo MX, TVA, BS11
- English network: US: Funimation
- Original run: October 4, 2014 – December 27, 2014
- Episodes: 13
- Light novel

Lord Marksman and Michelia
- Written by: Tsukasa Kawaguchi
- Illustrated by: Itsuka Miyazaki
- Published by: Shueisha
- Imprint: Dash X Bunko
- Original run: September 21, 2018 – September 20, 2022
- Volumes: 12
- icon

Lord Marksman and Vanadis (Japanese: 魔弾(まだん)の王(おう)と戦姫(ヴァナディース), Hepburn: Madan no Ō to Vanadīsu; lit. 'King of the Magic Bullet and Vanadis') is a Japanese light novel series written by Tsukasa Kawaguchi and illustrated by Yoshi☆o and Hinata Katagiri. In Lord Marksman and Vanadis, the fictional European country of Brune is under the leadership of King Faron. Brune is on the brink of civil war due to Faron's deteriorating health and a power struggle between the kingdom's two heirs. Zhcted, Brune's longtime rival, dispatches Leitmeritz war maiden Eleonora Viltaria to attack Brune. After capturing the Brunish nobleman Tigrevurmud Vorn, Elen must help restore peace and order to Brune.

The series consists of eighteen volumes released by Media Factory, under their MF Bunko J imprint, from April 2011 to November 2017. A manga adaptation by Nobuhiko Yanai began serialization ran in Monthly Comic Flapper from October 2011 to August 2016. A 13-episode anime television series adaptation by Satelight aired on AT-X and other networks between October and December 2014. The anime is licensed in North America by Funimation, in Australia and New Zealand by Madman Entertainment, and in the United Kingdom by Anime Limited.

== Plot ==
In a parallel version of Europe, King Faron of the kingdom of Brune (ブリューヌ, Buryūnu) suffers an illness leading to a dispute between the Brunish dukes Felix Aaron Thenardier and Maximilian Bennusa Ganelon for power domination. In response, Brune's rival kingdom Zhcted (ジスタート, Jisutāto) dispatches Leitmeritz war maiden (戦姫, Senki), Eleonora Viltaria, to battle them in the Dinant Plains. Tigrevurmud Vorn, the Brunish count of Alsace and the sole survivor of the battle, is afterwards captured by Elen. Later, the Brunish count Mashas Rodant has Tigre's attendant Bertrand inform him that Thenardier's son Zion is planning to subjugate Alsace. Tigre, with Elen's assistance, returns to Alsace, where he saves his maid, Titta. After killing Zion, Elen travels to Zhcted's capital city, Silesia, to inform the Zhcted king Viktor Arthur Volk Estes Tur Zhcted of her invasions and, with the assistance of Polesia war maiden, Sofya Obertas, has Viktor approve of Tigre as her general. Elen also encounters her longtime rival war maiden Ludmila Lourie, who is also a supporter of the Thenardiers. Elen reunites with Tigre and they travel to Mila's homeland of Olmütz to fight the war maiden. Realizing Tigre's intentions to save Alsace, Mila professes her neutrality in the war. With the aid of the Territoire Viscount Hugues Augre and his son Gerard, the combined armies of Brune and Zhcted are reorganized into the Silver Meteor Storm.

Back in Brune, Marquis Charon Anquetil Greast is dispatched by Ganelon to kill Tigre, but is easily defeated. Sofy informs Tigre that he has been charged with treason for allying with Zhcted. Roland, a Brunish Knight and Captain of the Order of Navarre, fights the Silver Meteor Storm but they are easily defeated. Traveling to Brune's capital city of Nice, Roland pleads Tigre's cause with Faron, but Ganelon kills him. The kingdom of Muozinel (ムオジネル, Muojineru), which periodically sends slaving expeditions into Zhcted and Brune as well as their neighboring kingdoms, plans to subjugate Brune's southern region of Agnes. Traveling to Agnes, Tigre and his allies liberate its citizens and rescues Regin, Brune's heir apparent and the former Prince Regnas who faked her death and exiled herself to Agnes after Zhcted's invasion. Mila and Mashas aid Tigre to defeat the Muozinellian forces. Elen learns from the Legnica war maiden, Alexandra Alshavin, that Elizaveta Fomina of Lebus plans to invade Legnica. Elen briefly duels with Liza and, after arranging a peace treaty between Lebus and Leitmeritz, regroups with Tigre and the others. To prove Regin's royal lineage, Tigre and his allies enter the Holy Grotto Saint-Groel and battle Thenardier and his men; Bertrand is killed in the process. After Thenardier's death, the public celebrates the end of the war and Tigre is pardoned for his actions. On his death bed, Faron further awards Tigre as the Knight of Lumiere, which only the Brunish prime minister Pierre Baudoin realizes is the traditional title given to the heir apparent. After Faron's death, Regin becomes Queen of Brune. Meanwhile, Ganelon and Greast go into exile and are sheltered by the Osterode war maiden Valentina Glinka Estes.

Six months later, Tigre and Sofy are dispatched to the kingdom of Asvarre (アスヴァール, Asuvāru) to stop a civil war between the princes Germaine and Eliot due to the king's death; Tigre befriends Sasha and Olga Tamm, the war maiden of Brest, in the process. Tigre and Sasha travel to Asvarre, encountering the Asvarrian general Tallard Graham in the process. As Eliot captures Sofy and detains her at Fort Lux, Tallard mutinies and kills Germaine. Hearing of the invasion, Eliot summons the demon Torbalan to fight Tigre's party, but they rescue Sofy and defeat his soldiers. Eliot is sentenced to death and Tallard becomes King of Asvarre. On their way back to Zhcted, Tigre, Sofy and Olga are attacked by Torbalan and separated. Later, Sasha and Liza kill Torbalan, but Sasha dies due to her frail health and exhaustion.

Finding an amnesiac Tigre, Liza takes him to Lebus. Back in Silesia, Valentina plots to assume the throne of Zhcted by tricking Viktor's heirs - Eugene Shevarin, the count of Pardu; and Ilda Krutis, the duke of Bydgauche - into fighting each other. Hearing of this, Liza, Tigre and their allies travel to Bydgauche to duel Ilda. After ending the dispute between Lebus and Bydgauche, Tigre becomes Lebus's adviser, having passed a series of tests in doing so. Liza and Tigre soon encounter the demon Baba Yaga, who is revealed to have given Liza some of her powers because of her jealously towards Elen. After demanding that Liza returns her powers, Baba Yaga briefly duels Tigre and Liza, but is overpowered and Tigre is separated from Liza. Tigre is soon found by the Muozinelian soldier Damad, who was summoned by Kureys to learn of his whereabouts, and the two befriend each other. Damad becomes suspicious of Tigre's true identity and they return to Lebus before Elen and her allies reunite with Tigre. Damad, having known Tigre's true identity, leaves for Muozinel, and Tigre and the others help Liza fight Baba Yaga again, Tigre's memories are eventually restored and he overpowers Baba Yaga, who is killed by Ganelon. After the Lebus forces repel an attack by an army from Polus, Liza and Elen reconcile and Tigre becomes their mediator.

In the following year, Sheravin is named Viktor's official heir when Thenardier's widowed wife, Melisande, orders the neighboring kingdom of Sachstein (ザクスタン, Zakusutain) to invade Brune. Tigre organizes the Zhcted and Brune armies into an alliance called the Moonlight Knights to repel the invasion. Tigre realizes that the citizens of Nice have been tricked into thinking that Tigre is being charged with treason once again. Later, the Moonlight Knights and Valentina battle against Ganelon and Melisande; in the chaos, Melisande is killed and Tigre clears his name. As a young girl named Figneria Alshavin is appointed the new war maiden of Legnica, Tigre convinces Asvarre to help repel the Sachstein invasion. The Moonlight Knights, traveling to Nice, are ambushed by Greast, who captures Elen. In Muozinel, Mila senses that Elen is in danger and travels to Brune to help Tigre rescue Elen from Greast's torture. Tigre and his allies reunite with the Moonlight Knights to defeat Greast, who is eventually killed. Tigre and Elen profess their love, and Tigre and his allies help stop the Muozinel invasion.

== Production ==
Lord Marksman and Vanadis entered development after author Tsukasa Kawaguchi accepted an offer by the MF Bunko J editorial department to write a fantasy novel for them. Kawaguchi contributed the concept of a young male archer and a female fighter who uses a sword as the protagonists, which the editorial department approved of. At the editorial department's suggestion, Kawaguchi included seven additional fighting girls and called them "war maidens". Kawaguchi wanted to have another weapon from a novel he had previously worked on for Tigre. The Monster Hunter video game franchise gave Kawaguchi the inspiration to develop Tigre's archery skills. Other influences for Tigre included historical archers such as Nasu no Yoichi and Robin Hood. Kawaguchi came up with the catch phrases "Strongest Bishōjo Fantasy" as well as the "Bishōjo Battle Fantasy" during the early part of development. When Kawaguchi was planning the second arc, he wanted to set the second arc in three years time. However, his editor requested that it should be set six months after the first arc.

According to Kawaguchi, he was influenced by Record of Lodoss War, Fortune Quest as well as foreign and domestic light novels. He also based the five main kingdoms on European countries, such as France for Brune, Russia for Zhcted, Persia for Muozinel, Germany for Sachstein and the United Kingdom for Asvarre.

== Media ==
=== Light novels ===
Lord Marksman and Vanadis began as a light novel series written by Tsukasa Kawaguchi. Illustrations were provided by Yoshi☆o for the first eight volumes, and by Hinata Katagiri since the ninth volume. The first light novel volume was released by Media Factory under their MF Bunko J imprint on April 25, 2011. In June 2017, Kawaguchi announced via his Twitter account that the light novel series would conclude with the 18th volume later that year. A spin-off alternate universe light novel series centered around Ludmila being the protagonist was published in 12 volumes under Shueisha's Dash X Bunko imprint from September 21, 2018, to September 22, 2022.

=== Manga ===
A manga adaptation illustrated by Nobuhiko Yanai began serialization in the November 2011 issue of Monthly Comic Flapper which was released on October 5, 2011. The first tankōbon volume was released by Media Factory on April 23, 2012. As of September 23, 2016, ten volumes have been released. Additionally, a yonkoma anthology was published by Medi Factory on October 23, 2014. The manga is licensed in North America by Seven Seas Entertainment.

| No. | Original release date | Original ISBN | English release date | English ISBN |
|---|---|---|---|---|
| 1 | April 23, 2012 | 978-4-04-066569-6 | September 13, 2016 | 978-1-626924-03-1 |
| 2 | January 23, 2013 | 978-4-04-066865-9 | December 20, 2016 | 978-1-626924-04-8 |
| 3 | March 23, 2013 | 978-4-04-066570-2 | March 21, 2017 | 978-1-626924-37-6 |
| 4 | October 23, 2013 | 978-4-04-066866-6 | July 18, 2017 | 978-1-626925-01-4 |
| 5 | April 23, 2014 | 978-4-04-066545-0 | October 10, 2017 | 978-1-626925-63-2 |
| 6 | October 23, 2014 | 978-4-04-066880-2 | February 13, 2018 | 978-1-626926-47-9 |
| 7 | March 23, 2015 | 978-4-04-067295-3 | May 1, 2018 | 978-1-626927-75-9 |
| 8 | September 19, 2015 | 978-4-04-067810-8 | August 7, 2018 | 978-1-626928-96-1 |
| 9 | March 23, 2016 | 978-4-04-068225-9 | December 4, 2018 | 978-1-626929-57-9 |
| 10 | September 23, 2016 | 978-4-04-068536-6 | April 2, 2019 | 978-1-642750-79-9 |

=== Anime ===
At the MF Bunko Summer School Festival 2013 event, Media Factory announced that an anime adaptation of Lord Marksman and Vanadis was green-lit for production. The 2014 MF Bunko Summer School Festival announced the cast and staff; it is produced by Satelight and directed by Tatsuo Sato with Kaito Ishikawa starring as Tigrevurmud Vorn and Haruka Tomatsu voicing Eleonora Viltaria. The 13-episode series, which covers the first five volumes, was broadcast on AT-X from October 4 to December 27, 2014. Six DVD and Blu-ray Disc compilations are to be released by Media Factory from December 24, 2014, to May 27, 2015. In conjunction with the anime, a weekly mini series called Tigre and Vanadish (ティグルくんとヴァナディーちゅ, Tigre-kun to Vanadi-chu) and a short narration by Yuka Iguchi as Limalisha called the Lim's Report was streamed online. Tigre and Vanadish is 2D animated with chibi sized characters that play out short segments of the light novel that were cut from the anime. Lim's Report is a brief summary and analysis of the war tactics used by each forces in each episode.

In North America, the series has been licensed by Funimation for streaming on their video website before releasing the series on DVD and Blu-ray, and in Australia by Madman Entertainment. Crunchyroll licensed the series for streaming in Middle East, North Africa, and Europe excluding the Nordics, the United Kingdom, and Ireland. In the United Kingdom, the series was licensed by Anime Limited.

== Reception ==
According to Japanese light novel news website LN News, the series had 1.8 million copies sold as of February 2017. In May 2015, Oricon ranked Lord Marksman and Vanadis as the 28th top-selling light novel series for the first half of 2015. Richard Eisenbeis of Kotaku featured the opening theme "Ginsen no Kaze" on the website's "Ten Awesome Anime Openings and Endings" list. He cited that the song "is a perfect fit for a series about medieval warfare where noble knights battle against armies of the corrupt."

Can Tran, writing for Digital Journal, compared the storyline of the series to the Valkyria Chronicles video game franchise and also that the series "embodies the empowerment of women as most of the female characters are incredibly formidable warriors that brandish special mythical weapons." On the characters, Tran not only liked the diversity of the female characters and villains, but also liked the relationship between Tigre and Elen. Tran also said that Tigre "proves to be a true underdog hero."
