= Shadow Slasher =

Shadow Slasher may refer to:

- A Japan domestic-market model of Honda Shadow VT750DC motorcycle
- A character in the Marvel comics series Master of Kung Fu
- An episode of Garo: The Animation
