= List of Garo: The Animation episodes =

This is a list of episodes of all three entries of Garo: The Animation, a collective of anime spin-off from 2005's Garo tokusatsu drama. From episodes 1–12, the opening theme is "Honō no Kokuin -Divine Flame-" (炎の刻印 -DIVINE FLAME-) by JAM Project while the ending theme is "CHIASTOLITE" by Sayaka Sasaki. From episodes 13–25, the opening theme is "B.B." by JAM Project while the ending theme is "FOCUS" written by Showtaro Morikubo & performed by R.O.N. From Episodes 26–39, the opening theme is "Guren no Tsuki ~Kakusareshi Yami Monogatari~" (紅蓮ノ月～隠されし闇物語～; "Crimson Moon ~The Hidden Dark Chronicle~") by JAM Project while the ending theme is "Kamon" (花紋; "Flower Crest") by Sayaka Sasaki with Inaribayashi (Mayu Udono, Eriko Satō). From Episodes 40–49, the opening theme is "Gekka" (月華; "Moon Flower") by JAM Project while the ending theme is "Karen" (花蓮; "Lotus Flower") by Inaribayashi (Ayaka Ōhashi, Sayaka Sasaki, Mayu Udono, Eriko Satō). From Episodes 50–62, the opening theme "EMG" is performed by JAM Project, while the ending theme "Sophia" is performed by Masami Okui. From Episode 63–74, the opening theme is "Howling Sword" by Shuhei Kita, and the ending theme is "Promise" by Chihiro Yonekura. Funimation has licensed the series in North America.

== Episode list ==
=== Garo: The Carved Seal of Flames ===
No.	Title	Directed by	Written by	Original release date
1	"Hell Fire"; Transliteration: "Gōka -HELL FIRE-" (Japanese: 業火-HELL FIRE-)	Yuichiro Hayashi	Yasuko Kobayashi	October 3, 2014
When the European kingdom of Valiante is plagued by a witch hunt sanctioned by the king's advisor Mendoza, Germán Luis, the Silver Makai Knight, saves his newborn son León as his mother is burned at the stake. Seventeen years later, Germán Luis and his son return to Valiante to find themselves targeted by Mendoza's men..
2	"Divine Flame" (Note: Kokuin (刻印) translates to "carved seal".); Transliteration: "Kokuin -DIVINE FLAME-" (Japanese: 刻印-DIVINE FLAME-)	Masami Hata	Yasuko Kobayashi	October 10, 2014
Mendoza accuses the queen of poisoning the king and alleges that his heir Alfonso is not his son. On their return to Valiante, León and his father come across a priest and group of inquisitors torturing the Makai Alchemist Ema Guzmán. They free her, but the priest changes into a Horror. During the battle with the Horror, León sees the site where is mother was burned and transforms into the Golden Makai Knight, but loses control. Later, Mendoza imprisons the queen while Alfonso escapes from Valiante.
3	"Zaruba" (Note: Keiyaku (契約) translates to "contract".); Transliteration: "Keiyaku -ZARUBA-" (Japanese: 契約-ZARUBA-)	Kim Min-sun	Kiyoko Yoshimura	October 17, 2014
As León cannot properly control the flames of the Garo armor, Germán takes him to the Makai Alchemist Gael. Gael has been repairing the ring Zaruba which is part of his son's birthright as the Golden Knight. However, Gael's apprentice Marcello kills the ageing Alchemist and steals the ring. He transforms into a Horror, and León, as the Golden Knight slays him and makes a contract with Zaruba. Meanwhile, Alfonso is attacked by Mendoza's Horrors but is saved by a Makai Knight.
4	"Bloodville" (Note: Gishiki (儀式) translates to "ritual".); Transliteration: "Gishiki -BLOODVILLE-" (Japanese: 儀式-BLOODVILLE-)	Masami Hata	Hiroshi Seko	October 24, 2014
León and Germán are disguised as pilgrims travelling to Santa Bard. On the way they visit a village with rumors of people disappearing, but the village chief denies that there is a problem. They then find shelter with a widow and her strange son, Alois. Eventually they realize that the wooden figure that Alois carries contains the Horror, and that Alois has been using it to dispose villagers who participated the murder of his father. León eventually destroys the Horror, whereupon León and Germán continue their journey.
5	"Gaia" (Note: Kenjin (堅陣) translates to "defense".); Transliteration: "Kenjin -GAIA-" (Japanese: 堅陣-GAIA-)	Kenichirō Komaya	Kiyoko Yoshimura	October 31, 2014
Alfonso's saviour is revealed as Rafael Banderas, who explains the existence and function of the Makai Knights, including Alfonso's family's connection to the Knight of Light. Banderas takes Alfonso to the Valdona of Count Romero but they find the property infested with Horrors, including a giant slug-like Horror who eats Count Romero. Alfonso attacks it without effect, then Banderas transforms into Gaia the Knight of Defense and destroys it. Meanwhile León and Germán continue towards the city of Santa Bard.
6	"Black Knight" (Note: Kishi (騎士) simply translates to "knight".); Transliteration: "Kishi -BLACK KNIGHT-" (Japanese: 騎士-BLACK KNIGHT-)	Noriyuki Fukuda	Shigeru Murakoshi	November 7, 2014
León and Germán finally arrive at the city of Santa Bard, where León's mother died. Soldiers visit Jordi the blacksmith, and deliver the sword of his son Sergi. However, the sword is possessed and takes control of Jordi. While drinking with Germán, Jordi reveals that the Black Knights of Castle Santa Bard undergo a ruthless test to join the knighthood. Later, Jordi's adopted son Julio tells León and Germán that Sergi was killed in the knighthood test. That night they meet Jordi in the streets who has turned into a sword-wielding Horror driven by revenge for his lost son. Germán sadly has to destroy him.
7	"Sorrow Beast" (Note: Jinrō (人狼) translates to "werewolf".); Transliteration: "Jinrō -SORROW BEAST-" (Japanese: 人狼-SORROW BEAST-)	Shun Kudō	Sadayuki Murai	November 14, 2014
The inn-owners mistakenly think that León is Prince Alfonso and tell the Black Knights who then raid the inn. León flees and finds the knights are Horrors. Their leader reveals himself to be a Makai Knight in black armor who is too powerful to defeat, but fortunately Ema saves León. León later awakes from a dream in which he is a werewolf, in the home of a villager called Pepe. He goes with other children following a harlequin to the almshouse of a church where three children are selected. León realizes that the children are sold to slavers, and Pepe has become their agent and reluctantly he has to destroy him to save the children. Later León finds Germán, stripped of all his possessions, including his clothes.
8	"Full Monty" (Note: Zenra (全裸) translates to "nude".); Transliteration: "Zenra -FULL MONTY-" (Japanese: 全裸-FULL MONTY-)	Kim Min-sun	Shigeru Murakoshi	November 21, 2014
Separated from León, Germán saves Irene, a woman being chased by bandits, however when they are alone and Germán removes his clothes, he finds that he has been duped and she is in league with the bandits. As he escapes, he is mistaken for a criminal and is pursued by soldiers. To cover himself, he steals a bedsheet from Ximena, an attractive young inn-keeper. He is then saved by Ema who tells him that León was attacked by the Black Knight, Bernardo Dión. Germán recalls his early years when he and Bernardo were training as Makai Knights and Bernardo risked his life to save Germán. Later Germán again encounters the Irene, who reveals that one of the bandits has become a Horror, and Germán kills him. León then finds Germán, stripped of all his possessions, including his clothes as in the previous episode.
9	"New Hope" (Note: Shitei (師弟) translates to "teacher and student".); Transliteration: "Shitei -NEW HOPE-" (Japanese: 師弟-NEW HOPE-)	Masami Hata	Kiyoko Yoshimura	November 28, 2014
Rafael trains Alfonso to become a Makai Knight to defeat the Horrors plaguing his kingdom. After visiting Garm, he selects a powerful Horror, the Chimera of Orvien for Alfonso's final test. At the same time, León prepares to challenge the Chimera of Orvien to prove himself. They find the Horror, encased in its own moving mausoleum and attack simultaneously, but are beaten back. The ailing Rafael arrives and launches an attack in his Gaia Makai armor, sacrificing himself. Alfonso takes up Rafael's sword and armor and launches an attack against the weakened Horror, destroying it. Realizing their aims are the same, the two young men form an alliance to defeat Mendoza and free Valiante from Horrors.
10	"Fallen Blood" (Note: Hakai (破戒) translates to "breaking a religious commandment".); Transliteration: "Hakai -FALLEN BLOOD-" (Japanese: 破戒-FALLEN BLOOD-)	Kenji Mutō	Yasuko Kobayashi	December 5, 2014
Alfonso learns that his mother Esmeralda is the youngest sister of León's mother Anna, making the young men cousins. A series of flashbacks show how Mendoza was excommunicated after creating a Madō Tool to control Horrors. This caused him to develop a hatred of the Makai Knight bloodline and he used Zirkel's Circle to infest Valiante with Horrors. Back in the present, Germán, León and Alfonso commence their assault on Castle Santa Bard through an underground passage. After fighting their way through a nest of Horrors, they are confronted by Bernardo Dion.
11	"Shadow Slasher" (Note: Zetsuei (絶影) translates to "cutting a shadow".); Transliteration: "Zetsuei -SHADOW SLASHER-" (Japanese: 絶影-SHADOW SLASHER-)	Kim Min-sun	Shigeru Murakoshi	December 12, 2014
Before Germán agrees to fight Bernardo, he demands to know what happened after Bernardo risked his life to save Germán. Bernardo tells how as he lay dying from his wounds, Mendoza offered him a chance to live and rule over humans instead of being their unappreciated protector. Faced with the fact that Bernardo sold his soul to Mendoza, Germán attacks Bernardo. The titanic battle between the Silver and Black Makai Knights comes to an end with them both exhausted, reverting to their human forms. However, Germán emerges victorious and Bernardo asks Germán to pass on his sword. Meanwhile, León and Alfonso encounter Mendoza who begins to create a giant Horror to slay them.
12	"Blood Moon" (Note: Gyōgetsu (暁月) refers to the full moon when still visible at sunrise.); Transliteration: "Gyōgetsu -BLOOD MOON-" (Japanese: 暁月-BLOOD MOON-)	Masaharu Tomoda; Shūhei Arita; Shun Kudō	Yasuko Kobayashi	December 19, 2014
León faces Mendoza who uses his magic to show a vision of his mother's death, while Alfonso confronts the huge Horror. The vision causes León to lose control of the Garo armor and go on a flaming destructive rampage into the city. Alfonso attacks the Golden Knight León and manages to return León to his human form. Taking León's sword, he becomes Garo the Golden Knight himself and destroys Mendoza. León pleads for Alfonso to return the armor to him, but the armor has accepted León as the Golden Knight. In the aftermath, León is no longer a Makai Knight and Alfonso learns that his mother took her own life.
SP	"Daybreak" (Note: Kyōō (饗応) translates to "entertainment".); Transliteration: "Kyōō -DAYBREAK-" (Japanese: 饗応-DAYBREAK-)	Jūbei Ino; Satoshi Hirazuka	Nobuyuki Itō	December 26, 2014
The voice cast of Garo: The Animation talks about the show thus far while enjoying some nabemono.
13	"Burning Ashes" (Note: Hōkō (彷徨) translates to "wandering".); Transliteration: "Hōkō -BURNING ASHES-" (Japanese: 彷徨-BURNING ASHES-)	Kazuya Iwata	Kiyoko Yoshimura	January 9, 2015
Valiante begins to recover under the hand of Prince Alfonso while Germán recovers from his wounds. Meanwhile, León is found and rescued by a girl named Lara and he starts living with her family on their farm. Back in Valiante, Alfonso spends the nights hunting Horrors with the help of Germán. León slowly adapts to life on the farm, and eventually helps to restore their damaged irrigation system.
14	"Geste"; Transliteration: "Bukun -GESTE-" (Japanese: 武勲-GESTE-)	Masami Hata	Sadayuki Murai	January 16, 2015
Alfonso tires of the mundane activities of managing the Kingdom and takes a wagon ride out of the city. The wagon is stopped by the bandit Gaspard Montes and his men who are based in an old castle in Lavietsla, formerly owned by Count Albert Juste. Arriving there, Alfonso finds Germán and is told the story of how Count Juste's wife Isabelle became a witch to keep her youthful beauty. Mauro believes that the castle is cursed after the Count killed his wife and himself. However Alfonso and Germán discover from Isabelle's diaries that the Count and his rival Lord Roland were both Horrors. The two Horrors reappear, and Alfonso and Germán join forces to destroy them.
15	"Project G" (Note: Shokunin (職人) translates to "craftsman" or "master".); Transliteration: "Shokunin -PROJECT G-" (Japanese: 職人-PROJECT G-)	Shigeru Endō	Tōru Kubo	January 23, 2015
In Santa Bard, the local craftsmen create an armored suit inspired by the legend of the Knight of Light to protect the city under the guidance of Julio. However, they find that the task is not easy as they expected, but they eventually complete the armor. They are approached by a farmer whose husband, livestock and crops have been destroyed by a demon. The team of craftsmen discover that the demon is actually a powerful bear and the armor's pilot, just escapes with his life before the armor is destroyed. The battle is seen by Germán and Alfonso who praises the craftsmen for their effort.
16	"Cure" (Note: Ijutsu (医術) translates to "(the field of) medicine".); Transliteration: "Ijutsu -CURE-" (Japanese: 医術-CURE-)	Shun Kudō	Shigeru Murakoshi	January 30, 2015
An ambitious villager kills the ailing famous doctor Fabian and assumes his identity, but then becomes possessed by Fabian's medical book. He visits the capital and treats the sick free of charge, including Germán and he heals Germán's friend Ximena who has caught the plague. Although he says that he only eats one patient per day, Germán cannot let him continue and he destroys the false doctor.
17	"Snow Fall" (Note: Yukiyo (雪夜) translates to "snowy night".); Transliteration: "Yukiyo -SNOW FALL-" (Japanese: 雪夜-SNOW FALL-)	Ho Pyeon-gang; Eri Osada	Kiyoko Yoshimura	February 6, 2015
Near Lara's family's farm León come across a broken Watchdog Center, a barrier against Horrors. Meanwhile, Alfonso visits the local Lord where he meets León. After making amends with the prince, León decides to continue living with Lara and her family, much to her surprise and delight. Alfonso remains in the region hunting a Horror, and Zarube detects a burrowing Horror, a Grand Magus. One night, León encounters the Horror and he sends Lara and her family to the old Watchdog Center for protection. Later, Alfonso arrives and destroys the Horror. However, in the meantime, the Horror slaughtered Lara's family who had returned home to protect their seeds. León finds Lara mortally wounded and she dies in his arms.
18	"Scar Flame" (Note: Gen'en (幻炎) translates to "phantom flame".); Transliteration: "Gen'en -SCAR FLAME" (Japanese: 幻炎-SCAR FLAME-)	Sunghoo Park	Yasuko Kobayashi	February 13, 2015
León mourns Lara's death and is riddled with remorse at not being able to save her. In Santa Bard, Germán prepares to leave, saddening Ximena who has developed a strong affection for him. As León buries Lara, he is engulfed by the flames of his seal, driving him to seek power and revenge. He confronts Alfonso, seeking to reclaim his armor and become Garo once more, and after a fearsome sword-fight, Alfonso agrees. Meanwhile, Germán stays the night with Ximena, but as he leaves the next morning with his Madō Tool Jiruba which has awakened after many years of silence. In the forest, León and Alfonso save two children from a humanoid Horror, both transforming into Makai Knights to destroy it. Germán finds them and tells them that the Watchdog Center has assigned him to assist Mendoza who is still alive.
19	"Tempest" (Note: Kokuyoku (黒翼) translates to "black wing".); Transliteration: "Kokuyoku -TEMPEST-" (Japanese: 黒翼-TEMPEST-)	Kenji Mutō	Kiyoko Yoshimura	February 20, 2015
After hearing that Ema is in danger, León goes to find her while she recklessly pursues the Horror that once was her husband and fellow Makai Alchemist, Luciano Guzmán. León finds them in the midst of a battle in which Ema is badly wounded, but survives. Later she tells León how Luciano became a Horror after his frustration at not being able to protect people and became obsessed with searching for a way to turn Horrors back into humans. Her misfortune was compounded by her imprisonment by the Makai Knights of the Watchdog Center who dismissed her ability to defeat Luciano. León then helps Ema set a trap for Luciano and when Luciano returns she attacks him. After a fierce battle Luciano appears to defeat Ema and prepares to eat her, but she turns the tables and kills him. Later, as León treats Ema's wounds, her earlier disdain for him turns to affection.
20	"Double Dealer" (Note: Jijo (侍女) translates to "maid".); Transliteration: "Jijo -DOUBLE DEALER-" (Japanese: 侍女-DOUBLE DEALER-)	Kim Min-sun	Shigeru Murakoshi	February 27, 2015
Alfonso and Ema start investigating the palace looking for clues about Mendoza's whereabouts and Alfonso begins to suspect Octavia. Meanwhile Octavia cares for Menzoza who is living in the old temple complex below the palace. Alfonso encounters the maid Laura who is collecting water from spring late at night and becomes suspicious. Ema lays a trap for Mendoza's accomplice, but when Octavia is caught, she uses a device from Mendoza to create a Horror and successfully cast suspicion on the hapless Laura. Germán then arrives to stop León, Alfonso and Emma searching for Mendoza.
21	"Knights" (Note: Fushi (父子) translates to "father and son".); Transliteration: "Fushi -KNIGHTS-" (Japanese: 父子-KNIGHTS-)	Masami Hata	Kiyoko Yoshimura	March 6, 2015
León and his friends still pursue Mendoza, causing the father and son to settle their differences in a deadly fight. Meanwhile, Octavia is praised by Mendoza for sacrificing part of her body to protect him. Garm intervenes in the battle between León and Germán which threatens to destroy Valiante, but the cousins cannot accept the destruction of people for Garm's larger objective and León and Germán resume their battle. As they fight, León recalls the time when he was training under his authoritarian father and how he learned the importance of Makai Knights as the unknown protectors of humanity. Germán eventually defeats León, hurling him into a river far below, but León managed to grab his father's Madō Tool, Jiruba. Later, Germán follows Mendoza into a chamber far below the palace where the demon Anima was sealed away ages ago by a Watchdog Center, founded by Makai Knights and Alchemists. Mendoza plans to revive Anima which he hopes will consume Horrors and make him immortal.
22	"Dreadly Focus" (Note: Kekkai (結界) translates to "barrier".); Transliteration: "Kekkai -DREADLY FOCUS-" (Japanese: 結界-DREADLY FOCUS-)	Shinichi Matsumi	Shigeru Murakoshi	March 13, 2015
Jiruba reveals that Gérman's plan was to gain Mendoza's confidence and find the location of the demon Anima, and that now is the time to go to his aid. Meanwhile, Gérman tries to stop Mendoza, but is attacked by Horrors. He severs Mendoza's left arm, planning to use it to open a gateway for his son to gain entry, but he is then attacked by a multitude of Horrors. Meanwhile, León, Alfonso and Ema break through an outer seal to Mendoza's lair, but are caught in a spell and find themselves sent far into the future. Ema manages detect Mendoza's devices to break the spell, returning them to the present. Inside, the wounded Gérman fights a losing battle against the Horrors to hold the gateway open. León and Alfonso physically break through Mendoza's barriers, so Octavia asks Mendoza to turn her into a Horror to defeat them and thus enable him to fulfil his objective.
23	"Doom" (Note: Gesshoku (月食) translates to "lunar eclipse".); Transliteration: "Gesshoku -DOOM-" (Japanese: 月食-DOOM-)	Shun Kudō	Sadayuki Murai	March 20, 2015
With a farewell kiss to León, Ema stays with Alfonso to fight the Horror Octavia while sending León to deal with Mendoza. León finds Mendoza who uses not only the souls of sacrificed humans in the form of a giant red crucifix to awaken Anima, but also the soul of the dead Gérman. Ema and Alfonso's battle with Octavia bursts out over the city endangering the population,. Meanwhile, León fights his way through a hoard of Horrors to reach Mendoza and impales him on his sword, but it is too late as Mendoza managed to release the massive Horror Anima. At the same time the Makai gate opens and Anima consumes the Horrors that stream through it. Ema sends Alfonso to the Watchdog Center to confront Garm, but he is beaten back. Ema is attacked by Octavia who wounds her before Ema manages to destroy Mendoza's willing servant. With León, Alfonso and Ema defeated, the Horror Anima is released and all hope seems lost.
24	"Chiastolite" (Note: Kōbō (光芒) translates to "beam of light".); Transliteration: "Kōbō -CHIASTOLITE-" (Japanese: 光芒-CHIASTOLITE-)	Yuichiro Hayashi; Kenji Mutō	Yasuko Kobayashi	March 27, 2015
Mendoza absorbs Anima into his own body, becoming a godlike immortal being and León makes one desperate, final stand to stop him. Ema and Alfonso manage to send Gérman's Makai blade to León which, combined with his own sword, provides enough power to trap Mendoza and force him towards the Demon World. Mendoza taunts León as they travel into the Demon World, but León's mother Anna appears and engulfs Mandoza in her all-consuming flames, trapping him and allowing León to escape back through the gateway on his Madō Horse, Gouten. In the aftermath of the defeat of Mendoza, Alfonso assists with the reconstruction of Valiante, Ema parts with León and goes her own way, and León gives Jiruba to Ximena who is now pregnant with Gérman's child.
25	"Home" (Note: Itoguruma (糸車) translates to "spinning wheel".) (Note: This extra episode is included in the DVD/BD vol.8 of the series.); Transliteration: "Itoguruma -HOME-" (Japanese: 糸車-HOME-)	Masami Hata	Kiyoko Yoshimura	N/A
Ema visits her friend Tina at the orphanage set up by their foster mother Natoria to care for children whose parents were killed by Horrors. While singing, they spin yarn, but Tina also spins the special thread used by Alchemists like Ema on a Madō spinning wheel. Tina meets their teacher Tobias who doesn't trust strangers and Ema suspects that Tina is attracted to him. When Ema takes the Madō spinning wheel away to avoid it attracting Horrors, Tobias' knife exploits his hatred of strangers and prompts him to kill two rogues who are planning to kidnap an orphan. This act causes Tobias to become a Horror and he pursues Ema so she is forced to kill him using Natoria's magic thread.

=== Garo: Crimson Moon ===
No. overall	No. in season	Title	Directed by	Written by	Original release date
26	1	"Onmyou" (Note: Onmyō (陰陽) translates to "yin and yang".); Transliteration: "Onmyō" (Japanese: 陰陽)	Takashi Igari	Toshiki Inoue; Shō Aikawa	October 9, 2015
In the Heian period of Japan, Horrors appear in the evening at the reconstruction site of the Rajou Gate and consume the workers. Seimei, a Makai Alchemist appears, supported by the Golden Makai Knight who destroys them. Kintō reports the incident to Fujiwara no Michinaga, head of the Heian-kyō guard, who seems unconcerned as his Light Palace is protected by the book of magic. As Seimei visits a temple, the carver Junkei arrives to insert a bodhisattava carving of Buddha into a large Nio statue to quell its anger and stop it walking at night. Seimei correctly states that the statue is not imbued with life, which angers the sculptor. That night, Raikou and his attendant Kintoki investigate and find the statue gone. Meanwhile, the sculptor kills a woman to enhance the power of his carved figure, and then encounters the Nio statue who turns him into a Horror. Raikou finds the scene of Junkei's sacrifices and tells Seimei who decides to act as bait. She traps Junkei and Raikou destroys the Horror, only to find the Nio statue is inhabited by a man with a scarred face.
27	2	"Tied Sword"; Transliteration: "Entō" (Japanese: 縁刀)	Kenichirō Komaya	Shō Aikawa	October 16, 2015
Seimei reveals the man in the statue to be Ayashi Douman. At the behest of the Eastern Watchdogs, Raikou and Seimei take on an apprentice, Katsuragi no Hisayori, who claims he wants to become a Makai Knight to follow in his father's footsteps. They hear of a Horror which has been targeting owners of well-known swords. Seimei questions Izumi Shikibu about Hisayori who confirms his background, however that night, Hisayori tries to steal Raikou's sword, claiming that it belonged to his father. When confronted Hisayori is revealed as a Horror, and Raikou wonders if he killed Hisayori's father when he was a Lost Soul Beast. Seimei realizes that they have been used by the Eastern Watchdogs to deal with Hisayori. However when given the choice, the sword chooses Raikou who becomes the Golden Makai Knight and slays Hisayori. Later, Seimei reveals that Hisayori killed his own father, information she kept from Raikou to test his resolve.
28	3	"Curse"; Transliteration: "Juso" (Japanese: 呪詛)	Masami Hata	Shō Aikawa	October 23, 2015
The ageing Abe no Haruaki finds a curse meant for the Fujiwara no Michinaga, head of the Heian-kyō guard, who orders the arrest of all onmyōji including Seimei and Ayashi Douman. This leaves Raikou and Kintoki to prove her innocence. Douman is accused of aiding the vice-minister, Korechika, but in response he accuses Michinaga of orchestrating the curse to destroy Korechika whom he sees as a rival. Douman uses the seized items to create a portal within the compound for Horrors to emerge and devour the humans and turn others into more Horrors. Seimei reluctantly helps Raikou to become the Golden Makai Knight to destroy the Horrors, but Douman escapes. Later, Minamato Yorinobu complains to his ailing father that the Golden armor rightly belongs to their family.
29	4	"Kaguya"; Transliteration: "Kaguya" (Japanese: 赫夜)	Akira Hayashi; Hiroki Itai	Masaki Wachi	October 30, 2015
Raikou and Seimei investigate the beautiful princess Kaguya whose suitors are being killed by Horrors who then steal the precious treasures they bring as gifts. Raikou and Kintoki queue with many men waiting for a chance to see Kaguya, but during a commotion, Raikou rushes in and carries her off for her own safety. During their escape Raikou falls and lies unconscious for a while. When he awakes he promises to help Kaguya who says her parents told her that she was born from a bamboo stalk. Later, Seimei reveals that a Horror killed one of the two remaining suitors, stealing his gift, and Raikou and Kintoki go to question the survivor, Kuramochino Miko, in prison. However he escapes and returns home, killing his parents and takes the family treasure to Kaguya's home. Raikou, Seimei and Kintoki arrive to find him threatening to kill Kaguya and discover that her parents are Horrors, using their daughter to attract wealthy suitors. Raikou becomes the Golden Makai Knight and destroys them both and Kaguya returns to the place of her origin.
30	5	"Hakamadare"; Transliteration: "Hakamadare" (Japanese: 袴垂)	Kim Min-sun	Shigeru Murakoshi	November 6, 2015
Fujiwara no Yasusuke and his assistant Kosode cooperate to capture a criminal and he crosses paths with Raikou and they recognize each other. Later, Seimei pressures Kosode into giving her a hair ornament made for her by Yasusuke. Meanwhile Yasusuke become frustrated at the lack of action on crime by Michinaga. He has more affinity for the poor people who have to resort to crime than the lazy aristocracy who squander the wealth they extract from the population. He loves Kosode and is willing to forgo his birthright, but she rejects him for throwing away something she sees as so valuable. He tells Yasumasa that he wishes to renounce his birthright, but is wounded by Yorinobu. Meanwhile, Kosode is ridiculed and beaten after mistakenly accused of stealing cloth, and becomes a Horror, killing her tormentors and has to be killed by Raikou. Later, Yasusuke takes the name Hakamadare the thief.
31	6	"Lurking Demon"; Transliteration: "Fukuma" (Japanese: 伏魔)	Kim Dong-jun	Seishi Minakami	November 13, 2015
Douman breaks a seal on the Crying Snake Mound and releases the Horror Itsumaden which loves epidemics. Raikou, Seimei, and Kintoki meet the young boy Gobeh who is stealing things to buy medicine for his sick mother and sister. Raikou and Kintoki follow Gobeh to the bandits' hideout and they meet Yasusuke, now called Hakamadare. Seimei instead pays Gobeh to find strange objects for her, so he can buy medicine. However, a plague breaks out in the western slums of Ukyo, and Michinaga has the infected population confined to the Rajou Gate to isolate them. The Watchdog Center reveals to Raikou, Seimei, and Kintoki that Itsumaden is free, and probably hosted by someone desperate to live. Douman secretly wills Gobeh's mother to accept the darkness that is Itsumaden who appears at Rajou Gate, but she resists allowing herself to die and Raikou slays Itsumaden as the Golden Knight.
32	7	"Mother Daughter"; Transliteration: "Oyako" (Japanese: 母娘)	Kenji Mutō	Shō Aikawa	November 20, 2015
Masamune goes with Yorinobu and Yasumasa to visit Haruaki and discuss his former connection with Ashiya Douman whom Michinaga wants to hire. Suddenly an evil cat spirit strikes the Abe household and inhabits Masamune, but Haruaki manages to protect them. Seimei begrudgingly accepts a request from Michinaga to investigate the threat because it called out her real name, Kiyome. She finds Douman trying to awaken a sealed Horror in Kumano which she suspects contained her mother, Katsurakohime. Meanwhile at the Watchdog Center, Raikou learns about Seimei's past and that her father, a Makai Alchemist sacrificed himself with her mother to contain the Horrors in Kumano. Raikou approaches Haruaki who reveals that he sealed away Seimei's parents, which was witnessed by Seimei. Haruaki unseals Zaruba so that Raikou can become the Golden Makai Knight. When Raikou arrives at Kumano, Seimei releases the Horror, but seals it within a Madō chariot which she uses to help Raikou destroy Douman's armored Horror. She then cheekily re-seals Zaruba so that Raikou is again dependent on her to become the Golden Makai Knight.
33	8	"Brothers"; Transliteration: "Kyōdai" (Japanese: 兄弟)	Masami Hata	Shō Aikawa; Shinichi Inozume	November 27, 2015
A Horror attacks Minamoto no Mitsunaka, who kills it and takes its severed arm back home. Minamoto no Yorinobu begins to worry about his father Tada no Shinbochi's reaction to the news, so he seeks Seimei's assistance, but she tricks Raikou into going instead. When Raikou arrives Tsuna refuses him entry because of his past. The Watchdog Center sends Seimei and Kintoki to his aid, but they are trapped in an Alchemist spell set by Douman, however Seimei manages to release Kintoki. Mitsunaka tells how Yorimitsu (Raikou) and his mother were exiled to die so that the Golden Armor could be passed onto the son of a woman selected by Michinaga, Yorinobu who overhears. Kintoki arrives at the Minamoto house and accuses Mitsunaka of being a Horror himself, possessed by the very arm he severed earlier. As the half-brothers Raikou and Yorinobu reconcile, Seimei arrives with her Madō chariot and releases the Golden Armor and together they destroy the Mitsunaka Horror.
34	9	"Shine and Ruin"; Transliteration: "Kōmetsu" (Japanese: 光滅)	Kim Min-sun	Takao Yoshioka	December 4, 2015
In a flashback, a young Seimei fights a Horror that she summoned, but is saved and later trained as an Alchemist by the priest Douma who recognizes her as the abandoned granddaughter of Abe Hauraki. Raikou visits the Watchdog Center seeking work, and is dispatched by Inari and faces off with Seimei and Kintoki against a Horror which absorbs all light, even that of Garo's armor and Zarouba. The lack of light turns Raikou towards the darkness and Seimei seeks a solution from the priest Douma. He says that she can absorb the darkness into herself, but it will never disappear. Meanwhile, Raikou breaks his bonds and escapes. Seimei finds Raikou and absorbs the darkness herself so that he can return to the light, and the color in his armor returns.
35	10	"1/10th" Transliteration: "Issun" (Japanese: 一寸)	Mihiro Yamaguchi	Shinichi Inozume	December 11, 2015 (Note: This episode was broadcast 15 minutes later than normal.)
The monk Jihō wishes to rid the world of self-serving onmyōji and is tricked by Douman into becoming a Horror. Meanwhile, Seimei visits the onmyōji where Kamo no Yasunori accuses her of involvement with an attack by Horrors. Later Raikou arrives and finds the Horror by the nearby river, but it reduces him to a miniature size. After finding him at home, Seimei deduces that the missing onmyōji have also been miniaturized. Meanwhile, Yorinobu visits Jihō who states that Michinaga no longer thinks about the people and that he will cause the destruction of the capital, but then realizes that Jihō is a Horror. Yorinobu asks Seimei and the miniature Raikou and to save Jihō from the Horror he has become. She reluctantly agrees and they prepare a trap where she pretends to be Kamo no Yasunori as bait for Jihō. He attacks the carriage, and when the miniature Raikou attacks the Horror, it grabs and swallows him. Seimei then transforms him into the Golden Makai Knight and he cuts his way free, destroying the Horror and returning to his normal size.
36	11	"Zanga"; Transliteration: "Zanga" (Japanese: 斬牙)	Yasunori Ban; Hiroki Itai	Masaki Wachi	December 18, 2015
Fujiwara no Yasusuke, now called the bandit Hakamadare, meets Tenkaimaru, a bandit leader in the old Southern Capital. Meanwhile in the Light Palace, Fujiwara no Michinaga, still desires a Makai Knight for protection. He learns that the Southern Fujiwara family also has the Silver Makai armor, but its whereabouts are unknown. Elsewhere, when Hakamadare's bandits rob a wealthy family, they are attacked and killed by a Horror firing "kemari" balls. Hakamadare recalls the time during youth service selection when a fellow student Narimichi injured his ankle while trying to outdo him. He then discovers that the "kemari" Horror is Narimichi who challenges Yasusuke to a match. They are interrupted by Golden Makai Knight, but Yasusuke insists on fighting the Horror himself. A flashback shows that Tenkaimaru revealed to Yasusuke that he was Fujiwara no Tokitada who fell into disfavor with Michinaga and he gave Yasusuke a Makai Sword and Madō Bracelet to fulfil his destiny as a protector. Yasusuke then confronts Narimichi who blames Yasusuke for his unsuccessful life, but Yasusuke becomes Zanga, the Silver Makai Knight and destroys the Horror Narimichi, witnessed by his older brother, Raikou, Seimei and Kintoki.
—	SP	"Kyokuen" (Note: Kyokuen (曲宴) is Japanese for "making-poetry party at the stream in a garden".); Transliteration: "Kyokuen" (Japanese: 曲宴)	Jūbei Ino; Shōtarō Hirai	N/A	December 25, 2015
The cast members gather around a hotpot to talk about the first half of the new season.
37	12	"Conflict"; Transliteration: "Sōkoku" (Japanese: 相克)	Kim Dong-sik	Shigeru Murakoshi	January 8, 2016
As the new defensive gate nears completion Michinaga offers Yasusuke a position in the Heian-kyō guard, but he rudely refuses, preferring to act alone. Meanwhile, Raikou pressures Seimei to lift Zaruba's seal, but she refuses. Meanwhile, using Kamo no Yasunori's jealousy of Douman tempts Haruaki into becoming a Horror. On the eve of the commissioning of the Raise Gate, a cocoon of light signals the appearance of a huge Horror which attacks the gate at the bidding of Douman. Raikou vainly attacks it until Seimei appears and lifts the seal on Zaruba and orders the Golden Knight to attack Douman while she deals with the Horror. However, Douman is too strong and Seimei is forced to choose between saving Raikou or the people threatened by the Horror. She chooses Raikou and the gate collapses, killing many people.
38	13	"Seimei"; Transliteration: "Seimei" (Japanese: 星明)	Takashi Igari	Seishi Minakami	January 15, 2016
Raikou feels guilty for having caused so many deaths because Seimei chose to save him. Suddenly, Horrors emerge from the cocoon, and Seimei does not have the energy to lift the seal on the Golden Knight. Meanwhile, within the Light Palace, Douman's pawn, Yasunori, transforms into a butterfly shaped Horror and attacks the Heian-kyō guard. Seimei confronts Douman and the Yasunori Horror, but is saved by the appearance of Yasusuke as the Silver Knight, however they realize that Douman's real target is the Light Palace. With the help of his friends, Raikou realizes that Seimei has been supporting him all this time, and he manages to break the seal on Zaruba himself, summoning the Garo armor. He cuts through the stream of Horrors and rescues Seimei from Douman and the Yasunori Horror. Seimei realizes that Priest Douman's plan was to separate her from Raikou to seal away the Golden Knight and to embrace the darkness within herself. Surprisingly, Seimei walks away from Raikou, asserting that he is now able to look after himself.
39	14	"Soul Moon"; Transliteration: "Shingetsu" (Japanese: 心月)	Kaori Makita	Shigeru Murakoshi	January 22, 2016
Minamoto no Tōru, a Major Counsellor, complains when a messenger brings news that Princess Suetsumuhana has rejected his overtures again. He then has his consort murder the messenger before kissing her and absorbing her energy. Raikou and Kintoki are summoned by Inari for a mission meanwhile Suetsumuhana helps Yorinobu distribute food to those who lost their homes when the Raise Gate collapsed. Raikou and Kintoki arrive, but they are interrupted by the arrival of Tōru, known as the Shining One of Genji and a ladies man. Yorinobu is asked to investigate reports of the daughters of aristocrats going missing and Tōru is suspected. As Yorinobu, Raikou, Kintoki, Yasusuke and Suetsumuhana search for Tōru, he attacks them and captures and abducts Yorinobu, dismissing the tomboyish Suetsumuhana as being too ugly. He explains to Yorinobu that he embraced the darkness after realizing that his own beauty was beginning to fade. Suddenly, Raikou and his friends arrive at Tōru's quarters and attack him, but he changes into a powerful Horror that traps the Golden Knight. As the Golden Knight breaks free, the moon is stained red, but eventually he defeats Tōru, although not before Yorinobu is seriously wounded defending Suetsumuhana.
40	15	"Worst"; Transliteration: "Saitei" (Japanese: 最低)	Masami Hata	Seishi Minakami	January 29, 2016
Izumi Shikibu asks Raikou to investigate the lecherous Tachibana Masamune by acting as his house servants. They accompany him on his ventures which involve trying to seduce any attractive woman he sees until his wife throws him out of the house. After women that Masamune has visited are found dead, Izumi then confines him within her house and assigns Raikou and Kintoki to watch over him. Just when it appears Masamune has reformed, he discovers that his wife is a Horror and she is responsible for the murders. His wife leaves to attack Izumi, but she is intercepted by Raikou and destroyed, even though she altered her appearance to look like Seimei. After Masamune is cleared of the murders, he promises to repent, but his resolve is only fleeting and he is soon chasing women again.
41	16	"Sinister Evil"; Transliteration: "Kyōaku" (Japanese: 兇悪)	Kim Min-sun	Masaki Wachi	February 5, 2016
Fujiwara no Yasusuke continues his activities as the thief Hakamadare while acting as the Zanga the Silver Knight under the Crimson Moon. He attracts the attention of the Heian-kyō guard so Yasusuke's brother Yasumasa visits him, warning that if Yasusuke is a thief he must be brought to justice. However he stops the Heian-kyō guard following Shijō Kintō's instructions to forcibly extract information from local people. While seeking information about the Crimson Moon, Izumi reveals that Kintō has prevented various Fujiwara families from social advancement. Kintō is revealed as a Horror in league with Douman, but when he prepares to execute local people he is stopped by Yasumasa. Kintō orders the guard to kill Yasumasa, but Yasusuke intervenes and Yasumasa escapes. Later they find evidence against Kintō within the police magistrate's quarters and Yasumasa denounces Kintō to Michinaga. Now exposed, Kintō becomes a Horror, but he is attacked and destroyed by Yasusuke as the Silver Knight. Minamoto no Yorinobu is then made the new leader of the police magistrate while Yasusuke continues his life as the thief Hakamadare.
42	17	"Extinguished Star"; Transliteration: "Seimetsu" (Japanese: 星滅)	Hiroki Itai	Shinichi Inozume	February 12, 2016
Inari warns Raikou of the dangers posed by Horrors in the light of the Crimson Moon which was a barrier created by an Abe alchemist to seal away a catastrophe. Inari has sent all the other Knights and Alchemists on a quest to find the "key". Elsewhere, Seimei destroys a Horror controlled by Douman and demands to know the whereabouts of Priest Douma. However, the Horror is still alive and it counterattacks, but Raikou unexpectedly appears and saves her. She staggers off alone, then collapses and is found by her grandfather who takes her to the place where the family have watched over seal on the Crimson Moon. He explains that the seal has been broken and the Horror Rudra may be released. He tries to remove the curse on Seimei, but he is unsuccessful and is almost killed by Seimei, but he is saved only by the intervention of Shiki. Seimei finds Priest Douma and Ayashi Douman who savagely attacks her. She tries to fight back but is defeated. Douman continues his quest for darkness, turning against Douma and releasing Rudra.
43	18	"Frenzy"; Transliteration: "Ryōran" (Japanese: 繚乱)	Yūsuke Onoda	Shigeru Murakoshi	February 19, 2016
Inari orders Raikou to stop Priest Douma's plans and destroy Rudra before the Horror is completely restored while Yorinobu seeks to restore public confidence in the police magistrate. Suddenly a cloaked female figure causes red lightning strikes across the city and when Yorinobu gives chase he is seriously wounded. Hakamadare finds Douman, but he is struck down, however his is found and taken to the Watchdog Center for treatment. Raikou then challenges Douman, but a transformed Seimei appears as Rudra's vessel and savagely attacks him, however she retreats at the appearance of Kaguya.
44	19	"Vessel"; Transliteration: "Yorishiro" (Japanese: 依代)	Takashi Igari; Mudang Jiansae	Seishi Minakami	February 26, 2016
Kaguya tells Raikou that she has the ability to seal Horrors within the red moon. Haruaki reveals that although Kaguya is a Madō Tool, and she can seal Rudra, her power is limited until the Horror is restored. Meanwhile Douman responds to a summons from Michinaga to join forces, but he refuses, preferring to rule alone in Darkness. Seimei, now controlled by Rudra, lures Raikou into a trap. She is no match for the Golden knight, but when he prepares to kill her, Kaguya intervenes and stops him. Rudra realizes that he does not have full control of Seimei who is resisting his power. Meanwhile, back at the Watchdog Center, Inari orders Hakamadare to destroy Seimei.
45	20	"Duel"; Transliteration: "Taiketsu" (Japanese: 対決)	Mihiro Yamaguchi	Masaki Wachi	March 11, 2016
Inari gives Hakamadare a glowing ball which has a Madō Fire sealed within it. Meanwhile, Raikou receives news that Seimei killed Yasumasa and he tries to stop Hakamadare from attacking Seimei.
46	21	"Resonance"; Transliteration: "Kyōmei" (Japanese: 共鳴)	Masami Hata	Shigeru Murakoshi	March 18, 2016
Hakamadare tries to kill Seimei, but Raikou stops him, so he withdraws, but asserts that Raikou must take responsibility for the consequences. Haruaki prepares a trap so that when Seimei chases Raikou, Kaguya binds Seimei so that Raikou can reach her heart. Raikou finds himself in a wilderness and reaches Seimei, but he is attacked by the female form of Rudra. Outside, Douman arrives to stop the process, but is attacked by Kintoki who distracts him long enough for Raikou and Seimei to exorcise Rudra from within Seimei. Inari then appears and deals with Douman. Later, Haruaki succumbs and collapses to the effort he expended in rescuing Seimei and sealing Rudra within himself. Seimei then has to ask Raikou to destroy her grandfather Haruaki, to finally defeat Rudra. Meanwhile, Douman is still alive.
47	22	"Rudra"; Transliteration: "Rudora" (Japanese: 嶐鑼)	Kim Min-sun	Shigeru Murakoshi	March 25, 2016
In a surprise attack, Douman takes Haruaki's body containing Rudra and begins to release the Horror, aiming to merge with it and gain its power. Rudra emerges from the red moon and absorbs Douman. It begins destroying the city, and as the people flee, the Light Palace erects an Alchemic barrier for protection, but excludes the population. Yorinobu please with Michinaga to allow them in, however he only has contempt for the common people. Raikou, Seimei and Kintoki prepare to stop Rudra, and after an initial attack, Seimei calls forth her Madō chariot to carry Raikou and Kintoki towards the Rudra, the twelve-faced monster. Back at the palace, Yorinobu defies Michinaga and allows the people entry. When Michinaga discovers that the book of magic is gone and no longer provides protection, he welcomes them inside, but orders Yorinobu to be killed. Yasusuke delivers the book to Kaguya which contains the spell to seal Rudra.
48	23	"Assault Moon"; Transliteration: "Tōgetsu" (Japanese: 討月)	Takashi Igari; Kenji Mutō	Shinichi Inozume; Tōru Kubo	April 1, 2016
With the book of magic, Kaguya prepares to cast the spell to seal Rudra while Seimei, Kintoki and the Gold and Silver knights physically attack the monster. Rudra begins absorbing the souls of people in the capital to increase its strength. They realize that Rudra is more powerful than before because of Douman's influence and Raikou is sucked into its internal darkness. However he manages to bring the light of the Golden Knight into the darkness and enable Kaguya to seal Rudra and remove the Crimson Moon. In the aftermath, Douman reappears and attacks Raikou again but is defeated, and Seimei releases his soul, freeing him of the darkness that controlled him.
49	24	"The Butterfly of Time" (Note: This extra episode is included in the DVD/BD Box 2 of the series.); Transliteration: "Kokuchō" (Japanese: 刻蝶)	Masami Hata	Shigeru Murakoshi	N/A
Tokiwaka, a double-axe wielding Makai Knight saves Minamoto no Mitsunaka from a Horror called Shuten Douji that no-one has been able to defeat, and he is ordered by Inari to destroy it. Later, he encounters a young woman, Tamagushi, who believes that her husband no longer loves her. Tokiwaka asks Izumi Shikibu about Shuten Douji and she tells him that it only seeks out pregnant women. One night, the Horror follows and attacks a young woman, and Tokiwaka manages to wound it without using his armour. Tokiwaka then confides in Tamagushi that his armor is cursed and prevents him from ageing. When he removes it, he sees a golden butterfly signifying the time he lost and becomes years younger. He also reveals that her husband, Minamoto no Mitsunaka, still loves her. When the Shuten Douji comes for Tamagushi because it detects that she is pregnant, Tokiwaka must invoke his Makai armor to defeat it. A year later, a young boy called Kintoki visits Tamagushi and she realizes that he is Tokiwaka. She asks him to protect her son Yourimitsu, who everyone calls Raikou.

=== Garo: Vanishing Line ===
No.	Title (Note: All English episode titles are taken from Crunchyroll.)	Directed by	Written by	Original air date
1	"Sword"	Sunghoo Park	Kiyoko Yoshimura	October 6, 2017
Sword destroys a Horror that has been killing people, causing considerable destruction in the process. Meanwhile, Sophie consults the fortune teller "Moon Wizard" to locate her missing brother, but he turns into a Horror. She only just escapes with her life and then Sword arrives on his motorcycle and destroys it. Sword then takes her to his favorite diner and Makai headquarters for a meal. It appears that they both seek "El Dorado". He promises to protect her although he also asks her to be bait for a Horror who has been hunting red-haired women. The strategy works and Sword destroys the Horror, however again causing considerable destruction.
2	"Luke"	Hiroki Itai	Shigeru Murakoshi	October 13, 2017
Following massive damage to a city bridge during Sword's battle with a Horror, Luke fires his special bullet into the sky, causing it to rain and wiping the memories of everyone in the vicinity. Luke meets Sword in the diner, berating him for his irresponsible methods. Later Hardy, a former world champion runner who is now crippled in a wheelchair, allows himself to be possessed so he is able to run again. Finding Hardy gone, his girlfriend Enith asks Sword for help to find him. Meanwhile Hardy is now a Horror and has developed a hunger for human flesh. Hardy returns home and attempts to kill Enith but Sword intercepts him, however Hardy is too fast and it takes the combined efforts of Sword and Luke to destroy him. Again, Luke uses his rain-making bullet to wipe the events from the memories of everyone in the vicinity including Enith who resumes her search for the missing Hardy.
3	"Gina"	Yasuhiro Geshi	Yutaka Yasunaga	October 20, 2017
Sword's old acquaintance, Makai Alchemist Gina, is in town to investigate an up and coming gangster named Damian Stewart because of his apparent access to the city's information network. Sword is disinterested until Gina mentions Damian may have information on "El Dorado". Meanwhile Gang bosses gather to plot against Damian, but he because he already knows about the meeting, he ambushes them. Damian then takes a surviving gang boss and feeds him to his massive computer system which is possessed by a Horror. Sword agrees to cooperate with Gina to discover Damian's secret. She infiltrates one of Damian's exclusive pool parties and obtains a sample of his DNA to breach the security system, giving Sword an opportunity to investigate. Sword finds the possessed computer which tries to kill him, but he manages to destroy it instead. Although Sword spares Damian's life, the surviving gangsters take their revenge on him.
4	"Brother"	Hiroki Itai	Tomoko Shinozuka	October 27, 2017
Sophie's roommate tells her that Father Ripley went missing and Sophie goes to find out more about his disappearance. He apparently lived with his sister Marie in a renovated church. At the residence she finds Marie living alone, looking frail and sickly. Suddenly Sword arrives and presents Marie with a bunch of flowers for the loss of her brother. Sophie and Marie share their stories, and become friendly, but that evening, when the talk turns to her brother Father Ripley, Marie has a flashback to when her brother treated her badly and imprisoned her in the basement. Marie suddenly changes and becomes violent and, fearing for her life, Sophie tries to escape. She finds herself locked in the basement which is filled with instruments of torture. Marie bursts into the basement and transforms into a Horror, but Sword arrives and a battle ensues. Although Sophie tries to help and is almost killed, but is saved by Sword's motorcycle. She again pleads with Sword to help her find her brother.
5	"Ring"	Ho Pyeon-gang; Matsuo Asami	Kiyoko Yoshimura	November 3, 2017
Surprisingly, Gina asks Sword to marry her. Her plan is to infiltrate the house of a successful woman called Viola, who apparently has a magical ring that is able to control Horrors. She made her fortune helping wealthy families deal with their difficult children, but some seem to have disappeared. Gina, Sword and Sophie go her mansion as the Brown family. While sword keeps Violet occupied, in bed, Gina and Sophie explore the mansion and find signs of Demons. Viola finds them both, and Gina realizes that the woman has been consumed by the Horror herself. A battle ensues, which is only ended when Sword arrives and kills the Horror Viola. Later, in the diner, Sophie again presses sword to help her find "El Dorado".
6	"Intricacy"	Shintarō Inogawa	Shigeru Murakoshi	November 10, 2017
Sophie continues to press Sword to help her find "El Dorado" and her brother, and tracks him to the Chinese restaurant where he lives and works. Meanwhile Luke and Sword receive instructions to investigate a movie theater where people seem to disappear. Luke goes alone, leaving Sword to "babysit" Sophie, however he finds nothing amiss. Sophie accesses online chat rooms and finds some references to a particular seat in the theater, L13. Luke watches a movie in that seat, and has a vision of being with his family in the past. At the end of the movie, Luke has disappeared. Sword visits the theater and Zaruba detects that the entire theater is the Horror. Sword plunges his sword into the seat, opening a pathway into Luke's vision where Luke is caught up in the memories of his past and Sword calls him back. Luke recovers his senses and blasts the Horror with his magic pistols and Sword joins the battle. After they destroy the Horror, Sword tells Luke that it was due to help from Sophie that Sword found him.
7	"Scout"	Kenji Takahashi	Kiyoko Yoshimura	November 17, 2017
Pawn, a scout for Eldorado, meets professional woman, Melia Wild, but before they can discuss business, Pawn turns into a Horror and devours her. Elsewhere the mysterious white-haired Knight appears in the city looking for Sophie. Pawn later appears at the Katrina Home, offering Sister a free holiday to El Dorado for the children. Meanwhile Sophie finds some references to El Dorado in the chat rooms, but the users have disappeared, including a seven-member team. She manages to trace them to a local shop. When Sword and Luke go to the shop, they find the missing people alive but unconscious and call Feilong for backup. Meanwhile Pawn appears at the school early, eager to take the children. Sister resists and valiantly fights back while Sophie helps the children escape and desperately calls Sword for help. Suddenly the Knight appears and kills Pawn, but then also kills Sister as well in front of a horrified Sophie. Knight tells Sophie that his master, the King of El Dorado, has summoned her, but at that moment, Sword and Luke arrive and confront Knight.
8	"Knight"	Sunghoo Park	Kiyoko Yoshimura	November 24, 2017
Sword protects Sophie while Luke confronts Knight and an all-out battle ensues between them. Luke recalls when he was a trainee and the Silver Knight his teacher, before he became the Dark Knight. The fight continues, but Dark Knight is too strong and impales Luke with his Naginata. Sword then attacks Dark Knight and they both turn into their Makai Knight forms and continue the battle. Meanwhile Feilong's people set up a magical barrier around the knights to protect the city and prepare to evacuate Sophie. As Meifong takes Sophie to a safe underground shelter, they are intercepted by a Horror, but Meifong manages to defeat it with a magic talisman. The battle between the knights takes on epic proportions with entire buildings being destroyed in the process. Eventually they confront each other without weapons, but as Sword gains the upper hand, Dark Knight departs, vowing to return.
9	"Setting Off"	Matsuo Asami	Tomoko Shinozuka	December 1, 2017
In the aftermath of the battle with the Dark Knight, Sister's funeral takes place and Luke is alive but badly injured, both physically and emotionally. Sword is given instructions in the diner to head west with Sophie in search of El Dorado and its king and to meet up with additional Makai Alchemists at San Del Rios. Sword and Sophie travel through the countryside beyond the city. They come across a wounded deer and Sophie insists on stopping and helping it and she realizes how much she misses Sister. Meanwhile in El Dorado, Dark Knight is criticized for his failure to capture Sophie while they await Sword's impending arrival.
10	"Rebirth"	Yui Umemoto	Shigeru Murakoshi	December 8, 2017
Emergency services deal with the casualties from the battle. Meifang patches up Luke and reminds him of his duty to destroy Horrors, their number increasing since some protective barriers have been destroyed. He experiences the effort made by humans to selflessly help others. Again Luke thinks back to his time as a child training with his parents to fight Horrors and how his father killed his mother in a quest for greater power. He recalls his dying mother's words that power is not an end in itself, but to be used to protect others and realizes that he must follow Sword to El Dorado to help him confront its king.
11	"Kidnap"	Michita Shiraishi	Shigeru Murakoshi	December 15, 2017
Sword and Sophie stop in a western town, Sun Dell Dios, while they wait for reinforcements. However the town is run by a vigilante group led by the sheriff Alfil. The townspeople try to take Sword into custody because they believe he kidnapped Sophie, while the waitress, Natalia, grabs Sophie and Alfil drives them out of town. When Natalia tries to sedate Sophie, she causes the car to crash. Back in town, Sword runs from the townspeople, unwilling to harm humans, and is eventually rescued by the arrival of Gina. Meanwhile Alfil reveals that he is a Horror and prepares to take Sophie captive, but she shoots him before he changes, and gains a reprieve until Sword arrives. While Sword fights the Horror Alfil, Bishop appears and prepares to take Sophie whom he calls princess, but again Gina comes to the rescue. Realizing the usefulness of the town has ended, Bishop reduces it to dust, however Gina had taken the precaution of placing a barrier around the townspeople so they were saved. As Sword, Gina and Sophie prepare to continue their journey, Zaruba compliments Sophie on her resourcefulness.
12	"Family"	Hirokazu Yamada	Yutaka Yasunaga	December 22, 2017
A stranger, looking for his friend, stays the night in a remote, run-down roadside motel, but a Horror violently kills him. Meanwhile Sword, Sophie and Gina drive through another ruined and rough western town. They arrive at the same motel where they decide to stay after days of sleeping rough. While there, Sophie meets a teenage boy, George, the lonely son of the owner Matthew and his wife. As Gina and Sophie take a bath, a liquid-based Horror attacks them, but Gina drives it off. Later, Matthew's wife discovers that her husband made a pact with the Horror to ensure the family's financial survival. Matthew wishes to return to Russell City and become a success, but instead, the Horror engulfs him and then attacks his wife. She is saved by Sword who, together with Gina, attacks and destroys the Horror. Before moving on, Gina rewrites wife and son's memories to eliminate their experience, believing instead that a tornado caused the destruction and Matthew's death.
13	"God's Will"	Hiroki Itai	Kiyoko Yoshimura	January 12, 2018
Gina suggests that they visit Ferre Salé Dessimo, a Makai Alchemist village in the Land of Guidance, to get more information about El Dorado. They arrive at a modest settlement built on islands of woven reeds on a lake in the mountains, where an elder tells them that El Dorado has become a problem. Gina, Sword and Sophie travel to the Land of Guidance and enter the temple that only appears on a full moon. Gina undergoes the trial, defeating wolves and a monster then receives a ruby colored gem. She is also told of the powerful ring possessed by the king of El Dorado, a place which lies beyond El Sanvados to the southwest. As they set off, Gina gives the gem to Sophie.
14	"Relic"	Park Jae-ik	Shigeru Murakoshi	January 19, 2018
Luke arrives in a town after being sent by the Land of Guidance and visits an old man and his granddaughter Stella with a Makai Alchemist symbol on their door. Stella, an avid researcher of the occult, tells him the legend of a Demon Sealer who sealed a demon nearby many years ago. Apparently the seal has weakened and the demon is about to awaken with the impending full moon. They take him to the place where a statue of the Demon Sealer once stood and with Luke's help, locate a sea cave where the demon was sealed. Luke identifies it as a Knight that became a Horror. The next night, Luke goes to the cave to prevent the Horror from reappearing and Stella follows him. The powerful Horror awakes and Luke tries to fight him with all the weapons at his disposal, including the spirits of those the demon defeated in the past and he manages to destroy it. As he leaves, Luke wipes their memories of the previous night's events.
15	"El Dorado"	Yui Umemoto; Takeshi Satō	Akira Kindaichi	January 26, 2018
Five bus-loads of young people, the chosen ones, head into El Dorado hoping to fulfill their dreams. Meanwhile a Horror, Bezel, has infiltrated El Dorado and walks the streets looking for King, consuming humans along the way, however his presence is detected by Bishop. One of the chosen ones, a young girl accepts a free invitation to an exclusive party, but she find that it's a trap to provide food for the resident Horrors. Bezel interrupts their feast and kills them all, although he is observed remotely by Bishop and Queen. Bezel approaches King's golden tower where he challenges Queen. He splits into multiple clones, however Queen is prepared and easily disposes of them and she defeats Bezel. He survives and just manages to escape with his life, only to be destroyed moments later by Knight.
16	"Chance Meeting"	Eri Osada	Tomoko Shinozuka	February 2, 2018
Sword, Gina and Sophie arrive at a seaside town, but Sophie is angry at Sword for eating her chocolate without permission. During the day, Sword saves a boy named Pedro from some thugs whom he blames for the death of his girlfriend Monica. Pedro ask for Sword's help but Sword refuses as he recalls the death of his own sister in an explosion the research facility of Cygnusram-Tech and the fruitlessness of revenge. Pedro again gets beaten up, and Sword again rescues him, chasing off the bully. As they prepare to leave the town, Sword gives Sophie a present of chocolate and her anger dissipates.
17	"The Slant Lined"	Hisatoshi Shimizu	Kiyoko Yoshimura	February 9, 2018
As Sword, Gina and Sophie approach El Sanvados, they are confronted by a battalion of Horror bikers. Sword attacks them, sending Gina and Sophie ahead by another route in the car. However Bishop sets up a Horror Barrier darkening the sky, and follows Gina and Sophie with a wave of flying Horrors. They are almost caught, but Luke arrives just in time, destroying the Horrors and breaking the barrier. Suddenly a new monster emerges from below the ground and captures Sophie just as Sword arrives on his motorcycle. Sword rescues Sophie and then Zaruba carries her away to safety on the motorcycle. Sophie is distressed at the trouble that she has caused her companions, but Zaruba tells her to keep moving forward. When they are caught by Knight, Zaruba crashes the motorcycle into Knight, sacrificing himself. Sword, Gina and Luke catch up with Sophie and Sword absorbs the remaining power of the Madō Ring in preparation for a showdown between the Makai Knights. However, after testing Sword's powers, Knight withdraws leaving Sophie and the others to mourn the loss of Zaruba.
18	"Illusion"	Yasufumi Soejima	Akira Kindaichi	February 16, 2018
Sword, Gina, Luke and Sophie finally arrive at El Dorado, a glittering island city separated from poor people wishing to gain entry. Luke creates a memory-removing rain shower over the border guards enabling him, Sword and Sophie to enter while Gina travels to the Land of Guidance to replenish her weaponry. Following his orders form the Watchdog Centre, Sword plans to find out the real identity of King. They explore the city where everything appears to be made by the GarEden Corporation. Sophie enters the amazing Eldo Net virtual world and finds the happiness there is very superficial, but then she receives a suspicious invitation to find out more. Suspecting a trap, Sword, Luke and Sophie meet the citizen who sent the message who reveals that the apparent utopia is run by Horrors who use it as a feeding ground. Suddenly, his hideout is attacked by assault Horrors, so the citizen transfers his data to Sophie's cell phone which enables her to access the secure network and track the approaching Horrors. They also discover her brother Martin Hennes is the programmer involved with El Dorado and receive a message apparently sent by Sword. Later, they help the citizen escape, but are left with even more unanswered questions.
19	"Farewell"	Hirokazu Yamada	Akira Kindaichi	February 23, 2018
Bishop sets in motion plans to capture Sophie, an apparent obsession of King. Sophie researches the GarEden Corporation online and finds it merged 10 years ago with Signa Slam, a company that Sword recalls was involved in a Horrors attack which resulted in his sister's death. Inside El Dorado, Sword, Luke and Sophie find that Makai plants are taking over, devouring the human population as they go but find a lone human survivor. They encounter Queen who uses the carnivorous plants to attack them while the survivor turns into the Makai Alchemist Stanley who abducts Sophie. She manages to escape into the complex, where she finds a door marked Martin Hennes. On touching the control panel, the door opens, and she finds what appears to be her brother's office, a diary and many fake letters to him apparently written by her. She is caught again by Stanley, but Sword and Luke find her and the battle continues. However, Sword is unable to stop Bishop who throws Sophie into a vat of liquid at the center of the birthplace of Eldorado and she loses consciousness. She appears to awake back at home where she sees Sword and his sister Lizzy, and meets her brother Martin.
20	"Utopia"	Park Jae-ik	Kiyoko Yoshimura	March 2, 2018
In her unconscious dream, Martin proudly shows Sophie the virtual city that is El Dorado where people address him as King although he says he is only the system administrator. Meanwhile, Sword tries to determine how he can be with his dead sister Lizzy. She offers him information about El Dorado while Luke carries his unconscious body to safety. Lizzy explains to Sword that the people in El Dorado are the souls of people who have died and been captured. She says that the ancient Horror King infiltrated Cygnusram-Tech and completed the theory of Eldo Net, however his plan was discovered by Makai Knights and although the facility was destroyed, he survived. Suddenly Lizzy and Sword are discovered, and the population change into robots and attack them. Lizzy then asks Sword to save Sophie and destroy El Dorado. Meanwhile, Sophie realizes that Martin is unaware that thousands of humans have been sacrificed to fuel the ancient Horror King's version of utopia, and the ring that Martin wears enables him to control them subconsciously. Sophie attacks Martin and he eventually sees the tortured bodies of the sacrificed humans. Tearfully, Sophie threatens to kill her brother.
21	"Cause and Effect"	Yui Umemoto	Kiyoko Yoshimura	March 9, 2018
In a flashback to when Sophie and Martin were orphans, Martin promises to protect Sophie and create a world free of difficulties. Back in the present, Queen berates Bishop for failing to kill Sword while he observes Sophie attempting to kill her brother because of the lives he needlessly sacrificed for her happiness. Frightened and confused Martin escapes into the complex. Meanwhile, Sword, Luke and Gina look for a way to shut down El Dorado, however Queen moves to intercept them using her Carnivorous Plants and turning citizens into Horrors. Leaving the others to fight Queen, Sword goes looking for Sophie. Martin recalls three years earlier when he was first approached by Queen from the GarEden Corporation who gave him a Madō Ring, and he begins to realize that he has been duped and used to create the fiction that is El Dorado. Outside, with Gina's help using a sniper rifle, Luke finally manages to shoot Queen. Inside, Martin finds Sophie, but the Madō Ring consumes him and turns him into a Horror, displaying his wretched face on its chest.
22	"Yu Light"	Yasuhiro Geshi; Park Jae-ik	Shigeru Murakoshi	March 16, 2018
Bishop remotely watches as the scene between King and Sophie unfolds and thinks back to when he recruited the naive Martin Hennes. Sword finds Sophie and they watch as King causes El Dorado to be bathed in a red light. Sword and Sophie are suddenly surrounded by hordes of demonic creatures, but they are rescued by Zaruba on a reconstructed motorcycle. Sword and Sophie then lead the surviving citizens out of El Dorado. With Sword, Luke and Gina reunited, they realize that King's plan was to use Sophie to take over her brother Martin via the Madō Ring Bishop gave him. A message from Lizzy is broadcast on all TV screens, warning that as King consumes the souls within El Dorado he will grow stronger. She also tells them that Sophie has administrator access to The Eldo Net storage unit that houses the souls. Zaruba convinces the despondent Sophie to join the others with the ruby colored gem given to her by Gina. Suddenly Knight and Queen attack the group, but Luke and Gina stay to fight the two 'blades' of King, while Sword rides back into El Dorado with Sophie.
23	"My Sister"	Yuichiro Hayashi	Akira Kindaichi	March 23, 2018
Sword bursts back into El Dorado with Sophie on his motorcycle and they meet Lizzy, but then become surrounded by King's robots. Sword remains to fight them while Lizzy take Sophie to attempt to deactivate the Eldo Net system. Meanwhile Luke and Gina engage in all-out individual battles with Knight and Queen. Sword is sucked into the digital void that is King and fights against a myriad of digital constructs, but eventually, by combining his Makai Knight form with Zaruba, cuts down King. Sophie struggles to destroy the Eldo Net storage unit, and when one of her tears falls on the ruby gem, she again sees Martin who gives her the password "everything is for my sister". She uses the password to delete the data and Eldo Net begins to disappear, but as Sword exits the King's void, he is intercepted by Knight in his Makai form.
24	"Future"	Sunghoo Park	Kiyoko Yoshimura	March 30, 2018
Confronted by Knight in his Makai form, Sword changes into Golden Knight, and they engage in a titanic battle using their motorcycles, swords and fists, until Sword finally destroys Knight. Meanwhile outside, Sophie wants to ensure that Sword is safe, but Luke fires a rain-making bullet that erases her memories. A year later, Sophie has settled in back at the orphanage, although she feels that something is missing from her life. However, after seeing blood when she cuts her finger, she recalls the ruby gem pendant and with that, her memories come flooding back. She rushes to the diner where she finds Gina who tells her that Sword is fine. Sophie then asks her how to become a Makai Alchemist, wanting to prevent the same events occurring again. Later Luke becomes a Makai Knight, Bishop enjoys freedom from the control of King, and Sophie finally meets Sword again, who emerges from the toilet in the diner.
